= Genoa-Saint George Bridge =

Motorway viaduct in Genoa, Italy

Genoa Saint George Bridge Viadotto Genova-San Giorgio
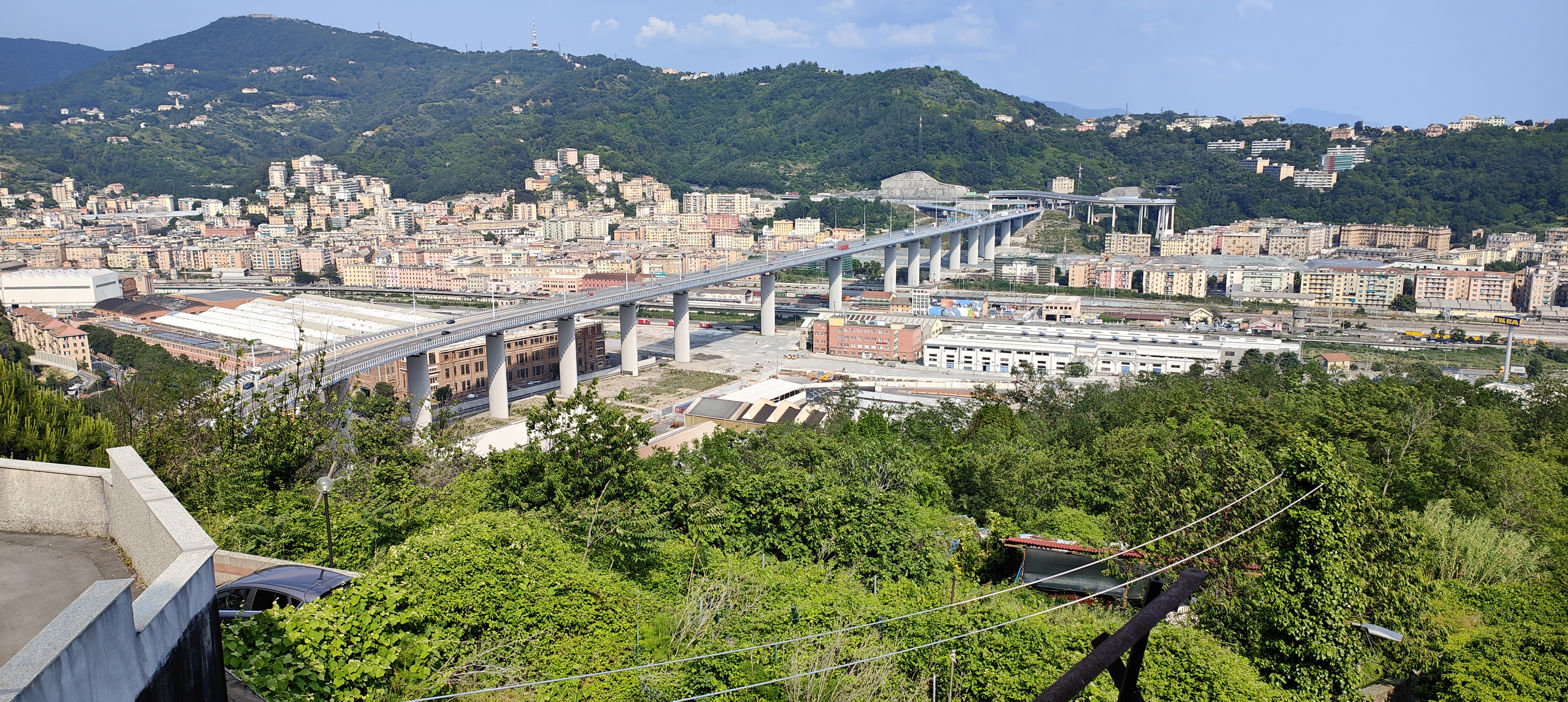
- Coordinates: 44°25′33″N 08°53′20″E
- Carries: 4 lanes of A 10 / E80
- Crosses: Polcevera; Turin–Genoa railway; Milan–Genoa railway
- Locale: Genoa, Italy
- Maintained by: Autostrade per l'Italia

Characteristics
- Design: Viaduct
- Total length: 1,067 metres (3,501 ft)
- Width: 30.80 metres (101.0 ft)
- No. of lanes: 4 (+2 emergency lanes)

History
- Architect: Renzo Piano
- Constructed by: Fincantieri; Webuild
- Construction cost: € 202 million
- Opened: 4 August 2020
- Inaugurated: 3 August 2020

Location
- Interactive map of Genoa Saint George Bridge

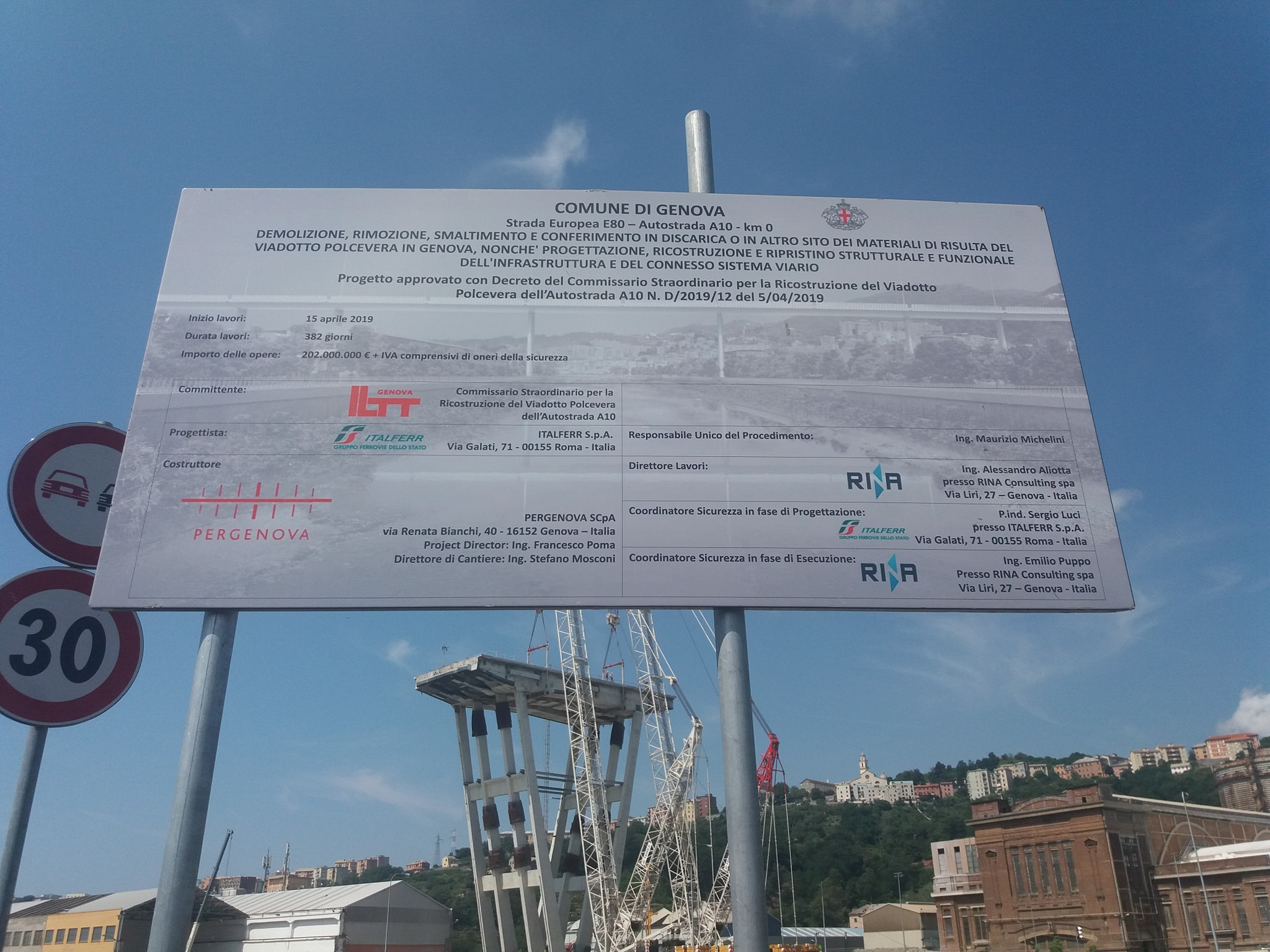
Sign of the works on the demolition of the Polcevera Viaduct and the construction of the bridge for Genoa.

The Genoa Saint George Bridge (Italian: Viadotto Genova-San Giorgio) is a motorway viaduct that crosses the Polcevera river and the districts of Sampierdarena and Cornigliano, in the city of Genoa. It was designed by architect Renzo Piano.

The bridge replaces the Ponte Morandi (Polcevera Viaduct), which partially collapsed on 14 August 2018 and was demolished in June 2019.

The new viaduct, with its associated junctions, constitutes the initial section of the Italian A10 motorway, managed by the concessionaire Autostrade per l'Italia, which in turn is included in the European route E80.

The new bridge was inaugurated on 3 August 2020.

== Features ==
The bridge design was developed by the Genoese architect Renzo Piano through his Building Workshop and was officially presented on 7 September 2018 together with the President of Liguria Giovanni Toti, the Mayor of Genoa Marco Bucci and the CEOs of Autostrade per l'Italia and Fincantieri, Giovanni Castellucci and Giuseppe Bono respectively. The project includes four lanes and two emergency lanes.

Built as a mixed steel-concrete structure, it is 1,067 metres (3,501 ft) long, approximately 31 metres (102 ft) wide and 45 metres (148 ft) high and consists of 19 spans supported by 18 elliptical section reinforced concrete stacks with a constant shape.

The viaduct is constantly monitored by four robots (designed by the Istituto Italiano di Tecnologia) equipped with wheels (with which they were to move along the external rails of the viaduct) and articulated arms. The role of these robots was to automate inspection of the lower surface of the bridge and the cleaning of windproof barriers and solar panels.

The entire metal deck and concrete piers are constantly monitored by a system designed by the CETENA SpA company of the Fincantieri group. The system is made up of 240 fibre optic sensors and constantly detects the movements of the deck, the inclinations of the piles, the vibrations of the structure and the vehicular traffic, providing real-time reports to the manager of the motorway section.

It also has a dehumidification system to prevent the build-up of saline condensation and limit corrosion damage.

== Construction ==
On 18 December 2018, two companies, Salini Impregilo and Fincantieri, were awarded the contract for the construction of the bridge, following the Prime Ministerial Decree of October 4, 2018, whereby Mayor Bucci was appointed Special Commissioner for the Reconstruction of the Polcevera Viaduct on the A10 motorway and which formalized the decision to demolish the remains of the collapsed bridge and replace it entirely. At a cost of 202 million euros and to be built in a year, the development of the executive design was entrusted to Italferr while the direction and supervision, the demolition and construction of the new bridge was entrusted to the RINA certification company for 14 million euros.

On 25 June 2019, the first stone was officially laid with the casting of the base of pile 9 in the presence of various authorities.

From July, the steel sections of the new bridge, made in the Castellammare di Stabia shipyard, were brought to Genoa by barge.

The casting of the concrete slab began on 6 June 2020, and the operation was completed in about ten days.

On 21 July 2020, the mayor of Genoa, Marco Bucci, made official the name of the bridge and its inauguration for 3 August 2020.

Work on the bridge continued even during the COVID-19 pandemic, which involved the imposition of a lockdown across the entire Italian national territory from 9 March to 18 May 2020, thanks to the adoption of safety protocols in force.

With a mix of mourning and joy, the newest bridge in Genoa was inaugurated in honor of the Italian President Sergio Mattarella and other authorities present. The last wishes delivered in a speech by the architect Renzo Piano.

The speed limit on the bridge is 80 km/h (60 km/h for vehicles that weigh more than 12 tons).

== See also ==
- Polcevera
- Val Polcevera
