= Ponte Morandi collapse =

Bridge collapse in Genoa, Italy

2018 Ponte Morandi collapse
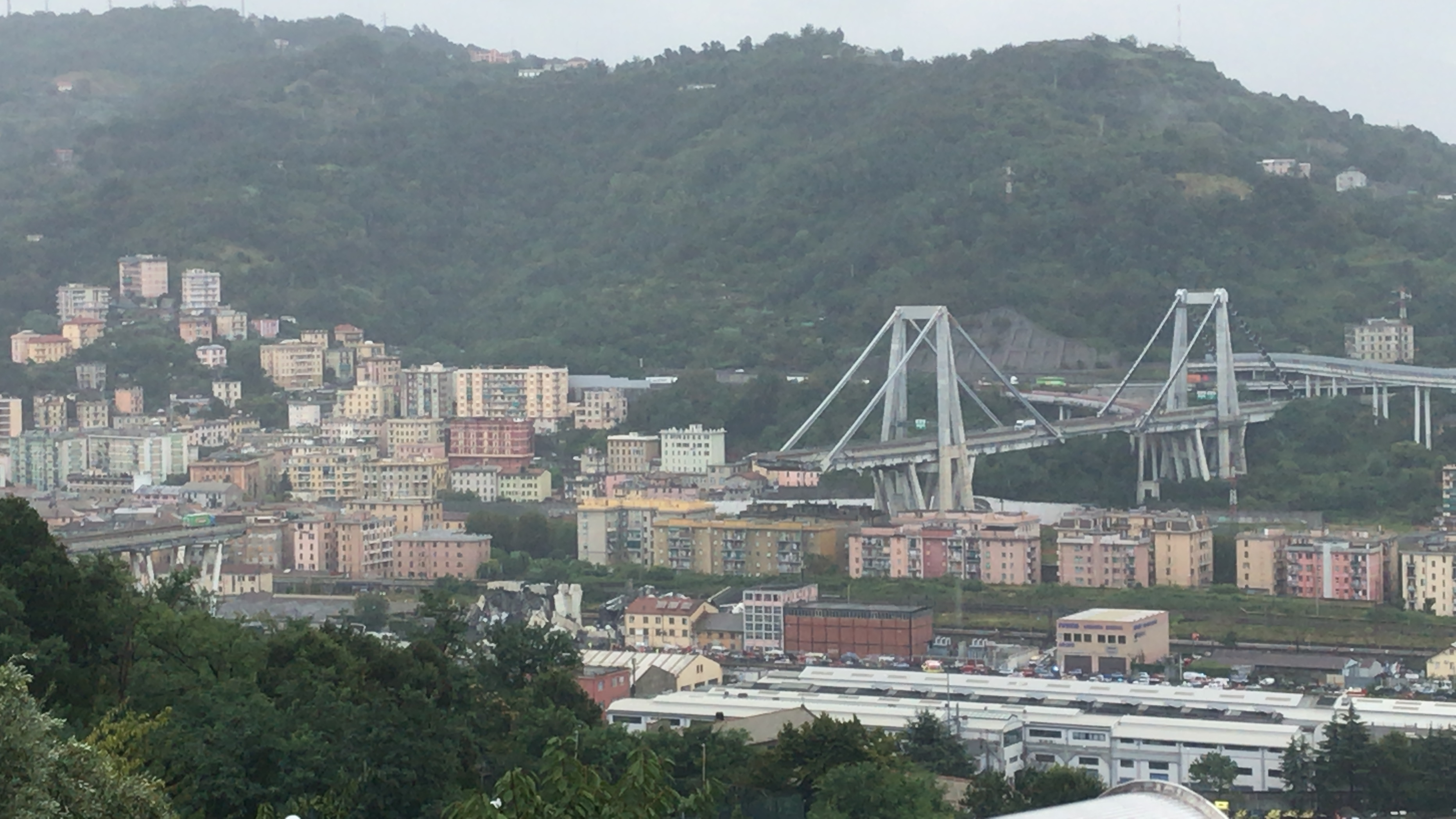
- The collapsed section of the Ponte Morandi
- Date: 14 August 2018; 7 years ago
- Time: 11:36 CEST (09:36 UTC)
- Location: Genoa, Liguria, Italy; 44°25′33″N 08°53′20″E
- Type: Bridge collapse
- Cause: Cable stay corrosion (Official cause still under investigation)
- Deaths: 43
- Injuries: 16

On 14 August 2018, around 11:36 CEST (09:36 UTC) a section of the Ponte Morandi (English: Morandi Bridge) in Genoa, Liguria, Italy, collapsed during a rainstorm, killing forty-three people. The remains were demolished in June 2019. The replacement bridge, the Genoa-Saint George Bridge was inaugurated a year later.

== Background ==
The cable-stayed bridge was designed by civil engineer Riccardo Morandi, from whom its unofficial name was derived. The viaduct was built between 1963 and 1967 along the A10 motorway over the Polcevera River and officially opened on 4 September 1967.

== Collapse ==
On 14 August 2018, around 11:36 CEST (09:36 UTC), during a torrential rainstorm, a 210-meter (690 ft) section of Ponte Morandi collapsed. The collapsed span was centred on the westernmost cable-stayed pillar, pillar 9, and crossed the Polcevera, as well as an industrial area of Sampierdarena. Eyewitnesses reported that the bridge was hit by lightning before it collapsed. Between 30 and 35 cars and three trucks were reported to have fallen from the bridge.

A large part of the collapsed bridge and the vehicles on it fell into the rain-swollen Polcevera. Other parts landed on the tracks of the Turin–Genoa and Milan–Genoa railways, and on warehouses belonging to Ansaldo Energia, an Italian power engineering company. The latter were largely empty because the collapse occurred on the eve of a major Italian public holiday, Ferragosto.

The initial hypotheses were that a structural weakness or a landslide caused the collapse. The bridge was reportedly undergoing maintenance at the time of the collapse, including strengthening the road foundations.

The southern stays reportedly gave way explosively due to corrosion and damage. With only four stays, one of them giving way might have been enough for the structure to lose stability. A preliminary investigative report suggested the pillar itself may have collapsed first, but Genoa prosecutors had not provided the report's authors with a local video showing the southern stays gave way first. There is speculation that lightning may have struck the stays, or a landslide could have destabilised the base.

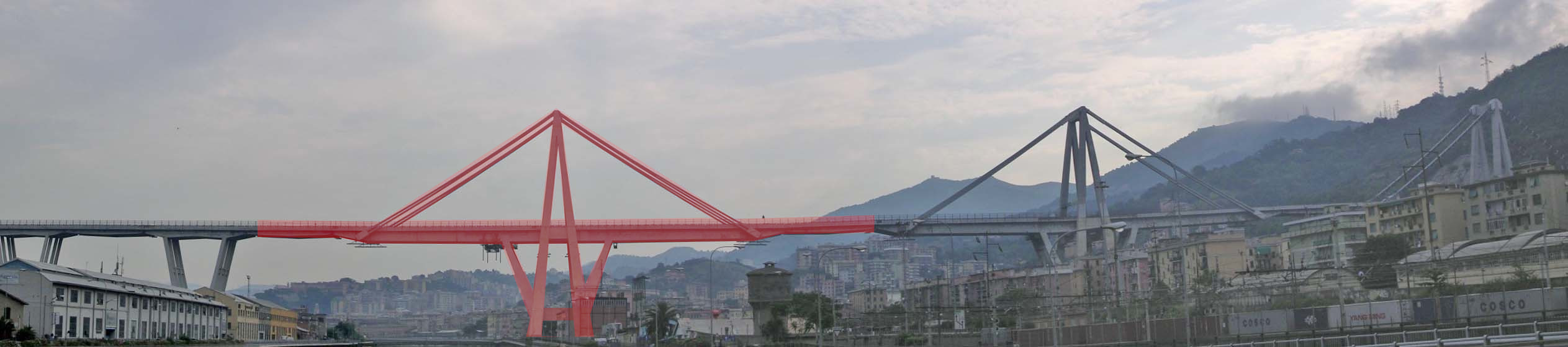
The collapsed part of the bridge is shown in red

In July 2019, a video showing the fall of the bridge was made public. It originated from the nearby Ferrometal company cameras, showing that both southern stays and locally attached road sections at pillar 9 started dropping virtually simultaneously. From the movement of the top crossbeam, the tension cables of the southeastern stay apparently gave way. Immediately, the complete road on the pillar and soon after also the pillar itself fell. However, Autostrade, the company that maintained the bridge, objected that the video still does not show all bridge structures, so it does not really explain the cause.

At the time of the collapse, the bridge was managed by Atlantia S.p.A. (formerly Autostrade S.p.A.), a holding company operating toll motorways and airports, which is controlled by the Benetton family. The family waited two days to release a company public statement offering condolences to victims and their families.

The disaster caused a major political controversy about the poor state of infrastructure in Italy and raised wider questions about the condition of bridges across Europe. According to the Corriere della Sera, this was the 11th bridge collapse in Italy since 2013.

It was later decided that the bridge would not be repaired, but demolished. Demolition began in February 2019 and was completed on 28 June 2019.

=== Victims and rescue efforts ===
Casualties by citizenship
Citizenship	Dead
Italy	29
France	4
Chile	3
Albania	2
Colombia	1
Jamaica	1
Moldova	1
Peru	1
Romania	1
Total	43

Forty-three people were confirmed dead and 16 injured. The victims included 29 Italian citizens, four French citizens, three Chilean citizens, two Albanian citizens, and one citizen each from Colombia, Jamaica, Moldova, Peru, and Romania.

Survivors were transported to nearby hospitals, many in critical condition. Davide Capello, the former goalkeeper for Cagliari, survived without injury and was able to walk away from his car, even though it had dropped 30 metres (100 ft) before becoming wedged between parts of the fallen bridge.

The area under the remaining part of the bridge, including several homes, was evacuated. As of 02:00 the following day (midnight UTC), 12 people were known still to be missing, and voices could be heard calling from underneath the debris; rescue efforts were continuing by floodlight using techniques commonly deployed after earthquakes. The number of known dead grew to 43 as of four days after the event.

=== Aftermath and reactions ===
The railways connecting Genoa Sampierdarena (and Genoa Piazza Principe) with Genoa Borzoli and Genoa Rivarolo were closed immediately as a result of the bridge's collapse. A rail replacement bus service was established between the stations.

The day after the collapse, Prime Minister Giuseppe Conte declared a state of emergency for the Liguria region, which would last for a year. According to deputy minister of infrastructure Edoardo Rixi, the entire bridge would be demolished.

The Italian Football Federation announced that a minute of silence would be held for the victims of the collapse before all football events across the country during the weekend that followed the incident. On 16 August, the Lega Serie A postponed the opening 2018–19 Serie A matches for both Genoese association football clubs Genoa and Sampdoria that were originally scheduled for 19 August.

Italian transport minister Danilo Toninelli, who had started in office on 1 June 2018, described the incident as "an immense tragedy", but it was pointed out that his Five Star Movement political party had said in 2012 that the risk of a collapse of Morandi Bridge was just a silly fairy tale, because "the bridge would have lasted another hundred years", quoting a 2009 evaluation by Autostrade.

Governor Giovanni Toti said that the loss of the bridge was an "incident of vast proportions on a vital arterial road, not just for Genoa, but for the whole country". The disaster resulted in a drop in the stock price of the road's operator, Atlantia, by 5% the same day and by 25% two days later.

A state funeral was held on 18 August, inside the Fiera di Genova event arena, for 18 victims of the collapse, along with recognition for the firefighters and other rescue workers. Some of the victims' families refused to attend the service and instead hosted private funerals. The funeral was attended by Italian politicians, such as President Sergio Mattarella, Prime Minister Giuseppe Conte, interior minister Matteo Salvini, transport minister Danilo Toninelli, and the secretary of the Democratic Party Maurizio Martina.

In mid-2020, control of the infrastructure company was given back to the government after legislators had reduced the penalty for changing the ownership structure.

In 2021 the footbridge immediately next to the Morandi Bridge (previously called Ponte delle Ratelle) was named Passerella 14 agosto 2018.

==== Trials ====
Various criminal charges, up to and including manslaughter, were laid against 59 individuals, many of them employees of Autostrade per l’Italia. The most high-profile defendant was Giovanni Castellucci, chief executive of the company at the time of the collapse. The trial began with an initial hearing in July 2022.

In July 2026, Castellucci was sentenced to 12 years in jail. He was already serving time for an earlier road disaster. His deputy, Paolo Berti, was jailed for five-and-a half-years while Michele Donferri Mitelli, another official, got 11 years.

==== Infrastructure ====
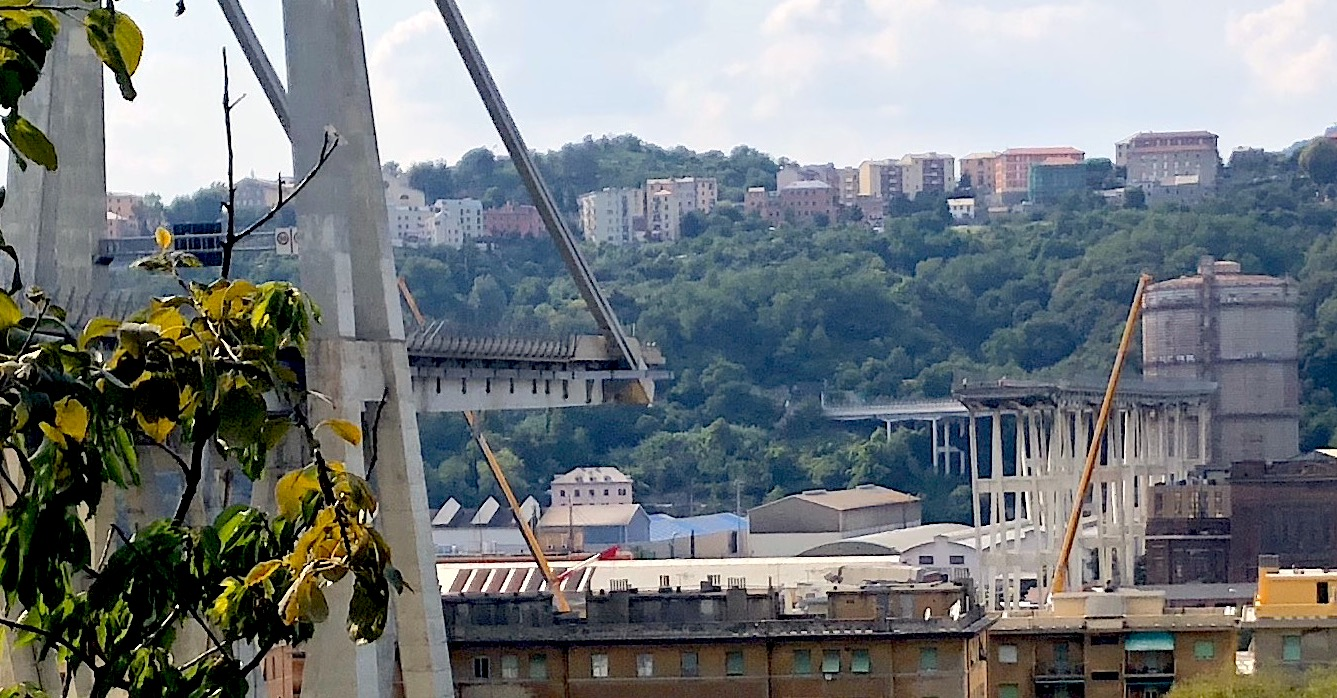
View of the bridge after the collapse in August 2018

The collapse raised concerns about the general condition of infrastructure in Europe, with studies in Italy, France, and Germany suggesting that a significant number of bridges are in need of renovation or replacement due to corrosion and structural deterioration. Infrastructure investment in Italy was reduced dramatically after the 2008 financial crisis. A resident of Genoa told reporters: "The central government will scapegoat the bridge company, the company will scapegoat someone else — they're all to blame. We all know how bad our infrastructure is in Italy."

The ruling coalition put pressure on the managers of the road, Autostrade per l'Italia (which is part of the Atlantia group). Deputy Prime Minister Luigi Di Maio claimed that they were "definitely to blame." Minister of the Interior Matteo Salvini also blamed European Union budget rules and limitations on deficit and state debt, to which the European Commission opposed a denial. The position of the Benetton family, whose company owns 30% of Atlantia, has also come under scrutiny. Autostrade per l’Italia's chief executive, Giovanni Castellucci, said that the bridge would be rebuilt within eight months.

==== Investigative committee ====
The investigative committee was to be chaired by Roberto Ferrazza and to have as an expert member Antonio Brencich. However, these two committee members were immediately criticised for being among the signatories of the February 2018 government report that failed to impose precautionary measures on the weakened bridge. On 23 August 2018, Brencich resigned from the inspection commission, and Minister Danilo Toninelli removed Ferrazza as the chair, for "reasons of opportunity in relation to all the institutions involved in this affair".

==== NASA satellite data research ====
Scientists from NASA's Jet Propulsion Laboratory in Pasadena, California, developed a method of analyzing satellite data to detect millimeter-sized changes. Their analysis suggests that the deck between pier 10 and pier 11 had minimal movements until early 2015 and that between March 2017 and August 2018, a significant increase in structural changes occurred (noting that the collapsed pier is pier 9, without any consequential damage to piers 10 and 11, and the between deck). The research and imagery were forwarded to the Italian authorities for further evaluation.

=== Symbol ===
A Volvo FM truck belonging to Damonte Trasporti S.R.L. and providing services for Basko Supermercati, painted in blue and green, became a widely publicised symbol of the disaster because it remained standing almost at the edge of the collapsed section. The 37-year-old driver at the time of the accident recounted to the media how he looked in shock as the bridge busy with dense traffic collapsed in front of him, and how he brought his vehicle to a stop and ran back to firm ground.

=== Demolition and replacement ===
The last two cable-stayed pillars (10 and 11) of the bridge were demolished using a tonne of explosives on 28 June 2019. The complete bridge was planned to be removed, along with multiple houses in the surrounding area.

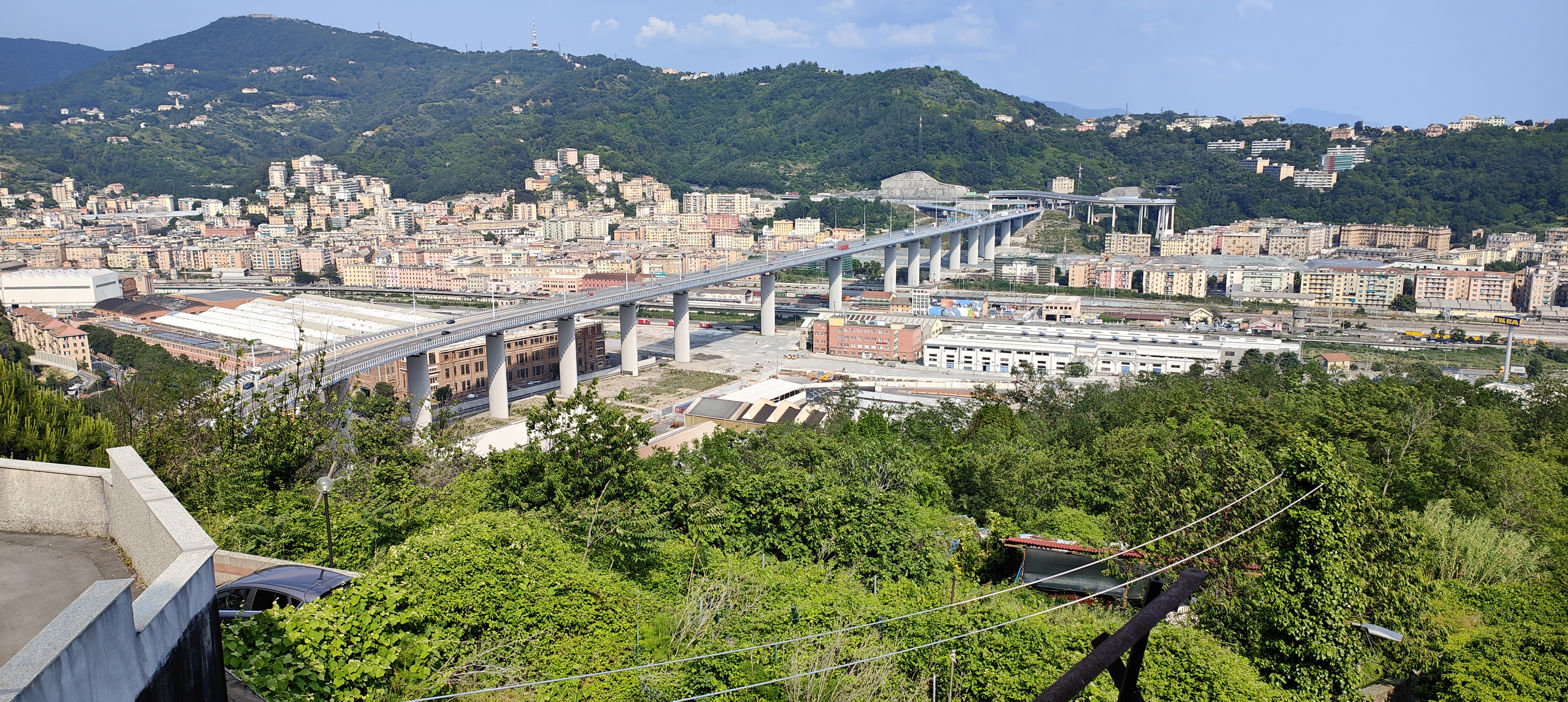
Genoa-Saint George Bridge in May 2023

Construction began on the replacement Genoa-Saint George Bridge, designed by Italian Genoese-born architect Renzo Piano, on 25 June 2019, and it was completed in the spring of 2020. It was inaugurated on 3 August 2020.

== See also ==
- List of bridge failures
