= 2013 Monteforte Irpino bus crash =

Road incident in Italy

Coordinates: 40°54′37″N 14°40′21″E

Details
- Date: 28 July 2013
- Location: near Monteforte Irpino, Italy

Statistics
- Deaths: 40
- Injured: 8

Forty people were killed and another eight were injured in a bus crash near the town of Monteforte Irpino in Italy on 28 July 2013.

== Accident ==
The bus was carrying pilgrims to their home from a visit to a Catholic shrine and fell nearly 100 metres (330 ft) feet off a bridge east of Naples. The bus carried nearly 50 passengers.

=== Dynamics of the accident ===
At about 19:40 a Volvo B12 Echo coach owned by the travel agency Mondo Travel, coming from Telese Terme and Pietrelcina, entered the A16 motorway via the RA9 motorway link in Benevento heading toward Naples and Pozzuoli. On board were 48 people (47 passengers and the driver, Ciro Lametta). During the journey, after passing the Avellino East and Avellino West toll booths, the bus began climbing in the territory of Monteforte Irpino when many passengers heard strange noises coming from inside the vehicle and alerted the driver, who nevertheless continued driving. After the Quattro Cupe tunnel in Monteforte Irpino, at about 20:30, a universal joint in the drive shaft broke, severing the braking system. At that point the bus became uncontrollable and could no longer brake in any way.

The coach began swerving, striking several cars and commercial vehicles that were stuck in motorway traffic because of roadworks. It then collided with the guardrail of the Acqualonga viaduct. The driver attempted in every possible way to bring the vehicle back onto the roadway, but after striking other vehicles the bus hit the viaduct a second time. The outer Jersey barriers (which, after several inspections and court rulings, were later found to be unsafe) failed to withstand the impact of the bus, allowing it to fall from the viaduct more than 30 metres into the valley below.

== Victims ==
Thirty-eight bodies and ten injured people were extracted from the wreckage of the bus, including all the children who had been on board. Two of the injured later died from their wounds: Simona and Silvana Del Giudice (the youngest among the victims; the youngest died on 6 August at only 16 years of age) and Salvatore Di Bonito, aged 54, who died on 7 September.

The state funerals of the first 38 victims were held at the Pozzuoli sports arena on 31 July 2013 in the presence of the highest offices of the Italian state. The victims were:

- Immacolata Ambrosio
- Anna Acquarulo, 64
- Assunta Artiaco, 61
- Gennaro Artiaco, 74
- Carolina Basile, 58
- Giovanni Basile, 53
- Salvatore Bruno, 67
- Luciano Caiazzo, 40
- Mario Caiazzo, 54
- Maria Carannante, 59
- Raffaela Chiocca, 72
- Giovanni Conte, 50
- Maria Luisa Corsale, 63
- Antonio Del Giudice, 50
- Silvana Del Giudice, 22
- Simona Del Giudice, 16
- Teresa Delle Cave, 68
- Salvatore Di Bonito, 54
- Filomena Di Paolo, 50
- Gennaro Esposito, 58
- Agnese Illiano, 73
- Barbara Illiano, 63
- Olga Iodice, 72
- Elisabetta Iuliano, 78
- Ciro Lametta, 44 (Note: He was the bus driver and the brother of Gennaro Lametta, the owner responsible for the vehicle.)
- Giuseppina Lucignano, 82
- Anna Mirelli, 48
- Irene Musto, 74
- Procolo Paone, 84
- Pasquale Parrella, 62
- Anna Raiola, 83
- Teresa Restivo, 32
- Luigia Rocco
- Antonietta Rusciano, 48
- Maria Rosaria Rusciano, 51
- Maria Elisabetta Russo, 64
- Alfonso Terracciano, 68
- Salvatore Testa, 88
- Vincenza Trincone, 49
- Biagio Vallefuoco, 54

== Verdicts ==
=== First-instance verdict ===
After five and a half years, in 2019 the court of Avellino delivered the first-instance verdicts for the 15 defendants involved in the Acqualonga viaduct crash trial.

==== Mondo Travel company ====
- Gennaro Lametta: 12 years, confirmed as a conviction.

==== Naples Motor Vehicle Authority ====
- Antonietta Ceriola: requested 9 years, sentenced to 8 years.
- Vittorio Saulino: requested 6 years and 6 months, later acquitted.

==== Autostrade per l'Italia ====
- CEO Giovanni Castellucci: requested 10 years, initially acquitted (later sentenced by the Court of Cassation on 10 April 2025 to 6 years in prison).
- Section director Paolo Berti: requested 10 years, sentenced to 5 years and 6 months.
- Former general director Riccardo Mollo: requested 10 years, acquitted.
- Manager Michele Renzi: requested 10 years, sentenced to 5 years.
- Manager Nicola Spadavecchia: requested 10 years, sentenced to 6 years.
- Manager Bruno Gerardi: requested 10 years, sentenced to 5 years.
- Manager Michele Maietta: requested 10 years, acquitted.
- Manager Gianluca De Franceschi: requested 10 years, sentenced to 6 years.
- Manager Gianni Marrone: requested 10 years, sentenced to 5 years and 6 months.
- Manager Massimo Fornaci: requested 10 years, acquitted.
- Manager Marco Perna: requested 10 years, acquitted.
- Manager Antonio Sorrentino: requested 10 years, acquitted.

=== Appeals and Court of Cassation ===
In 2023, between July and September, the Avellino court delivered the appeal verdicts, confirming the sentences previously imposed and confirming the prison sentence for Gennaro Lametta. In detail, Giovanni Castellucci, former CEO of Autostrade per l'Italia, was sentenced to six years after having been acquitted at first instance. Other company executives, including Mollo, Fornaci, and Perna, also received six-year sentences. However, the sentences for Spadavecchia and Berti were reduced to five years, while Marrone, De Franceschi, and Gerardi were sentenced to three years each. The legal case concluded with the confirmation of all convictions by the Court of Cassation on 11 April 2025. The convictions concerned several executives of Autostrade per l'Italia, two officials of the Motorizzazione Civile of Naples, and especially Gennaro Lametta, considered the main person responsible for the failure to regularize the vehicle for road circulation.

== See also ==
- List of traffic collisions (2000–present)
