= Wadi el Kuf Bridge =

Wadi el Kuf Bridge جسر وادي الكوف Jisr Wadi Al Kuf
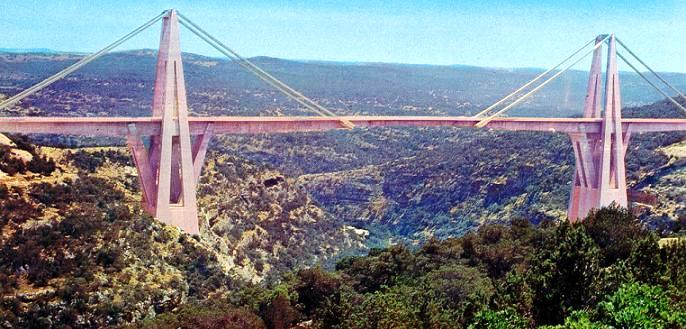
- Coordinates: 32.696545°N 21.56561°E
- Carries: Msah Rode
- Locale: Bayda, Libya

Characteristics
- Design: Cable-stayed
- Material: Reinforced concrete
- Total length: 477 m
- Width: 13.3 m
- Longest span: 282 m
- Clearance above: 172 m

History
- Designer: Riccardo Morandi
- Constructed by: C.S.C
- Construction start: 1967
- Construction end: 1971
- Opened: 1972

Location
- Interactive map of Wadi el Kuf Bridge

Wadi el Kuf Bridge (Formal Arabic: جسر وادي الكوف, Jisr Wadi Al Kuf), is a bridge located 20 km west of Bayda, Libya. It is the second highest bridge in Africa.

== History ==
It was designed by Italian civil engineer Riccardo Morandi. Construction of the bridge began in 1965 and the bridge was opened in 1972. The bridge crosses the Kouf Valley. It is about 282 meters long, and 160 meters in height. Its construction cost $5.3 million US.
For seven years, its 282 meters central span was the longest concrete cable-stayed bridge span in the world.

On 25 October 2017, the Security Directorate of the Green Mountain region in east Libya called on the security services to close down Wadi el Kuf Bridge, following inspections that identified potential fractures in the bridge. The following day, road transport engineers inspected the bridge and stated that it needed emergency maintenance but was safe. On 27 October 2017, the bridge was reopened for light traffic, while local security officials were preventing heavily loaded trucks from crossing in groups. On 8 August 2018 another similar security alert has been reported, but no details about another bridge closure or the structural problems identified is available.

A similar bridge in Genoa, also designed by Morandi and usually called Ponte Morandi, where—unlike Wadi el Kuf—structural problems had been known since the first years after construction in 1967, failed when one of its 3 towers collapsed on 14 August 2018, killing 43.
