= Giovanni Castellucci =

Italian criminal (born 1959)

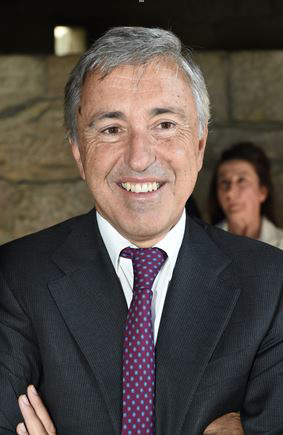
- Castellucci in 2018
- Born: 23 July 1959 (age 67); Senigallia, Italy
- Citizenship: Italy
- Education: University of Florence
- Occupation: Former businessman
- Criminal charges: manslaughter and negligence in relation to the 2013 Monteforte Irpino bus crash
- Penalty: 6 years in prison 12 years in prison

Details
- Date apprehended: 11 April 2025 (17 months ago)

Giovanni Castellucci (born 23 July 1959) is an Italian former businessman who served as the chief executive officer (CEO) of Autostrade per l'Italia and Atlantia. In 2023, he was convicted of manslaughter and negligence in relation to the 2013 Monteforte Irpino bus crash, after having been acquitted at the initial trial. The conviction was upheld by the Court of Cassation in 2025, and Castellucci was sentenced to six years in prison.

== Early life and education ==
Castellucci was born on 23 July 1959 in Senigallia, Italy. He earned a degree in mechanical engineering from the University of Florence and later earned a Master of Business Administration (MBA) from the Bocconi University School of Management in Milan.

== Career ==
=== Early career ===
Castellucci worked for the Boston Consulting Group (BCG) from 1988 to 1999 at its Paris and Milan offices, where he became a partner and lead of the Italian customer service and pharmaceutical practices.

=== Autostrade ===
In January 2000, Castellucci was appointed CEO of the Barilla Group. The following year, he joined the Autostrade Group as a general manager. From April 2005 to January 2019, he served as CEO of Autostrade per l'Italia.

=== Atlantia and the Abertis operation ===
In April 2006, Castellucci became CEO of the Autostrade Group, which was later renamed Atlantia. In March 2018, the Atlantia Group acquired a 15.49% stake in the Eurotunnel. Castellucci took on the position of Chief Executive Officer of the new holding. In November 2013, he became a board director of Aeroporti di Roma. Castellucci acquired the Spanish infrastructure company Abertis, which has been acquired by Atlantia following an agreement with ACS and Hochtief. On the 17th of September 2019, Castellucci resigned from both his positions as Chief Executive Officer and General Manager of Atlantia.

=== 2013 Bus Crash Trials ===
On July 28, 2013, a bus on the A16 motorway plunged off a viaduct near Monteforte Irpino (Avellino), killing 40 people. Multiple former and current managers at Autostrade, including Castellucci, were charged with multiple counts of negligent homicide and criminal negligence in connection with the incident.

On January 11, 2019, Castellucci was acquitted by the Court of Avellino. In 2023, the Court of Appeal of Naples overturned the acquittal and sentenced him to serve six years in prison. The Court of Cassation upheld the conviction on 11 April 2025.

=== 2018 Morandi Bridge Collapse Trial and Conviction ===
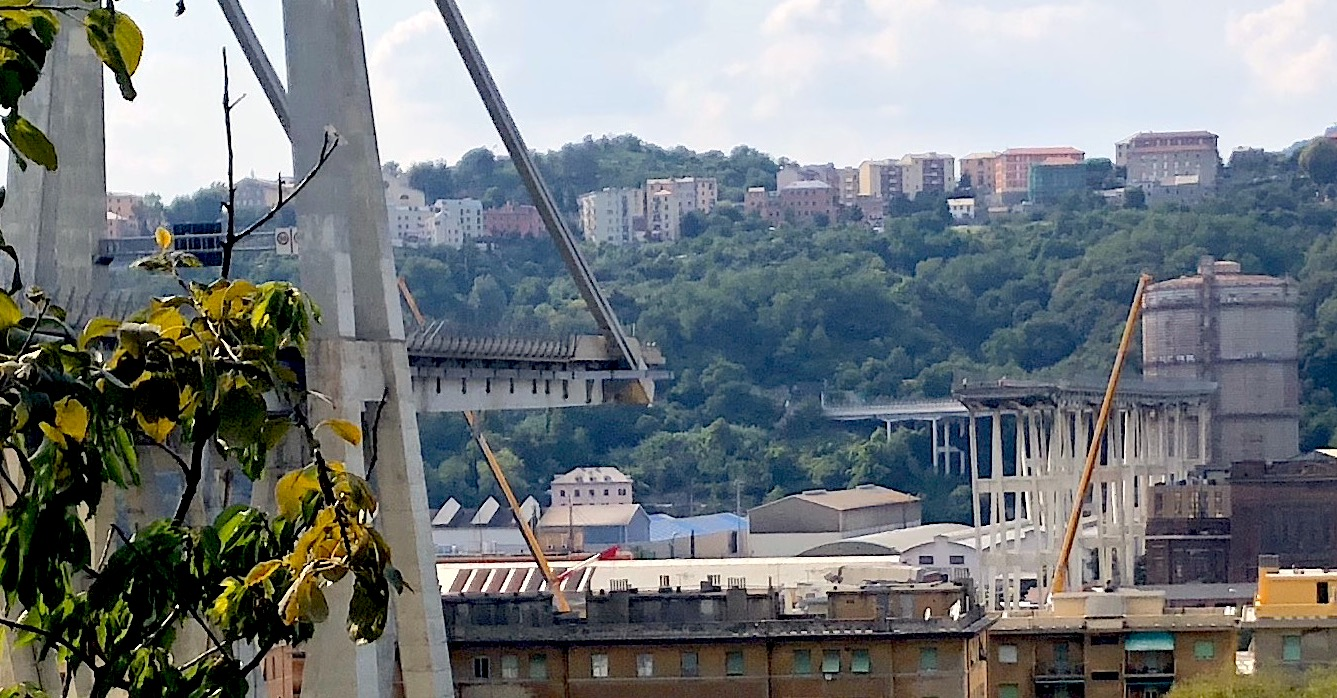
View of the Ponte Morandi in Genoa after the collapse in August 2018

On August 14, 2018 at 11:36am, the Ponte Morandi Bridge in Genoa collapsed, killing 43 people. Caselucci was tried along with 59 other individuals for culpability in the collapse. On July 16, 2026, he was convicted and sentenced to 12 years in prison adding to his previous sentence for the 2013 bus crash.

== Awards ==
In 2016, he was appointed a Knight of the Legion of Honour during a ceremony at Palazzo Farnese.

== See also ==
- Autostrade of Italy
- Aeroporti di Roma
