= Laureano Gómez bridge =

Laureano Gómez bridge Puente Laureano Gómez
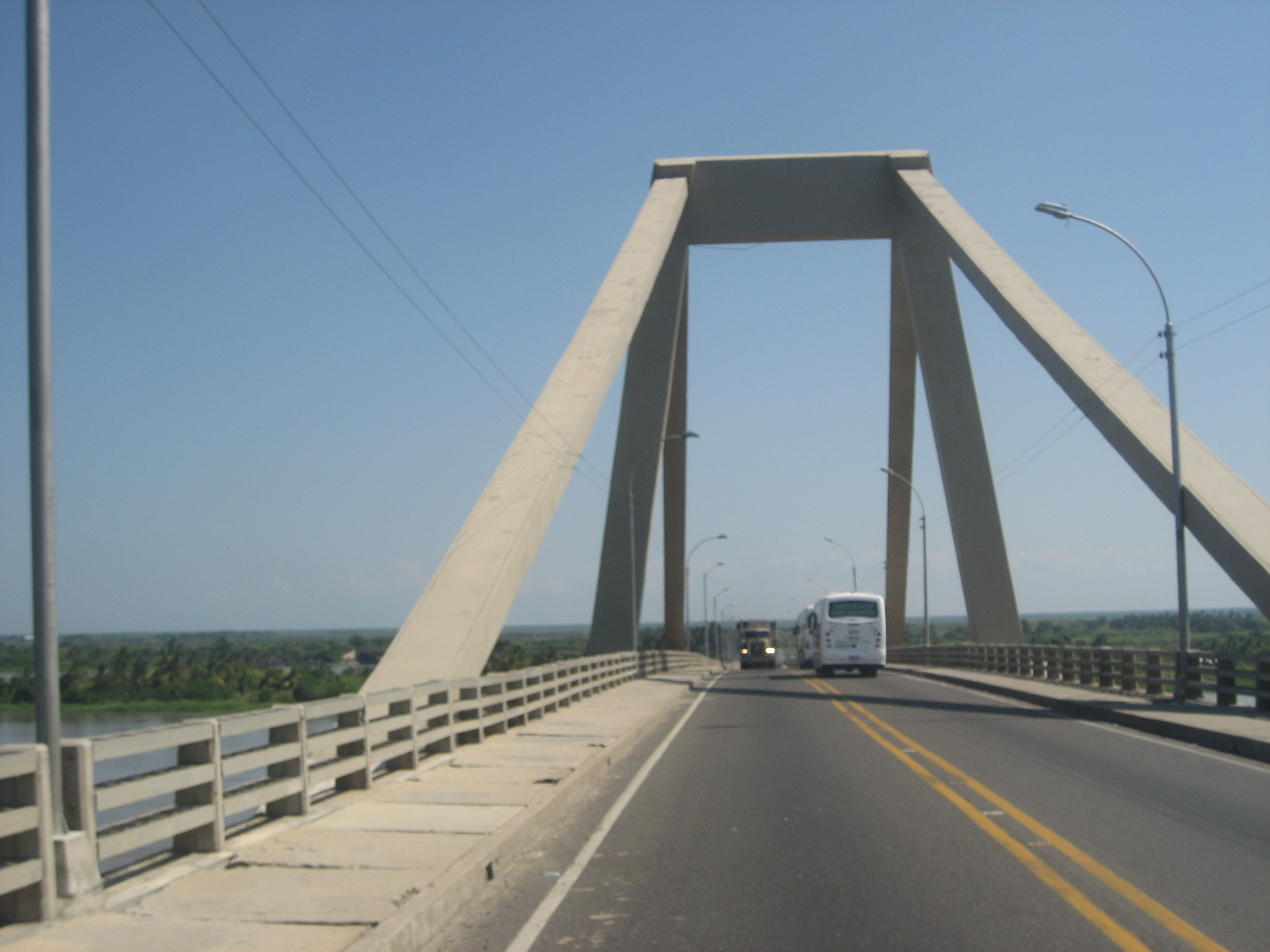
- Coordinates: 10°57′03″N 74°45′09″W
- Carries: Ruta Nacional 90
- Crosses: Magdalena River
- Locale: Barranquilla, Colombia
- Other name(s): Pumarejo Bridge
- Named for: Alberto Pumarejo

Characteristics
- Total length: 1,500 m (4,900 ft)
- Width: 12.5 m (41 ft)
- Traversable?: yes
- Longest span: 140 m (460 ft)

History
- Construction start: 1970
- Construction end: 1974

The Laureano Gómez bridge (Spanish: Puente Laureano Gómez), popularly known as Pumarejo bridge (Spanish: Puente Pumarejo) after its promoter Alberto Pumarejo, is a bridge in Colombia, built over the Magdalena River to connect the Salamanca Island Road Park and the city of Barranquilla. The bridge was designed by Riccardo Morandi and built by an Italian-Colombian group between 1970 and 1974. The entire bridge is based on piles that go down to 30 meters (98 ft) below the water level and is 1,500 meters (4,900 ft) long and 12.5 meters (41 ft) wide, with a main span of 140 meters (460 ft), and is built of concrete.

This Pumarejo Bridge, which has generated controversy since its design stage because of its poor technical characteristics, especially its limited gauge which prevented the development of river navigation on the Magdalena River, was replaced on 20 December 2019 by the new Alberto Pumarejo bridge. The old bridge will possibly be demolished, at least the central part, which prevents river navigation.
