= Pumarejo bridge =

Puente Pumarejo
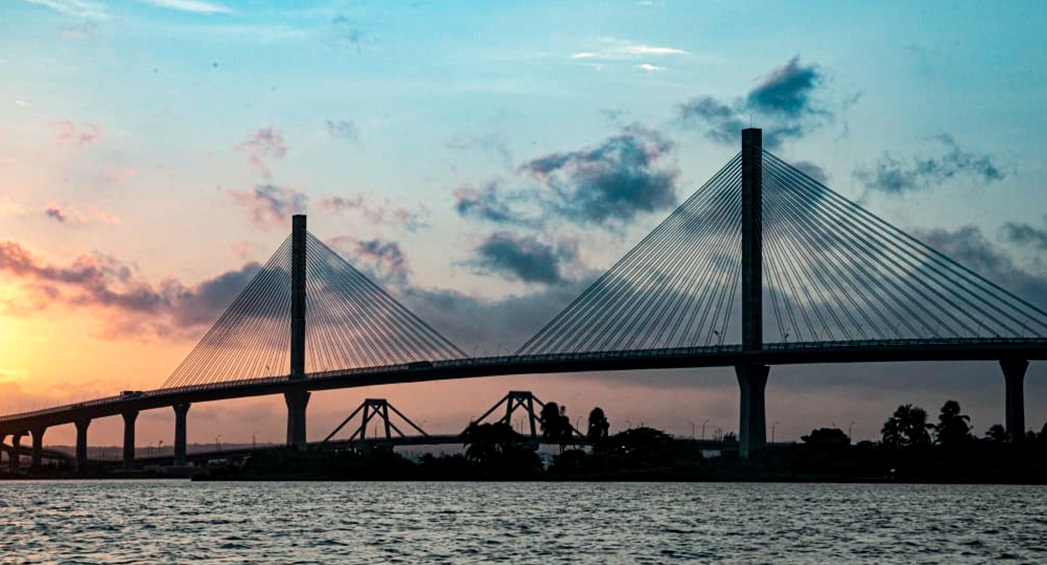
- View of the bridge, in April 2023. (the old Pumarejo bridge in the foreground)
- Coordinates: 10.9503°N 74.7562°W
- Carries: 6 lanes (3 lanes each way, plus bike and footpaths)
- Crosses: Magdalena River
- Locale: Barranquilla and Salamanca Island Road Park, Colombia
- Official name: Puente Alberto Pumarejo

Characteristics
- Total length: 3,237 meters (10,620 ft)
- Width: 38.1 meters (125 ft)
- Longest span: 380 meters (1,250 ft)
- Clearance below: 45 meters (148 ft)

History
- Opened: 20 December 2019
- Replaces: Laureano Gómez bridge

Location
- Interactive map of Puente Pumarejo

The Pumarejo bridge (Spanish: Puente Pumarejo) is a bridge over the Río Magdalena in Barranquilla and the Salamanca Island Road Park in Sitionuevo, Colombia, which has connected the city with the east of the country since December 20th 2019.

It replaces the old Puente Pumarejo, which fulfilled this task between 1974 and 2019, but for which a bridge with a clearance below of only 16 meters (52 ft) was chosen for cost reasons, which soon criticized as an obstacle for shipping on the Río Magdalena has been. The two lanes no longer did justice to the increased traffic. Since the bridge was nearing the end of its expected lifespan, the decision was made in 2006 to build a much larger new one.

== Description ==
Construction of the bridge, a few meters south of the previous bridge, started in 2012 and was completed by mid-December 2019. The Pumarejo bridge was named after the former regional politician Alberto Mario Pumarejo Vengoechea. The 2,250-meter (7,380 ft) bridge is the longest road bridge in Colombia. With its almost 990-meter (3,250 ft) long driveways, it has a total length of 3,237 meters (10,620 ft). It is a cable-stayed bridge with a span of 380 meters (1,250 ft) and a width of 38.1 meters (125 ft), divided into six lanes and side bike paths. The stay cables arranged in the central axis are attached to two pylon poles that are also in the central axis. The clearance below of 45 meters (148 ft) will allow the passage of handysize freighters as soon as parts of the old bridge are torn down.

The project will increase the central passage of ships up to 15,000 tons to 45 meters, which will increase port capacity for trade and improve the country's competitiveness. In addition, larger-sized ships can enter the inland ports across the Magdalena River in the Metropolitan area of Barranquilla.

After the bridge's inauguration, the old bridge was closed to traffic. It is discussed whether it will be torn down completely or partially remain as a tourist attraction.
