= Monteforte Irpino =

- Comune
- Comune di Monteforte Irpino
- Location within Italy Location within Campania
- Coordinates: 40°53′34″N 14°43′10″E
- Country: Italy
- Region: Campania
- Province: Avellino (AV)
- Frazioni: Alvanella, Campi, Fenestrelle, Gaudi, Molinelle, Vetreria

Government
  - Mayor: Costantino Giordano

Area
  - Total: 26.70 km^{2} (10.31 sq mi)
- Elevation: 502 m (1,647 ft)

Population (31 August 2011)
  - Total: 10,415
  - Density: 390.1/km^{2} (1,010/sq mi)
- Demonym: Montefortesi
- Time zone: UTC+1 (CET)
  - Summer (DST): UTC+2 (CEST)
- Postal code: 83024
- Dialing code: 0825
- Patron saint: St. Martin
- Saint day: 11 November
- Website: Official website

Monteforte Irpino is a town and comune in the province of Avellino, Campania, Italy. A bus crash near the town killed 40 people in 2013. The victims were pilgrims coming home from a trip to a Catholic shrine when the bus slid off a road near Monteforte Irpino and fell 30 metres (100 ft) off a bridge.
