= Riccardo Morandi =

Italian civil engineer

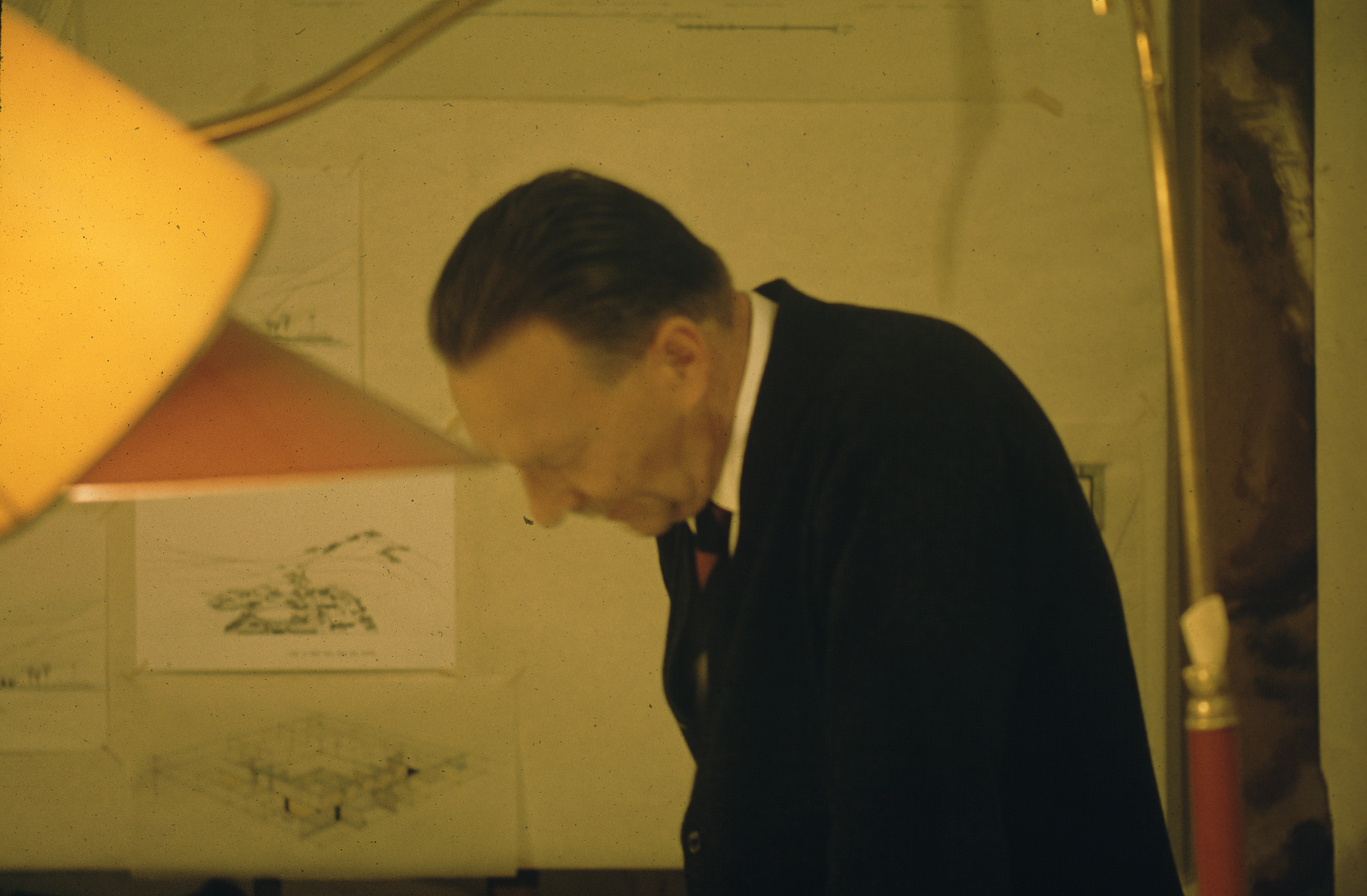
Riccardo Morandi visiting Palace of Justice Competition.

Riccardo Morandi (1 September 1902 – 25 December 1989) was an Italian civil engineer best known for his innovative use of reinforced concrete and prestressed concrete, although over the years some of his particular cable-stayed bridges have had some maintenance trouble.

Amongst his best-known works are the General Rafael Urdaneta Bridge, an 8 km (5 mi) cable-stayed bridge crossing Lake Maracaibo in Venezuela; a similar bridge in Genoa commonly known as Ponte Morandi (officially Viadotto Polcevera), which partially collapsed in 2018 for reasons under investigation; and the Subterranean Automobile Showroom in Turin.

== Career ==
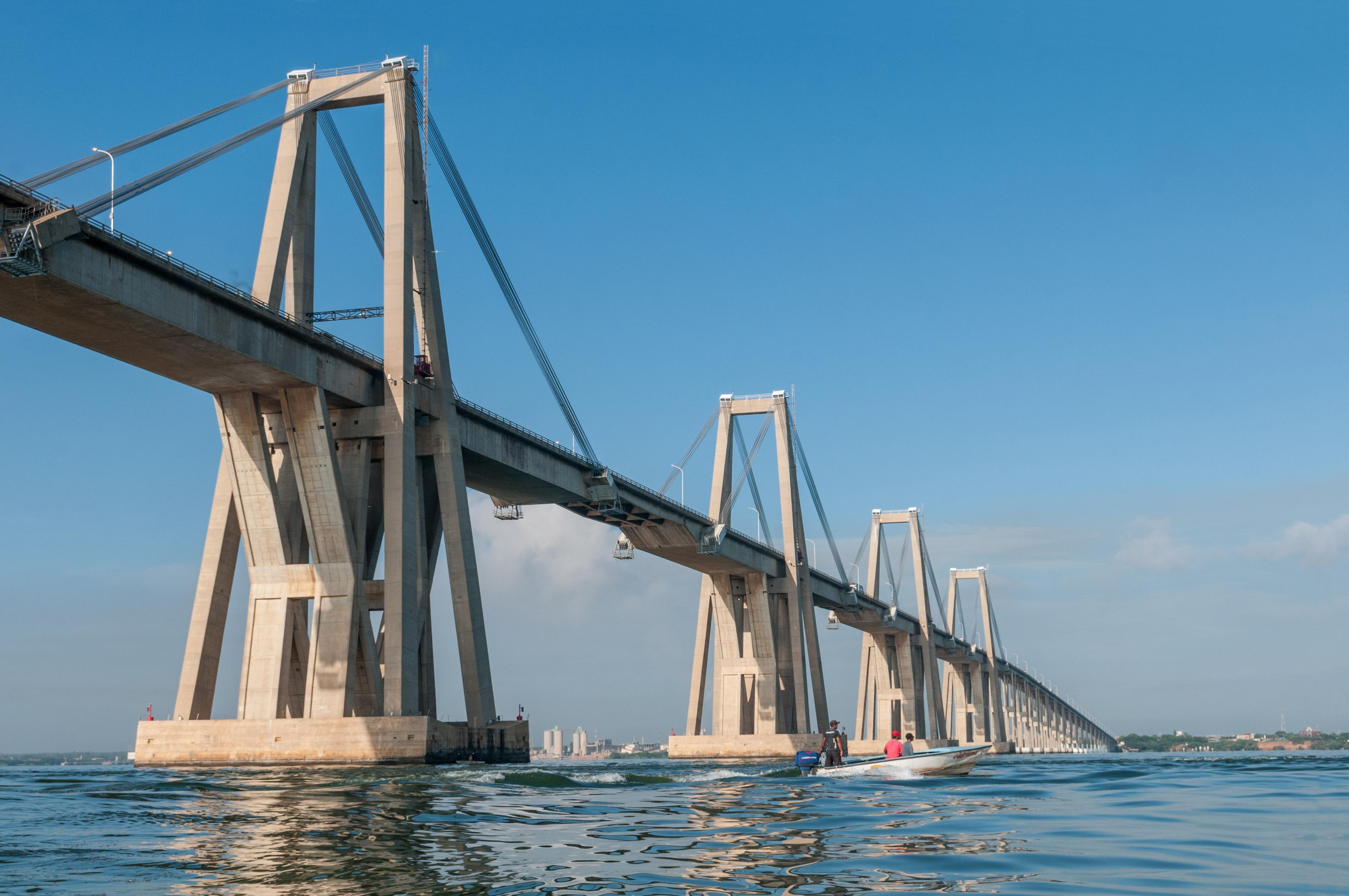
General Rafael Urdaneta Bridge, 1962 Maracaibo, Venezuela (2013 photo).

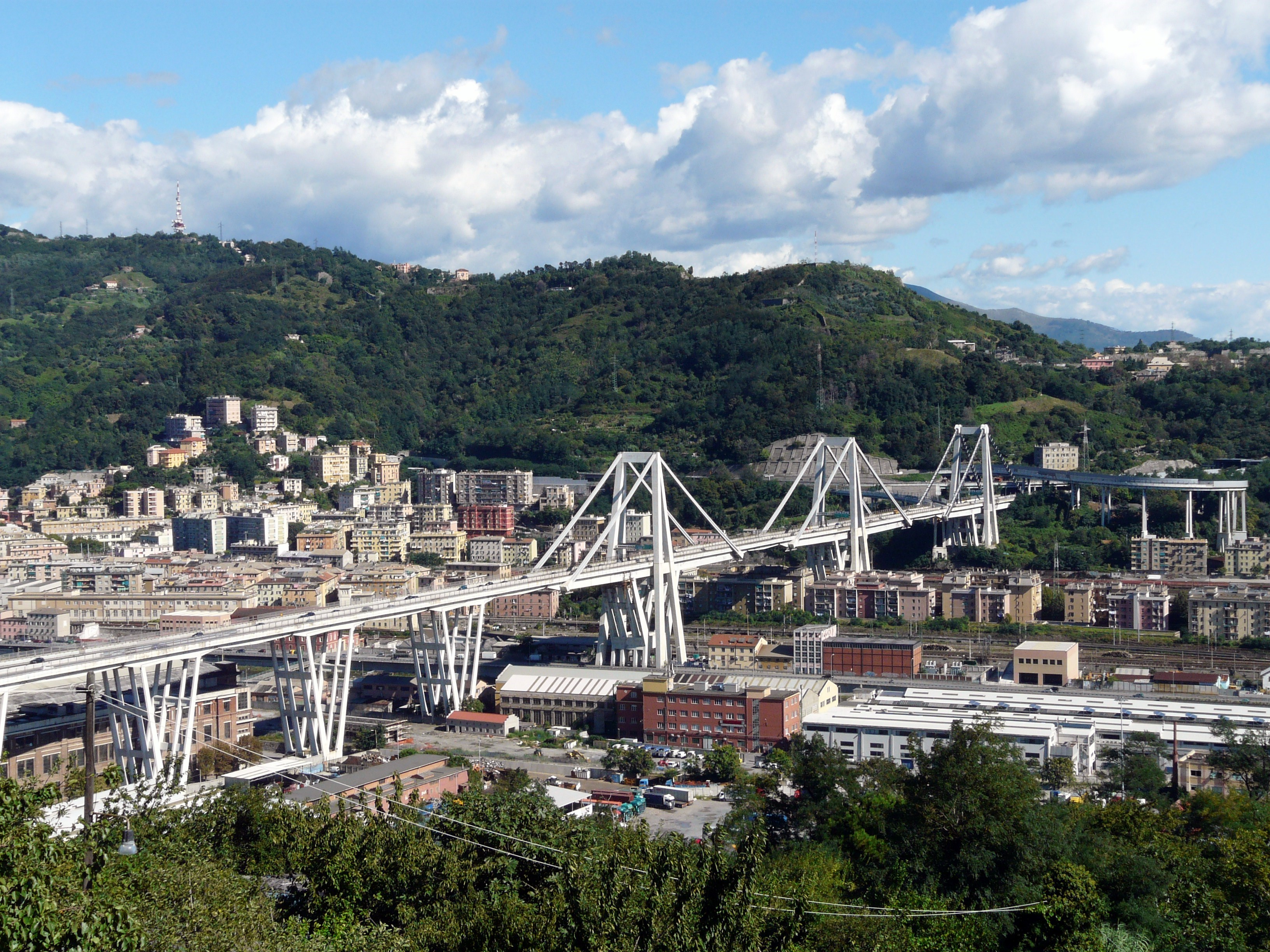
Viadotto Polcevera, 1967 Genoa, Italy (2010 photo)

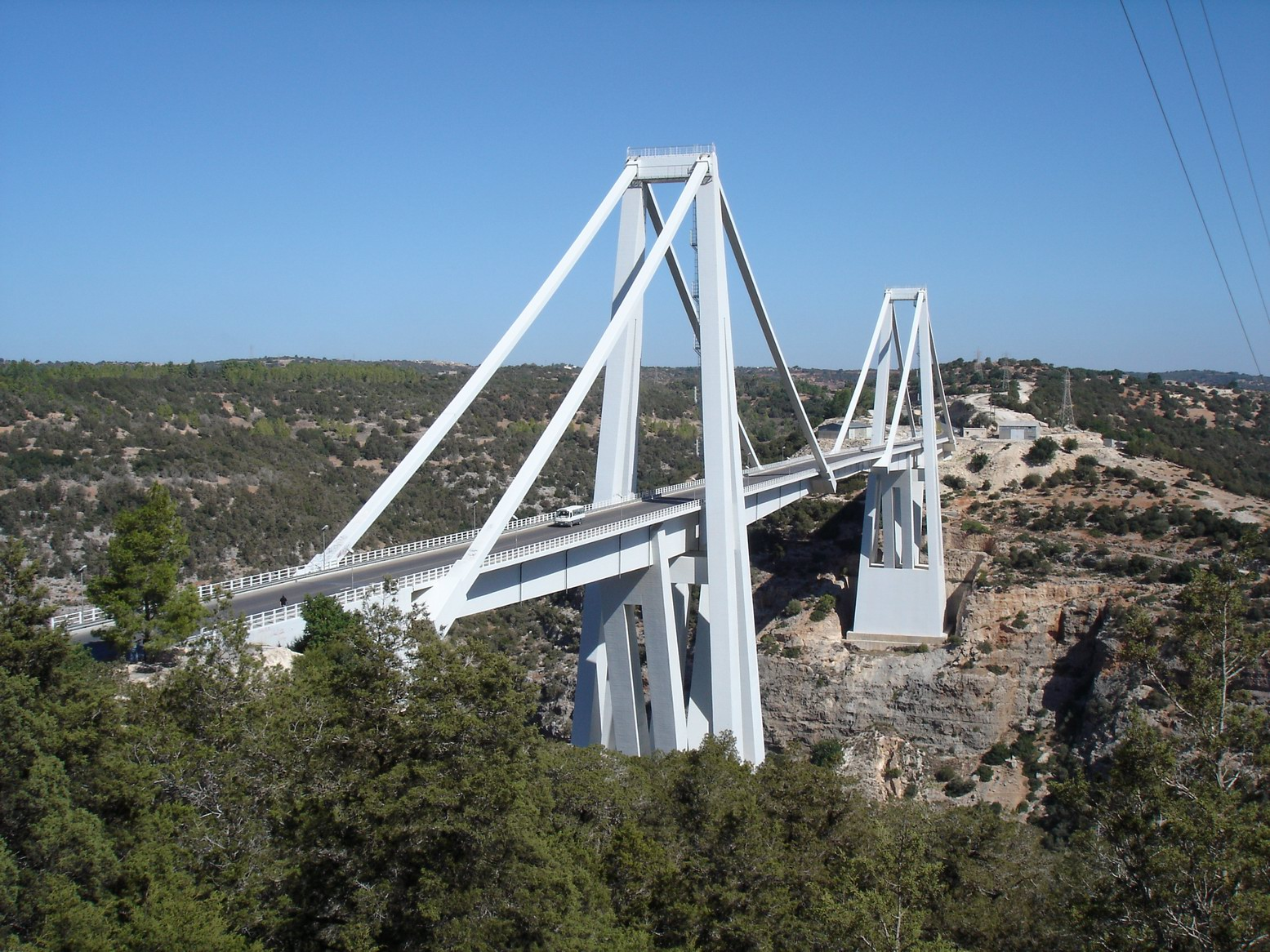
Wadi el Kuf Bridge, 1972 Bayda, Libya (2004 photo)

Morandi was born in Rome. After his graduation in 1927, Morandi gained experience in Calabria working with reinforced concrete in earthquake-damaged areas. On his return to Rome to open his own office, he continued with his technical exploration of reinforced and prestressed concrete structures and embarked on the design of a series of novel cinema structures and bridges.
His numerous later works include his work on the Fiumicino Airport (Rome) in 1970.

Morandi was appointed professor of bridge design both at the University of Florence and the University of Rome, became a Fellow of the "Royal Society for the Encouragement of Arts, Manufactures and Commerce" (FRSA) in 1963, and received an honorary doctorate in architecture by Technical University of Munich (T.U.M.) in 1979.

== Criticism of the cable-stayed bridges by Morandi ==
Morandi's cable-stayed bridges are characterised by very few stays, often as few as two per span, and often with the spans constructed from prestressed concrete rather than the more-usual steel.

Although these bridges are often impressive, they are less economic than bridges with multiple stays and have therefore been of little influence on other engineers. Bridges by Morandi have proved to require extensive maintenance and repairs over the years to pass bridge safety inspections, and cables embedded in concrete are difficult to inspect.

On his General Rafael Urdaneta Bridge in Venezuela - where the cables of the stays are not covered with prestressed concrete (as instead intended from the initial project, and optimal for Morandi) - several exposed cables snapped from rapid corrosion, and all the stay-cables were replaced just 18 years after construction.

About Ponte Morandi in Genoa (Polcevera Viaduct), since the 1970s Morandi himself had signaled and requested attention to the incorrect structural response of his bridge in Genoa, with the related safety risks, mentioning an unexpectedly fast corrosion as a possible reason for the problems, and has called for corrective works.

In 2016 Ponte Morandi had been described by Antonio Brencich as a "failure of engineering", with escalating maintenance costs to keep it safe. Pier number 9 of the bridge collapsed on 14 August 2018, causing 43 fatalities. The other two stayed-piers remained standing, as did the other eight non-stayed piers. The cause of the collapse was still under investigation more than two years later.

Morandi's similar but smaller Wadi el Kuf Bridge, in Libya, was closed for 2 days in October 2017 for safety reasons. This was after inspections identified potential fractures in the bridge. After the alert, road transport engineers inspected the bridge concluding that it needed only emergency maintenance and was safe. It was open again for light traffic, while local security officials were stopping heavily-loaded trucks from crossing in groups. A similar security alert followed in August 2018.

== Projects ==
Major works (bridges only) by Morandi is shown below:

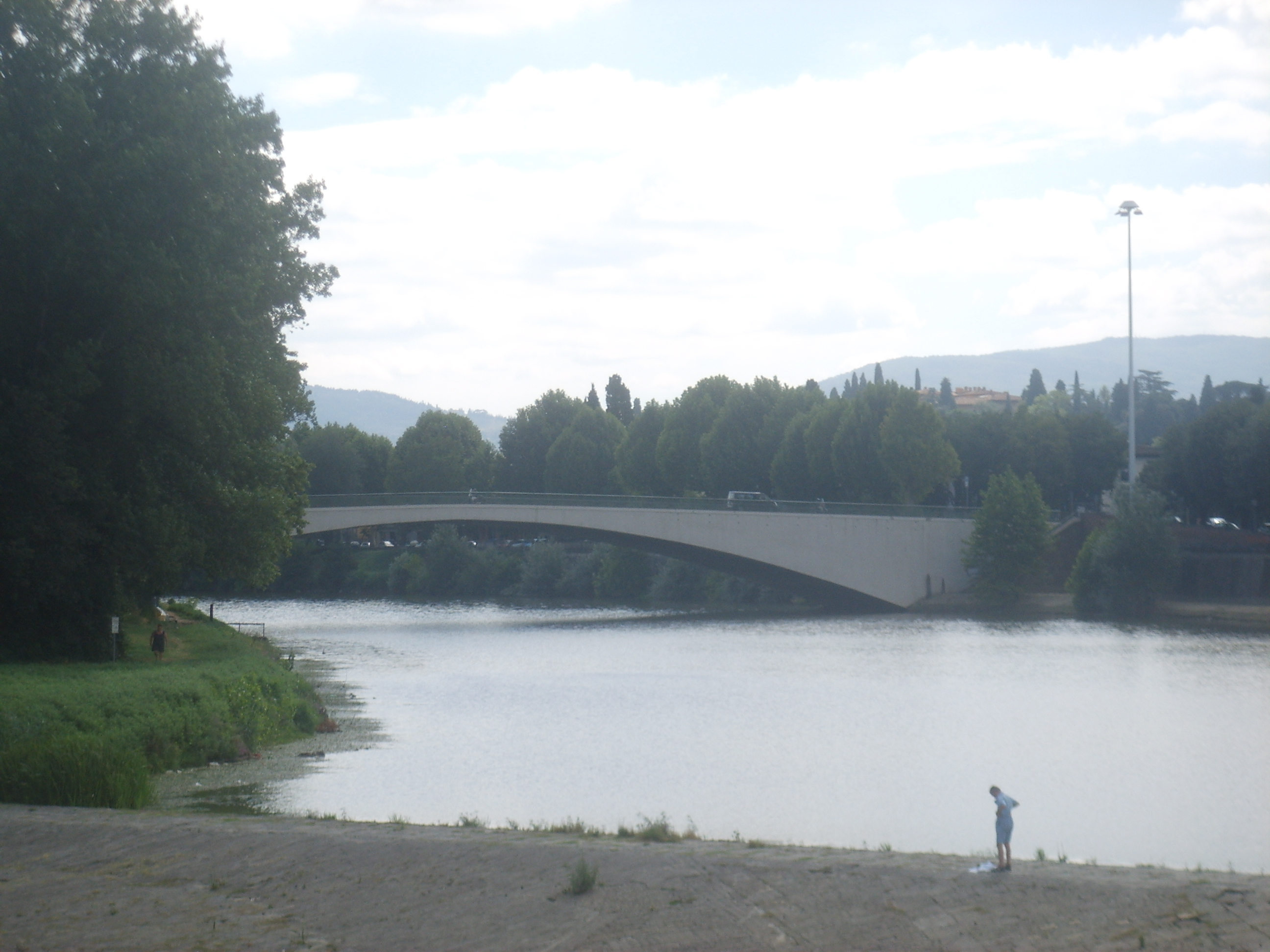
Ponte di San Niccolò
1949 - Florence, Italy

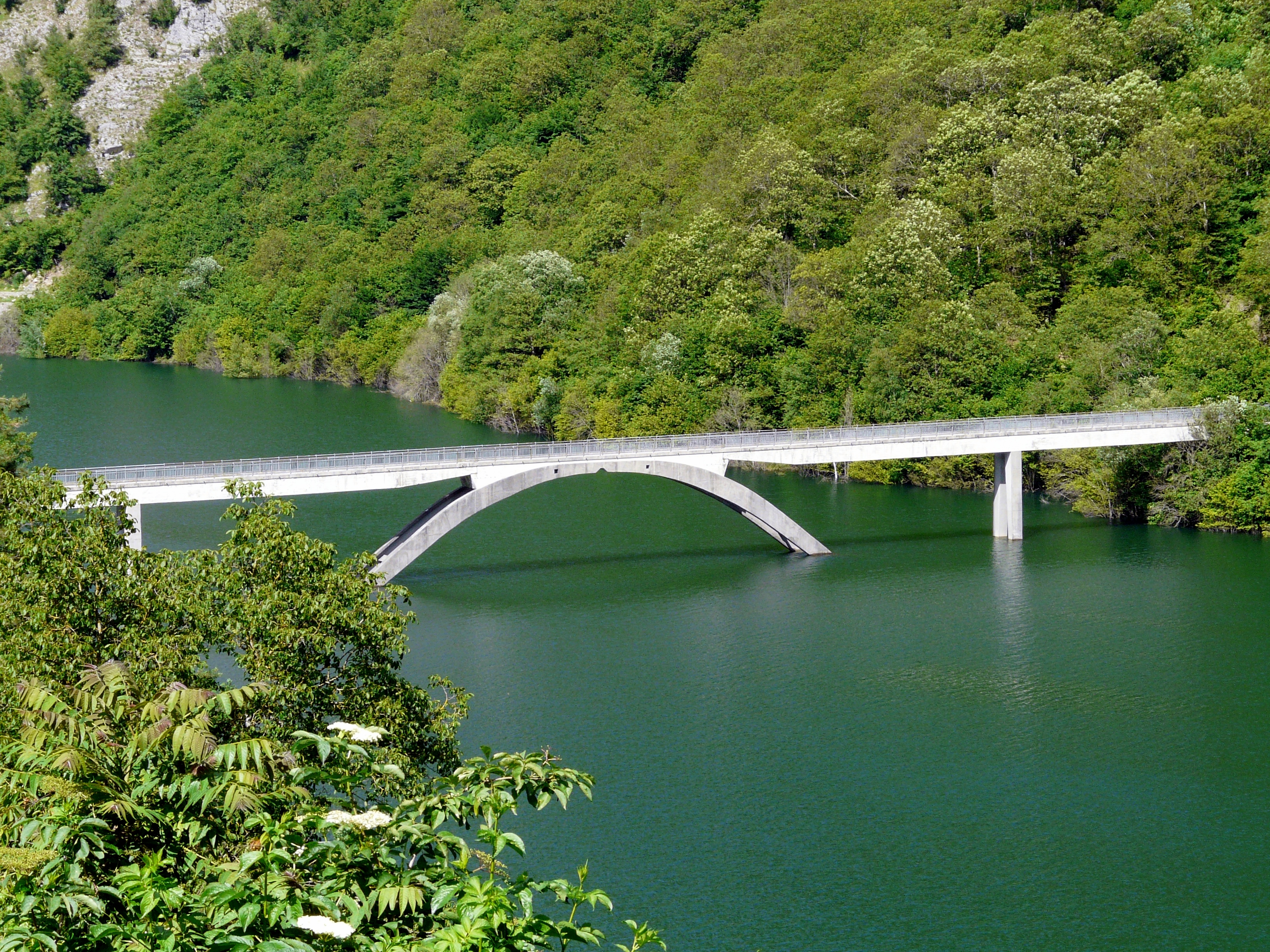
Ponte Morandi (Toscana)
1953 - Vagli Sotto, Italy

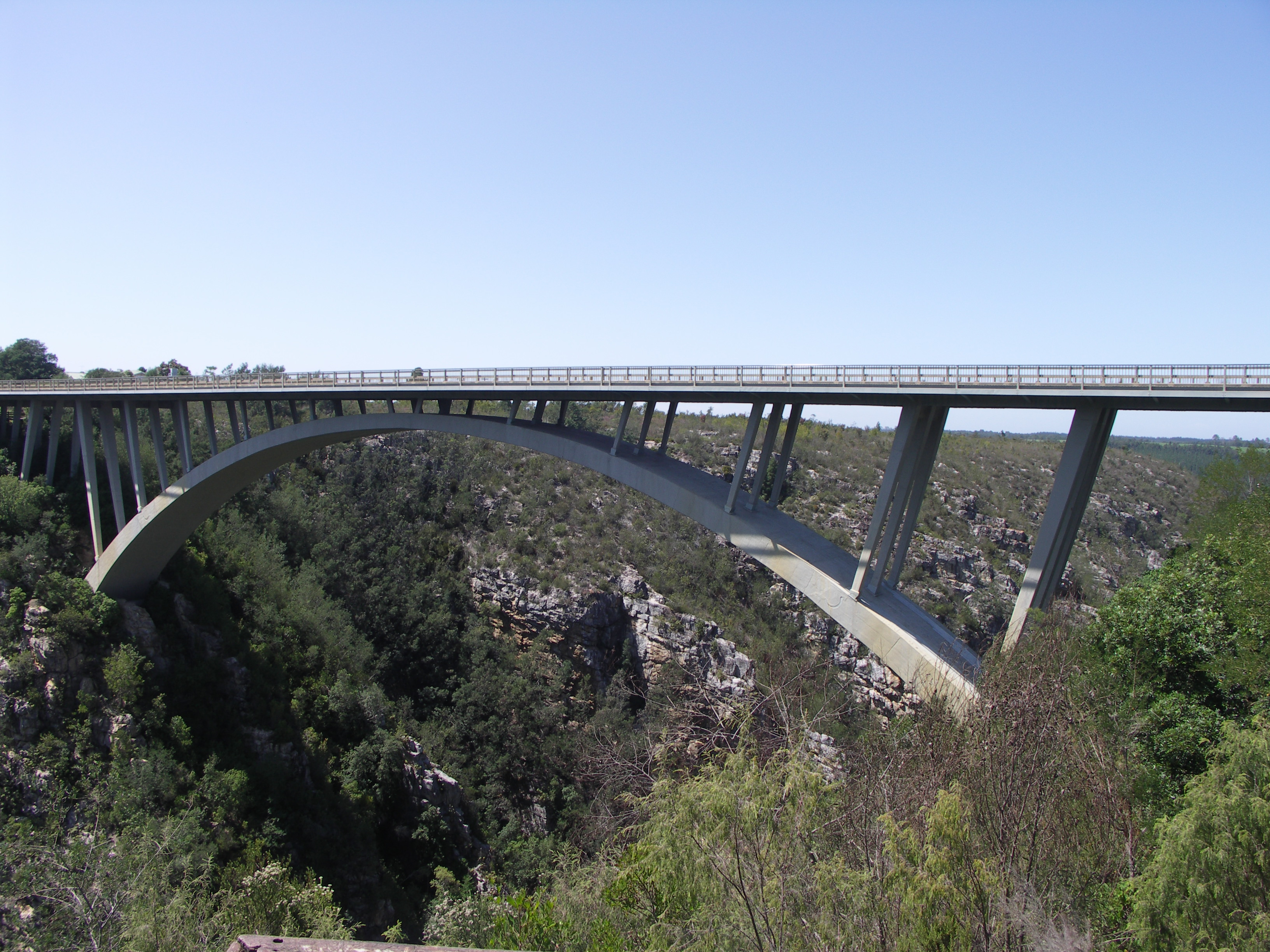
Paul Sauer Bridge
1956 - Eastern Cape, South Africa

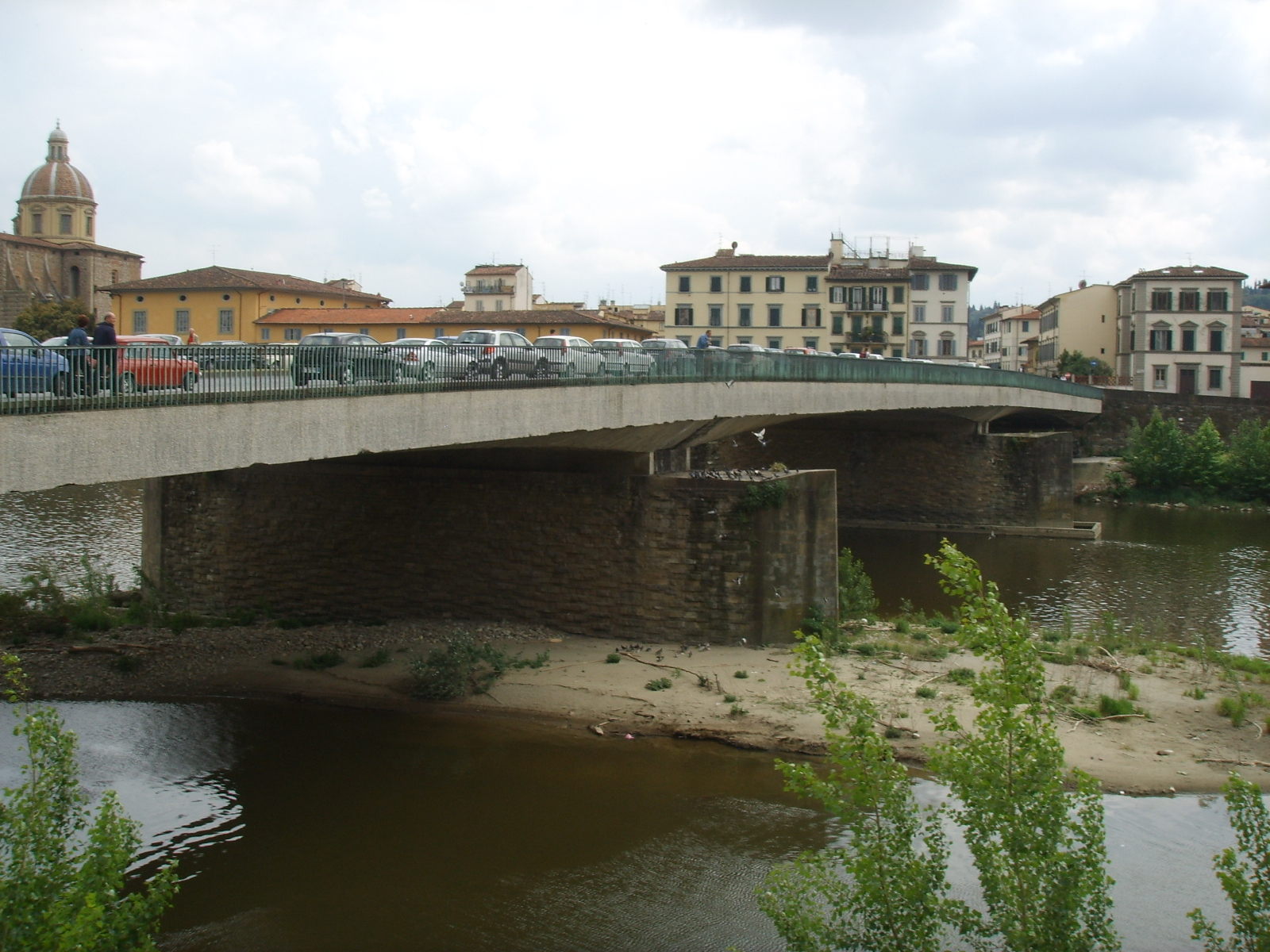
Ponte Amerigo Vespucci
1957 - Florence, Italy

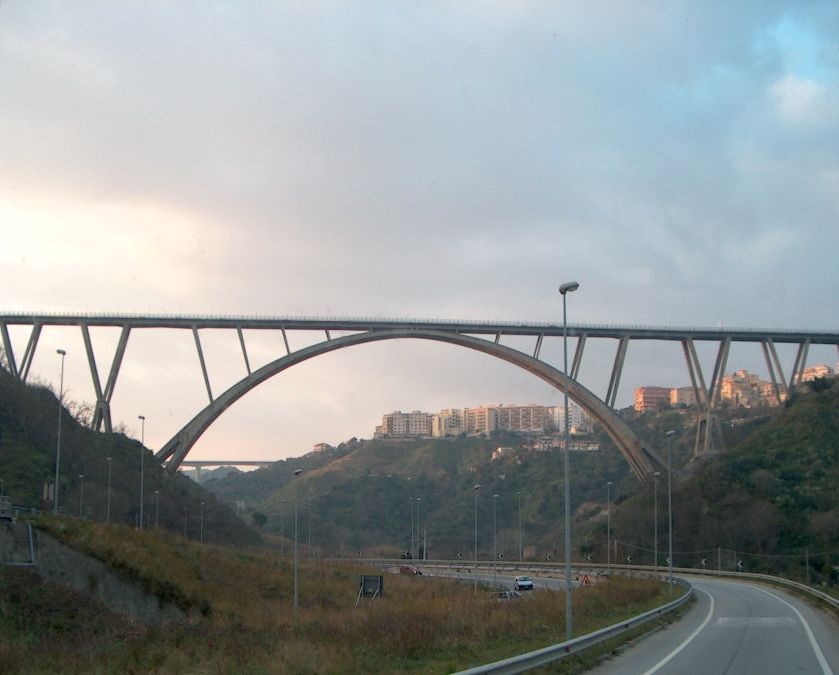
Ponte Bisantis
1960 - Catanzaro, Italy

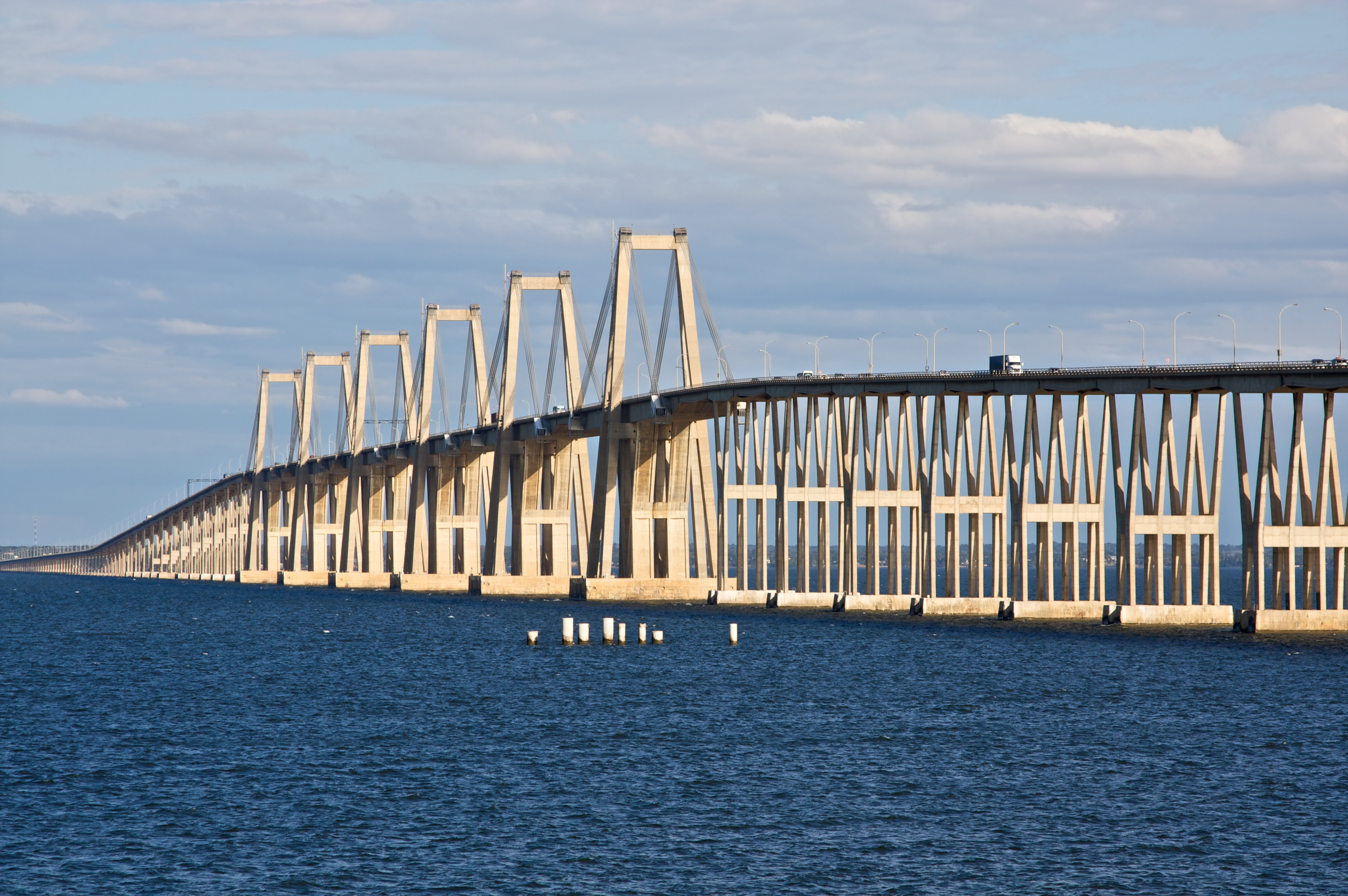
General Rafael Urdaneta Bridge
1962 - Maracaibo, Venezuela

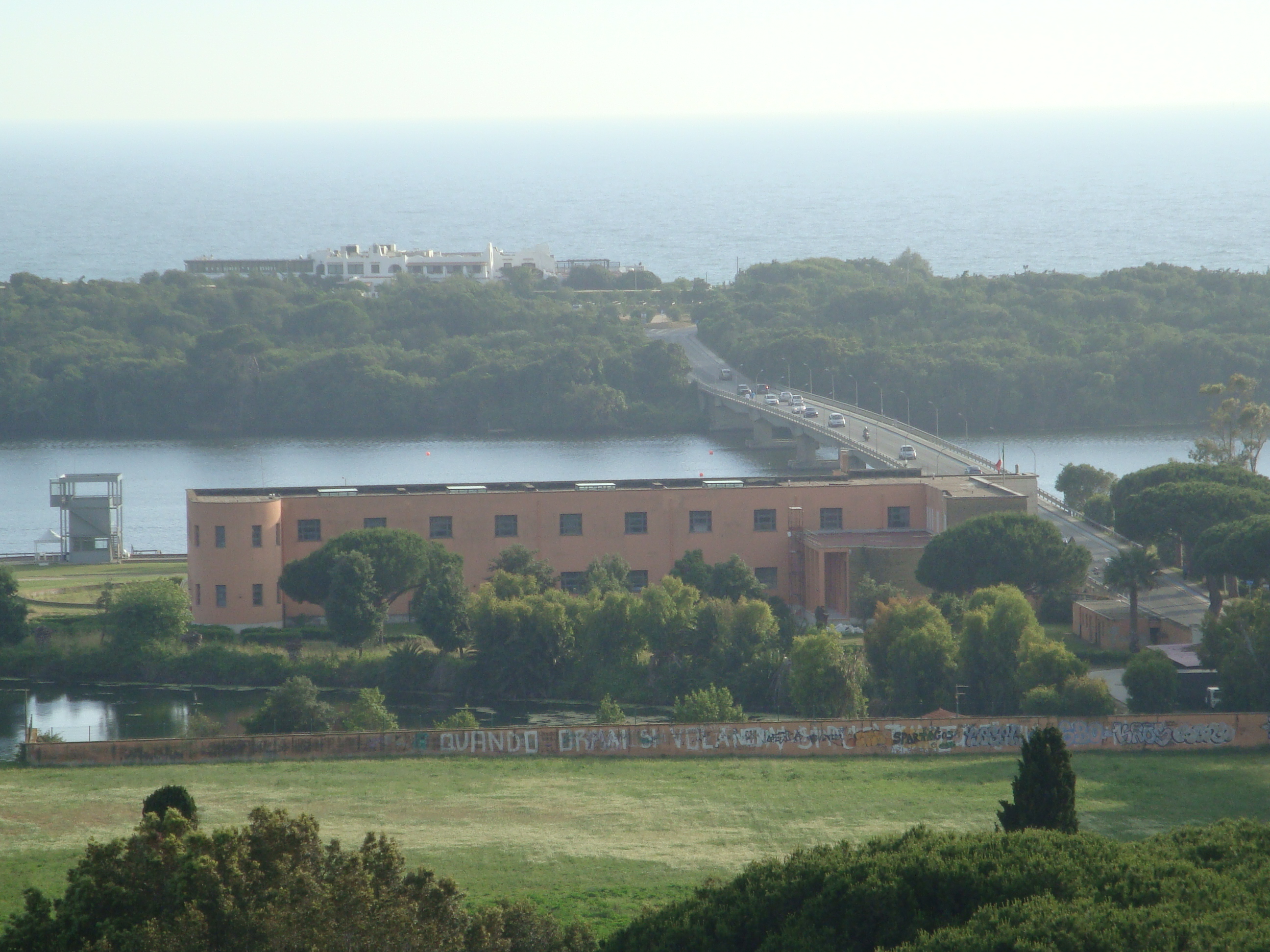
Ponte Giovanni XXIII
1964 - Sabaudia, Italy

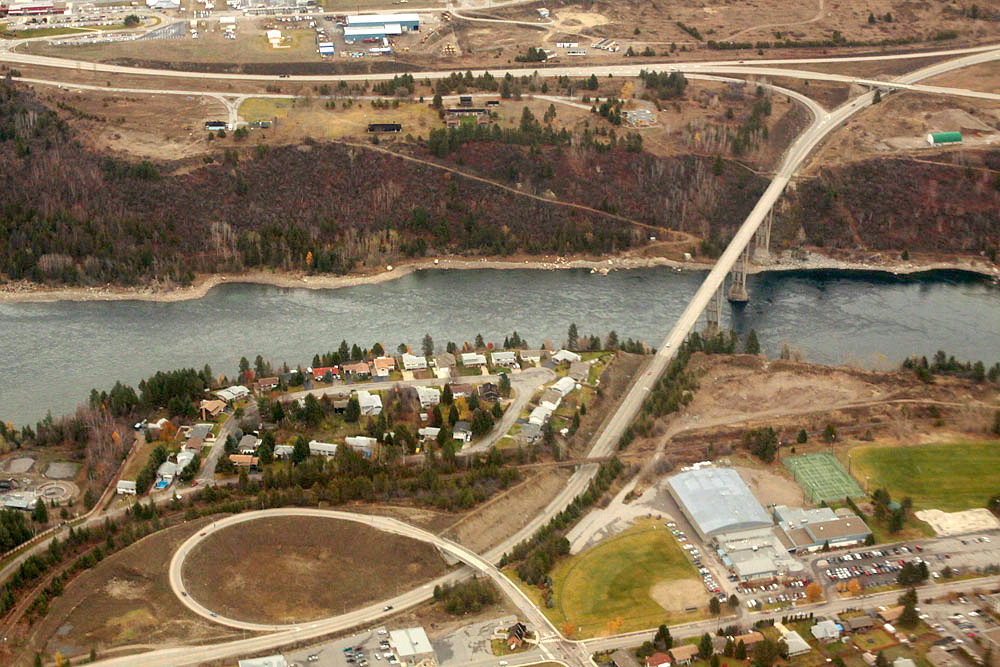
Kinnaird Bridge
1965 - Castlegar, Canada

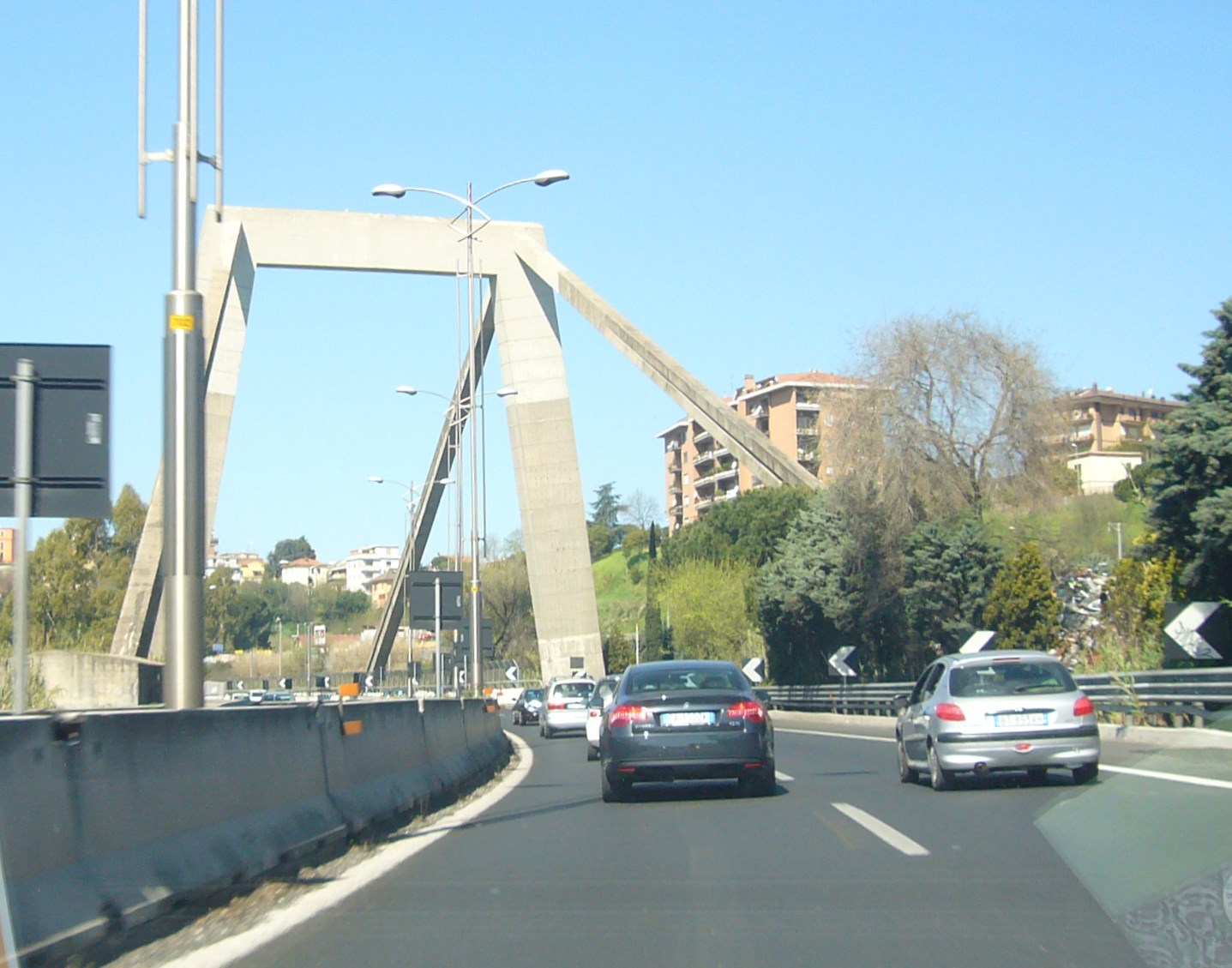
Viadotto Ansa del Tevere
1967 - Rome, Italy

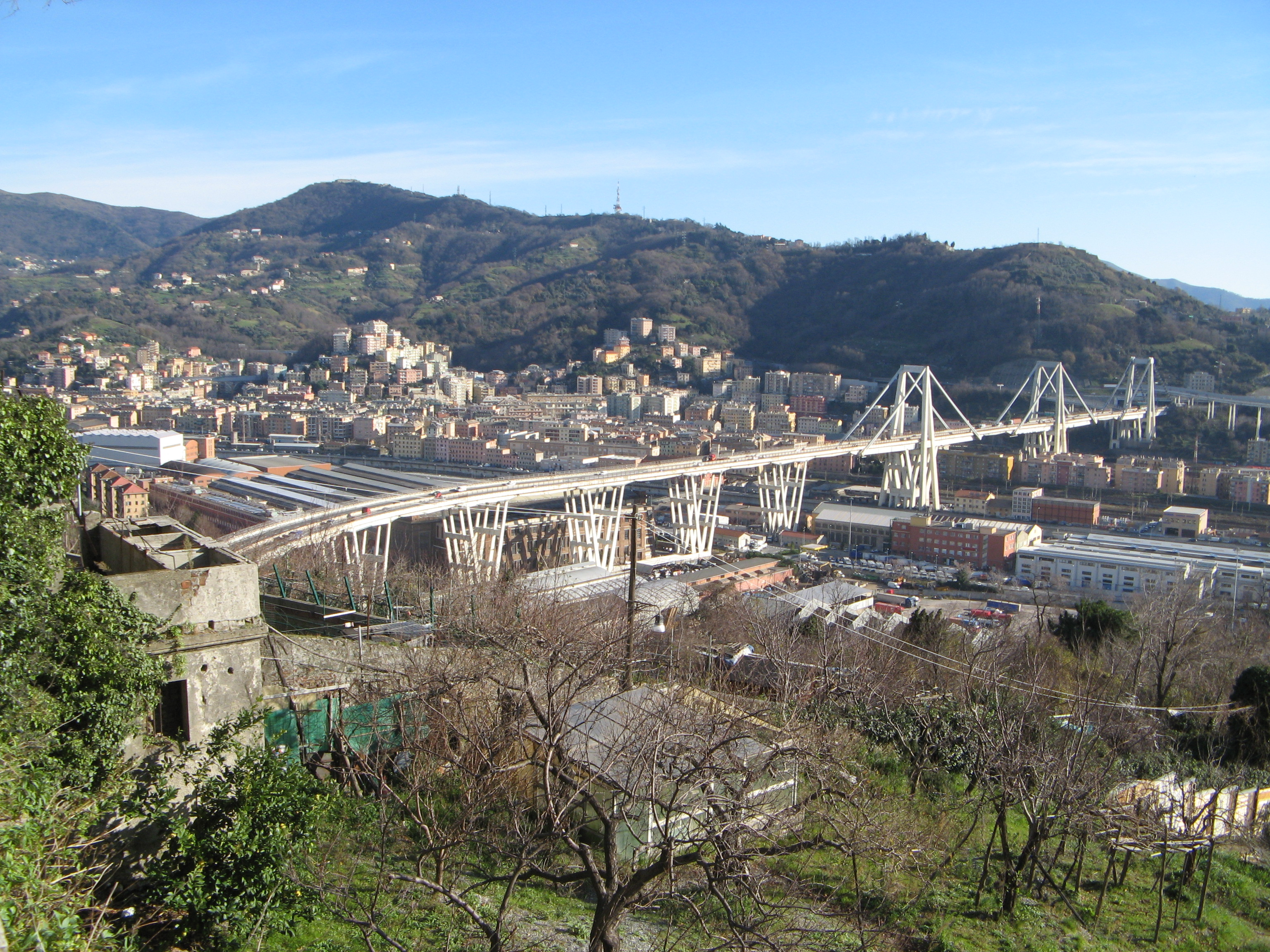
Viadotto Polcevera
1967 - Genoa, Italy

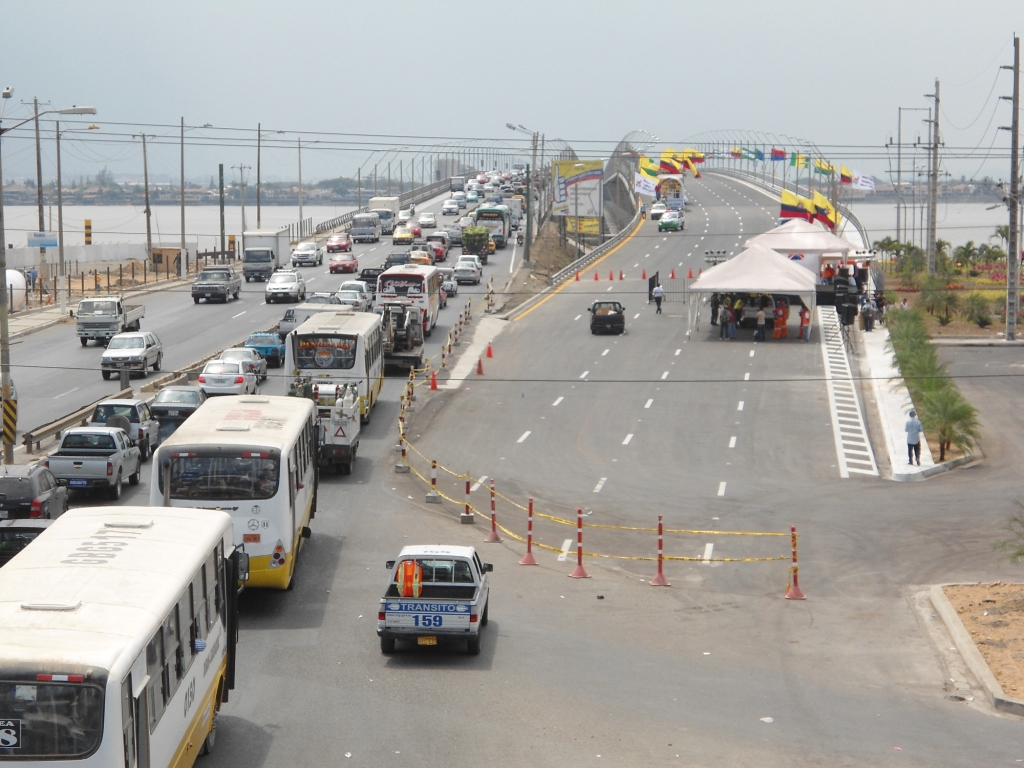
National Unity Bridge [es]
1970 - Guayaquil, Ecuador

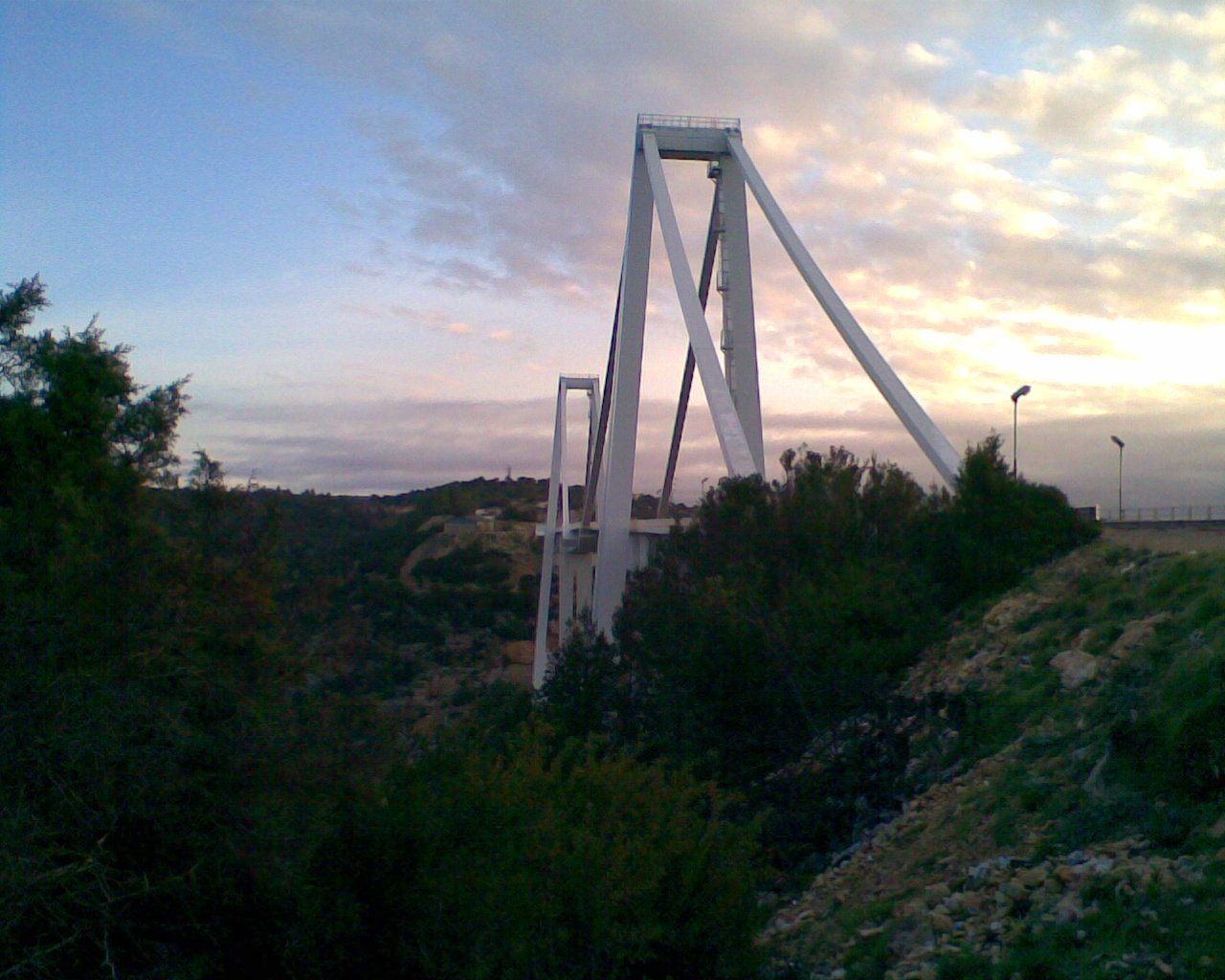
Wadi el Kuf Bridge
1971 - Bayda, Libya

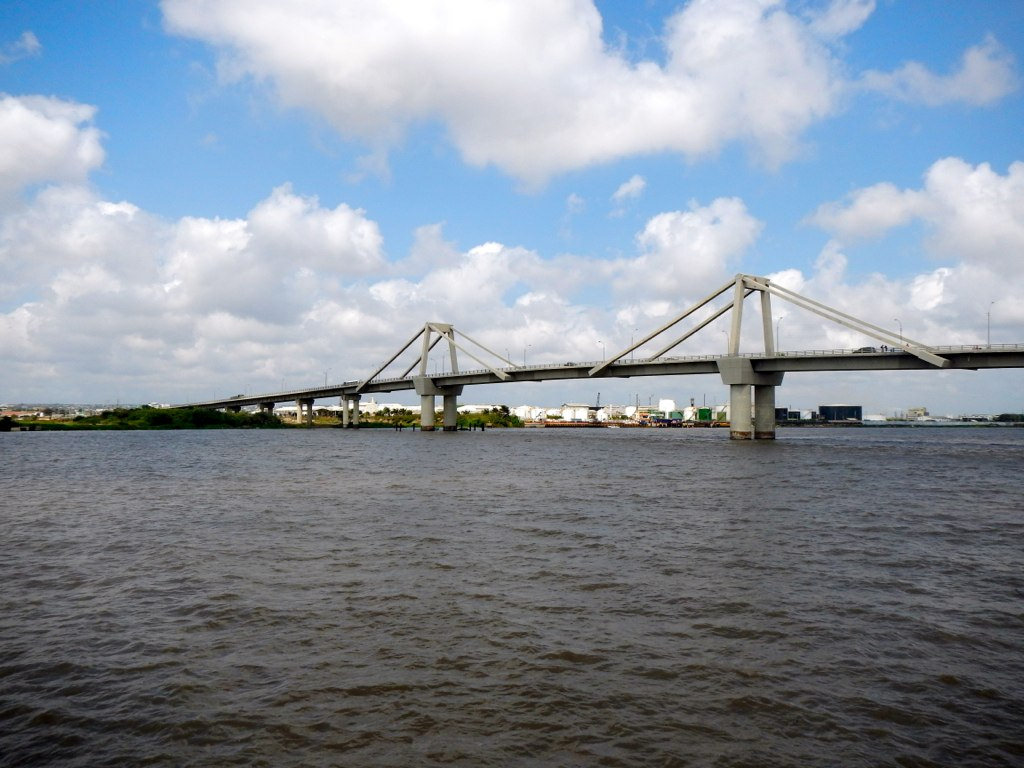
Laureano Gómez bridge
1974 - Colombia

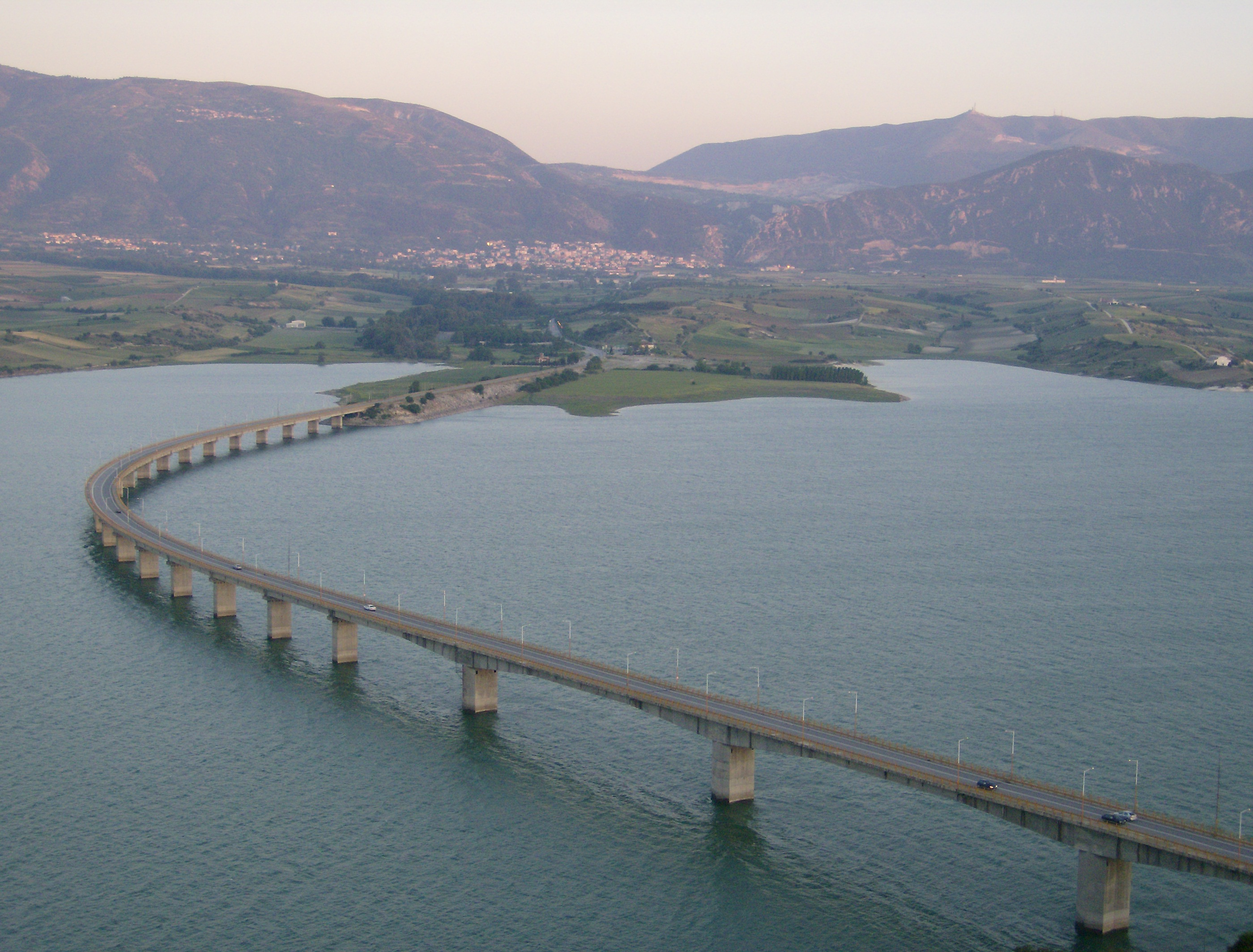
Lake Polyfytos Bridge (Servia Bridge)
1975 - Kozani, Greece

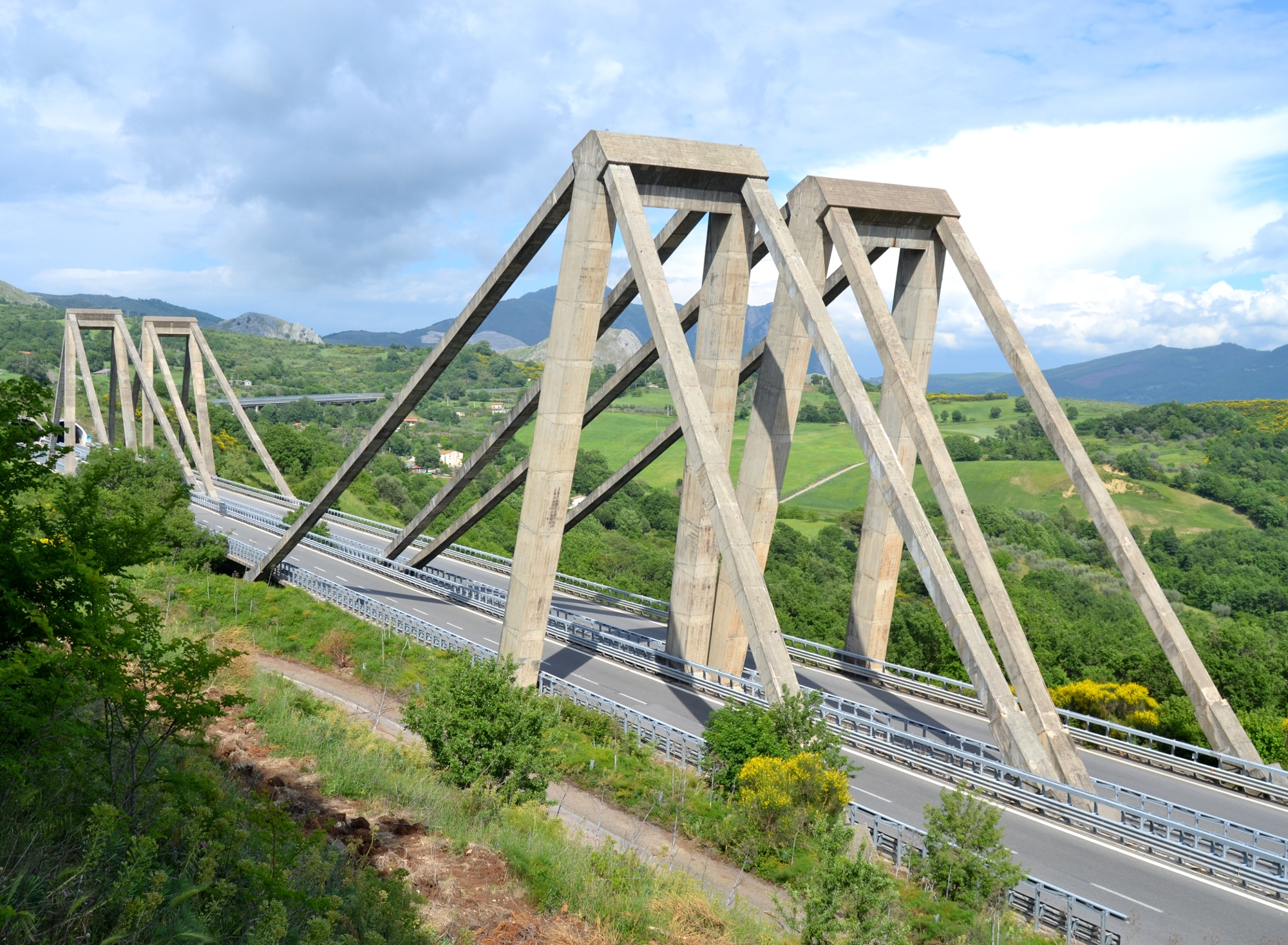
Viadotto Carpineto
1977 - Potenza, Italy

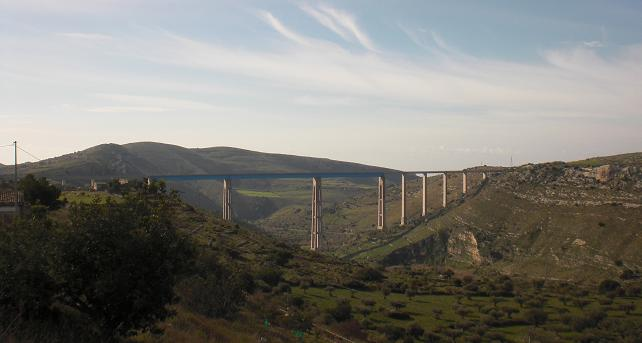
Ponte Costanzo
1984 - Ragusa, Italy

- Morandi was also involved in the construction of the Powerline crossing of Messina Strait.
