= Autostrade per l'Italia =

Italian motorway operations company

Autostrade per l'Italia S.p.A.

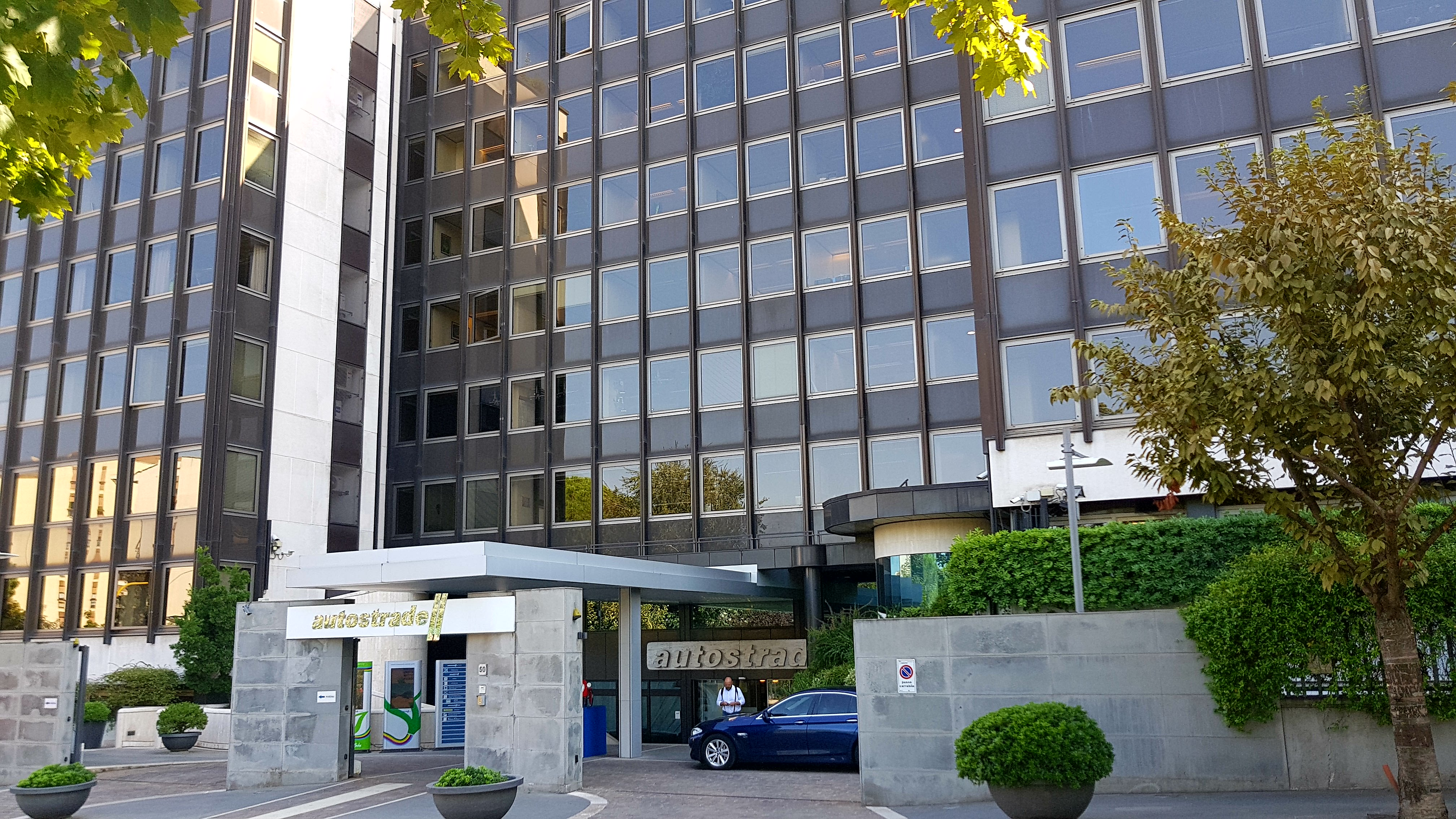
- Company headquarters
- Formerly: Autostrade S.p.A.
- Industry: Engineering and construction
- Headquarters: Rome, Italy
- Key people: Roberto Tomasi, CEO
- Number of employees: 7,335
- Parent: Holding Reti Autostradali S.p.A. (88.06%) (Cassa Depositi e Prestiti, Blackstone Infrastructure Partners, Macquarie Asset Management)
- Website: www.autostrade.it

Motorway network managed by Autostrade per l'Italia

Autostrade per l'Italia S.p.A. (formerly Autostrade S.p.A.) is an Italian joint-stock company specializing in the management of motorway sections under concession and related maintenance activities. Originally established as a state-owned enterprise under the control of the IRI, it was privatized in 1999 and restructured into its current form in 2003.

Until 2021, the company was part of the Atlantia group, which owned 88.06% of its share capital, with the Benetton family as the main shareholder.

Following the collapse of the Ponte Morandi in Genoa in August 2018, which resulted in the deaths of 43 people, the Italian government sought to assume control over the national highway network. In September 2020, a preliminary agreement was reached with Atlantia.

By spring 2021, a new company was established to which Atlantia transferred 70% of its stake in Autostrade per l'Italia (Aspi). The public bank Cassa Depositi e Prestiti injected an initial capital increase of €4 billion to cover Aspi's long-term debts and an additional €2 billion to acquire the remaining 18% stake held by Atlantia in Aspi.

As of September 2020, Atlantia owned 88% of Aspi's equity, while Edizione, the holding company of the Benetton family, held 30% of Atlantia. Autostrade per l'Italia was valued at €11 billion. In subsequent years, the Italian public sector is expected to finance extraordinary maintenance costs estimated at around €13 billion.
