= Salamanca Island Road Park =

National Park in Colombia

Vía Parque Isla de Salamanca
- Salamanca Island Road Park
- IUCN category III (natural monument or feature)
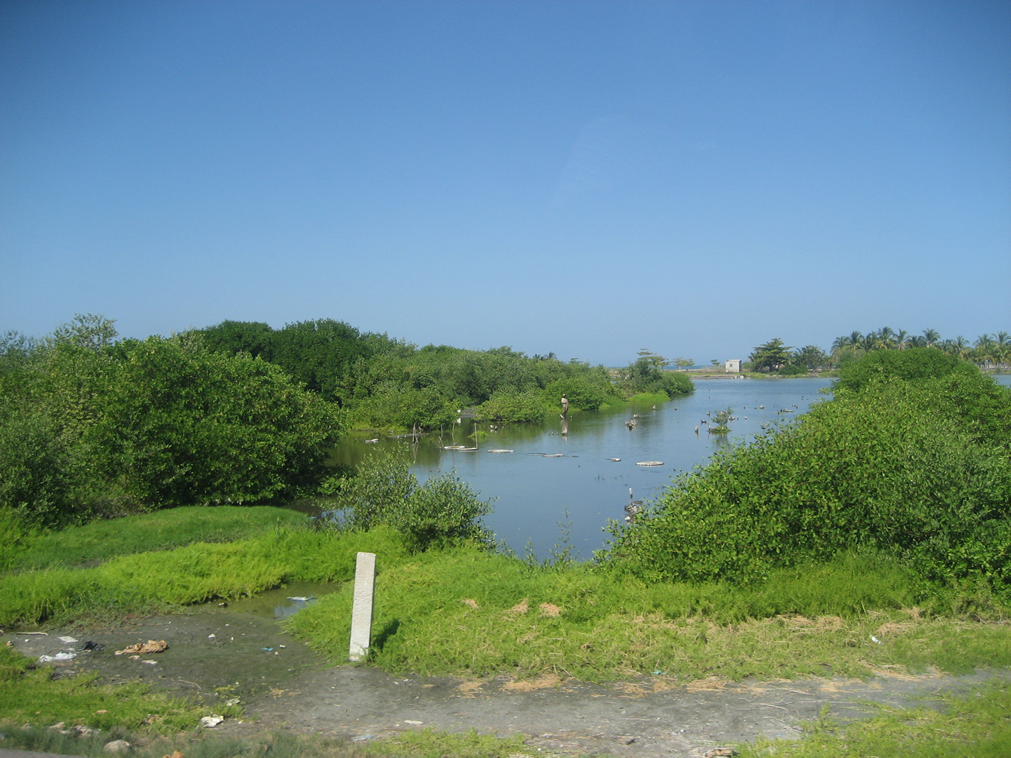
- Ciénaga Grande de Santa Marta viewed from the road park
- Interactive map of Vía Parque Isla de Salamanca
- Nearest city: Ciénaga, Colombia
- Coordinates: 10°56′N 74°27′W
- Area: 562 km^{2} (217 sq mi)
- Established: 1964
- Governing body: SINAP

The Salamanca Island Road Park (Spanish: Vía Parque Isla de Salamanca) is a national park located in the Caribbean Region of Colombia, on the western outskirts of the city of Ciénaga in the Magdalena Department. The flora and fauna is in abundance because of the confluence of sweet water flowing from the Magdalena River and saline water of the Caribbean Sea. It was created in 1964 to protect the abundant bird life and coastal mangroves.

Vía Parque is included in the Spanish name (English: Park Road) because of the road that runs through it, connecting Santa Marta with Barranquilla. In 2000 the park was designated a Biosphere reserve by UNESCO.

== Climate ==
The climate is arid and dry and the temperature averages between 28 and 30 °C. The average yearly rainfall is 400 mm in the eastern part of the area, and 760 mm in the western part. The volume of water lost through evaporation and plant transpiration is greater than rainfall, leading to a water deficit.

== Flora and fauna ==
Mangrove forests, tropical dry forests and riparian forest cover most of the area. The mangroves cover a third of the area (12,000 hectares) and the three predominant species are: red mangrove, black mangrove, white mangrove and buttonwood.

The park has an abundant variety of wildlife, many of them endangered. The existence of 33 species of mammals indicates a maintained high diversity, despite the environmental problems affecting the ecosystem. The park is home to 98 species of invertebrates, nine species of amphibians, 35 species of reptiles, more than 140 fish species and 199 birds, many of which are migratory, endemic and residents.
