= Ponte Morandi =

Road bridge in Genoa, Italy

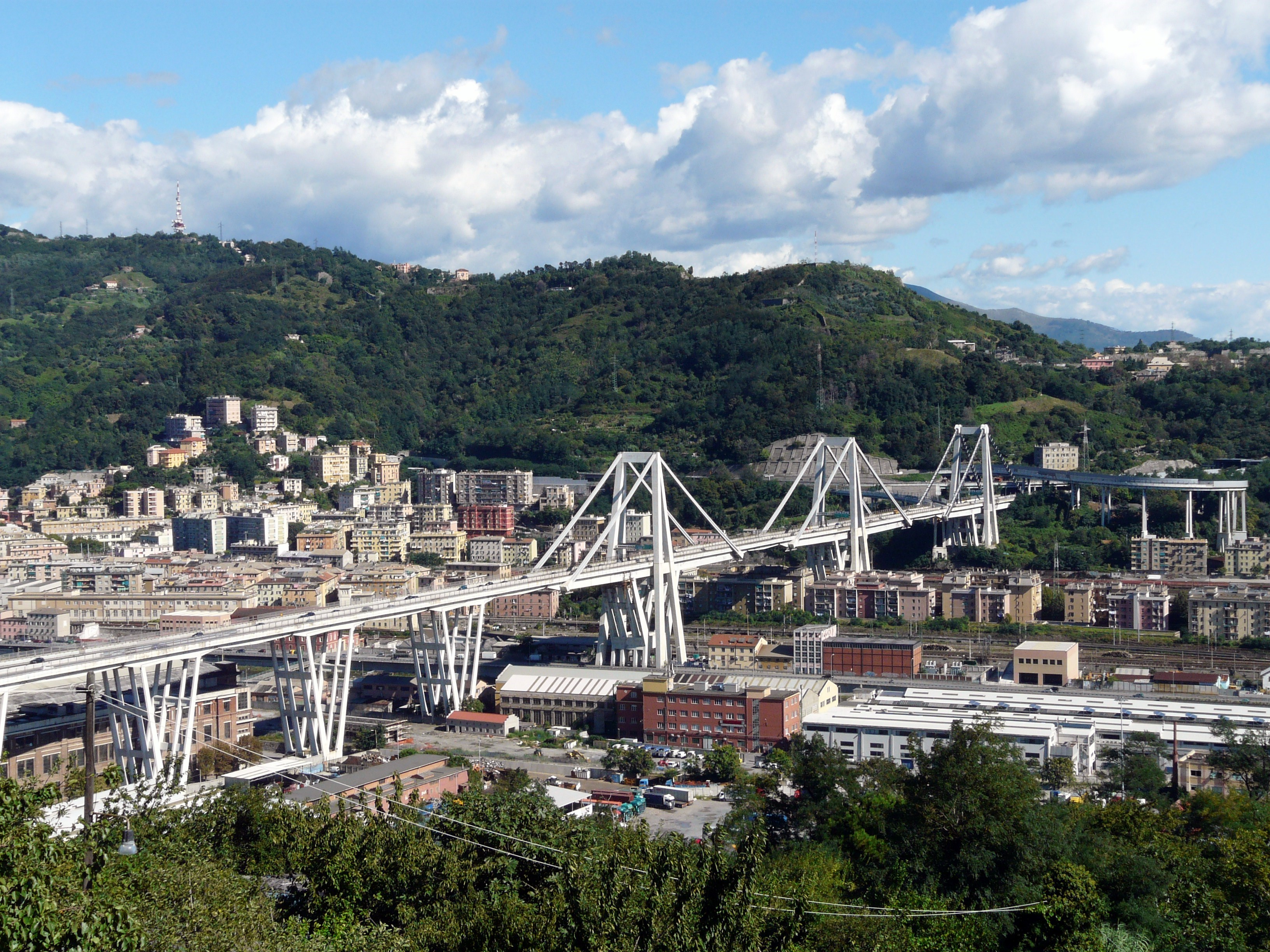
- Ponte Morandi in 2010, viewed from west
- Coordinates: 44°25′33″N 08°53′20″E
- Carried: Four lanes of roadway
- Crossed: Polcevera; Turin–Genoa railway; Milan–Genoa railway
- Locale: Genoa, Liguria, Italy
- Official name: Viadotto Polcevera

Characteristics
- Design: Cable-stayed bridge
- Total length: 1,182 metres (3,878 ft)
- Height: Piers 90.5 metres (297 ft), Road Deck 45 metres (148 ft)
- Longest span: 210 metres (690 ft)
- Clearance above: 40 metres (130 ft)

History
- Designer: Riccardo Morandi
- Construction start: 1963
- Construction end: 1967
- Opened: 4 September 1967
- Collapsed: 14 August 2018
- Destroyed: 28 June 2019
- Replaced by: Genoa-Saint George Bridge

Location
- Interactive map of Ponte Morandi

Ponte Morandi (English: Morandi Bridge), officially Viadotto Polcevera (English: Polcevera Viaduct), was a road viaduct in Genoa, Liguria, Italy, constructed between 1963 and 1967 along the A10 motorway over the Polcevera River, from which it derived its official name. It connected Genoa's Sampierdarena and Cornigliano districts across the Polcevera Valley. The bridge was widely called "Ponte Morandi" after its structural designer, engineer Riccardo Morandi.

On 14 August 2018, a 210-metre (690 ft) section of the viaduct collapsed during a rainstorm, resulting in the deaths of 43 people. The collapse led to a year-long state of emergency in the Liguria region, extensive analysis of the structural failure, and widely varying assignment of responsibility.

The remains of the original bridge were demolished in June 2019. The replacement bridge, the Genoa-Saint George Bridge was inaugurated a year later.

== History ==
=== Design ===
Ponte Morandi was designed by civil engineer Riccardo Morandi, from whom its unofficial name was derived. It was a cable-stayed bridge characterised by a prestressed concrete structure for the piers, pylons and deck, very few stays, as few as two per span, and a hybrid system for the stays constructed from steel cables with prestressed concrete shells poured on. The concrete was prestressed only to 10 MPa (1,500 psi), making it susceptible to cracks, water intrusion, and corrosion of the internal steel. The bridge was similar to Morandi's earlier 1957 design for the General Rafael Urdaneta Bridge in Venezuela except for the stays, which on the Venezuelan bridge are not covered with prestressed concrete.

=== Construction ===
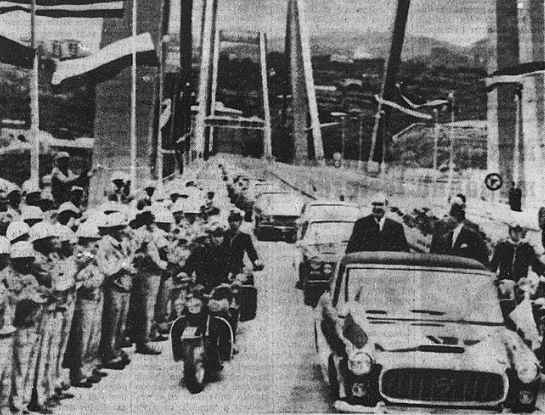
President Giuseppe Saragat at the inauguration, on 4 September 1967

The viaduct was built between 1963 and 1967 by the Società Italiana per Condotte d'Acqua, costing 3.8 billion Italian lire and opened on 4 September 1967. It had a length of 1,182 metres (3,878 ft), a height above the valley of 45 metres (148 ft) at road level, and three reinforced concrete pylons reaching 90 metres (300 ft) in height; the maximum span was 210 metres (690 ft). It featured diagonal cable stays, with three vertical trestle-like supports made up of sets of Vs, one (lower, more splayed) set carrying the roadway deck, while the other, taller pair of inverted Vs supported the top ends of two pairs of diagonal stay cables.

The viaduct was officially opened on 4 September 1967 in the presence of Italian President Giuseppe Saragat.

=== Maintenance and strengthening ===
The bridge had been subject to continual restoration work from the 1970s due to an incorrect initial assessment of the effects of creep of the concrete. This resulted in excessive deferred displacement of the vehicle deck so that it was neither level nor flat; at the worst points, it undulated in all three dimensions. Only after continual measurement, redesign, and associated structural work was the vehicle deck considered acceptable, approaching horizontal by the mid-1980s.

In a 1979 report, Morandi himself said "I think [sic] that sooner or later, maybe in a few years, it will be necessary to resort to a treatment consisting of the removal of all traces of rust on the exposure of the reinforcements, to fill the patches, with epoxidic style resins, and finally to cover everything up with elastomers of very high chemical resistance".

In the 1990s, the tendons (the steel wires, cables, and threaded bars, designed to produce the bridge's prestressed concrete) on pillar 11 appeared to be most damaged. About 30% of the tendons had corroded away. The load of the bridge was 7,000 kg (15,000 lb) per tendon, whereas the tendons were originally capable of carrying 15,000 kg (33,000 lb). A single truck can weigh as much as 44,000 kg (97,000 lb). As of the collapse of the bridge, only pillar 11 had been internally inspected in the 1990s, showing severed and oxidized strands. From 1990 onward, the easternmost pillar 11 had its stays strengthened by flanking them with external steel cables. Pillar 10 had the stays at the top strengthened with steel sheathing in the 1990s. Following the collapse, many questions have been raised about the stays. Morandi's similar bridge in Venezuela suffered one or more stay cable failures in 1979/1980, with collapse imminent.

The minister of infrastructures and transport in charge until 1 June 2018, Graziano Delrio, was informed multiple times in the Italian parliament during 2016 that the Morandi bridge needed maintenance.

In 2017, a confidential university report in Genoa noted severe disparities in the behaviour of the stays of the pillar 9, which would collapse. The minutes of a February 2018 government meeting report that resistance and reflectometry measurements indicated an "average" reduction of the cross-section of the tendons of 10 to 20%. A crack in the road had appeared at least 14 days before the collapse, near the southeastern stay of the subsequently collapsed pillar 9. The crack may have been an indication that the stay had stretched. At no point was a suggestion made to reduce the load on the bridge. Traditionally, bridges were designed for a 50-year lifespan; the bridge failed just under 51 years after its opening.

On 3 May 2018, the Autostrade company had announced a call for tenders for a structural upgrade of the viaduct to the value of €20,159,000, with a deadline of 11 June 2018. The work on the reinforcement of the stays on pillars 9 and 10 would have needed to be finished within five years.

Workers were installing new heavy concrete Jersey barriers on the Ponte Morandi before it collapsed, reducing the already low-compressive prestress on the concrete of the stays and increasing the loads.

==== 2017 modal analyses ====
In 2017, Carmelo Gentile and Antonello Ruccolo of the Polytechnic University of Milan studied the modal frequencies and deformations of the stays of the bridge. On pillar 9, they could identify only four global modes, and the deformations of two of these identified modes were not fully compliant. Modal frequencies were more than 10% different, specifically on the southern stays. In pre-stressed concrete beams, such a difference could represent the entire effect of the non-linear pre-stresses. As little as a 2% shift could represent severe damage. The prestress in the Ponte Morandi was characterised as relatively small from the start. In contrast, with bare tendons, which are relatively under-constrained like the strings in a piano, the effect of prestress is dominant in determining the resonant frequency. Other than prestress, changes in geometry, such as corrosion in the tendons, could impact the resonant frequency. The effects would be reduced by the composite nature of the stays when observing global modes. Gentile had performed similar modal analyses on pillar 11 in the 1990s. Other related methods were applied on the stays of Ponte Morandi in the 1990s, such as reflectometry, which was able to measure the tension, but not strength of the tendons.

=== Replacement proposals ===
By the mid-2000s, the A10 route through Genoa and over the bridge had become highly congested. The city council requested proposals for improvement of traffic flow through Genoa, with the Autostrade company in 2009 proposing the "Gronda di Ponente" project to improve flow, by moving traffic to a newly built Autostrada interchange system located to the north of the city. As part of the initial study and report, the Autostrade company measured that the bridge carried 25.5 million transits a year, with traffic having quadrupled in the previous 30 years and "destined to grow, even in the absence of intervention, by a further 30% in the next 30 years".

The study highlighted how the traffic volume, with daily queues at peak hours joining the Autostrada Serravalle, produced "an intense degradation of the bridge structure subjected to considerable stress", with the need for continuous maintenance. The study showed that, in the option for improving what was termed as the "low gutter", it would be more economical to replace the bridge with a new one north of its current location, and then to demolish the existing bridge.

=== Collapse ===
On 14 August 2018, around 11:36 local time (09:36 UTC), during a torrential rainstorm, the span around pillar 9 of the Ponte Morandi collapsed and the vehicles on it fell into the Polcevera river. Forty-three people were confirmed dead and 16 injured. The disaster caused a major political controversy about the poor state of infrastructure in Italy and raised wider questions about the condition of bridges across Europe. It was later decided that the bridge would not be repaired, but demolished. Demolition began in February 2019 and was completed on 28 June 2019.

== Replacement ==
Construction on the replacement began on 25 June 2019, and it was completed in the spring of 2020. The Genoa-Saint George Bridge was inaugurated on 3 August 2020.

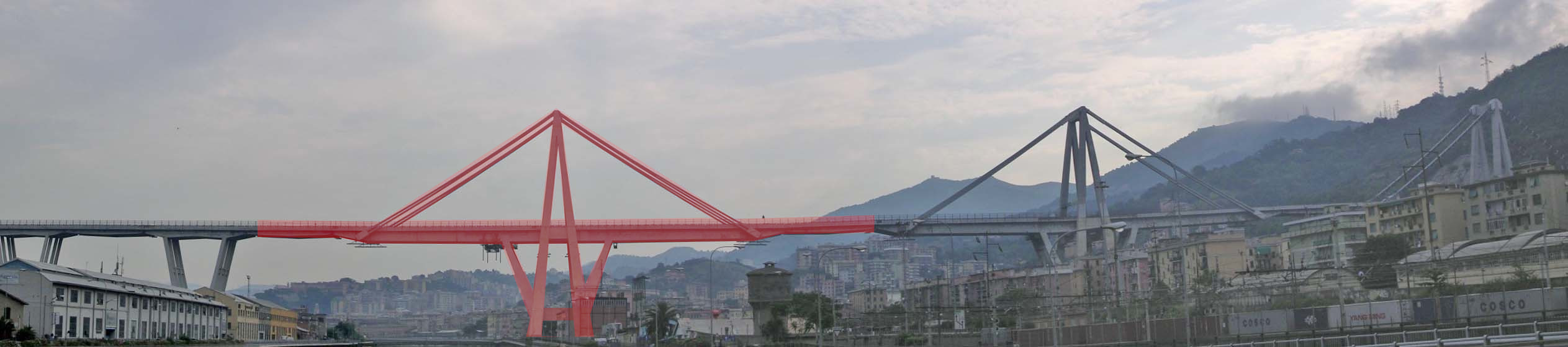
The collapsed part of the bridge is shown in red.
