= Rocco Benetton =

Italian businessman (born 1969)

- Born: 29 September 1969 (age 57); Treviso, Veneto, Italy
- Education: Boston University
- Occupations: Mechanical engineer, hedge fund and private banking professional, F1 and business executive
- Relatives: Luciano Benetton (father); Giuliana Benetton (aunt); Carlo Benetton (uncle); Gilberto Benetton (uncle)

Rocco Benetton (born 29 September 1969) is an Italian entrepreneur publicly known for his role as chief executive officer of championship-winning Formula One Team Benetton.

== Personal background ==
He is the son of Maria Teresa and Luciano Benetton and member of the Italian Benetton family which founded the Benetton Group S.p.A. clothing company in 1965. He is married and the father of three children.

== Academic career ==
After attending high school in his home town of Treviso, he moved to the United States to study mechanical engineering at Boston University in 1989. As of December 2025, he is a member of the Boston University College of Engineering Dean's Leadership Advisory Board.

== Career in Wall Street ==
At the end of his studies, Benetton moved to New York City at the beginning of 1994 where he worked in Wall Street for Oppenheimer & Co. and Alpha Investment Management as a hedge fund specialist and later served as managing director.

== Career in F1 ==
In 1997, Benetton moved back to Europe and became commercial director of Benetton Formula One, the team racing in the World Formula One Championship, following the departure of chief executive Flavio Briatore. The following year he was made chief executive, succeeding David Richards. He led the team for four years, achieving good results. The team, however, was not able to keep up with the financial investment level of the newcomer car manufacturers, so Benetton directed and managed the sale of the BF1 Team to Renault Group for at the time a record agreement in 2000 including the following co-branding exposure for two more F1 seasons.

== Entrepreneurial career ==
After working in England, Benetton returned to Treviso. He founded Zero Rh+ and Oot Group, which was associated with WPP plc.

In 2003, he also founded Banca del Gottardo Italia, personally acquired a 4% stake in the bank and joined the board together with Alberto Bombasei (Brembo SpA), Domenico Bosatelli (Gewiss SpA) and Tito Lombardini (Gruppo Lombardini). After a very successful development of the business, Banca del Gottardo was acquired in totality by Banca Generali in May 2008.

In 2013, Benetton founded Mobisec Group, a company specialising in application security and the Internet of Things. The company was established with professionals previously associated with Etnoteam, Value Partners, Value Team, Sun Microsystems and IBM.[1] Following five years of research and development, Mobisec began offering its services to businesses in Italy. The company subsequently expanded its operations, establishing a US presence in Menlo Park, California, in 2020.[2]

Benetton has invested in start-up companies in Europe, Asia and the United States.
