= Benetton =

Benetton may refer to:

- Benetton Group, an Italian clothing retailer
- Benetton family, the family who were responsible for the brand's creation
- Benetton Formula, a Formula One constructor which became Renault F1 in 2002
- Benetton Rugby, an Italian rugby union club
- Pallacanestro Treviso, a basketball club often referred to as Benetton Basket
