= Alessandro Benetton =

Italian businessman

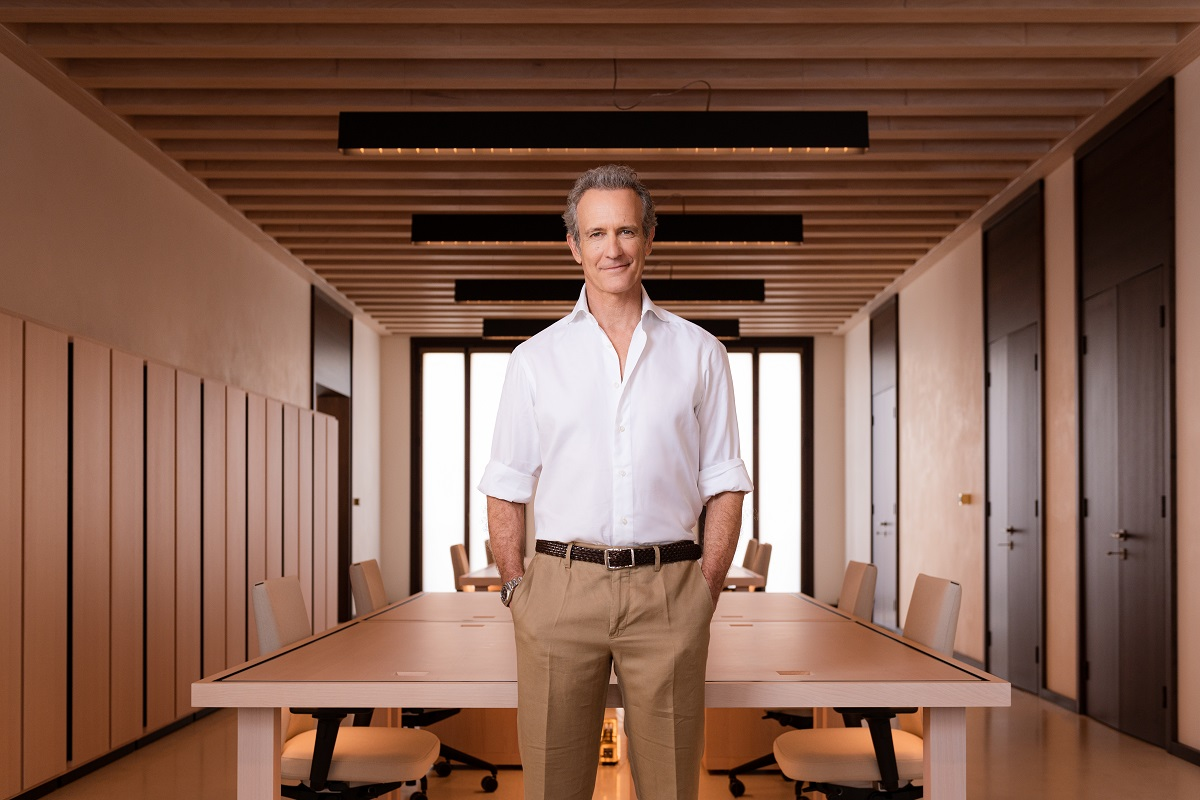
- Alessandro Benetton
- Born: 2 March 1964 (age 62); Treviso, Veneto, Italy
- Education: Boston University; Harvard University
- Occupation: businessman
- Employers: 21 Investimenti S.p.A.; Benetton Formula
- Known for: Founder and Chairman of 21 Invest
- Spouse: Deborah Compagnoni (m. 2008; sep. 2021)
- Children: 3
- Relatives: Luciano Benetton (father); Rocco Benetton (brother); Giuliana Benetton (aunt); Carlo Benetton (uncle); Gilberto Benetton (uncle)
- Family: Benetton family

Alessandro Benetton (born 2 March 1964) is an Italian businessman.

== Early life ==
Alessandro Benetton is the son of Luciano Benetton and Maria Teresa Maestri. He attended university in the United States where he graduated from Boston University in 1987 with a degree in Business Administration and in 1991 received his Master of Business Administration from Harvard.

== Career ==
In 1992, Alessandro Benetton created 21 Investimenti S.p.A. (the company changed its name in 21 invest in November 2018). 21 Invest, a European group now part of the 21 Next Group, invests in mid-market companies in Italy, France, and Spain, with more than 120 investments and nearly €3 billion fundraising from institutional investors worldwide over the last 33 years of activity. He is one of the pioneers of private equity in Italy.

Benetton served as Chairman of the Benetton Formula from 1988 to 1998. His chairmanship years were marked by Formula One victories (26 out of the team's total 27), including two world titles won with Michael Schumacher in 1994 and 1995, a manufacturing victory in 1995, and a collaboration with Nelson Piquet, Jean Alesi, Riccardo Patrese, Alessandro Nannini.

From 1988 to 1989, he was the first Italian to work in the Global Finance department at Goldman Sachs International in London as an analyst in the Mergers and Acquisitions and Equity Offering sectors.

In January 2022, Alessandro Benetton took on the role of Chairman of Edizione, which became an S.p.A. company. He is currently also the Honorary Chairman of Avolta, the new unified brand born through the subsequent integration agreement between Autogrill and Dufry.

In May 2022, he published "La Traiettoria", an autobiography about his professional career and the choices he made during his life. His second book “Mai Fermi”, published in June 2025, tells the stories of eight mentors that inspired Alessandro Benetton’s approach to life and business: Michael Schumacher, Andy Warhol, Amadeo Giannini, Kelly Slater, Bethany Hamilton, Tadao Ando, Emilie Floge, and his father Luciano Benetton.

In January 2023 he was appointed Vice Chairman of Mundys, a group that invests in sustainable infrastructure and includes subsidiaries such as Aeroporti di Roma, Telepass, Yunex, and Abertis. In March 2026 he was appointed Chairman of the group.

In 2026, he was appointed Chairman of 21 NEXT, a European alternative asset management platform combining 21 Invest and 21 Tages.

He is also the Founder and Chairman of the Unhate Foundation, a third-sector organization he established in 2011 and relaunched in 2025 with the support of Edizione S.p.A., Mundys, and Aeroporti di Roma. Alessandro Benetton leads its strategic direction, promoting initiatives aimed at combating hate and fostering social inclusion, with the support of a scientific committee made up primarily of individuals under the age of 30.

== Other positions held ==
He was a member of the Advisory Committee of Robert Bosch International Beteiligungen AG in Zurich, the consultancy unit of the Swiss holding for the foreign activities of the Bosch Group. He was President of Cortina Foundation 2021, the entity responsible for the organization of the FIS Alpine World Ski Championship scheduled in Cortina d'Ampezzo (BL) for January 2021. This event marked the first major sustainable event in Italy, both environmentally and economically.

== Personal life ==
Benetton married former Olympic and Alpine World Ski champion Deborah Compagnoni in 2008, with whom he has three children: Agnese, Tobias and Luce. They separated in 2021. He is involved in a variety of sports at a competitive level, particularly Alpine skiing - where he is a coach for the Italian Winter Sports Federation - and kite surfing. He is a collector of modern art.

== Honors ==
In 2010, he was appointed Cavaliere del Lavoro by the President of the Italian Republic at the time, Giorgio Napolitano.

In 2016, he received the America Award of the Italy-USA Foundation.

== Awards ==
In 2012, he created the United Colors of Benetton's UnHate communication campaign, winner of the Press Grand Prix at Cannes Lions International Festival of Creativity.

In 2011, he was named Entrepreneur of the Year by EY.

In 2018, he received the Kennedy Prize for placing sustainable development at the center of 21 Invest.

In 2023, the U.N. Correspondents Association, UNCA, awarded him as "Global Advocate of the Year 2023”.

== Publications ==
- Alessandro Benetton (2022). LA TRAIETTORIA. Mondadori. ISBN 9788804749080.
- Alessandro Benetton (2025). Mai fermi. Mondadori. ISBN 9788804802846.
