= Edizione =

Italian holding company

Edizione S.p.A.
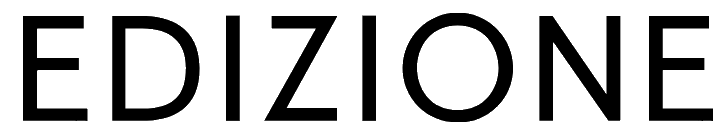
- Type: Società per azioni
- Industry: Holding company
- Founded: 1981 in Treviso, Italy
- Founder: Benetton family
- Headquarters: Treviso, Italy
- Key people: Alessandro Benetton (Chairman); Enrico Laghi (CEO)
- Services: Transport infrastructure, financial services, venture capital, digital infrastructure, food service, travel retail, real estate, agriculture, apparel, textiles, sports
- Revenue: 10.1 billion euros (2024)
- Net income: 247.3 million euros (2024)
- Owner: Benetton family
- Number of employees: 100,000+ (2025)
- Website: https://www.edizione.com/en

Edizione S.p.A. is an Italian financial holding company entirely controlled by the Benetton family. Established in 1981 as Edizione Holding S.p.A., it is headquartered in Treviso and maintains secondary offices in Milan. Throughout its history, the company has ensured legal continuity across various corporate reorganizations, transitioning to a limited liability company (S.r.l.) in 2009 before returning to its current joint-stock (S.p.A.) status in 2022.

Edizione operates as the parent company of a diversified investment portfolio across sectors including transport infrastructure, food service and travel retail, digital infrastructure, apparel and textiles, real estate and agriculture, financial services and venture capital, as well as minor activities in the sports and cultural fields.

Its principal indirect and associate holdings include: Mundys S.p.A. (formerly Atlantia), controlled through Schema Alfa and overseeing Abertis, Telepass, and Aeroporti di Roma; Avolta A.G. (via Schema Beta), the owner of Autogrill; Benetton Group S.r.l. (through Schema Eta); and significant stakes in Assicurazioni Generali S.p.A., Banca Monte dei Paschi di Siena, 2100 Ventures, and Cellnex Telecom S.A.

== History ==
Edizione’s history is characterized by a progressive diversification of its portfolio away from the core textile business and the adoption of a governance model that separates family ownership from professional management.

=== Origins and foundation (1950s-1986) ===
The entrepreneurial activities of the siblings Luciano, Gilberto, Giuliana, and Carlo Benetton began in the mid-1950s within the textile sector. Following rapid expansion, the group grew significantly during the 1970s, generating substantial financial resources. In 1981, the family holding company Edizione S.r.l. was established, owned in equal shares by the four siblings, to consolidate and manage the Benetton group’s holdings. During the same period, the textile holding company Invep was reorganized and subsequently renamed Benetton Group.

Between 1984 and 1985, Edizione began its initial diversification projects outside the textile industry – such as the acquisition of Calzaturificio di Varese – and benefited from the public listing of Benetton Group on the stock exchange, which provided additional financial capital. In 1985, the Group also acquired the British racing team Toleman, renaming it Benetton Formula the following year. The operation was intended to expand global brand visibility through sports-based communication. Between 1994 and 1995, the team won two Formula One World Drivers’ Championships and one Constructors’ Championship. In 1986, the appointment of Gianni Mion as General Manager marked the transition to a professional management structure focused on the administration and reorganization of the group’s holdings.

=== Diversification and initial challenges (1987-1993) ===
The late 1980s were marked by expansion into non-textile sectors. Edizione attempted to establish an international sporting goods group through Benetton Sportsystem (BSS), acquiring brands such as Nordica, Prince, Asolo, Kästle, and Rollerblade. The integration of these companies resulted in lower-than-expected financial performance. However, the operation led to a shift toward separating new investments from the group’s traditional core competencies.

In 1991, Edizione acquired Compañía de Tierras Sud Argentino S.A., an agricultural company primarily involved in livestock farming and wool production, managing over 940,000 hectares of land.

=== Privatizations and international expansion (1994-2000) ===
During the 1990s, Edizione participated in the privatization of Italian state-owned assets. Following the privatization of IRI in 1995, Edizione led a consortium of shareholders – including Leonardo Finanziaria (Del Vecchio family), the Swiss firm Mövenpick, and Crediop – to acquire a controlling stake in SME, thereby gaining control of Autogrill and Supermercati GS.

Autogrill was subsequently separated from GS and listed on the stock exchange in 1997, with Edizione remaining the controlling shareholder. In 1999, the group acquired Host Marriott Services (HMS) in the United States, expanding its operations in the motorway and airport catering sector. The stake in GS was sold to Carrefour in 2000.

=== Infrastructure and strategic developments (1999-2007) ===
Edizione entered the infrastructure sector in 1999, leading the Schemaventotto consortium to acquire a 30% stake in Società Autostrade. In 2003, it completed a tender offer for the remaining capital, financed through a leveraged buyout.

During the same period, the holding company invested in the telecommunications sector through interests in Blu and Telecom Italia (via Olimpia). These operations did not achieve the projected results and led to financial losses. In 2006, a proposed merger between Società Autostrade and Abertis was initiated but was ultimately blocked due to political factors.

=== Consolidation and reorganization (2007-2016) ===
In 2007, Edizione established the sub-holding Sintonia to consolidate its infrastructure assets. Between 2007 and 2012, Sintonia acquired Aeroporti di Roma (ADR), implementing a 2.5 billion euros investment plan. In 2013, the merger between Atlantia and Gemina integrated these infrastructure holdings into a single entity.

In the same year, Autogrill spun off its airport retail division into World Duty Free (WDF), which was listed on the stock exchange, with Edizione holding a 50.1% stake. This interest was sold to the Dufry group in 2015.

Effective January 1, 2009, Edizione Holding S.p.A. and Sintonia S.p.A. were merged into Ragione S.A.P.A., which subsequently converted into Edizione S.r.l. The four branches of the Benetton family maintain equal 25% ownership of the holding company through four investment vehicles: Evoluzione, Proposta, Regia, and Ricerca.

=== Reorganization and recent strategies (2018-2022) ===
Following the deaths of Carlo and Gilberto Benetton in 2018, the group faced a leadership transition involving 14 members of the second generation and representatives of the third. While Luciano Benetton had previously designated his son, Alessandro, as his successor, the other founders’ shares were distributed equally among their respective children. In June 2019, Gianni Mion was appointed chairman, while CEO Marco Patuano left the group. The Board of Directors at the time included Chairman Gianni Mion, Christian Benetton, Franca Bertagnin Benetton, Sabrina Benetton, Carlo Bertazzo, Fabio Cerchiai, and Giovanni Costa.

In November 2020, Mion resigned and was succeeded by Enrico Laghi, a former commissioner for Ilva and Alitalia, who was appointed to manage the final negotiations with CDP regarding the divestment of Autostrade per l’Italia. In May 2021, Atlantia’s shareholders approved the sale of Autostrade per l’Italia to a CDP-led consortium for 9.1 billion euros.

In January 2022, Alessandro Benetton was appointed chairman of Edizione, which transitioned to a joint-stock company (S.p.A.). As of 2025, the Board of Directors includes Alessandro Benetton (Chairman), Christian Benetton, Carlo Bertagnin Benetton, and Ermanno Boffa, alongside independent directors Vittorio Pignatti, Irene Boni, Laura Zanetti, and Annachiara Svelto.

=== Strategic shifts and new holdings (2022-present) ===
In 2022, the company participated, together with Blackstone, in a voluntary tender offer for Atlantia, which led to a restructuring of the company’s shareholding. Subsequently, in March 2023, the operation continued with the presentation of Mundys by Alessandro Benetton. At the time of the launch, the shareholders stated an investment strategy focused on international expansion, infrastructure development, technological innovation, and sustainability.

In 2023, Edizione took part in the business combination between Autogrill and World Duty Free, contributing its stake in Autogrill to facilitate the integration between the two companies. The operation led to the creation of Avolta, an international group active in the food service and travel retail sector. Following the corporate integration, in November 2024, Avolta Next established the F&B Innovation Hub, a business accelerator for the motorway catering sector modeled after the Innovation Hub at Rome-Fiumicino Airport. Activities focus on the adoption of technological systems such as AI-based automated waste sorting, product sensory analysis technologies, and digital platforms for the tourism and cultural promotion of territories during travel.

Also in 2023, following the tender offer for Atlantia, Edizione worked with Blackstone and Fondazione CRT to establish Mundys, a transnational project aimed at developing initiatives in the mobility and passenger services sector, with a focus on sustainability and innovation.

In 2024, Edizione was the subject of an academic case study at Harvard, which analyzed the diversification and transformation of the Benetton family holding. The study examined the company’s expansion in the 1990s and 2000s, the acquisitions of public assets, the corporate crisis management, the subsequent restructurings, including asset sales and the implementation of new governance structures. The study addresses future management strategies for the holding company’s assets, including the potential divestment of the Benetton brand.

In 2025, Edizione and its subsidiary 21 Invest expanded their venture capital activities by increasing their stake in 2100 Ventures fund. The operation expanded the fund’s industrial network and provided Edizione with exposure to emerging technological innovation and growth markets.

== Investment portfolio ==
As of December 31, 2024, Edizione S.p.A. holds direct and indirect stakes in companies across various industrial and financial sectors, managed through dedicated sub-holdings. The following structure is based on the company’s 2024 Annual Report.

=== Direct sub-holdings ===
Edizione fully controls eight operating companies that manage the group’s industrial and financial investments:

- Schema Alfa S.p.A. – Transport infrastructure (100%)
- Schema Beta S.p.A. – Food services and travel retail (100%)
- Schema Gamma S.r.l. – Digital infrastructure (100%)
- Schema Eta S.r.l. (formerly Benetton S.r.l.) – Apparel and textiles (100%)
- Edizione Property S.r.l. – Real estate (100%)
- Schema Epsilon S.r.l. – Real estate and agriculture (99.9%)
- Schema Delta S.p.A. – Financial institutions (100%)
- Schema Zeta S.r.l. (formerly Verde Sport S.r.l.) – Sports and culture (100%, effective January 1, 2025)

=== Major indirect and associate holdings ===
- Transport infrastructure (via Schema Alfa)
  - Mundys S.p.A. – 57.01% (listed)
  - Abertis Infraestructuras S.A. – 50%
  - Aeroporti di Roma S.p.A. – 99.39%
  - Azzurra Aeroporti S.r.l. – 60.40%
  - Aéroports de la Côte d’Azur S.A. – 64%
  - Telepass S.p.A. – 51%
  - Yunex Traffic – 100%
  - Getlink S.E. – 15.49% (listed)
  - Aeroporto Guglielmo Marconi di Bologna S.p.A. – 29.38% (listed)
- Food service and travel retail (via Schema Beta)
  - Avolta A.G. – 22.77% (listed)
- Digital infrastructure (via Schema Gamma)
  - Cellnex Telecom S.A. – 9.90% (listed)
- Apparel and textiles (via Schema Eta)
  - Benetton Group S.r.l. – 100%
  - Olimpias Group S.r.l. – 100%
  - Benetton Manufacturing S.r.l. – 100%
- Real estate and agriculture (via Schema Epsilon)
  - Maccarese S.p.A. Società Agricola Benefit – 100%
  - Compañía de Tierras Sud Argentino S.A.U. – 100%
  - Ganadera Condor S.A.U. – 100%
  - Edizione Renewables S.r.l. – 100% (established December 11, 2023)
- Financial institutions (via Schema Delta)
  - Assicurazioni Generali S.p.A. – 4.80% (listed)
  - Mediobanca S.p.A. – 2.24% (listed)
- Other sectors / sports (via Schema Zeta)
  - Verde Sport S.r.l. – 100% (formerly “La Ghirada”)
  - Benetton Rugby S.r.l. Società Sportiva Dilettantistica – 100%
  - Asolo Golf S.r.l. – 100%
- Direct and associate holdings
  - 2100 Ventures S.p.A. – 49.59% (venture capital; acquired December 2024)
  - Eurostazioni S.p.A. – 32.71%
  - Bensec S.c.a r.l. – 45% (plus an additional 16.5% indirect stake through Edizione Property S.r.l.)
  - San Giorgio S.r.l. – 100%

== Financial data ==
According to the 2024 Annual Report, Edizione S.p.A. closed the fiscal year with a net profit of €247.3 million and consolidated revenue of approximately €1.1 million (referring to the holding company’s standalone revenue, while consolidated revenue exceeded €10 billion), reflecting the company’s activity as a financial holding with income derived primarily from dividends and equity interests. The company’s workforce, referring to the holding company only, consisted of 21 employees.

As of December 31, 2024, shareholders’ equity amounted to €4.66 billion, while total assets were €6.34 billion. The net financial position was negative by approximately €1.64 billion, consistent with investments in holdings and funds. The Gross Asset Value (GAV) was €14.19 billion, with a Net Asset Value (NAV) of €13.19 billion.

The parent company’s operating profit was negative by approximately €23.2 million, offset by dividends and financial income from funds, including €200 million from Schema Alfa, €130 million from Schema Delta, and approximately €11 million from associate companies and investment funds. During 2024, Edizione provided approximately €205 million in capital contributions to subsidiaries and acquired 49.59% of 2100 Ventures S.p.A. The company has formally committed to provide financial support to Benetton Group until April 30, 2026.

In July 2024, Edizione contributed as an institutional supporter to the establishment of the Unhate Foundation, a non-profit organization that promotes dialogue and solidarity to counter the use of violence.

== Governance ==
The Board of Directors, in office until the approval of the 2024 financial statements, is chaired by Alessandro Benetton, with Enrico Laghi as CEO.

Board members include Christian Benetton, Carlo Bertagnin Benetton, Ermanno Boffa, Irene Boni, Francesca Cornelli, Claudio De Conto, and Vittorio Pignatti-Morano Campori.

The Board of Statutory Auditors, in office until the approval of the 2025 financial statements, is chaired by Aldo Laghi since April 8, 2025, succeeding Angelo Casò. Standing auditors are Livia Amidani Aliberti and Giorgio Grosso since April 8, 2025.

The audit firm is KPMG S.p.A., with a mandate until December 31, 2026.

== See also ==
- Benetton family
- Benetton Group
- Mundys
- Avolta
- Holding company
