= Oliviero Toscani =

Italian photographer (1942–2025)

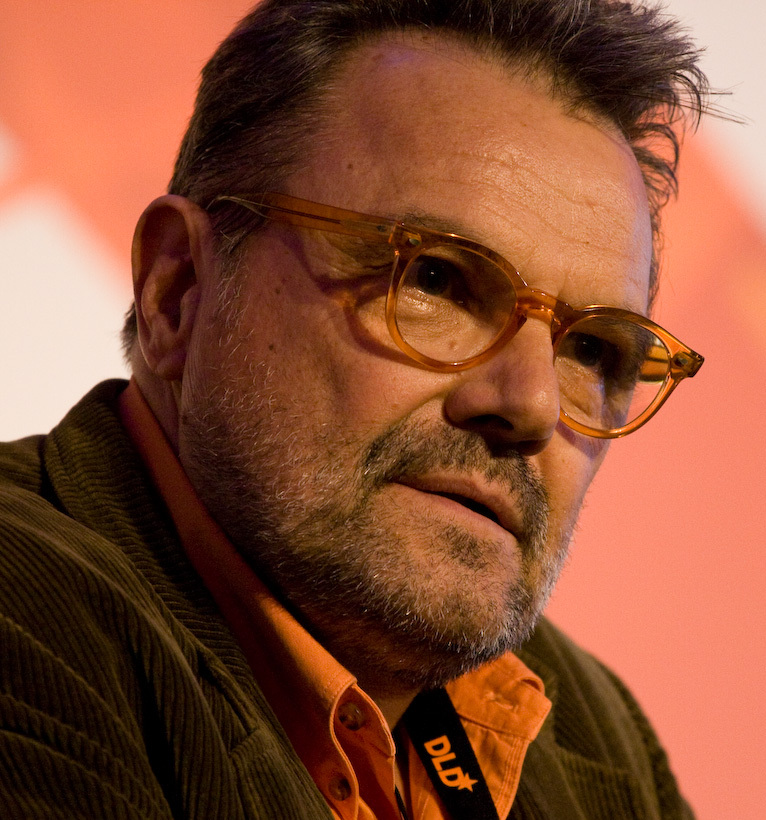
- Toscani in 2008
- Born: Oliviero Toscani; 28 February 1942; Milan, Kingdom of Italy
- Died: 13 January 2025 (aged 82); Cecina, Italy
- Occupation: Photographer
- Height: 1.82 m (6 ft 0 in)
- Spouse: Kirsti Toscani
- Children: 6

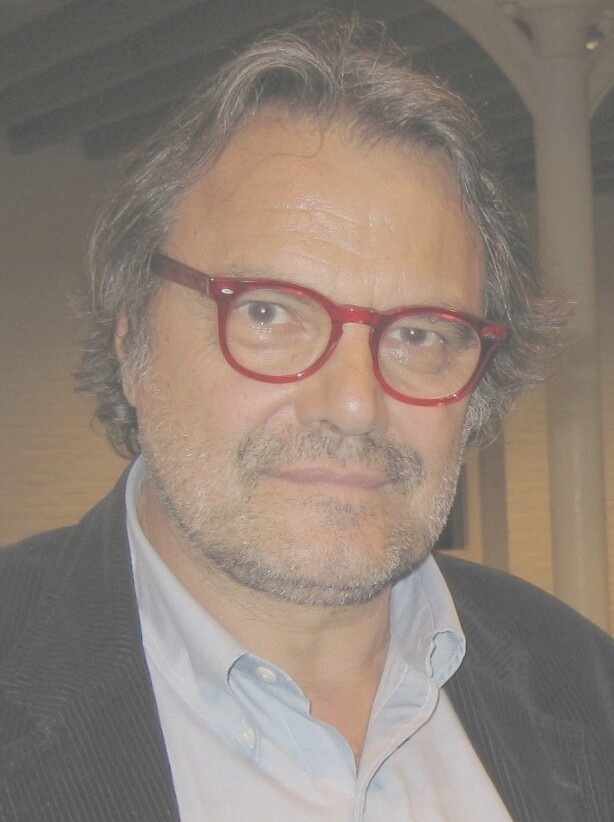
Toscani in 2013

Oliviero Toscani (28 February 1942 – 13 January 2025) was an Italian photographer, best-known worldwide for designing controversial advertising campaigns for Italian brand Benetton from 1982 to 2000.

== Early life and career ==
Toscani was born in Milan, and took up photography following in the footsteps of his father, Fedele Toscani, famous Italian photographer, founder with Vincenzo Carrese of the Publifoto photographic agency, then of his own photographic agency (Rotofoto), then photo reporter for the newspaper Corriere della Sera. After obtaining his diploma at the Kunstgewerbeschule Zürich, he started working with different magazines, including Elle, Vogue, L'Uomo Vogue and Harper's Bazaar.

== Career ==
In 1982, Toscani started working as Art Director for the Benetton Group. One of his most famous campaigns included a photo (by Therese Frare) of David Kirby dying of AIDS, lying in a Columbus, Ohio, hospital bed, surrounded by his grieving relatives. The picture was controversial due to its similarity to a pietà painting and because critics of the ad thought the use of this image to sell clothing was exploiting the victim, though the Kirby family stated that they authorized the use and that it helped increase AIDS awareness. Other advertisements included references to racism (notably one with three almost identical human hearts, which were actually pig hearts, with the words 'white', 'black', and 'yellow' as captions), war, religion and even capital punishment.

In the early 1990s, Toscani co-founded the magazine Colors (also owned by Benetton) with American graphic designer Tibor Kalman (1949-1999). With the tagline "a magazine about the rest of the world", Colors built on the multiculturalism prevalent at that time and in Benetton's ad campaigns, while remaining editorially independent from the group. Toscani left Benetton in 2000.

A long-term Tuscany resident, in 2003 he created, in collaboration with Regione Toscana, a new research facility for modern communication called 'La Sterpaia'. In 2005, Toscani sparked controversy again with his photographs for an advertising campaign for the men's clothing brand 'Ra-Re'. Their portrayals of men participating in homosexual behaviour angered groups such as the Catholic parents' association Movimento Italiano Genitori, who called the pictures 'vulgar'. The campaign came amidst ongoing debate in Italy about gay rights.

Toscani unsuccessfully stood as a candidate for parliament for the new Rose in the Fist party in the Italian general election held on 9 and 10 April 2006. In September 2007, a new campaign against anorexia was again controversial due to his shocking photography of an emaciated woman (Isabelle Caro).

When Luciano Benetton returned as executive director of the Benetton Group in January 2018, he brought along Toscani.

In 2018, Toscani became a member of Italy's Democratic Party (PD).

In 2020, Toscani was let go from Benetton Group after he controversially said of the 2018 Ponte Morandi collapse, "Who cares about a bridge collapse?". He was responding to an outcry over a photograph of founding members of a political protest movement alongside key members of the Benetton family. He later apologized for the statement.

Toscani suffered from amyloidosis. He was hospitalised on 10 January 2025 at the Cecina Hospital, where he died on 13 January, at the age of 82.
