= Francisco Reynés =

Francisco Reynés Massanet
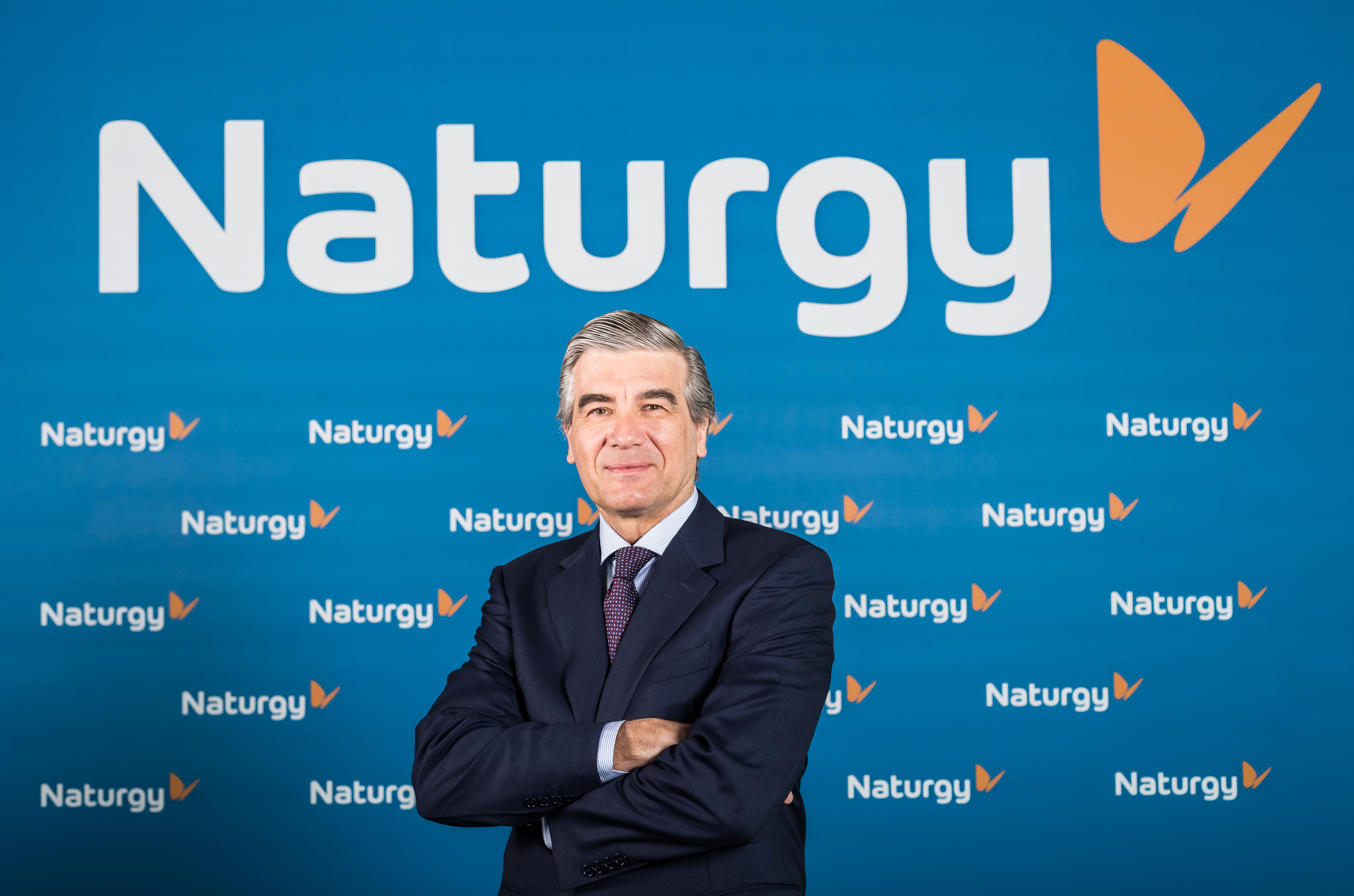
- Born: 1963
- Occupation: Chairman of Naturgy

Francisco Reynés Massanet (Mallorca, Spain, 1963), is a Spanish businessman and the current Executive Chairman of Naturgy (formerly Gas Natural Fenosa). Prior to this, he was CEO of Abertis Group, a role he held from 2010.

== Early life and education ==
Reynés studied industrial engineering at the University of Barcelona, specializing in mechanical engineering, and an MBA at IESE Business School.

== Career ==
Reynés has held executive positions in Gas Natural Fenosa, Segur Caixa Holding, Boursorama and Adeslas, among others. He was named in July 2007 General Manager of Criteria CaixaCorp, La Caixa business holding. From this position he carried out the process for the company to go public in October 2007.

In 2010, Reynés was appointed CEO of Abertis Group and Vicechairman in 2015. He represented Abertis Infrastructuras on the Governing Boards of Sanef in Paris, Arteris in São Paulo and Hispasat in Madrid. Under his direction, Abertis has become the largest toll road business in the world with more than 7,500km under management.

== Other activities ==
- Veolia, Independent Member of the Board of Directors (since 2023)
- Cellnex Telecom, Chair of the Board of Directors (2015–2018)

== Awards ==
- In 2016, he received the Tiepolo Award, jointly granted by the Italian Chamber of Commerce and Industry (CCIS) and the Spanish Confederation of Employers' Organisations (CEOE).
- In March 2018, he received the 2017 Influentials Award from El Confidencial and Herbert Smith Freehills for Executive of the Year.
- In July 2021, he received the ‘Best CEO 2020’ award granted by Forbes Spain.
- In December 2021, Reynés received the 'CEO of the Year' award at the Platts Global Energy Awards.
