= Benetton family =

Italian business-owning family

Four members of the Italian Benetton family (Italian pronunciation: [benetˈton]) founded the Benetton Group S.p.A. fashion company in 1965. The three brothers and one sister were all born in Treviso, Veneto, Italy. Their father owned a bicycle shop. Through Edizione, a financial holding company, they control a number of other businesses including 30% of Atlantia S.p.A., an operator of nearly two-thirds of Italy's motorways, 60% of Autogrill, a chain of roadside restaurants, and investments in the hotel industry including the Hotel Monaco & Grand Canal in Venice, Italy.

- Luciano Benetton (born 13 May 1935) is currently on the board as a non executive director. He is also on the board of directors of Edizione S.r.l.. From 1992 to 1994, he was a senator of the Italian Republic for the Italian Republican Party. He has five children, Mauro (born 16 June 1962), Alessandro (born 2 March 1964), Rossella (born 23 June 1965), Rocco (born 29 September 1969) and Brando. They all live in Treviso, Italy.
- Giuliana Benetton (born 8 July 1937) is currently on the board of directors of both Edizione S.r.l. and Benetton Group. She has had the responsibility for planning Benetton's knitwear collections and coordinating product lines. Giuliana actually began the family business by knitting sweaters, which her brother Luciano would peddle by bicycle. She is married and has four children, Paola, Franca, Daniela and Carlo.
- Gilberto Benetton (19 June 1941 – 22 October 2018) was chairman of Edizione S.r.l. and oversaw all financial and real estate investing. Gilberto Benetton was also chairman of Autogrill and a director of the Benetton Group. He was a director of Atlantia S.p.A. and Mediobanca S.p.A. He was also a board member of Pirelli S.p.A. and Allianz. He had two children Barbara and Sabrina who live in Treviso, Italy.
- Carlo Benetton (26 December 1943 – 10 July 2018) was deputy chairman of both Edizione S.r.l. and Benetton Group. He was in charge of production and of the liaison between Benetton's headquarters and its international units. He had five children, Stefano, Massimo, Andrea, Christian and Leone who all live in Treviso, Italy. His son Stefano was killed in a car crash in the United States of America in 1985 at age 18. Carlo died of cancer on 10 July 2018.

== The next generation ==
- Franca Benetton, Alessandro Benetton, Sabrina Benetton, and Christian Benetton have been appointed board members of the Edizione S.r.l., the main holding of the family, and they will be the ones representing the new generation of the Benettons.
- Alessandro Benetton was born on 2 March 1964 in Treviso, eldest son of Luciano Benetton. He received a Bachelor of Science degree from Boston University and an MBA from Harvard. He worked as an analyst at the global finance department at Goldman Sachs in London. In 1993, he founded "21 Investimenti S.p.A.," a merchant bank, and is currently chairman of that company. In 2004, he was appointed deputy chairman of the Benetton Group with the special responsibility of overseeing the company's expansion in East Asia, particularly China and India. He is currently chairman of Benetton Group and a board member of Autogrill. He also sits on the advisory committee of Robert Bosch Internationale Beteiligungen and is on the council of Confindustria (Confederation of Italian Industry). He has three children, Agnese, Tobias and Luce.
- Rocco Benetton was born on 29 September 1969 in Treviso. He is also a son of Luciano and Maria Teresa Benetton. After studying mechanical engineering at Boston University, he moved to New York, where he worked at hedge funds, Oppenheimer & Co. and Alpha Investment Management. He served at the latter as managing director. In 1997, he moved to England, where he managed the Benetton Formula One team until the 2000 season. He then moved back to Treviso, where he founded the companies Zero Rh+ and Oot Group. In 2003, he temporarily joined the board of Banca del Gottardo Italia.
