= David Richards (motorsport executive) =

British motorsport executive (born 1952)

David Richards CBE
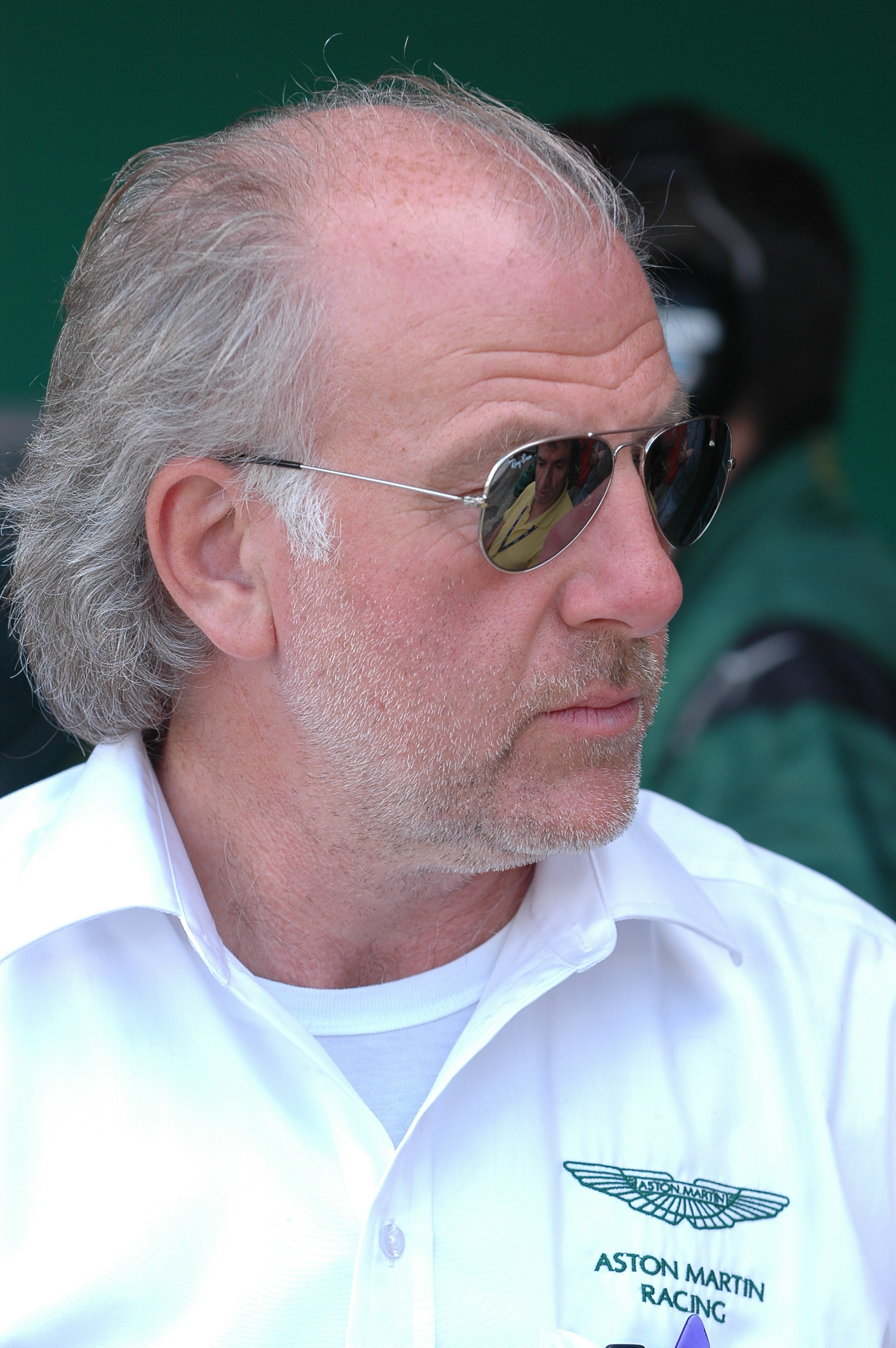
- Richards in 2005
- Born: 3 June 1952 (age 74); Ruthin, Denbighshire, Wales
- Occupations: Chairman of Prodrive; Chairman of Motorsport UK

Personal information
- Nationality: (United Kingdom) British

World Rally Championship record
- Years active: 1974–1976, 1979–1981
- Driver: (United Kingdom) Tony Drummond (United Kingdom) Tony Pond (Finland) Ari Vatanen
- Teams: Opel, British Leyland, Ford
- Rallies: 25
- Co-championships: 1 (1981)
- Rally wins: 4
- Podiums: 11
- Stage wins: 198
- First rally: 1974 RAC Rally
- First win: 1980 Acropolis Rally
- Last win: 1981 1000 Lakes Rally
- Last rally: 1981 RAC Rally

David Pender Richards CBE is the chairman of Prodrive and chairman of Motorsport UK. He is former chairman of Aston Martin and a former team principal of the BAR and Benetton Formula One teams.

== Education ==
Richards attended Ysgol Brynhyfryd in Ruthin.

== Rally driving ==
Richards won the 1981 World Rally Championship as a co-driver to Ari Vatanen.

== Prodrive circuit racing ==
In 1987, Prodrive entered into what was to become a long-standing partnership with BMW in the British Touring Car Championship. They took the Class B title three times, from 1988 to 1990, winning outright in 1988 with Frank Sytner.

== Formula One ==
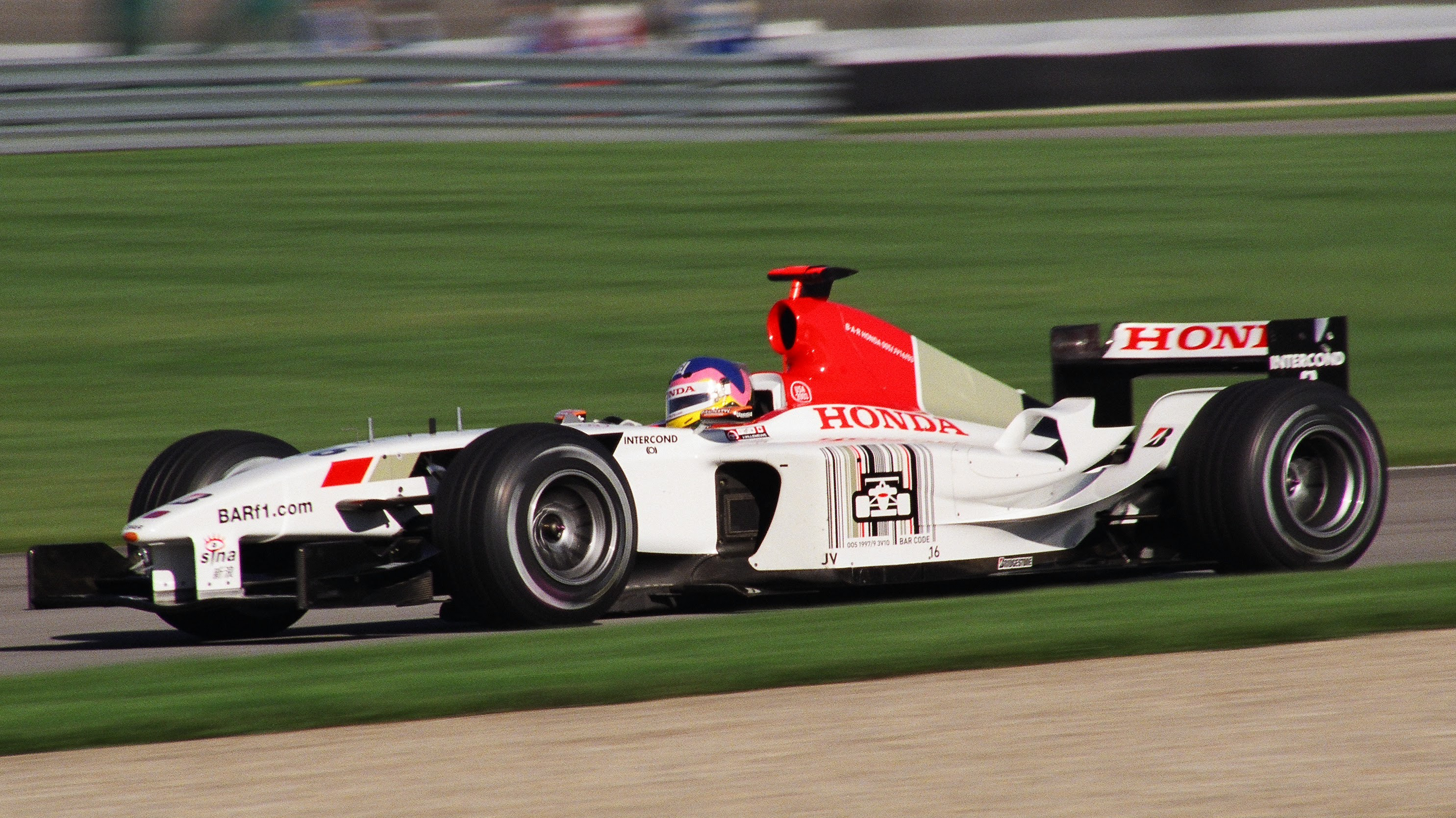
Jacques Villeneuve driving for the then Prodrive-run BAR team at the US Grand Prix at Indianapolis in 2003

Richards became chief executive of Benetton Formula in 1998, replacing Flavio Briatore. He left after just a year in his post and was replaced by Rocco Benetton for 1999.

When the British American Racing (BAR) team was restructuring after the departure of Craig Pollock in 2001, the owners, British American Tobacco (BAT), brought in Prodrive to run the team with Richards as its team principal. Under his direction, there was an immediate improvement in performance, ultimately leading to the team taking second place in the 2004 F1 Constructors' Championship. Richards also brought Jenson Button to the team and made him lead driver, providing the majority of their championship points in 2004. This success led to BAT selling a 45% share of the team to Honda in late 2004. With Prodrive having completed its management contract with BAT, Richards stood down as team principal and Prodrive's then managing director Nick Fry assumed this role.

Richards' Prodrive company entered a bid to enter a Formula One team for the 2008 season and on 28 April 2006, Prodrive were officially granted entry when the FIA announced the list of entrants to the 2008 Formula One World Championship. However, on 22 November 2007, he was forced to announce that Prodrive F1 would not be competing in the 2008 Formula One World Championship after a lack of clarity over the legality of 'customer cars' and the threat of possible legal action.

== Aston Martin ==
On 12 March 2007, Richards led a consortium of investors including Investment Dar and Adeem Investment, raising $925 million to finance the purchase of Aston Martin from Ford. Richards subsequently became chairman of the car company. He stepped down from this role at the end of 2013.

== Personal life ==
On 16 September 2007, Richards and his wife, Karen, survived a forced landing in their helicopter in Essex whilst returning from the 2007 Belgian Grand Prix, less than 24 hours after his former WRC driver, Colin McRae, perished in a similar accident along with his son and two others. Based on Prodrive's statement after the incident, Richards was piloting Prodrive's Eurocopter EC 135. Both Richards and his wife Karen walked away unharmed.

In the 2005 New Year Honours, Richards was appointed a CBE for his services to motorsport. In 2017, he was inducted into the Motor Sport Hall of Fame and received the Spirit of Le Mans award from the Automobile Club de l’Ouest (ACO). In 2019, he received the Autocar Outstanding Leader Award. Cranfield School of Management awarded Richards an Honorary Doctor of Science degree in 2008.
