= Gilberto Benetton =

Italian industrialist businessman

- Born: 19 June 1941; Treviso, Italy
- Died: 22 October 2018 (aged 77); Treviso, Italy
- Occupation: Co-founder of Benetton Group
- Spouse: Lalla Benetton
- Children: 2 daughters
- Relatives: Luciano Benetton (brother); Carlo Benetton (brother); Giuliana Benetton (sister); Alessandro Benetton (nephew)

Gilberto Benetton (19 June 1941 – 22 October 2018) was an Italian billionaire businessman, one of Europe's most influential industrialists. He was a co-founder of Benetton Group, the Italian fashion brand which he started and ran with his three siblings. In October 2018, Forbes estimated the net worth of Gilberto Benetton, and each of his siblings, at US$2.7 billion. In June 2018, the conglomerate he created had assets of €12.1 billion.

== Career ==
Benetton left school at 14, after his father died, and worked at local firms until starting United Colours of Benetton with his siblings in 1965. The company initially made clothing on a homemade production line in Ponzano Veneto near Venice. The company became well known for its brightly colored clothing. By the 1980s the company was distributing in 100 countries, and the Benetton family had become billionaires.

After his family company's success in the 1980s, Benetton diversified into infrastructure, including roads, telecom, catering, and agriculture. He acquired Autogrill, a motorway food service company. Then Atlantia, the owner of Autostrade with contracts in road and airport construction. He also acquired stakes in Telecom Italia, Mediobanca, Pirelli, and RCS Mediagroup. In 2018 he organized the acquisition of Abertis, a motorway group from Spanish building firm ACS.

The Benetton Group was controversial for its ads, which often went against the social norms of the time. The ads challenged social taboos such as sexuality, war, racism, and AIDS. In 2011 the company pulled an ad featuring a photoshopped image of the Pope kissing a prominent Islamic cleric after the Vatican complained. The company became one of the world's largest retail groups, with 5000 stores in 120 companies. However, since 2000 it has seen dwindling sales.

Originally, each of the four Benetton siblings had an equal quarter share of Edizione. Benetton was the former chairman of Edizione, the family's holding company which controls Atlantia. He was vice-president of Edizione when he died. He was the former chairman of one of their key investments, Autogrill highway and airport restaurants, and at his death he was vice-president.

He was the only family member on the Atlantia board. He faced a crisis in August 2018 when the Genoa bridge collapse killed 43 people, a unit of Atlantia was the bridge operator. There were claims the weakness in the bridge was known in advance, and that the disaster was avoidable. The holding company Edizione lost €2 billion in value after the incident.

In the years leading up to his death, Benetton had brought non-family member Marco Patuano in to run the Edizione company he had previously been head of, and indicated it should operate like a sovereign wealth fund. It is expected that he will be succeeded in his board role by Gilberto's daughter Sabrina.

== Personal life ==
Benetton was married to Lalla, they had two daughters, Barbara and Sabrina, and lived in Treviso, Italy.

He was inducted into the Italian Basketball Hall of Fame, in 2012. This was due to his contribution to the sport of Italian basketball, while he was the owner of the Italian professional basketball club Treviso Basket. He started sponsoring the club in 1978, bought the club in 1980, and had financed the club from his business career. He also sponsored rugby and volleyball clubs in Treviso. The Benetton's sold out of the basketball and volleyball clubs in 2012. The Benetton family is now only focused on the rugby club.

Italian newspapers had reported that Benetton's health started to decline after the Genoa bridge disaster and the death of his brother Carlo in July. He died aged 77, on 22 October 2018, at his home in Treviso, Italy. A statement from the Benetton Group said "His wife Lalla, daughters Barbara and Sabrina and son-in-law Ermanno were with him in his final moments".
