= Massimo Renon =

Italian businessman (born July 6, 1970)

Massimo Renon (born July 6, 1970) is an Italian businessman. He was the CEO of the Benetton Group from April 2020 to June 2024.

== Biography ==
Renon studied at the Bologna University where he graduated in political science and business management.

Renon started his career at Giacomelli Sport where he managed retail development. In 2000, he joined the luxury eyewear manufacturer Luxottica, where he served as regional manager, wholesale coordinator, and then Director of Eastern Europe. In 2010, he joined the Ferrari group as commercial and customer service director, but shortly thereafter returned to the eyewear sector by working with the Safilo Group in 2012 as head of the EMEA region. In 2017, he became CEO of the eyewear manufacturer Marcolin as worldwide commercial general manager when the Marcolin created a joint-venture with LVMH.

In March 2020, he was named CEO of the Benetton Group.

In June 2024, he voluntarily stepped down as the CEO of the Benetton Group and was replaced by Claudio Sforza.
