= Aeroporti di Roma =

- Native name: Aeroporti di Roma S.p.A.
- Type: Subsidiary
- Founded: 1997; 29 years ago
- Headquarters: 320 via dell'Aeroporto, Fiumicino, Italy
- Key people: Vincenzo Nunziata (president); Marco Troncone (CEO)
- Revenue: ▲€1,017 billion (2017)
- Operating income: ▲€271.001 million (2014)
- Net income: ▲€136.509 million (2014)
- Total assets: ▼€2.784 billion (2014)
- Total equity: ▲€1.085 billion (2014)
- Owner: Mundys (95.9%); Lazio region (1.3%); Rome (1.3%); Rome Chamber of Commerce (0.8%); Province of Rome (0.3%); Fiumicino (0.1%); others (0.3%)
- Parent: Mundys
- Subsidiaries: ADR Sviluppo; ADR Tel; ADR Assistance; ADR Security; ADR Mobility; Airport Cleaning
- Website: Official website

Aeroporti di Roma S.p.A. (abbreviated ADR) is an Italian fixed-base operator of Rome Fiumicino Airport (in Greater Rome) and Rome Ciampino Airport since 1997 (the year of privatization). The headquarter of the company is located in Rome Fiumicino Airport.

The company was a minority shareholders of Aeroporto di Genova (15%), as well as Airports Company South Africa from 1998 to 2005.
