= Telepass =

Italian mobile app and toll collector

Telepass logo from 2021.

Logo used from 2003 to 2021

Film showing the approach to and passing of a toll station in Italy, using a Telepass OBU. Note the yellow Telepass lane signs and road markings and the sound emitted by the OBU when passing the lane

Telepass is the brand name for an electronic toll collection system used to collect toll (pedaggio) on motorways (autostrade) in Italy operated by Autostrade per l'Italia S.p.A., its affiliates, and other legal entities. The system was introduced in 1989.

== Overview of the Telepass system ==
=== Implementations ===
There are three main Telepass implementations:

- Telepass Family, which can be linked to a bank account or a credit card account,
- Telepass with ViaCard, which can be used with a ViaCard toll charge card linked to a bank account or credit card account,

Telepass can be used for all types of vehicles which can travel on Italian motorways. Telepass consists of an On-Board Unit (OBU) mounted at the top of the vehicle's windscreen. The OBU is battery-powered. Telepass Family and Telepass with ViaCard OBUs need to be replaced after approx. three years. Telepass Ricaricabile OBUs have user-replaceable batteries. The OBUs communicate with the electronic toll booths by dedicated short-range communications.

Telepass is used on motorways in the open and the closed systems. Toll in the open system consists of a flat fee charged for the use of a motorway or a part thereof, regardless of the distance travelled. Toll in the closed system is charged depending on the distance. In both systems, the toll varies according to the type of vehicle (car, bus, lorry etc.) and to the upkeep for the motorway.

Telepass is currently available on most motorway entries and exits. At large toll stations, like the Brenner Pass station, all lanes, including lanes supervised by toll cashiers (esattori), are equipped for Telepass use, at smaller stations, there are special Telepass-only lanes and lanes for Telepass and ViaCard use (porta bimodale or porta multimodale).

Telepass Ricaricabile (rechargeable) was introduced in March 2006 in the Naples area in southern Italy. It is currently being tested for reliability and is eventually to be available on all Italian motorways which support Telepass family. For Telepass Ricaricabile, the user is required to make pre-payments in person, by phone or on-line. No bank or credit card accounts are required, and Telepass Ricaricabile is therefore of special interest to foreign visitors. Telepass Ricaricabile uses an OBU different from the other Telepass versions.

=== Eligibility for the use of Telepass ===
Telepass Family is open to any user with an approved Italian credit card or bank account; Telepass with ViaCard is open to all ViaCard holders. Telepass Ricaricabile is open to any user. For all three implementations, the user doesn't need to be a citizen or resident of Italy, and the vehicle doesn't need to have Italian number plates.

=== Cost ===
The quarterly service charge for Telepass Family and Telepass with ViaCard is EUR 3.78. If the toll incurred in a quarter exceeds EUR 258.23, the service charge is increased to EUR 3.72 per month until the toll incurred in a quarter falls to below EUR 258.23. There are no discounts on tolls for Telepass users.

=== Operation ===
Sign indicating the lane reserved for electronic toll systems.

Sign indicating the lane reserved for Telepass customers. This signal has been removed since 2022, in exchange for a more generic signal indicating electronic toll collection (see above).

Telepass users must use lanes designated with the electronic toll logo and travel no faster than 30 km/h when in the lane. Once the OBU has been identified and verified, the OBU emits a single high beep, and the barrier blocking the lane is lifted. When the user exits the toll lane, the OBU emits a second single high beep. A series of three high beeps indicates the OBU's battery is nearing exhaustion and the OBU or its battery should be replaced. A low beep indicates the OBU has not been able to communicate with the toll station, was identified as blocked, or, in case of Telepass Ricaricabile, does not have sufficient funds left to pay for the toll incurred. In all these cases, the barrier remains closed, and the user must signal the toll station supervisor by pressing the red Help (Assistenza) button. The number plate is then photographed, and the vehicle allowed to continue. The vehicle is subsequently identified by its number plate, and the owner is sent a bill for the toll which could not be collected automatically.

In case no electronic toll lanes are available when entering the motorway, the user is issued an entry ticket and must insert that ticket upon exiting the motorway through a multimode lane capable of handling Telepass and ViaCard (porta bimodale or porta multimodale). In such a multimode lane, the toll will be charged automatically by the OBU once the ticket has been inserted, in cashier-only lanes, the toll cashier will manually conclude the transaction and have the toll charged to the user's account.

The toll collection and billing systems of all motorway operators in Italy have been interoperating automatically since 1988. Since that time, a driver needs to pay toll only once when exiting the motorway, even if the journey has spanned motorways operated by different carriers.

== Overview of important Toll-related regulations ==
In case a driver has selected an incorrect lane in a toll station (for instance, a Telepass-only lane if the vehicle is not equipped with a Telepass OBU), or if the toll equipment malfunctions, the driver must call for assistance using the red Assistenza button.

Toll which, for whatever reason, the user could not be charged automatically or pay immediately must be paid within 15 days of receipt of the corresponding invoice; in case of late payment, a flat late payment charge is imposed. Toll can be paid at any motorway customer service centre (Punto blu) or by bank transfer. If a toll is not paid, the vehicle will be identified the next time a toll station is passed, and the toll collected.

If a user loses the entry ticket prior to exiting the motorway, the toll assessed will be calculated from the most distant motorway access road accessible via the same route unless the user can prove by documentary evidence (hotel invoices, petrol receipts etc.) to have entered the motorway at another access.

== See also ==
- Electronic toll collection
- Toll road
