= Atlantia =

Atlantia may refer to:

- Kingdom of Atlantia, a regional designation used within the Society for Creative Anachronism
- Atlantia (company), an Ireland-based clinical research organisation
- Atlantia (company), an Italy-based toll road operator
- Gaia III: Atlantia, an album by the band Mago de Oz
- Atlantia (book), a 2014 young adult fantasy novel by Ally Condie
- Atlantia, the third zone in the 2009 video game Henry Hatsworth and the Puzzling Adventure
- Atlanteia or Atlantia, in Greek mythology was a Hamadryad nymph who consorted with Danaus
