= Abertis =

Spanish conglomerate corporation

Abertis Infraestructuras, S.A.
- Company type: Private
- Industry: Infrastructure
- Founded: April 2003; 23 years ago
- Headquarters: Madrid, Spain
- Key people: Marcelino Fernández Verdes (chairman); José Aljaro Navarro (CEO)
- Products: Motorway toll road concessions
- Revenue: €5,323 million (2017)
- Operating income: €2,058 million (2017)
- Net income: €1,291 million (2017)
- Owner: Mundys; ACS Group; Hochtief
- Number of employees: 15,046 (2017)
- Website: www.abertis.com

Abertis Infraestructuras, S.A. (Spanish pronunciation: [aˈβeɾtis iɱfɾaestɾuɣˈtuɾas]) is a Spanish worldwide corporation engaged in toll road management. The company is headquartered in Madrid. The company runs over 8,600 kilometres of toll roads in the world. In October 2018, it was acquired by Italian corporation Mundys and Spanish firm ACS Group and the German company Hochtief.

== History ==
In April 2003, Acesa Infraestructures, a business founded in 1967 as Autopistas, Concesionaria Española S.A., merged with Aurea Concesiones de Infraestructuras, a business founded in 1971 as Autopistas de Mare Nostrum (into which Dragados had spun off its own toll roads), to form Abertis.

In December 2003, the Abertis Group acquired Retevision, a leading Spanish radio and television distribution business; in June 2004, it acquired Iberpistas, another Spanish toll road operator. In December 2005, it acquired the French toll road operator Sanef.

An attempt initiated in April 2006, to acquire Atlantia (formerly Autostrade), the leading Italian toll road operator, was aborted in January 2008, after opposition from the Italian Government. Abertis then planned to sell some of its stake in the company.

On May 19, 2008, Abertis, along with Citi Infrastructure Investors of New York City, submitted a $12.8 billion proposal to lease the Pennsylvania Turnpike in the U.S. state of Pennsylvania for 75 years. However, the consortium withdrew the offer on September 30, 2008 as they felt the proposal would not win approval in the state legislature.

In 2009, Abertis got control of AP-68 concessionaire Avasa (Spain), and of Elqui and Rutas del Pacífico (Chile). In 2011, Metropistas, an Abertis subsidiary, won the concession for the PR-22 and PR-5 toll roads in Puerto Rico. In 2012, Abertis acquired Arteris, a Group managing nine toll road concessions in Brazil and integrated additional three new toll roads in Chile. In 2015, the company took over Autopista del Sol and Los Libertadores, also in Chile. In 2016, Abertis entered Italy through the concessionaire A4 Holding. The company also acquired 100% of Autopista Central in Santiago (Chile). In the same year, the firm created Emovis, a subsidiary for development and management of technology and information services to offer electronic toll solutions and intelligent mobility.

In 2017, the Abertis Group entered into Asia through the acquisition of two toll roads in India.

In October 2018, it was acquired by Italian corporation Atlantia, the Spanish firm ACS Group and the German company Hochtief.
