= Giuliana Benetton =

Italian entrepreneur (born 1937)

- Born: 8 July 1937 (age 89); Treviso, Italy
- Occupation: Co-founder of Benetton Group
- Spouse: married
- Children: 4
- Relatives: Luciano Benetton (brother); Carlo Benetton (brother); Gilberto Benetton (brother); Alessandro Benetton (nephew)

Giuliana Benetton (born 8 July 1937) is an Italian billionaire businesswoman, one of the co-founders of Benetton Group, the Italian fashion brand.

In May 2015, Forbes estimated the net worth of Giuliana Benetton and each of her three siblings at US$2.9 billion.

In 2018, the Benetton family, of which Giuliana Benetton is one of the founding members, was the controlling shareholder of Atlantia through the family holding company Edizione Holding and its subsidiary Sintonia; Atlantia controlled Autostrade per l'Italia.

On 14 August 2018, the collapse of the Morandi Bridge in Genoa, an infrastructure managed by Autostrade per l'Italia, killed 43 people. Following the tragedy, the Benetton family and the group's corporate structure became the subject of public controversy and debate concerning the management of Italy's motorway network and the system of motorway concessions.

== Career ==
Benetton started her business with her three brothers. She knitted sweaters that her brother Luciano delivered on his bicycle. As of today, the company consists of a network of 6,000 stores in 120 countries, operated by independent partners, generating a turnover of more than €2 billion a year.

== Personal life ==
Benetton is married with four children and lives in Treviso, Italy.
