= Carlo Benetton =

Italian businessman (1943–2018)

- Born: 26 December 1943; Morgano, Italy
- Died: 10 July 2018 (aged 74); Treviso, Italy
- Occupation: Businessman
- Known for: Co-founder of Benetton Group
- Children: 4
- Relatives: Luciano Benetton (brother); Giuliana Benetton (sister); Gilberto Benetton (brother); Alessandro Benetton (nephew)

Carlo Benetton (26 December 1943 – 10 July 2018) was an Italian billionaire businessman. He was one of the co-founders of Benetton Group, the Italian fashion brand.

In May 2015, Forbes estimated the net worth of Carlo Benetton and each of his three siblings at US$2.9 billion.

== Biography ==
Carlo Benetton was the youngest of Leone Benetton and Rosa Carniato's four children. In 1965, he founded the Benetton Group in Ponzano Veneto, together with his siblings Luciano Benetton, Gilberto, and Giuliana.

After the Benetton group was founded, Carlo Benetton was responsible for procurement, raw materials and maintaining the Benettons' vast estates in Argentina. He was also president of Tenute Maccarese in Lazio, one of Italy's most important agricultural companies.

== Personal life ==
Benetton had four children and lived in Treviso, Italy. He died on 10 July 2018 at his home in Treviso.
