= Leleque =

Coordinates: 42°23′S 71°03′W

- Municipality and village
- Interactive map of Leleque
- Country: Argentina
- Province: Chubut Province
- Time zone: UTC−3 (ART)

Leleque is a village and municipality in Chubut Province in southern Argentina.
