= David Kirby (activist) =

American activist (1957–1990)

The famous photo of David Kirby dying from AIDS next to his father, sister, and niece

David Lawrence Kirby (December 6, 1957 – May 5, 1990) was an American HIV/AIDS activist, and the subject of a photograph taken at his deathbed by Therese Frare. The image was published in Life magazine, which called it the "picture that changed the face of AIDS".

The image shows Kirby, near death, a vacant look on his face, and his father holding his son's head in a moment of grief. Other members of Kirby's immediate family are seated next to him. Life featured the image in its November 1990 issue, after which it gained first national and then international attention. The picture was later used by United Colors of Benetton in an advertising campaign, with the permission of Kirby's family, who felt that its use would show the devastating effects of AIDS.

== Early life ==
David Kirby was born on December 6, 1957 in a small Ohio town. Kirby found his adolescence particularly challenging as a gay teenager growing up in the often more conservative Midwest.

== Therese Frare's relationship to David Kirby ==
While a patient at Pater Noster House, a hospice for people with AIDS, Kirby established a relationship with Therese Frare, a graduate student from Ohio University. Frare was at Pater Noster for college project credit shadowing a caregiver named Peta, who was providing care to Kirby. Peta was also HIV positive and formed a strong bond of trust with Kirby and Kirby's family. Because of the relationship between Peta and Frare, Kirby became familiar with Frare. He said that Frare could photograph him in his declining condition, as long as the pictures would not be used for profit.

Frare was with Peta when co-workers contacted Peta with the news that Kirby's condition was growing worse and that his impending death was expected. Kirby's family invited Frare into the room to record the final moments of his life and their grief at his death. The family said that they hoped some good would come of the images Frare took of the final moments of their son's life.

When published by Life, the image shocked the national conscience in the United States with its graphic imagery. While the public knew that AIDS killed, many only knew of its effects in the abstract. AIDS was still thought to be a "gay" disease and much of populace was relatively uninformed about the disease. The image also helped the greater public to connect to the family's grief at losing their son. Life received complaints about the graphic nature of the image, but felt that it was in line with the magazine's mission of telling a story of life and death through visual imagery.

Frare's image also won the 2nd prize in the 1991 World Press Photo General News contest.

== 1992 Benetton advertising campaign ==
Following the Life publication, the Kirby family allowed the clothing company United Colors of Benetton to use the image in a 1992 advertising campaign, feeling that its story would reach a worldwide audience. Fallout from the campaign came from many sources, including some people in the Catholic Church which felt that the image was an inappropriate allusion to artistic imagery of the Virgin Mary cradling Jesus Christ after the crucifixion.

The image being made public brought the AIDS crisis, and the patient rights and ethics surrounding HIV/AIDS, into view of the broader public, allowing for a new wave of empathy. Patient stories like David Kirby helped further the AIDS Action Now movement by shining a light on the hidden political motivations, beliefs, and policies embedded within society and the medical field. Both the Tim McCaskell and Philip Berger transcripts of the AIDS Activist History Project also show AIDS advocates, or more broadly - patient advocates, standing their ground in academic and public spaces. They advocated for the right to inclusion and bodily autonomy and made clear their ability to withhold or withdraw consent and participation in research and medical trials at any time.

In 2012, Frare told Life that David's father Bill Kirby expressed the family's feelings on the use of the picture by United Colors of Benetton when he told Frare, "Listen, Therese. Benetton didn't use us, or exploit us. We used them. Because of them, your photo was seen all over the world, and that's exactly what David wanted."
