= Benetton Group =

Global fashion brand

Coordinates: 45.7081087°N 12.2179756°E

Benetton Group S.r.l.
- Type: Società a responsabilità limitata (s.r.l.)
- Industry: Fashion
- Founded: 1965 in Ponzano Veneto, Italy
- Founder: Luciano Benetton; Carlo Benetton; Gilberto Benetton; Giuliana Benetton
- Headquarters: Ponzano Veneto, Italy
- Area served: Worldwide
- Key people: Christian Coco (chairman); Claudio Sforza (CEO)
- Products: Clothing; Shoes; Bags; Accessories
- Number of employees: 1,500 (2020)
- Parent: Edizione
- Website: benettongroup.com

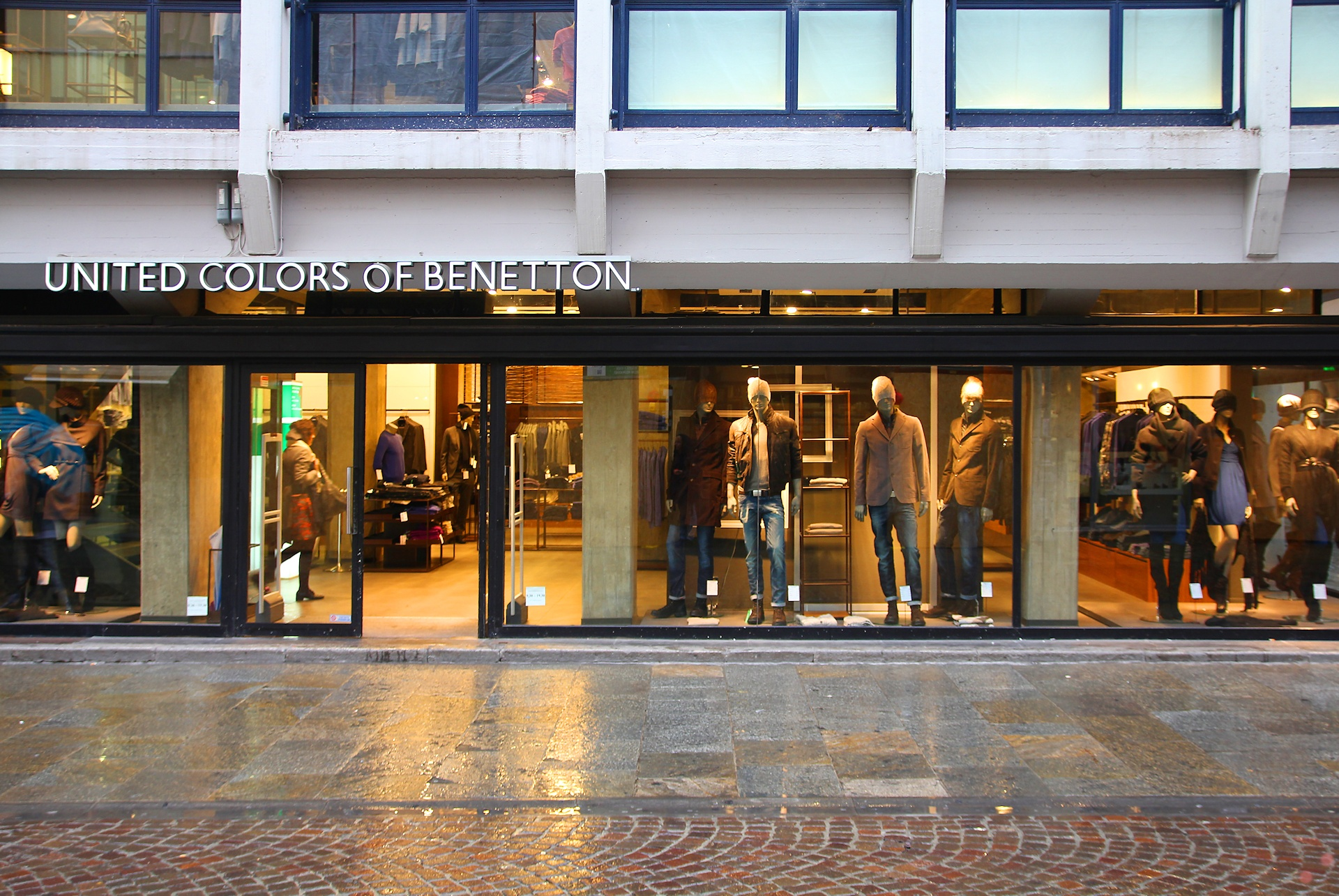
United Colors of Benetton in Parma, Italy

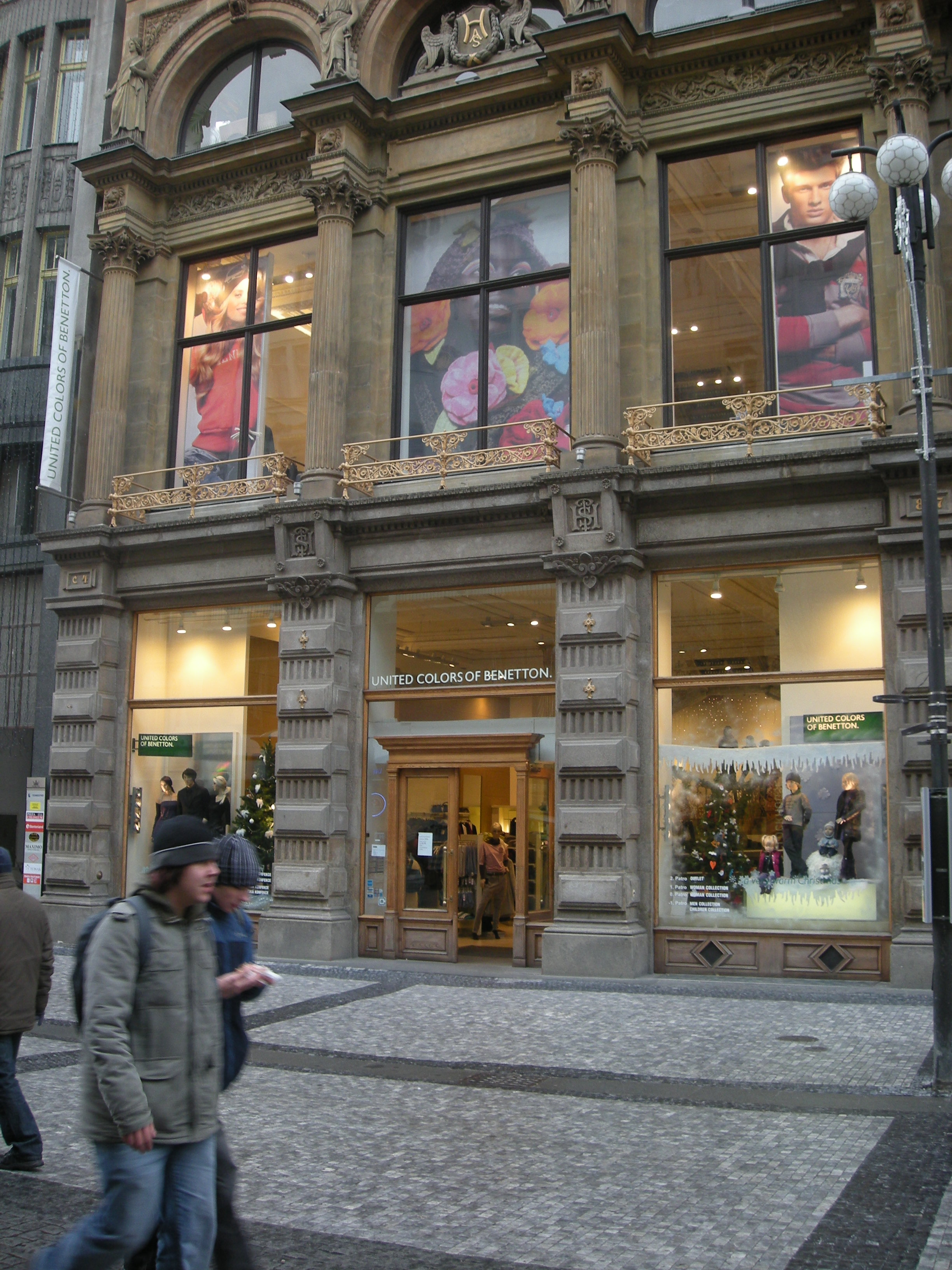
United Colors of Benetton in Prague, Czech Republic

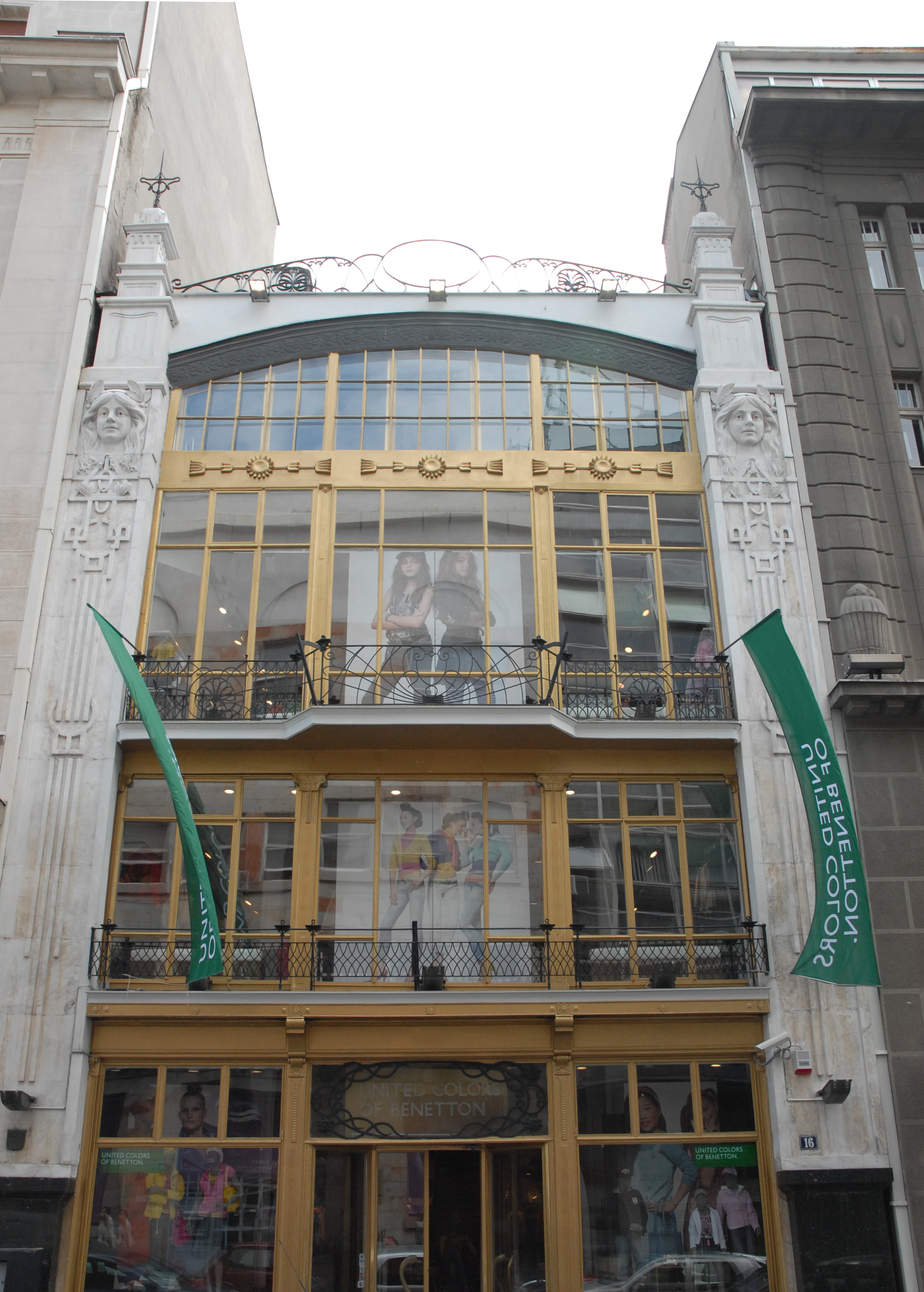
United Colors of Benetton store in Belgrade, Serbia

Benetton Group S.r.l. (Italian: [benetˈton]), trading as United Colors of Benetton, is an Italian global fashion brand based in Ponzano Veneto, Italy, founded in 1965. Benetton Group has a network of about 5,000 stores worldwide. It is a wholly owned subsidiary of the Benetton family's holding company Edizione.

== History ==
In 1965, the Benettons opened their first store in Belluno, in the Veneto region of northern Italy, and three years later, in Paris. The company's core business consists of clothing brands United Colors of Benetton and Sisley.

Benetton was an iconic brand in the 1980s and 1990s, but has since struggled to regain this position. In 2000, it ranked 75th in Interbrand's ranking of the best global brands; however, by 2002, it had dropped out of the list.

In 2012, Benetton Group was delisted from the stock exchange and is now a fully owned subsidiary of the Benetton family company Edizione holding.

In 2017, the group posted a loss of €180 million. Prompted by the heavy losses, Luciano Benetton, who was then 83 years old, returned from retirement as executive chairman for the brand.

Revival efforts also included appointing French designer Jean-Charles de Castelbajac as artistic director and re-appointing photographer Oliviero Toscani. As of 2020, United Colors of Benetton had 1,500 employees and used 25,000 workers through subcontractors. In March 2020, Massimo Renon was named CEO of the company.

On May 25, 2024, Luciano Benetton announced that the group had a loss of €100 million and accused Renon and other executives of mismanagement.

Following Renon's departure, in 2024 Claudio Sforza was appointed CEO of Benetton Group while Christian Coco became president.

In 2025 it was announced that more than 418 stores will close. 180 of 418 were already closed since 2024.

== Marketing ==
Benetton is known for its innovative and often controversial advertising campaigns. In 1982, Benetton hired Oliviero Toscani as creative director, marking a shift from conventional fashion promotion to raising awareness of global social issues. In 1984, Toscani photographed the first multiracial ad for the brand, and by 1989, he had refocused Benetton's advertising strategy under the "United Colors of Benetton" slogan.

The company's large-scale billboard ads depicted a variety of subjects intended to provoke debate. One featured the deathbed photograph of a man (AIDS activist David Kirby) dying from AIDS, used in a 1992 Benetton campaign during the height of the AIDS crisis in the US. Another showed a bloodied, unwashed newborn baby with umbilical cord still attached. This ad prompted roughly 650 complaints to the British Advertising Standards Authority, which noted in its 1991 annual report that it had "attracted more complaints than we have ever previously known." Other images addressed the issues of race, including a black stallion mating with a white mare, a light-skinned girl with blond hair hugging a dark-skinned boy whose hair was styled into devil horns, and a black woman breastfeeding a white child.

In 2000, Benetton was included in the reference publication Guinness World Records for the "Most Controversial Campaign".

In November 2011, Benetton created the UNHATE Foundation, launching a worldwide communication campaign described as an invitation to leaders and citizens of the world to combat the "culture of hatred". Benetton claimed the campaign was created to serve as its corporate social responsibility strategy. The UNHATE poster series uses altered images of political and religious leaders, such as then-President of the United States Barack Obama and Hugo Chávez, then President of Venezuela, kissing each other. Following Vatican protests, Benetton removed an ad purportedly showing Pope Benedict XVI kissing Ahmed Mohamed el Tayeb, the imam of Egypt's Al Azhar mosque.

Benetton won the Press Grand Prix at the 2012 Cannes Ad festival for its Unhate campaign.

In November 2017, Benetton launched a campaign in collaboration with Devbhumi, a company owned by rural women from India's remote Uttarakhand region. The initiative claimed to have empowered more than 6,000 rural women artisans in India.

In 2019, Benetton Group announced it would be hosting one of the four days of talks and presentations which makes up the 88th annual International Wool Textile Organisation (IWTO) congress.

== Sport and sponsorship ==
Benetton Group entered Formula One as a sponsor of Tyrrell in 1983, then Alfa Romeo in 1984; this arrangement was extended to both Alfa and Toleman in 1985. Benetton Formula Ltd. was formed at the end of 1985 when the Toleman and Spirit teams were sold to the Benetton family. The team saw its greatest success under Flavio Briatore, who managed the team from 1990 to 1997. Michael Schumacher won his first Drivers' Championships with the team in 1994 and 1995, and the team won their only Constructors' title in 1995. From 1996, the team raced under an Italian licence, although it continued to be based, like Toleman, in Oxfordshire in England. The team was bought by Renault for US$120 million in 2000 and was rebranded Renault F1 in 2002.

In 1979, Benetton first sponsored their (then amateur) local rugby team, A.S. Rugby Treviso. Benetton Rugby has since become a major force in Italian rugby, with 11 league titles and supplying many players to the national team. Benetton Group was the main sponsor and majority owner of basketball club Pallacanestro Treviso (then known as Benetton Basket) during its golden era from 1982 to 2012, when the club won 17 Italian titles and 2 European cups. Benetton Group has been also main sponsor of Sisley Volley (1987–2012).

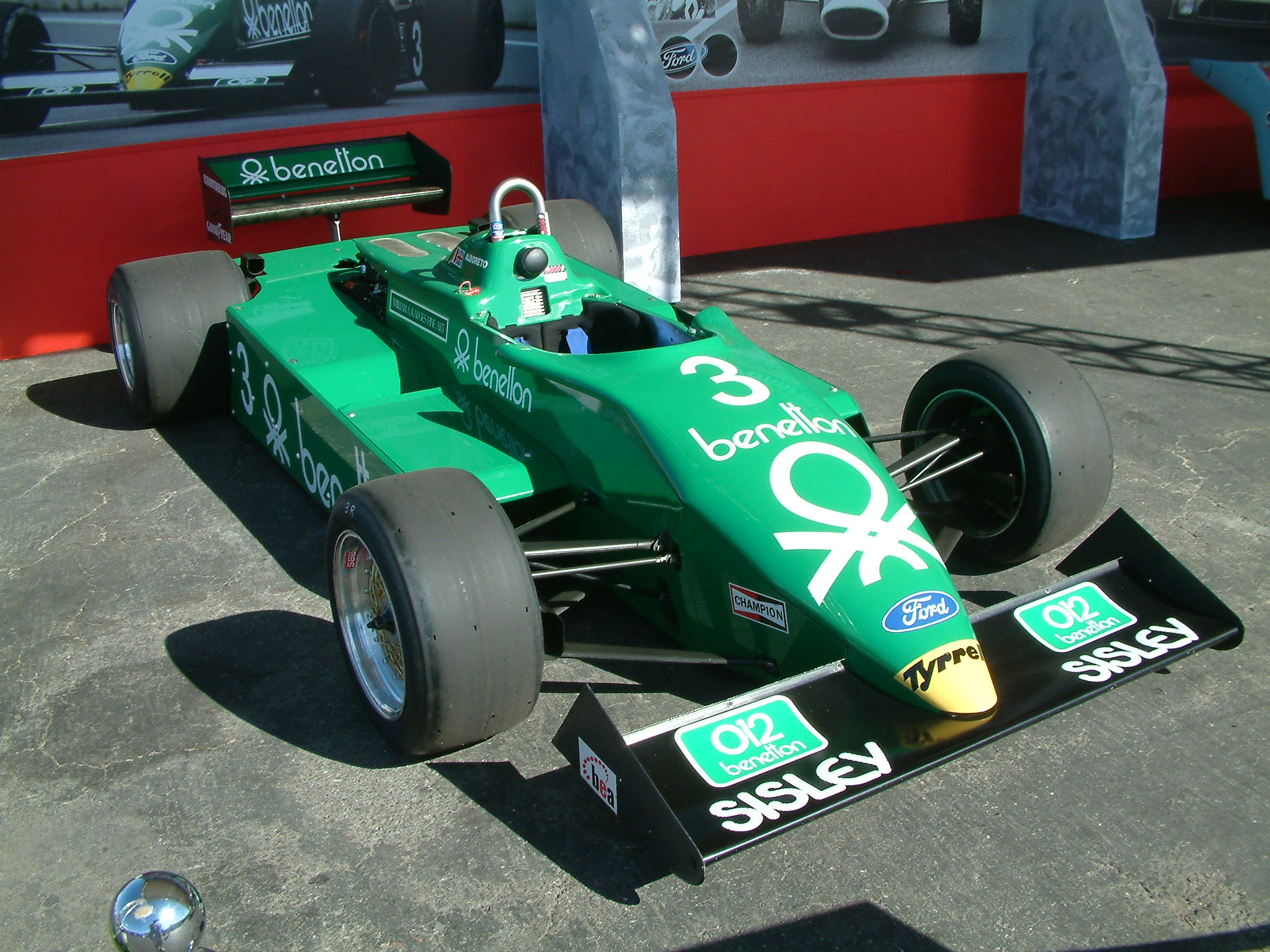
The 1983 season Tyrrell 011, showing the company's logo at the time

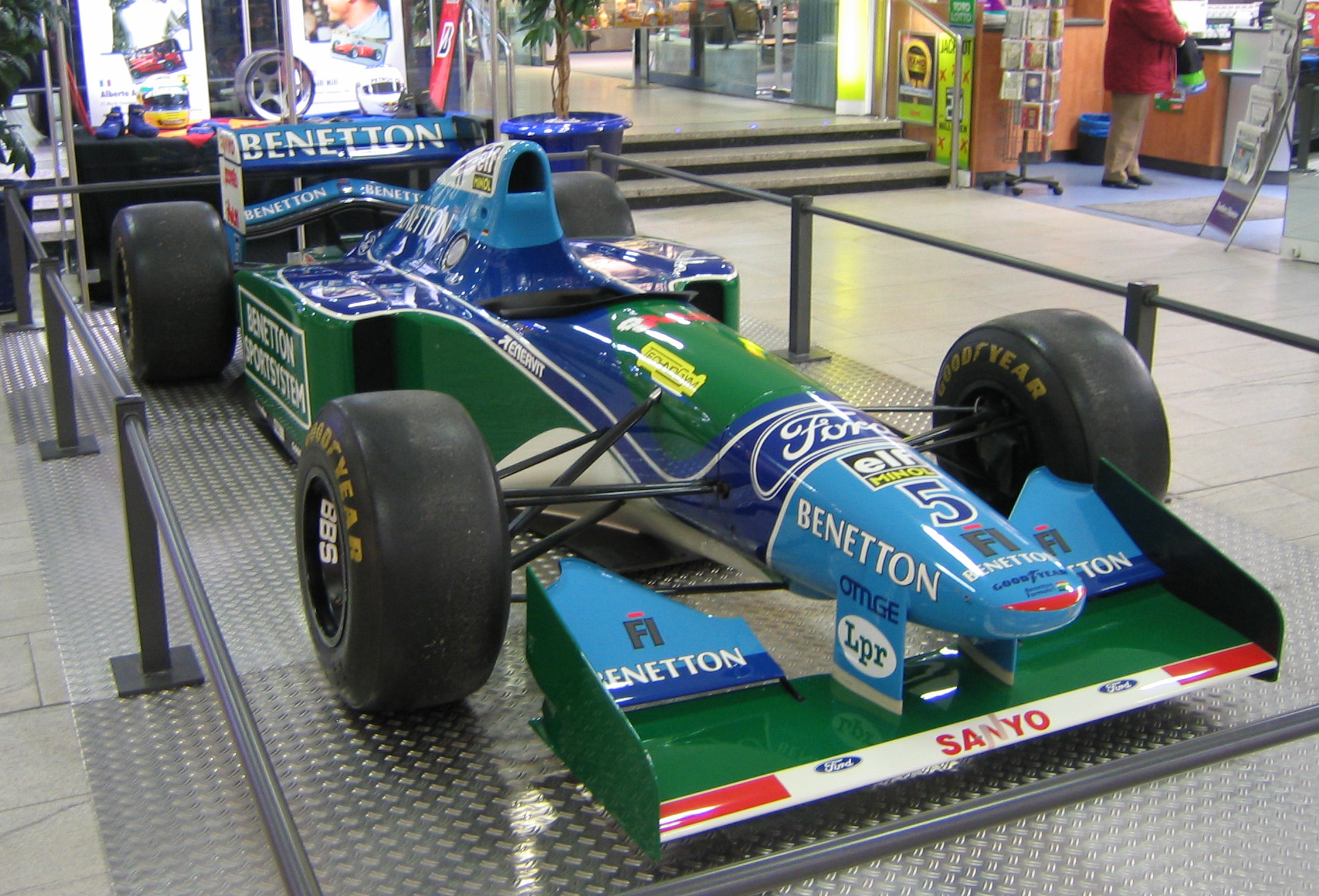
Schumacher's B194 of the 1994 season

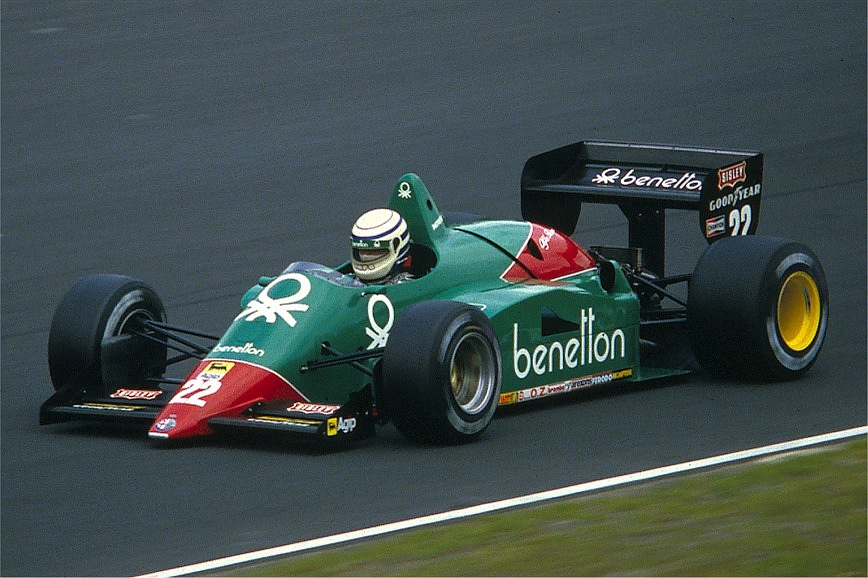
Riccardo Patrese's Alfa Romeo Benetton 185T

== Criticisms ==
In 1991, Edizone Holding International, a Benetton subsidiary, bought Compañía de Tierras del Sud Argentino S. A. and became the largest private landowner in Argentina after taking over the land the company had inherited from the 19th century Conquest of the Desert. Benetton has faced criticism, particularly from Mapuche organizations, over its ownership and management of traditional Mapuche lands in Patagonia. In 1997, Benetton invested in a museum in Leleque which presented the Mapuche as migrants from Chile, which was interpreted as an attempt to diminish the Mapuche's traditional claims. The Curiñanco-Nahuelquir family was evicted from their land in 2002 following Benetton's claim to it, but the land was restored in 2007. The company published a position statement regarding the Mapuche in Patagonia in 2012. Protests and occupations began again in 2015. Activist Santiago Maldonado was last seen being evicted by the Argentine National Gendarmerie from the disputed area in August 2017. His body was found two months later.

Benetton aroused suspicion when they considered using RFID tracking chips on clothes to monitor inventory. A boycott site alleges the tracking chips "can be read from a distance and used to monitor the people wearing them." Issues of consumer privacy were raised, and the plan was shelved. Benetton's position on RFID technology is also available on their website.

PETA launched a boycott campaign against Benetton for buying wool from farmers who practiced mulesing. Benetton has since agreed to buy nonmulesed wool and has further urged the wool industry to adopt the PETA and Australian Wool Growers Association agreement to end mulesing. Benetton's position statement on the mulesing controversy is available on their website.

=== Building collapse at Savar ===
On 24 April 2013, the eight-storey Rana Plaza commercial building collapsed outside Dhaka. It housed one of the factories in which Benetton clothing was made. At least 1,130 people died. Benetton first denied reports linking production of their clothing at the factory, but clothes and documents linked to Benetton were discovered at the disaster site. Of the 29 brands identified as having sourced products from the Rana Plaza factories, only nine attended meetings held in November 2013 to agree a proposal on compensation to the victims. Several companies refused to sign including Walmart, Carrefour, Bonmarché, Mango, Auchan and Kik. The agreement was signed by Primark, Loblaw, Bonmarche and El Corte Ingles. A year after the collapse, Benetton faced international protests after failing to pay any compensation to the Rana Plaza Donors Trust Fund. Protests included shutting down Benetton's flagship Oxford Street store in London.

In April 2015, Benetton Group announced that it has doubled compensation for Rana Plaza victims recommended by independent assessors (PWC AND WRAP) and applied the principles of the Accord on Fire and Building Safety to global suppliers. Benetton's engagement for Bangladesh is available on their website.

=== Position on the Russian invasion of Ukraine ===
According to a study by Yale University, which analyzes the exit of foreign companies from the Russian market, Benetton group received the worst grade "F", which indicates that the company has not taken any steps to exit the Russian market and operates there with "business as usual". Meanwhile, the Changing Markets Foundation found evidence that the Benetton group uses Russian oil for its polyester products and is the only company investigated that does both: uses Russian oil for its products and remains on the Russian market.

== See also ==
- Benetton family
- Colors (magazine)
