= Mundys =

Italian holding company

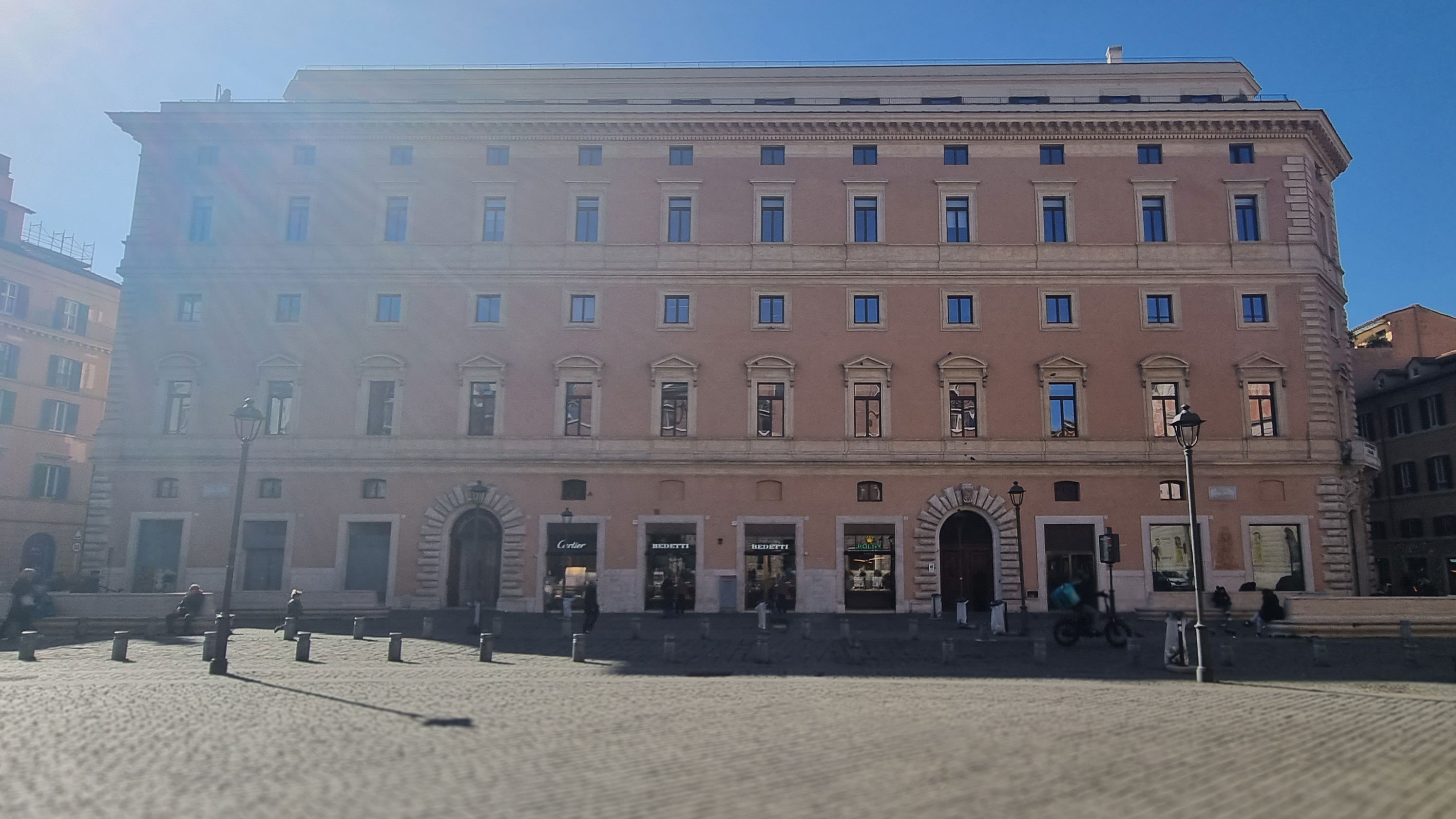
- Headquarters in Rome, Italy
- Formerly: Atlantia
- Type: S.p.A.
- Industry: Transportation
- Headquarters: Rome, Lazio, Italy
- Key people: Alessandro Benetton (President); Giampiero Massolo (Vice-president); Andrea Mangoni (CEO and General Director)
- Products: Airport, Sustainable transport, Intelligent transportation system, Controlled-access highway
- Revenue: €9.6 billion (2025)
- Operating income: €6.4 billion (2021)
- Net income: €1,2 billion (2025)
- Number of employees: 24,000 (2025)
- Parent: Edizione
- Subsidiaries: Abertis, Aeroporti di Roma, Telepass, Nice Côte d'Azur Airport, Grupo Costanera, Yunex Traffic
- Website: www.mundys.com/en/

Mundys (Italian: [ˈmundis]; formerly Atlantia Italian: [aˈtlantja]) is an Italian holding company active in the motorway and airport infrastructure and mobility-related services industry, operating tolling services in 24 countries, including 11 for motorway and airport infrastructure concessions (France, Italy, Poland, United Kingdom and Spain in Europe and worldwide in Argentina, Brazil, Chile, Colombia, India and Puerto Rico).

The group manages 9,400 km (5,800 mi) of toll motorways, Fiumicino and Ciampino airports in Italy and the three airstrips of Nice, Cannes-Mandelieu and Saint Tropez in France with more than 60 million passengers a year.

It was listed on the Borsa Italiana until December 2022.

The main shareholders are: Edizione (a company of the Benetton family), Blackstone and the CRT Foundation.

Atlantia changed its name to Mundys S.p.A. on 15 March 2023.

== History ==
=== 1950–2000: Foundation and consolidation ===
Founded in 1950 as Autostrade, when the company Concessioni e Autostrade S.p.A. was created, it aimed to give a significant contribution, cooperating with other Groups, to the post-war reconstruction of Italy.

By the first agreement between ANAS signed in 1956, the companies were committed in co-financing, building and managing the Autostrada Del Sole, between Milan and Naples, inaugurated in 1964. Between 1962 and 1968, the company was granted the concession for the construction and operation of other motorways. In 1982 it was acquired by Italstat and in 1987 Autostrade Concessioni e Costruzioni S.p.A. was listed on Borsa Valori of Milan.

In 1999, the Autostrade company was privatized. The consortium led by Schemaventotto S.p.A. (Edition of Benetton Group 60%, Fondazione CRT with 13.33%, Acesa Italia with 12.83%, Assicurazioni Generali and Unicredito Italiano both at 6.67% and Brisa International SGPS SA with 0.50%) and another one pulled by the Australian bank Macquarie, who retreated at last, were the other groups in the line.

With the 30% of the capital, Schemaventotto S.p.A. takes over the IRI Group, which was the reference shareholder. They did the only binding purchase offer for the share package paying IRI €5.05 billion; the remaining 56% of the shareholding held by IRI was floated on the stock market by a public sale offer which led to obtain 8.75 billion lire, for a total sum for IRI of 13,800 billion lire.

In January 2003 Newco28 made a tender offer, through a leveraged buyout operation: they found the liquidity necessary for the acquisition using the system credit and, consequently, the debt was transferred from Newco28 to Autostrade, following a merger by incorporation.

2003 was marked by a massive reorganisation of the group, the concession activities were separated from non-motorway activities and Autostrade per l'Italia S.p.A., a subsidiary of Autostrade (then Atlantia S.p.A.), was established.

=== 2000–2021: Company renamed Atlantia S.p.A. ===
During 2005, a process of geographical diversification began with the acquisition of the management of approximately 2,000 km (1,200 mi) of toll motorways in Brazil, Chile, India, and Poland. In 2007, the board of directors approved the change of name into Atlantia S.p.A.

In 2013, the merger by incorporation of Gemina S.p.A., the majority shareholder of ADR (Aeroporti di Roma) into Atlantia, was concluded, with the consequent aggregation of a second core business in addition to the motorway concessions. Atlantia's acquisition of Aéroports de la Côte d’Azur, the company that controls the airports of Nice, Cannes-Mandelieu and Saint Tropez, consolidated the Group's presence in the airport sector.

During the summer of 2017, Atlantia declared the intention to make a tender offer on all the issued shares of Abertis Infraestructuras, and in October 2017 the Comision Nacional del Mercado de Valores authorised this. Just over a week later the Hochtief – Acs Group launched a bid against the tender offer to acquire the Spanish company. In March 2018 Atlantia and Hochtief-Acs reached an agreement for a joint offer for the control of Abertis, which was finalised in October 2018. To acquire 98.7% of the capital of Abertis the parties invested €16.5 billion. In March 2018 Atlantia S.p.A. bought 15.49% of Getlink, the company that controls the Channel Tunnel.

As of December 2019, Atlantia had an EBITDA of 5.7 billion euros, financial debts for 36.7 bln (in respect of 38.8 bln of the previous year) and net profits for 136 million euros (in respect of 775 mln declared in 2018).

In June 2021, Atlantia sold its 88% stake in ASPI (comprising its largest Italian motorways) to the newly formed Holding Reti Autostradali S.p.A. (HRA).

With regard to sustainability ratings, as of July 2014 Atlantia had a low rating from Standard Ethics Aei of 'E' on a scale of F to EEE within the SE Italian Index. It was further reduced to "E-" on 10 October 2019 in relation to the management following the Morandi bridge collapse, and was then finally suspended by press release on 22 September 2022.

Over the years, the company has received several awards in the area of sustainable development, earning an A rating in 2022 from the Carbon Disclosure Project (Cdp), a score of 73 from Moody's and an improvement in its rating from 'BBB' to 'AA' in the MSCI ESG index. The company was also included in Bloomberg's Gender Equality Index (GEI) in 2022.

=== 2022: Voluntary Public Tender Offer and Delisting ===
At the beginning of April 2022, Spanish financier Florentino Perez (shareholder of 50% minus one share in Atlantia's majority-owned company Abertis) together with the two private equity funds Global Infrastructure Partners and Brookfield Infrastructure Partners, considered launching a takeover bid (OPA) for Atlantia. In order to preserve the group's integrity and Italian identity, the Benetton family, in alliance with the U.S. fund Blackstone Inc, announced a defensive takeover bid in mid-April, so as to secure the group from possible financial counteroffensives, such as the one promoted by Perez.

The 19 billion takeover bid for Atlantia at 23 euros per share was launched on 10 October 2022. The offer was launched by Schema Alfa, a special purpose vehicle controlled by Schemaquarantadue S.p.A., which is 65% owned by the holding company Edizione (chaired by Alessandro Benetton) and 35% owned by the American private equity fund Blackstone.

The takeover bid was launched on Atlantia's total shares, that is, 66.90% of its capital, with the exception of the 33.10% stake held by Edizione. The buy-out ended in November 2022, with Schema Alfa holding 95.933% of Atlantia, excluding treasury shares.

As a result, the holding company's new shareholding structure is made up of Edizione for about 57%, Blackstone for about 37.8% (through an open-end fund), and, finally, Fondazione CRT for the remaining shares.

Atlantia left Piazza Affari on 9 December 2022, with the official delisting of the company from the Italian stock exchange after 35 years.

== Group Structure ==
=== Shareholding ===
The shareholding structure is as follows:

- Edizione S.p.A. (Through Sintonia S.p.A): 57%
- Blackstone: 37.8%
- Fondazione Cassa di Risparmio di Torino: 5.2%

=== Subsidiaries ===
The group's companies are:

- Abertis (50%)
- Aeroporti di Roma S.p.A. (99%)
- Telepass S.p.A. (51%)
- Yunex Traffic (100%)
- Aeroporto di Bologna
- Aéroports de la Côte d'Azur (64%)
- Sanef (100%)

=== Main non-financial holdings ===
- Getlink (Eurotunnel, Paris) 15.49%

== Controversies ==
=== 2018: Morandi Bridge collapse ===
On 14 August 2018, the Atlantia managed Morandi Bridge collapsed causing the death of 43 people.

In 2018, the net debt level of Atlantia and the subsidiary Autostrade per l'Italia, had raised concerns from journalists and rating agencies.

== See also ==
- Aeroporti di Roma
- Nice Côte d'Azur Airport
- Cannes – Mandelieu Airport
- Telepass
- Abertis
