= Ponzano Veneto =

- Comune
- Comune di Ponzano Veneto
- Location within Italy Location within Veneto
- Coordinates: 45°43′N 12°13′E
- Country: Italy
- Region: Veneto
- Province: Treviso (TV)
- Frazioni: Merlengo, Paderno (municipal seat), Ponzano Veneto

Government
  - Mayor: Monia Bianchin

Area
  - Total: 22.1 km^{2} (8.5 sq mi)

Population (31 December 2008)
  - Total: 12,012
  - Density: 544/km^{2} (1,410/sq mi)
- Time zone: UTC+1 (CET)
  - Summer (DST): UTC+2 (CEST)
- Postal code: 31050
- Dialing code: 0422
- Website: Official website

Ponzano Veneto is a comune (municipality) in the Province of Treviso in the Italian region Veneto, located about 30 kilometres (19 mi) north of Venice and about 6 kilometres (4 mi) northwest of Treviso.

Ponzano Veneto borders the following municipalities: Paese, Povegliano, Treviso, Villorba, Volpago del Montello.

Ponzano Veneto is home to the headquarters of United Colors of Benetton, one of the biggest Italian fashion houses and clothing labels in the world. The headquarters of the company is situated in the Villa Minelli, which was bought by the group in 1969 and became the main headquarters of the company in the 1980s.

== History ==
In 1807, Ponzano, Paderno, and Merlengo—three frazioni (subdivisions) located a few kilometers North of the city of Treviso—formed the Comune di Ponzano, which then became Ponzano Veneto in 1869.

It is likely that there was some kind of inhabitation in antiquity, due to the fact that the area that is now Ponzano Veneto was crossed by via Postumia, the Roman road connecting Genoa and Aquileia.
