= Benetton Formula =

Former motor racing team

Benetton
- Full name: Benetton Formula Ltd.
- Base: Witney, England, UK (1986–1991); Enstone, England, UK (1992–2001)
- Noted staff: Flavio Briatore; Rocco Benetton; Ross Brawn; Frank Dernie; Mike Gascoyne; Nigel Stepney; Pat Symonds; Steve Matchett; David Richards; Peter Collins; Rory Byrne; Nikolas Tombazis; Willem Toet; Pat Fry; Nick Wirth; John Barnard; Tad Czapski; Philip J. Henderson; Greg Field
- Noted drivers: (Italy) Teo Fabi (Austria) Gerhard Berger (Belgium) Thierry Boutsen (Italy) Alessandro Nannini (United Kingdom) Johnny Herbert (Italy) Emanuele Pirro (Brazil) Nelson Piquet (Brazil) Roberto Moreno (Germany) Michael Schumacher (United Kingdom) Martin Brundle (Italy) Riccardo Patrese (Netherlands) Jos Verstappen (Finland) JJ Lehto (France) Jean Alesi (Austria) Alexander Wurz (Italy) Giancarlo Fisichella (United Kingdom) Jenson Button
- Previous name: Toleman Motorsport
- Next name: Renault F1 Team

Formula One World Championship career
- First entry: 1986 Brazilian Grand Prix
- Races entered: 260
- Engines: BMW, Ford, Renault, Playlife
- Constructors' Championships: 1 (1995)
- Drivers' Championships: 2 (1994, 1995)
- Race victories: 27
- Podiums: 102
- Points: 851.5 (861.5) (Note: Extra 10 points are Michael Schumacher's points from 1995 Brazilian Grand Prix which were not counted towards 1995 World Constructors' Championship.)
- Pole positions: 15
- Fastest laps: 36
- Final entry: 2001 Japanese Grand Prix

Benetton Formula Limited., commonly referred to simply as Benetton, was a Formula One constructor that participated from 1986 to 2001. The team was owned by the Benetton family who run a worldwide chain of clothing stores. In 2000, the team was purchased by Renault, but competed as Benetton for the 2000 and 2001 seasons. In 2002, the team became Renault. The Benetton Formula team was chaired by Alessandro Benetton from 1988 to 1998.

== Origins ==
The Benetton Group entered Formula One as a sponsor company for constructor Tyrrell in 1983, then Alfa Romeo in 1984 and 1985 and finally Toleman in 1985. Toleman had struggled in 1985, missing the first three races of the season and being forced to only enter one car for the following six races, as a result of a dispute with tyre suppliers. Teo Fabi had taken a pole position for Toleman at the German Grand Prix; however, the team would score no points during the season, with poor reliability causing a Toleman car to see the chequered flag only twice out of 20 total entries. Benetton Formula Limited was formed in 1985 when the Toleman team was sold to the Benetton family.

== Racing history ==
=== BMW (1986) and Ford (1987–1994) era ===
==== Beginnings (1986–1987) ====
Toleman had already developed the TG186, their planned chassis for the 1986 season. This was renamed the Benetton B186 after the change in ownership. Benetton's first season in Formula One also came with a change in engine supply, with Toleman's Hart engines being replaced with that of a large car manufacturer, the powerful BMW M12. Teo Fabi was retained as a driver and Piercarlo Ghinzani was replaced by Gerhard Berger, who joined from Arrows.

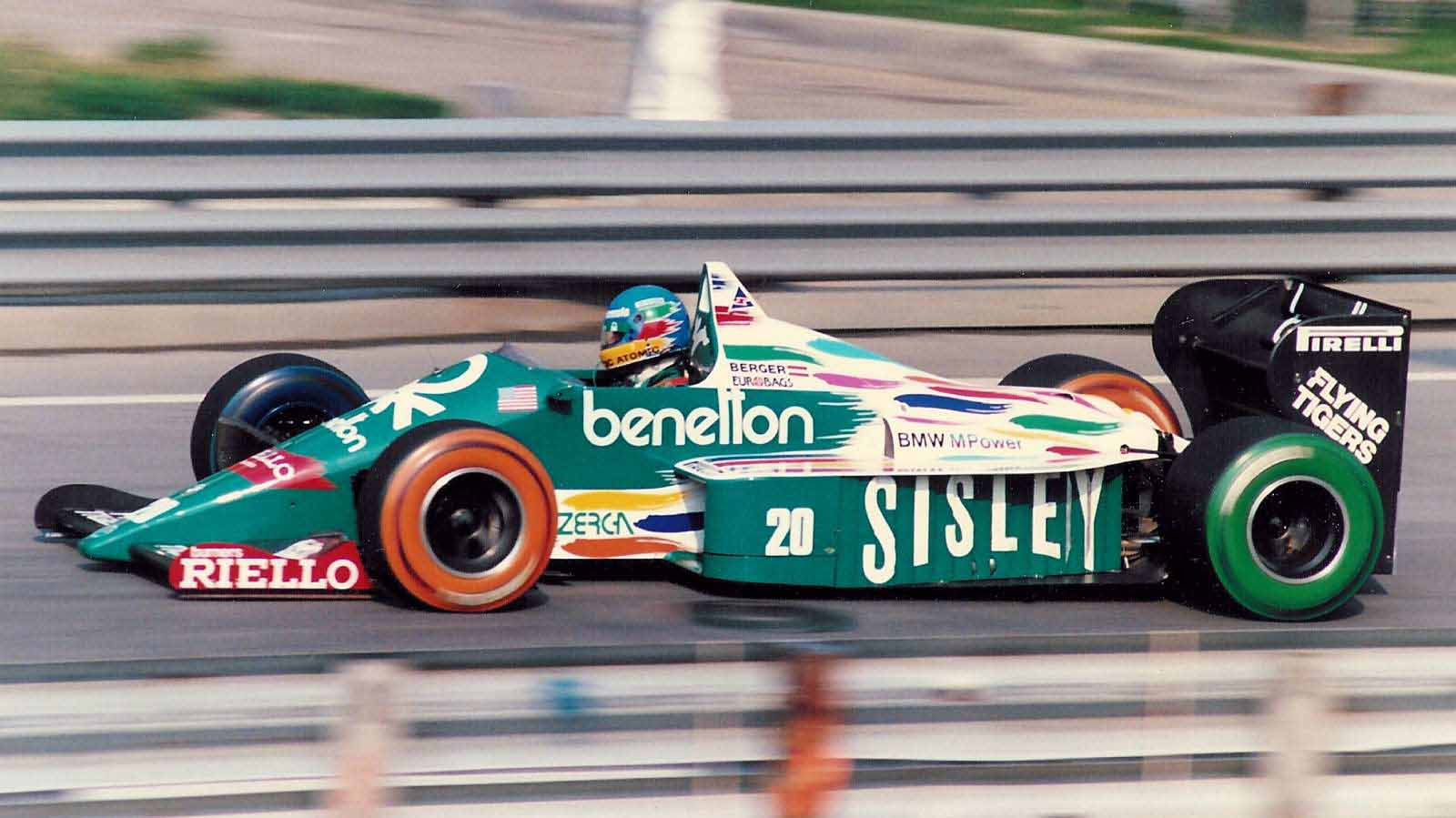
Gerhard Berger driving the Benetton B186 at the 1986 Detroit Grand Prix

The B186 demonstrated its pace throughout the season, with Berger securing the team's first podium finish at Imola and a front-row start in Belgium. Fabi claimed two consecutive pole positions in Austria and Italy, before Berger achieved the Witney-based team's first victory in Mexico, almost half a minute ahead of his nearest competitor. Despite the impressive underlying pace, the B186 suffered from severe unreliability. The team recorded nineteen retirements, with eight consecutively for Fabi (including from his two pole positions). Benetton ended the season 6th in the championship with 19 points.

Berger left the team for Ferrari at the end of 1986 and was replaced at Benetton by his former Arrows teammate Thierry Boutsen. BMW, which had supplied three teams in 1986, scaled back its operation to supply only Brabham in 1987. With the Haas Lola team folding at the end of 1986, Benetton was able to take over its factory supply of turbocharged Ford engines. The B187 suffered with engine trouble at the start of the season, but became more consistent mid-season after reducing the effect of the turbocharger, taking numerous 4th and 5th place finishes as well as two 3rd places in Austria and Australia. Benetton ended the season 5th in the championship with 28 points.

==== Rise (1988–1990) ====
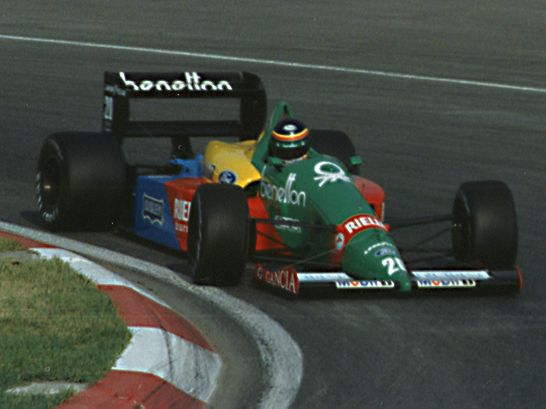
Thierry Boutsen driving the Benetton B188 at the 1988 Canadian Grand Prix

Fabi was dropped for the 1988 season in favour of Minardi driver Alessandro Nannini, ending Fabi's Formula One career. The B188 became the team's first naturally-aspirated car as Ford wished to concentrate development in light of the upcoming ban on turbocharged engines. The B188 was once again an improvement on its predecessor, suffering almost half the number of retirements and claiming seven podium finishes, all 3rd places. Boutsen had finished 3rd in Belgium, however both Benettons were disqualified from the race after the season had concluded for fuel irregularities. The team finished the season 3rd in the championship with 39 points.

For 1989, Boutsen left Benetton to join Williams and was replaced by rookie Johnny Herbert. The new engine developed by Ford for the B189 was not ready for the start of the season, and the previous year's engine did not fit in the new car. The team therefore had no choice but to continue using the B188. Despite this setback, the B188 still proved competitive, with Nannini claiming a podium finish at Imola. Prior to making his Formula One debut, Herbert was involved in a serious crash in Formula 3000 that broke both his legs. Despite achieving some impressive results, including 4th place in his first race, he was dropped by the team after failing to qualify for the Canadian Grand Prix as it became clear he had still not fully recovered. He was replaced by rookie and McLaren test driver Emanuele Pirro. The B189 was finally ready to compete at the following race. Nannini would go on to achieve Benetton's first victory since 1986 at the Japanese Grand Prix after Ayrton Senna was disqualified. Pirro was only able to secure a single points finish in his ten races with the team, taking 5th place in Australia. Benetton ended the season 4th in the championship with 39 points.

Prior to the 1990 season, the team management was fired and businessman Flavio Briatore was appointed team manager by the Benetton family. Pirro was dropped in favour of three-time world champion Nelson Piquet, who had left the struggling Lotus team. Benetton used a modified B189 before introducing the B190 at the third race of the season. 1990 proved to be the team's most successful to date, with Piquet winning the final two races of the season and the team achieving six other podium finishes. Tragedy would befall the team late into the season after Nannini lost his right forearm in a helicopter crash. His arm was re-attached but the injuries ended his Formula One career. EuroBrun driver Roberto Moreno had become available after the backmarker team pulled out of the sport, and so he was hired as Nannini's replacement. The next race in Japan marked Benetton's first ever 1–2 finish, as well as Moreno's first and only career podium. Benetton ended the season 3rd in the championship with 71 points.

==== Early Schumacher years (1991–1993) ====
A new title sponsor was acquired for 1991 in the form of American cigarette brand Camel, which had previously appeared as a minor sponsor on Benetton cars. The 1991 season was less successful for Benetton. An upgraded B190 was used for the first two races of the season before the B191 made its debut at the San Marino Grand Prix. Piquet achieved an unexpected victory in Canada after Nigel Mansell retired on the final lap, but two other 3rd place finishes were the only podium places the team would achieve in 1991. Benetton sought a young driver for the team's future, and believed neither Moreno nor the ageing Piquet could fill this role. After Michael Schumacher had impressed in his debut for Jordan at the Belgian Grand Prix, he was hired by Benetton for the following race in place of Moreno. Jordan protested the move in the British courts, but they found in favour of Benetton.

For the 1992 season, Tom Walkinshaw Racing acquired a 35% stake in Benetton, with Tom Walkinshaw and Ross Brawn brought in to run the team's engineering operations. The team also moved its base of operations from Witney, Oxfordshire to a new factory close to the nearby village of Enstone. Piquet had retired from Formula One, and was replaced by experienced Brabham driver Martin Brundle. Benetton's new car was once again delayed, with the team using an upgraded B191 for the first three races of the season in which Schumacher achieved two podium finishes. The B192 was a marked improvement, with eleven more podium finishes including a victory at Spa-Francorchamps, the first of Schumacher's career. Benetton ended the season 3rd in the championship with 91 points.

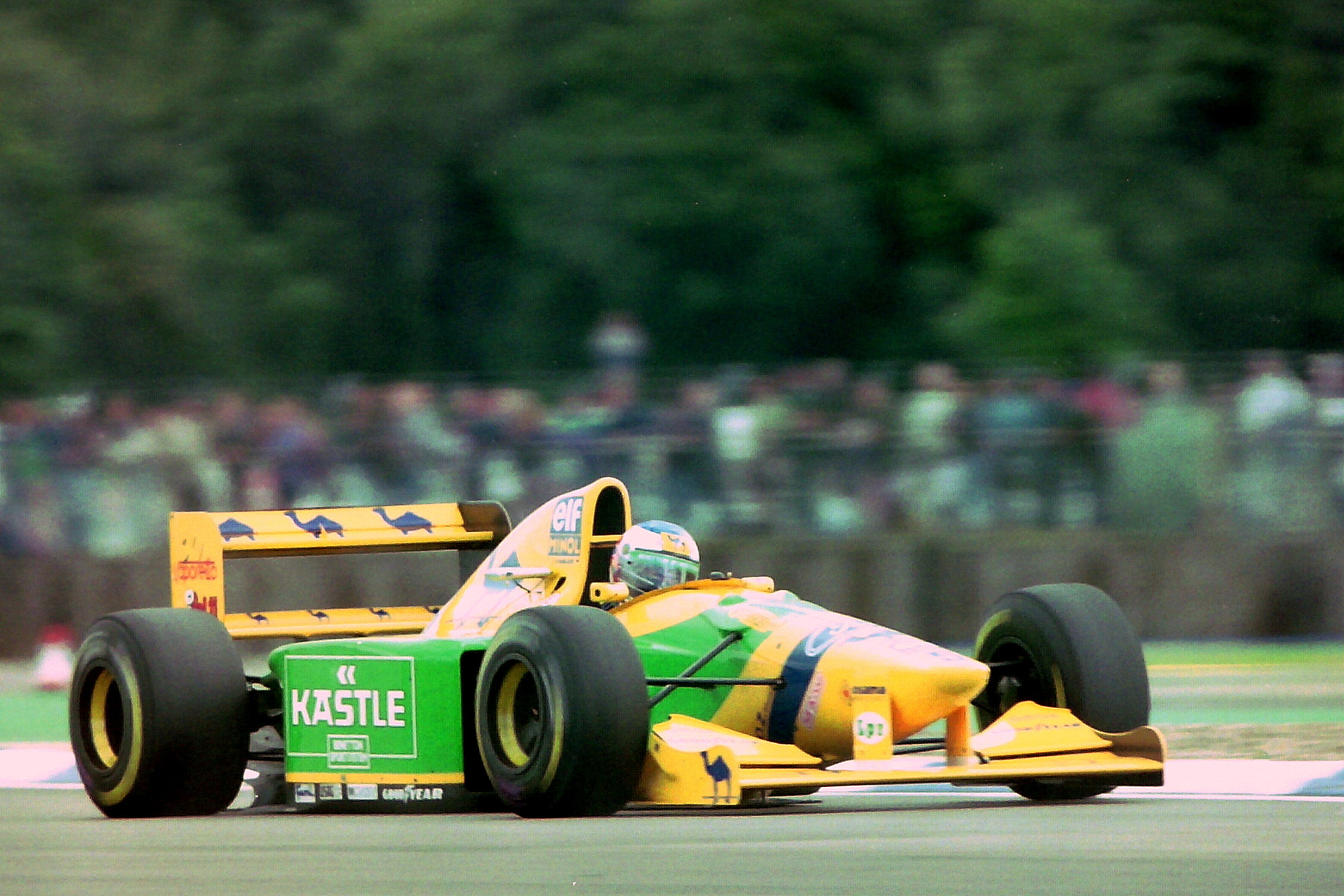
Michael Schumacher driving the Benetton B193 at the 1993 British Grand Prix

Brundle was unexpectedly dropped for 1993 in favour of veteran Riccardo Patrese, who had left Williams. The B193 was similar in competitiveness to its predecessor, taking a single victory in the hands of Schumacher at the Portuguese Grand Prix and finishing 3rd in the championship for the fourth time in the team's history. Benetton achieved ten other podium finishes during the season. Despite these impressive results and improvements in the team's performance in 1992 and 1993, Benetton were not able to provide Schumacher with a car to challenge for the world championship, and were outclassed by the dominant Williams team.

==== Championship years (1994–1995) ====
Camel was replaced as the team's title sponsor for 1994 by Japanese cigarette brand Mild Seven. This meant Benetton adopted sky blue as the main car colour. Patrese retired from Formula One, ending what was the longest career in the sport's history. He was replaced by Sauber driver JJ Lehto. However, Lehto was injured whilst testing the B194 prior to the start of the season and Benetton's test driver Jos Verstappen was brought up to replace him. The B194 was dominant in the hands of Schumacher, winning six of the first seven races including the tragedy-marred 1994 San Marino Grand Prix that claimed the life of Ayrton Senna and taking Benetton's first pole positions since 1986. Verstappen and Lehto were less successful. Verstappen retired from his first two races after accidents. Lehto was declared fit for the San Marino Grand Prix, but would only score a single point in the following four races and was replaced again by Verstappen for the French Grand Prix onwards.

Schumacher finished 2nd at the British Grand Prix, but was deemed to have overtaken Damon Hill on the formation lap and then ignored black flags. He was disqualified from the results after the race, and later handed a two-race ban. At the German Grand Prix, Verstappen's B194 burst into flames after being showered with fuel during his pit stop. He escaped with minor burns and returned to score two consecutive podiums at the following races, the first of his career. Another disqualification came for Schumacher after he finished 1st at the Belgian Grand Prix; his car was measured as having an illegal amount of wear on its skid block. His two-race ban was served at the following two races, during which Lehto returned to the team as a replacement. In an attempt to win the constructors' championship, Benetton replaced Verstappen with the more experienced Johnny Herbert for the final two races of the season, marking his return to the team. This was ultimately unsuccessful after Herbert retired from both races. Despite Benetton losing the constructors' championship to Williams, Schumacher won his first world title after colliding with championship rival Hill at the final race in Australia, taking out both drivers.

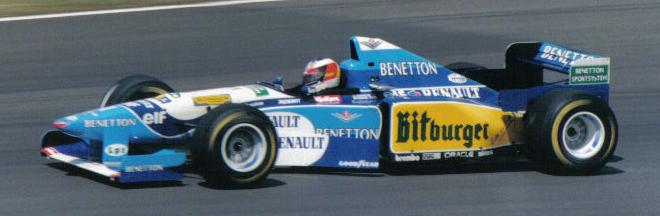
Schumacher driving the Benetton B195 at the 1995 British Grand Prix

==== 1994 cheating controversy ====
During the 1994 season, some rival teams claimed Benetton had found a way to violate the FIA-imposed ban on electronic aids, including traction control and launch control. On investigation, the FIA discovered "start sequence" (launch control) software in the Benetton B194 cars, and a variety of illegal software in rival teams' cars as well. FIA had no evidence the software was ever used, so teams found with the software received little to no punishment. No traction control software was found to be in the Benetton cars, however. Flavio Briatore, Benetton's chief in 1994, said in 2001 that "Our only mistake was that at the time we were too young and people were suspicious".

=== Renault works era (1995–1997) ===
After eight years of Ford power, Benetton switched to full-works Renault V10 engines for 1995 and thus Ford switched allegiances to then-youngest Formula One constructor Sauber. Herbert was retained alongside Schumacher, whilst test driver Verstappen was loaned to the struggling Simtek team. Schumacher was initially critical of the new B195, claiming that it was difficult to control. The car was outclassed by the Williams FW17 in the early season, with the team's poor performance culminating in Schumacher crashing out from pole position at Imola. However, setup changes at the following race in Spain improved Schumacher's performance in the car. He went on to dominate the remainder of the season, taking nine wins from seventeen races in total and claiming his second world title. Herbert took his first career podium in Spain and then went on to win the British and Italian Grands Prix. This combined effort won Benetton its first constructors' championship, ending Williams' three-year reign. Herbert later claimed the team failed to provide him with equal equipment and accused them of favouring Schumacher.

==== Decline (1996–1999) ====
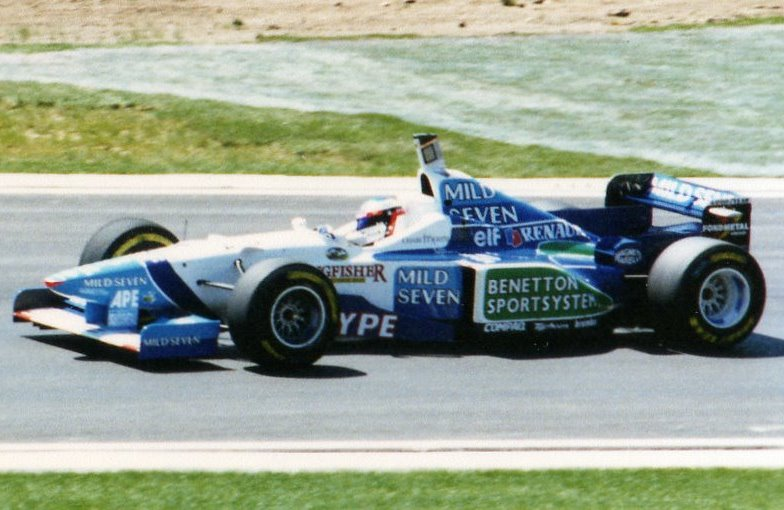
Jean Alesi driving the Benetton B196 during free practice at the 1996 San Marino Grand Prix

Benetton began racing under Italian nationality for the 1996 season, but remained based in the United Kingdom. Despite being contracted to race for Benetton, Schumacher left early to join Ferrari, citing the team's actions in 1994 as his reason for opting out. Herbert was dropped by the team and joined Sauber. Their replacements were Jean Alesi and the returning Gerhard Berger, both of whom had left Ferrari. Williams returned to dominance in 1996 and Schumacher's departure allowed Ferrari to compete for race wins, leaving Benetton struggling. The B196 took ten podium finishes, but the team failed to win a race for the first time since 1988. Alesi and Berger were on course to win the Monaco and German Grands Prix respectively, but both retired late in the closing laps. Benetton finished the season 3rd in the championship with 68 points, less than half as many as in 1995.

By 1997, technical director Ross Brawn and chief designer Rory Byrne, as well as numerous other staff, had left Benetton to join Schumacher at Ferrari. Composites manager, Philip Henderson, who had been with the team since the start also left to help Dan Gurney with his Indy Car team in California. The B197, like its predecessor, struggled to compete with Williams and Ferrari. However, the team still achieved a number of podium finishes over the season. Berger was forced to miss three races due to illness and the death of his father; his replacement was rookie test driver Alexander Wurz. Wurz scored a podium in Britain, only his third race in Formula One. Berger returned for the German Grand Prix, winning the race from pole position in dominant fashion. However, this would turn out to be Benetton's last victory in Formula One, as well as the 10th and final career win for Gerhard Berger. Alesi took pole position in Italy but lost out due to a slow pit stop, finishing 2nd. Benetton ended the season 3rd in the championship with 67 points.

=== Mecachrome-assembled Supertec era (1998–2000) ===
1998 saw numerous changes within the Benetton team. Berger retired from Formula One, and Alesi left to join Sauber. Test driver Wurz was promoted to a full-time seat, partnering Giancarlo Fisichella who left Jordan. Renault pulled out of Formula One, leaving Benetton and Williams with a supply of Renault's 1997 engines developed by Mecachrome. Benetton re-branded these engines as Playlife, a sportswear brand owned by the Benetton family. Chief executive Flavio Briatore was removed and replaced by former World Rally Champion and Prodrive boss David Richards. Fisichella achieved some success with the B198, achieving two consecutive 2nd places in Monaco and Canada as well as pole position in Austria. However, Benetton became uncompetitive towards the end of the season, scoring just a single point in the final seven races. The team partly blamed tyre supplier Bridgestone, claiming that they had favoured the more successful McLaren team. Benetton finished the season 5th in the championship with 33 points.

Chief executive Richards left Benetton after just a year in his post and was replaced by Rocco Benetton for 1999, due to a disagreement with the Benetton family about future strategy. The Renault engines were now developed by Flavio Briatore's Supertec company, but continued to be labelled Playlife. The B199 was a disappointment and demonstrated the further decline of the team. The highlight of the season was Fisichella's 2nd place in Canada, however this only came after numerous retirements from other cars. The following ten races only saw a single points finish for Benetton; Wurz's 5th place in Austria. Benetton ended the season 6th in the championship with 16 points, their worst ever finish.

=== Renault ownership (2000–2001) ===
After Williams switched to works BMW engines, Benetton officially strengthened its partnership with Supertec. Prior to the start of the 2000 season, the team was sold to Renault as the manufacturer sought a return to Formula One, however the team would retain the Benetton name. As part of their restructuring, Renault brought back Flavio Briatore as team manager. The B200 was an improvement on its predecessor, claiming three podium finishes, including 2nd place in Brazil after David Coulthard was disqualified. All three of these podiums were scored by Fisichella; Wurz struggled with the car and only claimed a single points finish with 5th place in Italy. Benetton ended the season 4th in the championship with 20 points.

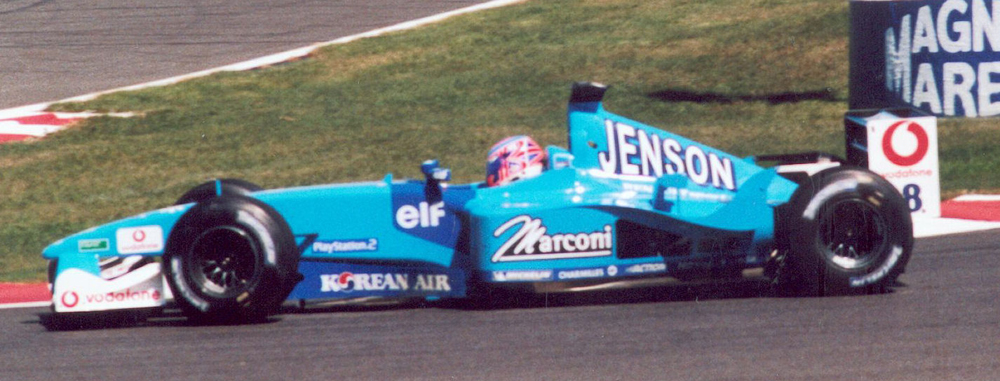
Benetton's final Formula One car, the B201, driven by Jenson Button at the 2001 French Grand Prix

The Renault name returned to Formula One in 2001 as Benetton received a supply of full-works Renault engines. Wurz's struggles in 2000 saw him replaced with a young Jenson Button, who had been dropped by Williams. Despite these changes, Benetton suffered a dismal start to 2001 with the B201 often barely qualifying in the top 20. Only a single point was salvaged in the first eleven races, when Fisichella finished 6th in Brazil after twelve other cars failed to finish. The team's fortunes began to change at the German Grand Prix, when Fisichella and Button finishing 4th and 5th respectively. Continued chassis development allowed Benetton to leave Formula One on something of a high, and the cars' performance lifted. Button and Fisichella scored 10 points for the team, including an impressive podium finish for Fisichella in Belgium.

== Legacy ==
2001 was the final season featuring the Benetton name, as the team was fully re-branded as the Renault F1 Team for the 2002 season. The Renault F1 Team would go on to win the drivers' and constructors' championships in both 2005 and 2006 with Fernando Alonso and Giancarlo Fisichella. The team was sold off and became Lotus F1 Team in 2012. Renault re-purchased the team and was rebranded it Renault Sport Formula One Team in 2016, then becoming Alpine in 2021. The team continues to operate from the site at Enstone established by Benetton in 1992.

The Benetton team is today best known for its success with Michael Schumacher, who accounts for 19 of the team's 27 race victories and their two World Drivers' Championships.

== Nationality ==
Benetton Team had a British licence from 1986 to 1995 and an Italian licence from 1996 to 2001, thus becoming only the second constructor (after Shadow in 1976) to officially change its nationality. The Benetton family wanted this change of nationality to have their Formula One team flying the flag of their own country. At the 1997 German Grand Prix Benetton became the only constructor to have won races under more than one nationality. The team was based in the UK throughout, initially at the former Toleman factory in Witney, Oxfordshire, before moving to a new, modern, bigger factory at Enstone in 1992.

== Racing record ==
(Bold indicates championships won.)

Year	Name	Car	Engine	Tyres	No.	Drivers	Points	WCC
1986	(United Kingdom) Benetton BMW Team	B186	BMW M12/13 L4t	P	19. 20.	(Italy) Teo Fabi (Austria) Gerhard Berger	19	6th
1987	(United Kingdom) Benetton Formula	B187	Ford-Cosworth GBA 1.5 V6t	G	19. 20.	(Italy) Teo Fabi (Belgium) Thierry Boutsen	28	5th
1988	(United Kingdom) Benetton Formula	B188	Ford-Cosworth DFR 3.5 V8	G	19. 20.	(Italy) Alessandro Nannini (Belgium) Thierry Boutsen	**39**	**3rd**
1989	(United Kingdom) Benetton Formula	B188; B189	Ford-Cosworth DFR 3.5 V8; Ford HBA1 3.5 V8; Ford HBA4 3.5 V8	G	19. 20. 20.	(Italy) Alessandro Nannini (United Kingdom) Johnny Herbert (Italy) Emanuele Pirro	39	4th
1990	(United Kingdom) Benetton Formula	B189B; B190	Ford HBA4 3.5 V8	G	19. 19. 20.	(Italy) Alessandro Nannini (Brazil) Roberto Moreno (Brazil) Nelson Piquet	**71**	**3rd**
1991	(United Kingdom) Camel Benetton Ford	B190B; B191	Ford HBA4 3.5 V8; Ford HBA5 3.5 V8	P	19. 19. 20.	(Brazil) Roberto Moreno (Germany) Michael Schumacher (Brazil) Nelson Piquet	38.5	4th
1992	(United Kingdom) Camel Benetton Ford	B191B; B192	Ford HBA5 3.5 V8; Ford HBA7 3.5 V8	G	19. 20.	(Germany) Michael Schumacher (United Kingdom) Martin Brundle	**91**	**3rd**
1993	(United Kingdom) Camel Benetton Ford	B193; B193B	Ford HBA7 3.5 V8; Ford HBA8 3.5 V8	G	5. 6.	(Germany) Michael Schumacher (Italy) Riccardo Patrese	**72**	**3rd**
1994	(United Kingdom) Mild Seven Benetton Ford	B194	Ford ECA Zetec-R 3.5 V8	G	5. 5./6. 6. 6.	(Germany) **Michael Schumacher** (Finland) JJ Lehto (Netherlands) Jos Verstappen (United Kingdom) Johnny Herbert	**103**	**2nd**
1995	(United Kingdom) Mild Seven Benetton Renault	B195	Renault RS7 3.0 V10	G	1. 2.	(Germany) **Michael Schumacher** (United Kingdom) Johnny Herbert	**137**	**1st**
1996	(Italy) Mild Seven Benetton Renault	B196	Renault RS8 3.0 V10	G	3. 4.	(France) Jean Alesi (Austria) Gerhard Berger	**68**	**3rd**
1997	(Italy) Mild Seven Benetton Renault	B197	Renault RS9 3.0 V10	G	7. 8. 8.	(France) Jean Alesi (Austria) Gerhard Berger (Austria) Alexander Wurz	**67**	**3rd**
1998	(Italy) Mild Seven Benetton Playlife	B198	Playlife (Mecachrome) GC37-01 3.0 V10	B	5. 6.	(Italy) Giancarlo Fisichella (Austria) Alexander Wurz	33	5th
1999	(Italy) Mild Seven Benetton Playlife	B199	Playlife (Supertec) FB01 3.0 V10	B	9. 10.	(Italy) Giancarlo Fisichella (Austria) Alexander Wurz	16	6th
2000	(Italy) Mild Seven Benetton Playlife	B200	Playlife (Supertec) FB02 3.0 V10	B	11. 12.	(Italy) Giancarlo Fisichella (Austria) Alexander Wurz	20	4th
2001	(Italy) Mild Seven Benetton Renault Sport	B201	Renault RS21 3.0 V10	M	7. 8.	(Italy) Giancarlo Fisichella (United Kingdom) Jenson Button	10	7th

== See also ==
- Benetton family
- Benetton Group
- Benetton Rugby
- List of Italian companies
- Benetton Basket
- List of Formula One constructors

== Footnotes ==
Sporting positions
Preceded by Williams	Formula One Constructors' Champion; 1995	Succeeded by Williams
