= Luciano Benetton =

Italian businessman (born 1935)

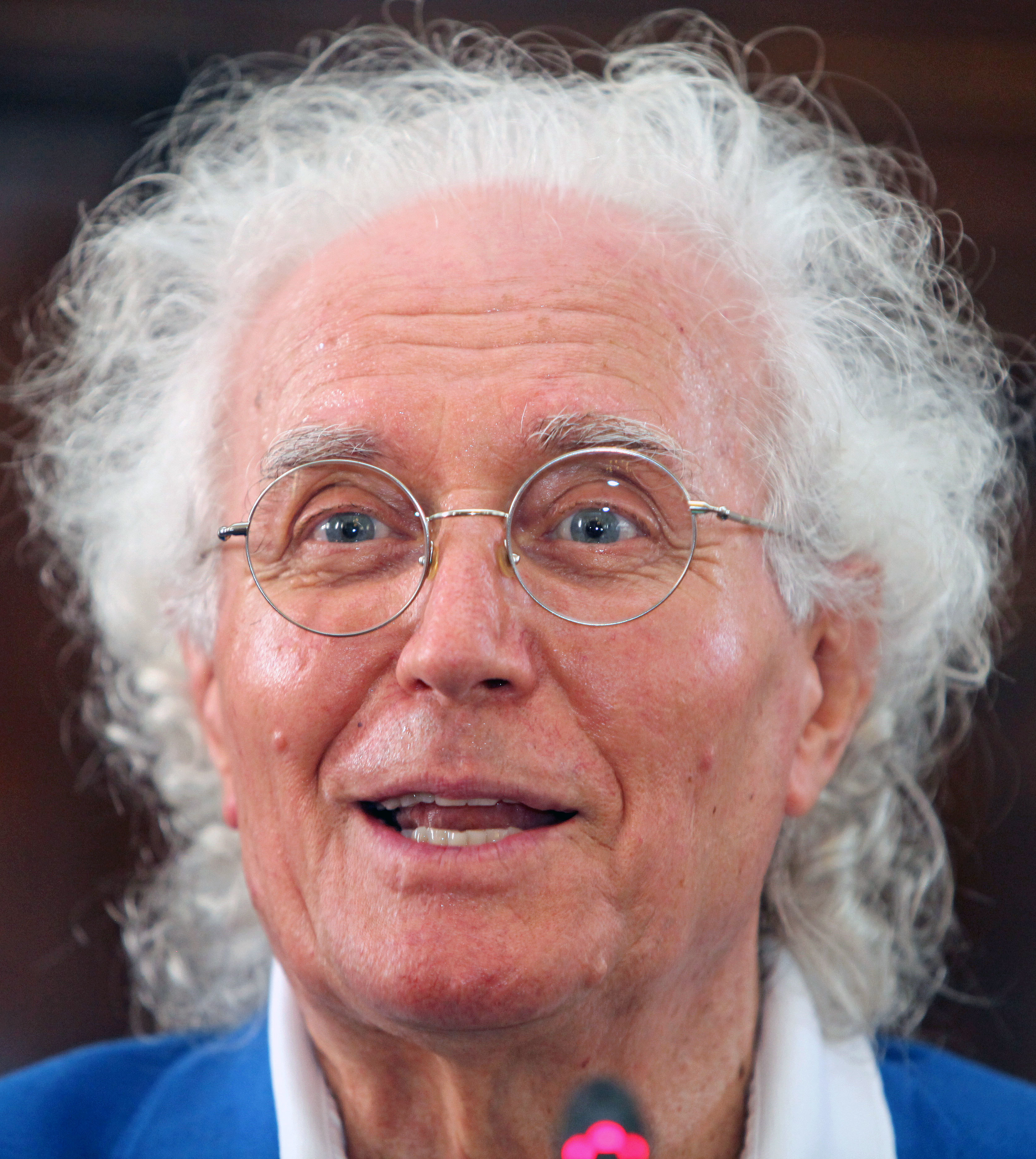
- Benetton in 2015

Member of the Senate
- In office 23 April 1992 – 14 April 1994

Personal details
- Born: 13 May 1935 (age 91) Treviso, Italy
- Party: Italian Republican Party
- Children: 4, including Alessandro
- Relatives: Giuliana Benetton (sister); Carlo Benetton (brother); Gilberto Benetton (brother)
- Occupation: Co-founder of Benetton Group

Luciano Benetton (born 13 May 1935) is an Italian billionaire businessman and one of the co-founders of Benetton Group, an Italian fashion brand. He served as the chairman of Benetton from 1978 to 2012.

== Early life ==
Luciano Benetton was born on 13 May 1935 in Treviso. His father had a small business and following his death, Benetton dropped out of school at the age of 14 to work in a clothing shop. He saved money to buy a $200 knitting machine and teamed up with his sister to produce a collection of twenty pieces of yellow, green and pale blue sweaters.

== Career ==
In 1965, together with his siblings Giuliana, Carlo and Gilberto, he founded Benetton Group. The starting point of the business was the production of brightly coloured knitted sweaters, made by Juliana Benetton on a home knitting machine.

In 1992, he was elected to the Italian Senate.

In 2003, he announced that his family is stepping down from running the company, due to decreasing sales and increased competition.

In 2006, he founded the Imago Mundi Collection, a collection of contemporary art in 10 by 12 cm format from around the world.

In May 2015, Forbes estimated the net worth of Luciano Benetton and each of his three siblings at US$2.9 billion.

== Personal life ==
He is married with four children and lives in Treviso. His son Alessandro chaired Benetton Group from April 2012 to May 2014.
