= Lotte Duty Free =

South Korean duty-free shop chain

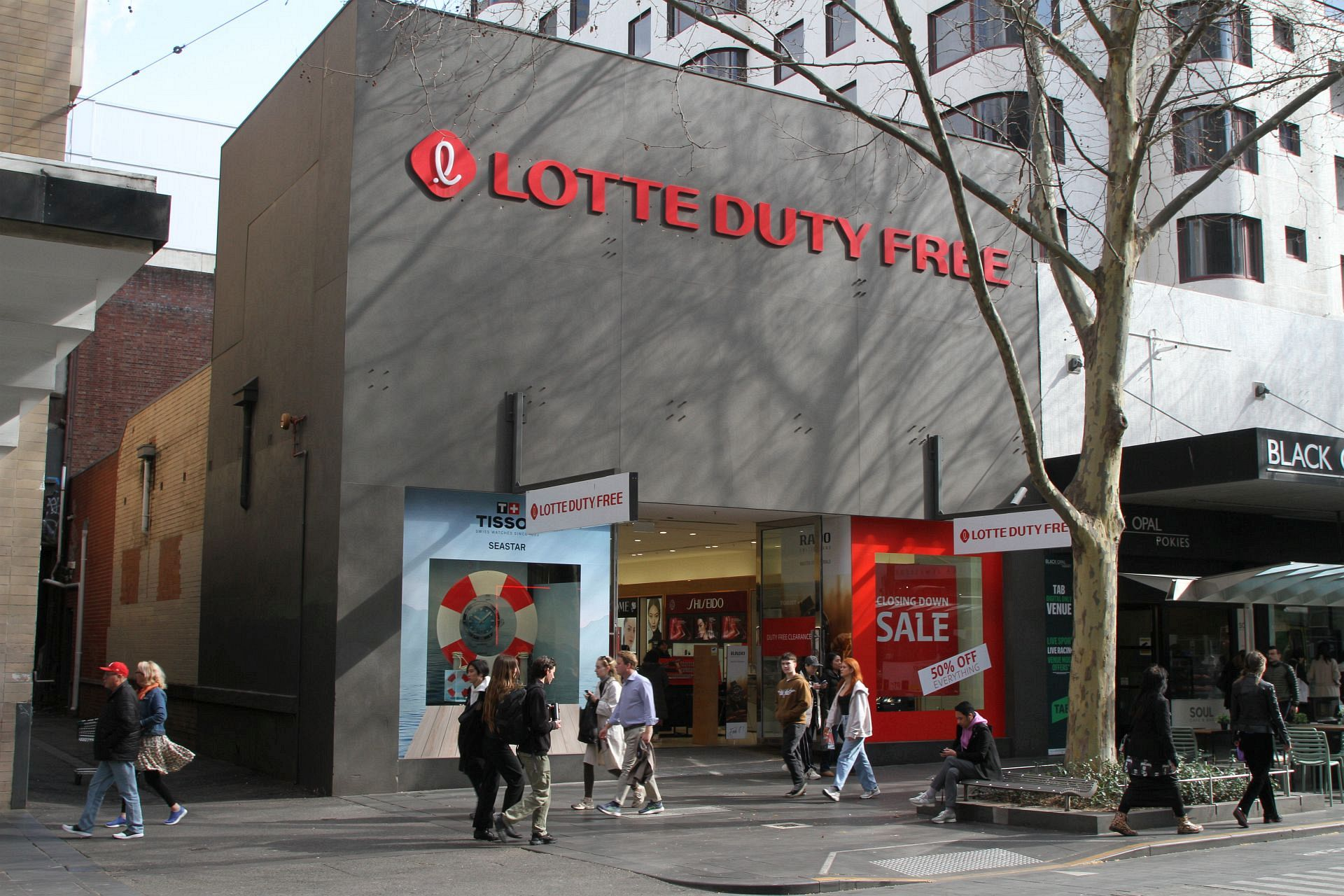
- Standalone Lotte Duty Free store in Melbourne, Australia
- Native name: 롯데면세점
- Romanized name: Rotde Myeonsejeom
- Type: Division
- Industry: Duty-free shop
- Founded: February 1, 1980; 46 years ago
- Headquarters: Seoul, South Korea
- Parent: Hotel Lotte
- Website: lottedfs.com

Lotte Duty Free (LDF; Korean: 롯데면세점; Hanja: 樂天免稅店; RR: Rotde Myeonsejeom), a duty-free division of Hotel Lotte, is a travel retailer headquartered in Seoul, South Korea. LDF is one of the largest travel retailers in the world alongside Dufry and DFS Group.

== Locations ==
Lotte Duty Free operates more than 20 duty-free shops in seven territories, including Australia, Guam, Japan, South Korea, New Zealand, Singapore and Vietnam.

=== South Korea ===
- Main Downtown, Seoul
- World Tower Downtown, Seoul
- Busan Downtown, Busan
- Jeju Downtown, Jeju
- Gimpo Airport, Seoul
- Gimhae Airport, Gimhae
- Jeju Airport, Jeju

=== Australia ===
- Brisbane Airport
- Darwin Airport
- Melbourne Downtown
- Melbourne Airport
- Sydney Downtown

=== Japan ===
- Ginza Downtown, Tokyo
- Kansai Airport, Osaka

=== New Zealand ===
- Wellington Airport

=== Singapore ===
- Changi Airport

=== United States ===
- Guam Airport

=== Vietnam ===
- Da Nang Downtown
- Da Nang Airport
- Nha Trang Airport
- Hanoi Airport

== See also ==
- List of duty-free shops
