= Gianmario Tondato Da Ruos =

Italian executive (born 1960)

- Born: February 12, 1960 (age 66); Oderzo, Italy
- Education: Ca' Foscari University of Venice
- Occupation: Business executive
- Children: 2

Gianmario Tondato (born February 12, 1960) is an Italian business executive who has been the Chief Executive Officer at Autogrill since 2003.

After schooling in Oderzo (Liceo Scientifico Brandolini) he took a degree in Business Economics at Ca' Foscari University of Venice. He started his career in 1985 with Gruppo Nordica S.p.A. (in human resources) and then joined Arnoldo Mondadori Editore. In 1986 he moved to Gruppo Edizione Holding, where he held various posts in Benetton Group, United Optical and Benetton Sportsystem, which he left in 1999.

He joined Autogrill Group early in 2000 and was initially in charge of the re-organization and re-launching of Autogrill's American subsidiary HMSHost in the United States. He would go on to became the CEO of Autogrill.

== Early life ==
Gianmario Tondato Da Ruos was born in Oderzo, Italy on February 12, 1960. He did his high school studies in Oderzo (Liceo Scientifico Brandolini) and took a 1st class degree in business economics at Ca' Foscari University of Venice.

== Career ==
After graduating in business economics, Tondato Da Ruos began his career with two short spells at Nordica S.p.A. (1985) and Arnoldo Mondadori Editore (1986).

In 1986 he joined Benetton Group, where he worked till 1999 as head of Organization and Development, in which capacity he also managed restructurings of group companies (United Optical and Sportsystem).

=== Autogrill ===
In January 2000 he joined the Italian catering company Autogrill – then operating exclusively in the European motorway channel – and moved to the United States to manage the re-organization and re-launching of the newly acquired American subsidiary HMSHost, a process that enabled the Group to consolidate its position in the USA and prepare the ground for further international expansion.

Back in Italy, in April 2003, he became Group CEO, a role in which he brought about a strategic refocusing on concession business and diversification across sectors, channels and geographical regions.

From 2003 to 2013, with the creation of the Travel Retail division through the acquisitions and subsequent integration of Aldeasa S.A., Alpha Group Plc. and World Duty Free Europe Ltd., Tondato Da Ruos enabled Autogrill to double its sales. The following step was to demerge the Travel Retail business and list [World Duty Free] S.p.A.(1 October 2013) on the stock market operated by Borsa Italiana, thus launching a new phase of growth for both companies. Tondato has also been chairman of World Duty Free S.p.A.

In 2022, as CEO of Autogrill, Tondato led the Group's integration with Dufry, a Swiss-based international travel retailer. The deal aims at creating a new global travel retail and restaurant group with combined revenues of more than €12 billion.

== Other positions ==
Gianmario Tondato Da Ruos is also chairman of HMSHost Corporation, an independent director at International Game Technology Plc (formerly GTECH S.p.A. and Lottomatica S.p.A.).

He has been previously chairman of the board of directors of World Duty Free S.p.A., and a director of World Duty Free Group S.A.U. He has also been a non-executive director of Autogrill Holding UK Plc, a director of Alpha Group Plc., and a director of World Duty Free Group España S.A.

== Personal life ==
Tondato Da Ruos is married and has two daughters. He is a runner and a former rugby player, having played for years in minor division clubs like Oderzo Rugby, where he was a wing, and Silea.

== Recognition ==
In 2008 Gianmario Tondato Da Ruos received a commendation from Niaf (National Italian American Foundation) for his furthering of dialogue between the United States and Italy. He is listed in the Thomson Reuters Extel Surveys for 2009.
