= Noy =

Noy, NOy or NOY may refer to:

- Noy language

== People ==
- Joaquín Noy (born 1992), Uruguayan footballer
- Wilfred Noy (1883–1948), English film director
- Noy Castillo (born 1974), Filipino-American professional basketball player
- Noy Holland (born 1960), American writer
- Nôy (died 1829), prince ruler of Muang Phuan
- Van Noy (surname)
- Vannoy (surname)

== Arts & Entertainment ==
- Abhinoy Noy, 1983 Indian Bengali language romance film
- Noy (film), 2010 Filipino independent drama film
- Noy (album)

== Other uses ==
- Noy (brandy)
- Noy (political faction)
- NOy, a component of air pollution
- Noy, a character in Genshin Impact
