= Van Noy Railway News and Hotel Company =

The Van Noy Railway News and Hotel Company, known today as HMSHost, was a business founded by the Van Noy Brothers of Kansas City, Missouri, which developed at the beginning of the twentieth century to provide services to travelers aboard passenger trains. At a time when most passenger trains carried neither dining cars nor lounge cars, private businessmen such as the Van Noys recognized a profit opportunity by operating eating houses at railroad junction points and selling snacks and novelties aboard the trains.

== History ==
Meal ticket issued to employee of Missouri Pacific Railway, authorizing purchase of meals at special discounted "railroad rate" of thirty five cents, at all Van Noy dining rooms located along the Missouri Pacific and Iron Mountain Railways.

In 1893, Ira Clinton Van Noy formed a retail cigar and news business at No. 1076 Union Avenue, in Kansas City, Missouri. Four years later, on July 26, 1897, he joined with two of his brothers, Charles S. Van Noy and J.L. Van Noy, along with G.W. Krebs of St. Louis, to incorporate the Van Noy Railroad News Company. Railroad 'news services' generally sold magazines, newspapers, books, tobacco products, fruits, nuts, and novelties from newsstands located in train stations and by the use of a 'news butch', a young man who walked through the train making sales. As the business flourished, the Van Noy brothers became prominent members of local Kansas City society. I.C. Van Noy, the eldest brother, served as president of the company, and the youngest brother, Henry Clay Van Noy, also joined the company when he came of age.

The Van Noy Railroad News Company grew rapidly after securing large contracts with Missouri Pacific Railway and its subsidiary, the St. Louis, Iron Mountain and Southern Railway. In the era before dining cars were carried on trains, Van Noy eating houses were established at points along the 7,500-mile (12,100 km) Missouri Pacific system to feed passengers. Later, at important terminals and train crew division points, Van Noy hotels were constructed to house both travelers and railroad train crews laying over between trips. Reflecting the success of the company, in 1909 both I.C. Van Noy and C.S. Van Noy constructed large homes at 6700-6800 Elmwood in Kansas City. The two homes were added the National Register of Historic Places in 1987.

By 1910, the Van Noy Railroad News Company controlled sales distribution along 32,000 miles (51,000 km) of railroad. The Company also had 52 hotels and restaurants, 20 concession stores, and 21 distribution offices. The employee count at this time was about 1,600. In 1912, the company name was changed to the Van Noy Railway Hotel and News Company, reflecting the company's increased emphasis on the hotel side of the business.

In 1916, when he was 15 years old, Walt Disney spent a summer working for the Van Noy Interstate Company as a news butch, selling merchandise on various rail lines radiating out of Kansas City. His first run was from Kansas City to Jefferson City on the Missouri Pacific Railroad, but he also made runs on the Missouri, Kansas and Texas Railway, and Kansas City Southern Railway, according to an article that Disney wrote years later for Railroad Magazine.

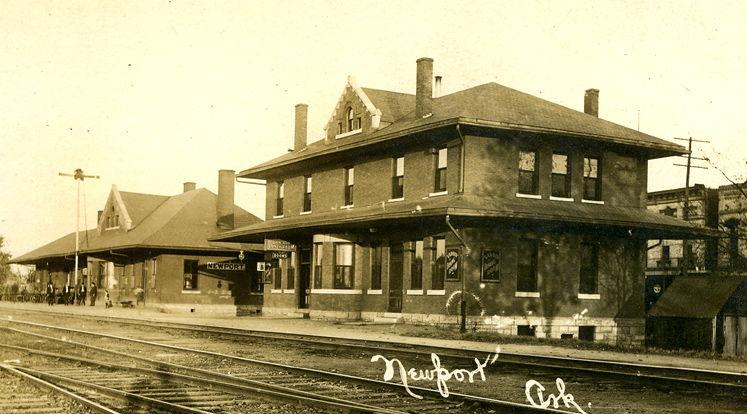
Van Noy hotel constructed in Newport, Arkansas in 1907. Note how hotel follows architectural style of adjacent depot which had been constructed five years earlier. Signs on corner of building say "Van Noy Dining Room", while sign over door says "Van Noy Lunch Room."

Van Noy Railway Hotel and News began a series of mergers and acquisitions in 1914, starting with the Brown News Company (also headquartered in Kansas City) which was acquired on October 1, 1914. In 1915, the company began consolidating operations with the New York City-based Interstate News Company. The company name was changed to Van Noy Interstate News Company in 1917, but the company headquarters remained in Kansas City under the leadership of Ira C. Van Noy.

In 1922, the company owned distribution avenues covering 90,000 miles (140,000 km) of railroad, and had accumulated a massive portfolio of concession stands, stores, restaurants, and hotels. However, the need for railroad news services and en route eating houses was declining as railroads added dining cars to more trains. In early 1923, Missouri Pacific Railroad ended their long standing affiliation with Van Noy Interstate, although Van Noy continued to operate hotels at some smaller terminals where train crews ended their runs.

== Van Noy Hotel or Eating House locations ==
This is a partial list of known Van Noy establishments.

- Arkansas: Bald Knob, Benton, El Dorado, Fort Smith, Gurdon, Hope, Knobel, Lexa, McGehee, Newport, Sulphur Springs, Texarkana, Van Buren, Wynne.
- Kansas: Coffeyville, Council Grove, Downs, Fort Scott, Goff, Greenleaf, Gypsum, Hoisington, Horace, Osawatomie, Wichita, Yates Center.
- Missouri: Bismark, Delta, Joplin, Poplar Bluff, Sedalia.
- Louisiana: Ferriday, Monroe, Shreveport
- Oklahoma: Wagoner
- Tennessee: Memphis

== Evolution away from Railway Service ==
As a result of changes in railroad passenger train service, Van Noy Interstate began to focus more on the hotel side of their operations. In 1922, the Company acquired the Gem Fountain Company, and in 1926 the company began operating as the Interstate Company. The Interstate Company operated restaurants in train stations, as well as lunch rooms in bus stations. One of the more famous hotels owned by the company was the Beverly Hills Hotel, owned and operated by Interstate between 1928 and 1932. The Van Noy family's involvement in the Company ended following the death of the last surviving Van Noy Brother, Henry Clay Van Noy.

Horizons were broadened in 1954, when the Interstate Company was awarded its first airport contract at the San Francisco International Airport. Numerous name changes and corporate consolidations took place as the surviving company moved further from its roots as a railroad news service, although the company remained in the core business of providing services to travelers. By the time that the Interstate Company became Interstate HOSTS in 1959, all railroad station restaurant operations had ended. In 1968, the name was again changed to Host International, and this company was then acquired by the Marriott Corporation in 1982 and was then renamed to Host Marriott Corporation.

On March 22, 2002, Autogrill S.p.A. purchased the Host Marriott Services division from the Marriott Corporation. Through this acquisition, Autogrill gained contracts in 18 of the 20 largest United States airports as well as franchises such as Pizza Hut, Burger King, Sbarro, and Starbucks. Increased revenue from these acquisitions allowed Autogrill to expand heavily into Europe’s successful railway systems – the original transportation mode embraced by the Van Noy Railway News Company. Autogrill renamed the company HMSHost, which is largely the corporate successor to the 1897 Van Noy operation and continues to provide products, services, and entertainment to customers on the go. The hotel and resorts assets of the original Van Noy operation was spun off from Marriott as the Host Marriott Corporation in 1996. Today, the company is called Host Hotels and Resorts and is a Real estate investment trust, employing some 229 employees.

== See also ==
- Fred Harvey Company
