= Dubai Duty Free =

Duty-free shop at Dubai's international airports

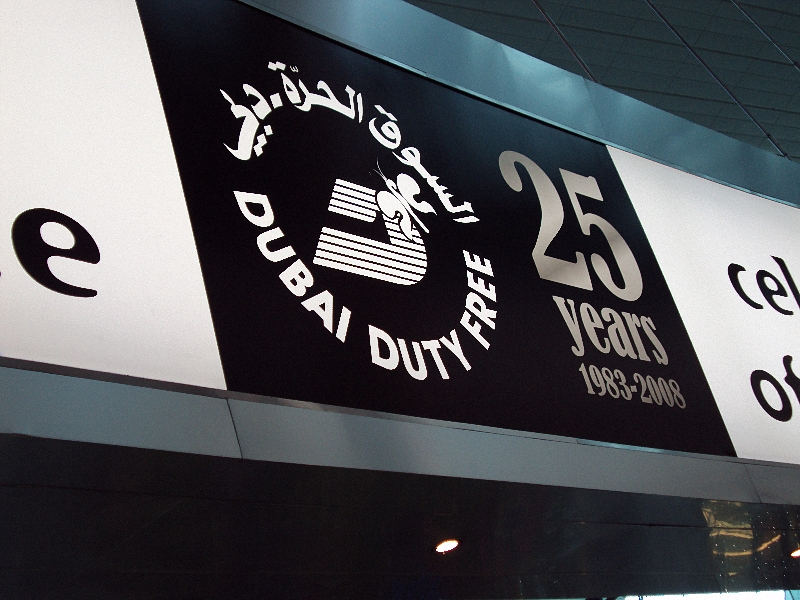
Dubai duty free

Dubai Duty Free (DDF) is the company responsible for duty-free selling operations at Dubai International Airport and Al Maktoum International Airport.

Founded on 20 December 1983, DDF recorded first-year sales of US$20 million. On 20 December 2023, its 40th anniversary year, sales turnover reached US $2.16 billion, eclipsing pre-pandemic revenues. Its top five markets are India, Russia, China, and the UK. The company employs 5,500 staff and makes 55,000 daily transactions.

Ahmed bin Saeed Al Maktoum is chairman of DDF. Colm McLoughlin was the executive vice-chairman and CEO until 2024, preceding his death. DDF is a subsidiary of the government-owned Investment Corporation of Dubai.

== Foundation ==
Aer Rianta, which since 1969 operated duty-free shopping at Shannon Airport, which had become the first duty-free airport in 1947, was invited to present a proposal for the operations and management of a duty-free selling operation at Dubai International Airport. Prior to this, the airport had been served by various retail concessions managed by traders from Dubai. The plan was presented to Sheikh Mohammed by Mohi-Din Binhendi, the director-general of Dubai Civil Aviation, and was approved on the condition that the duty-free shopping area be expanded to twice its original size and opened within six months.

The duty-free shopping area, planned to serve three million passengers a year, was funded with an $820,000 loan from the National Bank of Dubai. A challenge faced by the ten-man Aer Rianta management team, which had signed a consultancy contract with Dubai Civil Aviation, was to negotiate the transfer of the existing concessions, resulting in Dubai Duty Free acquiring their stocks at rates preferred by the shop owners.

DDF officially opened on 20 December 1983. At the end of the Aer Rianta consultancy contract, McLoughlin decided to stay and manage the new operation and two of the original Aer Rianta team stayed with him. In 1985, Ahmed bin Saeed Al Maktoum became chairman of the airline Emirates and the Department of Civil Aviation.

Mohammed bin Rashid Al Maktoum is regarded as the driving force behind DDF, approving the project to double its size and endorsing major concepts.

== Operations ==
In 1987, the arrivals duty-free shop opened to the public and was earning around $200,000 a day. In 1989, the Dubai Duty Free introduced its 'Finest Surprise' promotion, a 1,000 ticket raffle to win a luxury car. The promotion has run continuously since then.

The opening of the Sheikh Rashid terminal at Dubai International Airport in 2000 saw the staff count at the various DDF locations throughout the airport rise to 900, which came with a 5,400 M^{2} expansion of floor space. The turnover in 2001 rose to $222 million and in 2003, 20 years after it was established, finished off with a turnover of $380 million.

DDF was named the single largest airport retailer in the world in terms of revenue, based on the years 2008–10 and 2013.

DDF employs over 6,100 staff of 47 nationalities, including 25 of its original 100 staff recruited in 1983.

The company has been named the world's largest airport retailer. By 2008, it was making per day what it had made in its entire first year. Its 2018 revenue exceeded US$2 billion.

== See also ==
- List of duty-free shops
