= Hellenic Duty Free Shops =

Greek company in the travel retail industry

- Type: Private Company
- Industry: Travel retail
- Founded: 1979
- Founder: The Greek state
- Headquarters: Agios Stefanos, Attica, Greece
- Number of locations: 97 shops at 45 exit points from Greece
- Area served: Exit points from Greece
- Products: Perfumes, cosmetics, tobacco products, alcoholic drinks, chocolates, traditional Greek products, luxury items, international brand name products watches, glasses, electronic items, games, gifts, souvenirs, clothing.
- Parent: Avolta AG
- Subsidiaries: Hellenic Distributions SA
- Website: www.dutyfreeshops.gr

Hellenic Duty Free Shops SA, founded in 1979, is a Greek company in the travel retail industry. The company holds the exclusive right to the retail sale of duty-free goods in Greece.

It has a network in Greece, composed of 97 shops at 45 points (22 airports, 11 border checkpoints, and 12 ports).

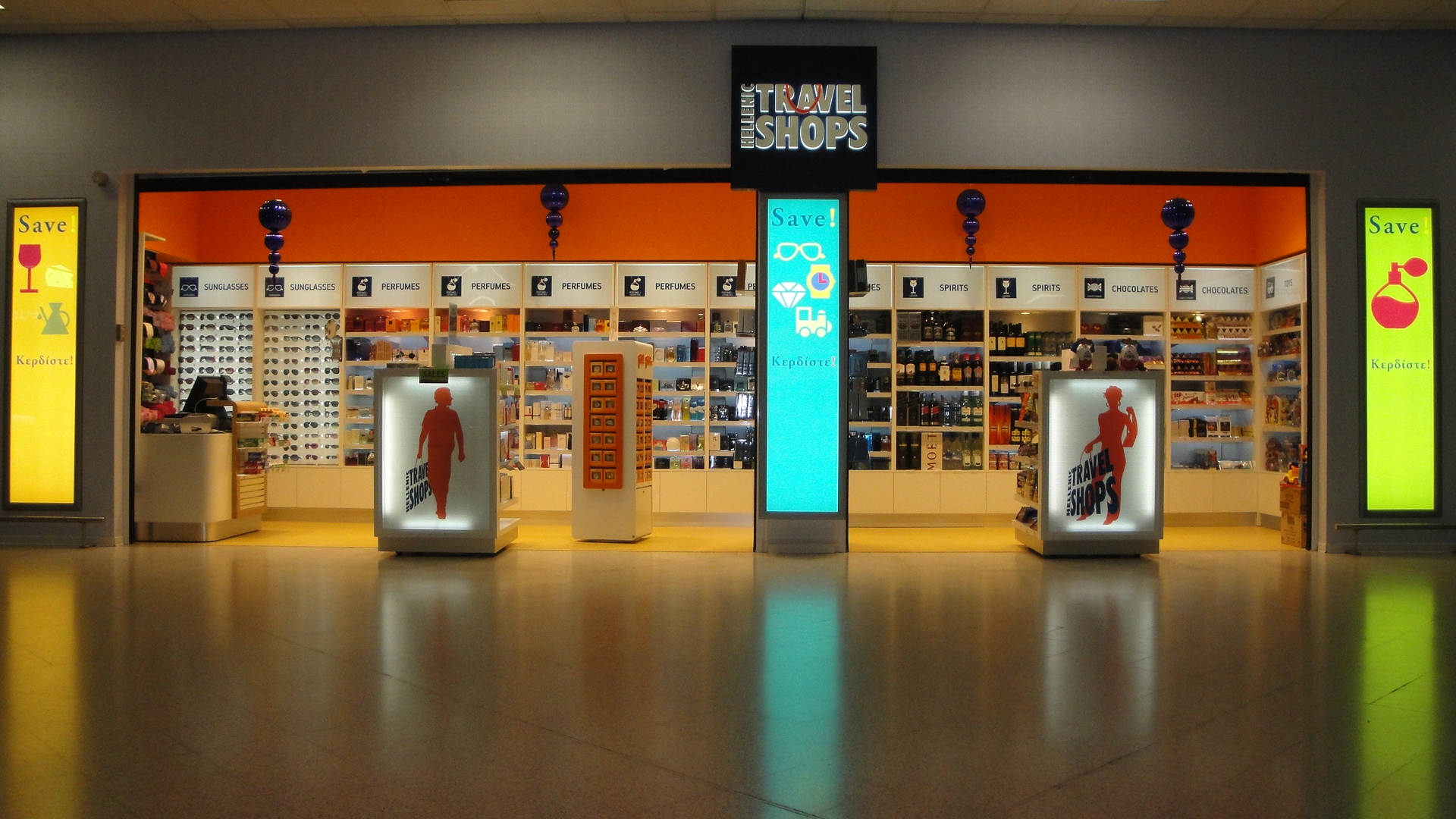
Athens international Airport arrivals

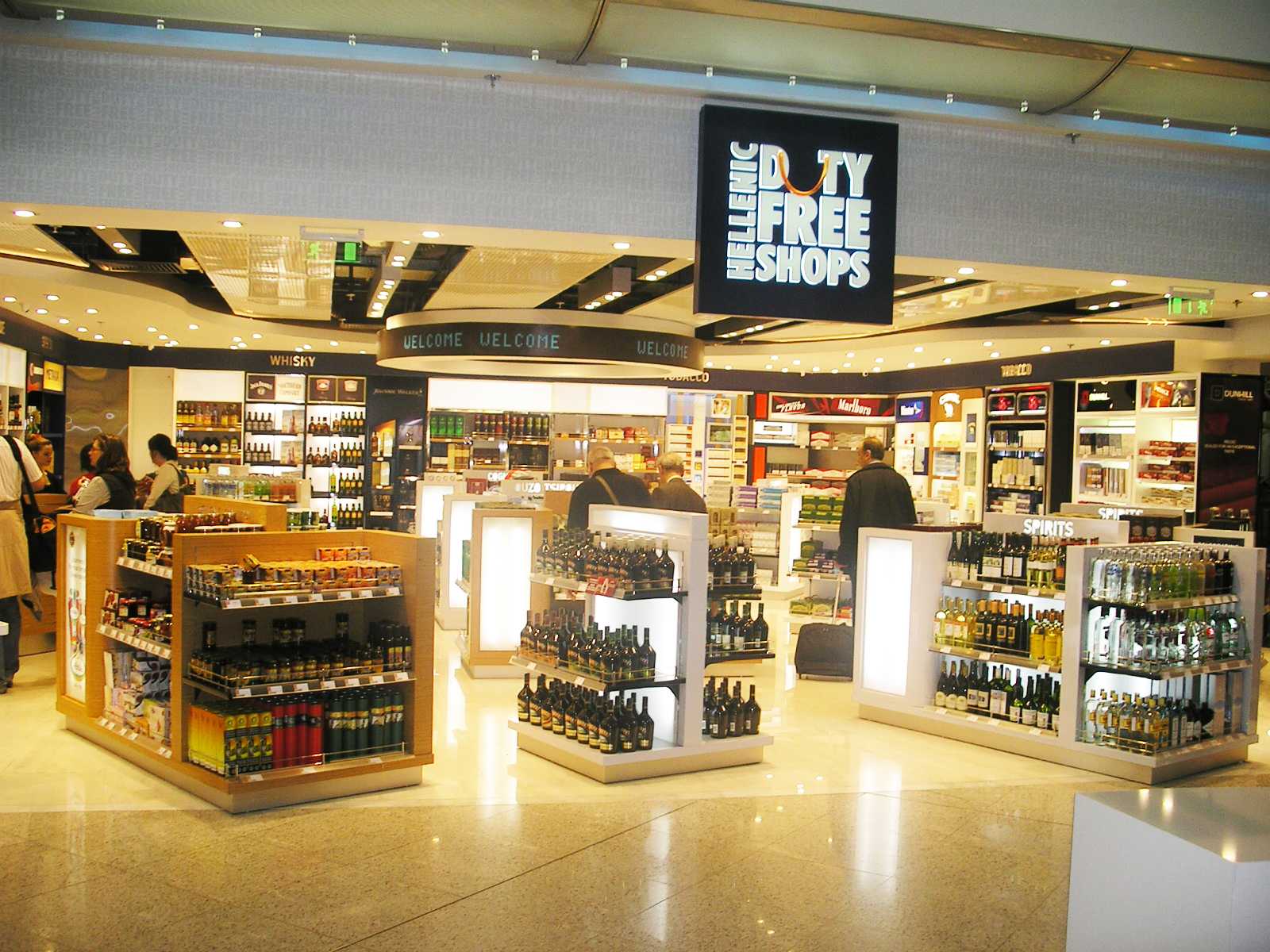
Athens International Airport cava

== History ==
=== 1900s ===
The company was founded in 1979 to provide duty-free goods to travelers leaving through Greek border checkpoints. Two shops were launched, one at the Eastern, and one at the Western Airport in Athens, Greece.

In 1998 "Hellenic Duty Free Shops" was listed on the Athens Stock Exchange.

The abolition of the sale of duty-free goods to passengers travelling within Europe in 1999 was a crucial point for the future of duty-free shopping. By adopting single discount prices (travel value policy) in all product categories (with the exception of tobacco and alcohol), the company maintained its special prices by absorbing, along with its suppliers, taxes, and duties.

In 2000 the first stage of privatization was completed with the transfer of a 79% stake to the Agricultural Bank of Greece (ATE).

=== 2000s ===
In 2000, the new Athens Airport was opened in the area of Spata Attica. The commercial area in the new airport was designed on the basis of the specifications for modern shopping centers, creating new growth prospects. The company launched four shops there. Today, at Athens International Airport, 31 shops are in operation (12 in intra-Schengen Departures, 12 on the extra-Schengen Departures level, four in the free zone and three in the Arrivals hall, in the baggage claim area).

In 2006 privatization of the company was completed. "Links London Ltd" and "Elmec Sports SA" were acquired in 2006 and 2007, respectively. The subsidiary «Hellenic Distributions SΑ» was founded in 2001.

Year	Facts
1979	Company launched with two shops
1997	Signing of agreement for the exclusive sale of duty-free goods at exit points from Greece up to 2,048 (airports, ports and border checkpoints).; Company shares listed on the Athens Stock Exchange with the issue of 7,625,000 new shares and public registration for 7,525,000 shares.
1998	Company shares traded on the Athens Stock Exchange
1999	EU decision to abolish the sale of duty-free goods to passengers travelling within the EU (1 July).; First privatization of company with the sale of a 25.25% stake and parallel transfer of administrative control of the duty-free shops to a group of Greek and foreign investors.
2000	Foundation of subsidiary company Hellenic Distributions SA» involved in the supply of cruise ships, ferry-boats, merchant vessels, other companies, military bases and embassies, and operating retail stores.
2001	Relocation and launch of three company shops in the Athens International Airport.
2003	Signing of a contract for the purchase and sale of a 40% stake between ATE, which held the majority of shares, and the companies Folli Follie ABEE and Germanos ΑΒΕΕ and transfer of administrative control of the company jointly to Folli Follie ABEE and Germanos ΑΒΕΕ.
2006	Acquisition of "Links London Ltd."; Purchase by Folli Follie of an additional 25% stake that belonged to the company Germanos.
2007	Acquisition of "Elmec Sport ABETE."
2008	Launching of logo, which symbolizes a shopping bag and portrays a smile.
2011	Merger of the companies "Folli Follie Αbee", "Hellenic Duty Free Shops SA" and "Elmec Sport ΑΒΕΤΕ" with absorption by Hellenic Duty Free Shops SA (surviving company).; Alliance of the Folli Follie Group with the Chinese Group Fosun International, an investment group with a presence in tourism and travel retail markets.
2013	Acquired by Dufry AG

== Awards and distinctions ==
Hellenic Duty Free Shops is ranked in 7th place among "The World's Top 50 Giant Operators, 2010", based on Generation Research. In 2008 it was presented with the «Export Activity 2007» award by the Athens Chamber of Commerce & Industry. It has also received the distinction as the Best New Beauty Store for its perfumes and cosmetics shop in the Intra Schengen area at Athens International Airport by the Duty Free News International Product Award in 2010.

== Development strategy ==
The company has 97 shops at 45 points in airports, ports and border checkpoints. All the shops are located after passport control.

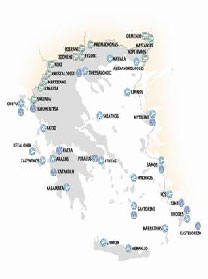
Map-Hellenic-duty-free-shops

During the period 2009–2011, €31,200,000.00 were invested. Shops at the international airport have been refurbished to meet the purchasing needs of today's travellers, e.g. perfumes, cosmetics and Folli Follie, Hellenic Gourmet, Cava και Luxury .

The border shop at Kipi, including restaurants and car parks was remodelled, while renovation took place at discount stores with brand name clothing and shoes operating at Kipi, Evzones, Niki and Promachonas.

== Commercial activity ==
Hellenic Duty Free Shops offers brand name perfumes, cosmetics, alcoholic drinks, tobacco products, chocolates, Greek foods, clothing, accessories, glasses, travel goods, souvenirs, games, electronic items, etc. at travel value prices.

The company has established the institution of «Supplier of the Year», rewarding international and Greek suppliers-associates who are singled out for their commercial creativity and innovation along with their high performance each year. The company takes part in the Athens International Airport Programme "Best Price Guarantee". If a traveller finds the product they purchased at the shops in the International Airport at a cheaper price somewhere else, then the difference is returned to them twice over.

It participates in airline loyalty programmes (Miles & More from Lufthansa).

== Re-branding ==
The need for renewing the company's image led the management to create a new logo in 2009. It combines the company's commercial activity, retaining elements of the old logo, such as the word "Hellenic" and the blue colour. The key feature of the new logo is the orange handle. Apart from referring to a commercial transaction as it symbolizes a shopping bag, the mark also portrays a smile. It is accompanied by the motto «The pleasure of travel».

== Corporate social responsibility ==
Hellenic Duty Free Shops has policies on social and environmental responsibility aimed at the sustainable development of the company as well as of the local communities in which it is active. It donated €335,000 toward the support of local communities in the regions of Kastanies, Feres, Anixi, Promachonas, the islands of Karpathos and Symi, as well as the fire-stricken area of Ileia.

It makes donations to the ‘Mitera’ Foundation for Infants, to the Centre for Mental Health and other public welfare institutions. It also sponsors events taking place in local communities where the company has shops.

The company has formed a football team for employees, while each year it rewards distinguished pupils and students, employees’ children, with cash gifts. The group participates in programmes for recycling corporate resources, thus conserving resources.

== FF Group – merger ==
The FF Group was formed in 2010, following the merger of the three companies Folli Follie, Hellenic Duty Free Shops and Elmec Sport, into Hellenic Duty Free Shops. The merger was finalized on 31 December 2010.

The group has 700 sales outlets and 5,900 personnel. In particular, following its alliance with Fosun International, it is expected to strengthen its presence in Asia to an even greater extent.

The FF Group controls the subsidiary Links London, which was bought out in July 2006. It is an English brand of jewellery, watches and luxury items. Its network numbers 44 shops and 22 sales outlets in commercial centres worldwide. It has been awarded «Jewellery Brand of the Υear» at UK jewellery awards, and was the creator of the official jewellery collection for the 2012 Olympic Games.

Elmec Sport S.A. was acquired in October 2007. It has 120 shops in Greece, Cyprus, Rumania and Bulgaria, while it manages «Attica The Department Store", "Golden Attica", the "Factory Outlet" and the "Factory Outlet Airport". It has a network of shops selling Nike products in Greece, and the right to the wholesale distribution of Converse products.

In 2013, Dufry AG acquired 100% of Hellenic Duty Free Shops.

== Subsidiary company ==
=== Hellenic Distributions ===
Hellenic Duty Free Shops owns the subsidiary Hellenic Distributions, which was formed in September 2000. The company was created to cover the legal gap left by the establishment of the parent company Hellenic Duty Free ShopsS Α.Ε. The parent company was unable, according to its statutes, to establish shops for personnel, shops in arrivals halls at airports, in common access areas, at points in other words, which do not serve the travelling public. It was also unable to become involved in the wholesale and ship supply sectors.

The company, Hellenic Distributions, today has a network of shops at airports and ports throughout the country, including a personnel store, shops located in common access areas in airports, e.g. Triton, in the free zone at Athens International Airport, the shop at Anchialos airport, etc.

Since 2005, it has been active in the ship supply sector and is the exclusive distributor in Greece of products from the companies Philip Morris, Papastratos, Pernod Ricard, Hershey's, World Brands Duty Free, William Grants, Ian Macleod, Quality Spirits International, Monus Doo, Nemiroff, Efe Alkollu, Imperial Tobacco and Phoenicia Fereos.

== See also ==
- List of companies listed on the Athens Stock Exchange
- List of duty-free shops
