= Ashley Christensen =

American chef and restaurateur

- Born: Greensboro, North Carolina
- Education: North Carolina State University
- Culinary career
- Current restaurant(s): Poole's Diner Beasley's Chicken & Honey Fox Liquor Bar Death & Taxes Poole'side Pies AC Restaurants
- Award(s) won: James Beard Foundation Award Best Chef: Southeast (2014), Outstanding Chef (2019) Food & Wine Restaurants of the Year (2016) Eater Best Chef in the Nation (2017)
- Website: https://ac-restaurants.com

Ashley Christensen is an American chef, restaurateur, author, and culinary celebrity. She is based in Raleigh, North Carolina, and the chef + proprietor of AC Restaurants, a hospitality group that operates Poole's Diner, Fox Liquor Bar, Beasley's Chicken + Honey, Death & Taxes, Poole'side Pies, and AC Events. A two-time James Beard Award winner, she is widely credited for helping to put Raleigh's food scene on the map.

== Early life and education ==
Christensen was born in Greensboro, North Carolina. She attended North Carolina State University, where she began cooking by throwing dinner parties for her friends and family.

== Career ==
Christensen lives and works in Raleigh, North Carolina, having taken her first restaurant job at the age of 21. Since making Raleigh her home, she has sought to foster community through food, philanthropy, and the stimulation of the city's downtown neighborhood. Her work has gained national attention from such publications as Bon Appétit, Gourmet, The New York Times, Southern Living, Wall Street Journal, and Garden & Gun. She has also appeared on Food Network's popular series Iron Chef America and MSNBC's Your Business.

=== Restaurants ===
Christensen is the chef and proprietor of AC Restaurants, a hospitality group. In 2007, she opened Poole's Diner, named for one of the building's original tenants and one of downtown Raleigh's first restaurants. In 2011, she opened her next projects, Beasley's Chicken + Honey and Fox Liquor Bar, in a corner building once occupied by a Piggly-Wiggly in the 1940s.

In 2015, AC Restaurants opened Death & Taxes, a restaurant celebrating wood-fire cooking with Southern ingredients, and Bridge Club, a private events loft and cooking classroom. In 2019, she opened Poole'side Pies, featuring Christensen's take on Neapolitan-style pizza, next door to Poole's Diner. She co-founded BB's Crispy Chicken, a fast-casual fried chicken sandwich concept with locations slated for all over the Triangle, in 2021.

=== Cookbooks ===
Christensen is the author of two cookbooks, Poole's: Recipes and Stories from a Modern Diner (2016), and It's Always Freezer Season, co-authored with her wife, Kaitlyn Goalen (2021).

== Awards, nominations & accolades ==
- 2014: James Beard Foundation Award Best Chef: Southeast (winner)
- 2016: James Beard Foundation Award Best New Restaurant - Death & Taxes (finalist)
- 2016: Food & Wine Restaurants of the Year - Death & Taxes (winner)
- 2017: Eater Best Chef in the Nation (winner)
- 2018: James Beard Foundation Award Outstanding Chef (finalist)
- 2019: James Beard Foundation Award Outstanding Chef (winner)
- 2021: Honorary Doctorate of Humane Letters, North Carolina State University

== Personal life ==
In 2019, Christensen married Kaitlyn Goalen.

Christensen has served as a board member of the Frankie Lemmon Foundation and is a co-chair of its annual fundraising event, Triangle Wine Experience. In 2020, she partnered with the Frankie Lemmon Foundation to establish a relief fund for restaurant workers impacted by the onset of COVID-19. She is also on the board for the Dix Park Conservancy and Shepherd's Table Soup Kitchen, which serves 200 to 300 meals daily to downtown Raleigh's food-insecure population. She is also an active member of the Southern Foodways Alliance and founded its biannual event Stir the Pot, in which she hosts visiting chefs in Raleigh to raise funds for the SFA's documentary initiatives.

An activist on women's issues, Christensen has been outspoken about sexual harassment in the culinary world and has written columns about the issue. Her own company, AC Restaurants, employed an HR specialist in 2012 to ensure that "situations between employees" can be dealt with "in a truly neutral manner". In 2020, a former employee alleged having been sexually assaulted multiple times by two different employees while working at Poole's in 2017. Christensen acknowledged failings in the company's policies and announced changes that the company was taking.
