= Van Hoy =

Van Hoy is a surname. Notable people with the surname include:

- Cameron Van Hoy (born 1985), American actor, producer, director, and writer
- Nikolaus van Hoy (1631–1679), Flemish Baroque painter

== See also ==
- Van Noy
