= Spizzico =

Restaurant information
- Food type: Fast food
- Location: Italy
- Other locations: France; Greece; Switzerland; United States
- Website: www.spizzico.it

Spizzico is a chain of franchised quick-service pizzeria owned by the Italian-based multinational catering company Autogrill.

== Locations ==
The chain currently has 169 restaurants in Italy, Greece, Switzerland, France, and the United States. Typical locations include motorway service areas, airports, railway stations, high streets, shopping malls, and trade fairs. Spizzico restaurants often share a site with other Autogrill fast-food restaurant chains located in the same building.

== Serving ==
Spizzico's staple offering consists of very large pizzas (far bigger than regular pizzeria-served or home-delivered ones) which are sold in eighth, quarter, or half slices with a variable number of toppings (some fixed, some seasonal, some special), together with pizza slices calzones, fried panzerotti and such other fast-food fare as fries, salads, soft drinks, and desserts. Meals can be eaten in the restaurant or taken out to consume elsewhere.

== See also ==
- List of Italian restaurants
