= Vannoy =

Vannoy is a surname. Notable people with the surname include:

- Henry Vannoy (1819–1889), French actor and playwright
- Henry Clay VanNoy (1881–1938), American businessman
- Robin Ransom Vannoy (born 1967), American judge

== See also ==
- Van Noy
