= Haikou International Duty-Free City Shopping Complex =

Duty-free shop in Haikou, Hainan, China

Coordinates: 20.0514°N 110.1570°E

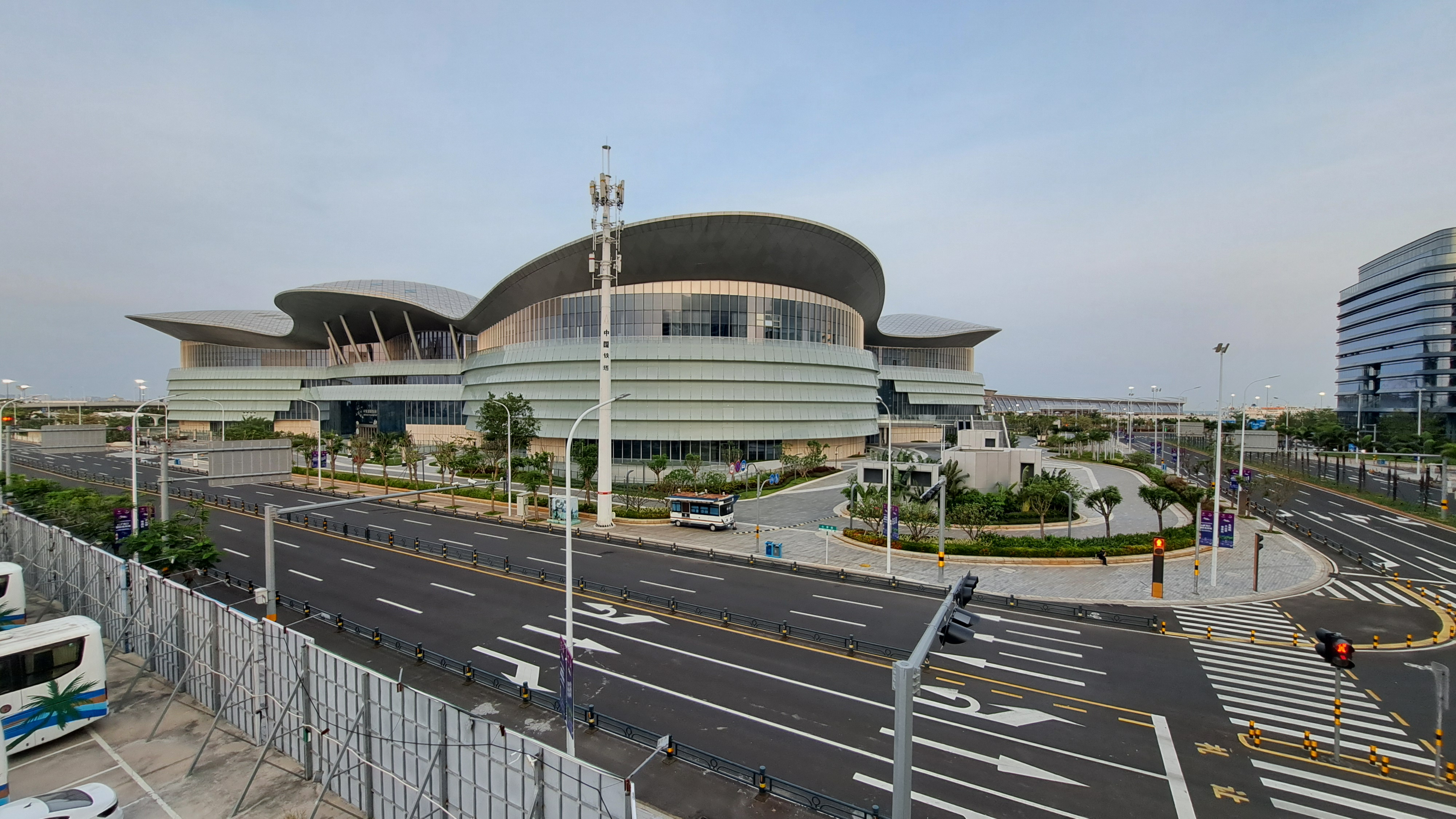
- Industry: Duty-free shop
- Founded: 2022 (4 years ago)
- Headquarters: Haikou
- Area served: Haikou

The Haikou International Duty-Free City Shopping Complex is a 280,000 m^{2} duty-free shopping complex located in Haikou, Hainan, China about 100 metres southeast of Haikou Port New Seaport. It is the world's largest duty free complex.

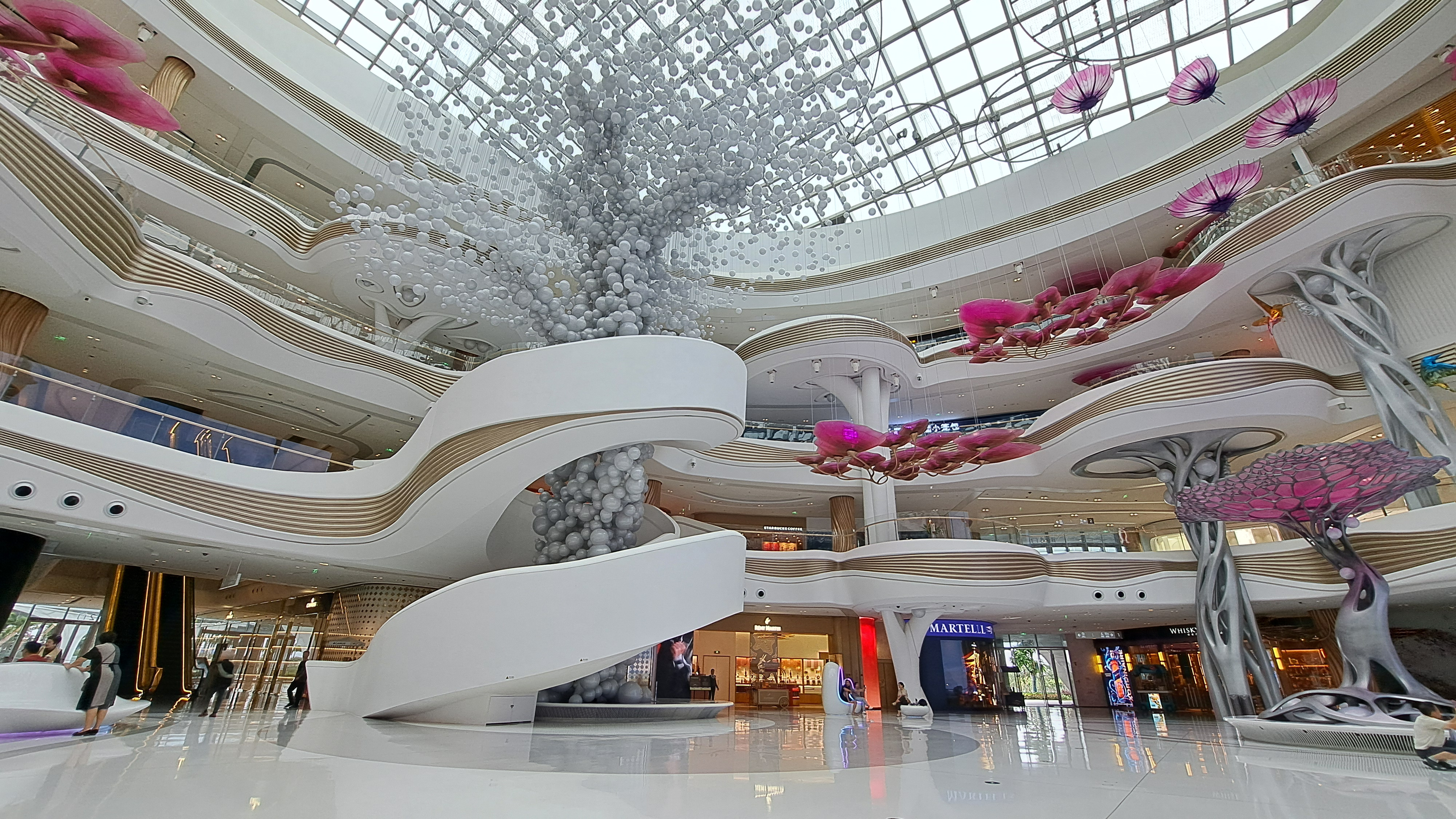
Interior

== See also ==
- List of duty-free shops
