= Henry Clay VanNoy =

Henry Clay Van Noy (April 20, 1881 – November 28, 1938) was a prominent Kansas City, Missouri, businessman and was the last surviving member of the legendary Van Noy Brothers of Kansas City - brothers who founded the company which a century later has evolved into HMSHost company. Born to Dr. Henry Clay Van Noy and Catherine S. Raber, he is also the great-grandson of Barbourville, Kentucky, pioneer William Van Noy.

In 1897, the Van Noy Brothers - who included Ira Clinton, Charles S., and Horace Greeley, founded what was to become the Van Noy Railway News and Hotel Company. With humble beginnings, in time the Van Noy Brothers built the company, later known as the Van Noy Interstate Co., into one of the country's larger restaurant, hotel, and railroad service chains. Today, the Van Noy Railway News and Hotel Company is known as HMSHost - owned by Autogrill S.p.A.
