= Host Hotels & Resorts =

International hotel company in Bethesda, Maryland, United States

Host Hotels & Resorts, Inc.

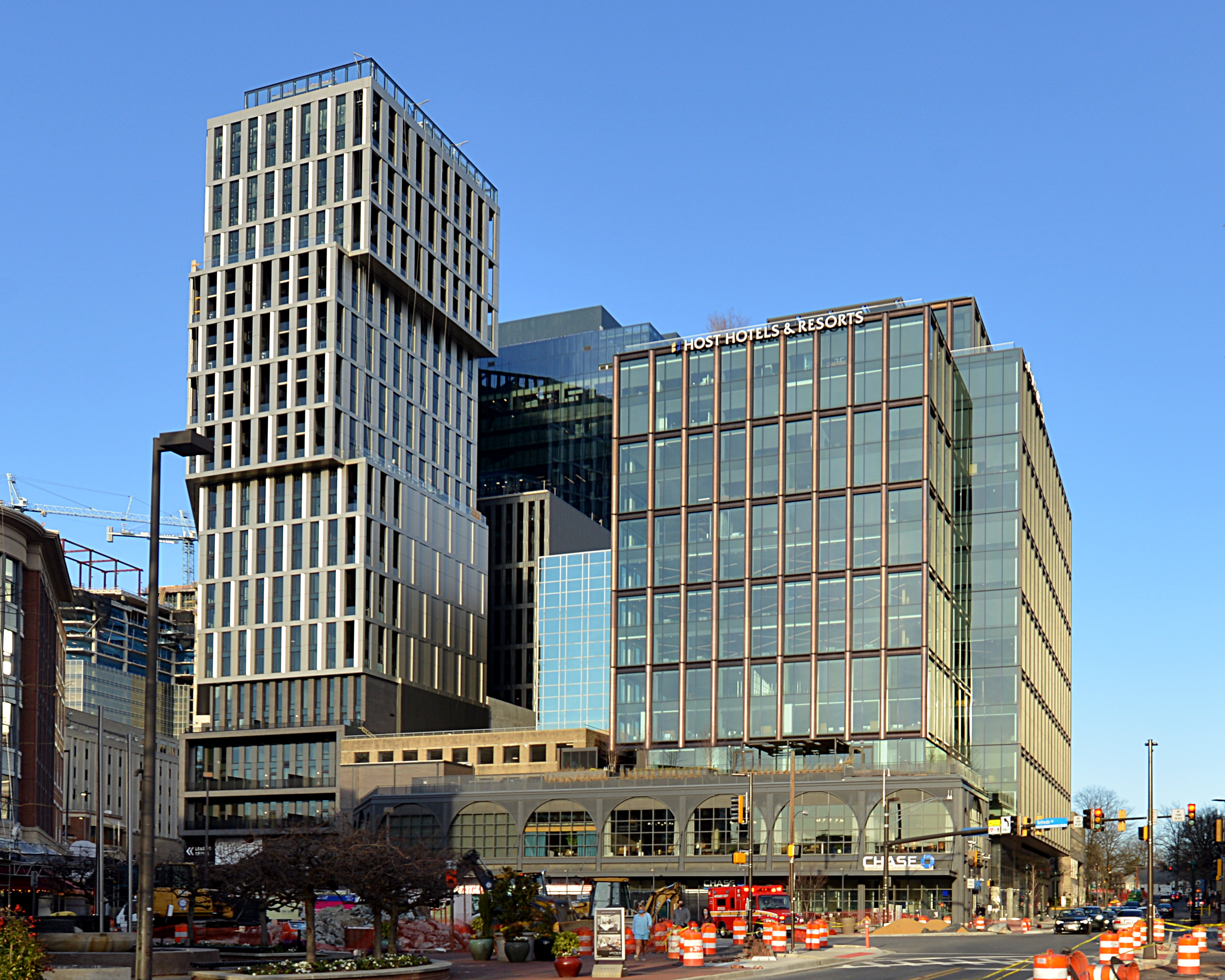
- Corporate headquarters
- Formerly: Host Marriott Corporation (1993–2005)
- Type: Public
- Traded as: Nasdaq: HST; S&P 500 component
- Industry: Real estate investment trust
- Predecessor: Marriott Corporation
- Founded: 1993; 33 years ago
- Headquarters: Bethesda, Maryland, U.S.
- Key people: Richard E. Marriott (chairman); James F. Risoleo (president & CEO); Sourav Ghosh (CFO)
- Revenue: ▲US$6.11 billion (2025)
- Net income: ▲US$765 million (2025)
- Total assets: ▲US$13.0 billion (2025)
- Total equity: ▼US$6.56 billion (2025)
- Number of employees: 165 (2025)
- Website: hosthotels.com

Host Hotels & Resorts, Inc. is an American real estate investment trust that invests in hotels. The company is based in Bethesda, Maryland. As of December 31, 2024, the company owned 81 upscale hotels with approximately 43,400 rooms in the United States, Brazil, and Canada.

== History ==
In 1897, the Van Noy Brothers of Kansas City, Missouri, formed Van Noy Railway News and Hotel Company to operate news stands along the Missouri Pacific and other regional railroads. The company expanded to various hospitality services, including hotels. After several name and business changes, it became the Host International Company in 1968.

In 1927, John Willard Marriott and his wife Alice opened a root beer stand in Washington, D.C., named “The Hot Shoppe”. It became a public company and in 1957, Hot Shoppes, Inc. expanded into the lodging business with the opening of its first hotel in Arlington, Virginia. In 1967, the company was renamed as Marriott Corporation.

In 1982, Marriott acquired the Host International Company.

In 1993, Marriott split its business into Marriott International, Inc., which took over management and franchising, and Host Marriott Corporation, which became the new name for the original Marriott Corporation. Host Marriott managed lodging and travel concessions at airports, and along turnpikes and interstate highways. The concession businesses were further spun off as Host Marriott Services, now HMSHost.

In 1998, the company divested its non-hotel business and reorganized as a real estate investment trust. In 2006, the company adopted its current name, Host Hotels & Resorts, Inc.

In April 2024, Host Hotels & Resorts acquired the 1 Hotel Nashville and the Embassy Suites by Hilton Nashville Downtown. Later that year, Host Hotels & Resorts acquired 1 Hotel Central Park in New York City from Starwood Capital Group.
