= James Richardson Corporation =

James Richardson Group
- Industry: Furniture; Real estate Duty-free retail
- Founded: 1892 (early company); 1955 (merger to form current company)
- Founders: Jimmy Richardson (early company); David Mandie (modern company)
- Headquarters: Abbotsford, Australia
- Areas served: Australasia, Middle East
- Key people: Evelyn Danos (Executive Chairman); Milton Lasnitzki (CEO); Garry Stock (Duty Free Chairman)
- Number of employees: 2,300
- Website: http://www.jamesrichardson.com.au/

The James Richardson Corporation, also going by the name James Richardson Group or JR/Group, is an Australian furniture, hospitality, real estate and retail corporation, headquartered in the Abbotsford suburb of Melbourne, Australia. It is privately owned and employs approximately 2,300 people worldwide. It is perhaps best known among consumers for its duty-free retail stores in airports and border crossings in Australasia and the Middle East. The company is a household name in Israel due to its duty-free stores in Terminal 3 of Ben Gurion Airport.

== History ==
Scottish-born James Richardson (c. 1864–1951) immigrated from Ayrshire to New South Wales in 1886 and worked at the Wentworth Hotel, Sydney before relocating to Melbourne as a barman at Hotel Windsor. By July 1916 Richardson was the proprietor of two wine and spirits stores in Melbourne. In 1928 he commissioned the building of the Hotel Alexander, which became the seventh in his hotel chain and along with his four wine and spirit shops made him "the biggest figure in Australia's hotel trade." He sold off five hotels in 1944 and when he died in August 1951 he was "worth approximately £2 million."

== Duty-free retail ==
=== Australia and New Zealand ===
Eight duty-free stores in Australia and three in New Zealand operate under the trade name JR/Duty Free. Seven are located inside international airports and four in major city centres.

James Richardson first began duty-free retailing in Australia in 1972, opening a single store at Brisbane Airport. The company expanded over the next two decades, opening further duty-free stores in Sydney Airport, Melbourne Airport, Perth Airport and Cairns Airport, and twenty-three stores in all major city centres. The company sold this entire operation to Swissair in 1995, choosing instead to concentrate on the furniture and textiles business and the company's Israeli duty-free retail operation.

Ten years later, the company, this time trading under its current trade name, JR/Duty Free, again reentered the Australian market, opening city centre duty-free stores in Melbourne, Perth, Adelaide, and later Brisbane, and winning a ten-year concession to operate at Darwin Airport from February 2007.

In 2009, JR/Duty Free was awarded one of the available duty-free concessions in Auckland Airport in New Zealand, and purchased the duty-free concession at Wellington International Airport from a rival firm. Both operations commenced in July of that year, and in 2010, another store opened in Christchurch International Airport.

Over the last few years, JR/Duty Free has continued to expand, reopening stores in Cairns Airport in March 2012, Perth Airport in November 2013, and most recently, Brisbane Airport in September 2014.

=== Israel ===
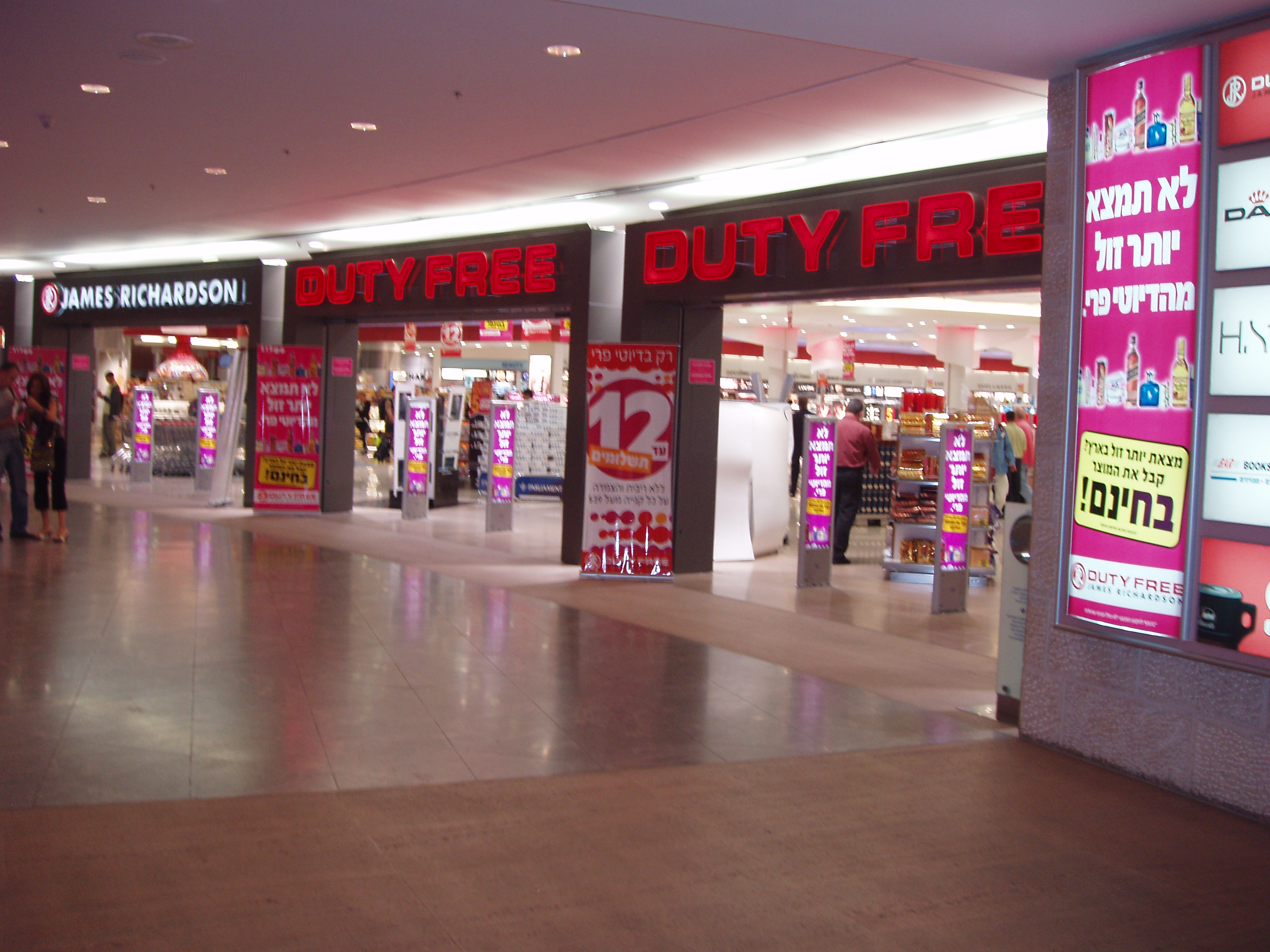
James Richardson Duty Free store in the airside rotunda of Ben Gurion Airport Terminal 3, Israel, May 2006

In 1987, the Israel Airports Authority issued a tender for a total area of more than 1,000 square metres (of retail space) (at Ben Gurion Airport). Five companies bid for the tender and James Richardson was the winner.

The company stores in Israel officially opened on 14 November 1988. The company has invested hundreds of thousands of dollars (into the venture), including a new store with an 800-square metre cosmetics and perfume area, a 300-square metre consumer electronics area, a 150-square metre watch store and a 150-square metre fashion area.

Turnover has increased continuously since the start of operations. Total sales in the first year were about 20 million US dollars, while in recent years the total sales in Israel today is over 400 million: an increase of about 2,000% in 20 years.

There are now eight James Richardson duty-free stores in Terminal 3 of Ben-Gurion Airport. In addition, James Richardson operates duty-free stores at the Allenby Bridge border crossing with Jordan, the Taba Border Crossing with Egypt, and operates at the ports of Haifa and Ashdod - including providing supplies for ships crews, and warehouses for supplies for UN forces and diplomats.

The company also operates a store in Haifa Airport, in cruise ships of the Israeli cruise line Mano, and the duty-free carts on Arkia and Israir flights.

In 1989, James Richardson pioneered a shopping storage and pickup service, which led to increased sales and was subsequently adopted by the company in its other stores in Australia and New Zealand. The service was the brainchild of Ze'ev Sarig, then responsible for security at Ben Gurion Airport (and later became its managing director). The idea came to him after buying a bottle of whiskey on his way abroad. The service allows passengers to make duty-free purchases before leaving the country, store them at the airport, and receive them upon their return. The service was first implemented in August 1989, and within two months it had already been used by some 8,000 passengers.

=== Other ===
James Richardson has an interest in Tahiti Duty Free located within Fa'a'ā International Airport in Tahiti.

== See also ==
- List of duty-free shops
