= World Duty Free =

Multinational travel retailer

- Type: Società per azioni
- Industry: Retail, Consumer Services
- Founded: 2013
- Headquarters: Novara, Italy
- Key people: Gianmario Tondato da Ruos (Chairman); Eugenio Andrades (CEO)
- Revenue: €2 billion (2013)
- Owner: Avolta
- Number of employees: 8,500
- Website: www.worlddutyfreegroup.com

World Duty Free SpA, the holding company of World Duty Free Group, is an Italy-based multinational travel retailer that employs almost 8,500 people.

== History ==
=== Beginnings ===
World Duty Free Group was created after the Autogrill Group, the old parent company, acquired and integrated the business lines of Aldeasa, World Duty Free and Alpha Group, which were complementary in terms of market segment and geographical regions.

Aldeasa began retailing in Spanish airports in 1976. Alpha Airport Shopping has had a presence in airports in the United Kingdom in different guises since the very early days of airport retailing in 1955, while World Duty Free was founded by Heathrow Airport Holdings (BAA) to run tax and duty free operations in all its airports in the United Kingdom.

=== Expansion and consolidation ===
In the decade following the abolition of duty free within the EU in 1999, the three separate businesses, Aldeasa, Alpha and World Duty Free Europe, were acquired by the Italian company Autogrill S.p.A. After acquiring Aldeasa (50% in 2005 and the remaining 50% in 2008) and World Duty Free Europe(2008), Autogrill Group started a process to integrate them with the Alpha Group Travel Retail division (acquired in 2007). This process led to the set up in 2011 of the new World Duty Free Group, which controlled all Autogrill Group's Travel Retail and Duty Free business. The company became one global organization in 2011, formed of European airport retailers Aldeasa and WDF, and the experience in the industry dates back to the 1950s.

In September 2013, Autogrill completed the transfer of the US Travel Retail Division from HMS and its subsidiary Host International to WDFG.

=== Demerger and listed ===
On 6 June 2013, the Shareholders of Autogrill approved the project of proportional partial demerger whereby Autogrill S.p.A. transferred the Travel Retail and Duty Free business to its wholly owned subsidiary World Duty Free S.p.A. (parent company of World Duty Free Group), the beneficiary, by assigning to the latter the entire shareholding in the Group's Travel Retail and Duty Free business.

On 30 August 2013, World Duty Free S.p.A. filed an application for the listing of its ordinary shares on the Mercato Telematico Azionario (electronic stock market) organized and managed by Borsa Italiana S.p.A. On 1 October 2013, World Duty Free has listed on the Borsa Italia in Milan, marking the culmination of the demerger process from parent group Autogrill.

=== Discrimination against Chinese customers ===
In February 2018, a World Duty Free shop in Heathrow Airport triggered outcry in China and was criticised by state-run media after apparently being caught discriminating against the country's passengers. The accusations emerged after an employee at retailer World Duty Free alleged they had seen the store offer 20 percent VIP discount vouchers to customers spending £79 or more, while telling passengers travelling to China they had to spend £1,000 to qualify.

== World Duty Free Group ==
World Duty Free Group operates in more than 550 stores and duty-free shops in 20 countries. It is present with a substantial international presence in the European airport retail heartlands of Spain and United Kingdom and in the Middle East, North America, Latin America.

In November 2013, World Duty Free Group won the tender to operate 11 stores at Helsinki Vantaa Airport – the retailer's first business in the Nordic region. Thanks to it, WDFG operates four duty free and duty paid store, including two walkthrough shops, offering the core categories of beauty, liquor, tobacco and confectionery. The group operates around 2,500sq m for the core categories. It also operates seven specialty stores, totaling approximately 600sq m, focused on luxury product categories. WDFG operations started at Helsinki Airport in March 2014. The first of the newly renovated shops opened in 2015.

In November 2014 Eugenio Andrades was appointed CEO, following the announcement of former CEO José Maria Palencia's resignation.

In November 2015, the company was taken over by Dufry and shares in the group were delisted from the MIB.

== See also ==
- List of duty-free shops
