= Van Noy =

Van Noy is a surname. Notable people with the surname include:

- Jay Van Noy (1928–2010), American baseball player
- Junior Van Noy (1924–1943), American soldier
  - Junior N. Van Noy (ship)
- Kyle Van Noy (born 1991), American football player
- Zachi Noy
- Henry Clay Van Noy

== See also ==
- Vannoy
