= AC Restaurants =

Horeca chain in the Netherlands

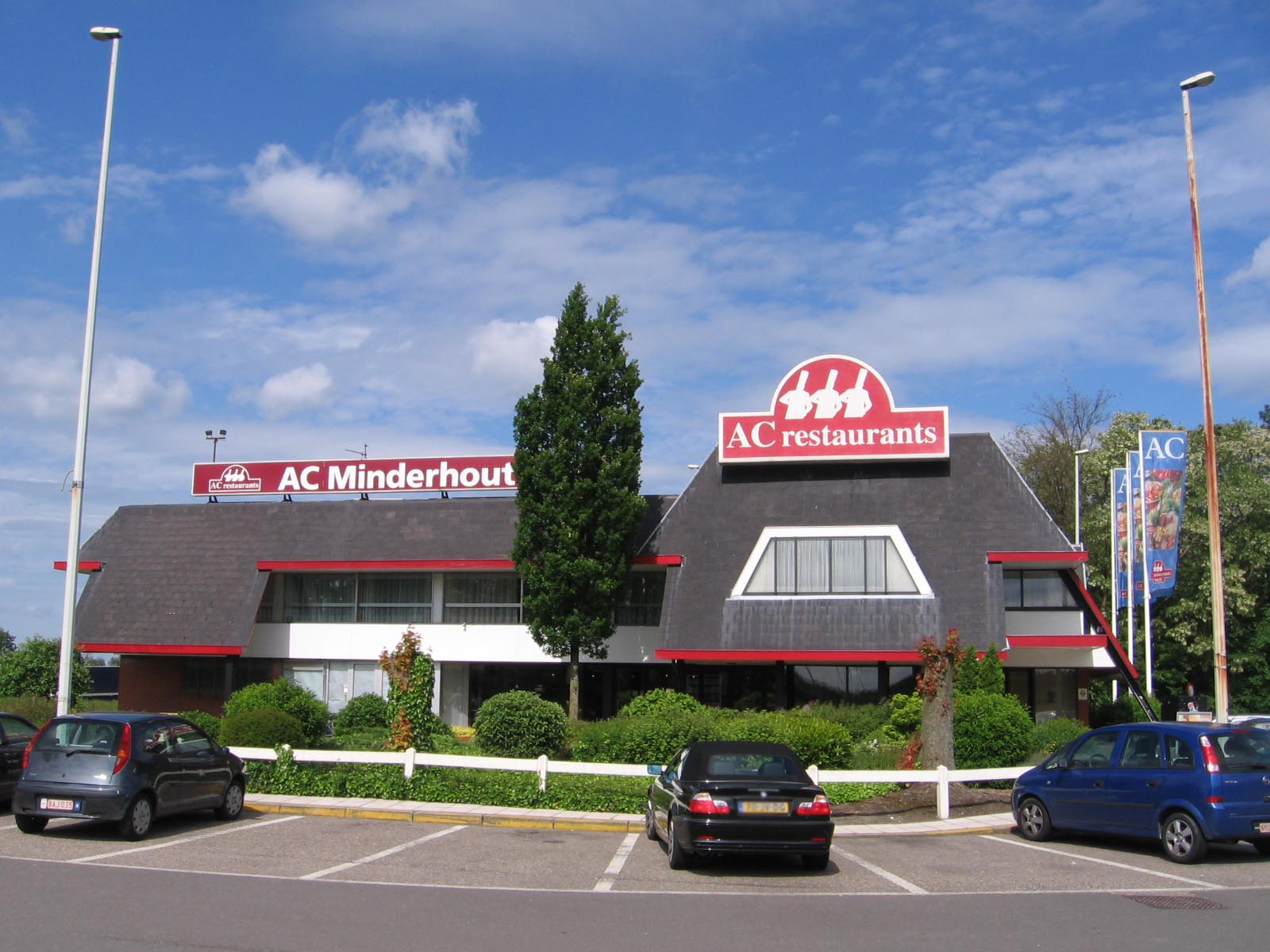
- An AC restaurant in Minderhout, Belgium
- Founded: 1963
- Services: Hotels and restaurants
- Owner: Autogrill

AC Restaurants en Hotels is a horeca chain that was founded in 1963 in the Netherlands. There are 40 chains of the company including 12 hotels, mainly with Groupe du Louvre.

== History ==
In 1963 AC Restaurants was started as a part of the retailer corporation Albert Heijn (later Ahold). The letter combination AC stands for Alberts Corner.

Since 1998 AC Restaurants & Hotels was bought by the Italian corporation Autogrill. Autogrill is controlled by Schematrentaquattro S.R.L. a company of the Benetton family, including through Sintonia SA is the main shareholder of the Italian motorway Autostrade SpA.

== Locations by country ==
| Country | Number of restaurants | Location |
|---|---|---|
| Belgium | 6 | Restaurant and Hotel Arlon; Restaurant and Hotel Arlux, Arlon; Restaurant and Motel Ruisbroek (2 locations); Restaurant Sprimont (2 location); Restaurant Wanlin; Restaurant and Hotel Wavre |
| Netherlands | 34 | Restaurants with Hotel: Restaurant and Hotel Holten (AC Hotel); Restaurant and Hotel Meerkerk (as a part of Tulip Inn); Restaurant and Hotel Amsterdam (as a part of Tulip Inn); Restaurant and Hotel Bodegraven (as a part of Tulip Inn); Restaurant and Hotel Leiderdorp (as a part of Tulip Inn); Restaurant and Hotel Oosterhout (as a part of Tulip Inn); Restaurant and Hotel Sevenum (as a part of Tulip Inn); Restaurants: Restaurant Apeldoorn; Restaurant Hendrik-Ido-Ambacht; Restaurant Nederweert Noord en Zuid; Restaurant Nieuwegein; Restaurant Stroe; Restaurant 't Harde; Restaurant Veenendaal; Restaurant Venray; Restaurant Zevenaar |
