= Autogrill =

Italian company

Autogrill S.p.A.
- Type: Public
- Traded as: BIT: AGL
- Industry: Catering
- Founded: 1977; 49 years ago
- Headquarters: Rozzano, Italy
- Key people: Paolo Roverato (chairman); Gianmario Tondato Da Ruos (CEO)
- Products: Foodservice at service areas, airport terminals, train stations, ports
- Revenue: € 2.0 billion (2020)
- Number of employees: 31,092 (2020)
- Parent: Avolta (2023–present)
- Subsidiaries
- Website: autogrill.com

Autogrill S.p.A. is an Italian multinational catering company, which was controlled with a 50.1% stake by the Edizione Holding investment vehicle of the Benetton family. Over 90% of the company's business derives from outlets in airport terminals and motorway service areas.

It runs operations in 30 countries, primarily in Europe and North America, with over 300 licensed and proprietary brands.

On February 6, 2023, Dufry acquired a controlling interest in the company.

== History ==
Autogrill was founded in 1977 when SME, a division of Italian state-owned conglomerate Istituto per la Ricostruzione Industriale (IRI), merged the Italian restaurant groups Motta, Pavesi and Alemagna. Pavesi had begun to operate a service area on the Milan-Novara motorway A4 in 1947, replacing it with a bridge-restaurant accessible by travellers in both directions fifteen years later. During the expansion of the autostrada network after 1955 Pavesi's competitors Motta and Alemagna were too permitted to open restaurants at motorway service areas along the new built highways. In 1974 the privately owned restaurant chains got loss-making. As closing the restaurants wasn't realistic the groups sold their restaurants to IRI.

Having grown both domestically and through foreign acquisitions, Autogrill was privatised by the Italian Government in 1995 as IRI shed its food and beverage businesses. Edizione Holding, the financial holding company of the Benetton family, acquired a controlling stake through the process.

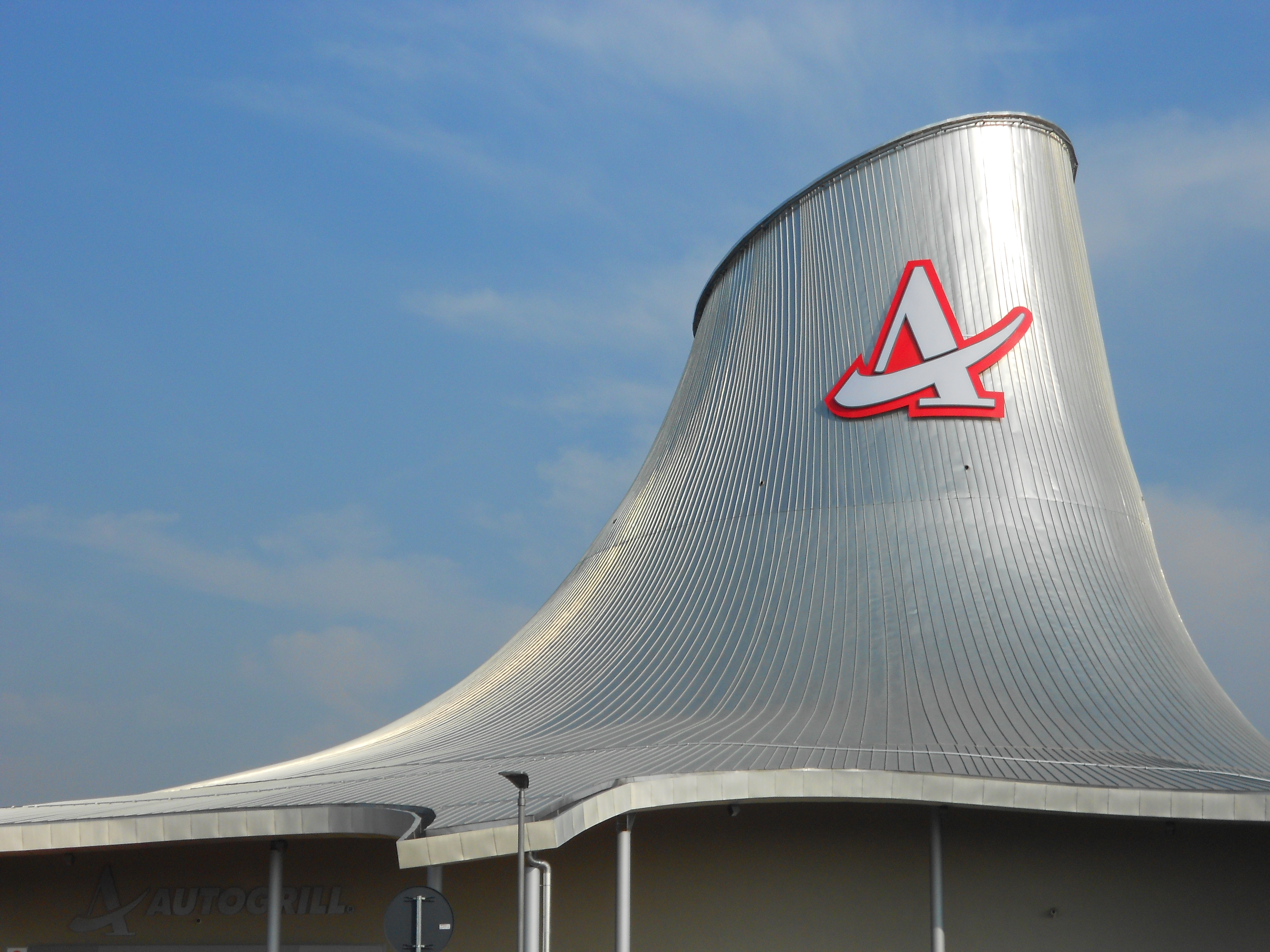
Ecogrill by Giulio Ceppi - Autogrill, Lainate (Milan)

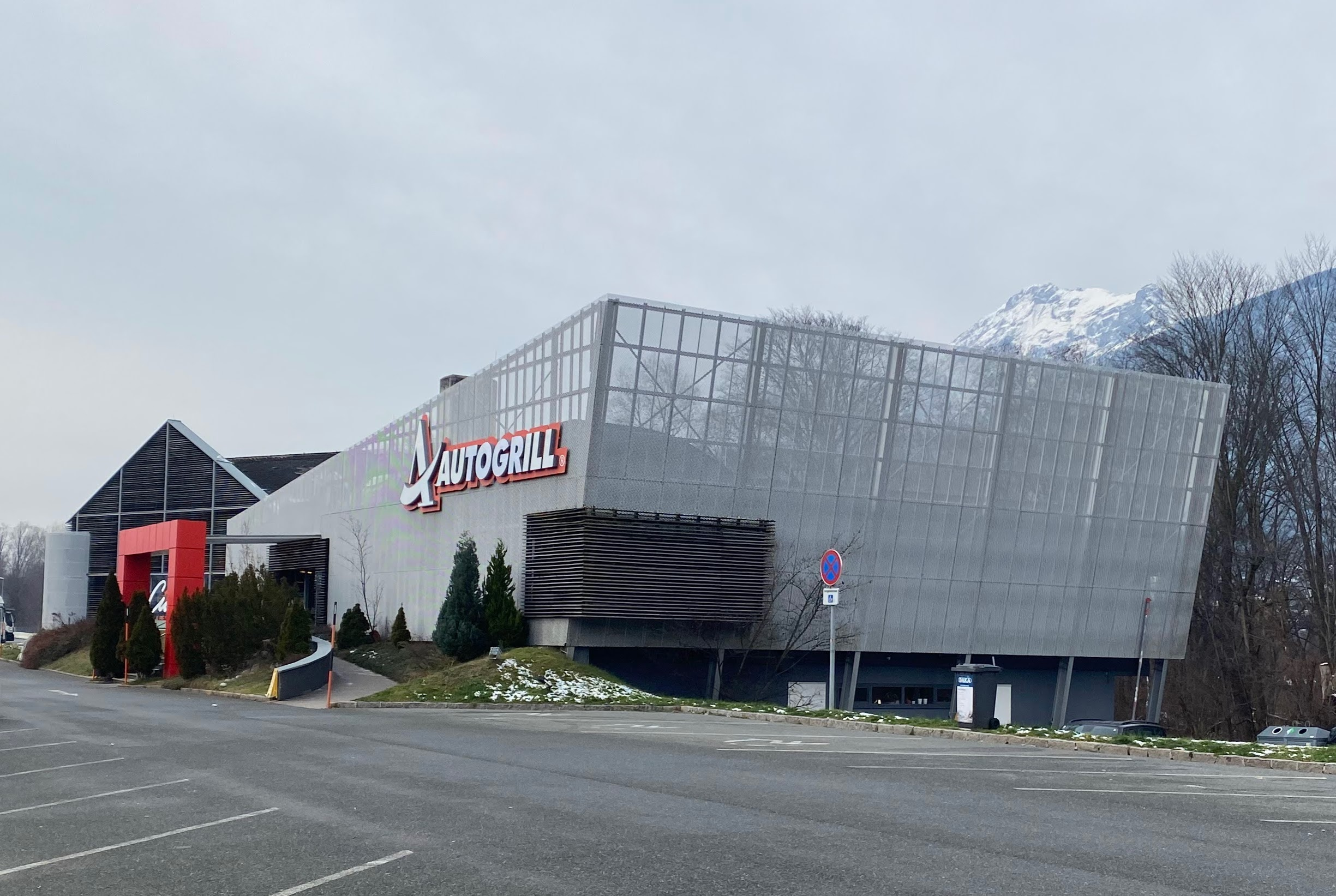
Autogrill in Weer, Austria

Edizione floated the company on the Milan Stock Exchange in 1997, sparking a series of acquisitions in overseas markets: by the end of 1998, Autogrill had secured full control of French operator Sogerba (previously owned by Granada Group); AC Restaurants and Hotels of Benelux as well as 14 branches of the Wienerwald chain in Austria and Germany.

=== Travel Retail and Duty Free business ===
In July 1999 the group made its first entry into both the United States and airport concession markets by acquiring Host Marriott Services, which was then renamed HMSHost. Other major acquisitions by the group included the Swiss firm Passaggio (completed in 2001), 70% of high-speed train station operator Receco in 2002, Spanish-based airport duty-free retailer Aldeasa in 2005 (50-50 with Altadis) and Belgium's Carestel (completed in 2007). Autogrill acquired the remaining 50% in Aldeasa for complete control in 2008. It also purchased Alpha Group and World Duty Free Europe in 2008 and merged them with Aldeasa in 2011 to create World Duty Free Group, a super-retailer at Airports. In 2010, it had €785 million in sales in the United Kingdom and €494 million in sales in Spain.

==== Demerger to WDF ====
On 6 June 2013, Autogrill approved the project of proportional partial demerger whereby Autogrill S.p.A. transferred the Travel Retail and Duty Free business to its wholly owned subsidiary World Duty Free S.p.A. (parent company of World Duty Free Group), the beneficiary, by assigning to the latter the entire shareholding in the Group's Travel Retail and Duty Free business.

On 1 October 2013, World Duty Free has listed on the Borsa Italiana in Milan, marking the culmination of the demerger process from parent group Autogrill.

== See also ==
- Spizzico
