= HMSHost =

Operator of airport concession services

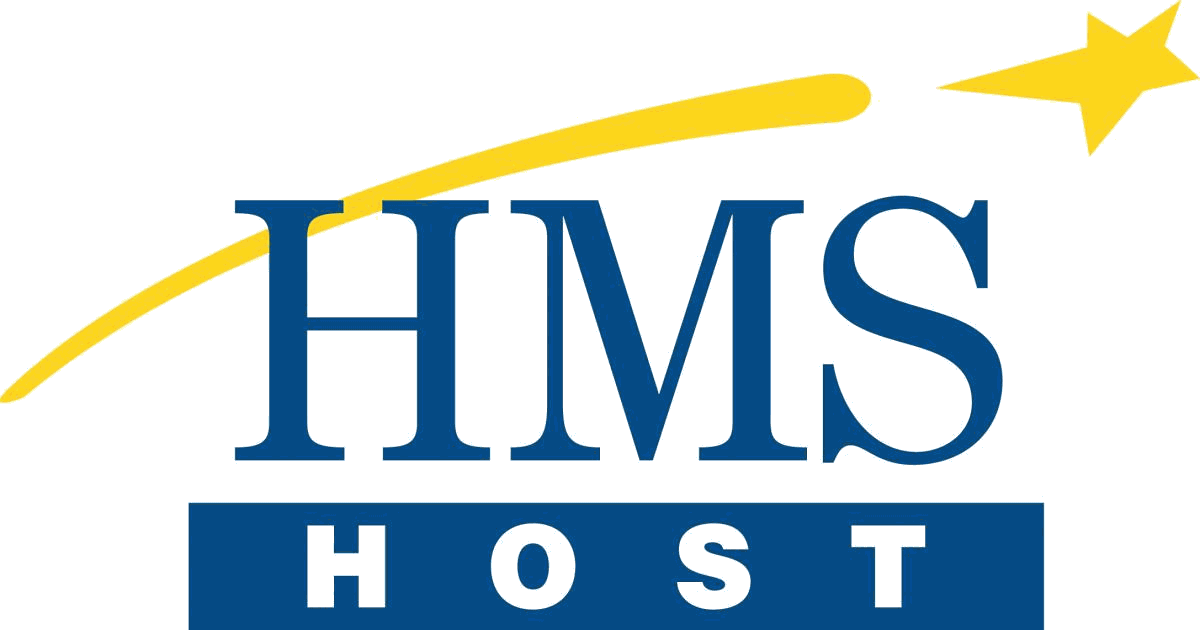
- Company type: Subsidiary
- Predecessor: Host Marriott Corporation
- Founded: 1897; 129 years ago, in Kansas City, Missouri
- Founder: Van Noy Brothers
- Headquarters: North Bethesda, Maryland (Bethesda mailing address), U.S.
- Area served: North America, Middle East, Europe, and Africa
- Key people: Steve Johnson (CEO)
- Parent: Avolta
- Website: www.hmshost.com

HMSHost is an American highway and airport food-service company, a wholly owned subsidiary of the Swiss company Avolta. As of 2014, Steve Johnson is the CEO of HMSHost.

== History ==
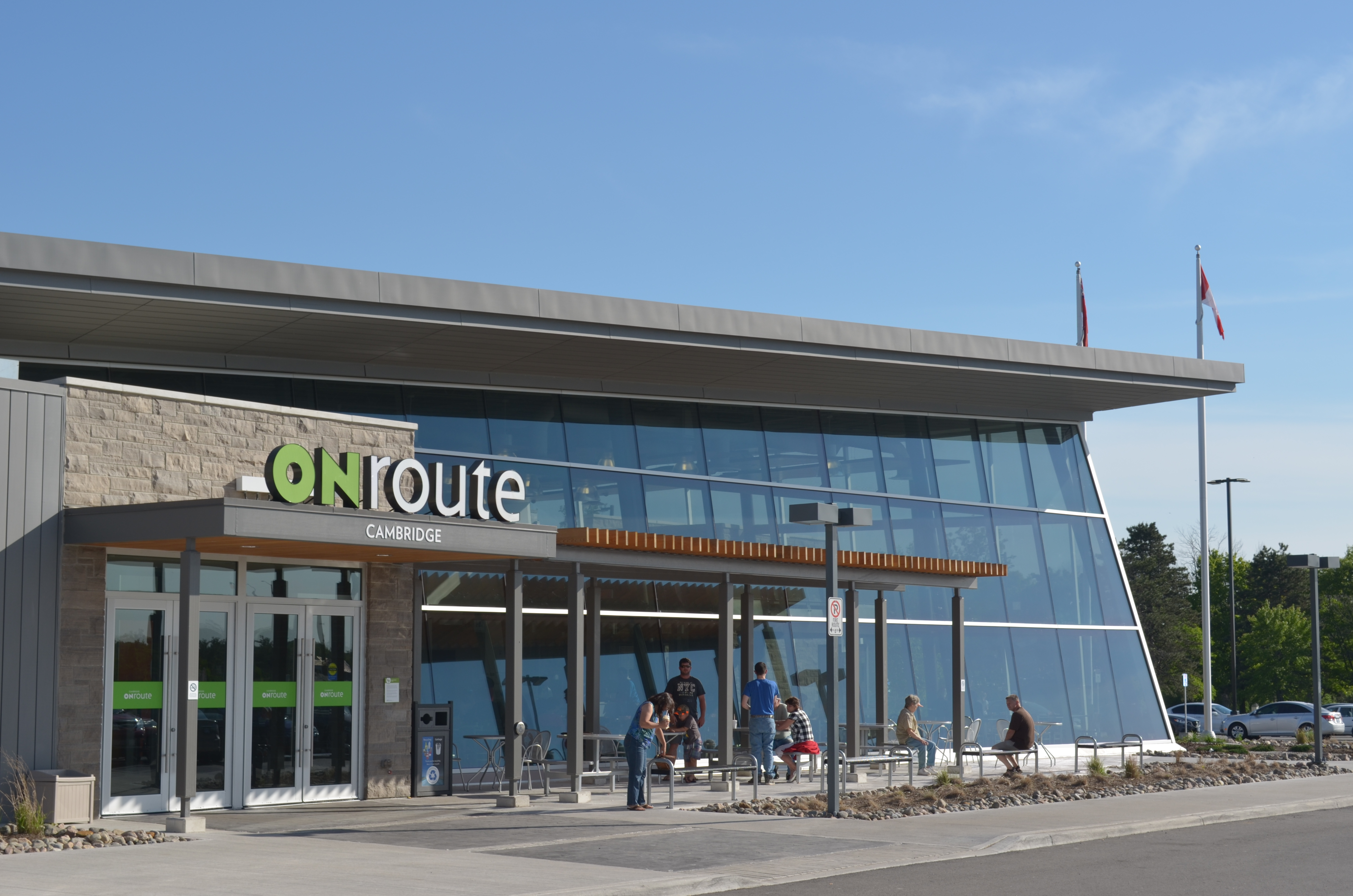
An ONroute location in Ontario

The company's origins are in the Van Noy Railway News and Hotel Company founded in 1897 by the Van Noy Brothers of Kansas City, Missouri.

On January 2, 1996, Host Marriott Services Corporation was created when Host Marriott Corporation divided into two separate companies. Host Marriott continued to own lodging real estate. Host Marriott Services Corporation held and operates concessions at airports, at rest stops on toll roads and freeways and at sports and entertainment attractions. Autogrill S.p.A. acquired the company in 1999, creating HMSHost. Dufry acquired the company from Autogrill in early 2023.

Along the way, the company grew through its many acquisitions. It found itself with airport contracts in 18 of the 20 largest airports in the United States. Through Kilmer Host Service Centres, a joint venture with the Canadian company Kilmer van Nostrand, HMSHost was also a partner in ONroute service centres in the Canadian province of Ontario from 2010 to 2019. Today the company manages franchise locations in 120 airports across North America and 80 highway stops in the northeastern and midwestern United States.

In 2021, HMSHost sold their United States toll road service area operations to Iris Buyer, LLC, a consortium of Blackstone Infrastructure Partners and Applegreen for $375 million.

== See also ==
- Van Noy Railway News and Hotel Company
