= List of duty-free shops =

This is a list of duty-free shops. A duty-free shop is a retail outlet that is exempt from the payment of certain local or national taxes and duties, on the requirement that the goods sold will be sold to travelers who will take them out of the country. Which products can be sold duty-free vary by jurisdiction, as well as how they can be sold, and the process of calculating the duty or refunding the duty component.

== Duty-free shops ==
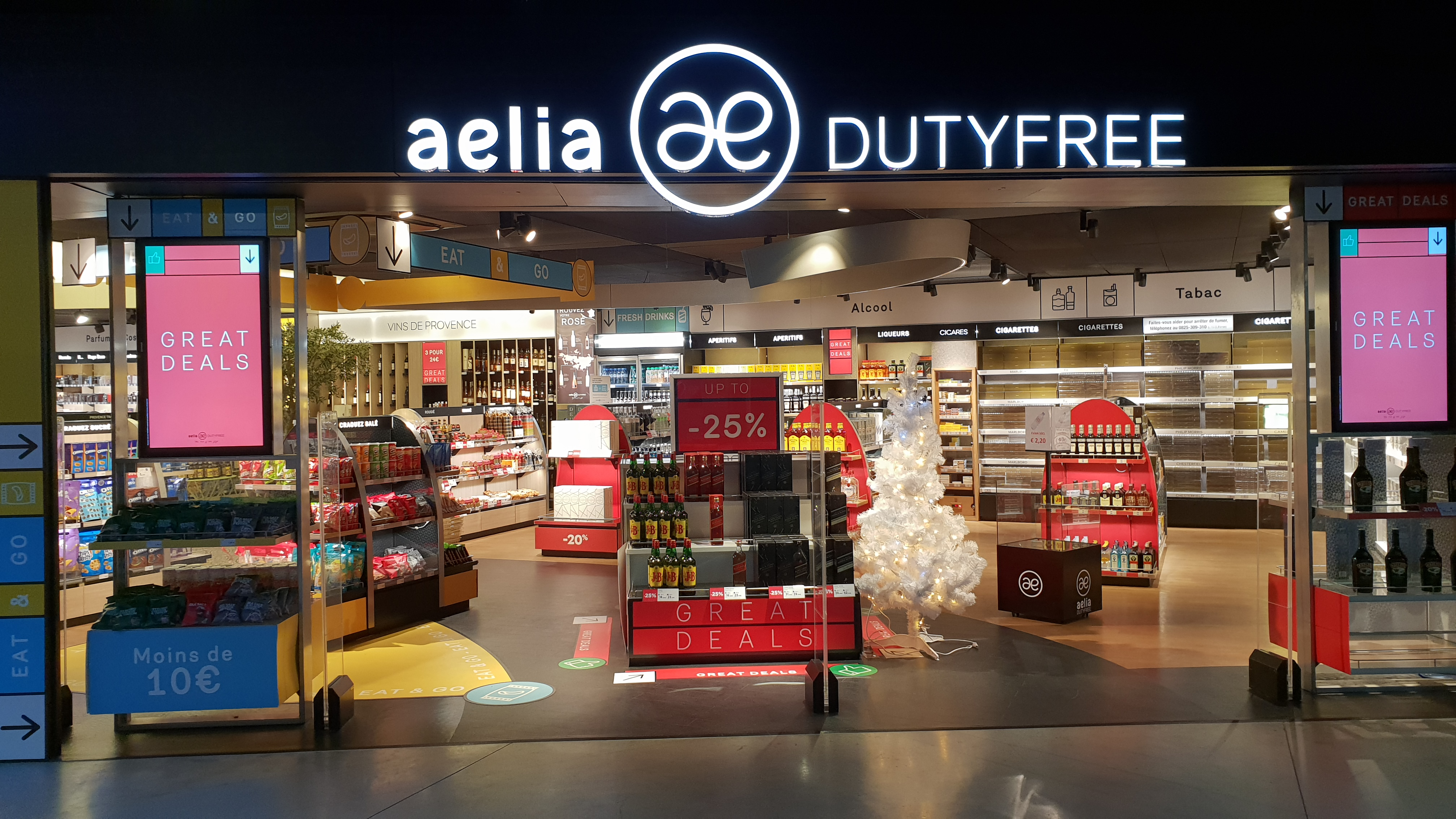
An Aelia Duty Free store at Marseille Provence Airport

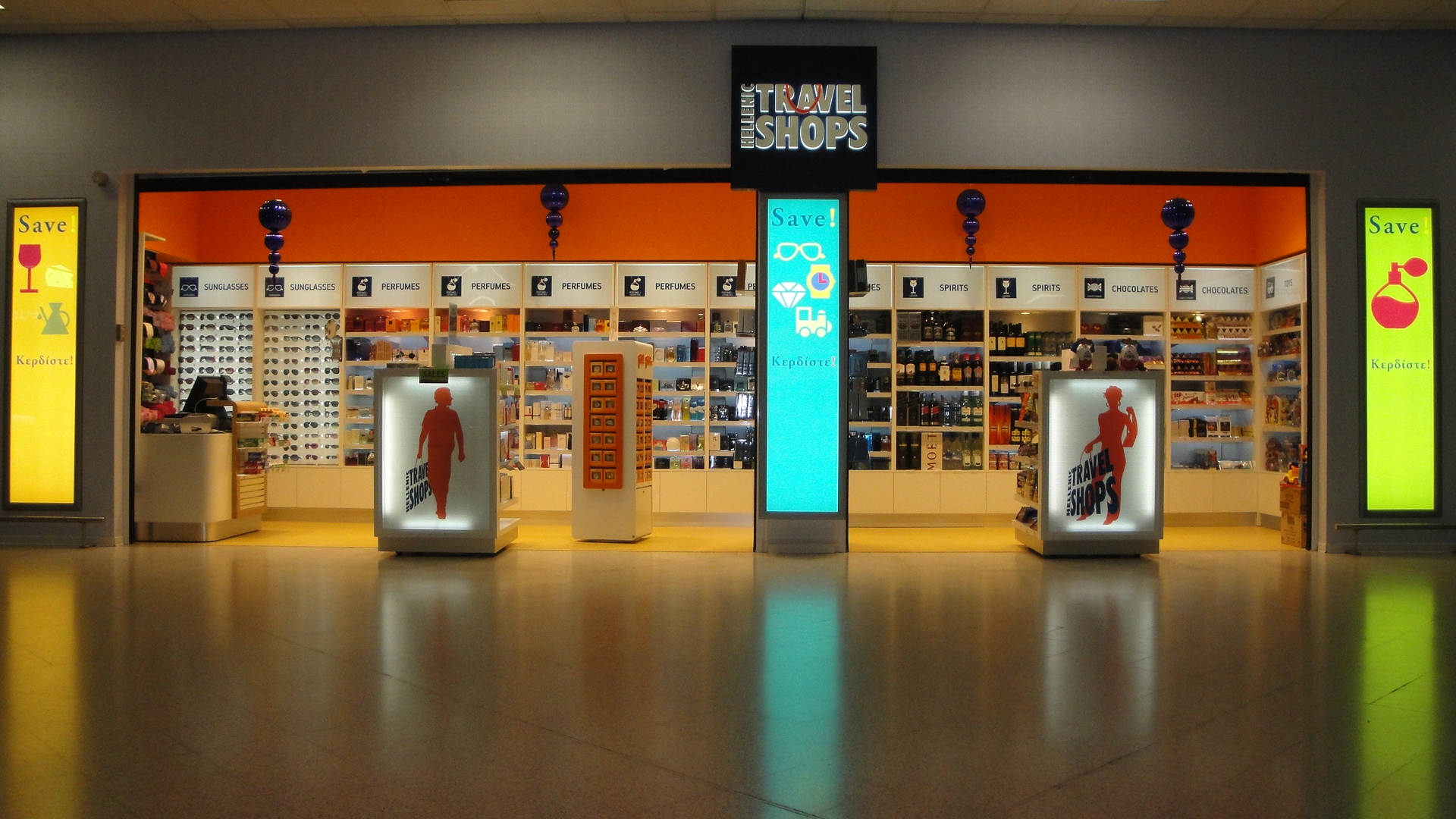
A Hellenic Duty Free Shops store at Athens International Airport

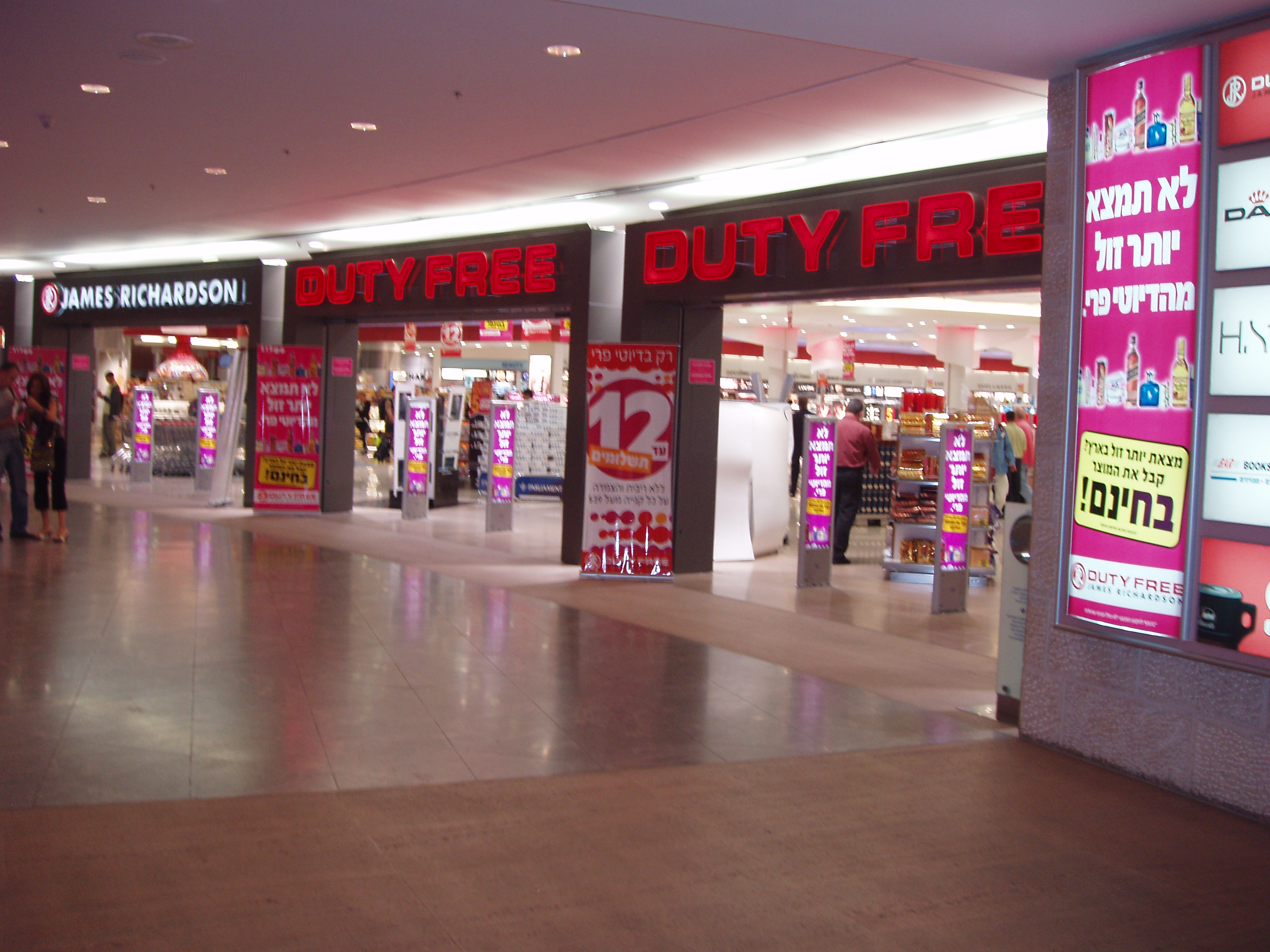
A James Richardson Duty Free store in the airside rotunda of Ben Gurion Airport Terminal 3, Israel, May 2006

- Haikou International Duty-Free City Shopping Complex, is the world's biggest stand-alone duty-free store in terms of physical size. Located in Haikou, Hainan, China, the buildings have a total area of 280,000 square meters.
- Aelia Duty Free – a brand of Lagardère Travel Retail.
- Comturist – a chain of duty-free stores. It was formerly a chain of hard currency luxury shops that existed in Communist Romania, managed by the Ministry of Tourism. After the 1989 Romanian revolution, these stores became obsolete and were sold off in 1991 to private business owners; as a result of this sale by auction, the Comturist name is still in existence today as a chain of duty-free shops.
- DFS Group – a global travel retailer of luxury products established in 1960 based in Hong Kong. Its network consists of stores located in major global airports and downtown locations. It is privately held and majority owned by the luxury conglomerate Moët Hennessy Louis Vuitton (LVMH), alongside DFS co-founder and shareholder Robert Miller. As of January 11, 1997, DFS Group operates as a subsidiary of LVMH.
- Dubai Duty Free – the company responsible for the duty-free operations at Dubai International Airport. DDF became the largest airport retailer in the world in terms of sales in 2012. DDF represents over 5% of global duty-free sales, generating 2014 revenues of $1.91 billion and 2016 revenues of $1.85 billion. It began operations at Dubai International Airport in December 1983.
- Dufry – a Swiss-based travel retailer operating around 2,200 duty-free and duty-paid shops in airports, cruise lines, seaports, railway stations and central tourist areas. Dufry employs almost 29,000 people. The company, headquartered in Basel, Switzerland, operates in over 68 countries worldwide.
  - World Duty Free – the holding company of World Duty Free Group, is an Italy-based multinational travel retailer that employs almost 8,500 people. Since 1 October 2013, the company is a constituent of the FTSE MIB index with the ticker symbol WDF:IM.
  - Hellenic Duty Free Shops – founded in 1979, it is a company in the travel retail industry that sells taxed and duty-free goods from brand name products to travelers passing through Greece's exit points. The company holds the exclusive right to the retail sale of duty-free goods in Greece.
- Duty Free Philippines – founded in 1987, it is a government-owned company that sells taxed and duty-free goods. They operate several shops in the Philippines' major airports, and have a dedicated shopping mall located nearby the country's main airport in Manila, called Duty Free Fiesta Mall.
- King Power – the largest duty-free retailer in Thailand, its duty-free shopping mall in Bangkok's central business district covers over 12,000 m^{2}, and it has branches at Suvarnabhumi Airport and Thailand's other major airports. In 2015, King Power launched an online site selling duty-free and duty-paid items.

== See also ==
- Bonded warehouse
- Free-trade area
- Free-trade zone
  - List of free-trade zones
- Lists of companies
- List of free economic zones
- Tax-free shopping
