= Mohi-Din Binhendi =

Emirati businessman

- Occupation: President
- Employer: Binhendi Enterprises
- Website: https://binhendi.com/about-binhendi/

Mohi-Din Binhendi (Arabic: محيي الدين بن هندي) is an Emirati businessman and president of Binhendi Enterprises.

== Career ==
Binhendi is a former director general of the Department of Civil Aviation of Dubai and former CEO of Dubai International Airport appointed in June 1979 by special decree issued by the then ruler of Dubai Rashid bin Saeed Al Maktoum, having previously served as director of airport customs.

He was a member of the board of governors at Dubai Aviation College, a member of the board of directors at Emirates Golf Club, and chairman of the aviation advisory committee at Dubai Men's College.

He currently serves as president of BinHendi Enterprises. Under Binhendi the company became one of the first UAE-based groups to franchise its own local brands.

== Awards ==
BinHendi was named '1994 Gulf Chief Executive of the Year' by the Gulf Business Awards for his commitment to Dubai International Airport.

Binhendi was awarded the Grand Decoration of Honour in Silver for Services to the Republic of Austria by the President of Austria in January 1995.

In January 1996, Binhendi was awarded the 'Honour of the Order of Merit of the Republic' with the title 'Cavalière' by the President of the Republic of Italy for the promotion and strengthening of cultural and commercial links between Italy and the UAE.
