= Duty-free shop =

Type of retail outlet

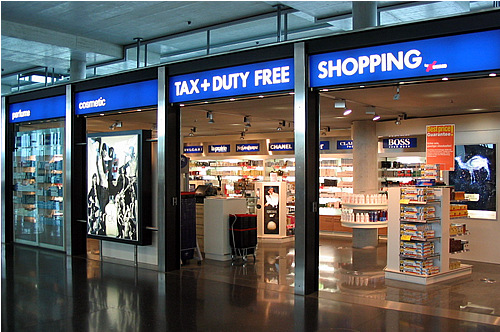
A typical duty-free store, at Zürich Airport

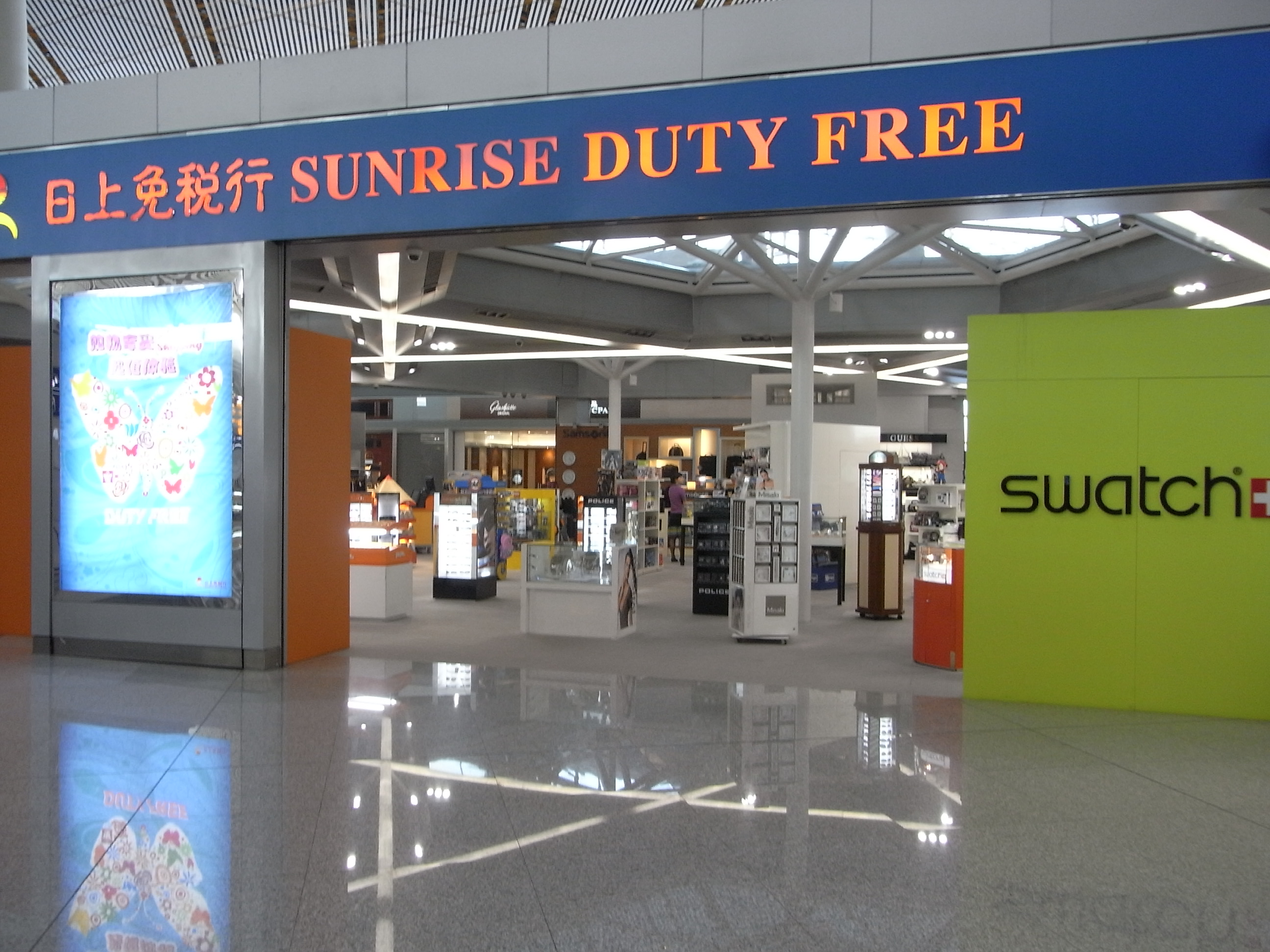
Duty-free store at Terminal 3 of Beijing Capital International Airport

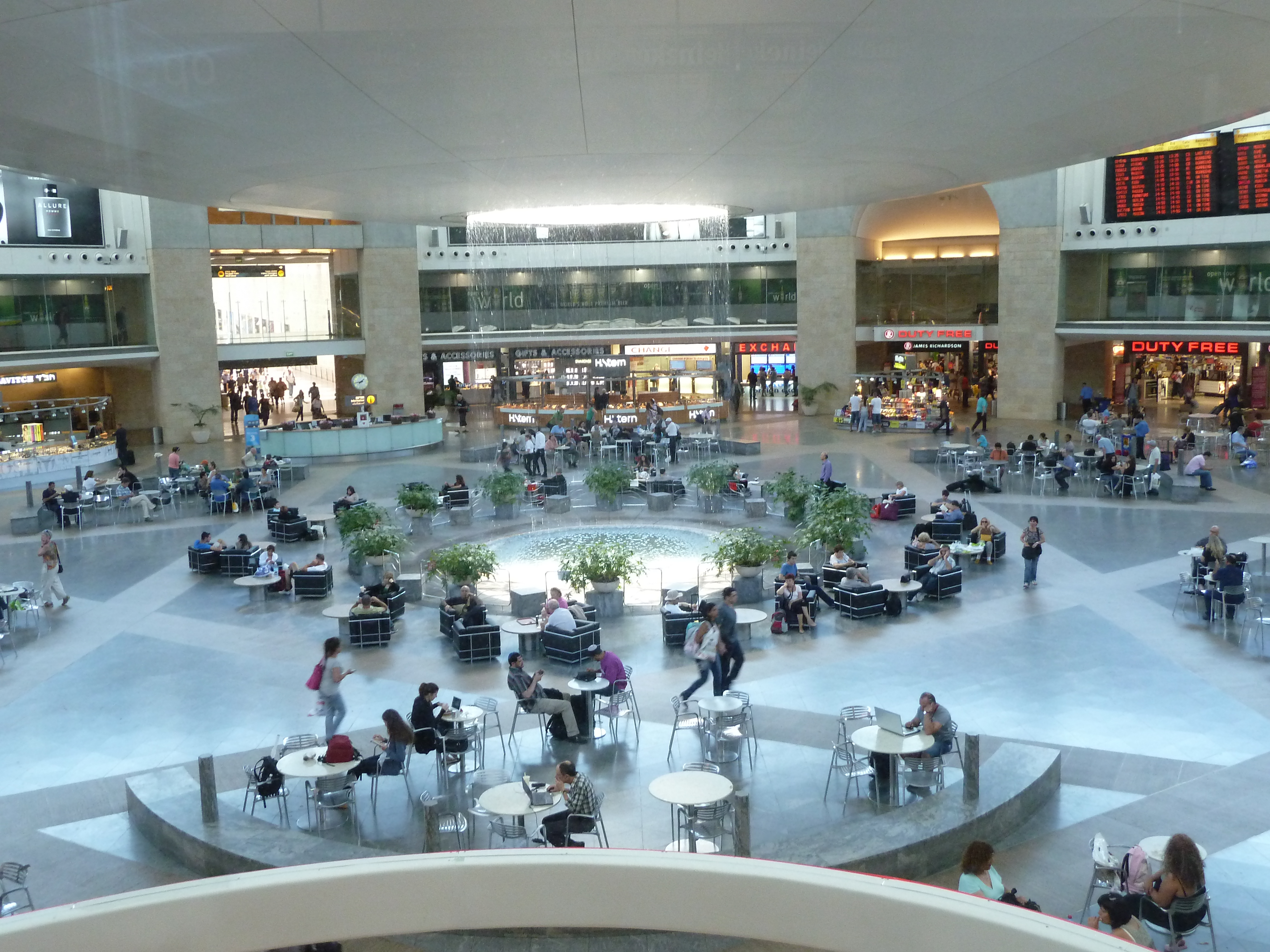
Duty-free stores at Ben Gurion Airport in Tel Aviv, Israel

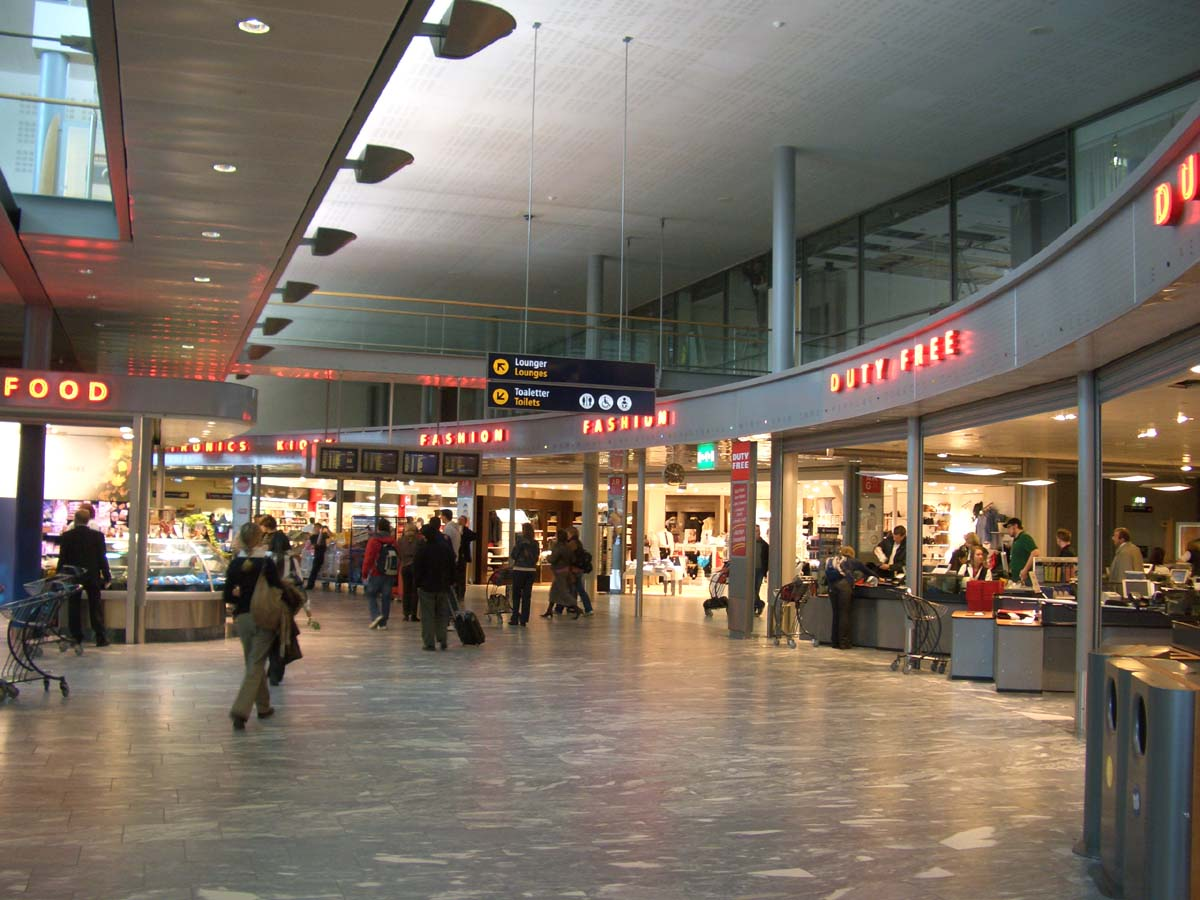
Duty-free stores at Oslo Airport in Oslo, Norway

A duty-free shop or store is a retail outlet whose goods are exempt from the payment of certain local or national taxes and duties, on the requirement that the goods will be sold to travelers who will take them out of the country, who will then pay duties and taxes in their destination country (depending on its personal exemption limits and tariff regime). Which products can be sold duty-free vary by jurisdiction, as well as how they can be sold, and the process of calculating the duty or refunding the duty component.

Tax Free World Association (TFWA) announced that in 2011 the Asia-Pacific region made 35% of global duty-free and travel retail sales, more than either Europe or the Americas, which accounted for 34% and 23% respectively. Fragrances and cosmetics, the largest category of goods, were 31% of all sales, while wines and spirits were 17%.

Some countries impose duties on all goods brought into the country, even if the goods were bought duty-free in another country, or when the value or quantity of such goods exceeds an allowed limit. Duty-free shops are often found in the international zone of international airports, seaports, and train stations but goods can also be bought duty-free on board airplanes and passenger ships. They are not as commonly available for road or train travelers, although several border crossings between the United States and both Canada and Mexico have duty-free shops for car travelers. In some countries, any shop can participate in a reimbursement system, such as Global Blue and Premier Tax Free, wherein a sum equivalent to the tax is paid, but then the goods are presented to customs and the sum reimbursed on exit.

Duty-free are abolished for intra-EU (inside the EU tax union) travelers but are retained for travelers whose final destination is outside the EU. They also sell to intra-EU travelers but with appropriate taxes. The world's largest airport by duty-free sales volume is South Korea's Incheon Airport, with US$1.85 billion in 2016, narrowly overtaking Dubai Duty Free with 2016 sales of $1.82 billion. Haikou International Duty-Free City Shopping Complex is the world's biggest stand-alone duty-free store in terms of physical size. Located in Haikou, Hainan, China, the buildings have a total area of 280,000 square meters.

== History ==
=== 1947–1990: duty free establishment ===
Brendan O'Regan established the world's first duty-free shop at Shannon Airport in Ireland in 1947; it remains in operation today. Designed to provide a service for trans-Atlantic airline passengers typically travelling between Europe and North America whose flights stopped for refuelling on outbound and inbound legs of their journeys, it was an immediate success and has been copied worldwide. Thirteen years later, two American entrepreneurs, Charles Feeney and Robert Warren Miller, founded what is now Duty Free Shoppers (DFS) on 7 November 1960. DFS started operations in Hong Kong and spread to Europe and other places around the globe. Securing the exclusive concession for duty-free sales in Hawaii in the early 1960s was a commercial breakthrough for DFS, which enabled the company to focus on Japanese travelers. DFS continued to innovate, expanding into off-airport duty-free stores and into large downtown Galleria stores; it grew to become the world's largest travel retailer. In 1996, LVMH Moët Hennessy Louis Vuitton acquired the interests of Feeney and two other shareholders and as of 2012 jointly owned DFS with Miller.

In this same period, several locales grew as duty-free shopping destinations. They are exemplified by Saint Martin and the US Virgin Islands in the Caribbean, Hong Kong and Singapore. Still others claim prices competitive to duty-free. Generally, goods are free of duty and tax levied on imports for sale anywhere in the shopping destination. Merchants may pay inventory/business or other taxes, but their customers usually pay none directly.

The mere absence of duty or other taxes on goods being sold does not assure that they are bargains. Costs of identical goods from different duty-free sources can vary widely. They often depend on the presence or absence of nearby competition, e.g., airport stores, especially if all at any airport are owned by a single firm such as Dufry. Also, prices can often be driven upward by the costs of buyer convenience, e.g., in-flight sales by airlines. Many airlines, such as Emirates, El Al, Singapore Airlines, Middle East Airlines, Ukraine International Airlines, Delta, and Avianca, offer duty-free sales on their flights.

=== 1991–2021: EU duty free changes ===
In 1991, the EU decided to keep some duty free for a transition period until 1999.

In 1999, after the creation of the European Union, the single market and the monetary union, these outlets were abolished for intra-EU travellers but are retained for travelers whose final destination is outside the EU. They also sell to intra-EU travelers but with appropriate taxes. Some special member state territories such as Åland, Livigno and the Canary Islands, are within the EU but outside the EU tax union, and thus still continue duty-free sales for all travelers.

In 2021, with Brexit, duty free are reintroduced in three British nations: England, Wales and Scotland. This allows reduced taxes on: wine, Champagne or Prosecco, beer and spirits, as well as on: cigarettes, cigarillos, cigars, or tobacco.

== Duty-free shopping away from ports ==
Some duty-free shops operate in central business districts away from airports or other ports. In Japan, for example, any visitor whose passport indicates that they have been in the country for less than six months can buy items without paying consumption tax, so long as the total purchase value exceeds ¥5,000 and the items will not be consumed in Japan. Duty-free shops are a mainstay in the Akihabara electronic shopping district of Tokyo.

In Thailand, the King Power chain has shops where duty-free items are pre-purchased and delivered separately to the airport to be picked up on departure. For certain other purchases, a VAT refund may be claimed at the airport upon departure.

In the Philippines, there is one shopping mall called the Duty Free Philippines Fiestamall, which is located a few miles away from Ninoy Aquino International Airport as opposed to being at the airport itself. Until the opening of its upscale sister location Luxe in 2018, it was the only shopping mall of its kind in the world. The goods that are sold in this mall are often imported products which come from around the world (mainly from United States, Asia and Australasia) and not found in any other shopping malls in the country, aside from other duty-free malls. Tourists, visitors and returning citizens of the Philippines often pay a visit to this mall shortly after their arrival (since only arriving passengers and their companions are allowed access). In order to gain entry, a passport is needed to be presented and registered at the Customer Registration Counter at the entrance of the mall. The customer will then be issued a shopping card; these shopping cards must be presented to the cashier for validation of purchases. Arriving customers are given a certain tax-free allowance on purchases and anything in excess will be subject to local and national taxes. In the past, the mall had only accepted US dollars and Philippine peso but in recent years, it had begun accepting other currencies, such as the: Japanese yen, Brunei dollar, Australian dollar, British pound, Canadian dollar, Euro, Swiss franc, Saudi riyal, Bahraini dinar, and Thai baht. Currency exchange booths are also available inside the mall if a customer wishes to exchange currencies into Philippine pesos or US dollars. Credits cards can also be used for purchasing goods.

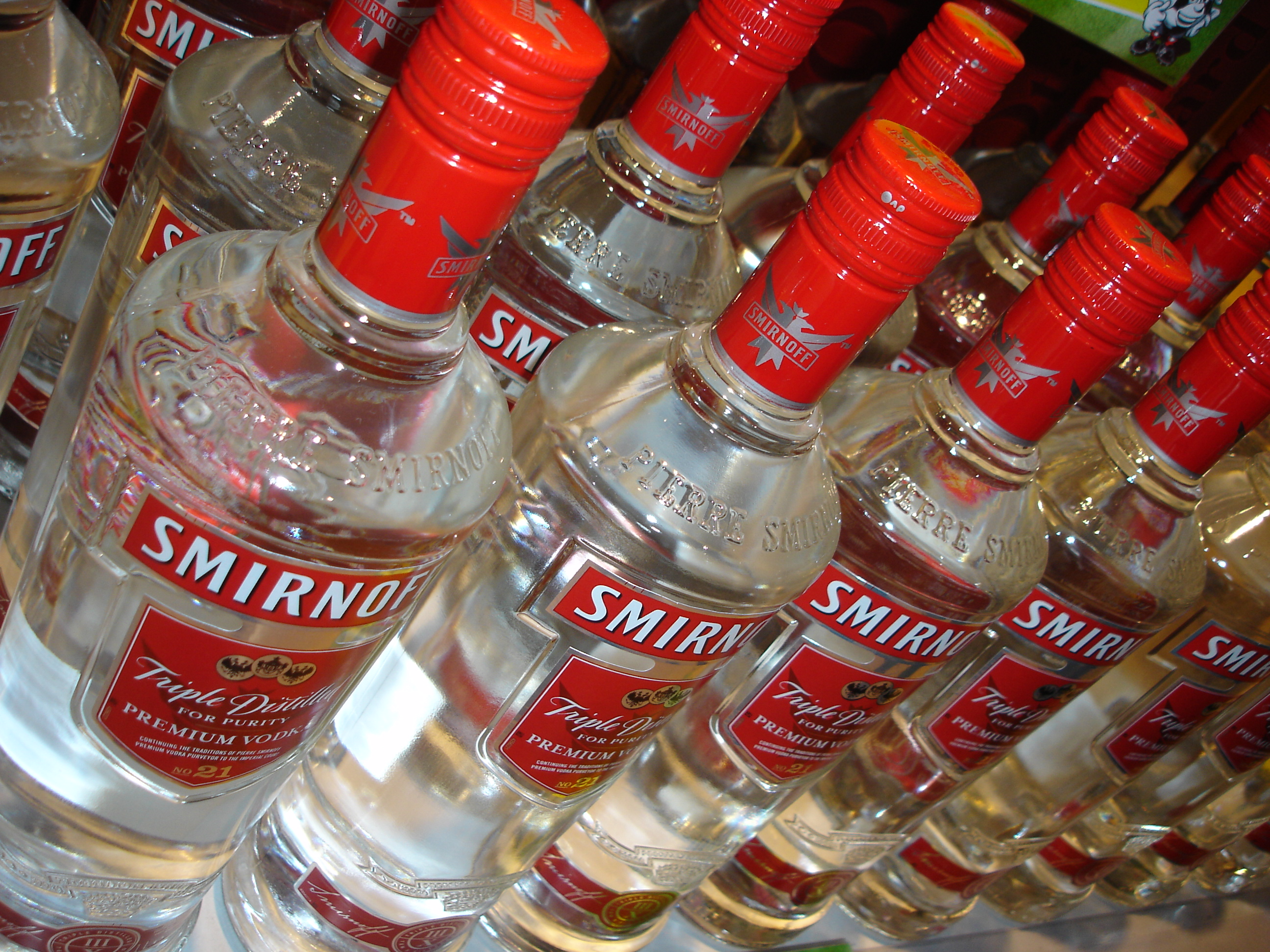
Duty-free shops usually sell a broad range of alcoholic drinks.

In Australia, duty-free shops, once common, have practically disappeared since the introduction of GST in 2000. Retailer James Richardson operates several duty-free shops in major cities, but most duty-free shops are now located within international airports. Residents and tourists are allowed to purchase virtually any physical good within 60 days of departure, which needs to be taken on the outward flight, and claim the GST component back through the Tourist Refund Scheme when passing through customs. Consumers are now free to fully use their items prior to departure. This is in contrast prior to 2000, where all purchases had to be packed by the duty-free store in a sealed clear plastic bag, and could only be broken open by customs staff just prior to departure.

=== Duty-free outside EU ports ===
Any traveller living in a country outside the EU VAT area is entitled to shop tax-free at participating shops in the EU. Tax free shopping differs from duty-free shopping as the traveller pays the VAT on goods in the shop in the usual way, and can then request a refund when exporting the goods. There are a number of tax-free operators who can support both the stores and the traveler through this process. To qualify, the traveller must:

- have residency in a non-EU country
- have a maximum stay of six months within the EU
- make purchases no more than three months prior to export
- obtain a form from the shop where he or she makes the purchase (depending on the tax-free operator)
- present the form, and in certain cases the goods, to a customs officer or DIVA machine when leaving the EU, where they will be stamped

Only goods meant for personal use are eligible for the refund. The stamped forms and receipts can then be sent back to the retailers or their agents for a refund.

In most cases, a minimum purchase applies to use the tax-free shopping scheme. The actual amount of VAT reclaimable depends on the VAT rate applicable in the particular country to the goods purchased, and may be subject to a deduction for administration fees.

== Security considerations ==
Travelers on long-haul routes with at least one transit stop between their departure airport and destination airport should be careful to purchase their duty-free alcohol or perfume at the last transit port, as otherwise they may have it confiscated by security when they board at the transit port, as they will be exceeding the current limit on liquids in hand baggage. This does not apply to passengers transferring within the EU and Singapore on the same day, as long as the liquid item is sealed in a plastic security bag that shows the receipt. Arrivals duty-free shops are now becoming more common. Most of South and Central America, and the Caribbean have such shops, as does South East Asia and Oceania. Switzerland and Canada were looking to introduce them in 2010. This method of retail removes any security problems with the transit of liquids, as they are not carried on aircraft.

Several airlines do not allow sales of certain sharp objects in-flight due to security risk. Other objects that have sharp parts, such as model airplanes, may be bought in-flight but received at the passengers' home address for the same reason.

=== Boarding Pass / Passports ===
Proof of travel may be requested at the checkout point to prevent airport employees from making personal purchases.

== Inbound duty-free ==
Some countries or districts: Argentina, Australia, Brazil, Chile, China, Colombia, Iceland, Italy, Iran, India, Jamaica, Kenya, Lebanon, Malaysia, New Zealand, Norway, Panama, the Philippines, Sri Lanka, Switzerland, Taiwan, Turkey, the United Arab Emirates and Uzbekistan have inwards duty-free facilities, where arriving passengers can purchase duty-free items immediately before going through customs. This not only saves the inconvenience of having to carry these items around the world but also solves the security problem mentioned above. Other countries such as Canada and Sweden have been considering duty-free on arrival.

The European Union does not permit arrivals duty-free stores; some EU airports sell goods on arrival in the baggage claim area described as "Tax-Free", but these goods are all tax-paid sales, the local sales tax is discounted. Normally, discounted liquors or tobacco products cannot be bought when arriving into an EU Member State as there is often a high local Excise Duty on these goods as well as the local sales tax (VAT/IVA/TVA) which is included in the price. In some EU Territories the tax on tobaccos and liquors is lower than in other EU countries, which is why the prices still seem competitive and look like duty-free prices.

== Legal basis ==
It is a common feature of most tax systems that taxes are not raised on goods to be exported. To do so could place the goods at a disadvantage to those from other countries, for example if the tax rate in the territory of sale is higher than the tax rate in the territory of consumption. Either the tax system allows the goods to be exported without taxes (stored prior to export in a bonded warehouse), or taxes can be claimed back when they are exported.

Such exemption also applies to goods supplied for use on ships and aircraft, because they are consumed outside the country. Businesses supplying such goods can do so tax- and duty-free.

Goods sold to passengers on board ships or aircraft are tax free. The passenger can either consume them on board, or import them tax-free into the country they are traveling to, so long as they are within the traveler's duty-free allowance. Most tax regimes also allow travelers entering a country to bring in a certain amount of goods for personal use without paying tax on them, the so-called "duty-free allowance"; because it is not economically justifiable to collect the small amounts of tax involved, and would be an inconvenience to the passengers.

A duty-free shop works under the same system. The goods must be exported intact (they cannot be consumed in the country of sale), and they are importing into the destination country under that country's own tax rules. In some countries, in order to ensure that goods are exported intact, they are hand-delivered in a closed bag to the passenger at the gate after their ticket is scanned. In the United States, duty-free shops are technically considered class 9 Bonded Warehouses with regard to the U.S. Customs & Border Protection:

- Class 9. Bonded warehouse, known as duty-free stores, used for selling, for use outside the Customs territory, conditionally duty-free merchandise owned or sold by the proprietor and delivered from the Class 9 warehouse to an airport or other exit point for exportation by, or on behalf of, individuals departing from the Customs territory for destinations other than foreign trade zones. Pursuant to 19 U.S.C. 1555(b)(8)(C), Customs territory, for purposes of duty-free stores, means the Customs territory of the U.S. as defined in 101.1(e) of this chapter, and foreign trade zones (see part 146 of this chapter). All distribution warehouses used exclusively to provide individual duty-free sales locations and storage cribs with conditionally duty-free merchandise are also Class 9 warehouses.

Moreover, in the U.S. some duty-free stores will sell their goods to domestic passengers with appropriate taxes included. Alcohol and tobacco products are restricted to international passengers only and subject to the age limitations of 18 and 21 respectively, even though the age one must be to import those items into other countries may be lower.

=== Visiting U.S. protectorates ===
U.S. citizens receive substantially higher duty exemptions than normal when they visit or transit these locales, e.g., Guam, U.S. Virgin Islands.

== Competition ==
According to Autogrill / World Duty Free case, duty free is a market where competition is kept both in the EEA market and in the global market. Even with the 2008 merger of the two biggest duty free operators, Autogrill and World Duty Free, they together own less than 10% of the global market and less than 20% of the EEA market.

== See also ==
- Fuel tax, jet fuel used in international flights is sold wholesale
- List of duty-free shops
