= Avolta =

Swiss travel retailer

Avolta AG
- Formerly: Weitnauer (1865–2003); Dufry (2003–2023)
- Type: Public
- Traded as: SIX: AVOL
- Industry: Travel retail
- Founded: 1865; 161 years ago
- Headquarters: Basel, Switzerland
- Area served: Worldwide
- Key people: Juan Carlos Torres Carretero (board chair); Xavier Rossinyol (CEO)
- Products: Consumer Goods
- Subsidiaries: Host, Hudson, World Duty Free, Nuance, Hellenic Duty Free Shops, RegStaer, Duty Free Uruguay, Duty Free Argentina, Colombian Emeralds
- Website: avoltaworld.com

Avolta AG (until November 2023: Dufry AG) is a Swiss-based travel retailer that operates duty-free and duty-paid (specialty retail) shops and convenience stores in airports, cruise lines, seaports, railway stations, and central tourist areas. The company, headquartered in Basel, employs almost 75,000 people and operates in over 75 countries worldwide. It is publicly traded on the SIX Swiss Exchange.

== Retail brands ==
The company's retail brands are:

- Hudson
- World Duty Free
- Autogrill (primarily a food service operator)
  - Host
- Nuance Group
- Hellenic Duty Free Shops
- RegStaer
- Colombian Emeralds
- Duty Free Uruguay
- Duty Free Shop Argentina

In addition, Dufry is also used as a brand name for some general travel retail shops.

== History ==
The company owns stores at airports, railway stations and ports, and operates concessions onboard airlines and cruise ships.

By August 2017, the Chinese HNA Group, which declared bankruptcy in 2021, had acquired a 20.92% stake in Avolta, worth more than $1 billion. According to the Dutch OSINT platform Datenna, HNA Groups's stake in Avolta led to a medium risk of state influence on Avolta by the Chinese government. HNA Group's airport division was acquired by Hainan Development Holdings on 24 December 2021. However, HNA reduced their share to 3% in 2019.

On 24 October 2023, Dufry announced it was entering a strategic partnership with Hubei Airport Group, a Chinese based air transportation support company. The deal allows Dufry to operate as the Terminal 2 master concessionaire overseeing 77 shops at Wuhan Tianhe International Airport, China’s fourteenth busiest airport.

Dufry's name was changed to Avolta AG on 3 November 2023, after a 99.8% approval by shareholders during an Extraordinary General Meeting convened following the fusion with Autogrill. Through its investment vehicle, Edizione Holding S.p.A., the Benetton family is the largest shareholder of Avolta, holding 22.17% of outstanding shares.

=== Milestones ===
- 2025: Management of fifteen duty-free stores across five airports in Tunisia
- 2023: Name changed to Avolta AG after the fusion with the Italian restaurant chain Autogrill (including worldwide food service operator Host).
- 2020: Hudson becomes a wholly owned subsidiary of Dufry and is delisted from the NYSE.
- 2019: Dufry acquires a 60% stake of RegStaer Vnukovo.
- 2018: Dufry's subsidiary Hudson Ltd. listed on the New York Stock Exchange (NYSE) with its first trading day on February 1, 2018
- 2016: Renewal of existing concession contracts. The company is included in the Swiss Leader Index, compiled of the 30 largest Swiss Corporations listed on the SIX Swiss Exchange.
- 2015: Acquisition of World Duty Free
- 2014: Acquisition of The Nuance Group
- 2012: Acquisition of 51% of joint venture with RegStaer Group in Russia. Acquisition of 51% of travel retail operations of Folli Follie Group in Greece
- 2011: Acquisitions of retail companies within Argentina, Uruguay, Ecuador, Martinique, and Armenia, involving 21 duty-free shops split between ten airports
- 2010: Merger of Dufry Ltd. with Dufry South America Ltd.
- 2008: Acquisition of US based travel retailer Hudson Group with 550 shops in 69 airports and transportation terminals in the United States and Canada.
- 2007: Acquisition of one of the main travel retail operators in the Caribbean based in Puerto Rico with 23 shops in Puerto Rico and other Caribbean locations.
- 2006: Initial Public Offering of Dufry South America Ltd. (DSA) in December. Trading of the shares on the Brazilian and Luxembourg stock exchanges. Acquisition of the Brazilian travel retailer Brasif and its logistic platform Eurotrade.
- 2005: Dufry becomes a publicly listed company – its shares being listed on SIX Swiss Exchange. Acquisition of the remaining 25% share capital from previous shareholders by a consortium led by Advent International Corporation. Change of logo / corporate design.
- 2004: Consortium led by Advent International Corporation acquires 75% of outstanding share capital of Dufry. Focusing of strategy on travel retail – divestment of wholesale and non-strategic activities as Weitnauer Distribution (February).
- 2003: Name changes to Dufry.
- 1952: Start of duty-free retail business – opening of the first duty-free shop in continental Europe in Paris/Le Bourget.
- 1948: Start of duty-free wholesale business.
- 1865: Company founded as a retailer in Switzerland under the name of Weitnauer.

== Location ==
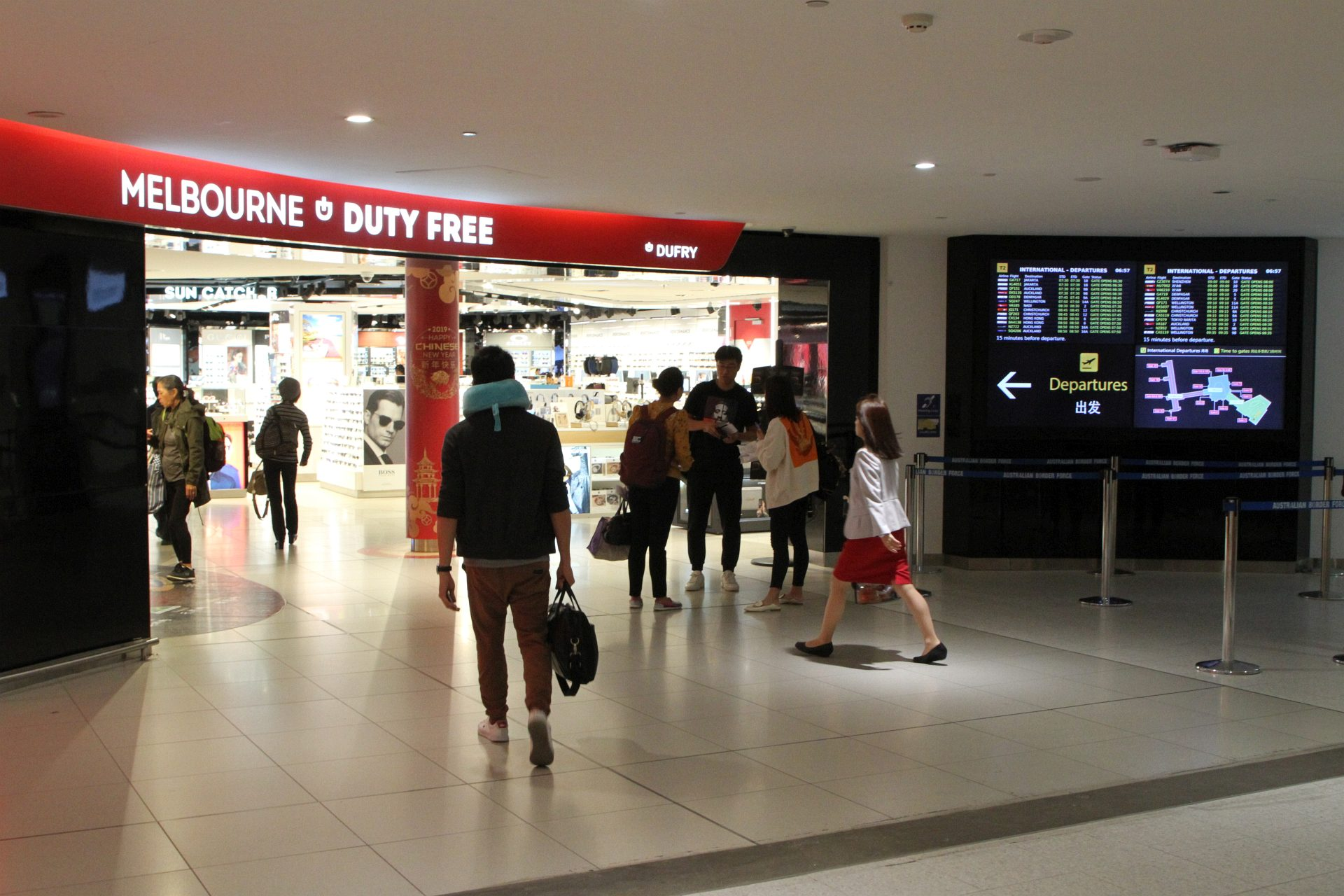
Dufry operated duty free store at Melbourne Airport

Some of the principal locations of the company are:

- Tunis Carthage Airport, Tunis (Tunisia)
- Zurich Airport, Kloten (Switzerland)
- EuroAirport Basel Mulhouse Freiburg, Basel (Switzerland)
- Sabiha Gökçen International Airport, Istanbul (Turkey)
- Zvartnots International Airport, Yerevan (Armenia)
- Shirak International Airport, Gyumri (Armenia)
- Vancouver International Airport, Vancouver (Canada)
- Las Americas International Airport, Santo Domingo (Dominican Republic)
- Melbourne Airport, Melbourne (Australia)
- Ministro Pistarini International Airport, Buenos Aires (Argentina)
- Guarulhos International Airport, São Paulo (Brazil)
- Kempegowda International Airport, Bangalore (India)
- Mexico City International Airport, Mexico City (Mexico)
- Malpensa International Airport (Italy)
- All of Milan's railway stations (Italy)
- Jorge Chávez International Airport, Lima (Peru)
- Sharjah International Airport (United Arab Emirates)
- Mohammed V International Airport, Casablanca (Morocco)
- Sheremetyevo International Airport, Moscow (Russia)
- El Dorado Airport, Bogotá (Colombia)
- Siem Reap International Airport (Cambodia)
- Phnom Penh International Airport (Cambodia)
- Hong Kong West Kowloon railway station (Hong Kong)
- P&O Ferries (United Kingdom)
- Wuhan Tianhe International Airport (China)
- Shanghai Pudong International Airport (China)

== See also ==
- List of duty-free shops
