= Yawarqucha (Huánuco) =

Lake in Peru

- Laguna Yahuarcocha
- Location within Peru Location within South America
- Interactive map of Yawarqucha
- Location: Peru; Huánuco Region
- Coordinates: 12°09′05″S 75°34′50″W

Yawarqucha (Quechua yawar blood qucha lake, "blood lake", hispanicized spelling Yahuarcocha) is a lake in Peru located in the Huánuco Region, Huacaybamba Province, Huacaybamba District. Yawarqucha lies southeast of the larger lake Mamaqucha of the Pinra District.
