= Huacrachuco =

Huacrachuco Waqra-chuku
- Town
- Location within Peru
- Coordinates: 8°36′15″S 77°09′00″W
- Country: Peru
- Region: Huánuco
- Province: Marañón
- District: Huacrachuco

Government
  - Mayor: Aliardo Aguirre Limas
- Elevation: 3,955 m (12,976 ft)

Population (2017)
  - Total: 4,148
- Time zone: UTC-5 (PET)
- Postal code: 10881
- Website: www.munimaranon.gob.pe

Huacrachuco (Waqra-chuko) is a town in central Peru, capital of Marañón Province in Huánuco Region.

== Toponymy ==
The word "huacrachuco" would be made up of two words, waqra, meaning 'horn' or 'antler', and chuku which is either from Quechua language meaning 'headdress' or from Kulyi language and/or Seeptsá language meaning 'country' or 'land'.

The colonial author Inca Garcilaso in the first chapter of his eighth book treats with all luxury of details the town of the Huacrachucos, name to which he attributes a Quechua etymology with proper motivation. According to the Inca, the people of Huacrachuco would have had the custom of carrying a deer antler (waqra or wagra) in the headdress (chuko or chuku). Although Huacrachuco is currently in a Quechua-speaking area, it is necessary to take into account its close proximity to the region that was formerly the Kulyi-speaking region. The Kulyi toponymy is characterized by a high frequency of terminations in -chuco or -chugo, an element that in Kulyi meant 'earth', 'country', or 'land' (and not 'hat', as in Quechua).

== History ==
Regarding the name of the district, the historian José Vara Llanos in his work "Historia de Huánuco" (1959:53) mentions: "formed of guacra or guagra: horn, and chuku: hat... was the distinctive garment used by the primitive inhabitants of that area that constituted the nation of the Wacrachucus.

Approximately 10,000 years ago B.C., the first men to populate the ancient space of Huacrachuco left traces of their cultural manifestations through cave pictographs. Proof of this is the cave of Ucarragra and on the margins of Ushuraj Lagoon. From the 11th century to the 16th century A.D., the Wacrachucos nation was gradually forged, which was later added to the Inca Empire under the government of Inca Tupac Yupanqui (1471 - 1493).

José Varallanos (1959:72-73) states: "The nation of the Wacrachucos or the Andes of Marañón occupied lands on the eastern side of the Marañón River, from north Singa up to the current province of Huamachuco. On an abrupt topography, it belonged to a numerous and warrior tribe that wore as a distinctive cap that ended in a deer horn.

They were governed by kurakas called campis, who were the ones who dealt with the victorious Incas, as Garcilaso affirms; ovas being the name given to the common people. They worshipped their ancestors and built their dwellings in secure locations and carved monoliths of stone, to which, like their divinities, they erected small and mysterious temples.

According to the opinion of General Louis Langlois, the Wacrachucos, on the Marañón route, would have given way to the Chachapuyas (Chachapoyas), of Amazonian influence, in the migrations towards the cordillera. The archaeologist Julio C. Tello, convinced in his studies, affirms that the region of the Wacrachucos originally was of the Chavin culture; since this one expanded throughout the Marañón basin; especially in the mountain range contiguous to the forest, where Chavin remains are found in their classic forms and in all the richness of their varied stylizations.

The lithic sculptures, artifacts and others that enclose the tombs of this geographical area, such as those of Tinyash, clearly demonstrate the local evolution after the dissolution the Chavín culture. The land of Huacrachuco was the melting pot of old civilizations that also flourished in other areas of the upper and middle basin of the Marañón River, particularly the Wanukos, Wacrachucos and Chachapuyas nations, which bordered them to the South, North and Northeast, respectively.

A large number of buildings exist in the area of the current province of Marañón. Especially in the vicinity of the towns of Huacrachuco, Huacaybamba and Pinra, inhabited until the sixteenth century by the Antas, Paucaricras, Callanas, etc., warlike tribes that constituted the nation of the Huacrachucos. In Tinyash it can be seen buildings that attract the attention of researchers. Moreover, concerning almost all those of the zone of the Upper Marañón, the Spanish chroniclers do not give information, nor is mentioned in any document.

Garcilaso de la Vega in his work "The Royal Comments of the Incas" (1973:78-79) explains: "It was necessary for the Inca to first conquer that province Huacrachucu in order to pass to the Chachapuya; and thus he (Tupac Yupanqui) ordered his army to be straightened out. The natives defended themselves, daring in the harsh struggle of their land and even confident of victory, because it seemed impregnable. With this confidence they went out to defend the steps, where there were great encounters and many deaths on both sides. As seen by the Inca Tupac Yupanqui and his Council, it seemed to them that if the war was carried by fire and blood, it would be with much damage to theirs and total destruction of enemies.

Therefore, having gained some strong steps Tupac Yupanqui sent emissaries to request peace and friendship, Incas informed that they would not take away any land or possessions from Wacrachucos, but rather they would enrich them with new irrigation ditches and other benefits; and, although there were many who seemed to recognize the Inca as lord, not all agreed, because the young people, being less experienced and more numerous, contradicted the curacas and seniors, went out with their fervor and pursued war with much fury, it seemed to them that they were obliged to win or die all, because they had contradicted the elders.

Tupac Yupanqui, in order to make Wacrachucos foes see that having invited them for peace had not been for weakness of courage nor lack of strength, but for compassion and kindness, ordered the war to be truly strengthened and to attack Wacrachucos in many areas, distributing the army in thirds so that they exhausted Wacrachuco strength and spirit. With the second offensive that the Incas made, they gained other locations and took strong steps, they constrained the Wacrachucos so that it was convenient for them to ask for mercy.

The Inca Tupac Yupanqui did not want to go ahead in his "conquest of the known world", because it seemed to him that he had had enough in that summer in having conquered a province like that one, so rough to siege and so bellicose of people; and also because that land is very rainy, he ordered to lodge his army in the border of the region. He also commanded that twenty thousand more men be prepared for the following summer, because he did not intend to delay his following conquests as much as last summer. He ordered the Wacrachuco curacas to be given a lot of clothing of fine type, which they call campi, and to the common people that called awaska. He commanded to provide Wacrachuco with a lot of food, because with the war they had wasted what they had for their year, so they were very happy the newly conquered and lost the fear of punishment for their rebellion. He commanded the newly acquired province to be given trace and order, to develop irrigation channels, and to make terraces, leveling hills and slopes that could be sown, all of which was recognized by Wacrachuco indians in great benefit to them.

== Geography ==
Located on the left bank of the Huacrachuco River in an inter-Andean valley excavated by this river in the middle of the central chain, at an altitude of 2920 masl and at coordinates 8°36′23.35″S 77°08′53.69″O.

=== Hydrography ===
It is located in the Marañón River basin, as the river of the same name is one of its tributaries.

In 2009 a lagoon was formed in its upper part, as a result of the slide of the Chunchuymá hill towards the Manzarán hill.

=== Climate ===
Average climatological parameters of Huacrachuco
Month	Jan.	Feb.	Mar.	Apr.	May.	Jun.	Jul.	Aug.	Sep.	Oct.	Nov.	Dec.	Annual
Avg. max. temperature (°C)	25	26	26	25	23.5	22	21	21	21	22	23	24	23.3
Avg. min. temperature (°C)	18.5	19	20	18	17	16	15	14.5	14.5	15	16	17	16.7
Total precipitation (mm)	0	3	36	0	0	0	0	0	119	198	431	0	787
Source: accuweather.com

== Highlights ==
With the construction of the "penetration road" from Chimbote to Uchiza, the town of Huacrachuco has become a major centre of interregional trade due to its numerous annexes and nearby settlements. Some local highlights include:

- Cerro de Acotambo - Comes from the runashumi (the local quechua variety) "aqu" = sand and "tambo" = accommodation. It is a radiant snowy, fecund in mineral resources and that serves as a natural viewpoint, having the in front of the Cerro Tintero. It is considered as the jealous guardian of the province of Marañón. There are architectural evidences of pre-Inca houses.
- Ucurragra Caves - Derives from the runashumi "ucush" = mouse and "rraqra" = ravine. Located to 8 km. of the Villa of Huacrachuco. It is a complex of caverns, whose depth keeps mysteries and numerous legends; in its interior can be appreciated deposits of cave paintings that date from the origins of Wacrachuco culture. There are also capricious figures that seem that nature has given them life, such as: the three-dimensional head, horse, enchanted bells, figures of pig, goat, cat, puma, bull, the maiden mancornada, the three gallows, raca rumi and what the fantasy can imagine.
- Lagoon of Asiaj - Located near the annex of Chonas, 5 minutes walk from the road to the district of Cholón. Beautiful lagoon of crystalline waters, paradisiac place of easy access, where is joined the mountain range with the eyebrow of jungle, its shores covered with totoras and more around covered with local trees, offers to its visitors an ideal place to spend a weekend or an unforgettable stroll.
- Chinchaycocha Lagoon - Derives from the runashumi "chinchay" = ocelot and "cocha" = lagoon. Located 1.30 hours from the town center of Chocobamba. It is a beautiful water reserve of 1800 meters of length, here the visitors and inhabitants of the zone can practice the sport fishing of trouts and the hunting of wild ducks.
- Ushuraj Lagoon (also known as Ushura-cocha) - Located near the village of Huacrachuco. Picturesque lagoon of crystalline waters, it is characterized by a diversity of flora and wild fauna; in its surroundings diverse petroglyphs have been found.
- Three Lagoons (Tres lagunas) - Located in the heights of Huacrachuco. Place where you can appreciate a graceful panoramic view of translucent waters that are intertwined through streams.
- Maquimpirga Archaeological Site - Located between the towns of Ishpinco and Maracay, 8 km. from the village of Huacrachuco; the vestiges of a little preserved site.
- Archaeological Site of Marco - Located 3 km. from the village of Huacrachuco, where lies part of a pre-Inca citadel, built of stone and mud. It is considered as an observatory of surveillance of the Huacrachucos.
- Archaeological Site of Pueblo Viejo - Located 10 km. from the village of Huacrachuco. It is a pre-Inca citadel, considered as the original seat of the ancient culture of the Huacrachucos. According to Donato Amador Híjar Soto: "As one who looks towards the jungle in the middle of the eastern mountain range, the remains of an ancient pre-Inca city are raised and that the locals know by the name of Pueblo Viejo, the ancient Wacrachuco whose people wore hats with antlers of deer and tarukas and who were ferocious warriors. As this marka served as a link between the sierra and part of the Uchiza jungle, it was like a great deposit, a pantry, where they accumulated large amounts of treasure as well as food, and with that wealth they built a fortress in that high mountain". To enter this fortress you must first go through the center of a lagoon, then reach a road, continue along it, pass an underground river and reach the fortified city. It is mysterious and makes one think how the pre-Inca chiefs could have accumulated their treasure in this fortress, which is certainly difficult to reach.
- The Urhuarrumi - A singular and legendary rocky massif, considered as natural wonder since it is seen from different neighboring provinces. Several legends and historical testimonies are told about the place among the inhabitants of Marañón valley. It is a rock of great height that rises to the sky, with the appearance of a human being with a bulging stomach that the legend identifies as one of the giants petrified by the evil Tallikuna; but one day it will recover its human figure to avenge and sentence the evil in the snowy Acotambo and be buried forever in the Antarpo Marchino, which comes to be a mouth of the earth without end.
- Huacrachuco River - It is an important tributary torrent of the Marañón, it is born in the charming lagoon of Chinchaycocha, and in its course it receives the affluence of the rivers: Chocobamba, Choquehuanca, Saltana, Huagas and Anchic. Along the way, it configures uniform valleys; besides, it is possible to practice artisan trout fishing.
- Cerros Tres Tullpas - Located in the bordering lands of the Huánuco, La Libertad and Áncash regions. According to the version of the scholar Merarí Salazar these are the three mute and immortal witnesses, in whose presence signed a temporary peace act the giants thirsty for revenge.
- Others: The archaeological sites of: Awilo marks, in GochIchilca; Shampumay located between the hamlets of Quillabamba and Huanchay; Uchumarco and Estrella, in Marcopata; Torre gollga and Auquinmarca, in Papajirca; also: Chunupún, Corralones, Gonpish, Guenguish, Quishuar and Ushnu Colorado. The beautiful landscapes of Callanas or Pacallanas, Mollepampa, Paucaricras and Huariganchas; the beautiful panoramas of Huaychao and Huamboe; the crystalline creek of Chocobamba; the narrow deep valley of Tingo Grande; the plaza de armas of Huacrachuco, the Jefecito (erect penis) located in the annex of Progreso. The caves of Afilanga and Portichuelo; the Human Forest in Chucaromonte; the solitary Gallo Rumi; the Cave of Shanshamarca better known as Pueblo de Brujos; the Condor Rumi in Ucurragra; the Thermal Waters of Racarragra located in the ravine of Ñawinpun, between the annexes of Asay and Vinchos; the Condor Gaga, rocks located in the community of Sinay, among others.

== Festivities ==
- August 30: The main festivity is the celebration of Santa Rosa de Lima, Patron Saint of Huacrachuco.
- 21 October: Anniversary of the Marañón Province.
- 8 December: Virgen Purísima of the Yamos annex.

== Education ==
Through an alliance with the University Hermilio Valdizán of Huánuco, it was created a sub headquarter of the Faculty of Agronomy.
