= Cholon =

Cholon may refer to:

- Chợ Lớn, or Cholon, an unofficial quarter of Ho Chi Minh City, Vietnam
- Chợ Lớn (ward), a ward of Ho Chi Minh City within the Chợ Lớn quarter
- Chợ Lớn province, a former province of South Vietnam
- Cholón District, a district of Marañón, Peru
- Cholón language, also known as Seeptsá and Tsinganeses, a recently extinct language of Peru
