= Yawarqucha =

Yawarqucha (Quechua for "blood lake", also spelled Yaguarccocha, Yaguarcocha, Yahuarccocha, Yahuarcocha, Yawarcocha, Yahuarjocha) or Yawarkucha (Kichwa for "blood lake") may refer to:

== Lakes ==
- Yawarkucha, a lake in the Imbabura Province, Ecuador
- Yawarqucha (Cajamarca), a lake in the Cajamarca Region, Peru
- Yawarqucha (Huánuco), a lake in the Huánuco Region, Peru

== Mountain ==
- Yawarqucha (Huancavelica), a mountain on the border of the provinces of Castrovirreyna, Huancavelica and Huaytará in the Huancavelica Region, Peru
- Yawarqucha (Huaytará), a mountain in the Huaytará Province, Huancavelica Region, Peru
- Yawarqucha (Junín), a mountain in the Junín Region, Peru
- Yawarqucha (Lima), a mountain at a small lake of that name in the Lima Region, Peru
