= Hatun Hirka =

Hatun Hirka (Quechua: hatun big, hirka mountain, "big mountain", also spelled Atun Irca, Jatun Jirca, Jatunjirca) may refer to:

- Hatun Hirka (Huaylas-Santa), a mountain on the border of the provinces of Huaylas and Santa, Ancash Region, Peru
- Hatun Hirka (Huacaybamba), a mountain in the Huacaybamba Province, Huánuco Region, Peru
- Hatun Hirka (Huari), a mountain in the Huari Province, Ancash Region, Peru
- Hatun Hirka (Huánuco), a mountain in the Huánuco Region, Peru
