= Nachappa Gopalsami =

American electrical engineer

Nachappa Gopalsami is an electrical engineer at the Argonne National Laboratory in Lemont, Illinois. He was named a Fellow of the Institute of Electrical and Electronics Engineers (IEEE) in 2015 for his contributions to millimeter-wave spectroscopy, imaging, and reflectometry.
