= Dark skin =

Human skin color

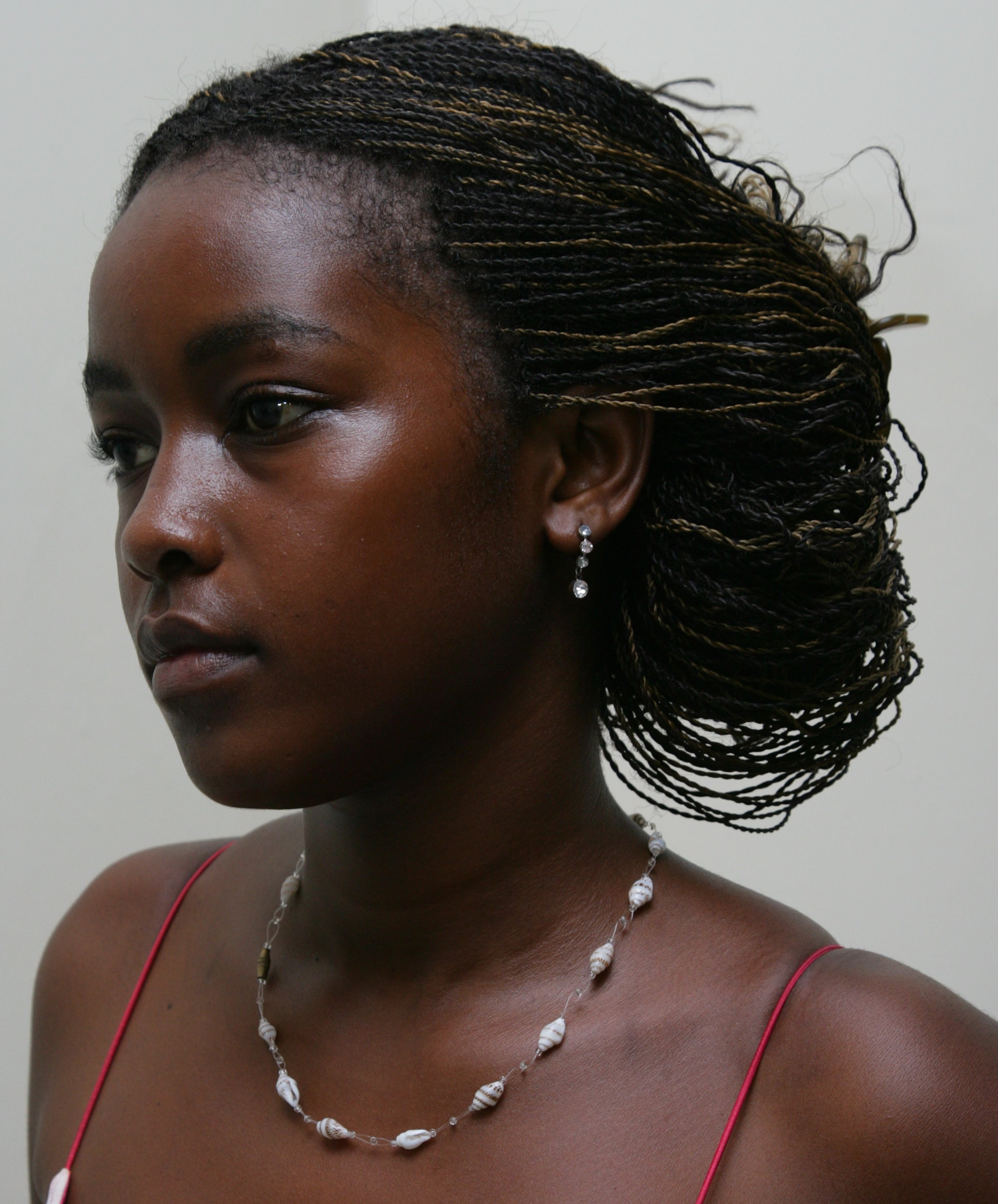
A woman with dark skin

Dark skin is a type of human skin color that is rich in melanin pigments. People with dark skin are often referred to as black people, although this usage can be ambiguous in some countries where it is also used to specifically refer to different ethnic groups or populations.

The evolution of dark skin is believed to have begun around 1.2 million years ago, in light-skinned early hominid species after they moved from the equatorial rainforest to the sunny savannas. In the heat of the savannas, better cooling mechanisms were required, which were achieved through the loss of body hair and development of more efficient perspiration. The loss of body hair led to the development of dark skin pigmentation, which acted as a mechanism of natural selection against folate (vitamin B9) depletion, and to a lesser extent, DNA damage. The primary factor contributing to the evolution of dark skin pigmentation was the breakdown of folate in reaction to ultraviolet radiation; the relationship between folate breakdown induced by ultraviolet radiation and reduced fitness as a failure of normal embryogenesis and spermatogenesis led to the selection of dark skin pigmentation. By the time modern Homo sapiens evolved, all humans were dark-skinned.

Humans with dark skin pigmentation have skin naturally rich in melanin, especially eumelanin, and have more melanosomes which provide superior protection against the deleterious effects of ultraviolet radiation. This helps the body to retain its folate reserves and protects against damage to DNA.

Dark-skinned people who live in high latitudes with mild sunlight are at an increased risk—especially in the winter—of vitamin D deficiency. As a consequence of vitamin D deficiency, they are at a higher risk of developing rickets, numerous types of cancers, and possibly cardiovascular disease and low immune system activity. However, some recent studies have questioned if the thresholds indicating vitamin D deficiency in light-skinned individuals are relevant for dark-skinned individuals, as they found that, on average, dark-skinned individuals have higher bone density and lower risk of fractures than lighter-skinned individuals with the same levels of vitamin D. This is possibly attributed to lower presence of vitamin D binding agents (and thus its higher bioavailability) in dark-skinned individuals.

The global distribution of generally dark-skinned populations is strongly correlated with the high ultraviolet radiation levels of the regions inhabited by them. These populations, with the exception of indigenous Tasmanians, almost exclusively live near the equator, in tropical areas with intense sunlight: Africa, Australia, Melanesia, South Asia, Southeast Asia, West Asia, and the Americas. Studies into non-African populations indicates dark skin is not necessarily a retention of the pre-existing high UVR-adapted state of modern humans before the out of Africa migration, but may in fact be a later evolutionary adaptation to tropical rainforest regions. Due to mass migration and increased mobility of people between geographical regions in the recent past, dark-skinned populations today are found all over the world.

== Evolution ==
Due to natural selection, people who lived in areas of intense sunlight developed dark skin colouration to protect against ultraviolet (UV) light, mainly to protect their body from folate depletion. Evolutionary pigmentation of the skin was caused by ultraviolet radiation of the sun. As hominids gradually lost their fur between 1.2 and 4 million years ago, to allow for better cooling through sweating, their naked and lightly pigmented skin was exposed to sunlight. In the tropics, natural selection favoured dark-skinned human populations as high levels of skin pigmentation protected against the harmful effects of sunlight. Indigenous populations' skin reflectance (the amount of sunlight the skin reflects) and the actual UV radiation in a particular geographic area is highly correlated, which supports this idea. Genetic evidence also supports this notion, demonstrating that around 1.2 million years ago there was a strong evolutionary pressure which acted on the development of dark skin pigmentation in early members of the genus Homo. The effect of sunlight on folic acid levels has been crucial in the development of dark skin.

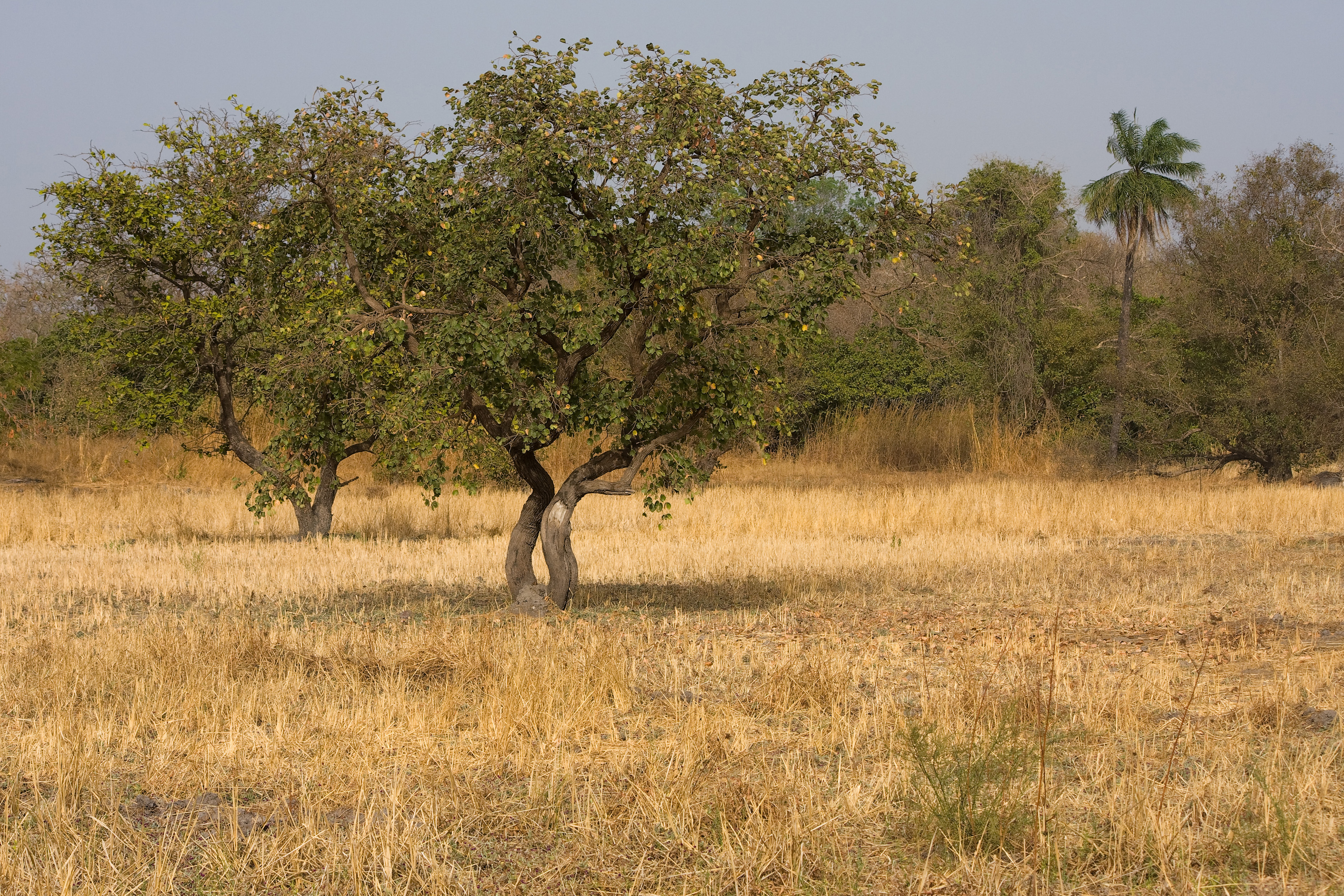
Savannas in Africa are where most of the hominid evolution of dark skin may have taken place

The earliest primate ancestors of modern humans most likely had pale skin, like our closest modern relative—the chimpanzee. About 7 million years ago human and chimpanzee lineages diverged, and between 4.5 and 2 million years ago early humans moved out of rainforests to the savannas of sub-Saharan Africa. They not only had to cope with more intense sunlight but had to develop a better cooling system. It was harder to get food in the hot savannas and as mammalian brains are prone to overheating—5 or 6 °C rise in temperature can lead to heatstroke—there was a need for the development of better heat regulation. The solution was sweating and loss of body hair.

Sweating dissipated heat through evaporation. Early humans, like chimpanzees now, had few sweat glands, and most of them were located in the palms of the hand and the soles of the feet. At times, individuals with more sweat glands were born. These humans could search for food and hunt for longer periods before being forced back to the shades. The more they could forage, the more and healthier offspring they could produce, and the higher the chance they had to pass on their genes for abundant sweat glands. With less hair, sweat could evaporate more easily and cool the bodies of humans faster. A few million years of evolution later, early humans had sparse body hair and more than 2 million sweat glands in their body.

Hairless skin, however, is particularly vulnerable to be damaged by ultraviolet light and this proved to be a problem for humans living in areas of intense UV radiation, and the evolutionary result was the development of dark-coloured skin as a protection. Scientists have long assumed that humans evolved melanin in order to absorb or scatter harmful sun radiation. Some researchers assumed that melanin protects against skin cancer. While high UV radiation can cause skin cancer, the development of cancer usually occurs after child-bearing age. As natural selection favours individuals with traits of reproductive success, skin cancer had little effect on the evolution of dark skin. Previous hypotheses suggested that sunburned nipples impeded breastfeeding, but a slight tan is enough to protect mothers against this issue.

A 1978 study examined the effect of sunlight on folate—a vitamin B complex—levels. The study found that even short periods of intense sunlight are able to halve folate levels if someone has light skin. Low folate levels are correlated with neural tube defects, such as anencephaly and spina bifida. UV rays can strip away folate, which is important to the development of healthy foetuses. In these abnormalities children are born with an incomplete brain or spinal cord. Nina Jablonski, a professor of anthropology and expert on evolution of human skin colouration, found several cases in which mothers' visits to tanning studios were connected to neural tube defects in early pregnancy. She also found that folate was crucial to sperm development; some male contraception drugs are based on folate inhibition. It has been found that folate may have been the driving force behind the evolution of dark skin.

As humans dispersed from equatorial Africa to low UVR areas and higher latitudes sometime between 120,000 and 65,000 years ago, dark skin posed a disadvantage. Populations with light skin pigmentation evolved in climates of little sunlight. Light skin pigmentation protects against vitamin D deficiency. It is known that dark-skinned people who have moved to climates of limited sunlight can develop vitamin D-related conditions such as rickets, and different forms of cancer.

A 2022 study revealed that traits such as dark skin show strong signals for Convergent evolution and selective pressure (positive Selection).

=== Other hypotheses ===
The main other hypotheses that have been put forward through history to explain the evolution of dark skin colouration relate to increased mortality due to skin cancers, enhanced fitness as a result of protection against sunburns, and increasing benefits due to antibacterial properties of eumelanin.

Darkly pigmented, eumelanin-rich skin protects against DNA damage caused by the sunlight. This is associated with lower skin cancer rates among dark-skinned populations. The presence of pheomelanin in light skin increases the oxidative stress in melanocytes, and this combined with the limited ability of pheomelanin to absorb UVR contributes to higher skin cancer rates among light-skinned individuals. The damaging effect of UVR on DNA structure and the entailing elevated skin cancer risk is widely recognized.

However, these cancer types usually affect people at the end or after their reproductive career and could have not been the evolutionary reason behind the development of dark skin pigmentation. Of all the major skin cancer types, only melanoma has a major effect in a person's reproductive age. However, because the mortality rates of melanoma have been very low before the mid-20th century (less than 5 per 100,000), it has therefore been argued that the low melanoma mortality rates during reproductive age cannot be the principal reason behind the development of dark skin pigmentation.

Studies have found that even serious sunburns could not affect sweat gland function and thermoregulation. There are no data or studies that support that sunburn can cause damage so seriously it can affect reproductive success.

Another group of hypotheses contended that dark skin pigmentation developed as antibacterial protection against tropical infectious diseases and parasites. Although it is true that eumelanin has antibacterial properties, its importance is secondary to 'physical adsorption' (physisorption) to protect against UVR-induced damage. This hypothesis is not consistent with the evidence that most of the hominid evolution took place in savanna environments and not in tropical rainforests. Humans living in hot and sunny environments have darker skin than humans who live in wet and cloudy environments. The antimicrobial hypothesis also does not explain why some populations (like the Inuit or Tibetans) who live far from the tropics and are exposed to high UVR have darker skin pigmentation than their surrounding populations.

== Biochemistry and genetics ==
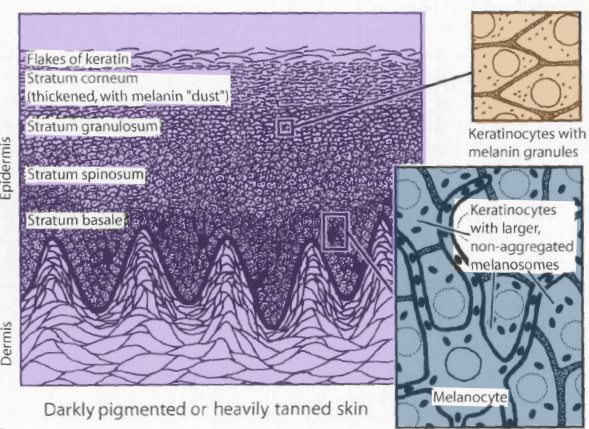
The layers in darkly pigmented skin

Dark-skinned humans have high amounts of melanin found in their skin. Melanin is derivative of the amino acid tyrosine. Eumelanin is the dominant form of melanin found in human skin. Eumelanin protects tissues and DNA from the radiation damage of UV light. Melanin is produced in specialized cells called melanocytes, which are found at the lowest level of the epidermis.

Melanin is produced inside small membrane-bound packages called melanosomes. People with naturally occurring dark skin have melanosomes which are clumped, large and full of eumelanin. A four-fold difference in naturally occurring dark skin gives seven- to eight-fold protection against DNA damage, but even the darkest skin colour cannot protect against all damage to DNA.

Dark skin offers great protection against UVR because of its eumelanin content, the UVR-absorbing capabilities of large melanosomes, and because eumelanin can be mobilized faster and brought to the surface of the skin from the depths of the epidermis. For the same body region, light- and dark-skinned individuals have similar numbers of melanocytes (there is considerable variation between different body regions), but pigment-containing organelles, called melanosomes, are larger and more numerous in dark-skinned individuals.

Keratocytes from dark skin cocultured with melanocytes give rise to a melanosome distribution pattern characteristic of dark skin. Melanosomes are not in aggregated state in darkly pigmented skin compared to lightly pigmented skin. Due to the heavily melanised melanosomes in darkly pigmented skin, it can absorb more energy from UVR and thus offers better protection against sunburns and by absorption and dispersion UV rays.

Darkly pigmented skin protects against direct and indirect DNA damage. Photodegration occurs when melanin absorbs photons. Recent research suggest that the photoprotective effect of dark skin is increased by the fact that melanin can capture free radicals, such as hydrogen peroxide, which are created by the interaction of UVR and layers of the skin. Heavily pigmented melanocytes have greater capacity to divide after ultraviolet irradiation, which suggests that they receive less damage to their DNA. Despite this, medium-wave ultraviolet radiation (UVB) damages the immune system even in darker skinned individuals due to its effect on Langerhans cells. The stratum corneum of people with dark or heavily tanned skin is more condensed and contains more cornified cell layers than in lightly pigmented humans. These qualities of dark skin enhance the barrier protection function of the skin.

Although darkly pigmented skin absorbs about 30 to 40% more sunlight than lightly pigmented skin, dark skin does not increase the body's internal heat intake in conditions of intense solar radiation. Solar radiation heats up the body's surface and not the interior. Furthermore, this amount of heat is negligible compared to the heat produced when muscles are actively used during exercise. Regardless of skin colour, humans have excellent capabilities to dissipate heat through sweating. Half of the solar radiation reaching the Earth's surface is in the form of infrared light and is absorbed similarly regardless of skin colouration.

In people with naturally occurring dark skin, the tanning occurs with the dramatic mobilization of melanin upward in the epidermis and continues with the increased production of melanin. This accounts for the fact that dark-skinned people get visibly darker after one or two weeks of sun exposure, and then lose their colour after months when they stay out of the sun. Darkly pigmented people tend to exhibit fewer signs of aging in their skin than the lightly pigmented because their dark skin protects them from most photoaging.

Skin colour is a polygenic trait, which means that several different genes are involved in determining a specific phenotype. Many genes work together in complex, additive, and non-additive combinations to determine the skin colour of an individual. The skin colour variations are normally distributed from light to dark, as it is usual for polygenic traits.

Data collected from studies on MC1R gene has shown that there is a lack of diversity in dark-skinned African samples in the allele of the gene compared to non-African populations. This is remarkable given that the number of polymorphisms for almost all genes in the human gene pool is greater in African samples than in any other geographic region. So, while the MC1Rf gene does not significantly contribute to variation in skin colour around the world, the allele found in high levels in African populations probably protects against UV radiation and was probably important in the evolution of dark skin.

Skin colour seems to vary mostly due to variations in a number of genes of large effect as well as several other genes of small effect (TYR, TYRP1, OCA2, SLC45A2, SLC24A5, MC1R, KITLG and SLC24A4). This does not take into account the effects of epistasis, which would probably increase the number of related genes. Variations in the SLC24A5 gene account for 20–25% of the variation between dark- and light-skinned populations of Africa, and appear to have arisen as recently as within the last 10,000 years. The Ala111Thr or rs1426654 polymorphism in the coding region of the SLC24A5 gene reaches fixation in Europe, and is also common among populations in North Africa, the Horn of Africa, West Asia, Central Asia and South Asia.

== Health implications ==
Skin pigmentation is an evolutionary adaptation to various UVR levels around the world. As a consequence there are many health implications that are the product of population movements of humans of certain skin pigmentation to new environments with different levels of UVR. Modern humans are often ignorant of their evolutionary history at their peril. Cultural practices that increase problems of conditions among dark-skinned populations are traditional clothing and vitamin D-poor diet.

=== Advantages in high sunlight ===
Dark-pigmented people living in high sunlight environments are at an advantage due to the high amounts of melanin produced in their skin. The dark pigmentation protects from DNA damage and absorbs the right amounts of UV radiation needed by the body, as well as protects against folate depletion. Folate is a water-soluble vitamin B complex which naturally occurs in green, leafy vegetables, whole grains, and citrus fruits. Women need folate to maintain healthy eggs, for proper implantation of eggs, and for the normal development of placenta after fertilization. Folate is needed for normal sperm production in men. Folate is essential for fetal growth, organ development, and neural tube development. Folate breaks down in high intensity UVR.

Dark-skinned women suffer the lowest level of neural tube defects. Folate plays an important role in DNA production and gene expression. It is essential for maintaining proper levels of amino acids which make up proteins. Folate is used in the formation of myelin, the sheath that covers nerve cells and makes it possible to send electrical signals quickly. Folate also plays an important role in the development of many neurotransmitters, e.g. serotonin which regulates appetite, sleep, and mood. Serum folate is broken down by UV radiation or alcohol consumption. Because the skin is protected by the melanin, dark-pigmented people have a lower chance of developing skin cancer and conditions related to folate deficiency, such as neural tube defects.

=== Disadvantages in low sunlight ===
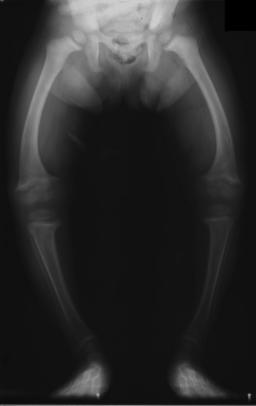
Rickets is a condition associated with dark skin.

Dark-skinned people living in low sunlight environments have been recorded to be very susceptible to vitamin D deficiency due to reduced vitamin D synthesis. A dark-skinned person requires about six times as much UVB than lightly pigmented persons. This is not a problem near the equator; however, it can be a problem at higher latitudes. For humans with dark skin in climates of low UVR, it can take about two hours to produce the same amount of vitamin D as humans with light skin produce in 15 minutes. Dark-skinned people having a high body-mass index and not taking vitamin D supplements were associated with vitamin D deficiency.

Vitamin D plays an important role in regulating the human immune system. Chronic deficiencies in vitamin D can make humans susceptible to specific types of cancers and many kinds of infectious diseases. Vitamin D deficiency increases the risk of developing tuberculosis five-fold and also contributes to the development of breast, prostate, and colourectal cancer.

The most prevalent disease to follow vitamin D deficiency is rickets, the softening of bones in children potentially leading to fractures and deformity. Rickets is caused by reduced vitamin D synthesis that causes an absence of vitamin D, which then causes the dietary calcium to not be properly absorbed. This disease in the past was commonly found among dark-skinned Americans of the southern part of the United States who migrated north into low sunlight environments. The popularity of sugary drinks and decreased time spent outside have contributed to significant rise of developing rickets. Deformities of the female pelvis related to severe rickets impair normal childbirth, which leads to higher mortality of the infant, mother, or both.

Vitamin D deficiency is most common in regions with low sunlight, especially in the winter. Chronic deficiencies in vitamin D may also be linked with breast, prostate, colon, ovarian, and possibly other types of cancers. The relationship between cardiovascular disease and vitamin D deficiency also suggest a link between health of cardiac and smooth muscle. Low vitamin D levels have also been linked to impaired immune system and brain functions. In addition, recent studies have linked vitamin D deficiency to autoimmune diseases, hypertension, multiple sclerosis, diabetes and incidence of memory loss.

Outside the tropics UVR has to penetrate through a thicker layer of atmosphere, which results in most of the intermediate wavelength UVB reflected or destroyed en route; because of this there is less potential for vitamin D biosynthesis in regions far from the equator. Higher amount of vitamin D intake for dark-skinned people living in regions with low levels of sunlight are advised by doctors to follow a vitamin D-rich diet or take vitamin D supplements, although there is recent evidence that dark-skinned individuals are able to process vitamin D more efficiently than lighter-skinned individuals so may have a lower threshold of sufficiency.

== Geographic distribution ==
There is a correlation between the geographic distribution of UV radiation (UVR) and the distribution of skin pigmentation around the world. Areas that have higher amounts of UVR have darker-skinned populations, generally located nearer the equator. Areas that are further away from the equator and generally closer to the poles have a lower concentration of UVR and contain lighter-skinned populations. This is the result of human evolution which contributed to variable melanin content in the skin to adapt to certain environments.

A larger percentage of dark-skinned people are found in the Southern Hemisphere because latitudinal land mass distribution is disproportionate. The present distribution of skin colour variation does not completely reflect the correlation of intense UVR and dark skin pigmentation due to mass migration and movement of peoples across continents in the recent past. Dark-skinned populations inhabiting Africa, Australia, Melanesia, South Asia, Southeast Asia, West Asia and South America live in some of the areas with the highest UV radiation in the world, and have evolved very dark skin pigmentations as protection from the sun's harmful rays.

Evolution has restricted humans with darker skin in tropical latitudes, especially in non-forested regions, where ultraviolet radiation from the sun is usually the most intense. Different dark-skinned populations are not necessarily closely related genetically. Before the modern mass migration, it has been argued that the majority of dark-pigmented people lived within 20° of the equator.

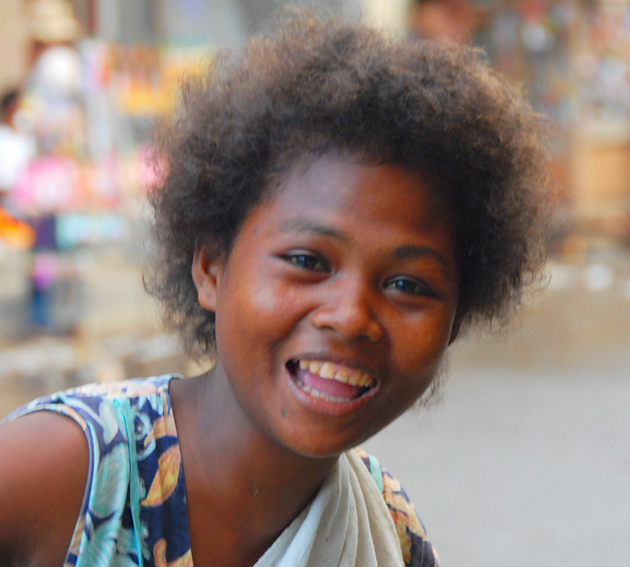
Ati woman, Philippines – the Negritos are an indigenous people of Southeast Asia.

Natives of Buka and Bougainville at the northern Solomon Islands in Melanesia and the Chopi people of Mozambique in the southeast coast of Africa have darker skin than other surrounding populations. The native people of the Autonomous Region of Bougainville have some of the darkest skin pigmentation in the world. Although these people are widely separated they share similar physical environments. In both regions, they experience very high UVR exposure from cloudless skies near the equator which is reflected from water or sand. Water reflects, depending on colour, about 10 to 30% of UVR that falls on it.

People in these populations spend long hours fishing on the sea. Because it is impractical to wear extensive clothing in a watery environment, culture and technology does little to buffer UVR exposure. The skin takes a very large amount of ultraviolet radiation. These populations are probably near or at the maximum darkness that human skin can achieve.

More recent research has found that human populations over the past 50,000 years have changed from dark-skinned to light-skinned and vice versa. Only 100–200 generations ago, the ancestors of most people living today likely also resided in a different place and had a different skin colour. According to Nina Jablonski, darkly pigmented modern populations in South India and Sri Lanka are an example of this, having re-darkened after their ancestors migrated down from areas much farther north. Scientists originally believed that such shifts in pigmentation occurred relatively slowly. However, researchers have since observed that changes in skin colouration can happen in as little as 100 generations (~2,500 years), with no intermarriage required. The speed of change is also affected by clothing, which tends to slow it down.

=== Australia ===
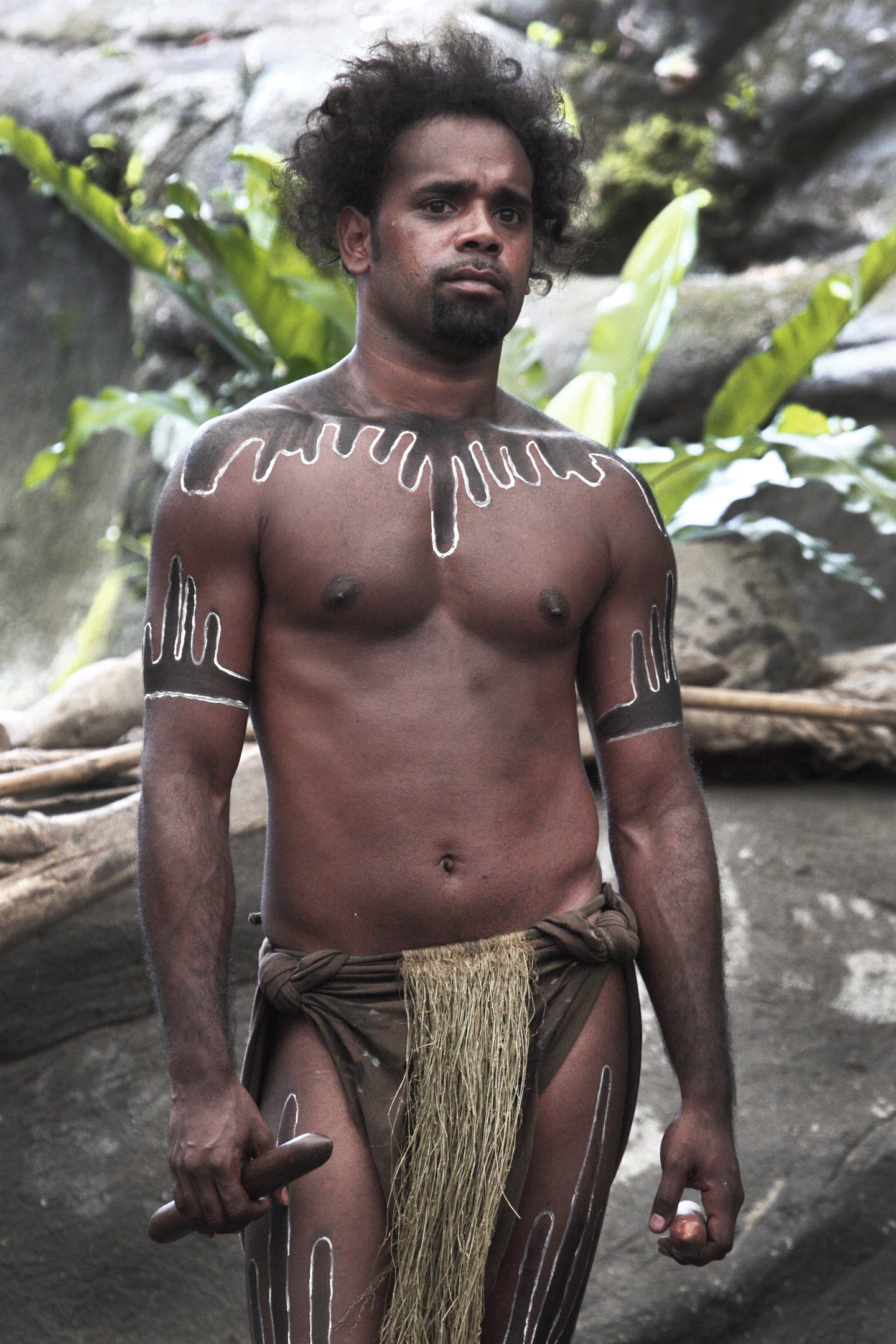
An Aboriginal Australian man with dark skin

Indigenous Australians, as with all other populations outside of Africa, are descendants of the Out-of-Africa wave. Genetic evidence has pointed out that the Indigenous peoples of Australia are genetically dissimilar to the dark-skinned populations of Africa and that they are more closely related to other non-African populations.

The term black initially has been applied as a reference to the skin pigmentation of Indigenous Australians; today it has been embraced by Aboriginal activists as a term for shared culture and identity, regardless of skin colour.

=== Melanesia ===
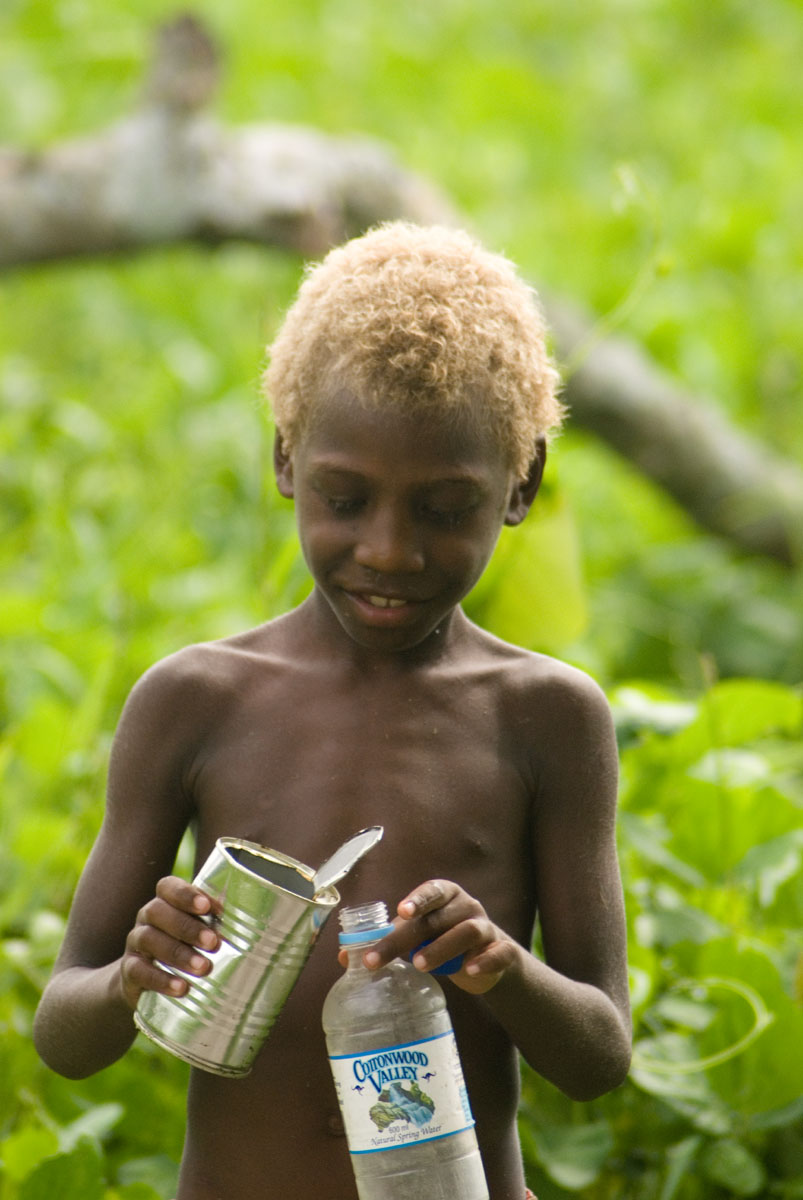
A dark-skinned blond boy from Vanuatu, Melanesia

Melanesia, a subregion of Oceania, whose name means "black islands", have several islands that are inhabited by people with dark skin pigmentation. The islands of Melanesia are located immediately north and northeast of Australia as well as east coast of Papua New Guinea. The western end of Melanesia from New Guinea through the Solomon Islands were first colonized by humans about 40,000 to 29,000 years ago.

In the world, blond hair is exceptionally rare outside Europe, North Africa and West Asia, especially among dark-skinned populations. However, Melanesians are one of the dark-skinned human populations known to have naturally occurring blond hair.

==== New Guinea ====
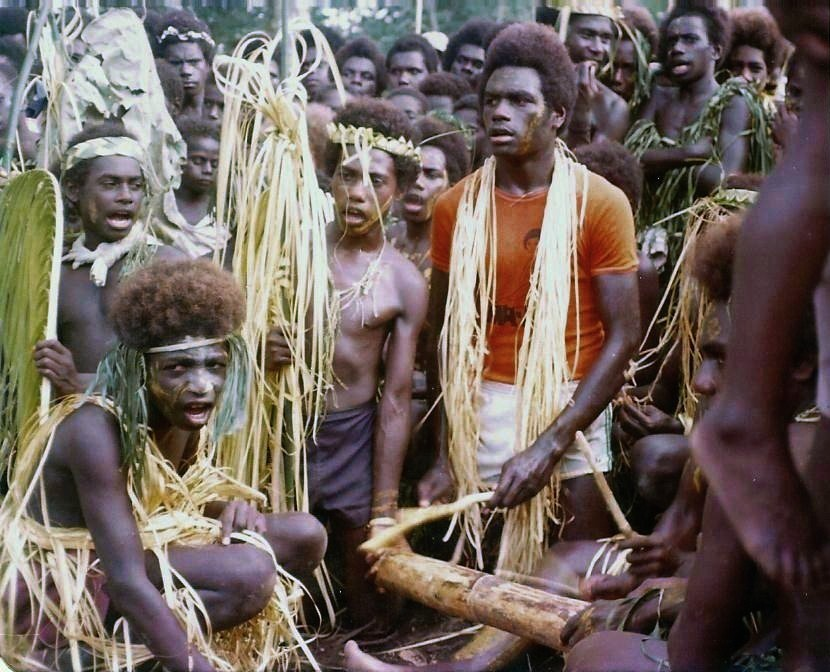
Buka boys from Bougainville Island, Papua New Guinea. People from Bougainville have some of the darkest skin tones among humans.

The indigenous Papuan people of New Guinea have dark skin pigmentation and have inhabited the island for at least 40,000 years. Due to their similar phenotype and the location of New Guinea being in the migration route taken by Indigenous Australians, it was generally believed that Papuans and Aboriginal Australians shared a common origin. However, a 1999 study failed to find clear indications of a single shared genetic origin between the two populations, suggesting multiple waves of migration into Sahul with distinct ancestries.

=== Sub-Saharan Africa ===
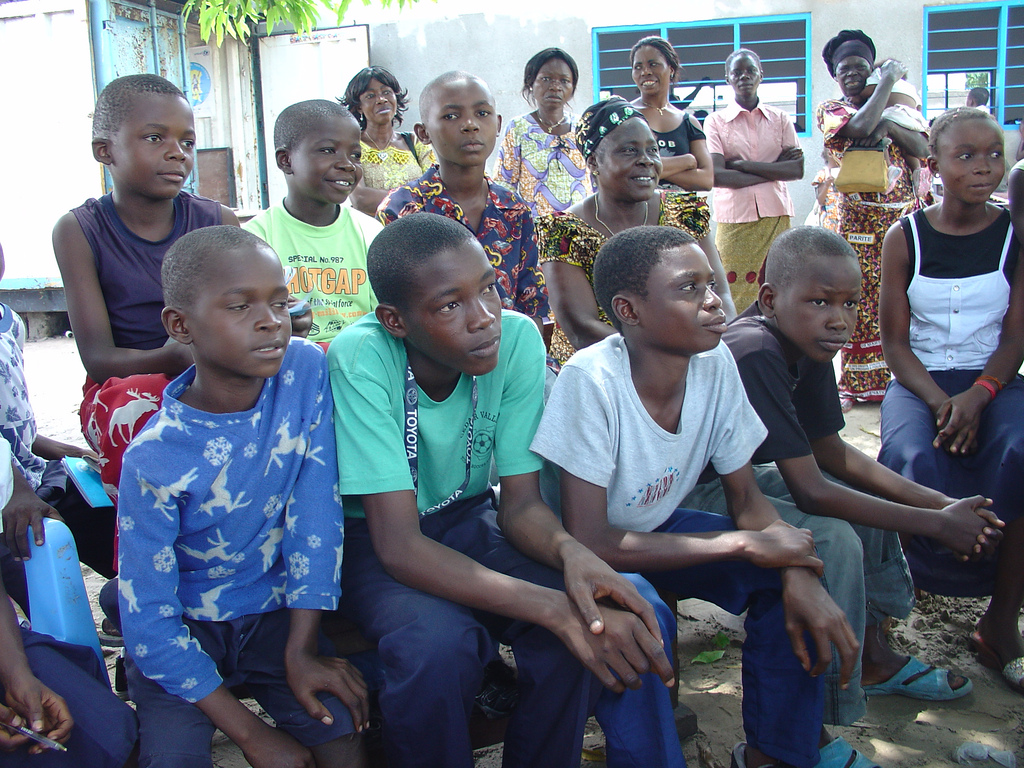
People from Congo

Sub-Saharan Africa is the region in Africa situated south of the Sahara where a large number of dark-skinned populations live. Dark-skinned groups on the continent have the same receptor protein as Homo ergaster and Homo erectus had. According to scientific studies, populations in Africa also have the highest skin colour diversity. High levels of skin colour variation exists between different populations in Sub-Saharan Africa. These differences depend in part on general distance from the equator, illustrating the complex interactions of evolutionary forces which have contributed to the geographic distribution of skin colour at any point of time.

Due to frequently differing ancestry among dark-skinned populations, the presence of dark skin in general is not a reliable genetic marker, including among groups in Africa. For example, Wilson et al. (2001) found that most of their Ethiopian samples showed closer genetic affinities with lighter-skinned Armenians than with darker-skinned Bantu populations. Mohamoud (2006) likewise observed that their Somali samples were genetically more similar to Arab populations than to other African populations.

=== South Asia ===
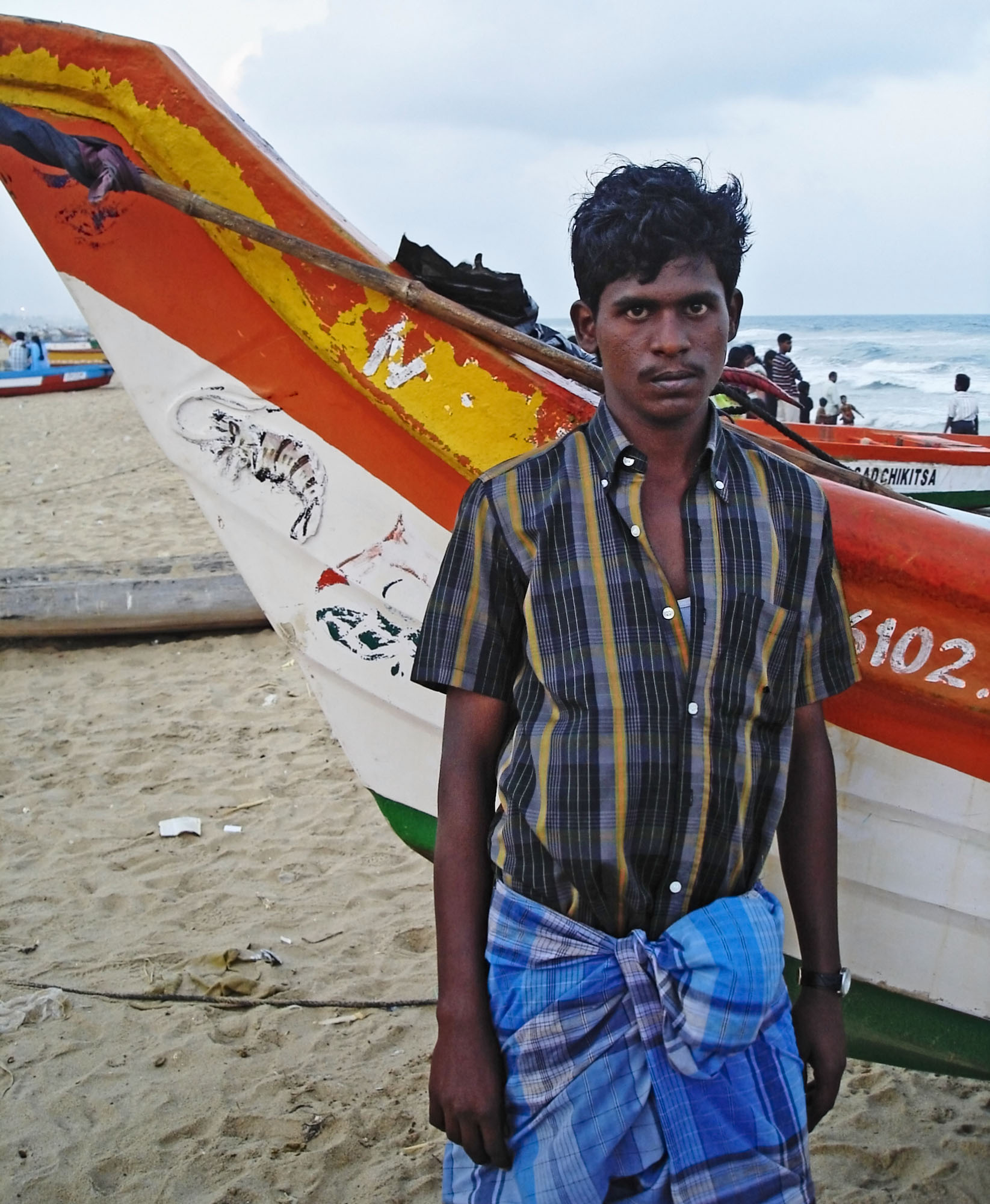
Fisherman from Chennai, Tamil Nadu in southern India.

South Asia has some of the greatest skin colour diversity outside of Africa. Skin colour among South Indians is on average darker than North Indians. This is mainly because of the weather conditions in South Asia—higher UV indices are in the south. Several genetic surveys of South Asian populations in different regions have found a weak negative correlation between social status and skin darkness, represented by the melanin index.

Tamils and Dravidian people descended from the original inhabitants of India. They have a dark skin tone because those original inhabitants were a dark skinned people who had migrated from out of Africa into India and other surrounding areas about 65,000 years ago.

A study of caste populations in the Gangetic Plain found an association between the proportion of dark skin and ranking in the caste hierarchy. Dalits had, on average, the darkest skin. A pan-India study of Telugu and North Indian castes found a similar correlation between skin colour and caste association, linked to the absence of the rs1426654-A variant of the SLC245-A gene, but are also linked to mutations overriding these variants.

=== Americas ===
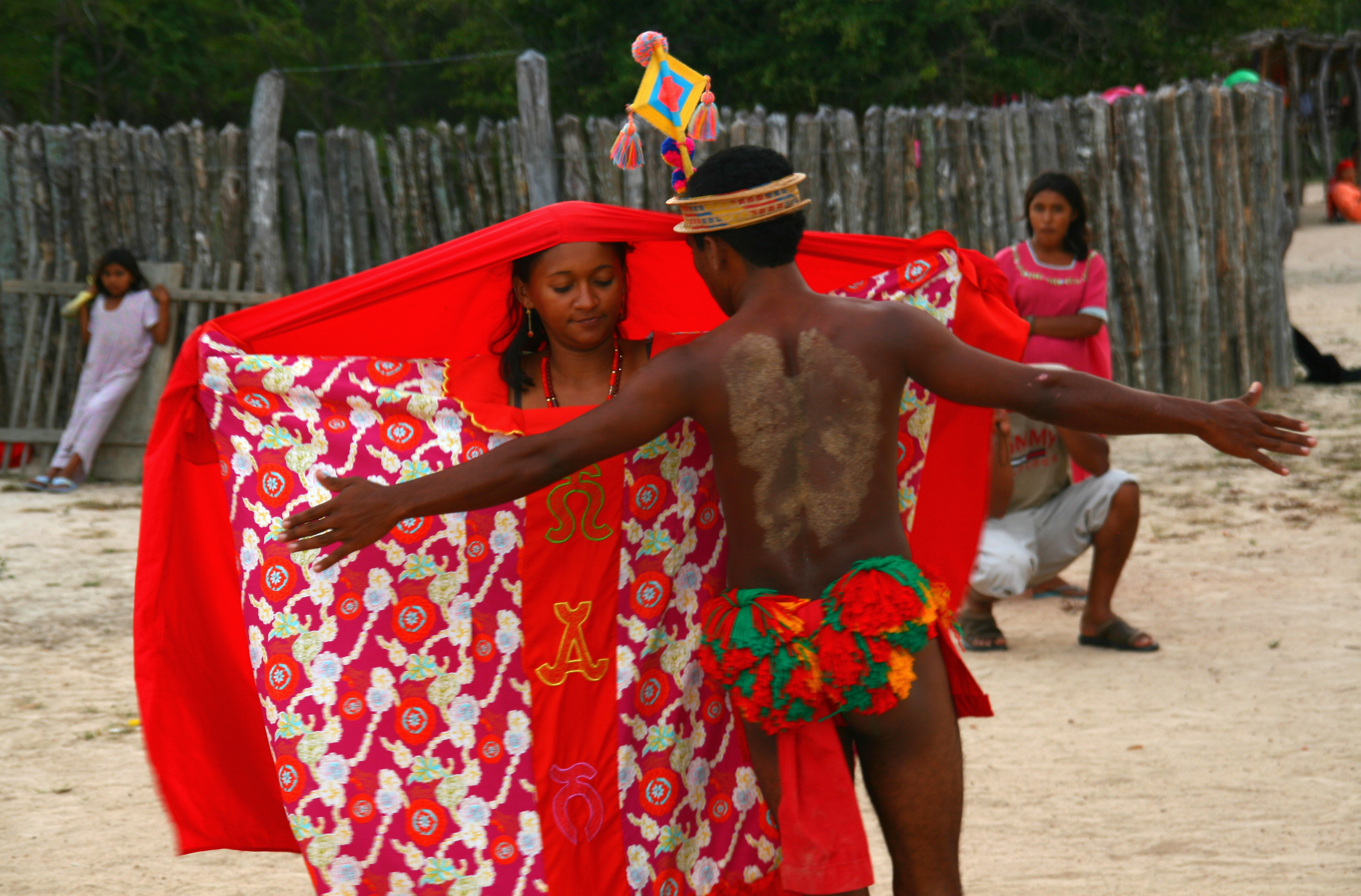
A dark-skinned Wayuu couple from Colombia. Many other Indigenous peoples of tropical or subtropical areas of the Americas have dark skin.

Relatively dark skin remains among the Inuit and other Arctic populations. A combination of protein-heavy diets and summer snow reflection have been speculated as favouring the retention of pigmented skin.

Earliest European colonial descriptions of North American populations include terms such as "brown", "tawny" or "olive", though some populations were also described as "light-skinned". Most North American indigenous populations rank similar to African and Oceanian populations in regards to the presence of the allele Ala111.

Native South Americans and Mesoamericans are also typically considered dark-skinned. High ultraviolet radiation levels occur throughout the Andes region of Peru, Bolivia, Chile, and Argentina.

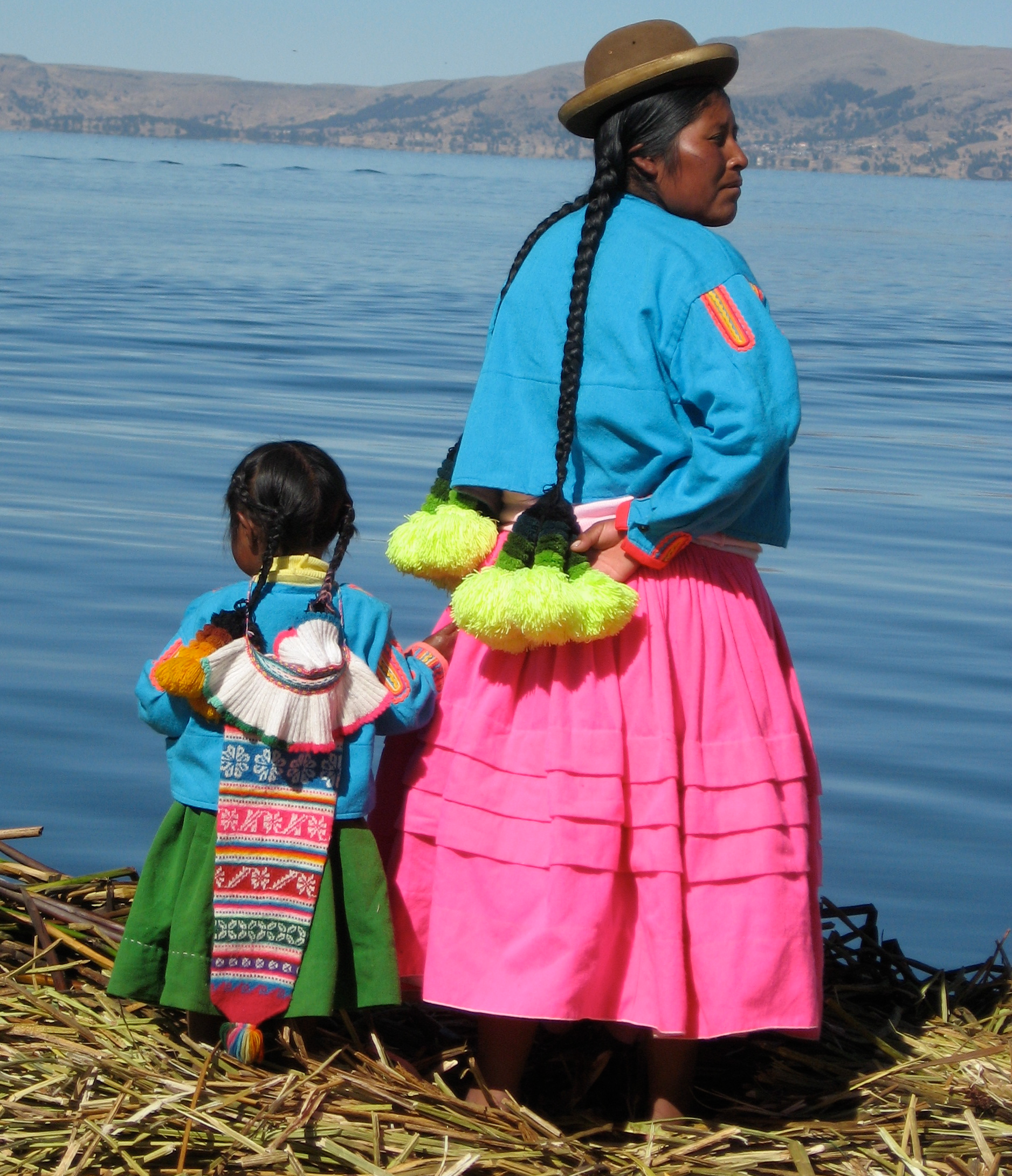
An Indigenous mother and daughter from the Urus islands.

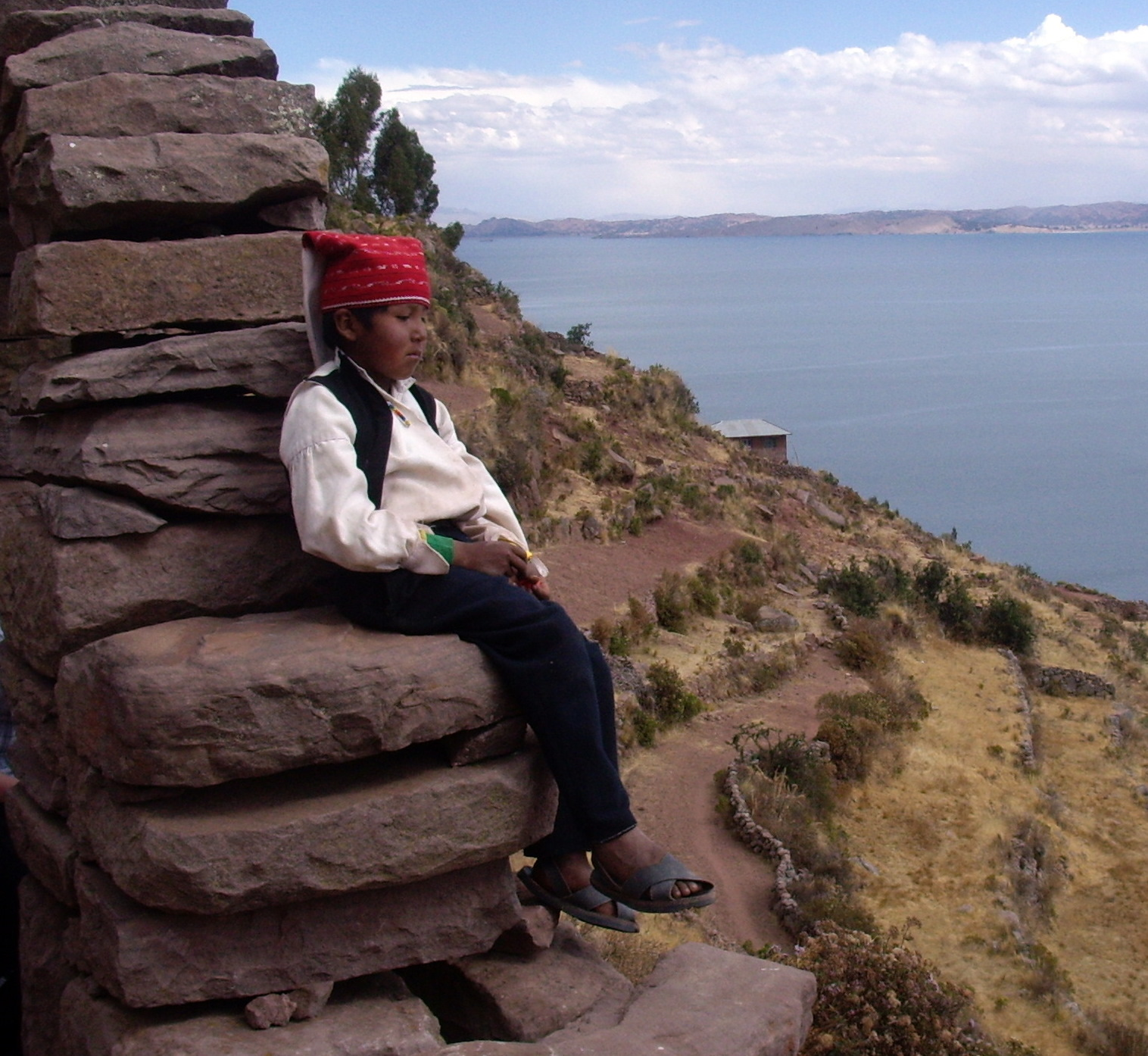
An indigenous boy from Peru.

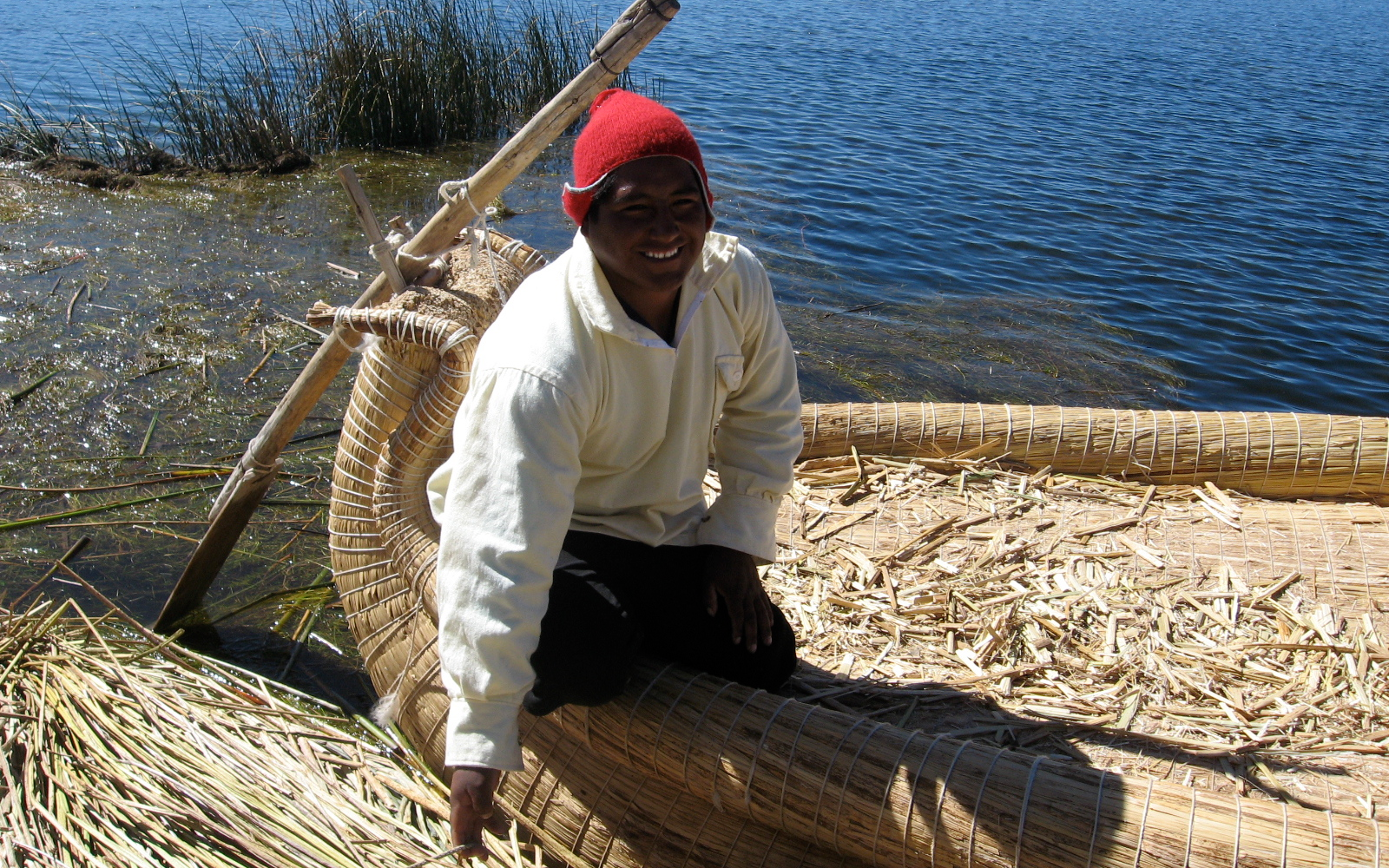
An indigenous fisherman from Lake Titicaca.

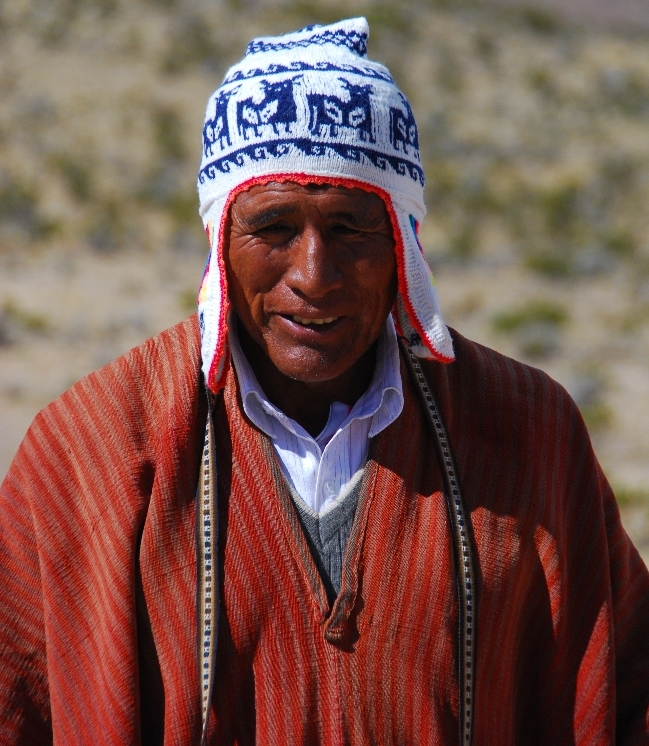
A man from Bolivia.

== Culture ==
The preference or disfavour for darker skin has varied depending on geographical area and time.

== See also ==
- Albinism in humans
- Brown (racial classification)
- Olive skin
