= San Buenaventura District, Marañón =

San Buenaventura District
- District
- Interactive map of San Buenaventura District
- Country: Peru
- Region: Huánuco
- Province: Marañón
- Founded: October 31, 1955
- Capital: San Buenaventura

Government
  - Mayor: Eusebio Solano Mattos

Area
  - Total: 86.54 km^{2} (33.41 sq mi)
- Elevation: 3,200 m (10,500 ft)

Population (2005 census)
  - Total: 2,185
  - Density: 25.25/km^{2} (65.39/sq mi)
- Time zone: UTC-5 (PET)
- UBIGEO: 100703

San Buenaventura District is one of three districts of the province Marañón in Peru.

== Ethnic groups ==
The people in the district are mainly indigenous citizens of Quechua descent. Quechua is the language which the majority of the population (92.78%) learnt to speak in childhood, 6.52% of the residents started speaking using the Spanish language (2007 Peru Census).
