= Canchabamba District =

Coordinates: 8.8520°S 77.1451°W

Canchabamba Kanchapampa
- District
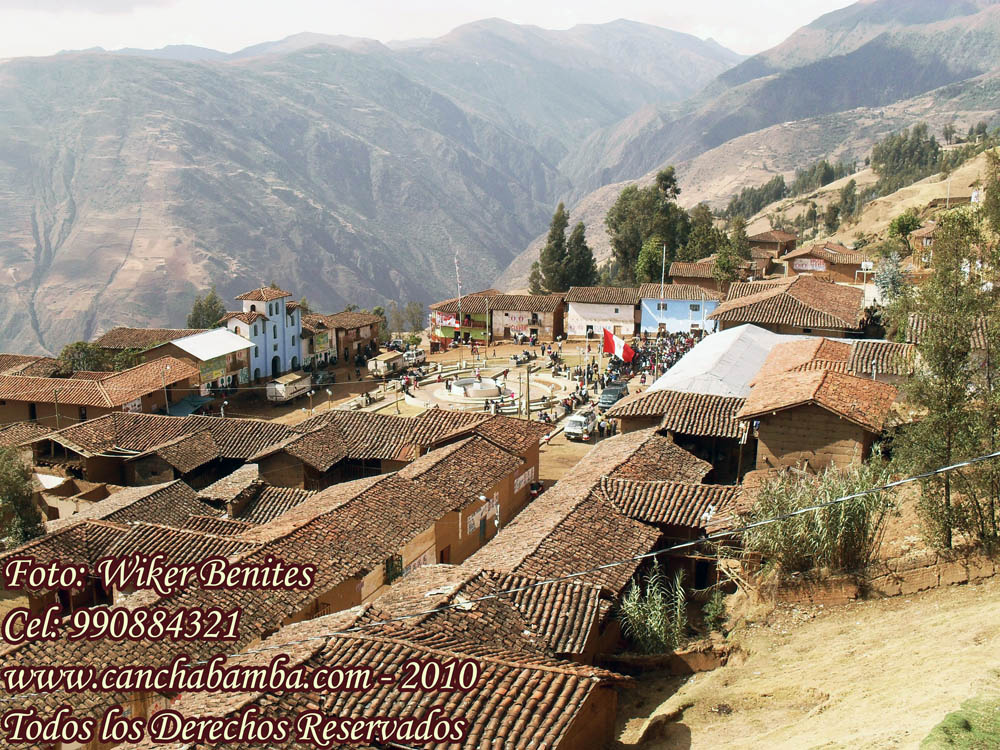
- Interactive map of Canchabamba
- Country: Peru
- Region: Huánuco
- Province: Huacaybamba
- Founded: November 14, 1985
- Capital: Canchabamba

Area
  - Total: 186.83 km^{2} (72.14 sq mi)
- Elevation: 3,200 m (10,500 ft)

Population (2005 census)
  - Total: 3,217
  - Density: 17.22/km^{2} (44.60/sq mi)
- Time zone: UTC-5 (PET)
- UBIGEO: 100402

Canchabamba District is one of four districts of the province Huacaybamba in Peru.

== Ethnic groups ==
The people in the district are mainly indigenous citizens of Quechua descent. Quechua is the language which the majority of the population (96.97%) learnt to speak in childhood, 2.56% of the residents started speaking using the Spanish language (2007 Peru Census).

== See also ==
- Marañón River
- Yanamayu
