= Cochabamba District, Huacaybamba =

Coordinates: 9.0662°S 76.8693°W

Cochabamba Quchapampa
- District
- Interactive map of Cochabamba; Quchapampa
- Country: Peru
- Region: Huánuco
- Province: Huacaybamba
- Founded: November 14, 1985
- Capital: Cochabamba

Government
  - Mayor: Jaimes Cerna Hurtado

Area
  - Total: 686.95 km^{2} (265.23 sq mi)
- Elevation: 3,275 m (10,745 ft)

Population (2005 census)
  - Total: 2,339
  - Density: 3.405/km^{2} (8.819/sq mi)
- Time zone: UTC-5 (PET)
- UBIGEO: 100403

Cochabamba District (Quechua: Quchapampa, qucha means "lake" and pampa means "plain") is one of the four districts of the province Huacaybamba in Peru.

== Ethnic groups ==
The people in the district are mainly indigenous citizens of Quechua descent. Quechua is the language which the majority of the population (50.29%) learned to speak in childhood, 49.12% of the residents started speaking using the Spanish language (2007 Peru Census).

== See also ==
- Hatun Hirka
- Kinwaqucha
- Puchkayuq
