= Puchkayuq =

Mountain in Peru

- Location within Peru

Highest point
- Elevation: 3,800 m (12,500 ft)
- Coordinates: 9°04′06″S 76°53′06″W

Geography
- Location: Huánuco Region
- Parent range: Andes

Puchkayuq (Quechua puchka spindle, -yuq a suffix, "the one with a spindle", also spelled Pushcayoc) is a mountain in the Andes of Peru which reaches a height of approximately 3,800 m (12,500 ft). It is located in the Huánuco Region, Huacaybamba Province, Cochabamba District.
