= Huacaybamba District =

Coordinates: 9.0825°S 76.8328°W

Huacaybamba
- District
- Interactive map of Huacaybamba
- Country: Peru
- Region: Huánuco
- Province: Huacaybamba
- Capital: Huacaybamba

Area
  - Total: 586.21 km^{2} (226.34 sq mi)
- Elevation: 3,168 m (10,394 ft)

Population (2005 census)
  - Total: 6,048
  - Density: 10.32/km^{2} (26.72/sq mi)
- Time zone: UTC-5 (PET)
- UBIGEO: 100401

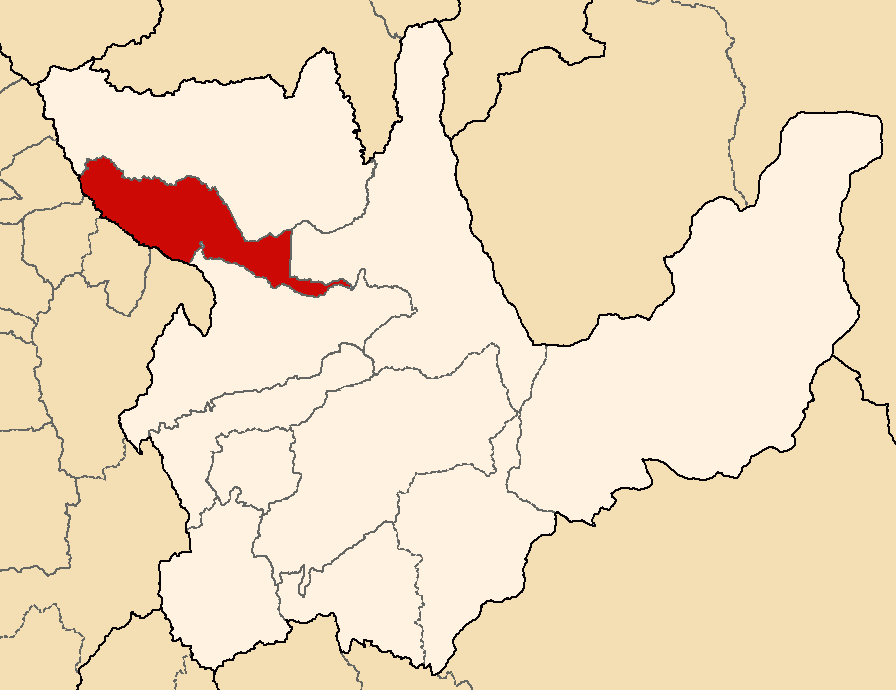
Province Huacaybamba in the Huánuco region

Huacaybamba District is one of four districts of the province Huacaybamba in Peru. The district was created in 1857 during the presidency of Ramón Castilla.

== Ethnic groups ==
The people in the district are mainly indigenous citizens of Quechua descent. Quechua is the language which the majority of the population (65.93%) learnt to speak in childhood, 33.42% of the residents started speaking using the Spanish language (2007 Peru Census).
