= Skin reflectance =

Human skin color measurement

In anthropology, reflectometry devices are often used to gauge human skin color through the measurement of skin reflectance. These devices are typically pointed at the upper arm or forehead, with the emitted waves then interpreted at various percentages. Lower percentages represent lower skin reflectance and thus darker pigmentation, whereas higher percentages represent greater skin reflectance and therefore lighter pigmentation.

Below are global estimates of skin reflectance percentages in various countries, populations and areas as observed and predicted by Jablonski and Chaplin.

#	Country/Population/Area	Hemisphere	Reflectance site	Observed reflectance at 685 nm	Predicted reflectance at 685 nm
1	Afghanistan/Iran	Northern hemisphere	Upper inner arm	55.70	45.55
2	Algeria (Aures)	Northern hemisphere	Upper inner arm	58.05	47.91
3	Australia (Darwin)	Southern hemisphere	Upper inner arm	19.30	36.24
4	Belgium	Northern hemisphere	Upper inner arm	63.14	65.66
5	Botswana (San)	Southern hemisphere	Upper inner arm	42.40	39.45
6	Brazil (Caingan)	Southern hemisphere	Upper inner arm	49.40	48.53
7	Brazil (Guaraní)	Southern hemisphere	Upper inner arm	47.20	45.29
8	Burkina Faso (Kurumba)	Northern hemisphere	Upper inner arm	28.60	34.23
9	Cambodia	Northern hemisphere	Upper inner arm	54.00	38.99
10	Cameroon (Fali)	Northern hemisphere	Upper inner arm	21.50	34.37
11	Chad (Sara)	Northern hemisphere	Upper inner arm	24.60	34.77
12	China (Southern)	Northern hemisphere	Upper inner arm	59.17	59.49
13	China (Tibet)	Northern hemisphere	Upper inner arm	54.70	41.78
14	Eswatini	Northern hemisphere	Upper inner arm	35.60	44.62
15	Ethiopia	Northern hemisphere	Upper inner arm	31.70	32.70
16	Ethiopia (Highland)	Northern hemisphere	Upper inner arm	33.55	31.35
17	Germany (Mainz)	Northern hemisphere	Upper inner arm	66.90	65.21
18	Greenland (Southern)	Northern hemisphere	Upper inner arm	55.70	70.31
19	India	Northern hemisphere	Upper inner arm	44.60	48.85
20	India (Bengal)	Northern hemisphere	Upper inner arm	49.73	44.33
21	India (Goa)	Northern hemisphere	Upper inner arm	46.40	38.93
22	India (Nagpur)	Northern hemisphere	Upper inner arm	41.30	41.53
23	India (Northern)	Northern hemisphere	Upper inner arm	53.26	44.23
24	India (Orissa)	Northern hemisphere	Upper inner arm	32.05	41.52
25	India (Punjab)	Northern hemisphere	Upper inner arm	54.24	47.89
26	India (Rajasthan)	Northern hemisphere	Upper inner arm	52.00	42.19
27	India (Southern)	Northern hemisphere	Upper inner arm	46.70	37.60
28	Iraq/Syria (Kurds)	Northern hemisphere	Upper inner arm	61.12	51.50
29	Ireland (Ballinlough)	Northern hemisphere	Upper inner arm	65.20	67.11
30	Ireland (Carnew)	Northern hemisphere	Upper inner arm	64.50	65.84
31	Ireland (Longford)	Northern hemisphere	Upper inner arm	65.00	66.99
32	Ireland (Rossmore)	Northern hemisphere	Upper inner arm	64.75	66.73
33	Israel	Northern hemisphere	Upper inner arm	58.20	48.67
34	Israel (Kurdish Jews)	Northern hemisphere	Medial aspect of upper arm	54.89–60.02	
35	Israel (Yemeni Jews)	Northern hemisphere	Medial aspect of upper arm	53.15–56.94	
36	Japan (Central)	Northern hemisphere	Upper inner arm	55.42	58.51
37	Japan (Hidakka)	Northern hemisphere	Upper inner arm	59.10	63.58
38	Japan (Northern)	Northern hemisphere	Upper inner arm	54.90	61.34
39	Japan (Southwest)	Northern hemisphere	Upper inner arm	53.55	56.68
40	Jordan	Northern hemisphere	Upper inner arm	55.42	58.51
41	Jordan (Arabs)	Northern hemisphere	Forehead	44.2–47.1	
42	Jordan (Arabs)	Northern hemisphere	Medial aspect of upper arm	48.0–52.7	
43	Jordan (Chechen)	Northern hemisphere	Forehead	50.9–52.5	
44	Jordan (Chechen)	Northern hemisphere	Medial aspect of upper arm	51.9–55.0	
45	Jordan (Druze, males)	Northern hemisphere	Forehead	48.5	
46	Jordan (Druze, males)	Northern hemisphere	Medial aspect of upper arm	52.8	
47	Kenya	Northern hemisphere	Upper inner arm	32.40	34.21
48	Lebanon	Northern hemisphere	Upper inner arm	58.20	50.74
49	Liberia	Northern hemisphere	Upper inner arm	29.40	40.52
50	Libya (Cyrenaica)	Northern hemisphere	Upper inner arm	53.50	44.19
51	Libya (Fezzan)	Northern hemisphere	Upper inner arm	44.00	41.31
52	Libya (Tripoli)	Northern hemisphere	Upper inner arm	54.40	48.83
53	Malawi	Southern hemisphere	Upper inner arm	27.00	38.67
54	Mali (Dogon)	Northern hemisphere	Upper inner arm	34.10	34.54
55	Morocco	Northern hemisphere	Upper inner arm	54.85	49.09
56	Mozambique (Chopi)	Southern hemisphere	Upper inner arm	19.45	43.84
57	Namibia	Southern hemisphere	Upper inner arm	25.55	38.29
58	Namibia (Okavango)	Southern hemisphere	Upper inner arm	22.92	38.63
59	Namibia (Reheboth Baster)	Southern hemisphere	Upper inner arm	32.90	36.49
60	Nepal (Eastern)	Northern hemisphere	Upper inner arm	50.42	46.31
61	Netherlands	Northern hemisphere	Upper inner arm	67.37	65.94
62	Nigeria (Ebo)	Northern hemisphere	Upper inner arm	28.20	41.86
63	Nigeria (Yoruba)	Northern hemisphere	Upper inner arm	27.40	39.62
64	Pakistan	Northern hemisphere	Upper inner arm	52.30	44.15
65	Papua New Guinea	Southern hemisphere	Upper inner arm	35.30	37.26
66	Papua New Guinea (Goroka)	Southern hemisphere	Upper inner arm	33.30	34.20
67	Papua New Guinea (Karker)	Southern hemisphere	Upper inner arm	32.00	37.25
68	Papua New Guinea (Lufa)	Southern hemisphere	Upper inner arm	31.20	36.88
69	Papua New Guinea (Mount Hagan)	Southern hemisphere	Upper inner arm	35.35	31.56
70	Papua New Guinea (Port Moresby)	Southern hemisphere	Upper inner arm	41.00	35.45
71	Peru (Maranon)	Southern hemisphere	Upper inner arm	43.05	42.28
72	Peru (Nunoa)	Southern hemisphere	Upper inner arm	47.70	34.89
73	Philippines (Manila)	Northern hemisphere	Upper inner arm	54.10	41.53
74	Russia (Chechen)	Northern hemisphere	Upper inner arm	53.45	59.04
75	Saudi Arabia	Northern hemisphere	Upper inner arm	52.50	38.65
76	South Africa	Northern hemisphere	Upper inner arm	42.50	45.67
77	South Africa (Cape)	Northern hemisphere	Upper inner arm	50.96	50.71
78	South Africa (Hottentot)	Northern hemisphere	Upper inner arm	46.80	43.91
79	South Africa (San Central)	Northern hemisphere	Upper inner arm	43.75	41.14
80	Spain (Basques)	Northern hemisphere	Upper inner arm	65.70	62.38
81	Spain (Leon)	Northern hemisphere	Upper inner arm	64.66	60.80
82	Sudan	Northern hemisphere	Upper inner arm	35.50	33.45
83	Tanzania (Nyatura)	Northern hemisphere	Upper inner arm	25.80	34.12
84	Tanzania (Sandewe)	Northern hemisphere	Upper inner arm	28.90	32.13
85	Tunisia	Northern hemisphere	Upper inner arm	56.30	52.03
86	Turkey	Northern hemisphere	Upper inner arm	59.15	55.56
87	United Kingdom (Cumberland)	Northern hemisphere	Upper inner arm	66.75	66.99
88	United Kingdom (London)	Northern hemisphere	Upper inner arm	62.30	65.84
89	United Kingdom (Northern)	Northern hemisphere	Upper inner arm	66.10	67.49
90	United Kingdom (Wales)	Northern hemisphere	Upper inner arm	65.00	66.15
91	Vietnam	Northern hemisphere	Upper inner arm	55.90	43.59
92	Zaire	Northern hemisphere	Upper inner arm	33.20	37.46
93	Zaire (Konda)	Northern hemisphere	Upper inner arm	29.40	39.43
