= Huacrachuco District =

Coordinates: 8.6067°S 77.1500°W

Huacrachuco
- District
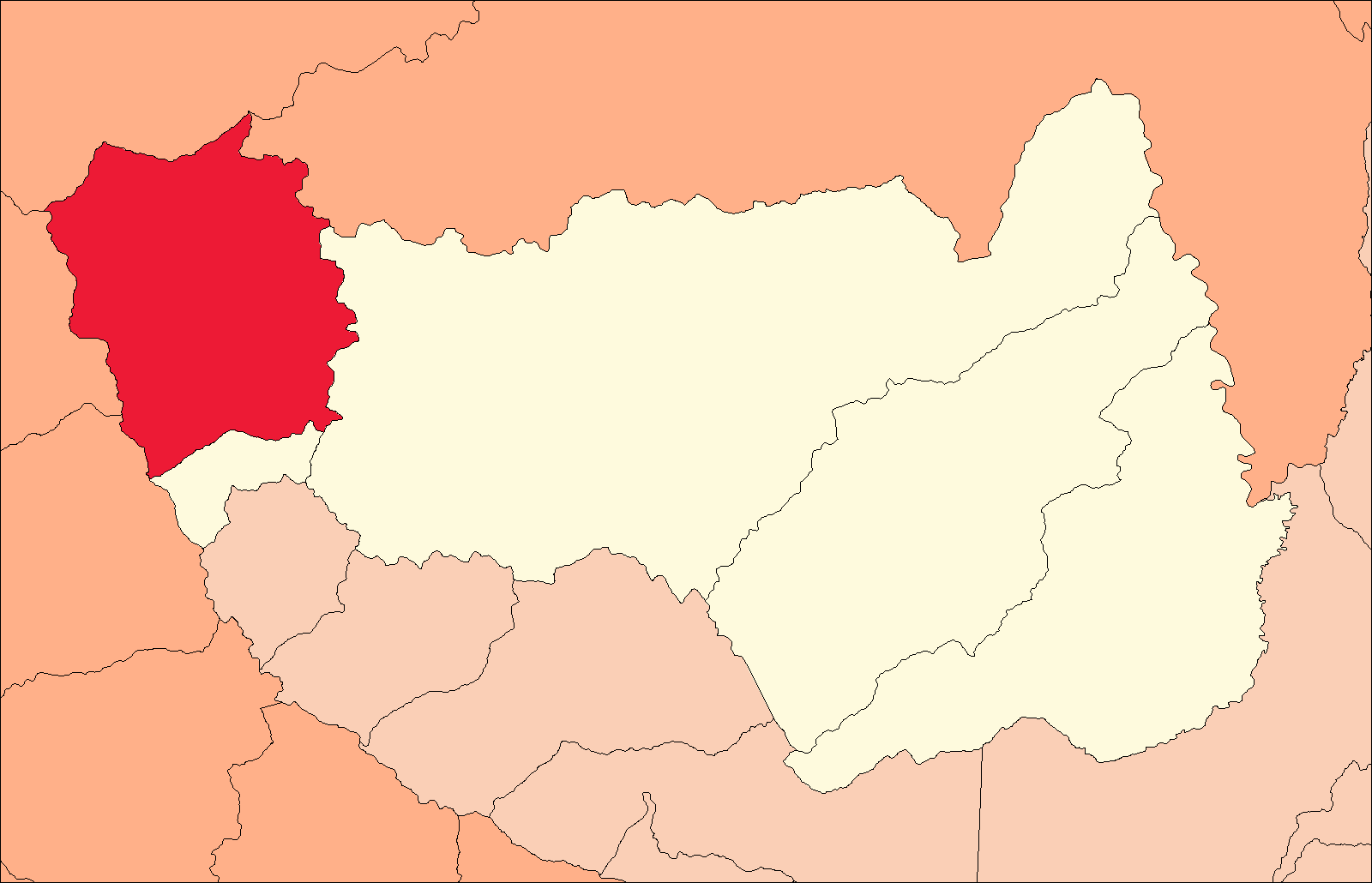
- Location of Huacrachuco in the Marañón province
- Country: Peru
- Region: Huánuco
- Province: Marañón
- Capital: Huacrachuco

Government
  - Mayor: Hipolito Aguirre Vega

Area
  - Total: 704.63 km^{2} (272.06 sq mi)
- Elevation: 2,920 m (9,580 ft)

Population (2005 census)
  - Total: 14,556
  - Density: 20.658/km^{2} (53.503/sq mi)
- Time zone: UTC-5 (PET)
- UBIGEO: 100701

Huacrachuco District is one of three districts of the province Marañón in Peru.
