= Lake Mamacocha (Huánuco) =

Lagoon in Huanuco, Peru

- Location within Peru
- Location: Peru; Huánuco Region
- Coordinates: 8°51′15.01″S 76°54′43.99″W

Lake Mamacocha (Quechua mama mother / madam, qucha lake, mama qucha ocean, Mama Qucha) is a lake in Peru located in the Huánuco Region, Huacaybamba Province, Pinra District. The river Pinra originates in or near the lake. It is an affluent of the Marañón River.
