= Marañón province =

Coordinates: 8.606486°S 77.148247°W

Marañón
- Province
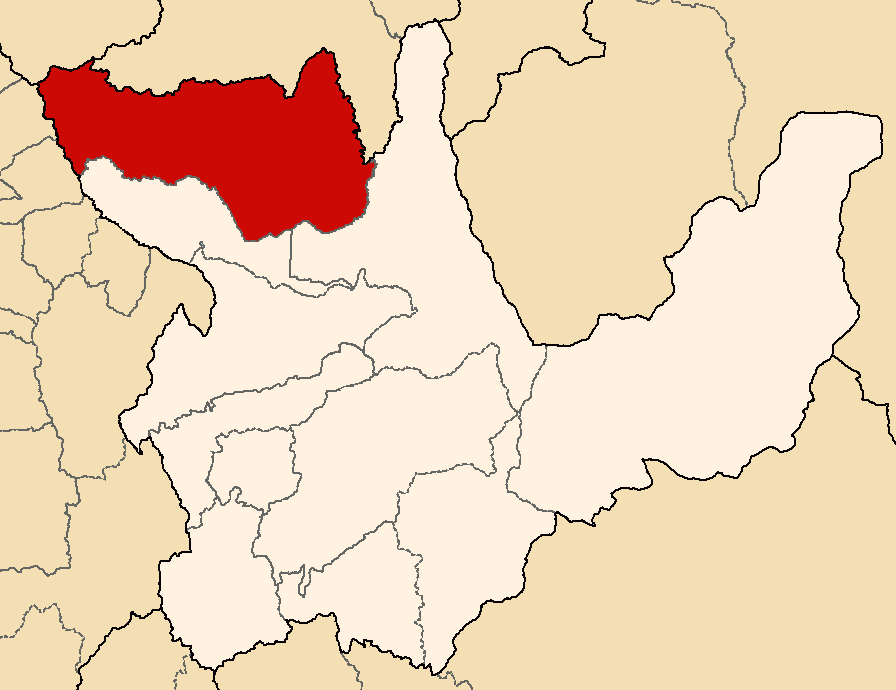
- Location of Marañón in the Huánuco Region
- Country: Peru
- Region: Huánuco
- Capital: Huacrachuco

Government
  - Mayor: Anibal Valverde

Area
  - Total: 4,801.50 km^{2} (1,853.87 sq mi)

Population (2005 census)
  - Total: 24,734
  - Density: 5.1513/km^{2} (13.342/sq mi)
- UBIGEO: 1007

Marañón is one of eleven provinces of the Huánuco Region in Peru. The capital of this province is the city of Huacrachuco. The province has a population of 23,000 inhabitants as of 2002.

== Boundaries ==
- North: La Libertad Region, San Martín Region
- East: province of Leoncio Prado
- South: province of Huacaybamba
- West: Ancash Region

== Political division ==
The province is divided into three districts, which are:

- Cholón (San Pedro de Chonta)
- Huacrachuco (Huacrachuco)
- San Buenaventura (San Buenaventura)

== Ethnic groups ==
The province is inhabited by indigenous citizens of Quechua descent. Spanish is the language which the majority of the population (74.84%) learned to speak in childhood, 24.75% of the residents started speaking using the Quechua language (2007 Peru Census).

== See also ==
- Huánuco Region
- Peru
