= Cholón District =

Coordinates: 8.6065°S 77.1482°W

Cholón
- District
- Interactive map of Cholón
- Country: Peru
- Region: Huánuco
- Province: Marañón
- Founded: October 21, 1912
- Capital: San Pedro de Chonta

Government
  - Mayor: Miguel Herrada Morales

Area
  - Total: 4,010.33 km^{2} (1,548.40 sq mi)
- Elevation: 2,350 m (7,710 ft)

Population (2005 census)
  - Total: 7,993
  - Density: 1.993/km^{2} (5.162/sq mi)
- Time zone: UTC-5 (PET)
- UBIGEO: 100702

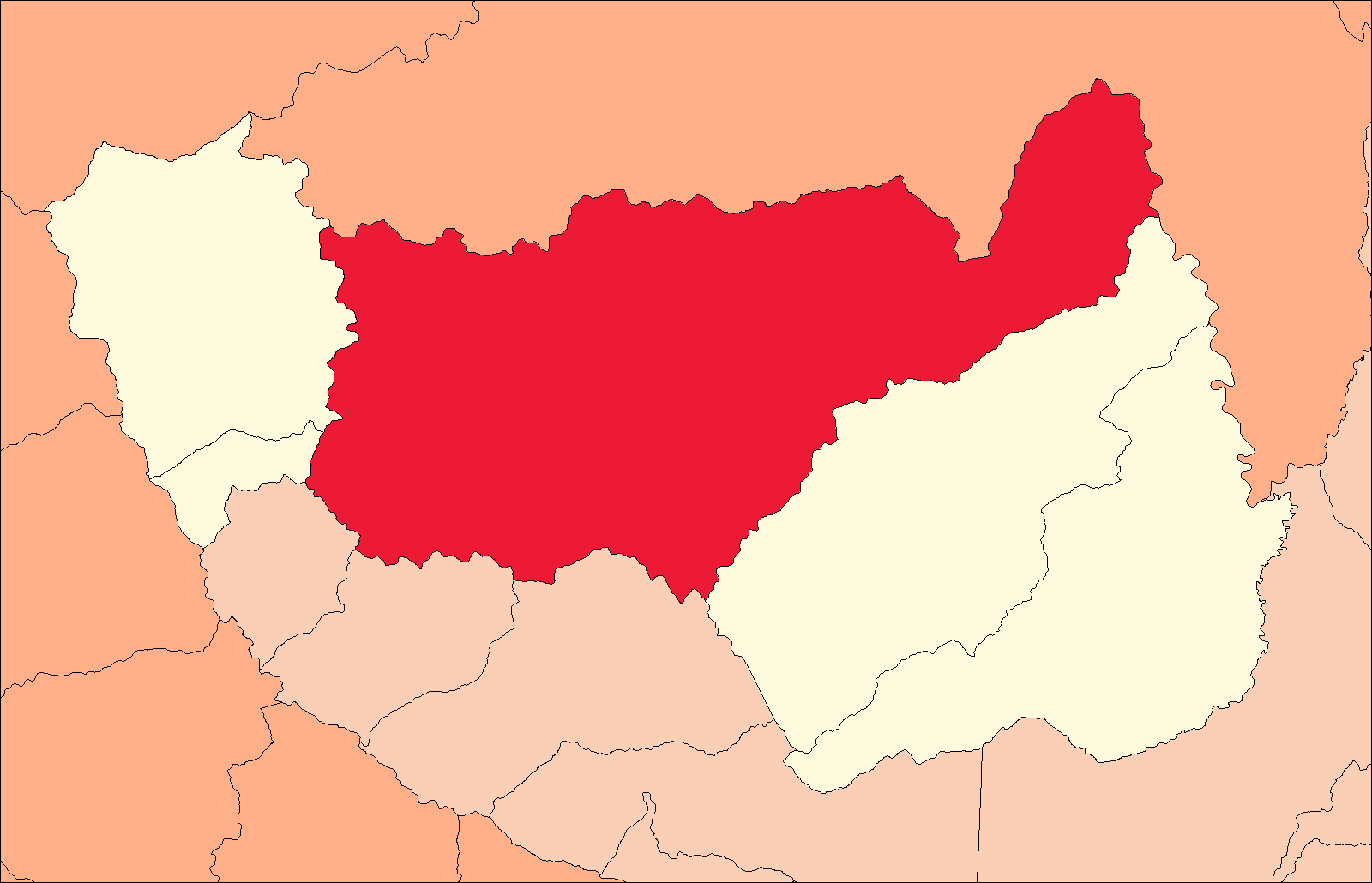
Location of Cholón in Marañón province

Cholón District is one of three districts of the province Marañón in Peru.
