= Huacaybamba province =

Coordinates: 9°04′57″S 76°49′58″W

Huacaybamba
- Province
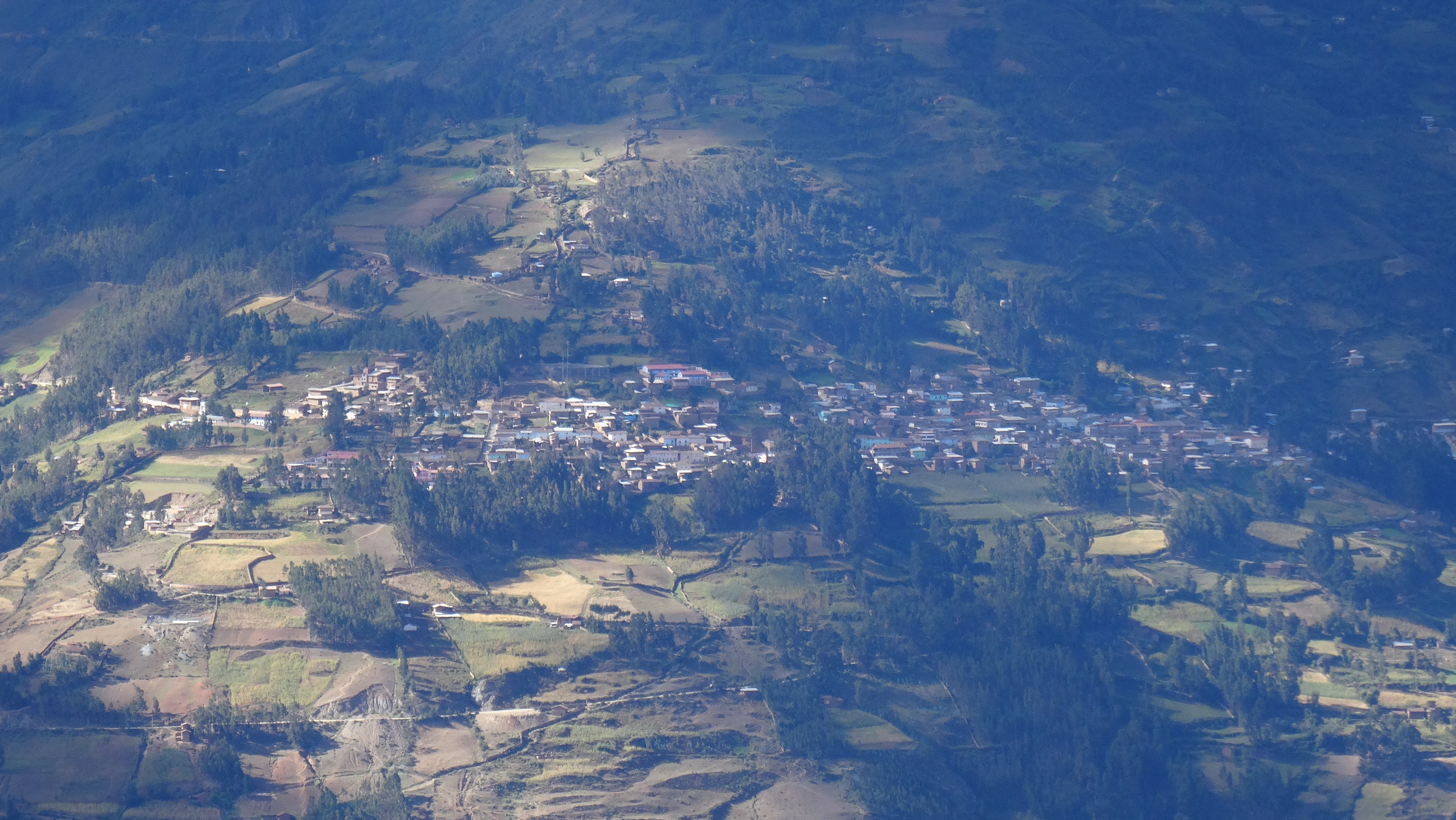
- Aerial view of the city of Huacaybamba

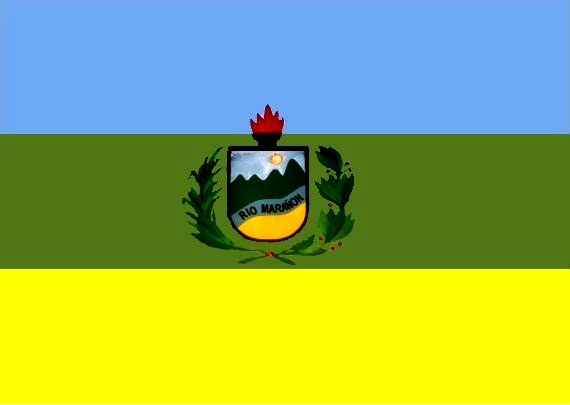
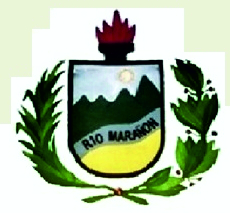
- Flag Coat of arms

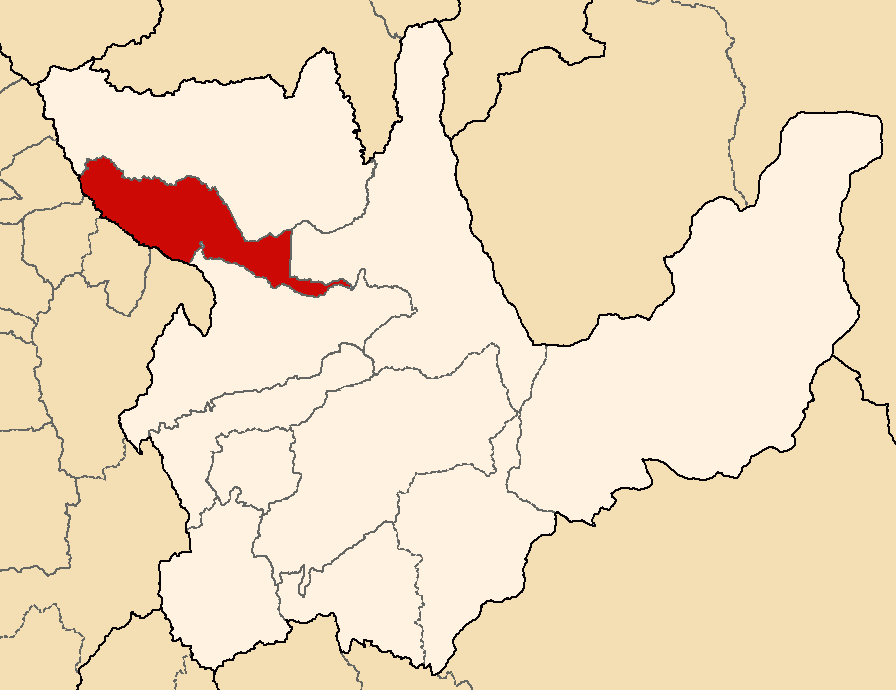
- Location of Huacaybamba in the Huánuco Region
- Country: Peru
- Region: Huánuco
- Capital: Huacaybamba

Area
  - Total: 1,743.70 km^{2} (673.25 sq mi)

Population (2005 census)
  - Total: 19,876
  - Density: 11.399/km^{2} (29.523/sq mi)
- UBIGEO: 1004

Huacaybamba is one of eleven provinces of the Huánuco Region in Peru. The capital of this province is the city of Huacaybamba.

== Boundaries ==
- North: province of Marañón
- East: province of Leoncio Prado
- South: province of Huamalíes
- West: Ancash Region

== Geography ==
One of the highest peaks of the district is Kuntur Marka at approximately 4,400 m (14,400 ft). Other mountains are listed below:

- Chakra Hirka
- Chawpi Marka
- Ch'aki Pilanku
- Hatun Hirka
- Ichik Runtu Pampa
- Kinwa Qucha
- Mata Mata
- Puchkayuq
- Puka Qaqa
- Rima Rima
- Runtu Pampa
- Ruri Qucha
- Saqra
- Tampu
- Tikira Punta
- Uqhu Pampa
- Uqhu Qucha
- Wank'a
- Wask'a Qucha
- Yura K'uchu
- Yura Qucha
- Yuraq Yaku

== Political division ==
The province is divided into four districts, which are:

- Canchabamba
- Cochabamba
- Huacaybamba
- Pinra

== Ethnic groups ==
The people in the province are mainly indigenous citizens of Quechua descent. Quechua is the language which the majority of the population (78.86%) learnt to speak in childhood, 20.45% of the residents started speaking using the Spanish language (2007 Peru Census).

== See also ==
- Kinwaqucha
- Mamaqucha
