= Hatun Hirka (Huacaybamba) =

Mountain in Peru

- Location within Peru

Highest point
- Elevation: 4,200 m (13,800 ft)
- Coordinates: 9°05′07″S 76°51′19″W

Geography
- Location: Huánuco Region
- Parent range: Andes

Hatun Hirka (Quechua hatun big, hirka mountain, "big mountain", also spelled Jatun Jirca) is a 4,200-metre-high (13,800 ft) mountain in the Andes of Peru. It is located in the Huánuco Region, Huacaybamba Province, Cochabamba District.
