= Pinra District =

Coordinates: 8.9134°S 76.8916°W

Pinra
- District
- Interactive map of Pinra
- Country: Peru
- Region: Huánuco
- Province: Huacaybamba
- Founded: January 2, 1857
- Capital: Pinra

Government
  - Mayor: Edgar Briceño Asencios

Area
  - Total: 283.71 km^{2} (109.54 sq mi)
- Elevation: 2,550 m (8,370 ft)

Population (2005 census)
  - Total: 8,272
  - Density: 29.16/km^{2} (75.52/sq mi)
- Time zone: UTC-5 (PET)
- UBIGEO: 100404

Pinra District is one of four districts of the province Huacaybamba in Peru.

== Ethnic groups ==
The people in the district are mainly indigenous citizens of Quechua descent. Quechua is the language which the majority of the population (92.72%) learned to speak in childhood, 6.44% of the residents started speaking using the Spanish language (2007 Peru Census).

== See also ==
- Mamaqucha
