= Huacaybamba =

Huacaybamba Waqaypampa
- Town
- Location within Peru
- Coordinates: 9°02′16″S 76°57′13″W
- Country: Peru
- Region: Huánuco
- Province: Waqaypampa
- District: Waqaypampa
- Time zone: UTC-5 (PET)

Huacaybamba (Quechua: Waqaypampa) is a town in central Peru and the capital of Huacaybamba province in the Department of Huánuco (Quechua: Wanuku).

It was established as the capital of the Huacaybamba province at its formation in 1985.
