= Zara Abid =

Pakistani model and actress (1992–2020)

- Undated Photo
- Born: Zara Abid; 4 April 1992; Lahore, Punjab, Pakistan
- Died: 22 May 2020 (aged 28); Model Colony
- Cause of death: Plane crash
- Occupations: Model, actress
- Modeling information
- Height: 5 ft 8 in (1.73 m)
- Hair color: Black
- Eye color: Green

Zara Abid (Urdu: زارا عابد; 4 April 1992 – 22 May 2020) was a Pakistani model and actress. She was featured in various photo shoots. She made her film debut in Chaudhry – The Martyr, directed by Azeem Sajjad.

She was one of the passengers who died aboard PIA Flight 8303, which crashed in Karachi, Pakistan, on 22 May 2020.

== Modeling career ==
As a fashion icon, she was known for her tall height and tanned complexion, which made her stand out in an industry dominated by lighter-skin models. According to Zara, when she started modeling, she faced discrimination in being hired, allegedly due to her looks and skin colour. However, she stated she worked her way up and received opportunities on the basis of her professional skills and talent. She was described as "stunning and utterly unapologetic" about her complexion. According to a makeup artist who worked with her, Zara embodied the "dusky skin colour" of the majority of Pakistani women, and one of her makeup campaigns became a bestseller because it captured that.

One of her photoshoots by a salon for the magazine Hello Mag in 2019, in which she was styled with a skin tone many shades darker than her own, evoked controversy for allegedly promoting "blackface" and cultural misappropriation, and was perceived by critics as racist. Abid had shared the pictures on her personal Instagram account. The posts were noted to have received backlash and trolling. Abid defended her photoshoot, stating the point was to empower darker-skinned women and send a message about their lack of representation; she also called out the "colourism" that allegedly existed in society, questioning why she was being criticized for adopting a dark profile when in numerous other photoshoots, she had been purposefully presented in lighter tones.

== Film and television ==
Abid began her acting career with her debut role in the upcoming film Chaudhry, directed by Azeem Sajjad and written by Zeeshan Junaid. The film is a biopic about slain police officer Chaudhry Aslam Khan, in which Abid plays a college student. Talking about her role in an interview, Abid said it was very much relatable to her real-life persona, adding that "the character is really strong and I didn’t think twice before saying yes. The script was narrated to me over the phone and I immediately agreed." She began shooting for the film in December 2018. The film is expected to be released in 2020.

On 16 January 2019, she appeared as a guest on the late night television comedy show Mazaaq Raat. On 24 May 2020, her first and only short film Sikka was uploaded to YouTube two days after her death as a tribute. Abid portrays two female characters whose lives are polar opposites in terms of wealth and social status; yet, despite never crossing paths and living very differently, they share similar trials and struggles as women in society. The film does not have dialogue and is narrated in third person by Saba Qamar.

== Death ==
On 22 May 2020, Abid was amongst the passengers of the PIA Flight 8303, which crashed while on final approach for landing near the Jinnah International Airport in Karachi. She was said to be returning to the city after attending her uncle's funeral in Lahore. A flight manifest released by PIA showed her name on the list of passengers. 97 deaths were reported from the 99 people on board, and she was not reported as one of the survivors. She had been modeling for clothing brand Sana Safinaz at the time when she had to reportedly leave for Lahore. Some initial reports claimed she had survived the accident. After the crash, Abid's brother told the media that her family were still looking for her at the hospital where the injured were admitted, and that they were waiting for an update from authorities. Her brother appealed to stop the spread of fake news regarding the matter.

Tributes started to appear on social media as soon as news of the plane accident broke. Many celebrities from the fashion and entertainment industries expressed their condolences when her death was confirmed. Her social media accounts were deactivated by friends and family.

== Awards and nominations ==
In January 2020, Abid won an award in the category of "Best Female Model" at the 4th Hum Style Awards. She was also named in the "Top 100 People" list by Hello! magazine's Pakistan edition.

Ceremony	Category	Result
16th Lux Style Awards	Best Model of the Year (female)	Nominated
17th Lux Style Awards	Best Model of the Year (female)	Nominated
18th Lux Style Awards	Best Model of the Year (female)	Nominated
19th Lux Style Awards	Best Model of the Year (female)	Won
