= DermaSensor =

American medical device company

DermaSensor Inc.
- Type: Private
- Industry: Medical devices
- Founded: 2009
- Founders: Dr. Maurice Ferré, Chris Dewey, Cody Simmons
- Area served: United States; European Economic Area; Australia; New Zealand
- Key people: Dr. Maurice Ferré (chairman); Cody Simmons (CEO)
- Products: DermaSensor skin cancer assessment device
- Website: dermasensor.com

DermaSensor Inc. is a medical device company based in Miami, Florida. Founded in 2009, the company developed DermaSensor, an AI-powered handheld device that uses elastic scattering spectroscopy to assess skin lesions for the risk of skin cancer. The United States Food and Drug Administration (FDA) in January 2024 authorized the device as a Class II device using the De Novo regulatory pathway, making it the first artificial intelligence-enabled medical device authorized by the FDA for assessing skin cancer in primary care. The device can determine whether lesions indicating melanoma, basal cell carcinoma and squamous cell carcinoma require additional examination.

== History ==
DermaSensor was founded in 2009 by Maurice Ferré and Chris Dewey. Cody Simmons joined as chief executive officer in 2016 and is also credited as a co-founder.

The device is based on elastic scattering spectroscopy (ESS), an optical technique developed by Boston University biomedical engineer Irving Bigio. DermaSensor licensed related patents from Bigio and Boston University. Development began around 2011–2012. An early version weighed about 30 lb (14 kg) and was later miniaturized into a handheld device. In 2016, the company held its first pre-submission meeting with the FDA, based on data from an earlier version of the device.

Patient recruitment for the DERM-SUCCESS clinical study started in 2020, which was the year that the company received Series A investment amounting to $11.5 million. The FDA designated the device as a Breakthrough Device in 2021, while in 2022 the company raised another $10 million.

The FDA authorized the marketing of DermaSensor through the De Novo pathway on January 12, 2024. Additional post-market validation using patient populations representative of the U.S. population was also required by the FDA. By that date, around $25 million had been spent on development costs, whereas the firm had raised about $27 million through venture capital.

In October 2025, DermaSensor raised $16 million in a Series B round, bringing its total funding to $43 million. Also, during the same month, the company commenced a product recall for some units of the medical device due to a potential specification problem that could lead to inaccurate results or delayed referrals. The U.S. Food and Drug Administration classified the recall as Class II. Nine out of 343 distributed units were identified as affected.

DermaSensor received a Class IIb CE Mark under the European Union Medical Device Regulation in June 2026. In September 2026, the company raised a further $5 million and reported that the device was being used by hundreds of healthcare provider organizations and had been used to scan more than 45,000 suspicious lesions.

Some of the awards won by the product include the Edison Award and MedTech Breakthrough Award in 2023 and the Health & Biotech category of the SXSW Innovation Awards in 2024. The product was also included in Time magazine's Best Inventions of 2024 list and Inc. magazine's Best in Innovation list in 2025. It was also honored at the TiE50 and Pinnacle Awards in 2026.

== Device ==
DermaSensor is a hand-held instrument in which the fiber-optic tip is placed on the lesion and emits short bursts of light at varying wavelengths. Five sets of readings are obtained at various locations on the lesion within a matter of seconds. Since cancerous and non-cancerous tissues have different cellular and subcellular structures, they also scatter light differently, and the device measures light scattered from underlying structures rather than relying on the appearance of the lesion itself. The spectral data are analyzed using a machine-learning algorithm trained and validated on scans of benign and malignant lesions collected in clinical studies. The output generated by the device is either “Monitor” or “Investigate Further,” and in the case of the latter, a similarity score of 1 to 10 is also provided.

DermaSensor is meant to be used as a support for clinical decision-making rather than as a standalone diagnostic test. The FDA authorization of the product restricts its use to non-dermatologists for the assessment of lesions that may suggest melanoma, basal cell carcinoma, or squamous cell carcinoma in individuals aged 40 years or more.

The DERM-SUCCESS trial enrolled more than 1,000 patients at 22 primary care sites in the United States and Australia. Across 1,579 lesions, the device had an overall sensitivity of 95.5% and specificity of 20.7%; among patients aged 40 or older, sensitivity was 96.3%. Participating primary care physicians had a sensitivity of 83.0% in identifying malignant lesions. The device's sensitivity was broadly similar across skin phototypes; however, 97.1% of participants were White and about 13% had Fitzpatrick skin types V or VI.

With the 2023 clinical utility study, when using the device, the sensitivity for cancer detection among family physicians was increased from 81% to 94% without affecting the specificity. With the 2025 multi-reader test study within the DERM-SUCCESS project, missing cancers decreased from 18.0% to 8.6%, while referral specificity decreased from 44.2% to 32.4%. In a study of lesions that patients themselves found concerning, the device had a sensitivity of 90.0% and specificity of 60.7%; unaided primary care clinicians had lower sensitivity but higher specificity. In the DERM-ASSESS III study of lesions biopsied by dermatologists in a high-risk population, the device detected 95.5% of melanomas, with a specificity of 32.5%. The device has relatively low specificity; hence, it may yield a high number of false-positive results. In that case, the device may refer many people with benign skin lesions to other health professionals. For instance, Nevisense is a similar FDA-approved product with high sensitivity and low specificity levels. However, the trial used skin lesions that had already been selected for biopsy by physicians.

A horizon-scanning report conducted by the Agency for Care Effectiveness in Singapore in 2026 found that DermaSensor had high sensitivity while specificity was either moderate or low. In addition, the report stated that there was limited evidence about how effectively the device could improve diagnosis and decision-making in clinical settings. The report also noted that Asian patients were not adequately represented in the major studies conducted and that DermaSensor had funded the key studies.
