= Von Luschan's chromatic scale =

Method of classifying skin color

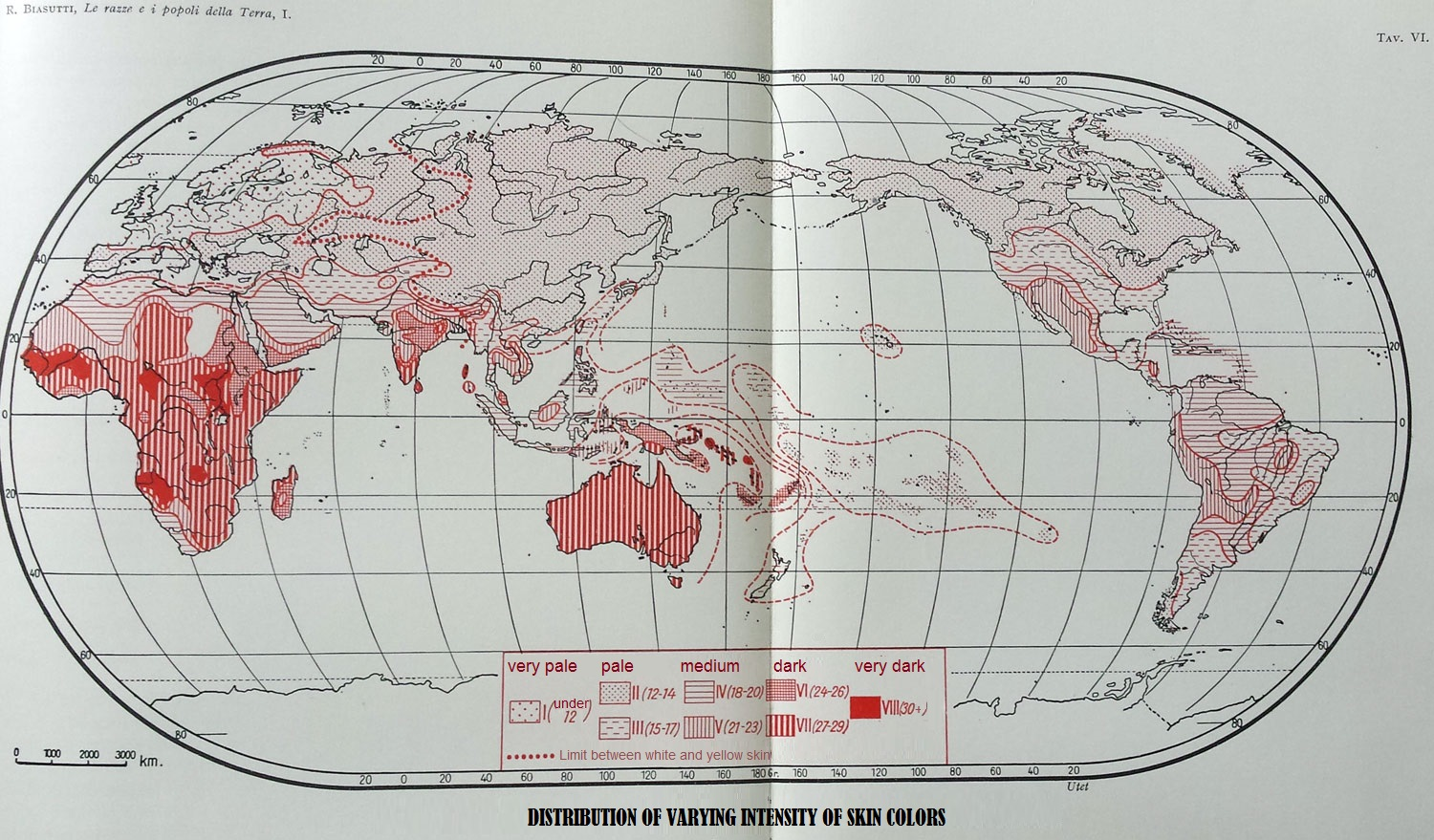
Map of human skin color distribution for native populations, by R. Biasutti in the von Luschan's chromatic scale for classifying skin color. It was reported that for areas with no data Biasutti simply filled in the map by extrapolation from findings obtained in other areas.

Skin colors according to von Luschan's chromatic scale

Von Luschan's chromatic scale (VLS) is a method of classifying skin color. It is also called the von Luschan scale or von Luschan's scale. It is named after its inventor, Felix von Luschan. The equipment consisted of 36 opaque glass tiles which were compared to the subject's skin, ideally in a place which would not be exposed to the sun (such as under the arm). The von Luschan scale was used to establish racial classifications of populations according to skin color; in this respect it is in contrast to the Fitzpatrick scale intended for the classification of the skin type of individuals introduced in 1975 by Harvard dermatologist Thomas B. Fitzpatrick to describe sun tanning behavior.

The von Luschan scale was used extensively throughout the first half of the 20th century in race studies and anthropometry. However, the results were inconsistent: in many instances, different investigators would give different readings of the same person. The von Luschan scale was largely abandoned by the early 1950s, replaced with methods utilizing reflectance spectrophotometry.

The following table shows the 36 categories of the von Luschan scale in relation to the six categories of the Fitzpatrick scale:

Fitzpatrick type	von Luschan scale	Also called
I	1–5	Very light or white, "Celtic" type
II	6–10	Light or light-skinned European
III	11–15	Light intermediate, or dark-skinned European
IV	16–21	Dark intermediate or "olive skin"
V	22–28	Dark or "brown" type
VI	29–36	Very dark or "black" type

== See also ==
- Monk Skin Tone Scale
