= Chaudhry – The Martyr =

Chaudhry - The Martyr
- Directed by: Azeem Sajjad; Neha Laaj
- Written by: Zeeshan Junaid
- Produced by: Neha Laaj
- Starring: Tariq Islam; Shamoon Abbasi; Arbaaz Khan; Adnan Shah Tipu; Jia Ali; Zara Abid; Nawal Saeed
- Music by: Emu
- Production company: Laaj Productions
- Release date: 24 June 2022
- Country: Pakistan
- Language: Urdu

Chaudhry – The Martyr is a 2022 Pakistani biographical action film. The film features Tariq Islam, Shamoon Abbasi, Arbaaz Khan, and Zara Abid in lead roles. The film is based on the life of Chaudhry Aslam Khan and directed by Azeem Sajjad.

It was released after the May 2020 death of Zara Abid, in the PIA Flight 8303 crash that month.

== Cast ==
- Tariq Islam as Chaudhry Aslam Khan
- Shamoon Abbasi
- Arbaaz Khan
- Asfar Mani
- Adnan Shah Tipu
- Nawal Saeed as Zoya
- Zara Abid
- Jia Ali
- Zohaib Khan

== Production ==
In 2019 it was announced that an action movie based on his life will be released, Chaudhry - The Martyr, directed by Azeem Sajjad. Chaudhry's role will be played by his cousin Chaudhry Tariq Islam, who hails from the same villages, is a DSP himself, and worked with Khan for over thirty years; the director acknowledged he had cast him because he's "well versed with [Khan's] body language, gestures, attitude and reflexes."

== Release ==
After multiple delays due to COVID-19 pandemic, it was officially announced that the film would be released on 24 June 2022.
