= Olive skin =

Light tan or brownish human skin tone

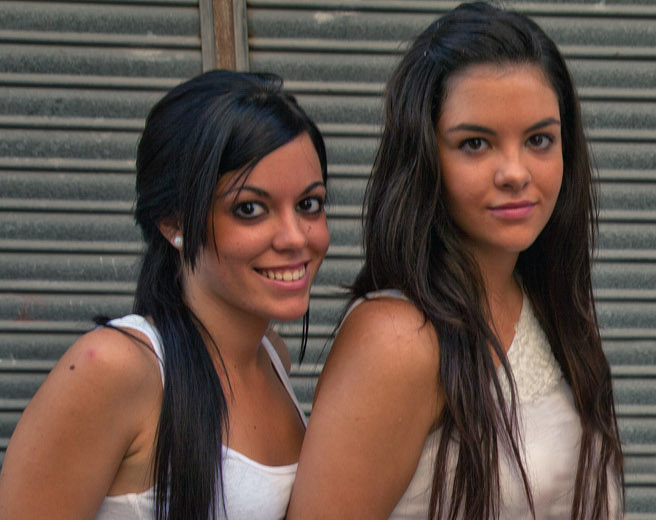
Two olive-skinned women from Orihuela, Spain.

Olive skin is a human skin tone, roughly corresponding to Types III, IV, and V on the Fitzpatrick scale of pigmentation. The term describes lighter brown tones with greenish, yellowish, or golden undertones, such as the light tan.

People with olive skin can sometimes become paler if their sun exposure is limited. However, olive skin still tans more easily than light skin does, and generally still retains notable greenish or yellowish undertones.

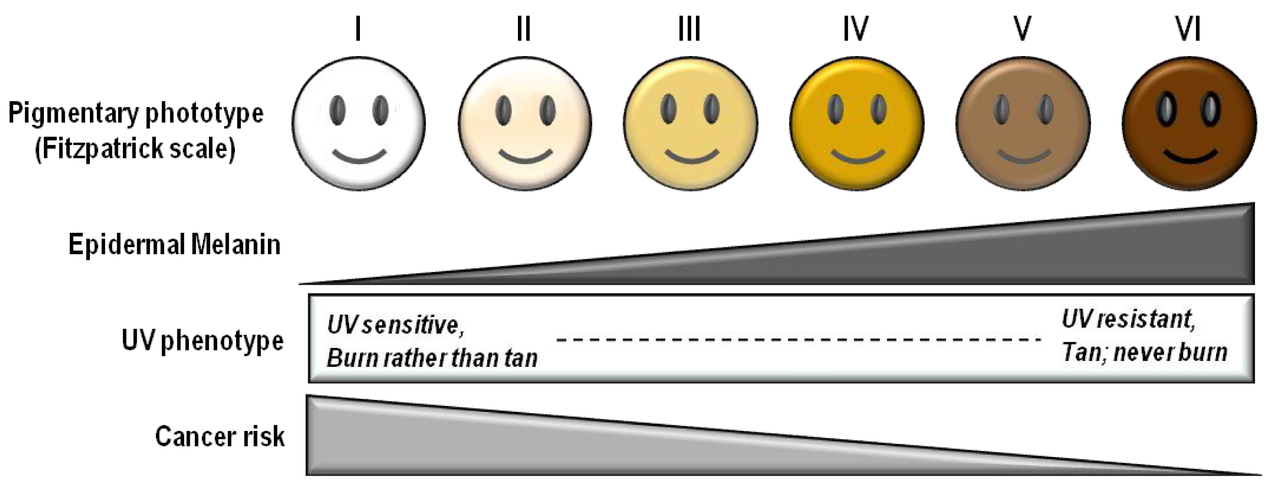
Olive skin covers III, IV and V on the Fitzpatrick scale.

== History ==
A bucket of olives

The Oxford English Dictionary indicates that the term "olive" has been used to describe skin color since at least the 17th century. The earliest recorded instance occurs in the writings of the English traveller Thomas Coryat, who said of the Mughal Emperor Jahangir, "Hee is of complexion neither white nor blacke, but of a middle betwixt the[m]: I know not how to expresse it with a more expressiue & significant ephitheton then Oliue: an Oliue colour his face presenteth[.]"

== Geographic distribution ==
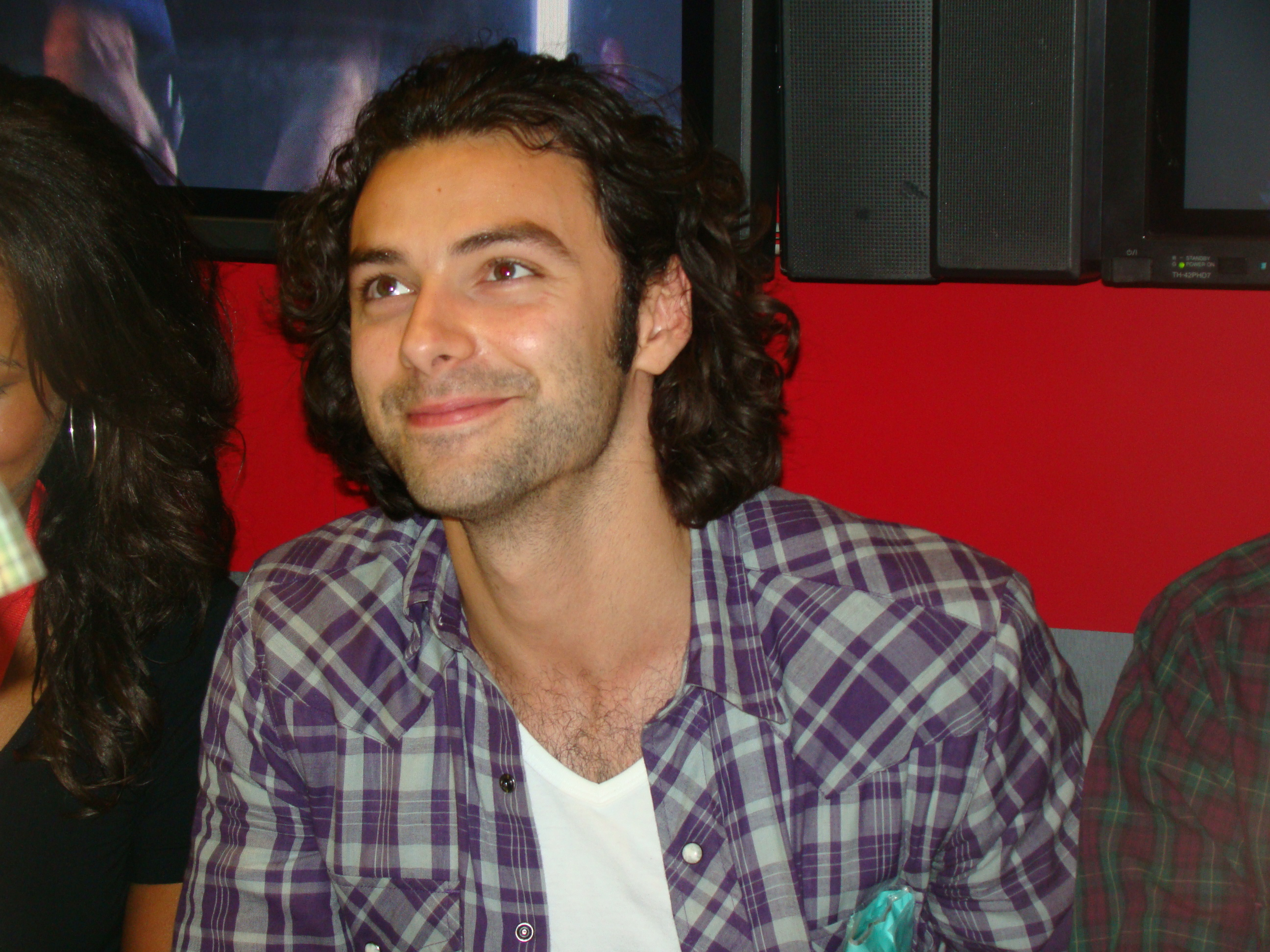
Aidan Turner, an Irish actor with an olive complexion.

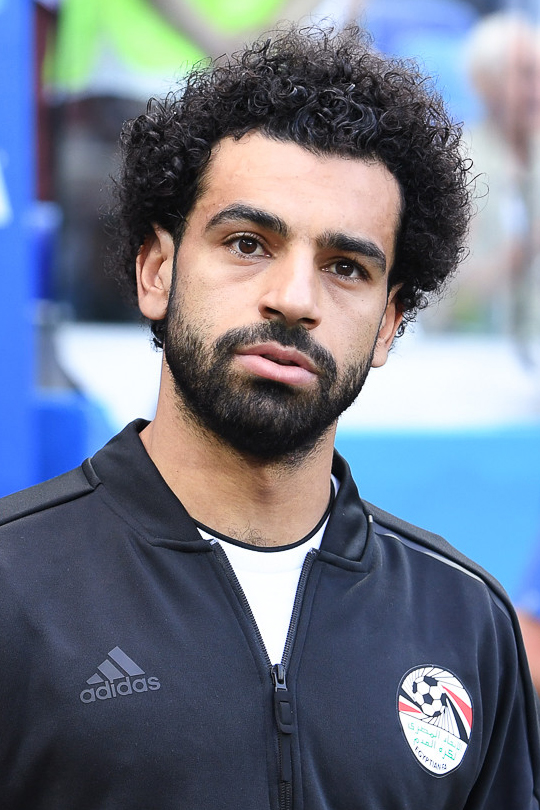
Egyptian footballer Mohamed Salah

Type III pigmentation is frequent among populations from the Mediterranean region, West Asia, South Asia, South Caucasus as well as East Asia, Central Asia, and parts of the Americas. It can also be found sporadically in Northern Europe, giving groups such as the "Black Irish" their distinctive coloration.

Type IV pigmentation occurs in the same regions, as well as South Asia and Austronesia.

Type V pigmentation is found among some populations in Southwest Asia and North Africa. It is frequent in the indigenous peoples of the Americas, in a few parts of Sub-Saharan Africa, and in South Asia.

== See also ==
- Mediterranean race
- Light skin
- Dark skin
