= Felix von Luschan =

Austrian doctor and archaeologist

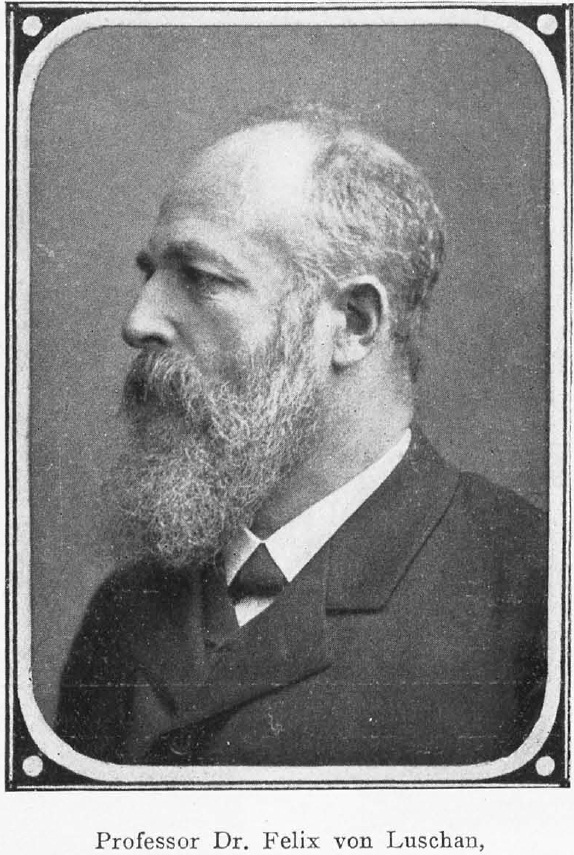
- Felix von Luschan, c. 1907
- Born: August 11, 1854; Oberhollabrunn, Lower Austria, Austrian Empire
- Died: February 7, 1924 (aged 69); Berlin, Weimar Germany
- Education: University of Vienna
- Known for: Von Luschan's chromatic scale
- Scientific career
- Fields: Ethnologist, anthropologist, archaeologist and explorer
- Workplaces: Ethnological Museum of Berlin

Felix Ritter von Luschan (German pronunciation: [ˈfeːlɪks ˈʁɪtɐ fɔn ˈlʊʃan]; 11 August 1854 – 7 February 1924) was a medical doctor, anthropologist, explorer, archaeologist and ethnographer born in the Austrian Empire.

== Life ==
Luschan was born the son of a lawyer in Hollabrunn, Lower Austria, and attended the Akademisches Gymnasium in Vienna. After leaving school he studied medicine at the University of Vienna and anthropology in Paris, with an emphasis on craniometry. After he gained his doctorate in 1878, he was an army doctor in Austro-Hungarian occupied Bosnia and, together with the British archaeologist Arthur Evans, travelled through Dalmatia, Montenegro and Albania. From 1880 he worked as a medical assistant at the Vienna General Hospital and a lecturer (Privatdozent) at the University of Vienna in 1882. In 1885 he married Emma von Hochstetter, daughter of the German geologist Ferdinand von Hochstetter, a close friend of his father.

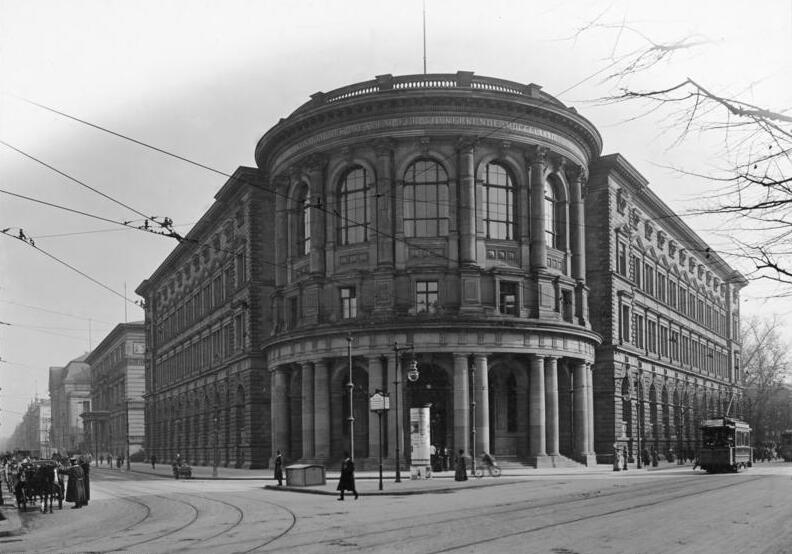
Völkerkundemuseum Berlin, c. 1900

On 1 January 1886 Luschan took up a position as an assistant to Director Adolf Bastian at the Königliches Museum für Völkerkunde in Berlin (the present-day Ethnological Museum), where, upon Bastian's death in 1905, he became Director of the Africa and Oceania Department. In this capacity he acquired one of the most important collections of Benin antiquities, ivory carvings, and bronze figures, details of which he published in his multivolume magnum opus. He also lead a huge collection campaign of the bones and skulls of thousands of people from across European empires. In 1906, this included human remains from the Herero-Nama Genocide.

The skin color chart of Felix von Luschan

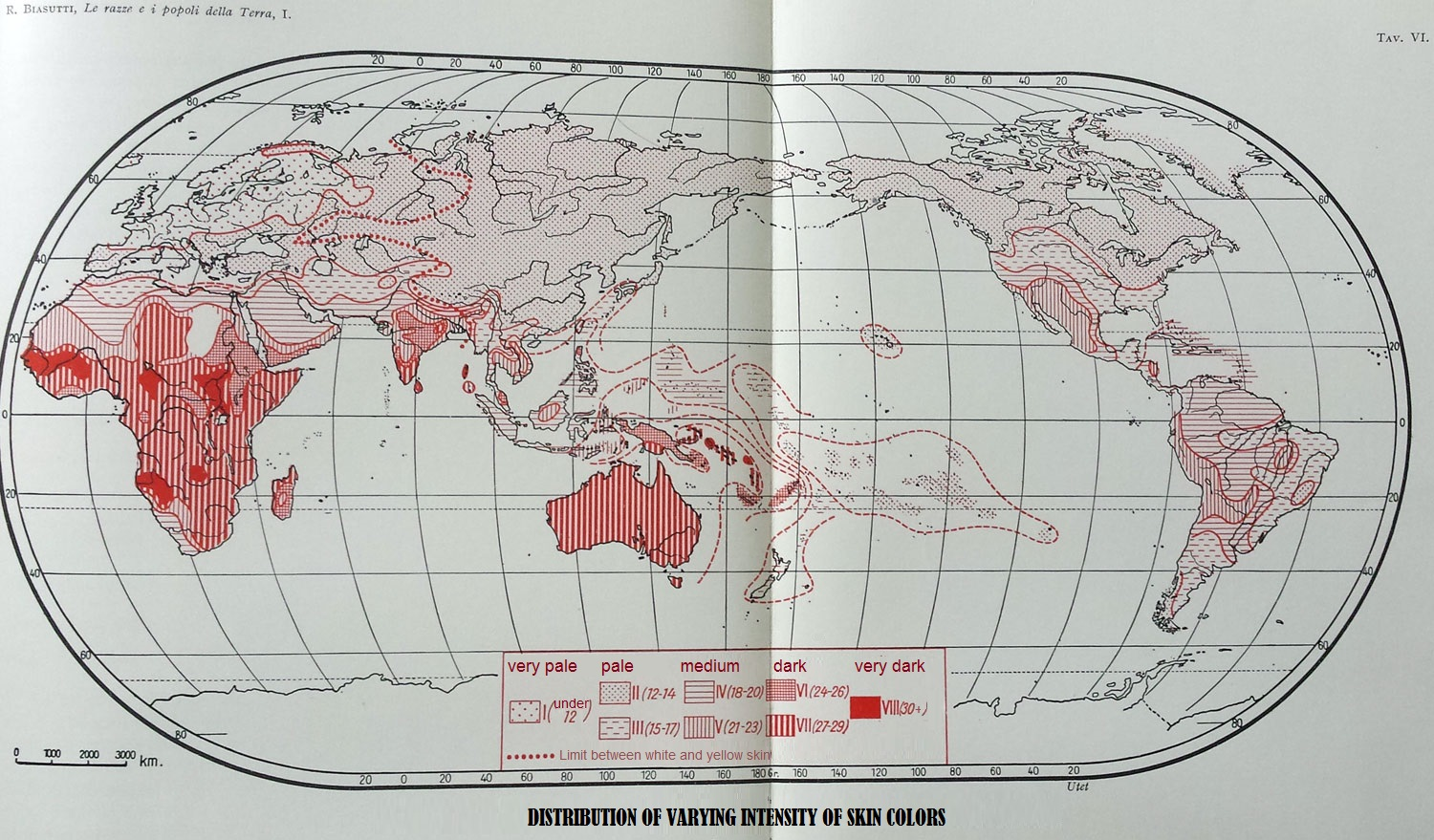
Map of human skin color distribution for native populations, by R. Biassutti in the Von Luschan's chromatic scale for classifying skin color. It was reported that for areas with no data Biasutti simply filled in the map by extrapolation from findings obtained in other areas.

He started his academic career in 1888, in 1904 was appointed Reader, and in 1909 gave up his duties at the Völkerkundemuseum when he was appointed tenured professor at the Berlin Charité medical school. In 1911 he became the holder of the first chair of anthropology at Berlin's Frederick William University (now the Humboldt University of Berlin). He is also remembered for creating the von Luschan's chromatic scale for classifying skin colour, which consisted of 36 opaque glass tiles which were compared to the subject's skin.

Though Luschan had joined the German Society for Racial Hygiene in 1908, in his works he rejected the rising ideas of "scientific racism" and stressed the equality of the human races. He argued for his position in parts on the basis of skulls he instructed German colonial troops to acquire in German colonies, including human remains of victims of the Herero-Nama Genocide. He died in Berlin at the age of 69 and is buried at his summer residence in Millstatt, Austria.

The German Society for Racial Hygiene goal was "for society to return to a healthy and blooming, strong and beautiful life" as Ploetz put it. The Nordic race was supposed to regain its "purity" through selective reproduction and sterilization.

In 1915 he was appointed to the "Königlich Preußische Phonographische Kommission" (Royal Prussian Phonographic Commission) for his anthropological expertise. The purpose of the commission was to record the approximately 250 languages spoken by the prisoners of German WWI PoW camps. In the course of this endeavor, von Luschan also conducted physical anthropology research on the internees.

== Expeditions ==
In 1881 Luschan and Otto Benndorf explored the ancient Lycian region of southern Anatolia, part of the Ottoman Empire, where they excavated the Heroon of Trysa near Myra, which is now on display at the Vienna Kunsthistorisches Museum. The next year he joined Karol Lanckoroński and Alfred Biliotti on an expedition to Pamphylia and Rhodes.

In February 1883 he accompanied Carl Humann on an expedition to Mount Nemrut in historic Commagene which was initiated by the Prussian Academy of Sciences. At Zincirli he discovered the ruins of Sam'al, capital of a small principality of the late Hittite period, which he later excavated between 1888 and 1902 together with Robert Koldewey. Descriptions of the plants he collected in the Ottoman Empire were later published by Otto Stapf.

All his expeditions profited from Luschan's medical training. In 1905 he and his wife Emma travelled to South Africa at the invitation of the British Science Association, and in 1913 they went to Australia, where the couple heard the news of the outbreak of the First World War in Europe and had to proceed to the neutral United States.

== Selected works ==
- Beiträge zur Völkerkunde der deutschen Schutzgebiete (Reimer, Berlin 1897)
- Anthropologie, Ethnographie und Urgeschichte (3rd edition, Jänecke, Hannover 1905)
- Die Altertümer von Benin (1919)
- Völker, Rassen, Sprachen (Deutsche Buch-Gemeinschaft, Berlin 1927)
