= Adan (TV series) =

2023 Pakistani television series

- Written by: Shagufta Bhatti; Ateeq Inayat
- Directed by: Azeem Sajjad
- Starring: Mansha Pasha; Junaid Khan; Azfar Rehman
- Country of origin: Pakistan
- Original language: Urdu
- No. of episodes: 35

Production
- Producers: Wajahat Rauf; Shazia Wajahat
- Camera setup: Multi-camera
- Production company: Showcase Productions

Original release
- Network: Aan TV
- Release: 12 February 2023 – 2023

Adan is a 2023 Pakistani television series produced by Shazia Wajahat under the banner Showcase Productions and directed by Azeem Sajjad. It stars Mansha Pasha, Junaid Khan, and Azfar Rehman in leading roles.

== Plot ==
Zaid and Faraz are friends and the dynamic of their friendship changes when Adan enters Zaid's life. However, after a while Zaid disappears. The story takes a turn when Zaid returns after four years.

== Cast ==
- Mansha Pasha as Adan
- Junaid Khan as Zaid
- Azfar Rehman as Faraz
- Sabiha Hashmi as Zaid's grandmother
- Shehryar Zaidi as Zaid's grandfather
- Amber Wajid as Shahana, Zaid's mother
- Sajid Shah as Zaid's father
- Umer Aalam as Fakhar, Zaid's brother
- Shazia Qaiser as Safia, Adan's mother
- Shehzad Mukhtar as Adan's stepfather
- Eman Zaidi as Tooba, Adan's friend
- Rashid Farooqui as Faraz's father
- Salma Asim as Faraz's mother
- Hina Javed as Mawra, Faraz's first wife
- Irfan Motiwala as Jabbar Malik
- Raja Shahid as Akbar
- Amir Foga as Acchu
- Kashif Rafiq as Jeeda

== Production ==
In July 2022, it reported that Pasha, Khan and Rehman will play the lead roles in Showcase Productions' next TV series. Previously, Sanam Jung was selected to play the female lead but later she was replaced by Pasha, who made her fourth appearance opposite Khan after Dil-e-Beqarar, Madiha Maliha and Zara Aur Mehrunnisa.
