= Health effects of sunlight exposure =

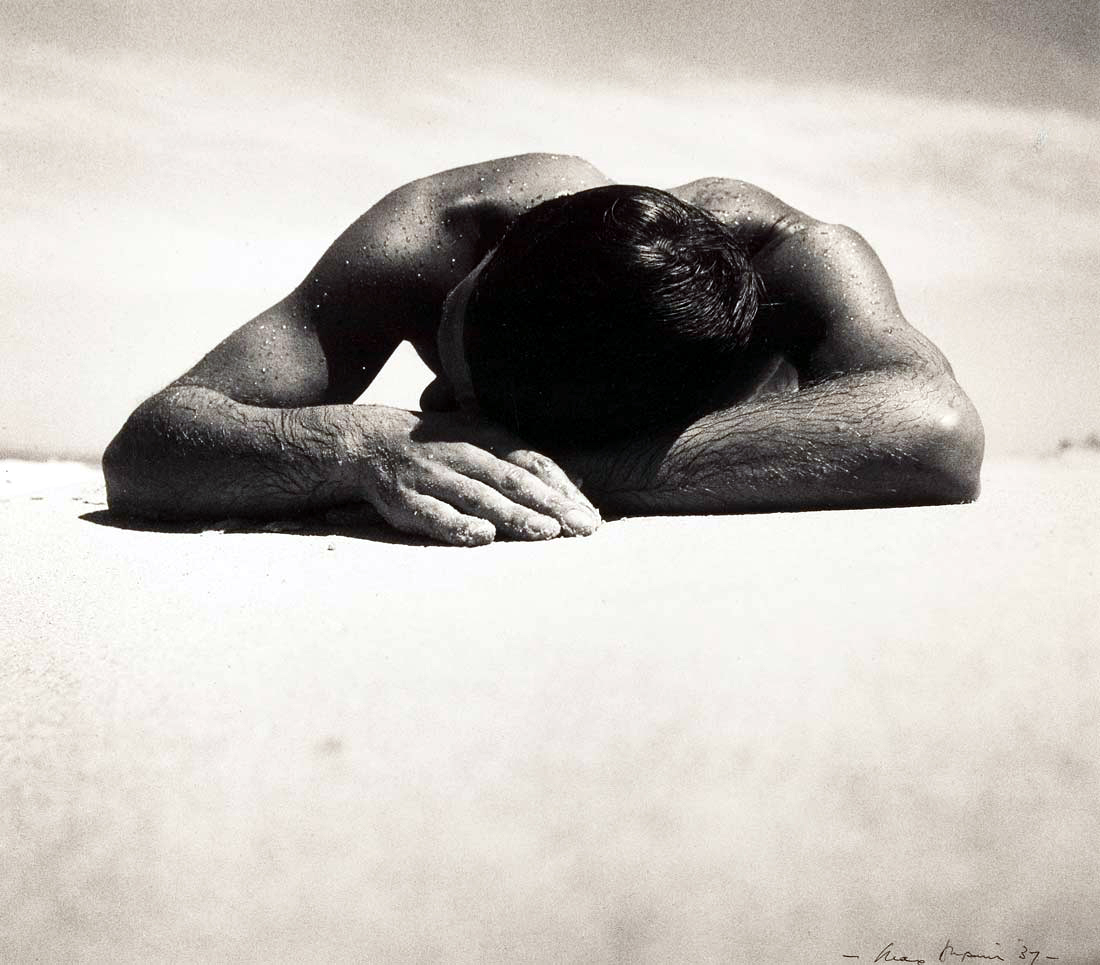
Sunbaker, by Max Dupain

Exposure of skin to ultraviolet radiation from sunlight presents both positive and negative health effects. On the positive side, UV exposure enables the synthesis of vitamin D_{3}, which is essential for bone health and potentially plays a role in inhibiting certain cancers. While vitamin D can also be obtained through dietary supplements, UV exposure offers benefits such as enhanced subdermal nitric oxide production and improved endorphin levels, which are not achievable through supplementation alone. Additionally, exposure to visible light supports melatonin synthesis, maintains circadian rhythms, improves cognitive function, including motor learning capabilities, enhanced object recognition memory, and strengthened synaptic plasticity, and reduces the risk of seasonal affective disorder.

However, UV radiation is also a mutagen and carcinogen for the skin, posing significant risks. Acute exposure can lead to painful sunburns and increase the likelihood of developing serious skin conditions later in life. Prolonged exposure is associated with the development of skin cancers, photoaging or premature skin aging, immune suppression, and eye diseases like cataracts.

Given these dual effects, public health organizations emphasize the importance of striking a balance between the benefits and risks of UV exposure. They recommend avoiding sunburn at all costs and advocate for moderation in sun exposure to minimize the risks associated with UV radiation while still reaping its health benefits. That being said, experts encourage avoiding sun exposure between the hours of 10 a.m. to 4 p.m. since this can reduce skin cancer, skin damage, and premature aging.

== Vitamin D_{3} production ==
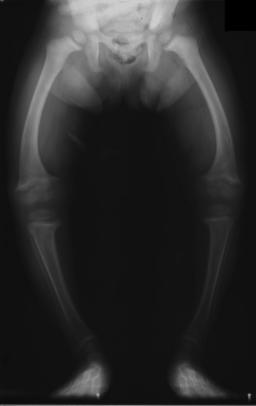
Radiograph of a child with rickets, usually caused by insufficient vitamin D

UVB radiation with a wavelength of 290–315 nanometers penetrates uncovered skin and converts cutaneous 7-dehydrocholesterol to previtamin D_{3}, which in turn becomes vitamin D_{3}. UVB radiation does not penetrate glass, so exposure to sunshine indoors through a window does not produce vitamin D. Time of day, time of year, geographic latitude, ground altitude, cloud cover, smog, skin melanin content, and sunscreen are among the factors that greatly affect UV intensity and vitamin D synthesis, making it difficult to provide general guidelines. It has been suggested by some researchers, for example, that adequate amounts of vitamin D can be produced with moderate sun exposure to the face, arms and legs, averaging 5–30 minutes twice per week without sunscreen. (The darker the complexion, or the weaker the sunlight, the more minutes of exposure are needed, approximating 25% of the time for minimal sunburn. Vitamin D overdose is impossible from UV exposure; the skin reaches an equilibrium where the vitamin degrades as fast as it is created.) Individuals with limited sun exposure need to include good sources of vitamin D in their diet or take a supplement.

The only way to quantify adequate levels of vitamin D is with a serum 25(OH)D_{3} (calcifediol) test. In the United States, serum 25(OH)D_{3} was below the recommended level for more than a third of white men in a 2005 study, with serum levels even lower in women and in most minorities. This indicates that vitamin D deficiency may be a common problem in the US. Australia and New Zealand have had similar findings, which indicate insufficient protection against rickets for children and osteoporosis for adults.

Over the past several years, levels of ultraviolet radiation have been tracked at over 30 sites across North America as part of the United States Department of Agriculture's UVB Monitoring and Research Program at Colorado State University. The first map at right shows levels of UVB radiation in June 2008, expressed in Vitamin D Equivalents.

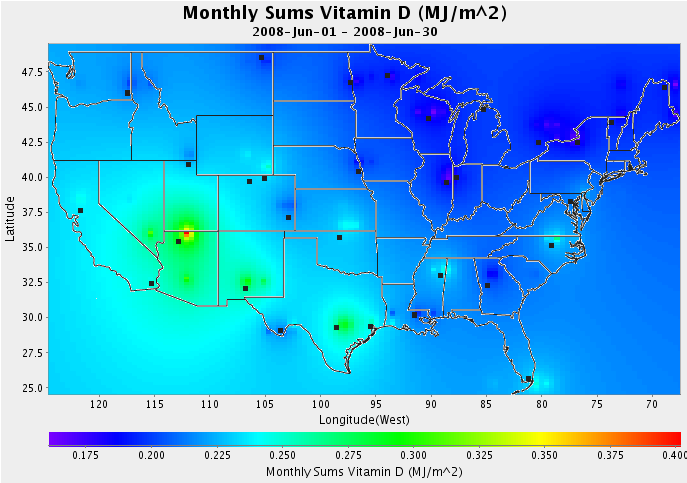
UV map (Vitamin D equivalents)

Using satellite data, measurements from the European Space Agency produce similar maps expressed in units of the widely followed UV Index, for locations around the world. Effects of UV-radiation at high latitudes, where snow stays on the ground into early summer and the sun then remains at a low position even at its zenith, have been reviewed by Meyer-Rochow.

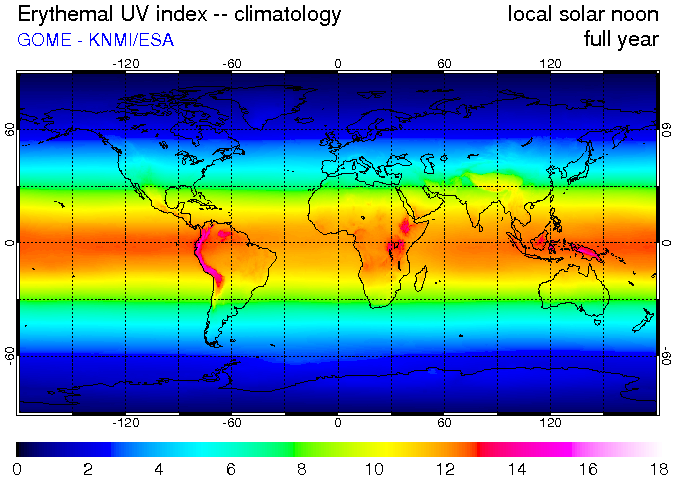
UV map (UV index)

Exposure to ultraviolet radiation from the sun is a source of vitamin D. One minimal erythemal dose of sunlight UV radiation provides the equivalent of about 20,000 IU of vitamin D2, taken as an oral supplement. If an adult's arms and legs are exposed to a half minimal erythemal UV radiation, it is the same as taking 3,000 IU of vitamin D_{3} through an oral supplement. This exposure of 10–15 minutes, on a frequency of two to three times per week, will cause the adult's skin to produce enough vitamin D. It is not necessary to expose the face to the UV, as facial skin provides little vitamin D_{3}. Individuals whose metabolism makes taking oral vitamin D ineffective are able, through exposure to an ultraviolet lamp that emits UV-B radiation, to achieve a 25 (OH) D blood level.

Three benefits of UV exposure are production of vitamin D, improvement in mood, and increased energy.

UVB induces production of vitamin D in the skin at rates of up to 1,000 IUs per minute. This vitamin helps to regulate calcium metabolism (vital for the nervous system and bone health), immunity, cell proliferation, insulin secretion, and blood pressure. In low and middle income countries, foods fortified with vitamin D are "practically nonexistent." Most people in the world depend on the sun to get vitamin D, and elderly populations in low UVB countries experience higher rates of cancer.

There are not many foods that naturally have vitamin D. Examples are cod liver oil and oily fish. If people cannot get sunlight, then they will need 1,000 IU of vitamin D per day to stay healthy. A person would have to eat oily fish three or four times per week in order to get enough vitamin D from that food source alone.

People with higher levels of vitamin D tend to have lower rates of diabetes, heart disease, and stroke and tend to have lower blood pressure. However, it has been found that vitamin D supplementation does not improve cardiovascular health or metabolism, so the link with vitamin D must be in part indirect. People who get more sun are generally healthier, and also have higher vitamin D levels. It has been found that ultraviolet radiation (even UVA) produces nitric oxide (NO) in the skin, and nitric oxide can lower blood pressure. High blood pressure increases the risk of stroke and heart disease. Although long-term exposure to ultraviolet contributes to non-melanoma skin cancers that are rarely fatal, it has been found in a Danish study that those who get these cancers were less likely to die during the study, and were much less likely to have a heart attack, than those who did not have these cancers.

People in certain situations, such as people with intellectual disabilities and neurodevelopmental disorders who stay inside most of the time have low vitamin D levels. Getting enough vitamin D can help stave off "autoimmune diseases, cardiovascular disease, many types of cancer, dementia, types 1 and 2 diabetes mellitus, and respiratory tract infections."

Fetuses and children who do not get enough vitamin D can result in "growth retardation and skeletal deformities."

=== Multiple sclerosis risk ===
Multiple sclerosis (MS) is least prevalent in the sunniest regions. According to a study published in 2025, "Sunlight exposure was shown to have a strong protective impact against [Late Onset] MS." Exposure to the ultraviolet-B radiation of sunlight appears to be most important and this may operate via vitamin D synthesis.

== Effects on skin ==
Melanoma on human skin

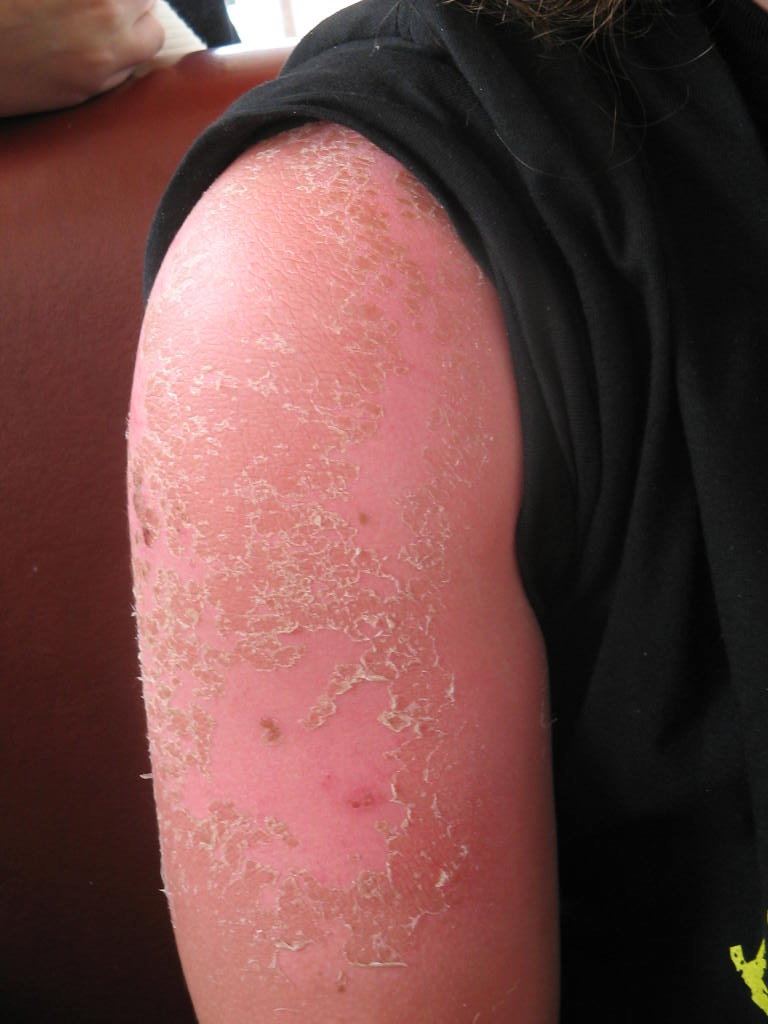
Sunburn peeling

Ultraviolet (UV) irradiation present in sunlight is an environmental human carcinogen. The toxic effects of UV from natural sunlight and therapeutic artificial lamps are a major concern for human health. Skin surface lipids, including unsaturated lipids such as squalene, sebaleic acid, linoleic acid, and cholesterol can be a subject of oxidation by singlet oxygen and ozone as well as free radicals. Ultraviolet radiation activates lipoxygenase and cyclooxygenase, inducing specific enzymatic oxidation of lipids. Free radical mediated lipid peroxidation gives multiple oxidation products which may induce various skin diseases.

UVB damages mRNA. This triggers a fast pathway that leads to inflammation of the skin and sunburn. mRNA damage initially triggers a response in ribosomes though a protein known as ZAK-alpha in a ribotoxic stress response. This response acts as a cell surveillance system. Following this detection of RNA damage leads to inflammatory signaling and recruitment of immune cells. This, not DNA damage (which is slower to detect), results in UVB skin inflammation and acute sunburn.

The major acute effects of UV irradiation on normal human skin comprise sunburn inflammation erythema, tanning, and local or systemic immunosuppression. The most deadly form, melanoma, is mostly caused by indirect DNA damage from UVA radiation. This can be seen from the absence of a direct UV signature mutation in 92% of all melanoma. UVC is the highest-energy, most-dangerous type of ultraviolet radiation, and causes adverse effects that can variously be mutagenic or carcinogenic.

Despite the importance of the sun to vitamin D synthesis, it is prudent to limit the exposure of skin to UV radiation from sunlight and from tanning beds. According to the National Toxicology Program Report on Carcinogens from the US Department of Health and Human Services, broad-spectrum UV radiation is a carcinogen whose DNA damage is thought to contribute to most of the estimated 1.5 million skin cancers and the 8,000 deaths due to metastatic melanoma that occur annually in the United States. The use of sunbeds is reported by the World Health Organization to be responsible for over 450,000 cases of non-melanoma skin cancer and over 10,000 cases of melanoma every year in the U.S., Europe, as well as Australia. Lifetime cumulative UV exposure to skin is also responsible for significant age-associated dryness, wrinkling, elastin and collagen damage, freckling, IGH, age spots and other cosmetic changes. UVA, which is roughly 20 times more abundant than UVB at ground level and penetrates deeper into the dermis, is thought to deliver most of the dose responsible for this damage, generating reactive oxygen species that increase matrix metalloproteinase activity and break down collagen. The American Academy of Dermatology advises that photoprotective measures be taken, including the use of sunscreen, whenever one is exposed to the sun. Short-term over-exposure causes the pain and itching of sunburn, which in extreme cases can produce more-severe effects like blistering.

Several countries (such as Australia) provide public forecasts of UV irradiation in the form of the UV Index. The index can be used as a guide to the public of dangers from over-exposure to sunlight, especially around noon, when direct sunlight is at its most intense.

== Effects on eyes ==
Prolonged optical exposure to sunlight, especially intense ultraviolet light, may be linked to cortical cataracts, and high levels of visible light is maybe linked to macular degeneration.

However, significant daily exposure to bright light may be necessary for children to avoid myopia (nearsightedness).

Short-term over-exposure can cause snow blindness, which is analogous to sunburn of the cornea, or can cause solar retinopathy, which is long-lasting retinal damage and vision impairment from sungazing.

Exposure of the eyes to long wavelength light (670nm) improved color contrasts sensitivity.

Frequent exposure to the sun can cause yellow non-cancerous bumps on the middle part of the sclera of the eye, called pingueculae. It is most common in younger people, mainly those who spend a lot of their time outdoors and do not protect their eyes from UV rays. To decrease the risk of developing pingueculae, it may be wise to wear sunglasses when outdoors, even on overcast days.

== Circadian rhythm ==
Light to the eyes, primarily blue-wavelength light, is important for the entrainment and maintenance of robust circadian rhythms. Exposure to sunlight in the morning is particularly effective; it leads to earlier melatonin onset in the evening and makes it easier to fall asleep. Natural daylight exposure, particularly at high intensities, has been shown to have numerous beneficial effects on sleep patterns. It can advance sleep timing (leading to earlier bedtimes), affect sleep duration, and improve overall sleep quality. Bright morning light has been shown to be effective against insomnia, premenstrual syndrome and seasonal affective disorder (SAD).

== Near-infrared light ==
Research suggests that near-infrared (NIR) light from the Sun (approximately 700 nm to 3000 nm) has biological effects on human health. Within cells, mitochondria convert glucose, fats, and proteins into energy. This process generates intense heat in the form of oxidative stress. If unmitigated this can lead to mitochondrial dysfunction and chronic diseases.

Melatonin is also synthesized directly within mitochondria and functions as an antioxidant. The presence of mitochondrial melatonin can help protect it from oxidative damage, supporting efficient energy production.

Studies indicate that NIR light from sunlight can pass through the human body and stimulate the production of mitochondrial melatonin. Although NIR light is outside the visible spectrum, it may act as a vital signaling mechanism for antioxidant production.

== Folate degradation ==
Blood levels of folate, a nutrient vital for fetal development, can be degraded by UV radiation, raising concerns about sun exposure for pregnant women. Lifespan and fertility can be adversely affected for individuals born during peaks of the 11-year solar cycle, possibly because of UV-related folate deficiency during gestation.

== Blood pressure ==
A seasonal variation in blood pressure has been noted for decades. Research indicates that skin exposure to sunlight results in a modest reduction in systolic blood pressure. The effect is independent of vitamin D status, instead being mediated by nitric oxide release from skin upon exposure to UV light. The effect is greater in fair-skinned individuals.

== Cognitive functioning and mood ==
UV exposure plays a role in motor learning and object recognition memory. Moderate UV exposure enhances cognitive functioning through a specialized glutamate (GLU) biosynthetic pathway in the brain. The process begins when UV exposure triggers an increase in blood levels of urocanic acid (UCA), which possesses the unique ability to cross the blood-brain barrier. Upon entering the brain, UCA initiates a cascade of biochemical reactions that promote glutamate biosynthesis, particularly in critical regions such as the motor cortex and hippocampus. This increased glutamate production leads to notable cognitive enhancements, including improved motor learning capabilities, enhanced object recognition memory, and strengthened synaptic plasticity.

Ultraviolet (UV) light has been shown to influence various neurological functions, including mood, addiction, cognition, and memory. This impact likely occurs through UV-induced changes in brain chemistry, potentially altering neurotransmitter systems and neuroplasticity. UV exposure might, for example, affect serotonin levels, which play a significant role in mood regulation and cognitive functions. This hormonal effect can helps stabilize circadian rhythms. This stabilizing effect is particularly important for individuals with mental disorders, who often experience circadian desynchronization and sleep problems. As a result, light therapy has emerged as an increasingly popular treatment option for various mood and psychiatric disorders.

== Safe level of sun exposure ==
According to a 2007 study submitted by the University of Ottawa to the US Department of Health and Human Services, there is not enough information to determine a safe level of sun exposure that imposes minimal risk of skin cancer. In addition, there is not yet conclusive evidence on which components of ultraviolet radiation (UVA, UVB, UVC) are actually carcinogenic. UVC is almost completely absorbed by the atmosphere and does not reach the surface in any appreciable quantity. As a result, only the broad-spectrum combination (UVA, UVB, UVC) known as "ultraviolet radiation" is listed as a carcinogen; the components are only "likely to become" known carcinogens. Solar radiation (sunlight) and sunlamps are listed as carcinogens because they contain ultraviolet radiation.

=== Lifetime sun exposure ===
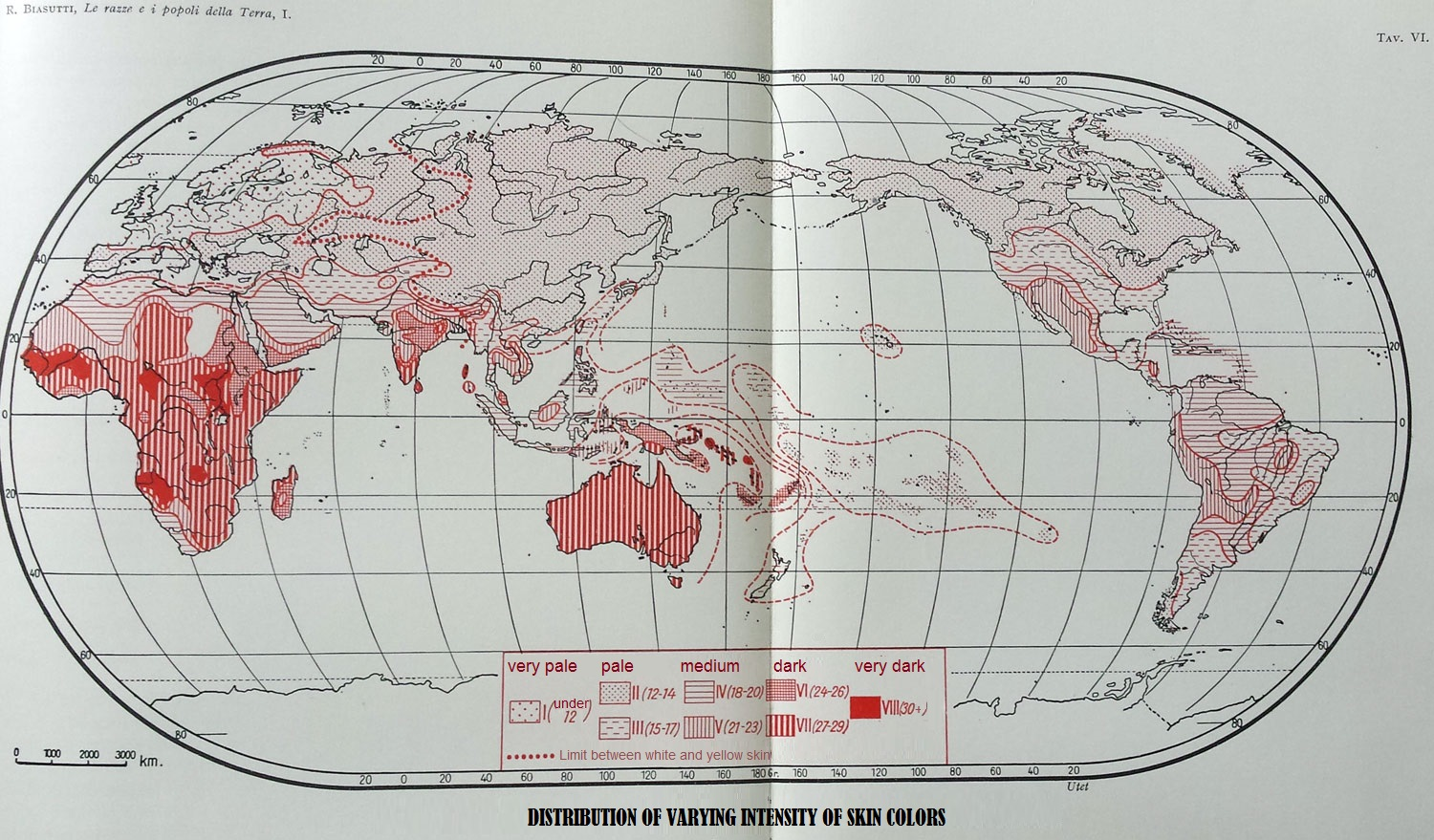
Map of human skin color distribution for native populations, by R. Biassutti in Von Luschan's chromatic scale for classifying skin color. It was reported that for areas with no data Biasutti simply filled in the map by extrapolation from findings obtained in other areas.

In 2007, there were no recommendations on a safe level of total lifetime sun exposure. According to epidemiologist Robyn Lucas at Australian National University, analysis of lifespan versus disease shows that far more lives worldwide could be lost to diseases caused by lack of sunlight than to those caused by too much, and it is inappropriate to recommend total avoidance of sunlight.

Over thousands of years, in many climate zones, genetic selection has helped indigenous human populations adapt toward skin pigmentation levels that provide a healthy level of UV exposure. This largely explains the tendency toward darker-skinned populations in the sunniest tropical environments, and lighter skin tones in less-sunny regions and for those who most need vitamin D for rapid bone growth, specifically children and reproductive-age women. The map illustrates the geographic distribution of skin color for native populations prior to 1940, based on von Luschan's chromatic scale. These long-term adaptations for optimal health can be confounded by patterns of food, clothing and shelter, especially at a time when large populations have migrated far from the climates for which their skin was genetically adapted.

== See also ==
- Sunburn
- Fluorescent lamps and health
- Heat stroke
- Photosensitivity in humans
- UV Index
- High-energy visible light
