= Faseel-e-Jaan Se Aagay =

- Title screen
- Written by: Syed Nadeem
- Directed by: Syed Mujtaba Tirmizi; Azeem Sajjad
- Country of origin: Pakistan

Production
- Producer: Khawar Azhar

Original release
- Release: 2010 – 10 June 2011

Faseel-e-Jaan Se Aagay (meaning: Beyond the Call of Duty) is an action series directed by Brig Syed Mujtaba Tirmizi and Azeem Sajjad on behalf of the Pakistani armed forces for the state television broadcaster PTV. The executive producer of the drama series is Khawar Azhar, whereas the writer is Asghar Nadeem Syed. This project was made by Inter Services Public Relations - ISPR in cooperation with CRS. Season 2 of the drama series was released on 10 June 2011.

== Plot ==
The series is about 22 Pakistani soldiers who fought terrorists of the Tehrik-i-Taliban Pakistan in the country's Federally Administered Tribal Areas on the Pakistan-Afghanistan border. The plot is set in 2009. All of the episodes are based on true events.

== Cast ==
- Saba Qamar as Neelofar
- Erum Akhtar as Maria
- Seemi Raheel as Ammi

== Production ==
Two seasons have been produced so far (as of September 2011).

Each episode costed about $12,000. The main characters are played by soldiers of the Pakistani Armed Forces who do not receive any extra payments. Real war equipment was used.
