= 8969 =

- Directed by: Azeem Sajjad
- Written by: Azeem Sajjad
- Based on: True Events
- Produced by: AJ Khan
- Starring: Saba Qamar; Hussain Tiwana; Azeem Sajjad; Sadaf Hamid; Anum Malik; Ali Jabran Khan
- Cinematography: Sabahat Qamar
- Edited by: Salman Khan
- Music by: Raheel Fayyaz
- Production company: A J Media Productions
- Distributed by: Play Pictures
- Release date: 2 December 2016 (Pakistan)
- Running time: 147mins
- Country: Pakistan
- Language: Urdu
- Box office: Rs 6 Million

8969 is a 2016 Pakistani thriller film directed by Azeem Sajjad. The film stars Saba Qamar, and introduced new stars namely Hussain Tiwana, Sadaf Hamid, Anam Goher and Ali Jabran Khan in lead roles. It was released on 2 December 2016 under the production banner of A J Media Productions.

== Plot ==
The movie appears to be a murder mystery; along with a serial killer's trivia twist to the story.

== Cast ==
- Saba Qamar as Zara Nawazish
- Hussain Tiwana as Aman
- Sadaf Hamid as Maheen
- Azeem Sajjad as Shahzaib
- Anam Malik as Sheela
- Anam Goher
- Haseeb Khan as Boss
- Sama Shah as Maria
- Zunaira Maham as Seema
- Noor ul Hassan as DSP Nawazish
- Oun Sarwar as Detective Oun
- Ali Jabran Khan as Daniyal

== Music ==
The music for the film has been composed by Raheel Fayyaz.

== Release ==
The trailer of 8969 was released in September 2014. The film was set to be released in April 2016 but was pushed to late 2016. The film was released in Pakistan nationwide on 2 December 2016.

== See also ==
- List of Pakistani films of 2016
