= Monk Skin Tone Scale =

Skin tone scale for machine learning research

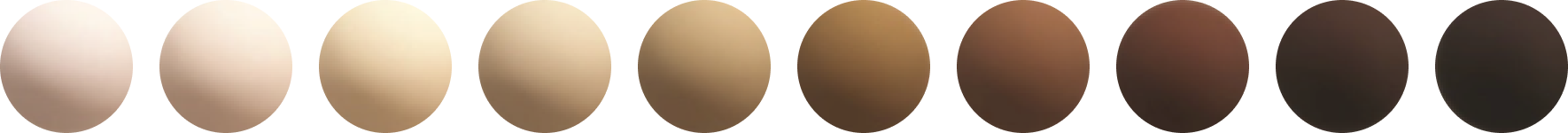
The ten orbs of the Monk Skin Tone Scale

The Monk Skin Tone Scale (MST) is an open-source, 10-shade scale describing human skin color. It was developed by Ellis Monk in partnership with Google and released in 2023.

The scale intends to replace the Fitzpatrick scale in fields such as computer vision research after an IEEE study found the Fitzpatrick scale to be "poorly predictive of skin tone." They noted that it tends to under-represent dark shades of skin relative to the global human population. The researchers then advised it "not be used as such in evaluations of computer vision applications."

The following table shows the 10 categories of the Monk Skin Tone Scale alongside the six categories of the Fitzpatrick scale, grouped into broad skin tone categories:

| Skin tone group | Monk scale 10 levels | | Fitzpatrick scale 6 levels | |
| Skin tone group | Levels | Allocation | Levels | Allocation |
|---|---|---|---|---|
| Light | 1–4 | 30% | I–III | 33% |
| Medium | 5–6 | 30% | III–IV | 33% |
| Dark | 7–10 | 40% | V–VI | 33% |

This table displays the colors of the ten MST skin tones:

MST Hex color codes
#f6ede4
#f3e7db
#f7ead0
#eadaba
#d7bd96
#a07e56
#825c43
#604134
#3a312a
#292420

== Predecessor ==
Computer vision researchers initially adopted the Fitzpatrick scale as a metric to evaluate how well a given collection of photos of people sampled the global population. However, the Fitzpatrick scale was not intended for this purpose; it was instead developed to predict the risk of skin cancer in lighter-skinned people. Initially, the Fitzpatrick scale did not include darker skin tones at all.

Two additional categories for people with darker skin tones were later added to the original four to make it more inclusive. However, despite these improvements, the Fitzpatrick skin tones correlate more with self-reported race than with objective measurements of skin tone. Accordingly, computer vision models trained using the Fitzpatrick scale perform poorly on images of people with darker skin.

== Use ==
The Monk scale includes 10 skin tones. Though other scales (such as those used by cosmetics companies) may include many more shades, Monk claims that 10 tones balances diversity with ease of use and can be used more consistently across different users than a scale with more tones:

Usually, if you got past 10 or 12 points on these types of scales [and] ask the same person to repeatedly pick out the same tones, the more you increase that scale, the less people are able to do that. Cognitively speaking, it just becomes really hard to accurately and reliably differentiate.

The primary intended application of the scale is in evaluating datasets for training computer vision models. Other proposed applications include increasing the diversity of image search results; for example, an image search for "doctor" may return images of doctors with a broad range of skin tones.

Google has cautioned against equating the shades in the scale with race, noting that skin tone can vary widely within race.

The Monk scale is open source. Its ten tones are licensed under the Creative Commons Attribution 4.0 International license.

== See also ==
- Fitzpatrick scale
- Von Luschan's chromatic scale
