= Fitzpatrick scale =

Classification of skin color and response to UV light

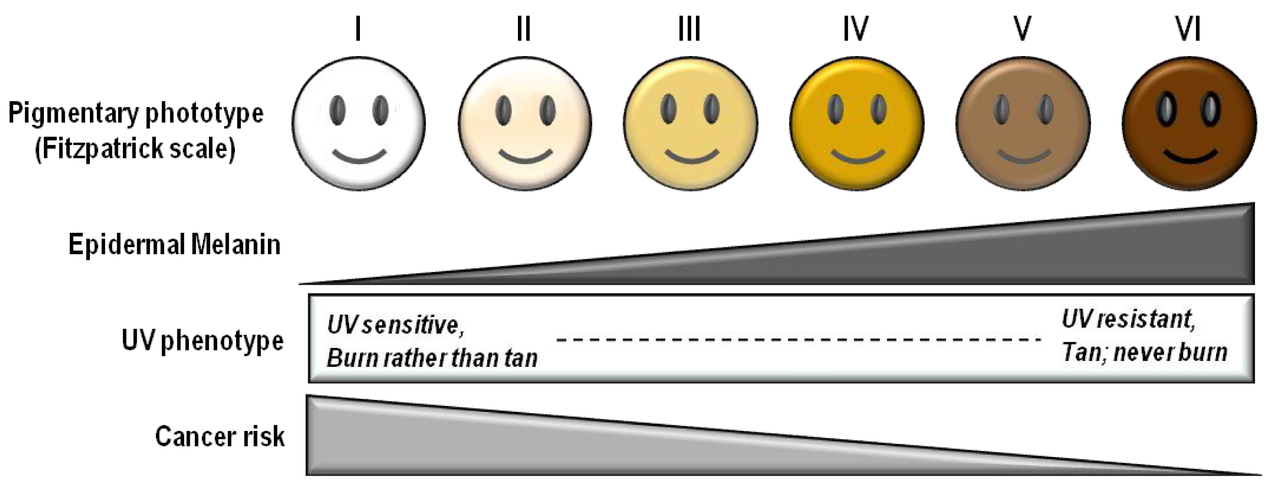
The Fitzpatrick scale and the risk of skin cancer

The Fitzpatrick scale (also Fitzpatrick skin typing test; or Fitzpatrick phototyping scale) is a numerical classification schema for human skin color. It was developed in 1975 by American dermatologist Thomas B. Fitzpatrick as a way to estimate the response of different types of skin to ultraviolet (UV) light. It was initially developed on the basis of skin color to measure the correct dose of UVA for PUVA therapy, and when the initial testing based only on hair and eye color resulted in too high UVA doses for some, it was altered to be based on the patient's reports of how their skin responds to the sun; it was also extended to a wider range of skin types. The Fitzpatrick scale remains a recognized tool for dermatological research into human skin pigmentation.

The following table shows the six categories of the Fitzpatrick scale in relation to the 36 categories of the older von Luschan scale:

Type	von Luschan	Fitzpatrick	Monk	Characteristics
White skin	1	I	1	Pale light skin, always burns, never tans (freckles); very light or white, "Celtic" type
White skin	2	I	1	Pale light skin, always burns, never tans (freckles); very light or white, "Celtic" type
White skin	3	I	1	Pale light skin, always burns, never tans (freckles); very light or white, "Celtic" type
White skin	4	I	2	Pale light skin, always burns, never tans (freckles); very light or white, "Celtic" type
White skin	5	I	2	Pale light skin, always burns, never tans (freckles); very light or white, "Celtic" type
Light skin	6	II	2	Light skin, usually burns, tans minimally (light colored but darker than pale); light or light-skinned European
Light skin	7	II	3	Light skin, usually burns, tans minimally (light colored but darker than pale); light or light-skinned European
Light skin	8	II	3	Light skin, usually burns, tans minimally (light colored but darker than pale); light or light-skinned European
Light skin	9	II	3	Light skin, usually burns, tans minimally (light colored but darker than pale); light or light-skinned European
Light skin	10	II	3	Light skin, usually burns, tans minimally (light colored but darker than pale); light or light-skinned European
Light/medium beige skin	11	III	4	Light to medium beige skin, sometimes burns, tans uniformly (golden or olive); light intermediate, dark-skinned European; light-skinned Middle eastern; or light-skinned Mediterranean; or light-skinned East Asian
Light/medium beige skin	12	III	4	Light to medium beige skin, sometimes burns, tans uniformly (golden or olive); light intermediate, dark-skinned European; light-skinned Middle eastern; or light-skinned Mediterranean; or light-skinned East Asian
Light/medium beige skin	13	III	4	Light to medium beige skin, sometimes burns, tans uniformly (golden or olive); light intermediate, dark-skinned European; light-skinned Middle eastern; or light-skinned Mediterranean; or light-skinned East Asian
Light/medium beige skin	14	III	4	Light to medium beige skin, sometimes burns, tans uniformly (golden or olive); light intermediate, dark-skinned European; light-skinned Middle eastern; or light-skinned Mediterranean; or light-skinned East Asian
Light/medium beige skin	15	III	5	Light to medium beige skin, sometimes burns, tans uniformly (golden or olive); light intermediate, dark-skinned European; light-skinned Middle eastern; or light-skinned Mediterranean; or light-skinned East Asian
Light brown skin	16	IV	5	Light brown skin, burns minimally, always tans well (moderate brown); dark intermediate or "olive skin"; Middle eastern, Mediterranean, Latin, or South Asian
Light brown skin	17	IV	5	Light brown skin, burns minimally, always tans well (moderate brown); dark intermediate or "olive skin"; Middle eastern, Mediterranean, Latin, or South Asian
Light brown skin	18	IV	5	Light brown skin, burns minimally, always tans well (moderate brown); dark intermediate or "olive skin"; Middle eastern, Mediterranean, Latin, or South Asian
Light brown skin	19	IV	6	Light brown skin, burns minimally, always tans well (moderate brown); dark intermediate or "olive skin"; Middle eastern, Mediterranean, Latin, or South Asian
Light brown skin	20	IV	6	Light brown skin, burns minimally, always tans well (moderate brown); dark intermediate or "olive skin"; Middle eastern, Mediterranean, Latin, or South Asian
Light brown skin	21	IV	6	Light brown skin, burns minimally, always tans well (moderate brown); dark intermediate or "olive skin"; Middle eastern, Mediterranean, Latin, or South Asian
Brown skin	22	V	7	Brown skin, very rarely burns, tans very easily (dark brown); dark or "brown" type
Brown skin	23	V	7	Brown skin, very rarely burns, tans very easily (dark brown); dark or "brown" type
Brown skin	24	V	7	Brown skin, very rarely burns, tans very easily (dark brown); dark or "brown" type
Brown skin	25	V	8	Brown skin, very rarely burns, tans very easily (dark brown); dark or "brown" type
Brown skin	26	V	8	Brown skin, very rarely burns, tans very easily (dark brown); dark or "brown" type
Brown skin	27	V	8	Brown skin, very rarely burns, tans very easily (dark brown); dark or "brown" type
Brown skin	28	V	9	Brown skin, very rarely burns, tans very easily (dark brown); dark or "brown" type
Dark skin	29	VI	9	Dark skin, never burns (deeply pigmented dark brown to darkest brown); very dark or "black" type; Nilotic
Dark skin	30	VI	10	Dark skin, never burns (deeply pigmented dark brown to darkest brown); very dark or "black" type; Nilotic
Dark skin	31	VI	10	Dark skin, never burns (deeply pigmented dark brown to darkest brown); very dark or "black" type; Nilotic
Dark skin	32	VI	10	Dark skin, never burns (deeply pigmented dark brown to darkest brown); very dark or "black" type; Nilotic
Dark skin	33	VI	10	Dark skin, never burns (deeply pigmented dark brown to darkest brown); very dark or "black" type; Nilotic
Dark skin	34	VI	10	Dark skin, never burns (deeply pigmented dark brown to darkest brown); very dark or "black" type; Nilotic
Dark skin	35	VI	10	Dark skin, never burns (deeply pigmented dark brown to darkest brown); very dark or "black" type; Nilotic
Dark skin	36	VI	10	Dark skin, never burns (deeply pigmented dark brown to darkest brown); very dark or "black" type; Nilotic

== Emoji modifiers ==
The Fitzpatrick scale is also the basis of skin color in emoji, with five modifiers according to the Fitzpatrick scale (types I and II merged).

== Eurocentric bias ==
The Fitzpatrick scale has been criticized for its Eurocentric bias and insufficient representation of global skin color diversity. The scale originally was developed for classifying "white skin" in response to solar radiation, and initially included only four categories focused on white skin, with "brown" and "black" skin types (V and VI) added as an afterthought.

The scale's methodology, relying on self-reporting of skin color, sunburn, and sun tanning response, fails to capture the broad spectrum of skin reflectance. Studies demonstrate that European populations have the narrowest skin color variation, whereas groups categorized as 'brown' or 'black' exhibit a much wider range.

The efficacy of the Fitzpatrick scale even among white-skinned individuals has been argued to be questionable, since studies such as that on a Dutch student population have found it inadequate for categorizing, challenging its appropriateness for investigating the relationship between sunburn tendency and tanning ability.

The Fitzpatrick scale's Eurocentric orientation and its limitations in accurately representing global skin color diversity, along with similar biases in classifying other phenotypic traits, have been argued to require more inclusive and scientifically valid categorizations in dermatological and genetic research.

== See also ==
- Monk Skin Tone Scale
- von Luschan's chromatic scale
- Skin reflectance
- Brown paper bag test
