= Light skin =

Human skin color

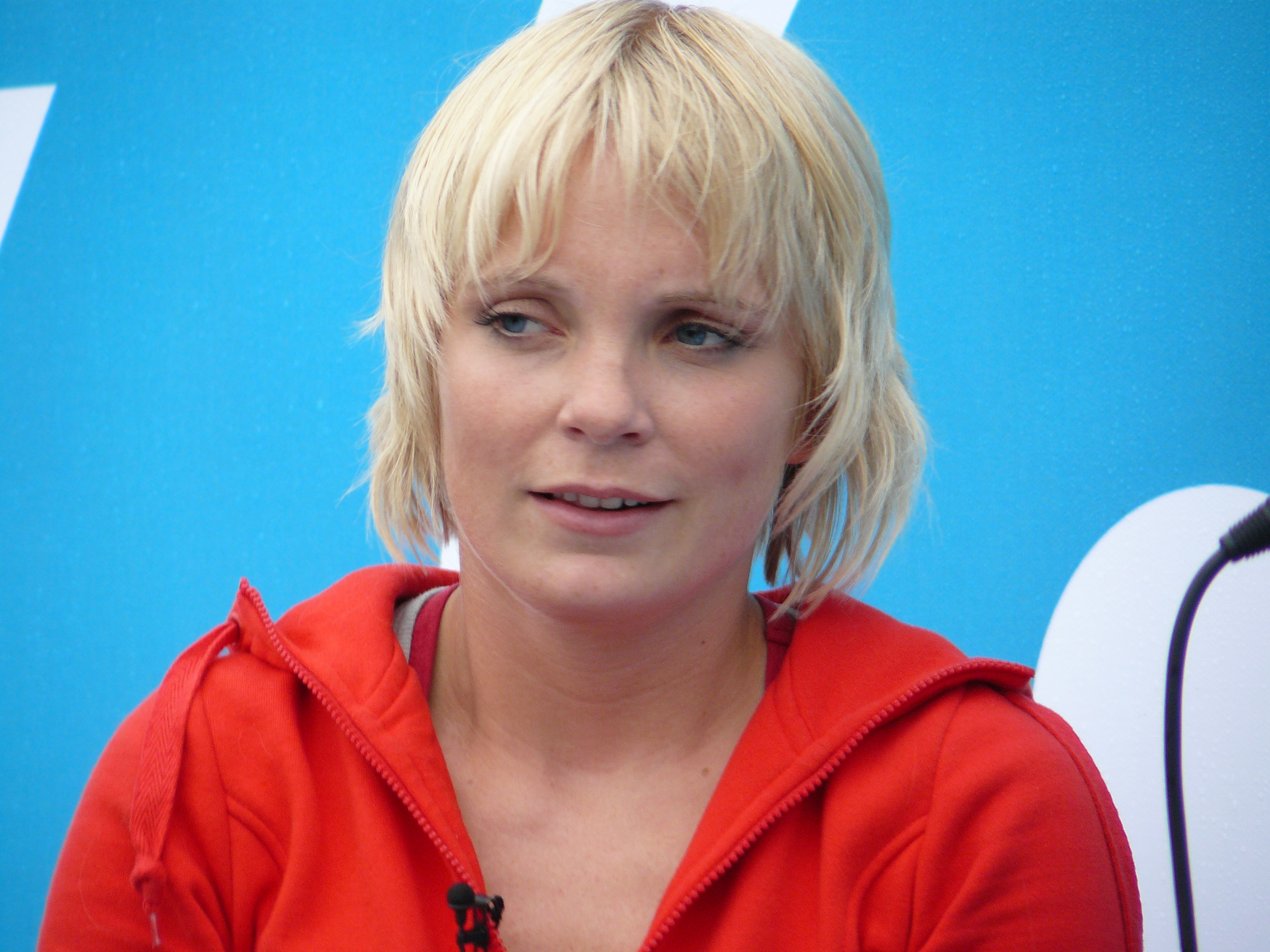
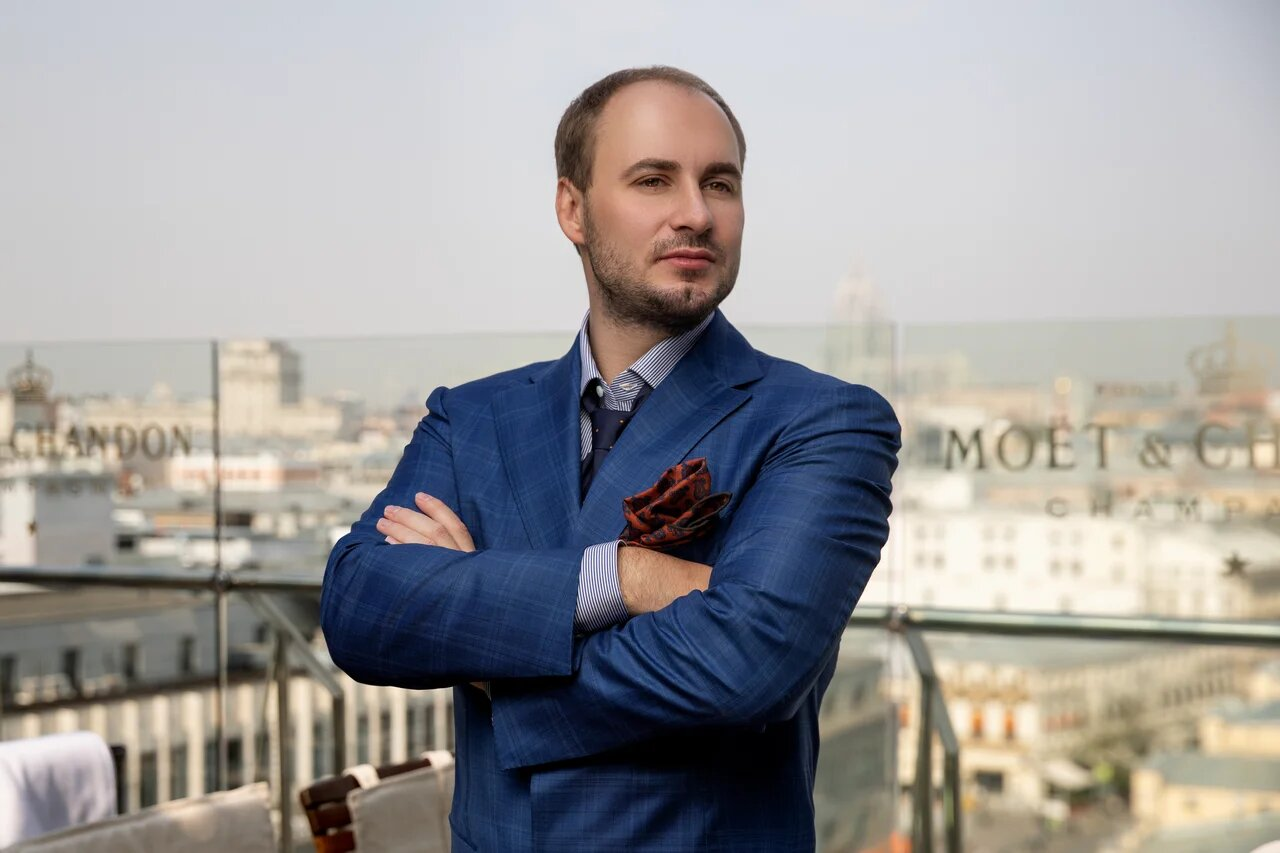
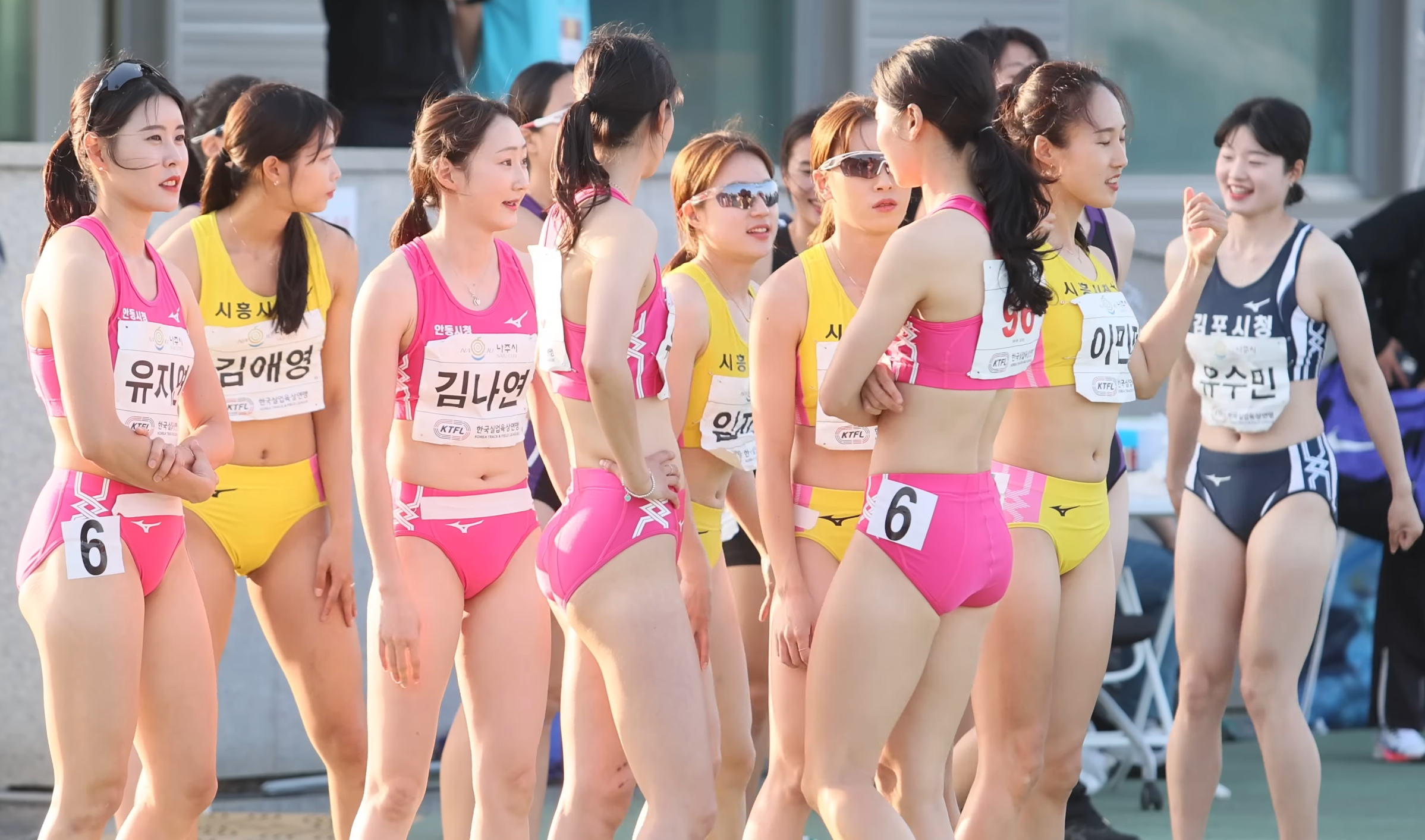
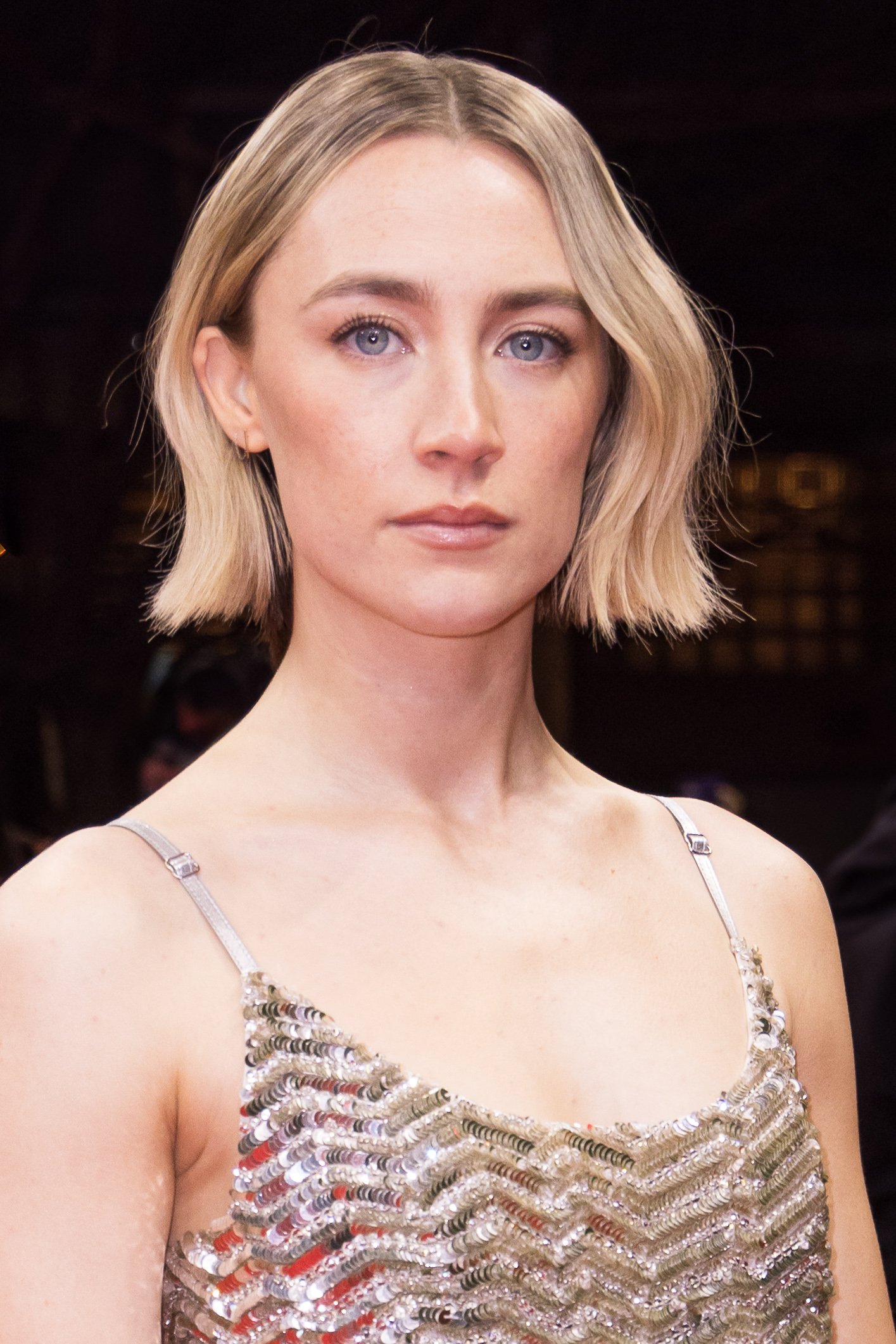
Ethnic groups such as Norwegians (top left), Russians (top right), Koreans (bottom left) and Irish (bottom right) are examples of people around the world who have light skin.

Light skin is a human skin color that has a low level of eumelanin pigmentation as an adaptation to environments of low UV radiation. Due to migrations of people in recent centuries, light-skinned populations today are found all over the world. Light skin is most commonly found amongst the native populations of Europe, East Asia, West Asia, Central Asia, Indian subcontinent, Siberia, and North Africa as measured through skin reflectance. People with light skin pigmentation are often referred to as "white", but the majority of countries officially categorize people by ethnic or national origin and not by perceived skin tone. Furthermore, definitions and perceptions of "ethnicity" or "race" vary greatly from country to country.

Humans with light skin pigmentation have skin with low amounts of eumelanin, and possess fewer melanosomes than humans with dark skin pigmentation. Light skin provides better absorption qualities of ultraviolet radiation, which helps the body to synthesize higher amounts of vitamin D for bodily processes such as calcium development. On the other hand, light-skinned people who live near the equator, where there is abundant sunlight, are at an increased risk of folate depletion. As a consequence of folate depletion, they are at a higher risk of DNA damage, birth defects, and numerous types of cancers, especially skin cancer. Humans with darker skin who live further from the tropics may have lower vitamin D levels, which can also lead to health complications, both physical and mental, including miscarriage and a greater risk of developing schizophrenia. These two observations form the "vitamin D–folate hypothesis", which attempts to explain why populations that migrated away from the tropics into areas of low UV radiation evolved to have light skin pigmentation.

The distribution of light-skinned populations is highly correlated with the low ultraviolet radiation levels of the regions inhabited by them. Historically, light-skinned populations almost exclusively lived far from the equator, in high latitude areas with low sunlight intensity.

== Evolution ==
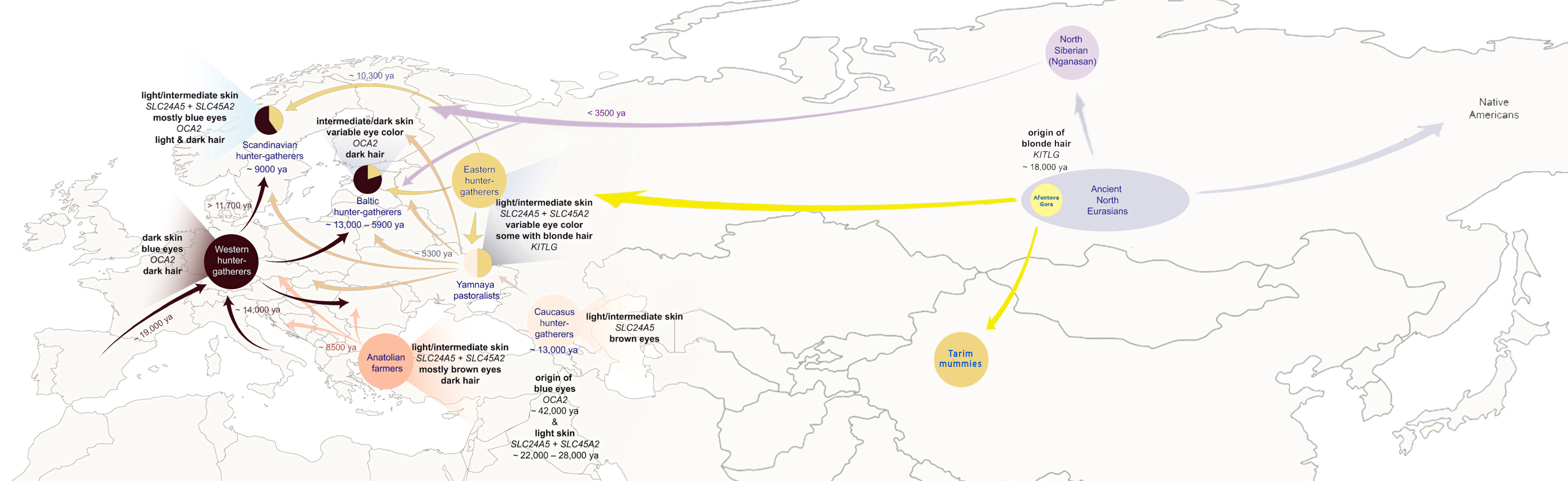
History of human pigmentation in Europe (with Asia geographic extension). European populations, like the Scandinavian Hunter-Gatherers, already had higher levels of light pigmentation variants compared to their ancestors from other parts of Europe, suggesting adaptation to low light conditions thousands of years ago. Some authors have expressed caution regarding the dark skin pigmentation predictions for Upper Paleolithic Europeans.

It is generally accepted that dark skin evolved as a protection against the effect of UV radiation; eumelanin protects against both folate depletion and direct damage to DNA. This accounts for the darker skin pigmentation of Homo sapiens during their development in Africa; the major migrations out of Africa to colonize the rest of the world were also dark-skinned. It is widely supposed that light skin pigmentation developed due to the importance of maintaining vitamin D3 production in the skin. Strong selective pressure would be expected for the evolution of light skin in areas of low UV radiation.

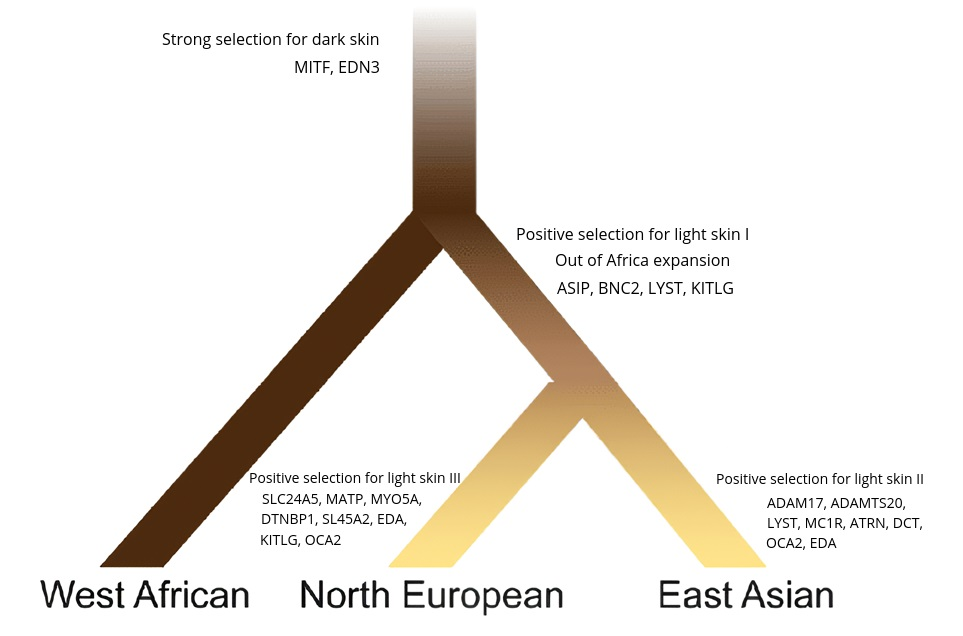
Evolutionary model of human pigmentation in three continental populations

After the ancestors of West Eurasians and East Eurasians diverged more than 40,000 years ago, lighter skin tones evolved independently in a subset of each of the two populations. In West Eurasians (in Europe, Western Asia, North Africa and Caucasus), the A111T allele of the rs1426654 polymorphism in the pigmentation gene SLC24A5 has the largest skin lightening effect and became widespread in Europe, Indian subcontinent, Central Asia, the Middle East and North Africa.

In a 2013 study, Canfield et al. established that SLC24A5 sits in a block of haplotypes, one of which (C11) is shared by virtually all chromosomes that bear the A111T variant. This "equivalence" between C11 and A111T indicates that all people who carry this skin-lightening allele descend from a common origin: a single carrier who lived most likely "between the Middle East and the Indian subcontinent". Canfield et al. attempted to date the A111T mutation but only constrained the age range to before the Neolithic which began some 10,000 years ago in Western Asia. However, a second study from the same year (Basu Mallick et al.) estimated the coalescent age (split date) for this allele to between ~28,000 and ~22,000 years ago.

The second most important skin-lightening factor in West Eurasians is the depigmenting allele F374 of the rs16891982 polymorphism located in the melanin-synthesis gene SLC45A2. From its low haplotype diversity, Yuasa et al. (2006) likewise concluded that this mutation (L374F) "occurred only once in the ancestry of Caucasians".

Summarizing these studies, Hanel and Carlberg (2020) decided that the alleles of the two genes SLC24A5 and SLC45A2 which are most associated with lighter skin colour in modern and historical era Europeans, Middle Easterners, North Africans, Central Asians and South Asians originated in West Asia about 22,000 to 28,000 years ago and these two mutations each arose in a single carrier. This is consistent with Jones et al. (2015), who reconstructed the relationship between Near Eastern Neolithic farmers and Caucasus Hunter-Gatherers: two populations which carried the light skin variant of SLC24A5. Analysing newly sequenced ancient genomes, Jones et al. estimated the split date at ~24,000 bp and localised the separation to somewhere south of the Caucasus in Anatolia, Mesopotamia, Iran or Levant. However, a coalescent analysis of this allele by Crawford et al. (2017) gave a more narrowly constrained, and earlier, split date of ~29,000 years ago (with a 95% confidence window from 28,000 to 31,000 bp).

The light skin variants of SLC24A5 and SLC45A2 were present in Anatolia, Mesopotamia, Levant and Iran by 9,000 years ago, where they became associated with the Neolithic Revolution. From here, their carriers spread Neolithic farming into and across Europe and North Africa. Lighter skin and fair to blond hair also evolved in the Ancient North Eurasian population.

A further wave of lighter-skinned populations across Europe (and elsewhere) is associated with the Yamnaya culture and the Indo-European migrations bearing Ancient North Eurasian ancestry and the KITLG allele for blond hair. Furthermore, the SLC24A5 gene linked with light pigmentation in Europeans was introduced into East Africa from West Asia and Europe over five thousand years ago, possibly linked to the spread of Afroasiatic languages from Western Asia. These alleles can now be found in the San, Ethiopians, and Tanzanian populations with Afro-Asiatic ancestry. The SLC24A5 in Ethiopia maintains a substantial frequency with Semitic and Cushitic speaking populations, compared with Omotic, Nilotic or Niger-Congo speaking groups, who are darker skinned. It is inferred that it may have arrived into the region via migration from the Levant, Arabian Peninsula or Mesopotamia, which is also supported by linguistic evidence. In the San people, it was acquired from interactions with Eastern African pastoralists. Meanwhile, in the case of East Asia and the Americas, a variation of the MFSD12 gene is responsible for lighter skin colour. The modern association between skin tone and latitude is thus a relatively recent development.

According to Crawford et al. (2017), most of the genetic variants associated with light and dark pigmentation appear to have originated more than 300,000 years ago. Sub Saharan African, South Asian and Australo-Melanesian populations also carry derived alleles for dark skin pigmentation that are not found in Europeans, West Asians, North Africans or East Asians. Huang et al. (2021) found the existence of "selective pressure on light pigmentation in the ancestral population of Europeans, West Asians and East Asians", prior to the divergence of their ancestors. Skin pigmentation was also found to be affected by directional selection towards darker skin among sub Saharan Africans, as well as lighter skin among Eurasians. Crawford et al. (2017) found evidence for the emergence of alleles associated with lighter and darker pigmentation prior to the origin of modern humans at c. 300kya.

The predominance of lighter skin among East Asians and Southeast Asians can be traced back to the positive selection for the rs1800414-G allele thought to date back to the Late Palaeolithic period (c. 25–30 kya), following the northward migration of modern humans from South/Southeast Asia. This allele is distinct from that observed among West Eurasians in Europe, Western Asia, North Africa and Indian sub continent.

The A111T mutation in the SLC24A5 gene predominates in populations with Western Eurasian ancestry. The geographical distribution shows that it is nearly fixed in all of Europe, the Middle East, much of North Africa and extending east to some populations in present-day Pakistan, Afghanistan, Northern India and Central Asia. It shows a latitudinal decline toward the Equator, with high frequencies in North Africa (80%), and intermediate (40−60%) in Ethiopia and Somalia.

=== Ancient populations ===
Some authors have expressed caution regarding the skin pigmentation SNP predictions in early Paleolithic groups. According to Ju et al. (2021): "Relatively dark skin pigmentation in Early Upper Paleolithic Europe would be consistent with those populations being relatively poorly adapted to high-latitude conditions as a result of having recently migrated from lower latitudes. On the other hand, although we have shown that these populations carried few of the light pigmentation alleles that are segregating in present-day Europe, they may have carried different alleles that we cannot now detect. As an extreme example, Neanderthals and the Altai Denisovan individual show genetic scores that are in a similar range to Early Upper Paleolithic individuals, but it is highly plausible that these populations, who lived at high latitudes for hundreds of thousands of years, would have adapted independently to low UV levels. For this reason, we cannot confidently make statements about the skin pigmentation of ancient populations."

Research in 2022 inferred that the use of an "intermediate" skin tone phenotype, are for those commonly found in present-day Southern European, West Asians, North Africans and Mediterranean populations, as opposed to "pale" ones in present-day Northern Europeans.

==== Europe ====
A study from 2015 found that genes contributing to fair skin were nearly fixed in the Anatolian and nearby Neolithic Farmers: "The second strongest signal in our analysis is at the derived allele of rs16891982 in SLC45A2, which contributes to light skin pigmentation and is almost fixed in present-day Europeans but occurred at much lower frequency in ancient populations. In contrast, the derived allele of SLC24A5 that is the other major determinant of light skin pigmentation in modern Europe appears fixed in the Anatolian Neolithic, suggesting that its rapid increase in frequency to around 0.9 (90%) in Early Neolithic Europe was mostly due to migration."

In 2018, a study was released showing many late Mesolithic Scandinavians from 9,500 years ago in Northern Europe had blonde hair and light skin, which was in contrast to some of their contemporaries, the darker toned Western Hunter Gatherers (WHG). However, a 2024 paper found that phenotypically most of their studied WHG individuals carried the dark skin and blue eyes characteristic of WHGs, but some other WHGs in France they sequenced also had pale to intermediate skin pigmentation. Another entry in 2018, showed that the Eastern Hunter Gatherers (EHG), Scandinavian Hunter Gatherers (SHG), and the Baltic foragers, all had the derived alleles for light skin pigmentation.

The Western Steppe Herders, an early Bronze Age population of the Eurasian Steppe are believed to have also contributed to the skin and hair pigmentation in Europe, having a dominant effect on the phenotypes of Northern Europeans in particular.

Bagnasco, G et al. (2024), discovered that the phenotypic traits for a group of Etruscans from 3,000 to 2,700 years ago showed a population with blue-eyes, light to dark brown hair, and pale white to intermediate skin tones.

In 2025 a downsampling experiment attempted to gauge phenotypes of ancient Europeans across many regions using low coverage methods (~8x). They found that for skin traits in the Palaeolithic (12 samples), the Russian Kostenki 14 (38,700 and 36,200 y ago) was the only one to exhibit an intermediate skin colour, with the remainder having dark phenotypes. During the Mesolithic (53 samples), there was more variability with 7 samples being intermediate, and 3 being pale. The Neolithic (93 samples) showed 25 intermediate and 5 pale. Copper-Age (28 samples) had 7 intermediate and 4 pale. The Bronze-Age (43 samples) had 15 intermediate and 6 pale. Lastly, the Iron-Age (11 samples) had 6 intermediate and 2 pale samples. They highlighted some caution with using this imputational approach at such low coverage using HIrisPlex-S.

==== Middle-East ====
In 2015, it was discovered that 13,000 year old samples of Caucasus Hunter Gatherers (CHG) from Georgia carried the mutation and derived alleles for very light skinned pigmentation similar to Early Farmers (EF). This trait was said to have a relatively long history in Eurasia and risen to high frequency during the Neolithic expansion originating in Western Asia, with its origin probably predating the Last Glacial Maximum (LGM).

An individual from the Pre-Pottery Neolithic in Ain' Ghazal, Jordan had both of the major derived 'European' depigmentation alleles (AA, SLC45A2: rs16891982 and SLC24A5: rs1426654), while another only had one of the SLC24A5 ancestral genotypes (GG). It indicated evidence of a more northerly origin for this population, possibly indicating an influx from the region of northeastern Anatolia.

A study on the populations of the Chalcolithic Levant (6,000-7,000 years ago), found that an allele rs1426654 in the SLC24A5 gene which is one of the most important determinants of light pigmentation in West Eurasians, was fixed for the derived variants in all Levant Chalcolithic samples, suggesting that the light skinned phenotype may have been common in the community. The individuals also had high incidence of genomic markers associated with blue-eye color.

==== Africa ====
A research paper published in 2017 indicated Egyptians at Abusir el-Meleq from 2,590 to 2,023 years ago, had a derived variant for the SLC24A5 locus, which contributes to lighter skin pigmentation, and was shown to be at high frequency in Neolithic Anatolia, accordant with the sample's ancestral affinities. Parabon NanoLabs (2021) based on this data from Schuenemann et al. (2017) using whole genome sequencing and advanced bioinformatics, further discovered that these ancient Egyptian samples instead had a light brown complexion, but carried the main gene for light skin. They stated the results were highly consistent with Schueneman et al.'s findings.

In the same year, according to phenotype SNP analysis, the precolonial Guanche inhabitants of the Canary Islands were showing consistent traits such as light and medium skin, with dark hair and brown eyes.

A paper conducted by Fregel, Rosa et al. (2018) showed that in North Africa, Late Neolithic Moroccans had the European/Caucasus derived SLC24A5 mutation and other alleles and genes that predispose individuals to lighter skin and eye colours.

== Geographic distribution; ultraviolet and vitamin D ==
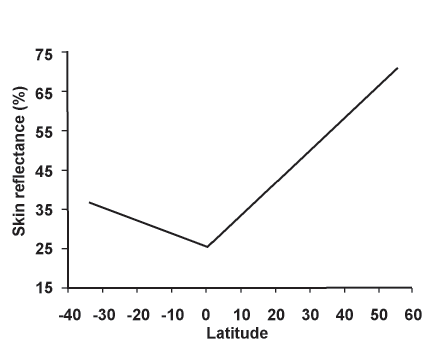
Skin reflectance vs. latitude

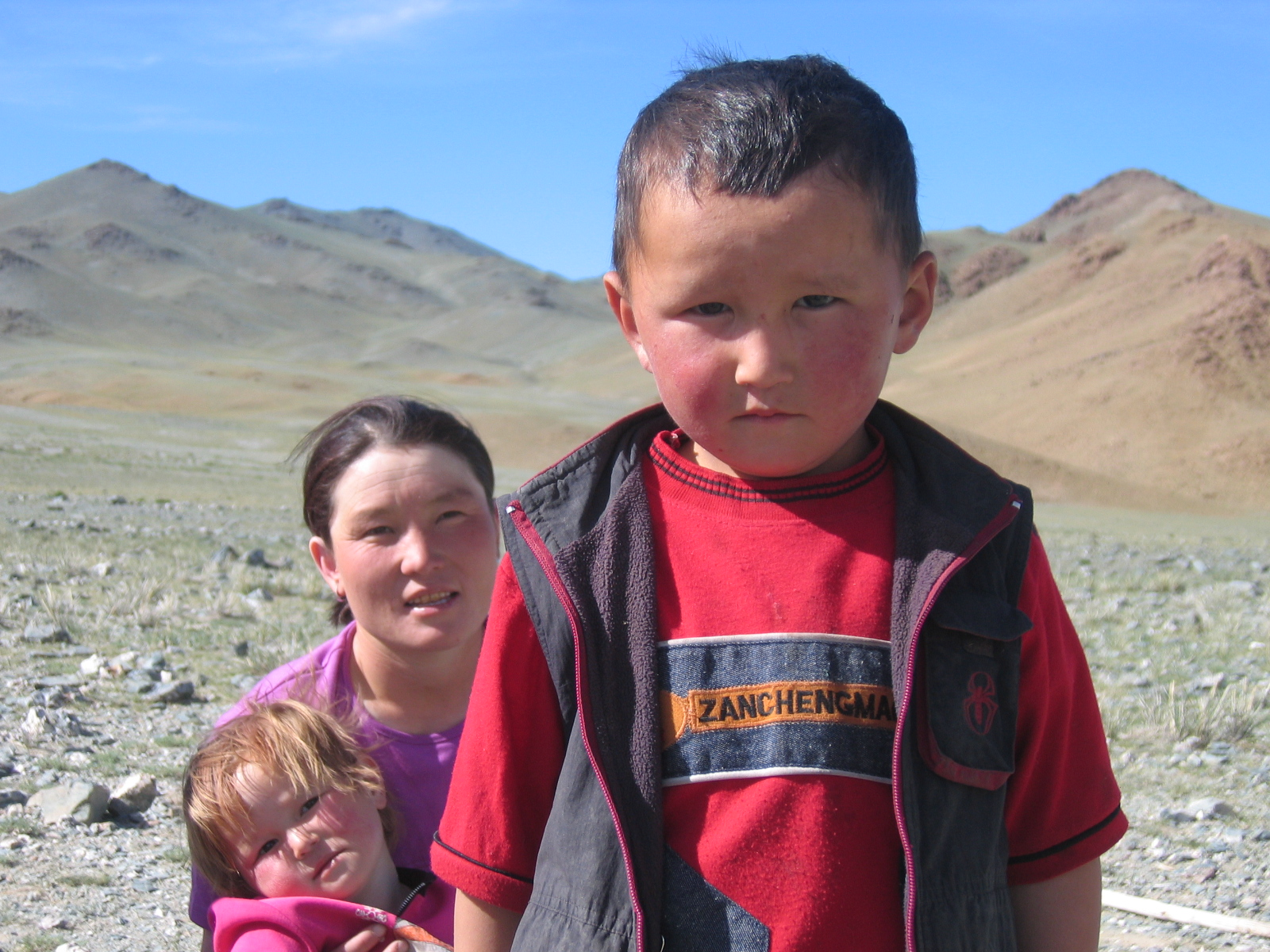
Some people in Mongolia have light skin.

In the 1960s, biochemist W. Farnsworth Loomis suggested that skin colour is related to the body's need for vitamin D. The major positive effect of UV radiation in land-living vertebrates is the ability to synthesize vitamin D3 from it. A certain amount of vitamin D helps the body to absorb more calcium which is essential for building and maintaining bones, especially for developing embryos. Vitamin D production depends on exposure to sunlight. Humans living at latitudes far from the equator developed light skin in order to help absorb more vitamin D. People with light (type II) skin can produce previtamin D3 in their skin at rates 5–10 times faster than dark-skinned (type V) people.

In 1998, anthropologist Nina Jablonski and her husband George Chaplin collected spectrometer data to measure UV radiation levels around the world and compared it to published information on the skin colour of indigenous populations of more than 50 countries. The results showed a very high correlation between UV radiation and skin colour; the weaker the sunlight was in a geographic region, the lighter the indigenous people's skin tended to be.

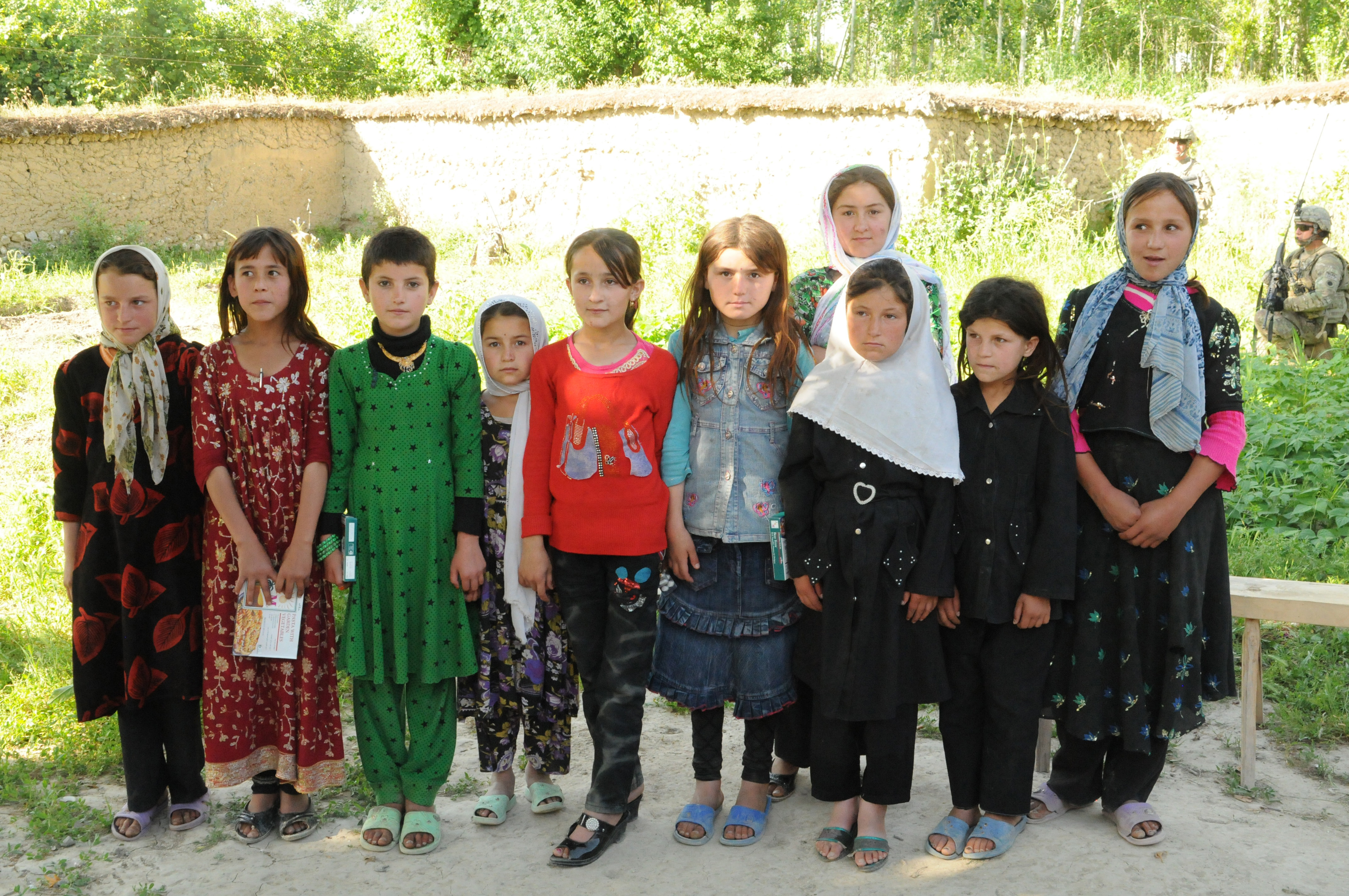
Many people in northern Afghanistan have light skin.

Jablonski points out that people living above the latitudes of 50 degrees have the highest chance of developing vitamin D deficiency. She suggests that people living far from the equator developed light skin to produce adequate amounts of vitamin D during winter with low levels of UV radiation. Genetic studies suggest that light-skinned humans have been selected for multiple times.

== Polar regions, vitamin D, and diet ==
Polar regions of the Northern Hemisphere receive little UV radiation, and even less vitamin D-producing UVB, for most of the year. These regions were uninhabited by humans until about 12,000 years ago. (In northern Fennoscandia at least, human populations arrived soon after deglaciation.) Areas like Scandinavia, Baltic, British Isles and Siberia have very low concentrations of ultraviolet radiation, and indigenous populations are overwhelmingly light-skinned. People from Ireland are exceptionally fair skinned. According to the Irish Skin Foundation, 93% of Irish people fall into the type 1 and type 2 classifications on the Fitzpatrick scale. A 1997 survey found the prevalence of type 1 and type 2 to be 76%. 20th century anthropologist Carleton S. Coon referred to the Irish as being "almost uniquely pale skinned when unexposed, untanned parts of the body are observed", noting that out of 10,000 men, over 90% had untanned complexions of a "pale pink" shade represented by #3 on the von Luschan scale.

However, dietary factors may allow vitamin D sufficiency even in dark skinned populations. Many indigenous populations across Northern Europe and Northern Asia survive by consuming reindeer, which they follow and herd. Reindeer meat, organs, and fat contain large amounts of vitamin D which the reindeer get from eating substantial amounts of lichen. Some people of the polar regions, like the Inuit (Eskimos), retained their dark skin; they ate Vitamin D-rich seafood, such as fish and sea mammal blubber.

Furthermore, these people have been living in the far north for less than 7,000 years. As their founding populations lacked alleles for light skin colour, they may have had insufficient time for significantly lower melanin production to have been selected for by nature after being introduced by random mutations. "This was one of the last barriers in the history of human settlement," Jablonski states. "Only after humans learned fishing, and therefore had access to food rich in vitamin D, could they settle regions of high latitude." Additionally, in the spring, Inuit would receive high levels of UV radiation as reflection from the snow, and their relatively darker skin then protects them from the sunlight.

=== Earlier hypotheses ===
Two other main hypotheses have been put forward to explain the development of light skin pigmentation: resistance to cold injury, and genetic drift; now both of them are considered unlikely to be the main mechanism behind the evolution of light skin.

The resistance to cold injury hypothesis claimed that dark skin was selected against in cold climates far from the equator and in higher altitudes as dark skin was more affected by frostbite. It has been found that reaction of the skin to extreme cold climates has actually more to do with other aspects, such as the distribution of connective tissue and distribution of fat, and with the responsiveness of peripheral capillaries to differences in temperature, and not with pigmentation.

The supposition that dark skin evolved in the absence of selective pressure was put forward by the probable mutation effect hypothesis. The main factor initiating the development of light skin was seen as a consequence of genetic mutation without an evolutionary selective pressure. The subsequent spread of light skin was thought to be caused by assortive mating and sexual selection contributed to an even lighter pigmentation in females. Doubt has been cast on this hypothesis, as more random patterns of skin colouration would be expected in contrast to the observed structural light skin pigmentation in areas of low UV radiation. The clinal (gradual) distribution of skin pigmentation observable in the Eastern hemisphere, and to a lesser extent in the Western hemisphere, is one of the most significant characteristics of human skin pigmentation. Increasingly lighter skinned populations are distributed across areas with incrementally lower levels of UV radiation.

== Genetic associations ==
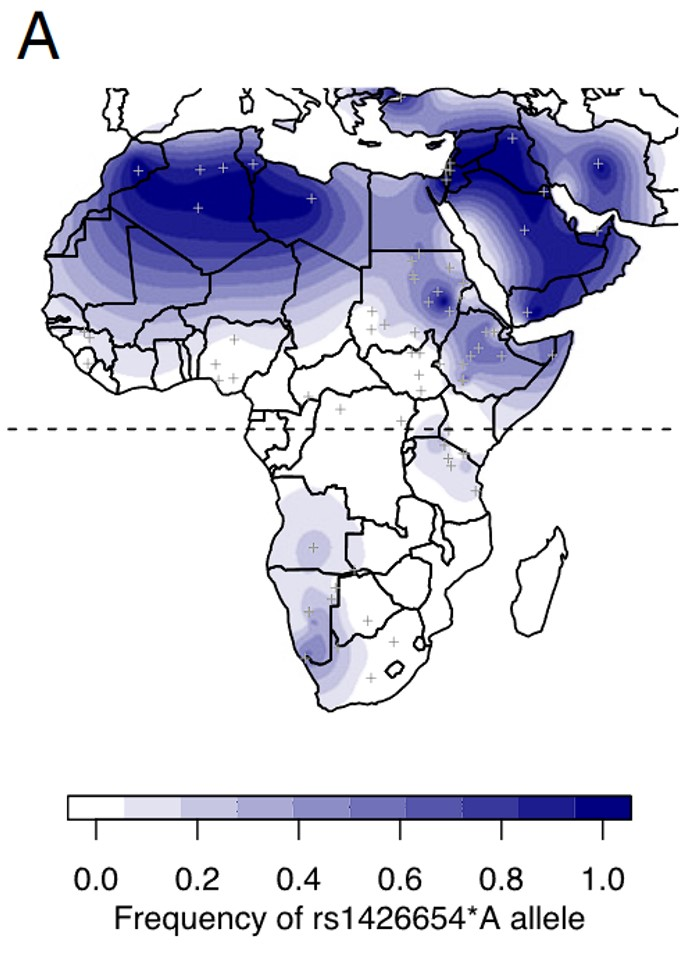
Frequency of the SLC24A5 rs1426654 *A allele in the Near East and Africa

Variations in the KITL gene have been positively associated with about 20% of melanin concentration differences between African and non-African populations. One of the alleles of the gene has an 80% occurrence rate in Eurasian populations. The ASIP gene has a 75–80% variation rate among Eurasian populations compared to 20–25% in African populations. Variations in the SLC24A5 gene account for 20–25% of the variation between dark and light skinned populations of Africa, and appear to have arisen as recently as within the last 10,000 years. The Ala111Thr or rs1426654 polymorphism in the coding region of the SLC24A5 gene reaches fixation in Europe, but is found across the globe, particularly among populations in Northern Africa, the Horn of Africa, West Asia, Central Asia and Indian subcontinent. The rs1426654-A allele in the SLC24A5 also plays a significant role in skin tone variation in North India.

The derived Ala111Thr allele in the SLC24A5 gene locus known to be associated with lighter skin pigmentation was in top selection signals in the Wolayta, and the select alleles of single-nucleotide polymorphisms rs1426654 and rs1834640 characteristic of fair complexions in Eurasian populations were of high frequency (47.9%) in this Omotic-speaking Ethiopian population. A higher proportion of these genes MYEF2-SLC24A5 were seen in high altitude (Amhara and Tigray) compared with the low-altitude (Afar) Ethiopians, with also elevated European admixture proportions observed in the high altitude tribes. The authors did not rule out the possibility that these European alleles were differentially selected in high-altitude populations due to unknown selective pressures.

Africans carrying Eurasian ancestry like the Toubou were shown to have signals at HERC2 rs1129038, a major contributor to blue eye color in Europeans, as well as a signal at SLC24A5 rs1834640, a major contributor to pigmentation.

== Biochemistry ==
Melanin is a derivative of the amino acid tyrosine. Eumelanin is the dominant form of melanin found in human skin. Eumelanin protects tissues and DNA from radiation damage by UV light. Melanin is produced in specialized cells called melanocytes, which are found in the lowest level of the epidermis. Melanin is produced inside small membrane-bound packages called melanosomes. Humans with naturally occurring light skin have varied amounts of smaller and sparsely distributed eumelanin and its lighter-coloured relative, pheomelanin. The concentration of pheomelanin varies highly within populations from individual to individual, but it is more commonly found among lightly pigmented Europeans, East Asians, and Native Americans.

For the same body region, individuals, independently of skin colour, have the same amount of melanocytes (however variation between different body parts is substantial), but organelles which contain pigments, called melanosomes, are smaller and less numerous in light-skinned humans.

For people with very light skin, the skin gets most of its colour from the bluish-white connective tissue in the dermis and from the haemoglobin associated blood cells circulating in the capillaries of the dermis. The colour associated with the circulating haemoglobin becomes more obvious, especially in the face, when arterioles dilate and become tumefied with blood as a result of prolonged physical exercise or stimulation of the sympathetic nervous system (usually embarrassment or anger). Up to 50% of UVA can penetrate deeply into the dermis in persons with light skin pigmentation with little protective melanin pigment.

The combination of light skin, red hair, and freckling is associated with high amount of pheomelanin, little amounts of eumelanin. This phenotype is caused by a loss-of-function mutation in the melanocortin 1 receptor (MC1R) gene. However, variations in the MC1R gene sequence only have considerable influence on pigmentation in populations where red hair and extremely light skin is prevalent. The gene variation's primary effect is to promote eumelanin synthesis at the expense of pheomelanin synthesis, although this contributes to very little variation in skin reflectance between different ethnic groups. Melanocytes from light skin cells cocultured with keratinocytes give rise to a distribution pattern characteristic of light skin.

Freckles usually only occur in people with very lightly pigmented skin. They vary from very dark to brown in colour and develop a random pattern on the skin of the individual. Solar lentigines, the other types of freckles, occur among old people regardless of skin colour. People with very light skin (types I and II) make very little melanin in their melanocytes, and have very little or no ability to produce melanin in the stimulus of UV radiation. This can result in frequent sunburns and a more dangerous, but invisible, damage done to connective tissue and DNA underlying the skin. This can contribute to premature aging and skin cancer. The strongly red appearance of lightly pigmented skin as a response to high UV radiation levels is caused by the increased diameter, number, and blood flow of the capillaries.

People with moderately pigmented skin (Types III-IV) are able to produce melanin in their skin in response to UVR. Normal tanning is usually delayed as it takes time for the melanins to move up in the epidermis. Heavy tanning does not approach the photoprotective effect against UVR-induced DNA damage compared to naturally occurring dark skin, however it offers great protection against seasonal variations in UVR. Gradually developed tan in the spring prevents sunburns in the summer. This mechanism is almost certainly the evolutionary reason behind the development of tanning behaviour.

== Health implications ==
Skin pigmentation is an evolutionary adaptation to the various UV radiation levels around the world. There are health implications of light-skinned people living in environments of high UV radiation. Various cultural practices increase problems related to health conditions of light skin, for example sunbathing among the light-skinned.

=== Advantages in low sunlight ===
Humans with light skin pigmentation living in low sunlight environments experience increased vitamin D synthesis compared to humans with dark skin pigmentation due to the ability to absorb more sunlight. Almost every part of the human body, including the skeleton, the immune system, and brain requires vitamin D. Vitamin D production in the skin begins when UV radiation penetrates the skin and interacts with a cholesterol-like molecule produce pre-vitamin D3. This reaction only occurs in the presence of medium length UVR, UVB. Most of the UVB and UVC rays are destroyed or reflected by ozone, oxygen, and dust in the atmosphere. UVB reaches the Earth's surface in the highest amounts when its path is straight and goes through a little layer of atmosphere.

The farther a place is from the equator, the less UVB is received, and the potential to produce of vitamin D is diminished. Some regions far from the equator do not receive UVB radiation at all between autumn and spring. Vitamin D deficiency does not kill its victims quickly, and generally does not kill at all. Rather it weakens the immune system, the bones, and compromises the body's ability to fight uncontrolled cell division which results in cancer. A form of vitamin D is a potent cell growth inhibitor; thus chronic deficiencies of vitamin D seem to be associated with higher risk of certain cancers. This is an active topic of cancer research and is still debated. The vitamin D deficiency associated with dark skin leads to higher levels of schizophrenia in such populations residing in northerly latitudes.

With the increase of vitamin D synthesis, there is a decreased incidence of conditions that are related to common vitamin D deficiency conditions of people with dark skin pigmentation living in environments of low UV radiation: rickets, osteoporosis, numerous cancer types (including colon and breast cancer), and immune system malfunctioning. Vitamin D promotes the production of cathelicidin, which helps to defend humans' bodies against fungal, bacterial, and viral infections, including flu. When exposed to UVB, the entire exposed area of body's skin of a relatively light skinned person is able to produce between 10 and 20000 IU of vitamin D.

=== Disadvantages in high sunlight ===
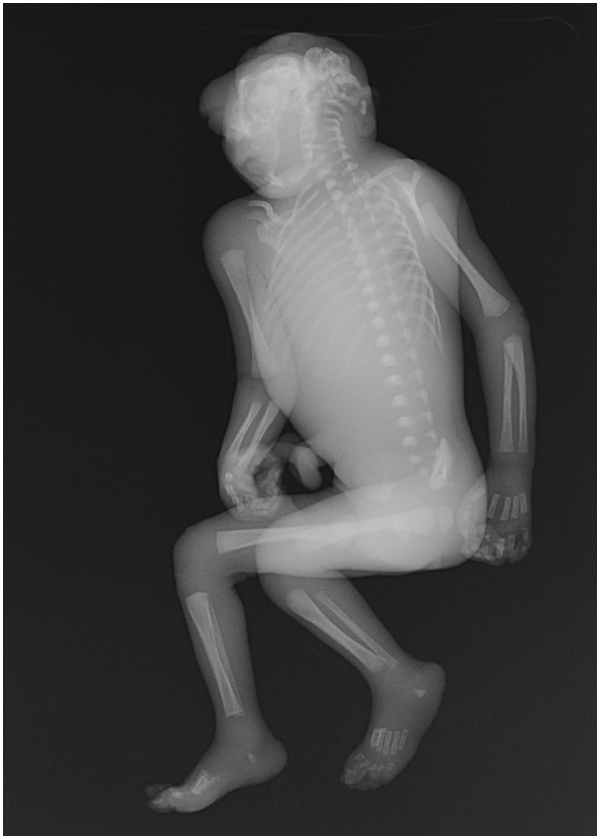
Fatal neural tube defect with evident anencephaly

Light-skinned people living in high sunlight environments are more susceptible to the harmful UV rays of sunlight because of the lack of melanin produced in the skin. The most common risk that comes with high exposure to sunlight is the increased risk of sunburns. This increased risk has come along with the cultural practice of sunbathing, which is popular among light-skinned populations. This cultural practice to gain tanned skin if not regulated properly can lead to sunburn, especially among very lightly skinned humans. The overexposure to sunlight also can lead to basal cell carcinoma, which is a common form of skin cancer.

Another health implication is the depletion of folate within the body, where the overexposure to UV light can lead to megaloblastic anemia. Folate deficiency in pregnant women can be detrimental to the health of their newborn babies in the form of neural tube defects, miscarriages, and spina bifida, a birth defect in which the backbone and spinal canal do not close before birth. The peak of neural tube defect occurrences is the highest in the May–June period in the Northern Hemisphere. Folate is needed for DNA replication in dividing cells and deficiency can lead to failures of normal embryogenesis and spermatogenesis.

Individuals with lightly pigmented skin who are repeatedly exposed to strong UV radiation, experience faster aging of the skin, which shows in increased wrinkling and anomalies of pigmentation. Oxidative damage causes the degradation of protective tissue in the dermis, which confers the strength of the skin. It has been postulated that white women may develop wrinkles faster than black women after menopause because white women are more susceptible to sun damage throughout life. Dr. Hugh S. Taylor, of Yale School of Medicine, concluded that the study could not prove the findings but they suspect the underlying cause. Light-coloured skin has been suspected to be one of the contributing factors that promote wrinkling.

== See also ==
- Albinism in humans
- Blond
- Cold and heat adaptations in humans
- Dark skin
- Discrimination based on skin tone
- Hair texture
- High yellow
- Olive skin
- Red hair
- Skin whitening
