= Azeem Sajjad =

Pakistani actor

- Born: May 3, 1970 (age 56); Quetta, Balochistan, Pakistan
- Occupations: Actor, writer, director

Azeem Sajjad (Urdu: عظیم سجاد) is a Pakistani actor, writer, and director. He is best known for his role in the 2016 thriller film 8969 along with Saba Qamar, directed by himself. His other notable works include Ehd-e-Wafa, Raqs-e-Bismil, Za Pakhtoon Yum, and Baandi.

== Career ==
Sajjad attended the International Writing Program at the University of Iowa, in 2009.

He has directed Adan, Meer Abru, Faseel-e-Jaan Se Aagay, and Chaudhry – The Martyr.

== Filmography ==
=== Films ===
Year	Title	Role	Director	Writer	Notes
2016	8969	Shahzaib	Yes	Yes	
2022	Chaudhry – The Martyr	–	Yes		

=== Television series ===
Year	Serial	Role	Director	Writer	Network	Notes
1991	Shakhsar	Tauseef			PTV	
1994	Haala	Maqsood			PTV	
1999	Thori Si Zindagi	Faris	Yes		PTV	On AIDS
2003	Ik Kasak Baqi Hei Abhi		Yes		PTV	
2010	Faseel-e-Jaan Se Aagay	–	Yes		PTV	
2012	Shikwa Na Shikayat	–	Yes	Yes	Express Entertainment	
2014	Za Pakhtoon Yum	Adam Khan	Yes		AVT Khyber	
2015	Meray Dil Meray Musafir	–	Yes		TV One	
2016	Kaisi Khushi Le Ke Aya Chand	–	Yes	Yes	A-Plus Entertainment	
2018	Baandi	Meeru's father			Hum TV	Supporting role
2019	Ehd-e-Wafa	Malik Yar Muhammad			Hum TV	Supporting role
2019	Meer Abru	Ghazanfer			Hum TV	Supporting role
2020	Raqs-e-Bismil	Tauqeer			Hum TV	Supporting role
2022	Pinjra	Adeel			ARY Digital	Supporting role
2023	Adan	–	Yes		Aan TV	
