= Thomas B. Fitzpatrick =

American dermatologist (1919–2003)

Thomas Bernard Fitzpatrick
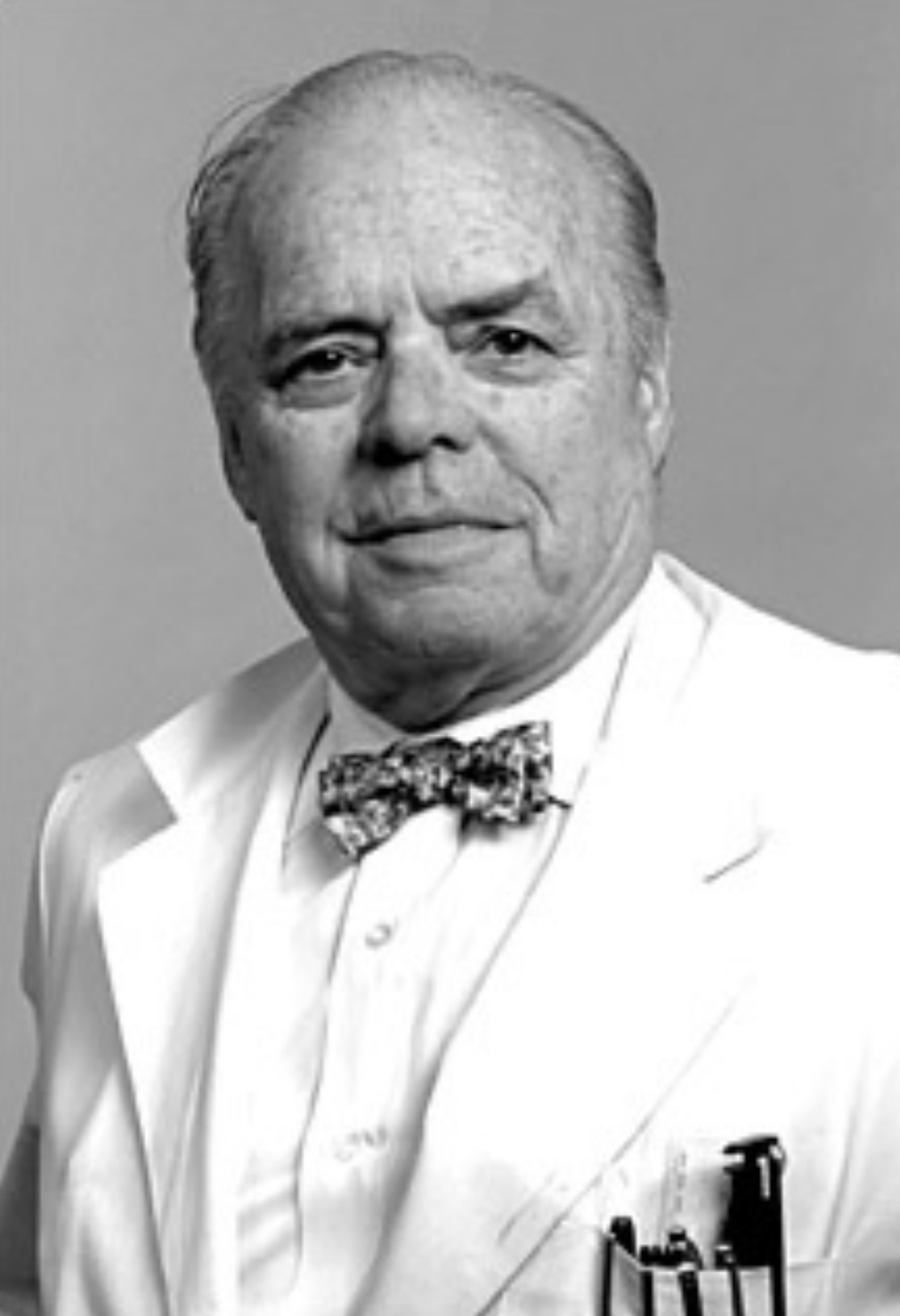
- Born: December 19, 1919; Madison, Wisconsin
- Died: August 16, 2003 (aged 83); Lexington, Massachusetts
- Occupation: Dermatologist
- Years active: 1952–1987
- Known for: research on melanoma and UV exposure
- Notable work: The Validity and Practicality of Sun-Reactive Skin Types I Through VI

Thomas Bernard Fitzpatrick (December 19, 1919 – August 16, 2003) was an American dermatologist. He was chairman of the Department of Dermatology at Harvard Medical School and chief of the Massachusetts General Hospital Dermatology Service from 1959 to 1987. He has been described as "the father of modern academic dermatology" and as "the most influential dermatologist of the last 100 years", in part because he trained so many of the leaders in the field.

== Early life, education, and career ==
Fitzpatrick was born in Madison, Wisconsin, on December 19, 1919, the son of the lumberman Joseph Fitzpatrick (1885–1953) and Grace D. Fitzpatrick (née Lawrence, 1885–1967). He earned a bachelor's degree from the University of Wisconsin. He then received an M.D. degree from Harvard Medical School, where he became interested in the relatively new specialty of dermatology. After an internship at Boston City Hospital he went to the University of Minnesota for a Ph.D. in pathology. After two years at the Army Chemical Center during World War II, he trained in clinical dermatology at the University of Michigan and the Mayo Clinic.

At the age of 32, fresh out of training, he became Professor and Chair of Dermatology at the University of Oregon. In 1959, still only 39, he was named chair of the Dermatology Department at Harvard Medical School, the youngest professor and chair at Harvard.

== Research ==
He conducted early research on melanoma. In 1966 he and dermatopathologist Wallace H. Clark Jr., together with John Raker and Martin C. Mihm Jr., created the first Pigmented Lesion Clinic in the United States at Massachusetts General Hospital. Clark's studies at that clinic resulted in the Clark's level system, which uses the microscopic appearance of a melanoma to predict its clinical course and prognosis. Fitzpatrick's group also produced the first systematic study of the early warning signs of melanoma.

He investigated the role of sunlight and especially sunburn in the development of melanoma. In 1975, he devised the Fitzpatrick scale of skin phototypes, which described the common tanning behaviour of various skin types. He worked with other researchers and with industry to develop and test some of the first modern sunscreens. He was a developer of PUVA therapy for the treatment of psoriasis and other skin disorders. Basic science discoveries included the discovery of the melanosome and of human tyrosinase.

He created and edited the first major clinical reference book in the field, Fitzpatrick's Dermatology in General Medicine, currently in its 8th edition.

== Personal life ==
His hobby was collecting quotations, of which he had so many that he co-edited a column in The Boston Globe called "Reflection for the Day" in partnership with his wife of nearly 60 years, Beatrice Devaney Fitzpatrick. They had five children. He died August 16, 2003, at his home in Lexington, Massachusetts.
