= Human skin color =

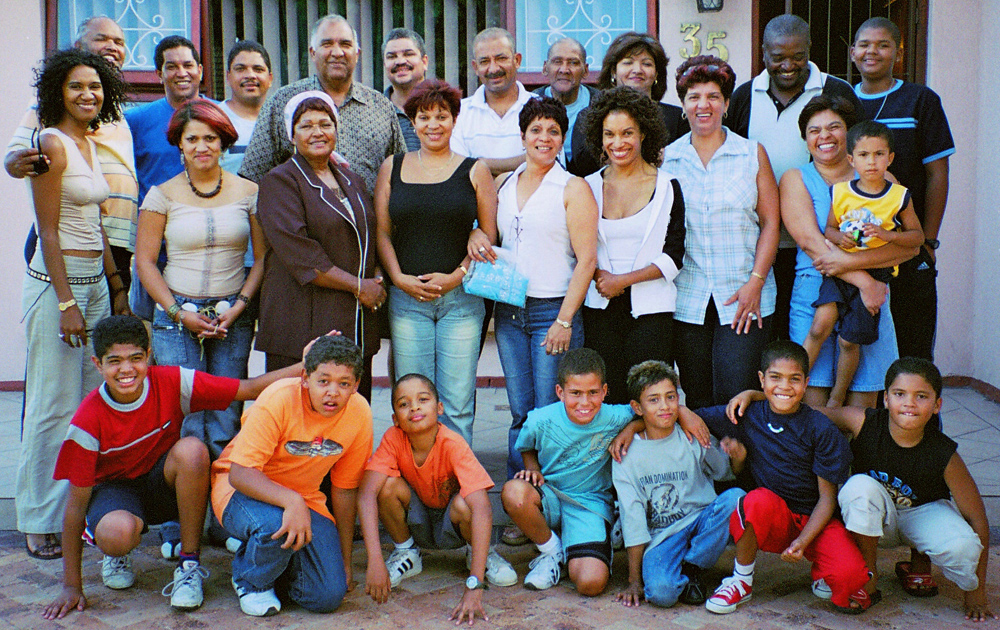
Coloured (Afrikaans: Kleurlinge or Bruinmense) extended family from South Africa showing some spectrum of human skin coloration

Human skin color, also known as skin tone, ranges from the darkest brown to the lightest hues. Differences in skin color among individuals are caused by variation in pigmentation, which is largely due to genetics (inherited from one's biological parents), and, in adults in particular, to exposure to the sun, disorders, or some combination thereof. Differences across populations evolved through natural selection and sexual selection, because of social norms and differences in environment, as well as regulation of the biochemical effects of ultraviolet radiation penetrating the skin.

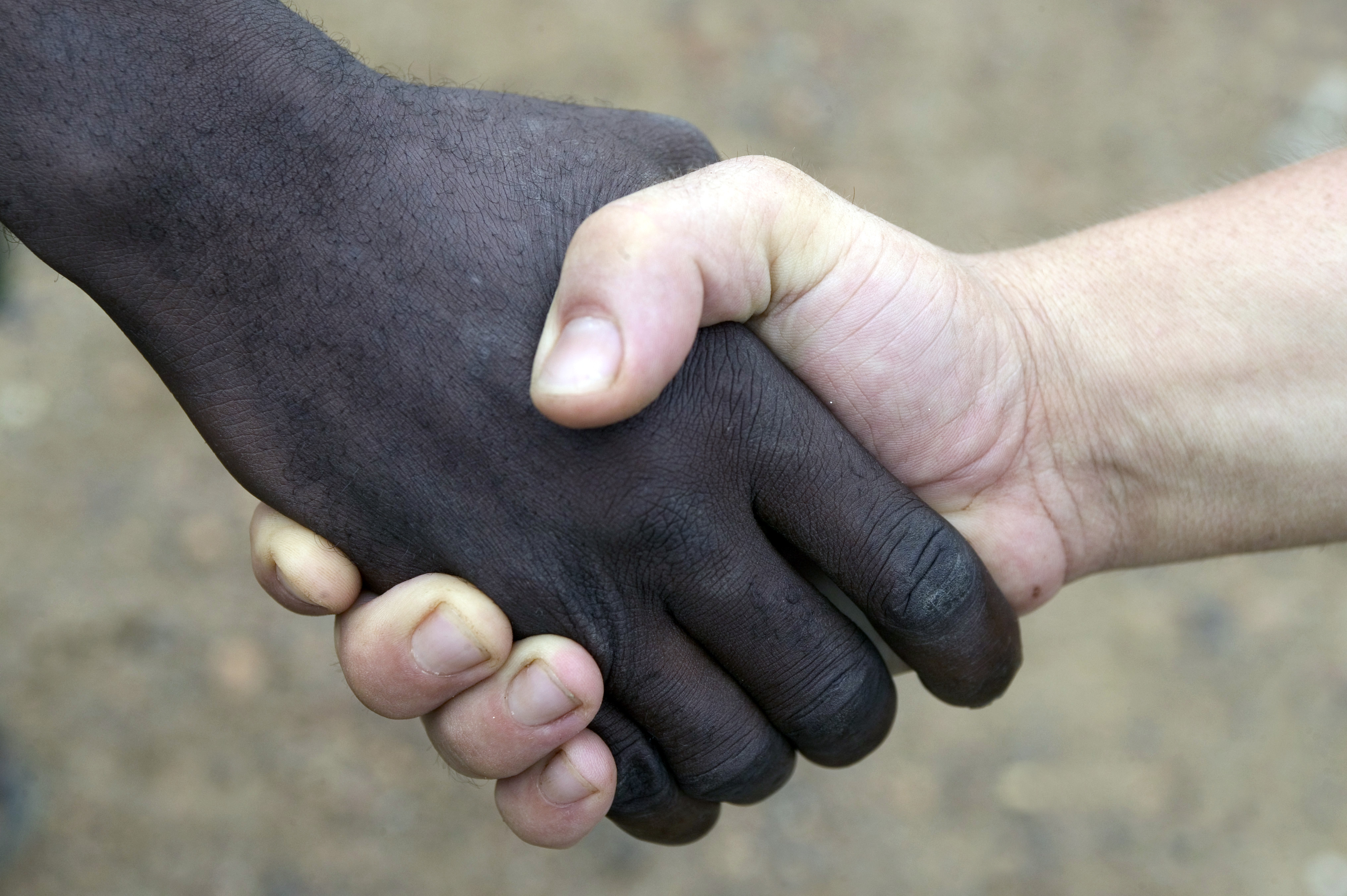
A dark-skinned person and a light-skinned person shake hands.

Human skin color is influenced greatly by the amount of the pigment melanin present. Melanin is produced within the skin in cells called melanocytes; it is the main determinant of the skin color of darker-skin humans. The skin color of people with light skin is determined mainly by the bluish-white connective tissue under the dermis and by the hemoglobin circulating in the veins of the dermis. The red color underlying the skin becomes more visible, especially in the face, when, as a consequence of physical exercise, sexual arousal, or the stimulation of the nervous system (e.g. due to anger or embarrassment), arterioles dilate. Color is not entirely uniform across an individual's skin; for example, the skin of the palm and the soles of the feet is paler than most other skin; this is more noticeable in darker-skinned people.

There is a direct correlation between the geographic distribution of ultraviolet radiation (UVR) and the distribution of indigenous skin pigmentation around the world. Areas that receive higher amounts of UVR, generally located closer to the equator or at higher altitudes, tend to have darker-skinned populations. Areas that are far from the tropics and closer to the poles have lower intensity of UVR, which is reflected in lighter-skinned populations. By the time modern Homo sapiens evolved, all humans were dark-skinned. Some researchers suggest that human populations over the past 50,000 years have changed from dark-skinned to light-skinned and that such major changes in pigmentation may have happened in as little as 100 generations (≈2,500 years) through selective sweeps. Natural skin color can also darken as a result of tanning due to exposure to sunlight. The leading theory is that skin color adapts to intense sunlight irradiation to provide partial protection against the ultraviolet fraction that produces damage and thus mutations in the DNA of the skin cells.

The social significance of differences in skin color has varied across cultures and over time, as demonstrated with regard to social status and discrimination.

== Melanin and genes ==
One possible structure of eumelanin

Melanin is produced by cells called melanocytes in a process called melanogenesis. Melanin is made within small membrane–bound packages called melanosomes. As they become full of melanin, they move into the slender arms of melanocytes, from where they are transferred to the keratinocytes. Under normal conditions, melanosomes cover the upper part of the keratinocytes and protect them from genetic damage. One melanocyte supplies melanin to thirty-six keratinocytes according to signals from the keratinocytes. These keratinocytes regulate melanin production and replication of melanocytes. People have different skin colors mainly because their melanocytes produce different amount and kinds of melanin.

The genetic mechanism behind human skin color is mainly regulated by the enzyme tyrosinase, which creates the color of the skin, eyes, and hair shades. Differences in skin color are also attributed to differences in size and distribution of melanosomes in the skin. Melanocytes produce two types of melanin. The most common form of biological melanin is eumelanin, a brown-black polymer of dihydroxyindole carboxylic acids, and their reduced forms. Most are derived from the amino acid tyrosine. Eumelanin is found in hair, areola, and skin, and the hair colors gray, black, blond, and brown. In humans, it is more abundant in people with dark skin. Pheomelanin, a pink to red hue is found in particularly large quantities in red hair, the lips, nipples, glans of the penis, and vagina.

Both the amount and type of melanin produced is controlled by a number of genes that operate under incomplete dominance. One copy of each of the various genes is inherited from each parent. Each gene can come in several alleles, resulting in the great variety of human skin tones. Melanin controls the amount of ultraviolet (UV) radiation from the sun that penetrates the skin by absorption. While UV radiation can assist in the production of vitamin D, excessive exposure to UV can damage health.

== Evolution of skin color ==
=== Time scale of skin color evolution ===
Loss of body hair in Homo links to the thermoregulation through perspiration heat dissipation required for activity in hot open environments and endurance running. Humans as primates have a particular need for this thermoregulation since unlike other mammals they lack a carotid rete that allows precooling of blood to the brain, an organ extremely sensitive to changes in body temperature. Given endurance running and its needs for thermoregulation arose with H. erectus, this links hairlessness with the origin of H. erectus about 2 million years ago.

As hominids gradually lost their fur between 4 million and 1.2 million years ago, to allow for better cooling through sweating, their naked skin was exposed to sunlight. In the tropics, natural selection favoured dark-skinned human populations as high levels of skin pigmentation protected against the harmful effects of sunlight. Indigenous populations' skin reflectance (the amount of sunlight the skin reflects) and the actual UV radiation in a particular geographic area is highly inversely correlated, which supports this idea. Genetic evidence also supports this notion, demonstrating that around 1.2 million years ago there was a strong evolutionary pressure which acted on the development of dark skin pigmentation in early members of the genus Homo. Hairlessness exposes folate circulating subcutaneously and in the dermis to degradation from UV-radiation. The effect of sunlight on folic acid levels has been crucial in the development of dark skin and favored the emergence of skin pigmentation in order to protect from folate depletion due to the increased exposure to sunlight.

In 2017, a study showed that both dark and light pigmentation alleles arose before the origin of modern humans, with the older version of the variants in many cases being associated with lighter skin. The earliest hominid ancestors of humans most likely had pale non-pigmented skin covered with dark black hair, like the chimpanzee and other great apes.

With the evolution of hairless skin, abundant sweat glands, and skin rich in melanin, early humans could walk, run, and forage for food for long periods of time under the hot sun without brain damage due to overheating, giving them an evolutionary advantage over other species. Research on the MC1R alleles using assumptions about past population size and an absence of population bottlenecks suggests the allele for dark skin present in modern Africans arose at least by 1.2 million years ago.

This was the genotype inherited by anatomically modern humans, but retained only by part of the extant populations, thus forming an aspect of human genetic variation. About 100,000–70,000 years ago, some anatomically modern humans (Homo sapiens) began to migrate away from the tropics to the north where they were exposed to less intense sunlight. This was possibly in part due to the need for greater use of clothing to protect against the colder climate. Under these conditions, there was less photodestruction of folate and so the evolutionary pressure working against the survival of lighter-skinned gene variants was reduced. In addition, lighter skin is able to generate more vitamin D (cholecalciferol) than darker skin, so it would have represented a health benefit in reduced sunlight if there were limited sources of vitamin D. Hence the leading hypothesis for the evolution of human skin color proposes that:

1. From the origin of hairlessness and exposure to UV-radiation to less than 100,000 years ago, archaic humans, including archaic Homo sapiens, were dark-skinned.
2. As some Homo sapiens populations began to migrate, the evolutionary constraint keeping skin dark decreased proportionally to the distance north a population migrated, resulting in a range of skin tones within northern populations, although the bulk of humans remained dark-skinned.
3. At some point, some northern populations experienced positive selection for lighter skin due to the increased production of vitamin D from sunlight and the genes for darker skin disappeared from these populations.
4. Subsequent migrations into different UV environments and admixture between populations have resulted in the varied range of skin pigmentations we see today.

The genetic mutations leading to light skin, though partially different among East Asians and Western Europeans, suggest the two groups experienced a similar selective pressure after settlement in northern latitudes.

The theory is partially supported by a study into the SLC24A5 gene which found that the allele associated with light skin in Europe "determined […] that 18,000 years had passed since the light-skin allele was fixed in Europeans" but may have originated as recently as 12,000–6,000 years ago "given the imprecision of method", which is in line with the earliest evidence of farming. Paleolithic Cro-Magnon groups, as well as Early Holocene Western and central European hunter-gatherers (Western Hunter Gatherers) have been suggested to have been dark skinned based on DNA analysis, with a number of the most prominent light-skin tone gene variants found in modern Europeans being introduced by Anatolian Neolithic Farmers that migrated into Europe beginning around 9,000 years ago, with selection pressure for lighter skin intensifying from the Neolithic period onwards.

Research by Nina Jablonski suggests that an estimated time of about 10,000 to 20,000 years is enough for human populations to achieve optimal skin pigmentation in a particular geographic area but that development of ideal skin coloration may happen faster if the evolutionary pressure is stronger, even in as little as 100 generations. The length of time is also affected by cultural practices such as food intake, clothing, body coverings, and shelter usage, which can alter the ways in which the environment affects populations.

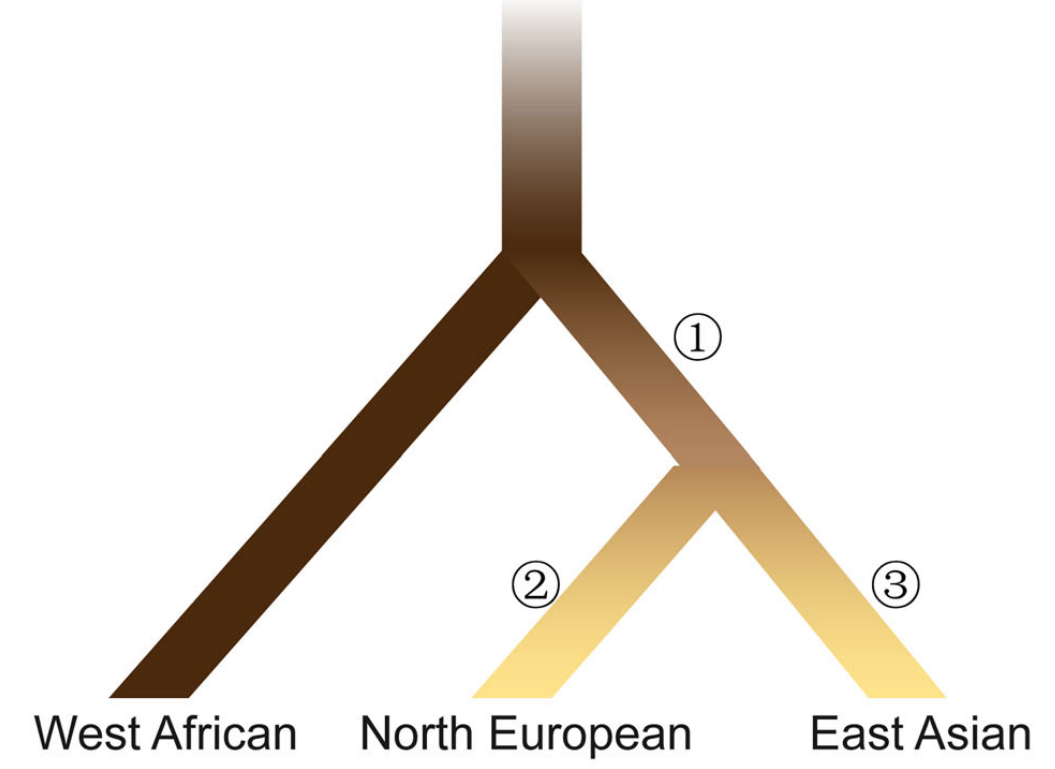
Evolutionary model of human pigmentation in three continental populations. The colors of the branches roughly indicate the generalized skin pigmentation level of these populations.

Population and admixture studies suggest a three-way model for the evolution of human skin color, with dark skin evolving in early Homo sapiens in Africa and light skin evolving only recently after modern humans had expanded out of Africa. For the most part, the evolution of light skin has followed different genetic paths in Western and Eastern Eurasian populations; however, some mutations associated with lighter skin have estimated origin dates after humans spread out of Africa but before the divergence of the two lineages.

According to Crawford et al. (2017), most of the genetic variants associated with light and dark pigmentation in African populations appear to have originated more than 300,000 years ago. African, South Asian and Australo-Melanesian populations also carry derived alleles for dark skin pigmentation that are not found in Europeans or East Asians. Huang et al. 2021 found the existence of "selective pressure on light pigmentation in the ancestral population of Europeans and East Asians", prior to their divergence from each other. Skin pigmentation was also found to be affected by directional selection towards darker skin among Africans, as well as lighter skin among Eurasians. Crawford et al. (2017) similarly found evidence for selection towards light pigmentation prior to the divergence of West Eurasians and East Asians.

=== Functional considerations ===
Elias et al. in 2010 showed a superior barrier function in darkly pigmented skin. Most protective functions of the skin, including the permeability barrier and the antimicrobial barrier, reside in the stratum corneum and the researchers surmise that the stratum corneum has undergone the most genetic change since the loss of human body hair. Natural selection would have favored mutations that protect this essential barrier; one such protective adaptation is the pigmentation of interfollicular epidermis, because it improves barrier function as compared to non-pigmented skin.

The authors argue that lack of significant differences between modern light-skinned and dark-skinned populations in vitamin D deficiency, early death from UV-induced cancers and birth defects – as well as instances of light and dark populations living side-by-side in areas with similar UV – suggest the standard model is insufficient to explain the strong selection drive for pigmented skin. Jablonski rejects this theory on the grounds that the human tanning response is driven by UV-B exposure, not xeric stress, and that the positive selection for vitamin D production is "well-established".

== Genetics ==
To some extent, skin color is determined independently of eye and hair color, as can be seen from variation in skin coloration in human populations.

For skin color, heritability is very high, even though it can be modified by exposure to sunlight.

A recent systematic study found 169 genes involved in human skin coloration. Most of the genes were involved in melanosome biogenesis, endosomal transport, and gene regulation. Notably, the function of these genes was verified in tissue culture experiments using CRISPR-Cas9 knockouts, showing that these genes are indeed involved in melanin production.

=== Dark skin ===
All modern humans share a common ancestor who lived around 200,000 years ago in Africa. Comparisons between known skin pigmentation genes in chimpanzees and modern Africans show that dark skin evolved along with the loss of body hair about 1.2 million years ago and that this common ancestor had dark skin. Investigations into dark-skinned populations in South Asia and Melanesia indicate that skin pigmentation in these populations is due to the preservation of this ancestral state and not due to new variations on a previously lightened population.

==== MC1R ====
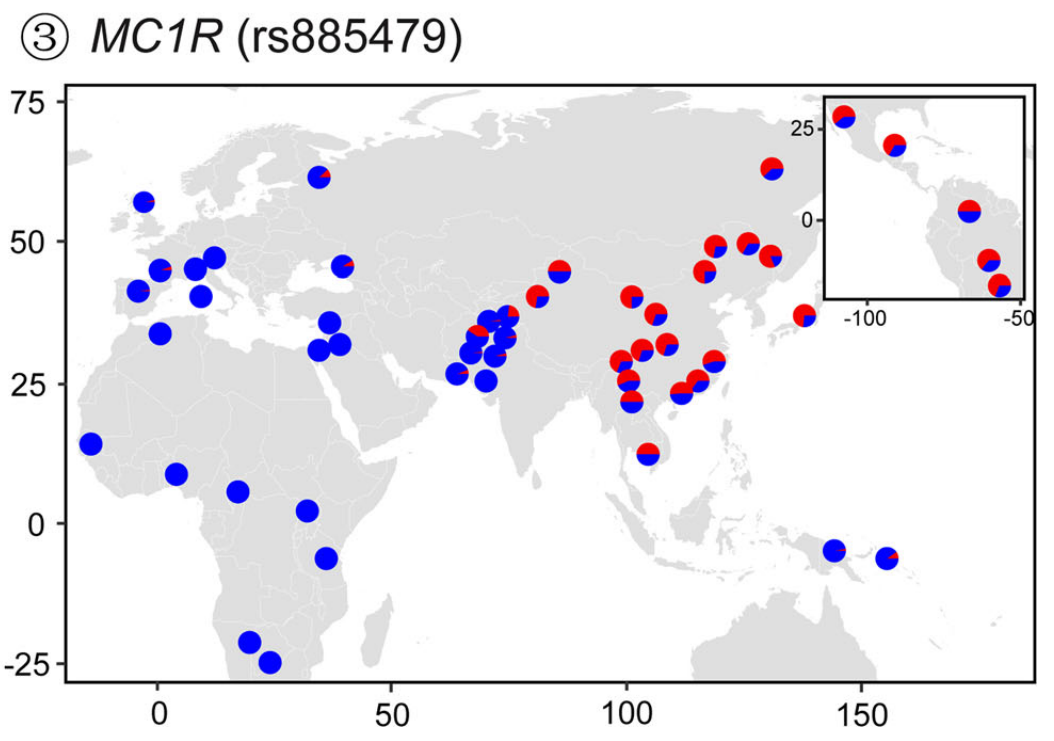
MC1R (rs885479)

The melanocortin 1 receptor (MC1R) gene is primarily responsible for determining whether pheomelanin and eumelanin are produced in the human body. Research shows at least 10 differences in MC1R between African and chimpanzee samples and that the gene has probably undergone a strong positive selection (a selective sweep) in early Hominins around 1.2 million years ago. This is consistent with positive selection for the high-eumelanin phenotype seen in Africa and other environments with high UV exposure.

=== Light skin ===
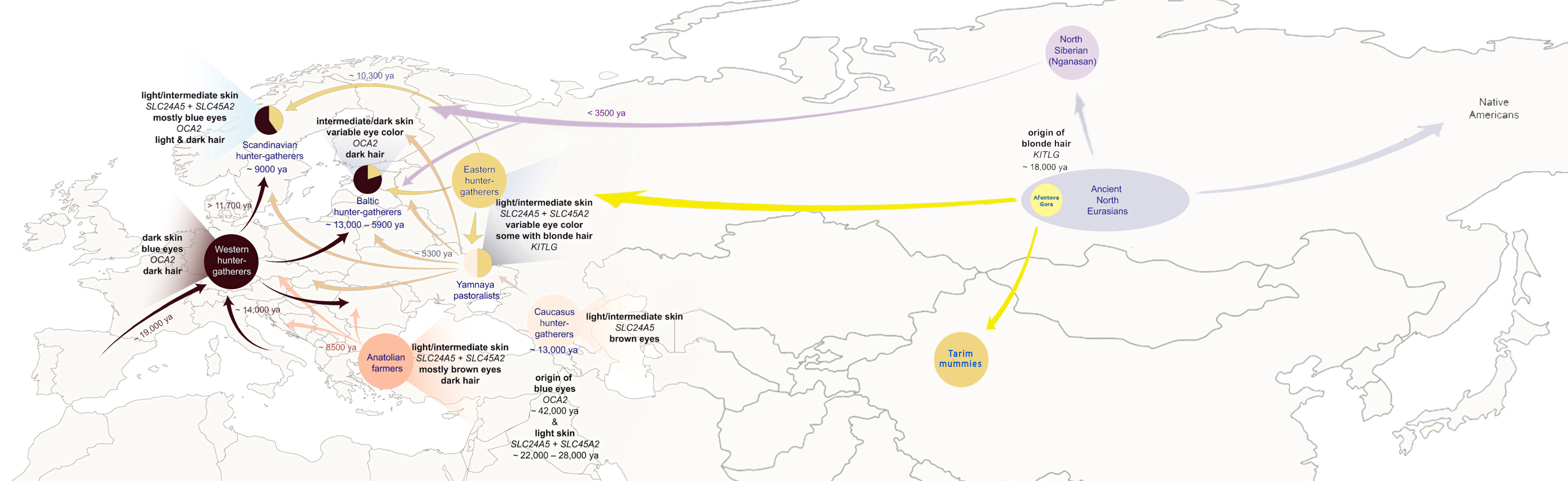
History of human skin pigmentation in Eurasia based on genetics

For the most part, the evolution of light skin has followed different genetic paths in European and East Asian populations.

==== KITLG ====
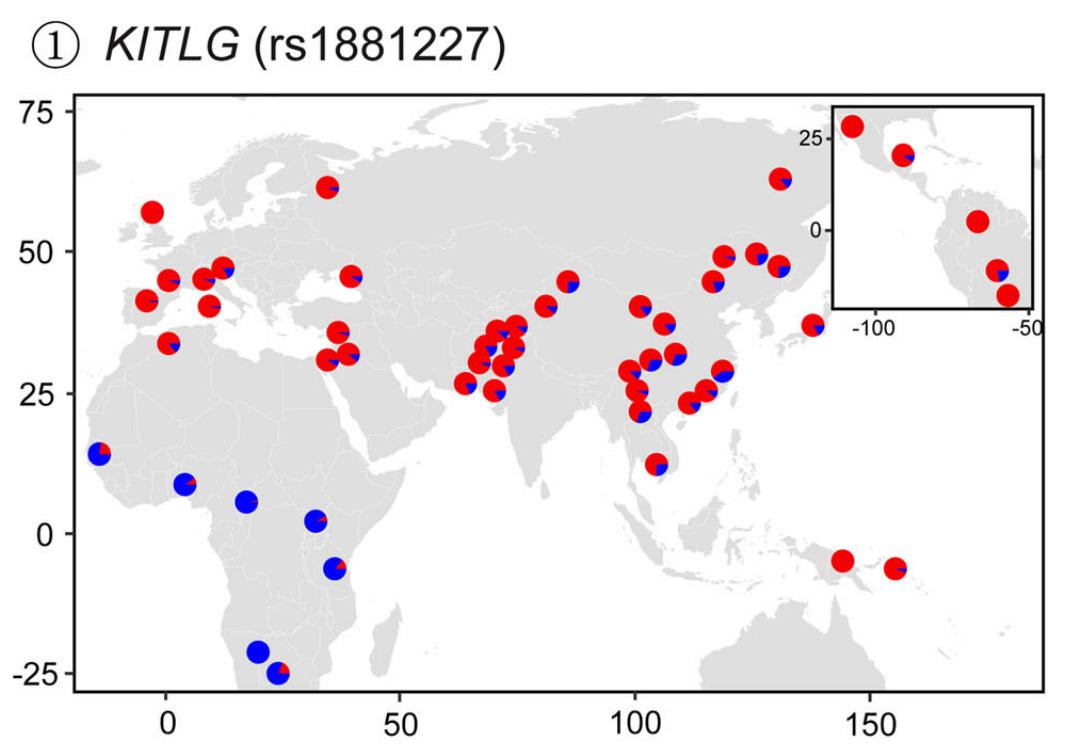
KITLG (rs1881227)

The KIT ligand (KITLG) gene is involved in the permanent survival, proliferation and migration of melanocytes. A mutation in this gene, A326G (rs642742), has been positively associated with variations of skin color in African-Americans of mixed West African and European descent and is estimated to account for 15–20% of the melanin difference between African and European populations and occurs in over 80% of European and Asian samples, compared with less than 10% in African samples.

==== ASIP ====
Studies have found two alleles in the vicinity of ASIP Agouti signalling peptide are associated with skin color variation in humans. One, rs2424984, has been identified as an indicator of skin reflectance in a forensics analysis of human phenotypes across Caucasian, African-American, South Asian, East Asian, Hispanic and Native American populations and is about three times more common in non-African populations than in Africa. The other allele, 8188G (rs6058017) is significantly associated with skin color variation in African-Americans and the ancestral version occurs in only 12% of European and 28% of East Asian samples compared with 80% of West African samples.

==== Europe ====
A number of genes have been positively associated with the skin pigmentation difference between European and non-European populations. Mutations in SLC24A5 and SLC45A2 are believed to account for the bulk of this variation and show very strong signs of selection. A variation in TYR has also been identified as a contributor.

Research indicates the selection for the light-skin alleles of these genes in Europeans is comparatively recent, having occurred later than 20,000 years ago and perhaps as recently as 12,000 to 6,000 years ago. In the 1970s, Luca Cavalli-Sforza suggested that the selective sweep that rendered light skin ubiquitous in Europe might be correlated with the advent of farming and thus have taken place only around 6,000 years ago; This scenario found support in a 2014 analysis of Mesolithic (7,000 years old) hunter-gatherer DNA from La Braña, Spain, which showed a version of these genes not corresponding with light skin color.

In 2015, researchers analysed for light skin genes in the DNA of 94 ancient skeletons ranging from 8,000 to 3,000 years old from Europe and Russia. They found c. 8,000-year-old hunter-gatherers in Spain, Luxembourg, and Hungary were dark skinned while similarly aged hunter gatherers in Sweden were light skinned (having predominately derived alleles of SLC24A5, SLC45A2 and also HERC2/OCA2). Neolithic farmers entering Europe at around the same time were intermediate, being nearly fixed for the derived SLC24A5 variant but only having the derived SLC45A2 allele in low frequencies. The SLC24A5 variant spread very rapidly throughout central and southern Europe from about 8,000 years ago, whereas the light skin variant of SLC45A2 spread throughout Europe after 5,800 years ago.

Some authors have expressed caution regarding the skin pigmentation predictions. According to Ju et al. (2021), in a study addressing 40,000 years of modern human history, stated:

Relatively dark skin pigmentation in Early Upper Paleolithic Europe would be consistent with those populations being relatively poorly adapted to high-latitude conditions as a result of having recently migrated from lower latitudes. On the other hand, although we have shown that these populations carried few of the light pigmentation alleles that are segregating in present-day Europe, they may have carried different alleles that we cannot now detect.

===== SLC24A5 =====
Solute carrier family 24 member 5 (SLC24A5) regulates calcium in melanocytes and is important in the process of melanogenesis. The SLC24A5 gene's derived Ala111Thr allele (rs1426654) has been shown to be a major factor in light skin pigmentation and is common in Western Eurasia. Recent studies have found that the variant represents as much as 25–40% of the average skin tone difference between Europeans and West Africans. This derived allele is a reliable predictor of phenotype across a range of populations. It has been the subject of recent selection in Western Eurasia, and is fixed in European populations.

===== SLC45A2 =====
Solute carrier family 45 member 2 (SLC45A2 or MATP) aids in the transport and processing of tyrosine, a precursor to melanin. It has also been shown to be one of the significant components of the skin color of modern Europeans through its Phe374Leu (rs16891982) allele that has been directly correlated with skin color variation across a range of populations. This variation is ubiquitous in European populations but extremely rare elsewhere and shows strong signs of selection.

===== TYR =====
The TYR gene encodes the enzyme tyrosinase, which is involved in the production of melanin from tyrosine. It has an allele, Ser192Tyr (rs1042602), found solely in 40–50% of Europeans and linked to light-colored skin in studies of South Asian and African-American populations.

==== East Asia ====
A number of genes known to affect skin color have alleles that show signs of positive selection in East Asian populations. Of these, only OCA2 has been directly related to skin color measurements, while DCT, MC1R and ATRN are marked as candidate genes for future study.

===== OCA2 =====
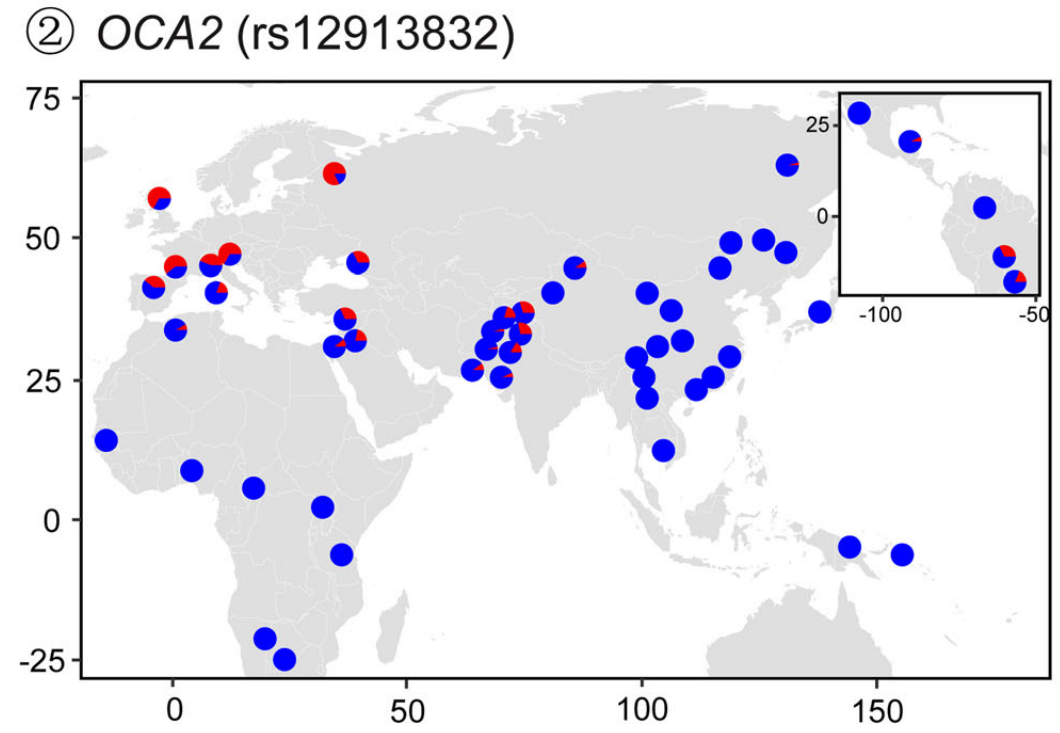
OCA2 (rs12913832)

Oculocutaneous albinism II (OCA2) assists in the regulation of pH in melanocytes. The OCA2 gene's derived His615Arg (rs1800414) allele has been shown to account for about 8% of the skin tone difference between African and East Asian populations in studies of an East Asian population living in Toronto and a Chinese Han population. This variant is essentially restricted to East Asia, with highest frequencies in Eastern East Asia (49–63%), midrange frequencies in Southeast Asia, and the lowest frequencies in Western China and some Eastern European populations.

===== Candidate genes =====
A number of studies have found genes linked to human skin pigmentation that have alleles with statistically significant frequencies in Chinese and East Asian populations. While not linked to measurements of skin tone variation directly, dopachrome tautomerase (DCT or TYRP2 rs2031526), melanocortin 1 receptor (MC1R) Arg163Gln (rs885479) and attractin (ATRN) have been indicated as potential contributors to the evolution of light skin in East Asian populations.

=== Tanning response ===
Tanning response in humans is controlled by a variety of genes. MC1R variants Arg151Sys (rs1805007), Arg160Trp (rs1805008), Asp294Sys (rs1805009), Val60Leu (rs1805005) and Val92Met (rs2228479) have been associated with reduced tanning response in European and/or East Asian populations. These alleles show no signs of positive selection and only occur in relatively small numbers, reaching a peak in Europe with around 28% of the population having at least one allele of one of the variations. A study of self-reported tanning ability and skin type in American non-Hispanic Caucasians found that SLC24A5 Phe374Leu is significantly associated with reduced tanning ability and also associated TYR Arg402Gln (rs1126809), OCA2 Arg305Trp (rs1800401) and a 2-SNP haplotype in ASIP (rs4911414 and rs1015362) to skin type variation within a "fair/medium/olive" context.

=== Albinism ===
Oculocutaneous albinism (OCA) is a lack of pigment in the eyes, skin and sometimes hair that occurs in a very small fraction of the population. The four known types of OCA are caused by mutations in the TYR, OCA2, TYRP1, and SLC45A2 genes.

== Age ==
In hominids, the parts of the body not covered with hair, like the face and the back of the hands, start out pale in infants and turn darker as the skin is exposed to more sun. All human babies are born pale, regardless of what their adult color will be. In humans, melanin production does not peak until after puberty.

The skin of children becomes darker as they go through puberty and experience the effects of sex hormones. This darkening is especially noticeable in the skin of the nipples, the areola of the nipples, the labia majora in females, and the scrotum in males. In some people, the armpits become slightly darker during puberty. The interaction of genetic, hormonal, and environmental factors on skin coloration with age is still not adequately understood, but it is known that men are at their darkest baseline skin color around the age of 30, without considering the effects of tanning.

Human skin color fades with age. Humans over the age of thirty experience a decrease in melanin-producing cells by about 10% to 20% per decade as melanocyte stem cells gradually die. The skin of face and hands has about twice the amount of pigment cells as unexposed areas of the body, as chronic exposure to the sun continues to stimulate melanocytes. The blotchy appearance of skin color in the face and hands of older people is due to the uneven distribution of pigment cells and to changes in the interaction between melanocytes and keratinocytes.

== Sexual dimorphism ==
Women from some darker-skinned populations may have lighter skin than men so their bodies can absorb more vitamin D during pregnancy, which improves calcium absorption. In light skinned populations, namely those of European descent, multiple different studies using up-to-date and robust statistical methods find that women have similar skin color to men. At least one study of Spanish individuals actually found that men tend to have lighter skin pigmentation than women.

It is unknown why skin color is sexually dimorphic in some populations. Prior to menopause, women may have darker skin than men due to the female sex hormone estrogen increasing skin pigmentation. To the extent that women's skin is darker than men's results in lower rates of skin cancer in women than men.

In populations where women have lighter skin than men, it has been hypothesized that the requirement for high amounts of calcium during pregnancy and lactation may be related to the dimorphism. Breastfeeding newborns, whose skeletons are growing, require high amounts of calcium intake from the mother's milk (about 4 times more than during prenatal development), part of which comes from reserves in the mother's skeleton.

Adequate vitamin D resources are needed to absorb calcium from the diet, and it has been shown that deficiencies of vitamin D and calcium increase the likelihood of various birth defects such as spina bifida and rickets. Natural selection may have led to females with lighter skin than males in some indigenous populations because women must get enough vitamin D and calcium to support the development of fetus and nursing infants and to maintain their own health. However, some authors have cast doubt on the theory that vitamin D synthesis is related to the sexual dimorphism of human skin color in these populations.

The sexes also differ in how their skin color changes over time. Women's pigmentation in certain parts of their body, such as the areola and nipples, changes throughout the menstrual cycle and during pregnancy. Between 50 and 70% of pregnant women will develop the "mask of pregnancy", which refers to the browning and yellowing of the cheeks, upper lips, and forehead that occurs during pregnancy. This is caused by increases in estrogen, and it can also develop in women who take birth control pills or due to hormone replacement therapy.

== Disorders of pigmentation ==
Uneven pigmentation of some sort affects most people, regardless of bioethnic background or skin color. Skin may either appear lighter, or darker than normal, or lack pigmentation at all; there may be blotchy, uneven areas, patches of brown to gray discoloration or freckling. Apart from blood-related conditions such as jaundice, carotenosis, or argyria, skin pigmentation disorders generally occur because the body produces either too much or too little melanin.

=== Depigmentation ===
==== Albinism ====
Some types of albinism affect only the skin and hair, while other types affect the skin, hair and eyes, and in rare cases only the eyes. All of them are caused by different genetic mutations. Albinism is a recessively inherited trait in humans where both pigmented parents may be carriers of the gene and pass it down to their children. Each child has a 25% chance of being albino and a 75% chance of having normally pigmented skin. One common type of albinism is oculocutaneous albinism or OCA, which has many subtypes caused by different genetic mutations. Albinism is a serious problem in areas of high sunlight intensity, leading to extreme sun sensitivity, skin cancer, and eye damage.

Albinism is more common in some parts of the world than in others, but it is estimated that 1 in 70 humans carry the gene for OCA. The most severe type of albinism is OCA1A, which is characterized by complete, lifelong loss of melanin production, other forms of OCA1B, OCA2, OCA3, OCA4, show some form of melanin accumulation and are less severe. The four known types of OCA are caused by mutations in the TYR, OCA2, TYRP1, and SLC45A2 genes.

Albinos often face social and cultural challenges (even threats), as the condition is often a source of ridicule, racism, fear, and violence. Many cultures around the world have developed beliefs regarding people with albinism. Albinos are persecuted in Tanzania by witchdoctors, who use the body parts of albinos as ingredients in rituals and potions, as they are thought to possess magical power.

==== Vitiligo ====
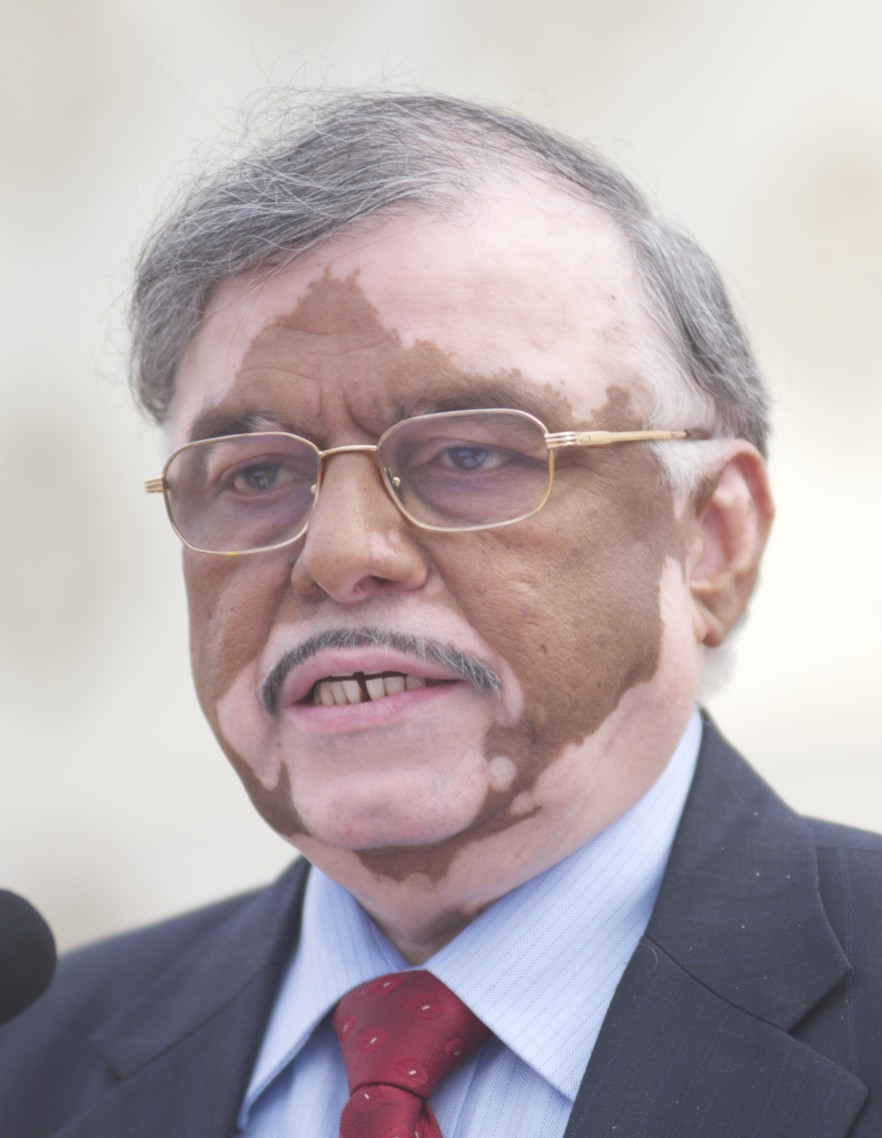
Former Chief Justice of India, P. Sathasivam, has vitiligo.

Vitiligo is a condition that causes depigmentation of sections of skin. It occurs when melanocytes die or are unable to function. The causes of vitiligo are not clear, but research suggests several possibilities, including autoimmune reactions, genetic make-up, oxidative stress, and neural or viral causes. The incidence worldwide is less than 1%. Individuals affected by vitiligo sometimes suffer psychological discomfort because of their appearance.

=== Hyperpigmentation ===
Increased melanin production, also known as hyperpigmentation, can be a few different phenomena:

- Melasma describes the darkening of the skin. A type of melasma is chloasma, the skin discolorations caused by hormones. These hormonal changes are usually the result of pregnancy, birth control pills or estrogen replacement therapy.
- Solar lentigo, also known as "liver spots" or "senile freckles", refers to darkened spots on the skin caused by aging and the sun. These spots are quite common in adults with a long history of unprotected sun exposure.

Aside from sun exposure and hormones, hyperpigmentation can be caused by skin damage, such as remnants of blemishes, wounds or rashes. This is especially true for those with darker skin tones.

The most typical cause of darkened areas of skin, brown spots or areas of discoloration is unprotected sun exposure. Once incorrectly referred to as liver spots, these pigment problems are not connected with the liver.

On lighter to medium skin tones, solar lentigenes emerge as small- to medium-sized brown patches of freckling that can grow and accumulate over time on areas of the body that receive the most unprotected sun exposure, such as the back of the hands, forearms, chest, and face. For those with darker skin colors, these discolorations can appear as patches or areas of ashen-gray skin.

== Exposure to the sun ==
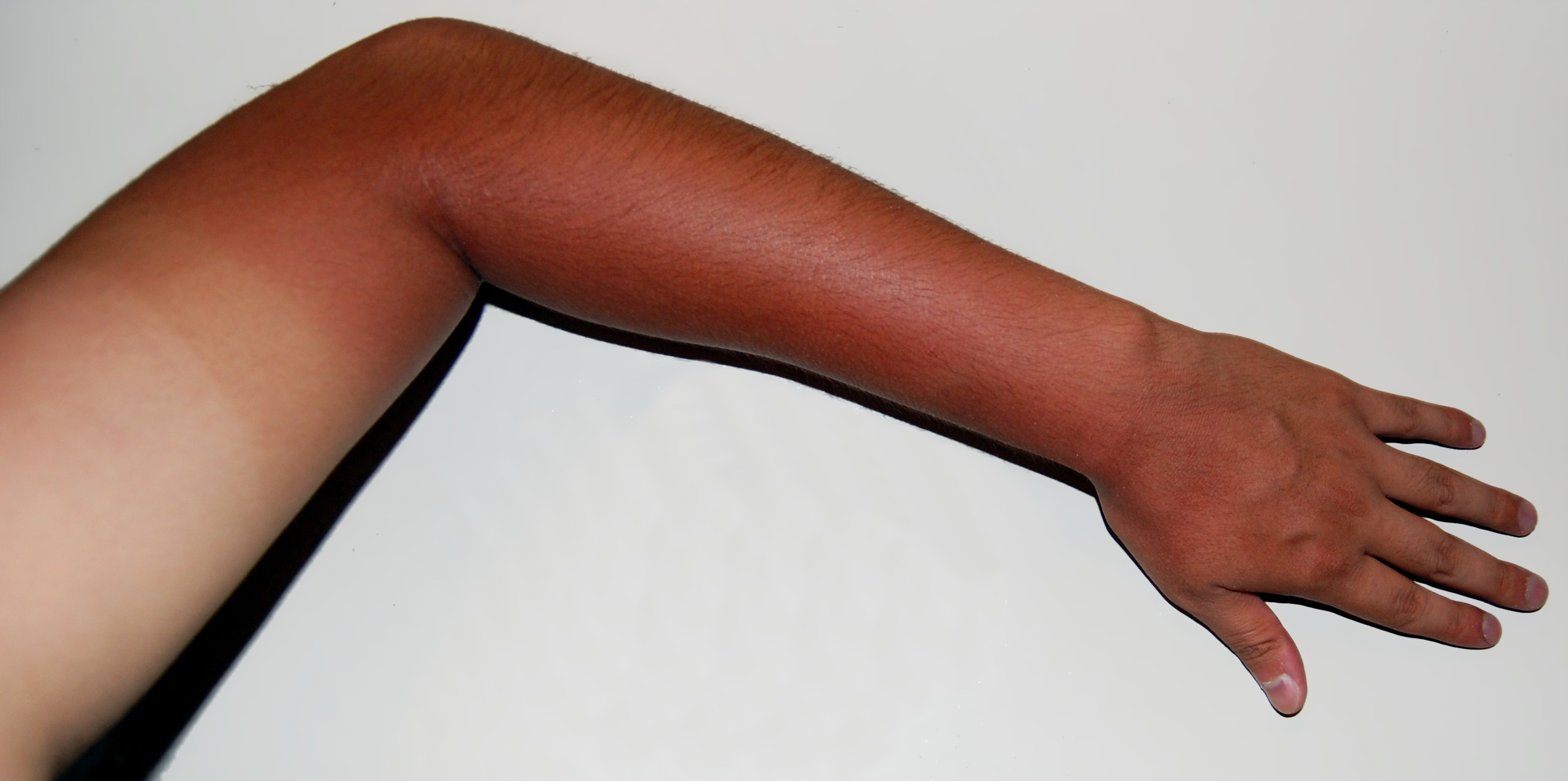
A suntanned arm showing darker skin where it has been exposed. This pattern of tanning is often called a farmer's tan.

Melanin in the skin protects the body by absorbing solar radiation. In general, the more melanin there is in the skin the more solar radiation can be absorbed. Excessive solar radiation causes direct and indirect DNA damage to the skin and the body naturally combats and seeks to repair the damage and protect the skin by creating and releasing further melanin into the skin's cells. With the production of the melanin, the skin color darkens, but can also cause sunburn. The tanning process can also be created by artificial UV radiation.

There are two different mechanisms involved. Firstly, the UVA-radiation creates oxidative stress, which in turn oxidizes existing melanin and leads to rapid darkening of the melanin, also known as IPD (immediate pigment darkening). Secondly, there is an increase in production of melanin known as melanogenesis. Melanogenesis leads to delayed tanning and first becomes visible about 72 hours after exposure. The tan that is created by an increased melanogenesis lasts much longer than the one that is caused by oxidation of existing melanin. Tanning involves not just the increased melanin production in response to UV radiation but the thickening of the top layer of the epidermis, the stratum corneum.

A person's natural skin color affects their reaction to exposure to the sun. Generally, those who start out with darker skin color and more melanin have better abilities to tan. Individuals with very light skin and albinos have no ability to tan. The biggest differences resulting from sun exposure are visible in individuals who start out with moderately pigmented brown skin: the change is dramatically visible as tan lines, where parts of the skin which tanned are delineated from unexposed skin.

Modern lifestyles and mobility have created mismatch between skin color and environment for many individuals. Vitamin D deficiencies and UVR overexposure are concerns for many. It is important for these people individually to adjust their diet and lifestyle according to their skin color, the environment they live in, and the time of year. For practical purposes, such as exposure time for sun tanning, six skin types are distinguished following Fitzpatrick (1975), listed in order of decreasing lightness:

=== Fitzpatrick scale ===
The following list shows the six categories of the Fitzpatrick scale in relation to the 36 categories of the older von Luschan scale:

Type	Also called	Sunburning	Tanning behavior	Von Luschan's chromatic scale
I	Light, pale white	Always	Never	0–6
II	White, fair	Usually	Minimally	7–13
III	Medium white to light brown	Sometimes	Uniformly	14–20
IV	Olive, moderate brown	Rarely	Easily	21–27
V	Brown, dark brown	Very rarely	Very easily	28–34
VI	Very dark brown to black	Never	Rarely	35–36

Dark skin with large concentrations of melanin protects against ultraviolet light and skin cancers; light-skinned people have about a tenfold greater risk of dying from skin cancer, compared with dark-skinned persons, under equal sunlight exposure. Furthermore, UV-A rays from sunlight are believed to interact with folic acid in ways that may damage health. In a number of traditional societies the sun was avoided as much as possible, especially around noon when the ultraviolet radiation in sunlight is at its most intense. Midday was a time when people stayed in the shade and had the main meal followed by a nap, a practice similar to the modern siesta.

== Measurement of skin color ==
While the Fitzpatrick scale was intended as a measurement of UV responsiveness, it has been used as a measure of skin color. Other measures include:

- Von Luschan's chromatic scale
- Monk Skin Tone Scale
- Eumelanin Human Skin Colour Scale

== Geographic variation ==
Approximately 10% of the variance in skin color occurs within regions, and approximately 90% occurs between regions. Because skin color has been under strong selective pressure, similar skin colors can result from convergent adaptation rather than from genetic relatedness; populations with similar pigmentation may be genetically no more similar than other widely separated groups. Furthermore, in some parts of the world where people from different regions have mixed extensively, the connection between skin color and ancestry has substantially weakened. In Brazil, for example, skin color is not closely associated with the percentage of recent African ancestors a person has, as estimated from an analysis of genetic variants differing in frequency among continent groups.

In general, people living close to the equator are highly darkly pigmented, and those living near the poles are generally very lightly pigmented. The rest of humanity shows a high degree of skin color variation between these two extremes, generally correlating with UV exposure. The main exception to this rule is in the New World, where people have only lived for about 10,000 to 15,000 years and show a less pronounced degree of skin pigmentation.

In recent times, humans have become increasingly mobile as a consequence of improved technology, domestication, environmental change, strong curiosity, and risk-taking. Migrations over the last 4000 years, and especially the last 400 years, have been the fastest in human history and have led to many people settling in places far away from their ancestral homelands. This means that skin colors today are not as confined to geographical location as they were previously.

== Social status, colorism and racism ==
Skin colors according to von Luschan's chromatic scale

According to classical scholar Frank Snowden, skin color did not determine social status in ancient Egypt, Greece or Rome. These ancient civilizations viewed relations between the major power and the subordinate state as more significant in a person's status than their skin colors.

Some social groups favor specific skin coloring. The preferred skin tone varies by culture and has varied over time. A number of indigenous African groups, such as the Maasai, associated pale skin with being cursed or caused by evil spirits associated with witchcraft. They would abandon their children born with conditions such as albinism and showed a sexual preference for darker skin.

Many cultures have historically favored lighter skin for women. Before the Industrial Revolution, inhabitants of the continent of Europe preferred pale skin, which they interpreted as a sign of high social status. The poorer classes worked outdoors and got darker skin from exposure to the sun, while the upper class stayed indoors and had light skin. Hence light skin became associated with wealth and high position. Women would put lead-based cosmetics on their skin to whiten their skin tone artificially. However, when not strictly monitored, these cosmetics caused lead poisoning.

Colonization and enslavement was a cause of discrimination due to skin color and racism. Slavery in the Americas led to the perception that lighter-skinned African-Americans were more intelligent and cooperative. Such lighter-skinned individuals had a greater likelihood of receiving preferential treatment from overseers and for opportunities for higher education. The preference for fair skin remained prominent until the end of the Gilded Age, but racial stereotypes about worth and beauty persisted throughout the 20th century.

A preference for fair or lighter skin continues in some countries, including Latin American countries where whites form a minority. In Brazil, a dark-skinned person is more likely to experience discrimination.

Significant exceptions to a preference for lighter skin started to appear in Western culture in the mid-20th century. Though sun-tanned skin was once associated with the sun-exposed manual labor of the lower class, the associations became dramatically reversed during this time – a change usually credited to the trendsetting Frenchwoman Coco Chanel (1883–1971) presenting tanned skin as fashionable, healthy, and luxurious.

Many people within the United States regard tanned skin as both more attractive and healthier than pale or very dark skin. Pale skin has become associated with indoor office-work while tanned skin has become associated with increased leisure time, sportiness and good health that comes with wealth and higher social status. Studies have also emerged indicating that the degree of tanning is directly related to how attractive a young woman is.

=== Skin whitening ===
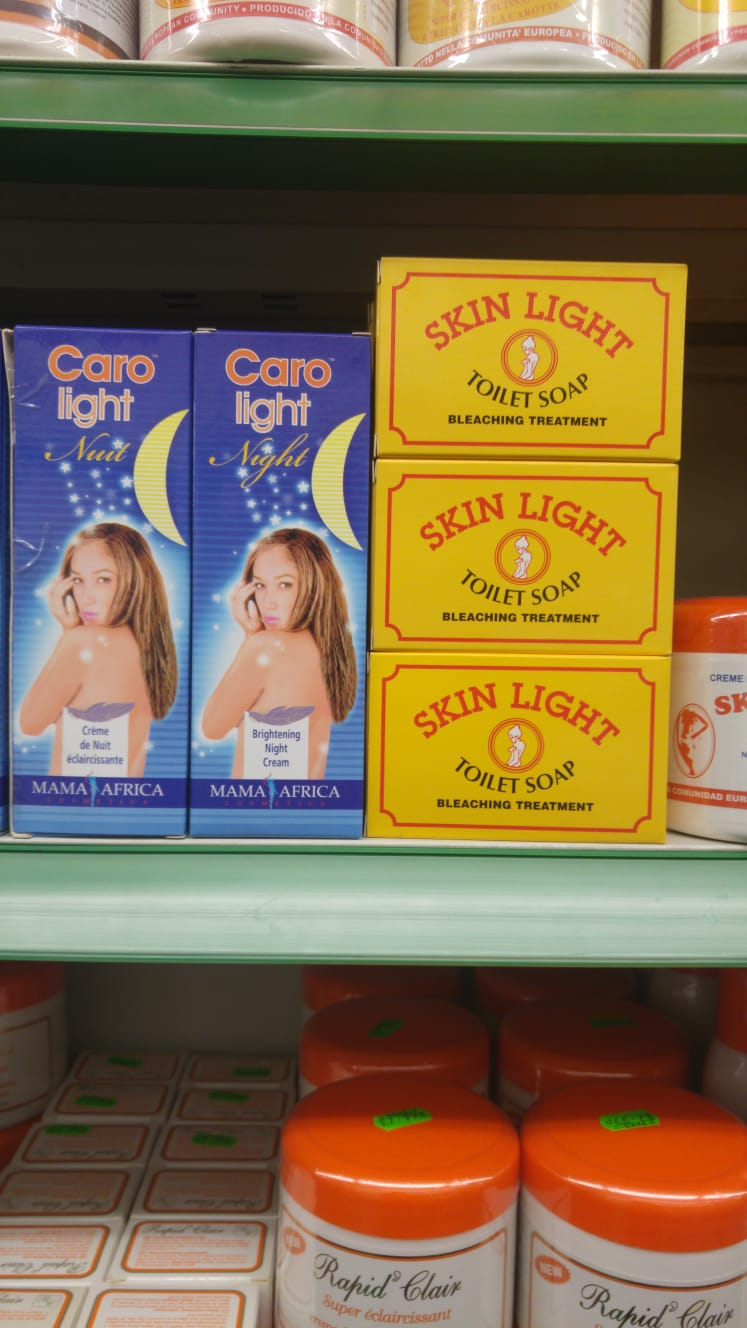
Skin lightening soaps

In South Asia, society regards fair skin as more attractive and associates dark skin with lower class status. This results in a massive market for skin-whitening creams. Fairer skin-tones also correlate to higher caste-status in the Hindu social order – although the system is not based on skin tone. Actors and actresses in Indian cinema tend to have light skin tones, and Indian cinematographers have used graphics and intense lighting to achieve more "desirable" skin tones. Fair skin tones are advertised as an asset in Indian marketing.

In 2013, 77% of Nigerian women, 52% of Senegalese women, and 25% of Malian women were using lightening products. In 2020, Der Spiegel reported that in Ghana, "When You Are Light-Skinned, You Earn More", and that "[s]ome pregnant women take tablets in the hopes that it will lead their child to be born with fair skin. Some apply bleaching lotion [...] to their babies, in the hopes that it will improve their child's chances."

Skin-whitening products have remained popular over time, often due to historical beliefs and perceptions about fair skin. Sales of skin-whitening products across the world grew from $40 billion to $43 billion in 2008. In South and East Asian countries, people have traditionally seen light skin as more attractive, and a preference for lighter skin remains prevalent. In ancient China and Japan, for example, pale skin can be traced back to ancient drawings depicting women and goddesses with fair skin tones. In ancient China, Japan, and Southeast Asia, pale skin was seen as a sign of wealth. Thus skin-whitening cosmetic products are popular in East Asia.

In 2010, four out of ten women surveyed in Hong Kong, Malaysia, the Philippines and South Korea used a skin-whitening cream, and more than 60 companies globally compete for Asia's estimated $18 billion market. Changes in regulations in the cosmetic industry led to skin-care companies introducing harm-free skin lighteners. In Japan, the geisha have a reputation for their white-painted faces, and the appeal of the bihaku (美白), or "beautiful white", ideal leads many Japanese women to avoid any form of tanning.

There are exceptions to this, with Japanese fashion trends such as ganguro emphasizing tanned skin. Skin whitening is also not uncommon in Africa, and several research projects have suggested a general preference for lighter skin in the African-American community. In contrast, one study on men of the Bikosso tribe in Cameroon found no preference for attractiveness of women based on lighter skin color, bringing into question the universality of earlier studies that had exclusively focused on skin-color preferences among non-African populations.

== See also ==
- Afro-textured hair
- Carnation (heraldry)
- Color terminology for race
- Olive skin
- Complexion
- Eye color
- Health effects of sunlight exposure
- Human hair color
- Human physical appearance
- Human skin
- Race (human classification)
