= Tina Lasisi =

American biological anthropologist

- Born: Bulgaria
- Education: University of Cambridge (B.A.); Pennsylvania State University (MS, PhD)
- Scientific career
- Fields: Biological anthropology
- Workplaces: University of Michigan
- Doctoral advisor: Nina Jablonski
- Website: www.tinalasisi.com

Tina Lasisi is a biological anthropologist whose work has focused on the evolution of variation within human hair. Lasisi runs her own research lab at the University of Michigan where she studies diversity of both human hair and skin.

== Early life and education ==
Lasisi was born in Bulgaria; her mother was Bulgarian and her father was Nigerian. Her family moved to the Netherlands when she was 8, and she lived there through the end of high school.

Lasisi earned her Bachelor of Arts in archaeology and anthropology from the University of Cambridge. She enrolled in Pennsylvania State University where she earned both her Master of Science and PhD in biological anthropology. While at Penn State, Lasisi studied under American anthropologist Nina Jablonski. Lasisi is the first Black person to graduate with a PhD in Biological Anthropology from Penn State.

== Career ==
While studying at the University of Cambridge, Lasisi learned how pigmentation acts as protection against UV rays. Lasisi questioned the evolutionary driving forces behind the variety of human hair, finding that existing literature and research was sparse. Determining that most of the research that was available tended to focus on European hair, Lasisi developed an objective methodology to measure and quantify hair diversity. Lasisi set out to develop an "evolutionary narrative to explain skin diversity beyond facile, arbitrary racial lines", citing social pressures on African-American hair and a desire to counterbalance historical biological racism.

Lasisi's research explored the role human hair plays in cooling the human brain, recognizing that curly hair would offer the largest benefit to this process. Lasisi conducted experiments using wigs and controlled temperature conditions, observing that curly hair offered the most protection and reduced the need for sweating, which would in turn save water and electrolytes. Results were published in the American Journal of Physical Anthropology in 2016, and a follow-up study was published in Scientific Reports in 2021.

Lasisi acknowledges the history of pseudoscience used to characterize and classify race, but stresses the need for deeper study into biological variation. In 2021, Lasisi stated: "Despite a general shift away from the use of overt racial terminologies, the underlying racialized frameworks used to describe and understand human variation still remain."

In 2023, Lasisi established her own lab at the University of Michigan. She co-founded Black in Biological Anthropology, which promotes and assists Black biological anthropologists.

== Awards and honors ==
In 2022, Lasisi was awarded the Jon C. Graff, Ph.D. Prize for Excellence in Science Communication

In 2024, Lasisi received the AABA and Leakey Foundation Communication & Outreach Award in Honor of Camilla Smith.
