= In'oya =

In'oya Laboratory
- In'oya Laboratory Logo
- Trade name: In'oya
- Company type: Privately held company
- Industry: Cosmetics
- Founded: 2011 in France
- Founder: Abd Haq Bengeloune & Laïla Mkimer
- Headquarters: France
- Area served: Worldwide
- Products: Skincare for black and brown skin
- Website: inoya-laboratoire.com/en/

In'oya is a French dermo-cosmetics company established in 2011 which centers its research around the specific characteristics of black and brown skin. Based on genetic engineering and its scientific research work around melanogenesis, In'oya Laboratory has discovered the processes that cause the appearance of dark spots on skin of color and has patented a treatment to reduce these spots.

== History ==
In'oya Laboratory was founded in 2011 by Abd Haq Bengeloune, a young biomedical engineer of Senegalese origin working alongside a team of researchers from the CNRS of Saint-Jérôme in Marseille and the INSERM at the School of Pharmacy in La Timone. The goal was to create a dark spot reduction treatment which takes into account the specific genes of skin of color.

In 2013, Crédit Agricole Alpes-Provence Création enters into a fundraising campaign with In’oya Laboratory.

In 2014, In'oya Laboratory develops a technological innovation capable of blocking the TYRP1 gene and the Tyrosinase enzyme to act on hyper-pigmented spots. Applications for a European patent EP 2705830 and an international patent WO 2014037111 are filed in partnership with Aix-Marseille University and the CNRS .

In 2015, In'oya Laboratory wraps up a €430,000 fundraising campaign with PACA Investissement, CAAP Création and CPG with the goal of continuing its R&D efforts and launching a new line of skincare products in France and Africa.

In 2015, In'oya Laboratory launches the sales of its products to French pharmacies.

== Awards and recognition ==
In 2011, In'oya Laboratory receives the "Best Project of the Year" prize during the 13th annual "Le Phare de l’Entrepreneuriat" competition hosted by ACCEDE Provence.

In 2011, Abd Haq Bengeloune is named "Top African Entrepreneur in France" by the Africangels business angels network, whose aim is to support and enhance the value of multicultural entrepreneurs contributing to the development of the French economy.

In 2012, In'oya Laboratory is recognized at the 17th annual "Trophées de L’Economie" hosted by La Provence to highlight the value of innovative companies in the region.

In 2012, In’oya Laboratory wins the "Innovate, Buzz, Win" competition sponsored by Carrefour, which awarded the company an opportunity to sell its products in more than 200 Carrefour shops in France.

== Ecological commitments ==
In'oya Laboratory is committed to a sustainable development approach through the sourcing of its supplies from the Great Green Wall, a wall of trees that connects Dakar to Djibouti along the southern edge of the Sahara, which is cultivated and maintained by local populations.
