= Sodium/potassium/calcium exchanger 5 =

Protein

SLC24A5

Identifiers
- Aliases: SLC24A5, JSX, NCKX5, OCA6, SHEP4, solute carrier family 24 member 5
- External IDs: OMIM: 609802; MGI: 2677271; GeneCards: SLC24A5

Gene location (Human)
Chr.	Chromosome 15 (human)
Band	15q21.1	Start	48,120,990 bp
Band	15q21.1	End	48,142,672 bp

Gene location (Mouse)
Chr.	Chromosome 2 (mouse)
Band	2|2 F1	Start	124,910,044 bp
Band	2|2 F1	End	124,930,597 bp
RNA expression pattern
Bgee	Human / Mouse (ortholog); Top expressed in: testicle; skin of abdomen; thymus; skin of leg; substantia nigra; cerebellum; cerebellar cortex; cerebellar hemisphere; right hemisphere of cerebellum; duodenum / Top expressed in: blastocyst; ear; choroidal fissure; morula; inner ear; vasculature; vasculature of organ; neural layer of retina; embryo; choroid plexus of fourth ventricle; More reference expression data
BioGPS	n/a
Gene ontology
Molecular function	calcium ion binding; calcium channel activity; potassium ion binding; sodium ion binding; antiporter activity; symporter activity; calcium, potassium:sodium antiporter activity
Cellular component	integral component of membrane; Golgi apparatus; trans-Golgi network membrane; membrane; melanosome; integral component of plasma membrane; trans-Golgi network
Biological process	response to stimulus; sodium ion transport; cellular calcium ion homeostasis; ion transport; negative regulation of melanin biosynthetic process; potassium ion transport; ion transmembrane transport; regulation of melanin biosynthetic process; calcium ion transport; calcium ion transmembrane transport; sodium ion transmembrane transport; transmembrane transport; melanocyte differentiation; potassium ion transmembrane transport; anion transmembrane transport
Sources:Amigo / QuickGO
Orthologs
Databases	NCBI: entry; OMA: entry
Species	Human	Mouse
Entrez	283652	317750
Ensembl	ENSG00000188467	ENSMUSG00000035183
UniProt	Q71RS6	Q8C261
RefSeq (mRNA)	NM_205850	NM_175034
RefSeq (protein)	NP_995322	NP_778199
Location (UCSC)	Chr 15: 48.12 – 48.14 Mb	Chr 2: 124.91 – 124.93 Mb
PubMed search
- Wikidata
View/Edit Human	View/Edit Mouse

Sodium/potassium/calcium exchanger 5 (NCKX5), also known as solute carrier family 24 member 5 (SLC24A5), is a protein that in humans is encoded by the SLC24A5 gene that has a major influence on natural skin colour variation. The NCKX5 protein is a member of the potassium-dependent sodium/calcium exchanger family. Sequence variation in the SLC24A5 gene, particularly a non-synonymous SNP changing the amino acid at position 111 in NCKX5 from alanine to threonine, has been associated with differences in skin pigmentation.

The SLC24A5 gene's derived threonine or Ala111Thr allele (rs1426654) has been shown to be a major factor in the light skin tone of Europeans compared to Sub-Saharan Africans, and is believed to represent as much as 25–40% of the average skin tone difference between Europeans and West Africans. Possibly originating as long as 19,000 years ago, it has been the subject of selection in the ancestors of Europeans as recently as within the last 5,000 years, and is fixed in modern European populations. It was introduced into Khoisan people via "back-to-Africa" migration around 2,000 years ago is partly responsible for their differing skin tone to most other African populations.

== Gene ==
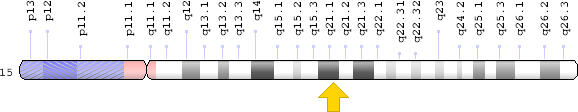
In human, the SLC24A5 gene is located on the long (q) arm of chromosome 15 at position 21.1.

The SLC24A5 gene, in humans, is located on the long (q) arm of chromosome 15 on position 21.1, from base pair 46,200,461 to base pair 46,221,881.

== Protein ==
NCKX5 is a 43 kDa protein that is partially localized to the trans-Golgi network in melanocytes. Removal of the NCKX5 protein disrupts melanogenesis in human and mouse melanocytes, causing a significant reduction in melanin pigment production. Site-directed mutagenesis corresponding to a non-synonymous single nucleotide polymorphism in SLC24A5 alters a residue in NCKX5 (A111T) that is important for NCKX5 sodium-calcium exchanger activity.

== Effect on skin color ==
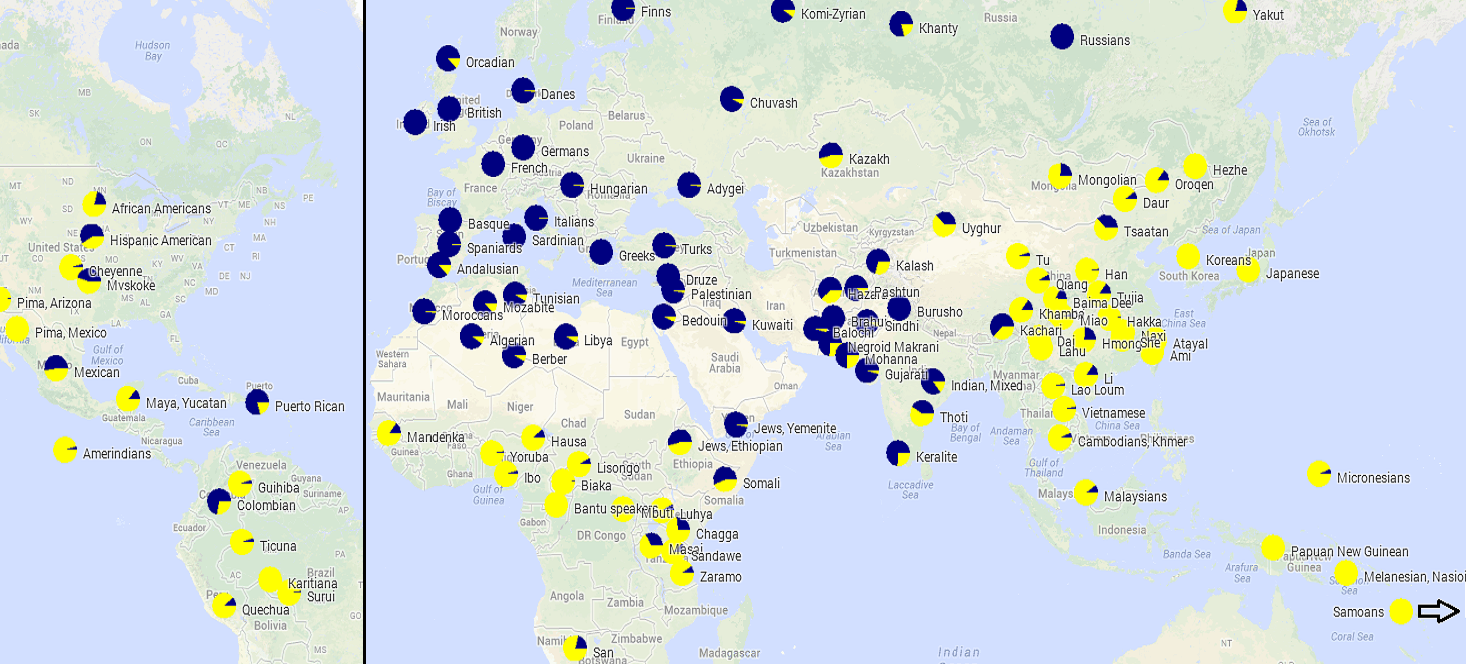
Global frequency distribution of the SLC24A5 gene's ancestral Ala111 allele (yellow) and its derived Ala111Thr allele (blue).

SLC24A5 appears to have played a key role in the evolution of light skin in humans of European ancestry. The gene's function in pigmentation was discovered in zebrafish as a result of the positional cloning of the gene responsible for the "golden" variety of this common pet store fish. Evidence in the International HapMap Project database of genetic variation in human populations showed that Europeans, represented by the "CEU" population, had two primary alleles differing by only one nucleotide, changing the 111th amino acid from alanine to threonine, abbreviated "A111T".

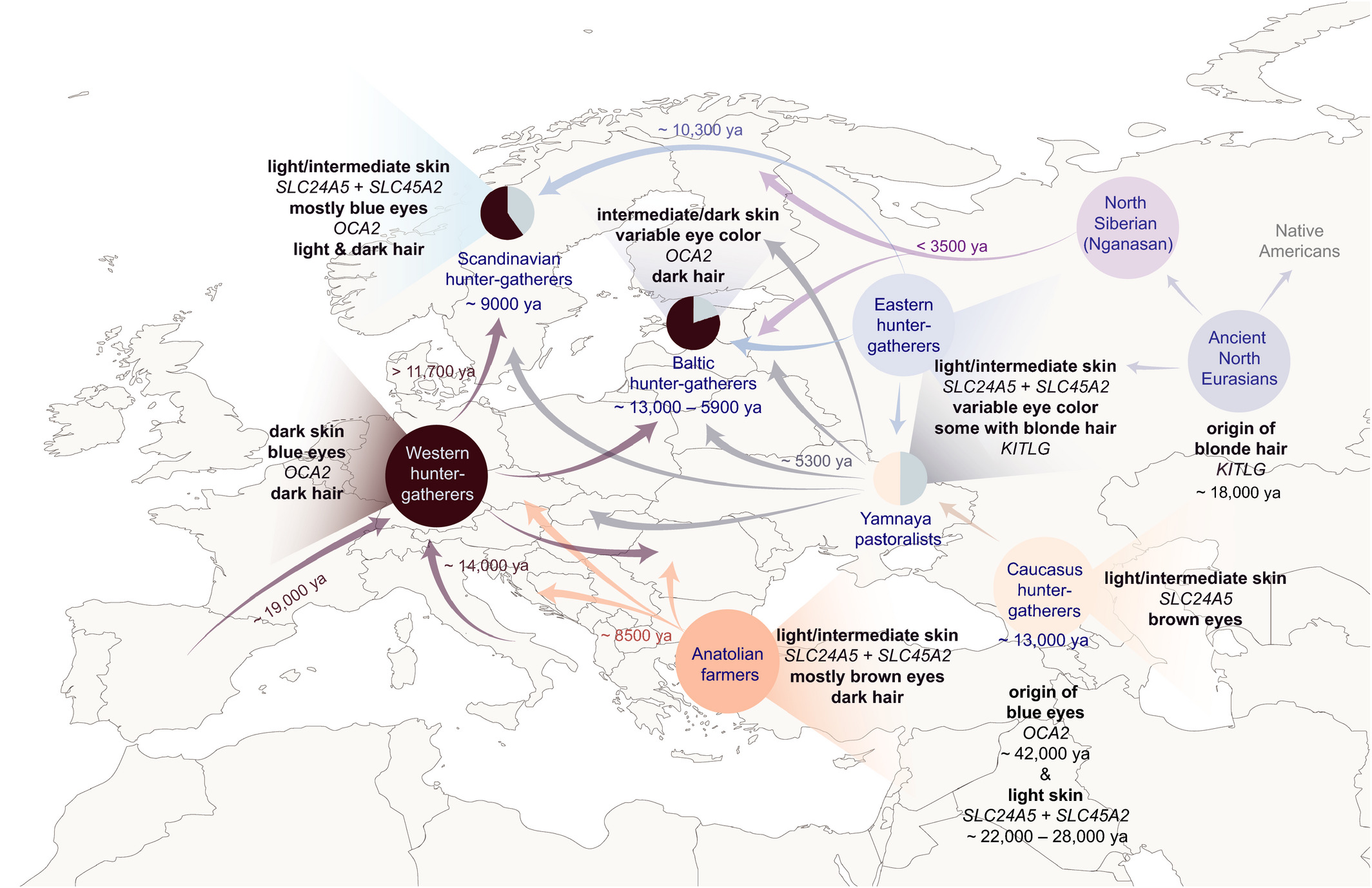
Origins of the SLC24A5 and SLC45A2 based on Archaeogenetics. Derived variants are said to have come from the Caucasus 28,000 years ago

The derived threonine allele (Ala111Thr; also known as A111T or Thr111) represented 98.7 to 100% of the alleles in European samples, while the ancestral or alanine form was found in 93 to 100% of samples of Sub-Saharan Africans, East Asians and Indigenous Americans. The variation is a SNP polymorphism rs1426654, which had been previously shown to be second among 3011 tabulated SNPs ranked as ancestry-informative markers. This single change in SLC24A5 explains between 25 and 38% of the difference in skin melanin index between peoples of sub-Saharan African and European ancestry.

The SNP rs2470102 independently affects skin pigmentation variation among the South Asian population.

Furthermore, the European mutation is associated with the largest region of diminished genetic variation in the CEU HapMap population, suggesting the possibility that the A111T mutation may be the subject of the single largest degree of selection in human populations of European ancestry. It is hypothesized that selection for the derived allele is based on the need for sunlight to produce the essential nutrient vitamin D. In northerly latitudes, where there is less sun, greater requirement for body coverage due to colder climate, and frequently, diets poor in vitamin D, making lighter skin more suitable for survival.

The earliest known sample of the threonine allele is 13,000 years old from Satsurblia Cave in Georgia. The allele was widespread from Anatolia to Ukraine and Iran at the beginning of the Neolithic.

This allele forms part of the HIrisplex DNA test system used to estimate pigmentation in forensic investigations.

== See also ==
- Human skin color
- SLC45A2
- Tiger eye
