= Oculocutaneous albinism =

Form of albinism

- Other names: OCA
- Specialty: Ophthalmology, dermatology

Oculocutaneous albinism is a form of albinism involving the eyes (oculo-), the skin (-cutaneous), and the hair. Overall, an estimated 1 in 20,000 people worldwide are born with oculocutaneous albinism. OCA is caused by mutations in several genes that control the synthesis of melanin within the melanocytes. Seven types of oculocutaneous albinism have been described, all caused by a disruption of melanin synthesis and all autosomal recessive disorders. Oculocutaneous albinism is also found in non-human animals.

== Types ==
The following types of oculocutaneous albinism have been identified in humans.

Name	OMIM	Gene	Description
OCA1	203100; 606952	TYR	OCA1 is caused by mutations of the tyrosinase gene, and can occur in two variations. The first is OCA1a, which means that the organism cannot synthesize melanin whatsoever. The hair is usually white (often translucent) and the skin is very pale. Vision usually ranges from 20/200 to 20/400. The second is OCA1b, which has several subtypes. Some individuals with OCA1b can tan and also develop pigment in the hair. One subtype of OCA1b is called OCA1b TS (temperature sensitive), where the tyrosinase can only function below a certain temperature, which causes the body hair in cooler body regions to develop pigment (i.e. get darker). (An equivalent mutation produces the points pattern in Siamese cats.) Another variant of OCA1b, called Albinism, yellow mutant type, is more common among the Amish than in other populations. It results in blonde hair and the eventual development of skin pigmentation during infancy, though at birth is difficult to distinguish from other types. About 1 in 40,000 people have some form of OCA1.
OCA2	203200	OCA2	The most common type of albinism is caused by mutation of the P gene. People with OCA2 generally have more pigment and better vision than those with OCA1, but cannot tan like some with OCA1b. A little pigment can develop in freckles or moles. People with OCA2 usually have fair skin, but are often not as pale as OCA1. They have pale blonde to golden, strawberry blonde, or even brown hair, and most commonly blue eyes. Affected people of African descent usually have a different phenotype (appearance): yellow hair, pale skin, and blue, gray, or hazel eyes. About 1 in 15,000 people have OCA2. The gene MC1R does not cause OCA2, but does affect its presentation.
OCA3	203290	TYRP1	Has only been partially researched and documented. It is caused by a mutation of the tyrosinase-related protein-1 (Tyrp1) gene. Cases have been reported in Africa and New Guinea. Affected individuals typically have red hair, reddish-brown skin, and blue or gray eyes. Variants may include rufous oculocutaneous albinism (ROCA or xanthism). The incidence rate of OCA3 is unknown.
OCA4	606574	SLC45A2	Is very rare outside Japan, where OCA4 accounts for 24% of albinism cases. OCA4 can only be distinguished from OCA2 through genetic testing and is caused by mutation of this membrane-associated transporter protein (MATP) gene. Several German patients were identified in 2004.
OCA5	615312		OCA5 was identified in a Pakistani family with "golden-colored hair, white skin, nystagmus, photophobia, foveal hypoplasia, and impaired visual acuity, regardless of their sex and age". Genetic analysis localized the defect to human chromosome region 4q24 but failed to identify a candidate gene.
OCA6	113750	SLC24A5	One of the rarest forms of OCA, OCA6 was detected in Chinese individuals but is not thought to be limited to this ethnicity. It is heterogeneous in its effect on hair color, and results from mutations in the SLC24A5 gene, a membrane transporter that plays a role in pigmentation in a range of vertebrate species.
OCA7	615179	LRMDA	OCA7 was originally characterized in a family from the Faroe Islands, but was subsequently identified in a Lithuanian patient. It is characterized by lighter pigmentation and significant effects on the eye, including decreased visual acuity and misrouting of neuronal tracks through the optic chiasm. It is due to mutation of a gene of unknown function, C10orf11 (now called LRMDA OMIM: 614537).
OCA8	619165	DCT	A relatively mild form caused by mutations in the gene DCT which encodes the enzyme dopachrome tautomerase.

== See also ==
- Piebaldism
- List of skin conditions
- List of cutaneous conditions associated with increased risk of nonmelanoma skin cancer
