= Rs16891982 =

SNP in the SLC45A2 gene

SNP: rs16891982
- Name(s): F374L, c.1122C>G
- Gene: SLC45A2
- Chromosome: 5
- Region: Exon 5

External databases
- Ensembl: Human SNPView
- dbSNP: rs16891982
- HapMap: rs16891982
- SNPedia: rs16891982

In genetics, rs16891982, also known as F374L, is the name for a single nucleotide polymorphism found in the SLC45A2 gene. The SNP consists of two alleles: C (cytosine) and G (guanine). It is associated with skin tone and hair/eye color. It is a type of missense mutation.

C allele homozygosity is associated with black hair in people of European descent, although those with this genotype are usually of non-European descent.

C/G allele heterozygosity is associated with black hair in people of European descent

G allele homozygosity is associated with light skin, hair, and eye color (European ancestry), those with this genotype also have a slightly higher susceptibility to melanoma.
