= Nina Jablonski =

American anthropologist and palaeobiologist

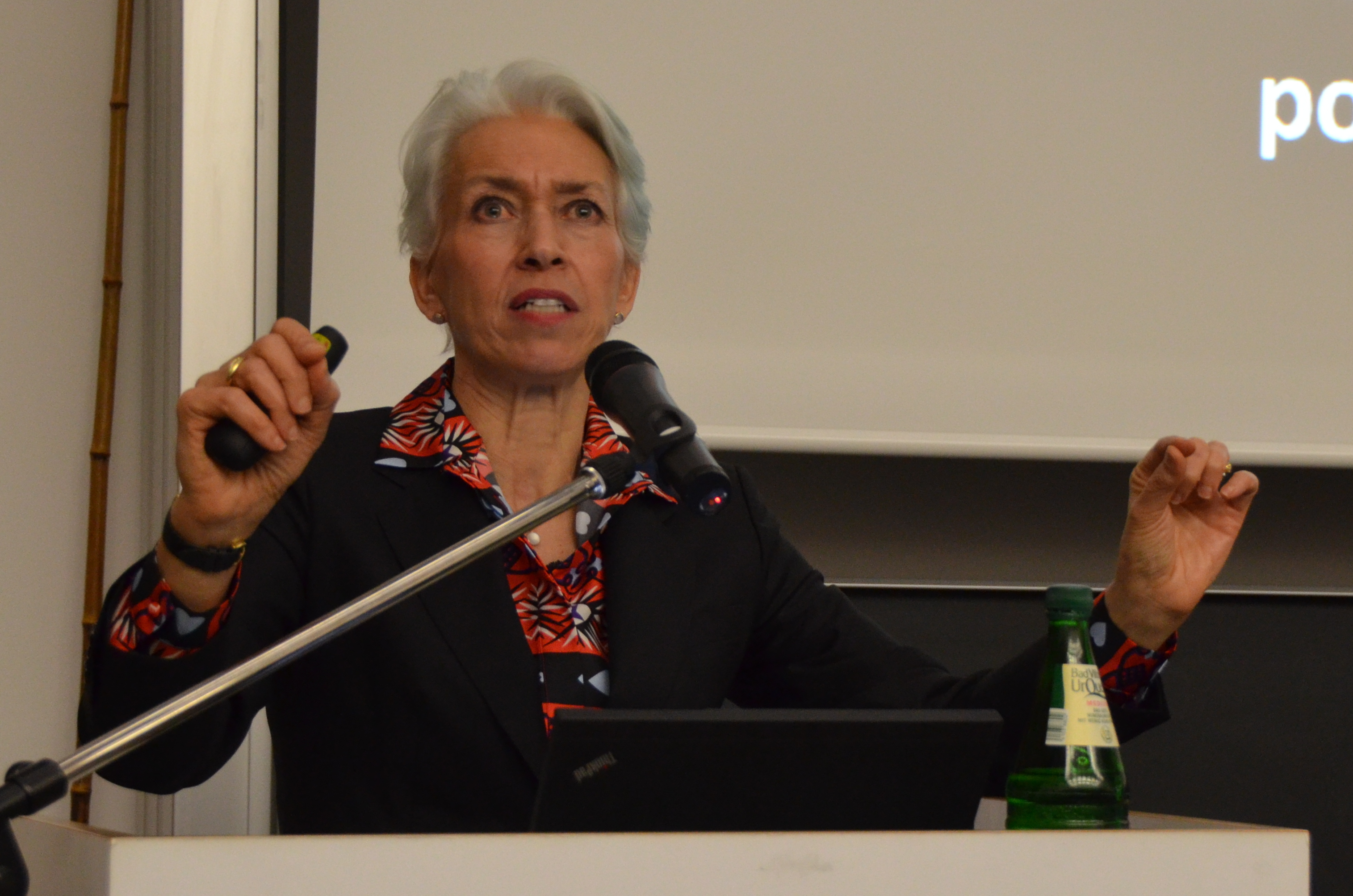
- Jablonski in 2017
- Born: Nina Grace Jablonski; August 20, 1953 (age 73); Hamburg, New York
- Education: Bryn Mawr College (1975 A.B.) University of Washington (1981 Ph.D.)
- Awards: Fletcher Foundation Fellow, 2005, Guggenheim Fellowship, 2012
- Scientific career
- Fields: anthropology, palaeobiology, paleontology, human biology
- Workplaces: The Pennsylvania State University
- Thesis: Functional Analysis of the Masticatory Apparatus of Theropithecus gelada (Primates: Cercopithecidae) (1981)
- Notable students: Tina Lasisi
- Website: anth.la.psu.edu/people/ngj2

Nina Grace Jablonski (born August 20, 1953) is an American anthropologist and palaeobiologist, known for her research into the evolution of skin color in humans. She is engaged in public education about human evolution, human diversity, and racism. In 2021, she was elected to the U.S. National Academy of Sciences and in 2009, she was elected to the American Philosophical Society. She is an Evan Pugh University Professor at The Pennsylvania State University, and the author of the books Skin: A Natural History, Living Color: The Biological and Social Meaning of Skin Color, and the co-author (with Sindiwe Magona and Lynn Fellman) of Skin We Are In.

== Early life and education ==
Jablonski grew up on a farm in upstate New York State. With encouragement from her parents, Jablonski began her exploration into the world of science when she was quite young. She recalls exploring the nature around her home, digging for fossils near creeks and trees. Jablonski's interest in studying human evolution stemmed from watching a National Geographic feature on the research of the famous paleoanthropologists Louis Leakey and Mary Leakey, that aired in the mid-1960s. Louis Leakey's study at Olduvai Gorge in East Africa and his focus on the hominid Zinjanthropus boisei sparked Jablonski's attention. She instantly decided that she wanted to pursue the study of human evolution, dismissing her parents' desire for her to attend medical school.

Jablonski earned an A.B. degree in biology from Bryn Mawr College in 1975. In the same year, she enrolled in the PhD program in the Department of Anthropology at the University of Washington. Working under the primary supervision of paleoanthropologist Gerald Eck, she became interested in the evolution of the African Old World monkeys and completed her PhD in anthropology in 1981 with the dissertation, "Functional Analysis of the Masticatory Apparatus of Theropithecus gelada (Primates: Cercopithecidae)." She has continued to research the evolution of the Old World monkeys and other Old World primates, including tarsiers, lemurs, and chimpanzees, until the present day. She has held teaching positions at the University of Hong Kong and the University of Western Australia. During these years, Jablonski began her research on the evolution of human bipedalism and skin color.

Jablonski is married to George Chaplin, a geospatial scientist, who is another professor as well as her research collaborator at Penn State University. She can write and speak fluently in Putonghua (Mandarin Chinese), and is also able to read in both Latin and German.

== Career ==
While a graduate student at the University of Washington, Jablonski conducted research at the University of Hong Kong in the Department of Anatomy. After completing her PhD, Jablonski accepted a position as lecturer in the Department of Anatomy at the University of Hong Kong. Remaining in this position from 1981 to 1990, she was able to continue her research into comparative anatomy and paleontology. She began research in cooperation with the Institute of Vertebrate Paleontology and Paleoanthropology in Beijing in 1982 and the Kunming Institute of Zoology in 1984. Her interest in the history of the East Asian paleoenvironment and the impact of environmental change on the evolution of mammals, especially primates, was spurred by her association with paleobotanist Robert Orr Whyte and his wife Pauline Whyte. The Whytes had inaugurated a series of biannual meetings under the auspices of the Centre of Asian Studies at the University of Hong Kong that brought together prominent geologists and paleoenvironmental scientists from China and other East and Southeast Asian countries. Jablonski took over the organization of the paleoenvironmental conferences and the editing of the conference proceedings after the deaths of the Whytes. While in Hong Kong, Jablonski assisted the Forensic Pathology Service of the Royal Hong Kong Police in the identification of numerous unknown human remains, including the refinement of the use of photographic superimposition for the positive identification of individuals. Working in collaboration with colleagues from the Faculties of Medicine and Dentistry, Jablonski created the collection of human skeletal remains at the University of Hong Kong. While still in Hong Kong, Jablonski began her research collaboration with George Chaplin on the origin of bipedalism in the human lineage; this work resulted in a series of publications in the early 1990s.

After her time in Hong Kong, Jablonski moved to Australia with her husband, George Chaplin, where she worked in the Department of Anatomy and Human Biology at the University of Western Australia from 1990 to 1994 as a Senior Lecturer. During this period, she began research on the evolution of human skin color. This research, along with her work on the evolution of human bipedalism, constituted her first forays into the study of human evolution and human diversification. She felt that the study of such topics was valuable for researchers because it showed that basic tools of comparative and historical biology could be used to deduce what probably happened in the past.

From 1994 to 2006, she held the Irvine Chair of Anthropology at the California Academy of Sciences in San Francisco. During this time, she was recognized as a Fellow of the California Academy of Sciences and as a Fellow of the American Association for the Advancement of Science. Her responsibilities at the California Academy of Sciences included organization of the Wattis Symposia in Anthropology and publication of the edited proceedings of those symposia. Among the Wattis Symposium volumes she edited was The First Americans: The Pleistocene Colonization of the New World, which included important contributions about the nature and timing of human movements into the Americas.

After leaving the California Academy of Sciences, she moved to The Pennsylvania State University, where she served as head of the Anthropology Department from 2006 to 2011. She is currently an Evan Pugh Professor of Anthropology at Penn State. Jablonski's research at Penn State has focused on the evolution of Old World monkeys, primate thermoregulation, and the evolution and meanings of human skin pigmentation. Starting in 2012, in partnership with Henry Louis Gates, Jr., host of the PBS show Finding Your Roots, she led the development of a curriculum aimed at getting younger students of color more interested in STEM. A series of PBS webisodes, "Finding Your Roots: The Seedlings" was released in 2017 and 2018 with three of the episodes earning Mid-Atlantic Emmy Awards in 2018 and 2019.

== Research ==
Jablonski researches human and primate evolution. She is known for her research into human skin, and has published two books on the subject. She researches the origin and evolution of the skin and skin pigmentation and the relationships between vitamin D requirements and metabolism in the context of human migration and urbanization. In 2012 she was awarded a Guggenheim Fellowship to carry out research into human vitamin D production in natural conditions with the goal of informing public health interventions addressing vitamin D deficiency.

=== Skin color ===
Jablonski studies the physiological functions of skin as well as the evolutionary and sociological influences of the past and today. Early in her skin research, she published papers on the connection between neural tube defects and ultraviolet radiation, which damages folate in the skin, in the controversial and non-peer reviewed journal Medical Hypotheses. This research was put on a strong empirical footing when she, in collaboration with George Chaplin, examined the measured skin color of indigenous human populations relative to levels of ultraviolet radiation at the earth's surface as measured by the NASA TOMS 7 satellite. In their paper on the evolution of human skin pigmentation, Jablonski and Chaplin also posited that dark skin with sweat glands evolved with the loss of most body hair, and demonstrated that sexual dimorphism in skin color was nearly universal in humans (with females tending towards lighter skin than males). They also speculated that similar skin colors evolved independently in different human populations under similar solar regimes, an insight that preceded the molecular genetic studies that confirmed the phenomenon. Jablonski's major findings explain that the physiological purpose for the variation in skin color around the world is due to the balance between the need to protect against ultraviolet radiation and facilitating the production of vitamin D. Darker skin due to increased eumelanin levels occurs in populations closer to the equator where ultraviolet radiation poses risks of folate damage, and depigmentation occurs in areas with low and highly seasonal levels of ultraviolet radiation so that vitamin D biosynthesis is not inhibited. Jablonski's recent collaboration with physiologists W. Larry Kenney and Tony Wolf at Penn State has yielded new research indicating a probable link between UV-induced folate loss and impaired thermoregulation.

Jablonski has taken this connection and applied it to understanding the effects of modern lifestyles on human health. Jablonski connects certain diseases and health risks to people living in areas distant from those of their ancestors and to people who are living the modern indoors lifestyle. Vitamin D deficiency is linked directly to several serious diseases including rickets, and is implicated in the causality of multiple sclerosis and many malignancies. The main health problems related to too much UV radiation are skin cancers, the most serious and rare being cutaneous melanoma. Birth defects due to folate deficiency are well known, but those tied directly to the effects of UVR-induced folate loss have not been documented in modern people.

=== Skin color and concepts of race ===
Since 2010, Jablonski has focused much of her research on understanding the link between skin color and the creation of color-based races during the European Enlightenment. The naming of groups of people, later referred to as races, based on skin color has proven durable because of its reinforcement by European and American business interests and politicians of the 18th century who benefited from the transatlantic slave trade. Jablonski's interest in the effects of race and racism in the U.S. and South Africa led to her being invited to be a Fellow of the Stellenbosch Institute for Advanced Study (STIAS) in 2011, and to be involved in the "Effects of Race Project" at STIAS from 2013 to 2020. In 2010, Jablonski received an honorary doctorate (D.Phil.) from Stellenbosch University for her contribution to the worldwide fight against racism.

=== Eumelanin Human Skin Colour Scale ===
Jablonski is a member of an international collaborative research group that developed the Eumelanin Human Skin Colour Scale, a novel method for classifying human skin colour that is independent of race, ethnicity and ancestry.

=== Old World monkeys ===
Jablonski's research on Old World monkeys is marked by extensive paleontological field work across Africa and Asia. Her work has led to significant discoveries including an ape cranium in China, and the first identified chimpanzee fossils. In 2004, along with Sally McBrearty, Jablonski discovered teeth in the collections of the National Museum of Kenya which originated from the Kapthurin Formation and dated back to ~545,000 years ago. By comparing their measurements to those of modern Pan teeth, Jablonski and McBrearty determined the fossils belonged to the genus Pan . Paleoecological evidence at the site showed that chimpanzees were not restricted to forest habitats. Along with the discovery of nearby Homo fossils of the same age, this provided the first fossil evidence for spatiotemporal coexistence between the two genera. More recently, Jablonski's fossil discoveries have been complemented by phylogenetic analysis of modern apes, suggesting that genomic divergence in ancestral gibbons was in part due to habitat shifts during the Miocene–Pliocene transition.

Jablonski's research on the genus Theropithecus also had significant impact, including the discovery of a near-complete skeleton of Theropithecus brumpti. This finding established T. brumpti as a terrestrial monkey similar to the modern T. gelada, albeit much larger. Her research is central to modern understanding of extinct Theropithecus size, habitat, and diet, much of which is detailed in Theropithecus: The Rise and Fall of a Primate Genus, edited by Jablonski. She has also written textbook analyses of the fossil record of tarsiers, gibbons, and Cercopithecoidea as a whole.

=== Primate thermoregulation ===
In 1994, Jablonski argued against a theory proposed by Peter Wheeler that thermoregulation played a role in hominids’ transition to bipedalism. Wheeler hypothesized that there was evolutionary pressure for early hominids to adopt bipedalism because an upright stance with less surface area exposed to sunlight allowed them to forage for longer without overheating. Jablonski's team constructed their own models, which led to the conclusion that thermoregulatory benefits weren't significant enough for natural selection to favor bipedalism.

In 2014, Jablonski began researching the adaptation of goose bumps because she was interested in the connection between the integument of ring-tailed lemurs and thermoregulation. The mechanism for goose bumps is the contraction of smooth muscle called Musculi Arrectores Pilorum (MAP). Jablonski noted that early primates did not have effective networks of MAP throughout the body, a factor that may have significantly affected their ability to forage under the cooler conditions of the late Eocene epoch. Using this information, she concluded that the absence of MAP networks in early primates likely contributed to their extinction in non-tropical latitudes. Jablonski also made connections between goose bumps and brain size, as the ability to regulate body temperature without changes in metabolism seemed to her a necessary adaptation to accommodate the thermal and metabolic sensitivities of larger brains.

Jablonski is also interested in exploring how the behaviors of ring-tailed lemurs relate to thermoregulation. In 2016, she traveled to Madagascar where she concluded that lemurs depend on behaviors of sunbathing and huddling to retain heat.

== Publications ==
- Magona, S. and Jablonski, N. G. (authors), and Fellman, L. (illustrator) (2018) Skin We Are In. Cape Town, David Philip Publishers. (Available in English, Afrikaans, isiNdebele, Siswati, isiXhosa, isiZulu, Sepedi, Sesotho, Setswana, Tshivenda, Xitsonga)
- Jablonski, N. G. (2012) Living Color: The Biological and Social Meaning of Skin Color. Berkeley, University of California Press. (Available in Chinese, Spanish, and Italian.)
- Jablonski, N. G. (2006) Skin: a Natural History. Berkeley, University of California Press. (Available in Korean; Chinese translation expected 2021)

== See also ==
- Biological determinism
- Dark skin
- Hair
- Human skin color
- Light skin
- Lufengpithecus
