= Potassium-dependent sodium-calcium exchanger =

Type of antiporter membrane protein

Potassium-dependent sodium-calcium exchanger also known as solute carrier family 24 (SLC24) is a type of sodium-calcium exchanger that requires potassium to function.

== Family members ==
Human genes that encode members of the potassium-dependent sodium-calcium exchanger family include:

solute carrier family 24, member 1

Identifiers
- Symbol: SLC24A1
- Alt. symbols: NCKX1
- NCBI gene: 9187
- HGNC: 10975
- OMIM: 603617
- RefSeq: NM_004727
- UniProt: O60721

Other data
- Locus: Chr. 15 q22
Search for
- Structures: Swiss-model
- Domains: InterPro

solute carrier family 24, member 2

Identifiers
- Symbol: SLC24A2
- Alt. symbols: NCKX2
- NCBI gene: 25769
- HGNC: 10976
- OMIM: 609838
- RefSeq: NM_020344
- UniProt: Q9UI40

Other data
- Locus: Chr. 9 p22-p13
Search for
- Structures: Swiss-model
- Domains: InterPro

solute carrier family 24, member 3

Identifiers
- Symbol: SLC24A3
- Alt. symbols: NCKX3
- NCBI gene: 57419
- HGNC: 10977
- OMIM: 609839
- RefSeq: NM_020689
- UniProt: Q9HC58

Other data
- Locus: Chr. 20 p13
Search for
- Structures: Swiss-model
- Domains: InterPro

solute carrier family 24, member 4

Identifiers
- Symbol: SLC24A4
- Alt. symbols: NCKX4
- NCBI gene: 123041
- HGNC: 10978
- OMIM: 609840
- RefSeq: NM_153646
- UniProt: Q8NFF2

Other data
- Locus: Chr. 14 q32
Search for
- Structures: Swiss-model
- Domains: InterPro

solute carrier family 24, member 5

Identifiers
- Symbol: SLC24A5
- Alt. symbols: NCKX5
- NCBI gene: 283652
- HGNC: 20611
- OMIM: 609802
- RefSeq: NM_205850
- UniProt: Q71RS6

Other data
- Locus: Chr. 15 q15.2
Search for
- Structures: Swiss-model
- Domains: InterPro

solute carrier family 24, member 6

Identifiers
- Symbol: SLC24A6
- Alt. symbols: NCKX6
- NCBI gene: 80024
- HGNC: 26175
- OMIM: 609841
- RefSeq: NM_024959
- UniProt: Q6J4K2

Other data
- Locus: Chr. 12 q24
Search for
- Structures: Swiss-model
- Domains: InterPro
