= Eumelanin Human Skin Colour Scale =

Skin colour classification system

The Eumelanin Human Skin Colour Scale (EHSCS) is a five-category objective human skin colour classification scale. It was introduced in 2022 by a research group led by Consultant Dermatologist Dr Ophelia E. Dadzie, having been published in a proof-of-concept study in the British Journal of Dermatology.

The scale uses spectrophotometric measurement of skin reflectance to generate a numerical Melanin Index (MI), which is then used to categorise skin colour into five ranges. The developers proposed the EHSCS as a standardised, race-, ethnicity-, and ancestry-independent approach for describing human skin colour in dermatological and scientific research.

== Background and development ==
The most widely recognised classification system used in dermatology is the Fitzpatrick Skin Phototype Classification System, or Fitzpatrick scale, introduced in 1975 by Thomas Fitzpatrick. The Fitzpatrick scale was developed to classify skin response to ultraviolet radiation in European populations, and was proposed to evaluate this cohort's propensity to burn or tan during phototherapy. Over time other populations with more darkly pigmented skin were added to this scale, and the scale was increasingly used as a skin colour scale by dermatologists and skin biologists. The Fitzpatrick scale was never primarily developed to be used as a skin colour scale and it does not accurately reflect the full spectrum of human skin colour.

The EHSCS was developed as a method for objectively describing the full spectrum of human skin colour. Development involved an international collaboration of researchers with diverse background: Dr Ophelia E. Dadzie (Consultant Dermatologist, leader of the group), Professor Nina Jablonski (Anthropologist), Dr Damilola Fajuyigbe (Photobiologist), Dr Antoine Petit (Consultant Dermatologist), and Professor Rick Sturm (Pigmentation Molecular Geneticist).

The proof-of-concept study describing the EHSCS was published in the British Journal of Dermatology in 2022.

== Terminology ==
The scale uses the term 'eumelanin', the dominant human skin chromophore, to provide a biologically based framework for describing skin colour. The term describes biological pigment associated with human skin colour rather than categories based on race or ethnicity.

== Methodology ==
The EHSCS uses a numerical Melanin Index (MI) derived from spectrophotometric measurement of skin reflectance. Spectrophotometers measure the amount of light reflected from the skin at defined wavelengths, producing quantitative values related to pigmentation. The developers reviewed the published literature on skin reflectance from populations around the world, and they were able to ascertain the range of MI across global populations, defining the lowest and highest levels of MI and then dividing the range into five categories, as shown below:

Category	Abbreviation	Melanin Index range
Eumelanin Low	EML	Under 25
Eumelanin Intermediate Low	EMIL	25 to under 50
Eumelanin Intermediate	EMI	50 to under 75
Eumelanin Intermediate High	EMIH	75 to under 100
Eumelanin High	EMH	100 or higher

== Reception ==
Following publication of the 2022 study, the British Medical Journal described the EHSCS as an evidence-based approach to describing skin colour in dermatology.

The scale has been discussed in professional and public-facing publications, including the British Association of Dermatologists. Coverage in Stylist and Cosmetics Business reported on how the scale may better support Black women and women of colour to receive "accurate care" for health symptoms which appear differently on varied skin colours.
