= Dopachrome tautomerase =

Enzyme found in humans

DCT

Identifiers
- Aliases: DCT, TRP-2, TYRP2, dopachrome tautomerase, OCA8
- External IDs: OMIM: 191275; MGI: 102563; GeneCards: DCT
Available structures
PDB	Ortholog search: PDBe RCSB
PDB	List of PDB id codes 4HX1
Enzyme activity
EC #	BRENDA	ExPASy	KEGG	MetaCyc
5.3.3.12	↗	↗	↗	↗

Gene location (Human)
Chr.	Chromosome 13 (human)
Band	13q32.1	Start	94,436,811 bp
Band	13q32.1	End	94,479,682 bp

Gene location (Mouse)
Chr.	Chromosome 14 (mouse)
Band	14 E4|14 61.6 cM	Start	118,250,202 bp
Band	14 E4|14 61.6 cM	End	118,289,656 bp
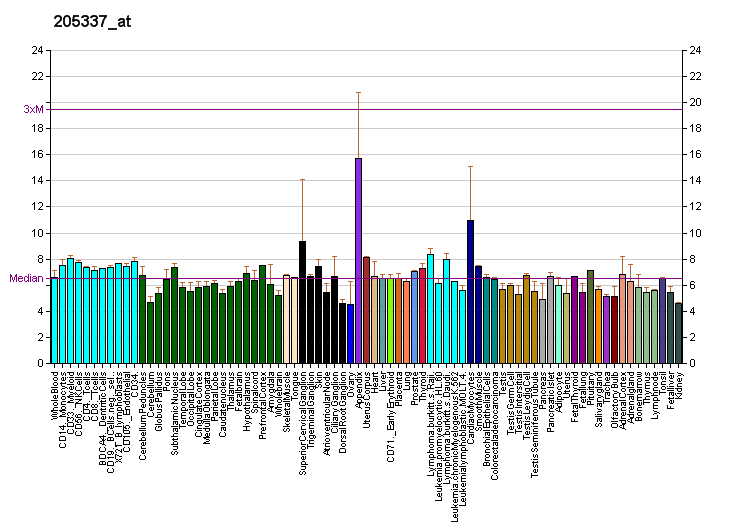

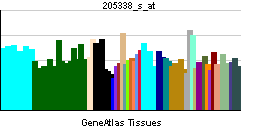

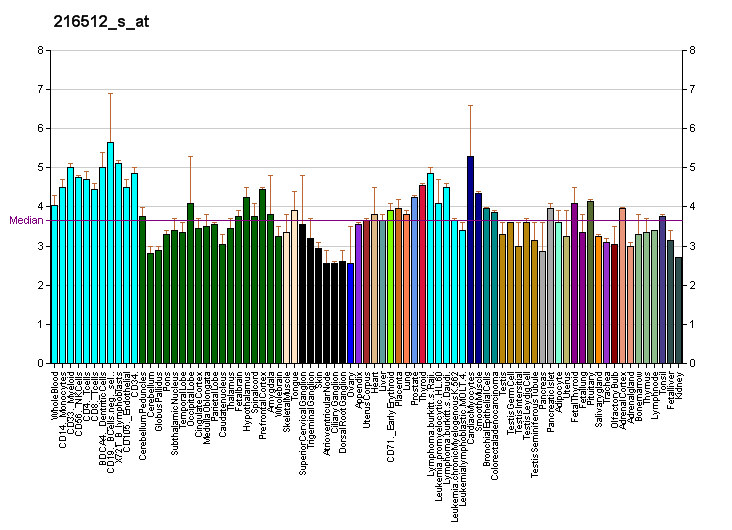
RNA expression pattern
Bgee	Human / Mouse (ortholog); Top expressed in: skin of thigh; skin of arm; secondary oocyte; nipple; skin of hip; vulva; human penis; retinal pigment epithelium; testicle; skin of abdomen / Top expressed in: iris; ciliary body; stria vascularis; hair follicle; retinal pigment epithelium; utricle; epithelium of lens; corneal stroma; skin of back; left lobe of liver; More reference expression data
BioGPS	More reference expression data
Gene ontology
Molecular function	isomerase activity; metal ion binding; oxidoreductase activity; copper ion binding; dopachrome isomerase activity
Cellular component	cytoplasm; integral component of membrane; cytosol; membrane; melanosome; melanosome membrane
Biological process	positive regulation of neuroblast proliferation; melanin biosynthetic process; cell development; ventricular zone neuroblast division; melanin biosynthetic process from tyrosine; epidermis development; developmental pigmentation; pigmentation; metabolism
Sources:Amigo / QuickGO
Orthologs
Databases	NCBI: entry; OMA: entry
Species	Human	Mouse
Entrez	1638	13190
Ensembl	ENSG00000080166	ENSMUSG00000022129
UniProt	P40126	P29812
RefSeq (mRNA)	NM_001129889; NM_001922; NM_001322182; NM_001322183; NM_001322184 NM_001322185; NM_001322186	NM_010024
RefSeq (protein)	NP_001123361; NP_001309111; NP_001309112; NP_001309113; NP_001309114 NP_001309115; NP_001913	NP_034154
Location (UCSC)	Chr 13: 94.44 – 94.48 Mb	Chr 14: 118.25 – 118.29 Mb
PubMed search
- Wikidata
View/Edit Human	View/Edit Mouse

Dopachrome tautomerase is an enzyme that in humans is encoded by the gene DCT. Its expression is regulated by the microphthalmia-associated transcription factor (MITF). Dopachrome tautomerase is induced by blue light, and is involved in the production of melanin. Pathogenic mutations in the DCT gene have been associated with oculocutaneous albinism, where low levels of pigment are produced by the skin, hair, and eyes. The type linked to DCT has relatively mild symptoms and is called Oculocutaneous Albinism, Type VIII.

Alternative names include dopachrome delta-isomerase and tyrosinase-related protein 2.

== See also ==
- Tyrosinase-related protein 1 (TYRP1)
- Dopachrome, a cyclization product of L-DOPA and is an intermediate in the biosynthesis of melanin.
