= Membrane-associated transporter protein =

Protein

SLC45A2

Identifiers
- Aliases: SLC45A2, 1A1, AIM1, MATP, OCA4, SHEP5, solute carrier family 45 member 2
- External IDs: OMIM: 606202; MGI: 2153040; GeneCards: SLC45A2

Gene location (Human)
Chr.	Chromosome 5 (human)
Band	5p13.2	Start	33,944,623 bp
Band	5p13.2	End	33,984,693 bp

Gene location (Mouse)
Chr.	Chromosome 15 (mouse)
Band	15 A1|15 5.4 cM	Start	11,000,807 bp
Band	15 A1|15 5.4 cM	End	11,029,319 bp
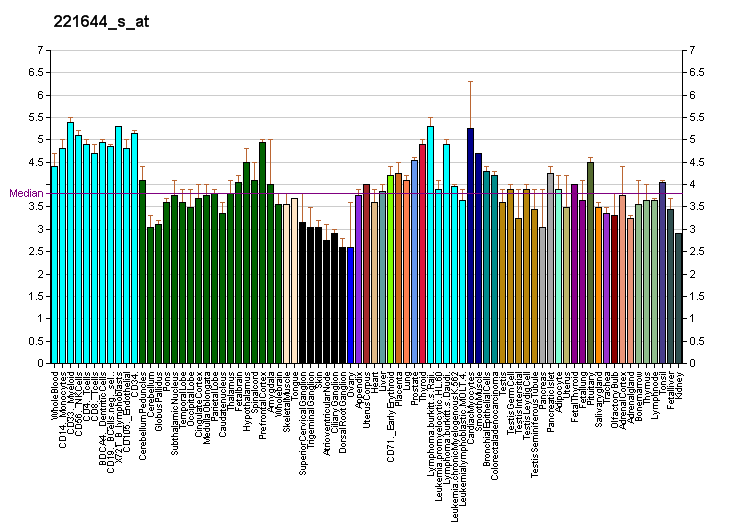

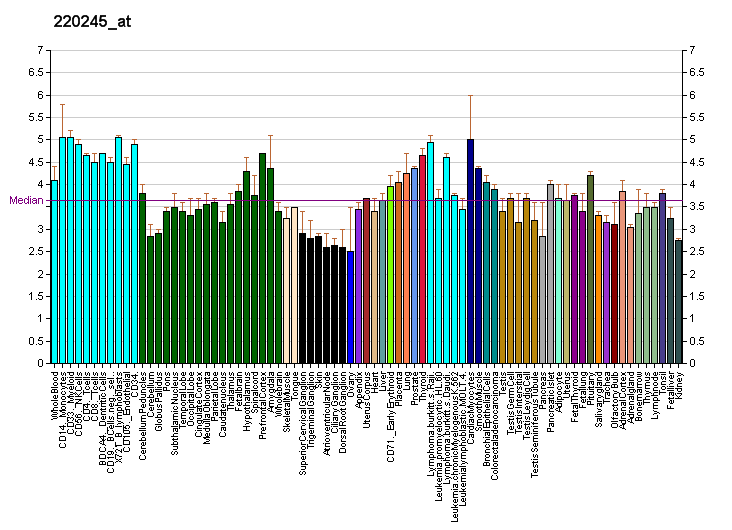
RNA expression pattern
Bgee	Human / Mouse (ortholog); Top expressed in: testicle; retinal pigment epithelium; gonad; right lobe of liver; islet of Langerhans; right auricle of heart; skin of leg; hypothalamus; human kidney; fundus / Top expressed in: iris; stria vascularis; hair follicle; gastrula; ciliary body; surface ectoderm; embryo; primary oocyte; cornea; cochlea; More reference expression data
BioGPS	More reference expression data
Gene ontology
Molecular function	sucrose:proton symporter activity
Cellular component	melanosome membrane; integral component of membrane; membrane
Biological process	sucrose transport; developmental pigmentation; melanin biosynthetic process; response to stimulus; visual perception
Sources:Amigo / QuickGO
Orthologs
Databases	NCBI: entry; OMA: entry
Species	Human	Mouse
Entrez	51151	22293
Ensembl	ENSG00000281919; ENSG00000164175	ENSMUSG00000022243
UniProt	Q9UMX9	P58355
RefSeq (mRNA)	NM_001012509; NM_001297417; NM_016180	NM_053077
RefSeq (protein)	NP_001012527; NP_001284346; NP_057264	NP_444307
Location (UCSC)	Chr 5: 33.94 – 33.98 Mb	Chr 15: 11 – 11.03 Mb
PubMed search
- Wikidata
View/Edit Human	View/Edit Mouse

Membrane-associated transporter protein (MATP), also known as solute carrier family 45 member 2 (SLC45A2) or melanoma antigen AIM1, is a protein that in humans is encoded by the SLC45A2 gene.

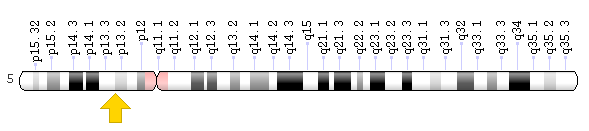
In human, the SLC45A2 gene is located on the short (p) arm of chromosome 5 at position 13.2.

== Function ==
SLC45A2 is a transporter protein that mediates melanin synthesis. It may regulate the pH of the melanosome, affecting tyrosinase activity. SLC45A2 is also a melanocyte differentiation antigen that is expressed in a high percentage of melanoma cell lines. A similar sequence gene in medaka fish, 'B,' encodes a transporter that mediates melanin synthesis. Mutations in this gene are a cause of oculocutaneous albinism type 4. Alternative splicing results in multiple transcript variants encoding different isoforms. Protein expression is localized to the melanosome, and analysis of the by knockdown of RNA expression leads to altered melanosome pH potentially altering tyrosinase function by affecting copper binding.

In melanocytic cell types, the SLC45A2 gene is regulated by microphthalmia-associated transcription factor.

SLC45A2 has been found to play a role in pigmentation in several species. In humans, it has been identified as a factor in the light skin of Europeans and as an ancestry-informative marker for distinguishing Sri Lankan from European ancestry. Mutations in the gene have also been identified as the cause of human Type IV oculocutaneous albinism. SLC45A2 is the so-called cream gene responsible in horses for buckskin, palomino and cremello coloration, while a mutation in this gene underlies the white tiger variant. In dogs a mutation to this gene causes white fur, pink skin, and blue eyes.

SLC45A2 was identified as a melanoma tumor-associated antigen with high tumor specificity and reduced potential for autoimmune toxicity, and is currently in clinical development as a target for T-cell based immunotherapy.

== See also ==
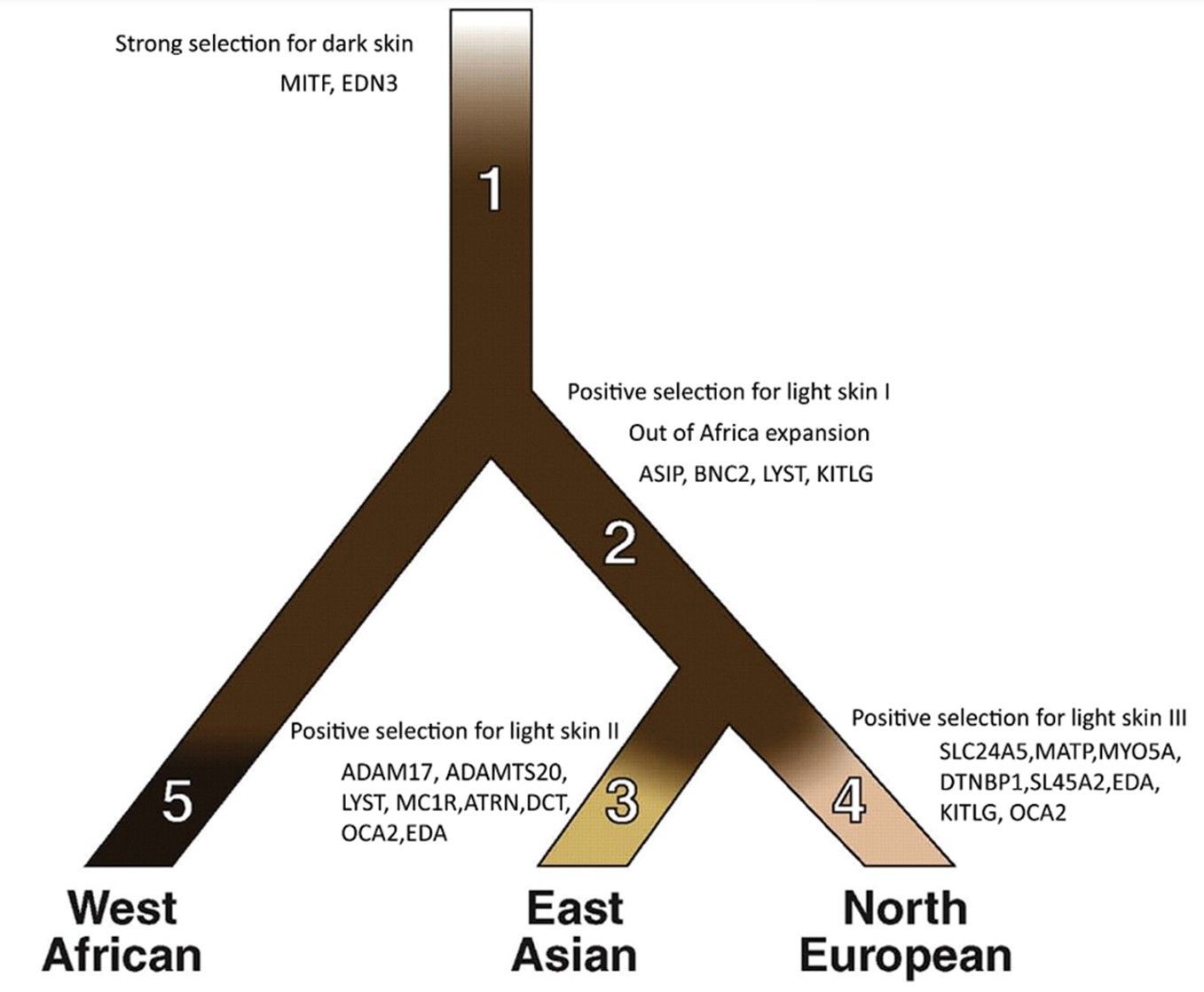
- Evolution and divergence of light skin mutations and alleles. The SLC45A2 contributes to pigmentation in Europeans.
  Solute carrier family
