= TYRP1 =

Enzyme

Identifiers
- Aliases: TYRP1, CAS2, CATB, GP75, OCA3, TRP, TRP1, TYRP, b-PROTEIN, tyrosinase related protein 1
- External IDs: OMIM: 115501; MGI: 98881; GeneCards: TYRP1

Gene location (Human)
Chr.	Chromosome 9 (human)
Band	9p23	Start	12,685,439 bp
Band	9p23	End	12,710,285 bp

Gene location (Mouse)
Chr.	Chromosome 4 (mouse)
Band	4 C3|4 37.89 cM	Start	80,752,360 bp
Band	4 C3|4 37.89 cM	End	80,769,956 bp
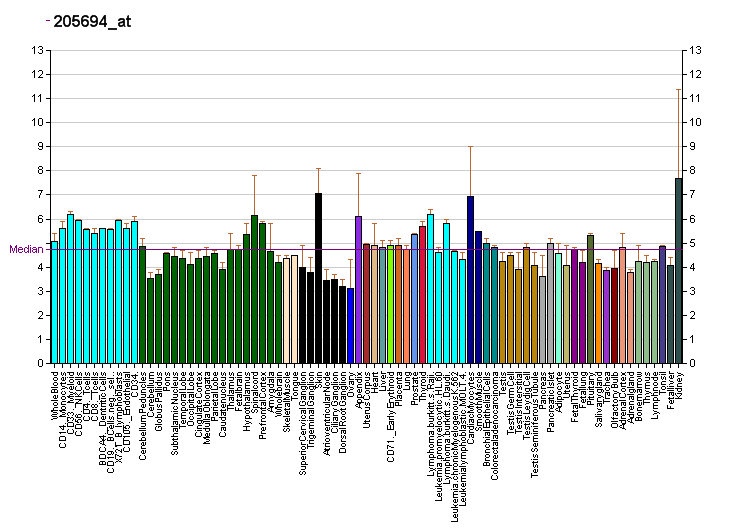
RNA expression pattern
Bgee	Human / Mouse (ortholog); Top expressed in: retinal pigment epithelium; skin of thigh; vulva; human penis; skin of arm; Epithelium of choroid plexus; skin of hip; nipple; right ventricle; myocardium of left ventricle / Top expressed in: iris; ciliary body; hair follicle; retinal pigment epithelium; lumbar spinal ganglion; epithelium of lens; choroid; habenula; cornea; conjunctival fornix; More reference expression data
BioGPS	More reference expression data
Gene ontology
Molecular function	protein homodimerization activity; metal ion binding; monooxygenase activity; protein binding; protein heterodimerization activity; oxidoreductase activity; tyrosinase activity
Cellular component	integral component of membrane; clathrin-coated endocytic vesicle membrane; membrane; melanosome; endosome membrane; melanosome membrane; cytoplasm; intracellular vesicle
Biological process	melanin metabolic process; melanosome organization; positive regulation of melanin biosynthetic process; pigmentation; metabolism; melanocyte differentiation; acetoacetic acid metabolic process; melanin biosynthetic process; response to thyroid hormone
Sources:Amigo / QuickGO
Orthologs
Databases	NCBI: entry; OMA: entry
Species	Human	Mouse
Entrez	7306	22178
Ensembl	ENSG00000107165	ENSMUSG00000005994
UniProt	P17643	P07147
RefSeq (mRNA)	NM_000550	NM_001282014; NM_001282015; NM_031202
RefSeq (protein)	NP_000541	NP_001268943; NP_001268944; NP_112479
Location (UCSC)	Chr 9: 12.69 – 12.71 Mb	Chr 4: 80.75 – 80.77 Mb
PubMed search
- Wikidata
View/Edit Human	View/Edit Mouse

Tyrosinase-related protein 1, also known as TYRP1, is an intermembrane enzyme which in humans is encoded by the TYRP1 gene.

== Function ==
Tyrp1 is a melanocyte-specific gene product involved in melanin synthesis within melanosomes. Most Tyrp1 possess 5,6-dihydroxyindole-2-carboxylic acid (melanogenic intermediate) oxidase activity. The catalytic function of Tyrp1 in human melanocytes is less clear. Tyrp1 is involved in stabilizing of tyrosinase protein and modulating its catalytic activity. Tyrp1 is also involved in maintenance of melanosome structure and affects melanocyte proliferation and melanocyte cell death. Melanocytes are derived from the neural crest and migrate into the overlying epidermal ectoderm of a developing organism which forms skin and hair. Therefore, Tyrp1 influences the expression of melanin notably in the skin and hair of an organism.

The Tyrp1 gene also has a non-coding function which indirectly promotes melanoma tumor cell proliferation, especially when highly expressed in a cell. Tyrp1 mRNA interacts with miR-16 and affects its ability to repress genes involved in melanoma cell production.

== Clinical significance ==
Mutations in the mouse Tyrp1 gene are associated with brown pelage and in the human TYRP1 gene with oculocutaneous albinism type 3 (OCA3). An allele of TYRP1 common in Solomon Islanders results in blond hair. Although the phenotype is similar to Northern European blond hair, this allele is not found in Europeans.

Norton et al. 2016 study found TYRP1 is not associated with blond hair color in Melanesians as many populations in Oceania did not carry TYRP1 alleles but still displayed blondism, study indicates that additional unknown alleles contribute to the blondism phenotype in Melanesians.

Alterations of the Tyrp1 gene is responsible for some of the differing phenotypes of skin and coat appearance in various animals. In Dalmatians, black versus "liver" spot color is due to genetic variation of the TYRP1 gene. A particular deletion in the Tyrp1 gene of domestic Chinese-Tibetan swine results in a "brown coloration" of the swine's skin and hair as opposed to the wild-type "black" phenotype. In Oujiang-color carp, mutations of the Tyrp1 gene influenced the expression of "grey" or "brown" phenotypic color of scales.

Elevated levels of Tyrp1 gene expression is also associated with unfavorable patient outcome of those affected by melanoma. The role of Tyrp1 in melanoma progression was determined by comparing "knockout" cell lines which have inactive Tyrp1 to cells with normal and highly expressed Tyrp1. Such studies provide insight to possible clinical usage and treatment of melanoma via regulation of Tyrp1 expression in cells.

== Regulation ==
The expression of TYRP1 is regulated by the microphthalmia-associated transcription factor (MITF).

== Interactions ==
TYRP1 has been shown to interact with GIPC1.

== See also ==
- Dopachrome tautomerase (DCT; also known as TYRP2)
