= Photosensitivity in humans =

Light sensitivity in homo sapiens

Light sensitivity or photosensitivity refers to a notable or increased reactivity to light. Apart from vision, human beings have many physiological and psychological responses to light. In rare individuals, an atypical response may result in serious discomfort, disease, or injury. Some drugs have a photosensitizing effect. Properties of natural or artificial light that may abnormally affect people include:

- Timing of light (upset of normal circadian rhythms, seasonal affective disorder, sleep disorders)
- Intensity of light (photophobia, sunburn, skin cancer)
- Wavelength of light (in lupus, urticaria)
- Rapid flickers in intensity of light may trigger or aggravate photosensitive epilepsy, epileptic seizure, or migraine.

Conditions that may include sensitivity to light include vertigo and chronic fatigue syndrome.

Controlled application of artificial light can be used in a program of light therapy to treat some disorders.

== Sunlight ==
Sunlight, especially its ultraviolet radiation component, can cause increased or additional types of damage in predisposed individuals, such as those taking certain phototoxic drugs, or those with certain conditions associated with photosensitivity, including:

- Psoriasis
- Atopic eczema
- Mastocytosis
- Mast cell activation syndrome
- Histamine intolerance
- Erythema multiforme
- Seborrhoeic dermatitis
- Autoimmune bullous diseases (immunobullous diseases)
- Mycosis fungoides
- Smith–Lemli–Opitz syndrome
- Porphyria cutanea tarda
- Xeroderma pigmentosum

Also, many conditions are aggravated by strong light, including:

- Systemic lupus erythematosus
- Sjögren syndrome
- Sinear–Usher syndrome
- Rosacea
- Dermatomyositis
- Darier's disease
- Kindler–Weary syndrome

== Fluorescent and LED lamps ==
The Scientific Committee on Emerging and Newly Identified Health Risks (SCENIHR) in 2008 reviewed the connections between light from fluorescent lamps, especially from compact fluorescent lamp, and numerous human diseases, with results including:

- The inner-ear condition Ménière's disease can be aggravated by flicker. Sufferers of vertigo are recommended to not use fluorescent lights.
- Polymorphous light eruption is a condition affecting the skin thought to be caused by an adverse reaction to ultraviolet light. Its prevalence across Europe is 10-20% of the population. Artificial light sources may provoke the condition, and compact fluorescent light have been shown to produce an eruption.
- Chronic actinic dermatitis is a condition where a subject's skin becomes inflamed due to a reaction to sunlight or artificial light. Its prevalence in Scotland is 16.5 per 100,000 population. There is evidence that compact fluorescent light can worsen the condition.
- With the autoimmune disease lupus, exposure to compact fluorescent lamps will induce disease activity in photosensitive SLE patients.
- There is evidence that actinic prurigo is worsened by compact fluorescent light. This disease affects 3.3% of the general population.
- 3.1% of the population suffer from solar urticaria, a skin disorder affected by ultraviolet light. Some patients are directly affected by compact fluorescent light.
- Phytophotodermatitis may be aggravated by the additional levels of ultraviolet light emitted by compact fluorescent light.
- Patients undergoing photodynamic therapy are at additional risk of adverse photosensitive reactions caused by compact fluorescent light.
- One cause of cataracts is exposure to ultraviolet light. Provided the level of UV emission from lamps is within safe limits, and the lamp a sufficient distance away from the individual, there should be no increased risk of developing cataracts.
- Photophobia is a symptom of excessive sensitivity to light which affects 5 to 20% of the population. Studies have shown that fluorescent lighting (which flickers 100 times a second) is twice as likely to cause headaches in office workers as non-flickering lights.
- No similar studies have been conducted into the effect of LED (light-emitting diode) lights on sufferers of photophobia but, because LED flickering is "even more pronounced", it is possible that LED lights are "even more likely to cause headaches".
- There is evidence that flicker can cause seizures in patients with photosensitive epilepsy, but there has yet to be any evidence to date attributing seizures to compact fluorescent lamps.
- Self-reporting suggests fluorescent lamps aggravate dyslexia.

== See also ==
- Asthenopia (eye strain)
- Photophobia
- Phototoxicity
- Photosensitivity
- Photosensitivity in animals
- Photodermatitis
- Phytophotodermatitis
