= Photodermatosis =

- Specialty: Dermatology
- Symptoms: Rash; discoloration (red, purple or patches); Itchy or irritated skin; Streaks or round spots
- Causes: An abnormal reaction to sunlight, especially the UV light component.

Photodermatoses is a group of skin diseases characterized by a skin condition due to abnormal skin reactions to ultraviolet (UV) radiation. These abnormal skin reactions may develop into rashes. While reactions to UV radiation is common, true photodermatoses is considered when an abnormal reaction is caused by UV-A rays or radiation between 320 and 400 nm.

== Overview ==
Photodermatoses can be categorized into primary or secondary photodermatoses based on the cause of the reaction. Primary photodermatoses are immunology mediated or caused by chemical/drug exposure. An example of primary photodermatoses is polymorphous light eruption. Polymorphous light eruption is the most common type of photodermatoses. It is most likely due to an abnormal immune system reaction to the sun. Polymorphous light eruption occurs in approximately 10 to 20 percent of otherwise healthy individuals, so it is a relatively common condition. A more rare photodermatoses is hydroa vacciniforme with a prevalence of 0.34 per 100 000.

=== Immune-mediated Photodermatoses ===
- Polymorphous light eruption (PMLE)
- Hydroa vacciniforme
- Chronic actinic dermatitis
- Actinic prurigo
- Solar urticaria

=== Drug or chemical induced ===
- Phototoxic reactions: drug-induced phototoxic reactions, phytophotodermatitis
- Photoallergic reaction

Secondary photodermatoses stems from underlying disorders including genetic diseases and photoaggravated dermatoses.

=== Photoaggravated dermatoses ===
- Systemic lupus erythematosus (SLE)
- Dermatomyositis
- Acne vulgaris
- Herpes simplex
- Lichen planus actinicus

=== Genetic disorders ===
- Porphyria cutanea tarda
- Xeroderma pigmentosum

== Diagnosis ==
There are several ways in which medical professional can diagnose photodermatoses. Usually a detailed history of the patient's experience and medical history along with physical examination is sufficient for diagnosis. The medical professional takes into consideration the time since sun exposure; use of creams/makeup, medications, and contact with plants; frequency of pruritis; improvements with less exposure to sun such as during winter months; and family history of photodermatoses. Physical examinations look for signs of erythematous rashes and swelling of areas exposed to sun, including face, upper neck or back, and primary skin lesions which includes vesicle and blisters.

For diagnostic uncertainty of photodermatoses, a medical professional may use other means to diagnose. Lab studies, skin biopsy, challenge-rechallenge testing, and phototesting are some options. Challenge-rechallenge testing is done by withdrawing and reintroducing the suspected cause and checking for reaction. Phototesting is typically done by a specialist and evaluates for primary photodermatoses. It is also the method used to identify drug related photo-toxicity. There are three main methods of phototesting: Minimal erythema dose (MED) testing, Photoprovocation test, and Photopatch testing.

=== Minimal erythema dose (MED) testing ===
- Through exposure to increasing UV doses, the minimum value for UV radiation to trigger a reaction can be determined.

=== Photoprovocation test ===
- Through repeated, fixed doses of UV radiation over the course of at least three days, this test aims to reproduce a photo-sensitive reaction.

=== Photopatch testing ===
- Used to determine patient specific photallergens by applying suspected agents in pairs and then exposing one to UV radiation. The one exposed to UV radiation is then compared to the control that was not exposed to UV radiation.
