= Gron =

Gron may refer to:

== Places ==
- Gron, Cher, a commune in the department of Cher, France
- Groń, Tatra County, a village in southern Poland
- Gron, Yonne, a commune in the department of Yonne, France

== Surname ==
- Grön, a Swedish/Finnish surname (including a list of persons with the name)
- Grøn, a Danish/Norwegian surname (including a list of persons with the name)
- Gron, another surname
  - Stanislav Gron (born 1978), Slovak hockey player
- Groń, also a surname
  - Franciszek Gąsienica Groń (1931–2014), Polish athlete
