= PMLE =

PMLE may refer to:

- Polymorphous light eruption
- Progressive multifocal leukoencephalopathy
