= Solumbra =

Brand of clothing protecting from the Sun

Coordinates: 47.61237°N 122.3365°W

- Type: Private
- Industry: Retail
- Founded: 1992
- Founder: Shaun Hughes
- Headquarters: Seattle, Washington, USA
- Products: Clothing
- Website: sunprecautions.com

Solumbra is a line of sun protection clothing and patented fabric that was introduced in 1992.

== History ==
Shaun Hughes, a melanoma patient, developed the Solumbra line of fabric and clothing. He felt that traditional UV protection was insufficient, as he would tan through sunscreen and get sunburned through his summer clothing. Solumbra clothing designs are based on published medical guidelines.

Solumbra entered the United States marketplace in 1992. Solumbra was reviewed under medical device regulations by the U.S. Food and Drug Administration (FDA) and Health Canada. No previous sun protective clothing had been reviewed as a medical device in the United States or Canada. The SPF rating was tested by labs to be 50+, by journalists to be 97+, and by the manufacturer to be 100+.

== Research ==
R. Sayre was the lead researcher of in vitro SPF testing for traditional summer fabrics. This revealed that traditional summer clothing in North America offered less than 15 SPF protection, the minimum level recommended by doctors. These traditional summer fabrics tested between SPF 5–9 when dry and SPF 3–9 when wet. Nicholas Lowe and R Sayre followed this up with in vivo research to find that Solumbra achieved over 50 SPF when dry or wet.

In vivo research spearheaded by J Menter and Sayre, published in the Journal of the American Academy of Dermatology, showed that most mice contracted squamous cell carcinoma (SCC) skin cancers through typical summer fabrics, and mice protected by Solumbra fabrics did not incur skin cancers. Subsequent research by Menter and Sayre found that specific Solumbra fabrics provided photoprotection for mice against injury from visible light when sensitized with the photosensitizer, ALA, compared to insufficient protection by typical summer fabric.
