= Solar erythema =

- Specialty: Dermatology

Solar erythema is a skin condition characterized by redness of the skin following exposure to ultraviolet light, not to be confused with sunburn.

== See also ==
- Skin lesion
