= Carl Rasch =

Carl Rasch may refer to:

- Carl L. Rasch, U.S. federal judge
- Carl Rasch (physician)
