= Elephant Surf =

San Diego-based surf company

- Company type: Subsidiary
- Industry: Retail, textile
- Founded: 2010; 16 years ago
- Headquarters: San Diego, California, United States
- Area served: Worldwide
- Products: Surfwear • Streetwear
- Website: www.elephantsurf.com

Elephant Surf is a surf company based in San Diego, California, and specialized in compression shorts for surfing.

== History ==
The company was founded in 2010.

== Products ==
Elephant Surf specializes in lower body rash guards and compression shorts to wear under boardshorts. The brand is one of the major sponsors to top-10 ASP surfer Josh Kerr since 2011, with whom the company worked to design its flagship product, the Trunks: Josh Kerr Pro Model. They were termed "The Cure for Boardshort Rash" by Daily Stoke.

Elephant Surf also manufactures a short-run clothing line, consisting mainly of branded t-shirts and sweatshirts.
