= Actinic prurigo =

- Specialty: Dermatology

Actinic prurigo is a rare sunlight-induced, pruritic, papular, or nodular skin eruption. Some medical experts use the term actinic prurigo to denote a rare photodermatosis that develops in childhood and is chronic and persistent; this rare photodermatosis, associated with the human leukocyte antigen HLA-DR4, is often called "Familial polymorphous light eruption of American Indians" or "Hereditary polymorphous light eruption of American Indians" but some experts consider it to be a variant of the syndrome known as polymorphous light eruption (PMLE). Some experts use the term actinic prurigo for Hutchinson's summer prurigo (a.k.a. hydroa aestivale) and several other photodermatoses that might, or might not, be distinct clinical entities.

== Symptoms ==
AP is characterized by itchy, inflamed papules, nodules, and plaques on the skin. Lesions typically appear hours or days after exposure of the skin to UV light, and follow a general pattern of sun-exposed areas. The face, neck, arms, hands, and legs are often affected, although lesions sometimes appear on skin that is covered by clothing and thus not exposed to UV light, thus making AP somewhat difficult to diagnose.

AP is a chronic disease, and symptoms usually worsen in the spring and summer as the day lengthens and exposure to sunlight increases.

== Causes ==
The cause for actinic prurigo is unknown, however researchers believe that protein in our bodies may be a cause to the condition also: •UV-A and UV-B light seem to be the main provoking agents. This observation is supported by the fact that most patients live at high altitudes (>1000 m above sea level), and the condition improves in many patients when they move to lower altitudes. However, some patients who are affected already live at sea level.18,19,27 •Some authors are considering a food photosensitizer or a nutritional selective deficiency as a cause; however, no evidence proves this theory.27

== Treatment ==
Currently there is no cure for actinic prurigo, and treatment focuses on relieving the dermatologic symptoms, by way of topical steroid creams or systemic immunosuppressants.

Prescribed treatments include:

- topical creams such as Tacrolimus and Betamethasone.
- systemic immunosuppressants such as Prednisone.
- In some cases, Thalidomide has proven to be effective in controlling the symptoms of actinic prurigo.

All patients with AP are encouraged to minimize sun exposure, and to use strong sunscreen throughout the year, and even on cloudy or overcast days, as UVA light, unlike UVB light, is able to penetrate cloud cover and remains constant throughout the day.

Alternative treatment methods might include UV Hardening, Meditation and/or cognitive behavioral therapy. UV-A desensitization phototherapy has also been shown to be effective in cases.

== History ==
Actinic prurigo (AP) was first described by Escalona in Mexico, in 1954.

== See also ==
- Photosensitivity with HIV infection
- List of human leukocyte antigen alleles associated with cutaneous conditions
- Hydroa vacciniforme
