= Sun protective clothing =

Clothing which blocks light

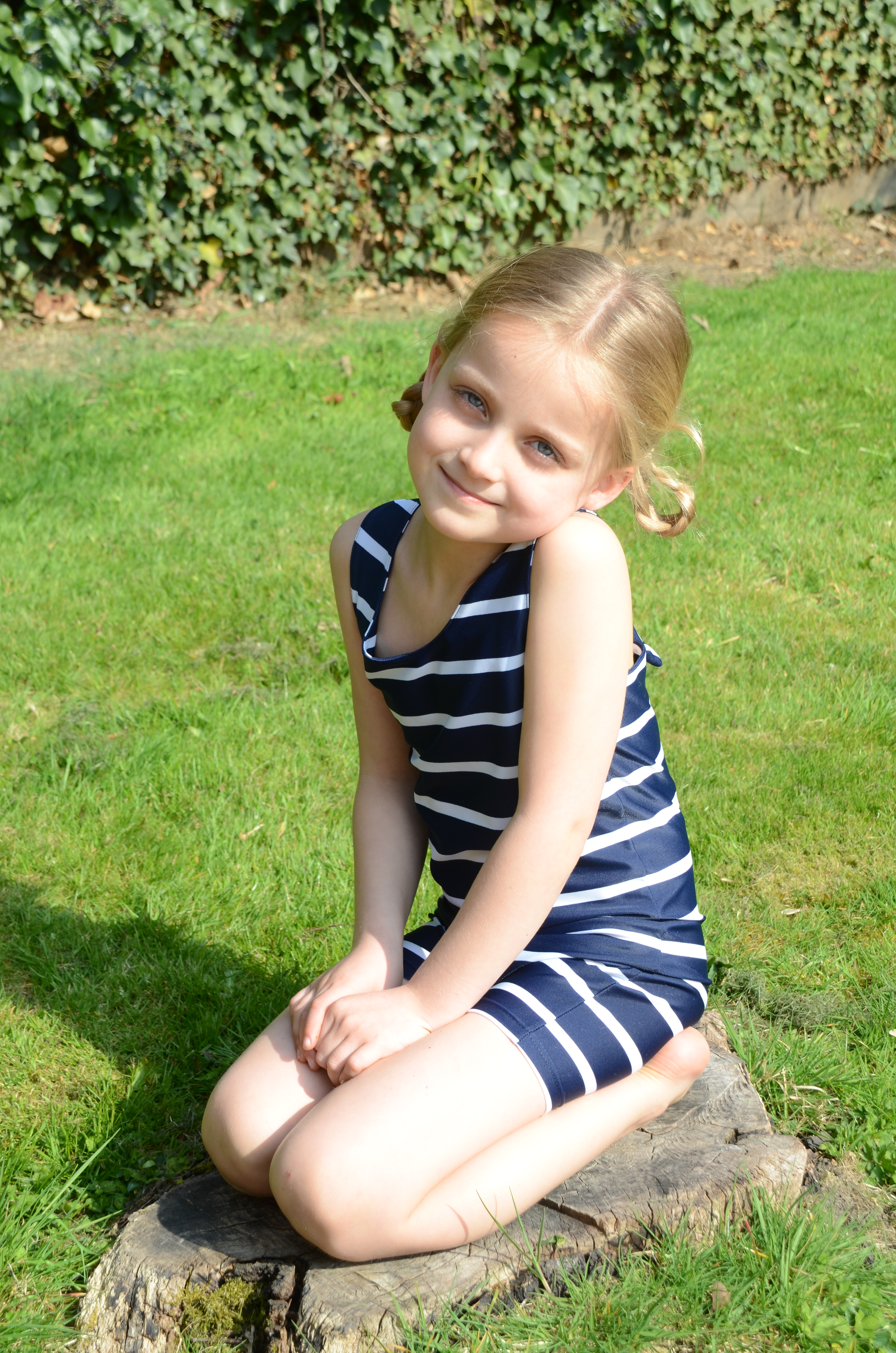
UV swimwear

Sun protective clothing is clothing specifically designed for sun protection and is produced from a fabric rated for its level of ultraviolet (UV) protection. A novel weave structure and denier (related to thread count per inch) may produce sun protective properties. In addition, some textiles and fabrics employed in the use of sun protective clothing may be pre-treated with UV-inhibiting ingredients during manufacture to enhance their effectiveness.

In addition to special fabrics, sun protective clothing may also adhere to specific design parameters, including styling appropriate to full coverage of the skin most susceptible to UV damage. Long sleeves for both sexes, ankle-length trousers for men, knee-to-floor-length skirts and dresses for women, and collars for both sexes are common styles for clothing as a sun protective measure.

Regular clothing can leave a person exposed to the damaging effects of UV radiation. However, a number of fabrics and textiles in common use today need no further UV-blocking enhancement based on their inherent fiber structure, density of weave, and dye components, especially darker colors and indigo dyes. Good examples of these fabrics contain full percentages or blends of heavy-weight natural fibers like cotton, linen and hemp or light-weight synthetics such as polyester, nylon, spandex and polypropylene. Natural or synthetic indigo-dyed denim, twill weaves, canvas and satin are also good examples. However, a significant disadvantage is the heat retention caused by heavier-weight and darker-colored fabrics.

As sun protective clothing is usually meant to be worn during warm and humid weather, some UV-blocking textiles and clothing may be designed with ventilated weaves, moisture wicking and antibacterial properties to assist in cooling and breathability.

UPF (ultraviolet protection factor) represents the ratio of sunburn-causing UV without and with the protection of the fabric, similar to SPF (sun protection factor) ratings for sunscreen. While standard summer fabrics have UPF ~6, sun protective clothing typically has UPF ~30, which means that only 1 out of ~30 units of UV will pass through (~3%).

== History ==
Although clothing has been used for protection against solar exposure for thousands of years, modern sun protective clothing was popularized (but not exclusively used) in Australia as an option or adjunct to sunscreen lotions and sunblock creams. Sun protective clothing and UV protective fabrics in Australia now follow a lab-testing procedure regulated by a Commonwealth agency: ARPANSA. This standard was established in 1996 after work by Australian swimwear companies. The British standard was established in 1998 by the National Radiological Protection Board and the British Standards Institute. Using the Australian method as a model, the US standard was formally established in 2001, and now employs a more-stringent testing protocol that includes fabric longevity, abrasion/wear and washability. UPF testing is now widely used on clothing for outdoor activities.

The original UPF rating system was enhanced in the United States by the American Society for Testing and Materials (ASTM) Committee D13.65, at the behest of the Federal Trade Commission (FTC) and the Consumer Product Safety Commission, to qualify and standardize the emerging sun protective clothing and textile industry. When the Food and Drug Administration (FDA) discontinued regulating sun-protective clothing, the Solar Protective Factory (whose CEO chaired the ASTM Committee) took the lead in developing the UPF testing protocols and labeling standards that are presently used in the United States.

In 1992, the FDA reviewed clothing that was being marketed with claims of sun protection (SPF, % UV blockage, or skin cancer prevention). Only one brand of sun protective clothing, Solumbra, was cleared under medical device regulations. The FDA initially regulated sun protective clothing as a medical device, but later transferred oversight for general sun protective clothing to the FTC. The UPF rating system may eventually be adopted by interested apparel/textile/fabric manufacturers as a "value added" program for consumer safety and awareness. Before UPF standards were in place (which directly measure a fabric's ability to block UV radiation), clothing was previously rated using SPF standards (which measure how long a person's skin takes to redden).

== Fabric ==
Factors that affect the level of sun protection provided by a fabric, in approximate order of importance, include weave, color, weight, stretch, and wetness. The less open or more dense the fabric (weave, weight, stretch), the better the protection. Getting a fabric wet reduces the protection as much as half, except for silk and viscose which can get more protective when wet. Polyester contains a benzene ring that absorbs UV light. In addition, UV absorbers may be added at various points in the manufacturing process to enhance protection levels. In 2003, chemical company BASF embedded nanoparticles of titanium dioxide into a nylon fabric, which can be used for sun protective clothing that maintains its UV protection when wet.

There is some indication that washing fabrics in detergents containing fabric brighteners, which absorb UV radiation, might increase their protective capability. Studies at the University of Alberta also indicate that darker-colored fabrics offer more protection than lighter-colored fabrics.

While there is some correlation between the percentages of visible light and UV that pass through the same fabric, it is not a strong relationship. With new-technology textiles designed for the sole purpose of UV blocking, it is not always possible to judge the UV protection level simply by holding up the fabric and examining how much visible light passes through.

Provide more protection:

- specially manufactured fabrics
- cotton viscose fabrics
- black or dark blue denim jeans
- wool garments
- satin-finished silk of any weight
- tightly woven Bamboo/Lycra fabric
- polyacrylonitrile
- 100% polyester
- shiny polyester blends
- tightly woven fabrics
- REPREVE fabric
- unbleached cotton (most cotton sold is bleached)
- bamboo/cotton blend

Provide less protection:

- polyester crepe
- bleached cotton
- viscose
- knits
- undyed/white jeans
- worn/old fabric

== UPF rating ==
A relatively new rating designation for sun protective textiles and clothing is UPF (ultraviolet protection factor), which represents the ratio of sunburn-causing UV measured without and with the protection of the fabric. For example, a fabric rated UPF 30 means that, if 30 units of UV fall on the fabric, only 1 unit will pass through to the skin. A UPF 30 fabric that blocks 29 out of 30 units of UV is therefore blocking 96.7%. Unlike SPF (sun protection factor) measurements that traditionally use human sunburn testing, UPF is measured using a laboratory instrument (spectrophotometer or spectroradiometer) and an artificial light source, and then applying a sunburn weighting curve (erythemal action spectrum) across the relevant UV wavelengths. Theoretically, human SPF testing and instrument UPF testing both generate comparable measurements of a product's ability to protect against sunburn.

Below is the ASTM Standard for Sun Protective Clothing and Swimwear:

UPF rating	Protection category	% UV radiation blocked
UPF 15–24	Good	93.3–95.9
UPF 25–39	Very good	96.0–97.4
UPF 40–50+	Excellent	97.5–98+

According to testing by Consumer Reports, UPF 30+ is typical for protective fabrics, while UPF 20 is typical for standard summer fabrics.

== UPF testing protocol ==
Developed in 1998 by Committee RA106, the testing standard for sun protective fabrics in the United States is the American Association of Textile Chemists and Colorists (AATCC) Test Method 183. This method is based on the original guidelines established in Australia in 1994.

AATCC 183 should be used in conjunction with other related standards including ASTM D 6544 and ASTM D 6603. ASTM D 6544 specifies simulating the life cycle of a fabric so that a UPF test can be done near the end of the fabric's life, when it typically provides the least UV protection. ASTM D 6603 is a consumer format recommended for visible hangtag and care labeling of sun protective clothing and textiles. A manufacturer may publish a test result to a maximum of UPF 50+.

Sun protective clothing and textile/fabric manufacturers are currently a self-regulating industry in North America, prescribed by the AATCC and ASTM methods of testing.

== See also ==
- Dress code
- Hemline
- Rash guard
- Sunglasses
- Sun hat
- Sunlight
- Umbrellas
- UV index
