= Grøn =

Grøn is a surname. Notable people with the family name or surname include:

- Amalie Grøn Hansen (born 1996), Danish handball player
- Edith Grøn (1917–1990), Danish-born Nicaraguan sculptor
- Kristian Fredrik Grøn (1855–1931), Norwegian dermatologist
- Marinus Emanuel Grøn, founder of M. E. Grøn & Søn
- Øyvind Grøn (born 1944), Norwegian physicist
