= Rash guard =

Stretch garment for protection from abrasion, UV and stings

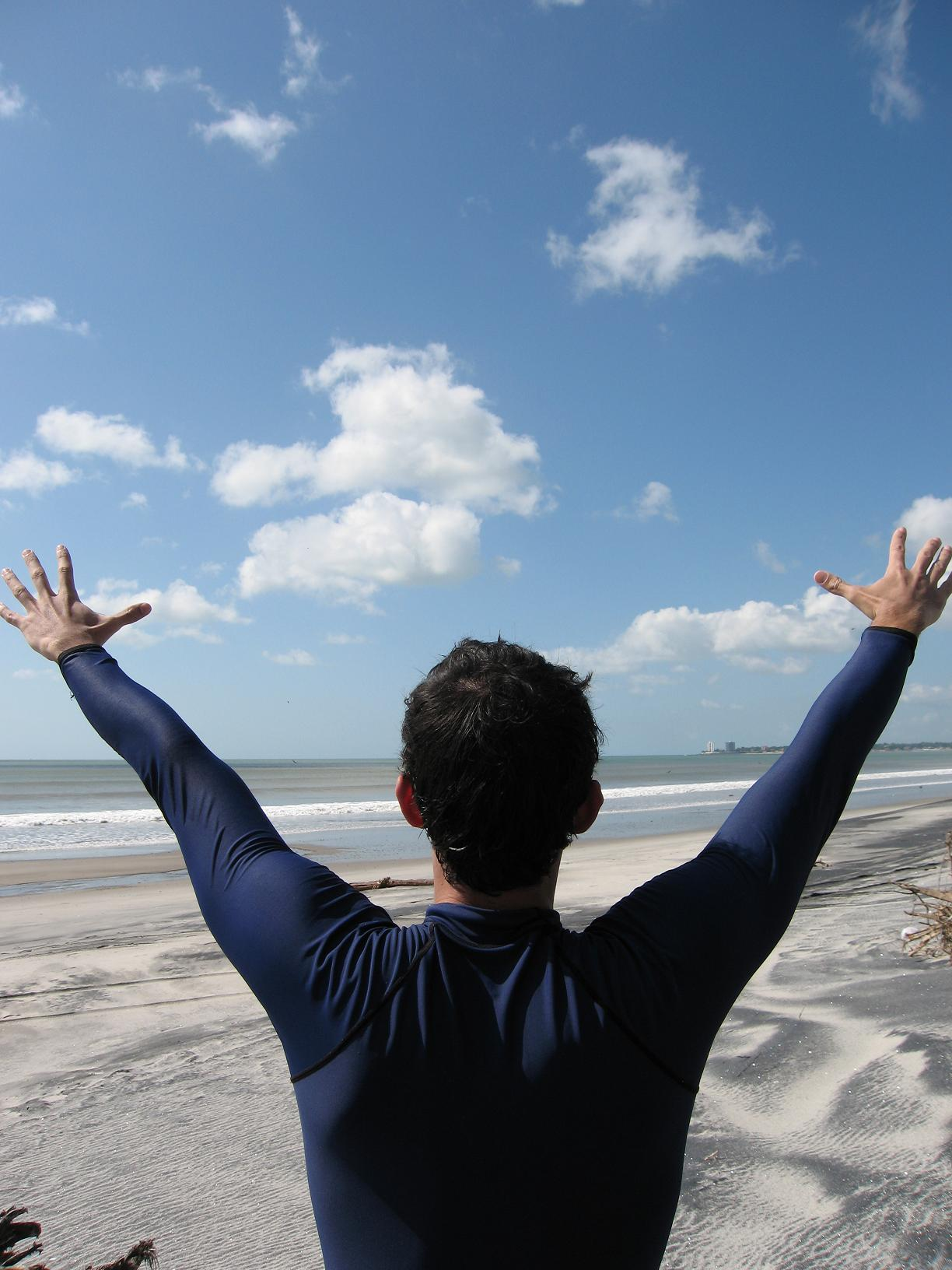
Surfing "long-sleeves" rashguard

A rash guard, also known as rash vest or rashie, is an athletic shirt made of spandex and nylon or polyester. The name rash guard reflects the fact that the shirt protects the wearer against rashes caused by abrasion, or by sunburn from extended exposure to the sun, as sun protective clothing.

== Description ==
A rash guard shirt is usually worn by itself when surfing in weather too warm for a wetsuit to prevent chafing from sliding on and off of the waxed surface of the surfboard. A surfboard's wax holds sand from the beach that can rub against a surfer while paddling out to the break, or legs while sitting atop one's board.

Rash guards also offer some protection from the sun (measured by its Ultraviolet Protection Factor) and slight protection against jellyfish stings and are sometimes worn under wetsuits to prevent chafing. A rash guard helps to prevent irritation caused by rapid impact with surface water and waves as well.

A rash guard by itself is used for light coverage in warm weather for many other watersports including surfing, canoe polo, scuba diving, snorkeling, freediving, wakeboarding, bodysurfing, bodyboarding, windsurfing, kitesurfing, kayaking, stand up paddle surfing, or swimming.

There are also lower body rash guards, which are similar to compression shorts to be worn under the surfers' boardshorts, but more specialized for surfers.

Rash guards are thought to have originated in Australia, where they are commonly referred to as "rashies" or "rashys".

Important features of a rash guard include flatlock stitching and multi-panel construction. Flatlock stitching creates a seam where the seam allowances lies flat to the garment instead of hanging loose from it. It is made by adjusting the overlock or the thread overedge stitch. Flatlock stitching increases the strength of the garment for intense exercise or recreational activities. Multi-panel construction and different material for separate body parts sewn together in panels allow the user increased mobility wet or dry versus the conventional tee shirt construction.

The combination of products used to construct a rash guard differ slightly depending on the designer. The use of nylon and spandex create a garment that is lightweight, quick drying, flexible, durable, naturally antibacterial and water wicking.

== Variations ==
Some variations include the following:

- Cropped rash guard: A rash guard that is similar to a crop top and can be worn by both women and men. It can be paired with swimwear bottoms.
- Rash guard overall/bodysuit: A hybrid one-piece swimsuit (with boyleg/short or classic bottoms) with rash guard material and design. There are designs for adults and this variation is much catered to children.

== Swim shirts ==
A woman wearing a swim shirt while surfing

Swim shirts are relatively new to the consumer market, but are growing in popularity. Like rash guards, they have anti-chafing seams and protection against the sun's UV rays and possible skin cancer, but they are generally more comfortable and casually worn like T-shirts. Thus, they serve as a simple alternative to sunscreen, which may not be used properly or trigger skin allergies or sensitivities. Many swim shirts carry a UPF rating of 50+, blocking over 98% of the sun's harmful rays.

Even though the name generally applies to water sports, people use swim shirts for an array of activities: swimming, boating, golfing, tennis, gardening, playing in the sprinklers, water parks, beach trips, pool play, rivers and lakes, water skiing, surfing, snow skiing, sledding, skimboarding, in mixed martial arts and Brazilian jiu-jitsu, and even as normal everyday clothing.

== Rash guards for grappling / mixed martial arts ==
Many practitioners wear rash guards underneath a gi or as a stand-alone garment for training in various grappling sports and mixed martial arts (MMA). The potential, but not proven, benefits for this include:

- Protect skin against mat burn.
- Moisture control.
- Compression effect on the muscles which is beneficial when it comes to preventing muscle sprain/strain.
- Good hygiene practice.

In most cases, Brazilian jiu-jitsu (BJJ) and MMA rash guards are thinner than traditional rash guards meant for surfing or diving. They also do not offer UV protection. Over the years MMA rash guards evolved and most have the following distinct features: reinforced stitching; a gel panel on the bottom of the rash guard to keep it from rolling up while sparring; fewer stitches, and a mix of 80% polyester and 20% spandex. They also carry unique designs, usually martial arts–centered but not strictly.

In competition, BJJ athletes are allowed to wear rash guards with long or short sleeves. Some organizations and promotions, like IBJJF, require the participants to wear a solid color—usually black, or black with at least 10% of their belt color. Other organizations allow the competitors to wear a rash guard of their choice. The same rule goes for gyms and academies with each one setting their own requirements from their students.

== See also ==
- Glossary of surfing
