= Photosensitivity with HIV infection =

- Specialty: Dermatology

Photosensitivity with HIV infection is a skin condition resembling polymorphous light eruption, actinic prurigo, or chronic actinic dermatitis, seen in about 5% of HIV-infected people.

== See also ==
- Skin lesion
