= Holger Haxthausen =

Danish professor of dermatology (1892–1959)

Holger Haxthausen (1892-1959) was professor of dermatology at the University of Copenhagen. He took up the position in 1931 in succession to Carl Rasch.
