= ZNF33A =

Protein-coding gene in the species Homo sapiens

Identifiers
- Aliases: ZNF33A, KOX2, KOX31, KOX5, NF11A, ZNF11, ZNF11A, ZNF33, ZZAPK, zinc finger protein 33A
- External IDs: OMIM: 194521; GeneCards: ZNF33A

Gene location (Human)
Chr.	Chromosome 10 (human)
Band	10p11.1	Start	38,010,650 bp
Band	10p11.1	End	38,065,088 bp
RNA expression pattern
Bgee	Human / Mouse (ortholog); Top expressed in: cerebellar vermis; skin of arm; tendon of biceps brachii; palpebral conjunctiva; thymus; sural nerve; epithelium of nasopharynx; urethra; endothelial cell; internal globus pallidus / n/a; More reference expression data
BioGPS	n/a
Gene ontology
Molecular function	DNA-binding transcription factor activity; DNA binding; metal ion binding; nucleic acid binding; DNA-binding transcription factor activity, RNA polymerase II-specific
Cellular component	intracellular anatomical structure; nucleus
Biological process	transcription, DNA-templated; regulation of transcription, DNA-templated; regulation of transcription by RNA polymerase II
Sources:Amigo / QuickGO
Orthologs
Databases	NCBI: entry; OMA: entry
Species	Human	Mouse
Entrez	7581	n/a
Ensembl	ENSG00000189180	n/a
UniProt	Q06730	n/a
RefSeq (mRNA)	NM_001278170; NM_001278171; NM_001278173; NM_001278174; NM_001278175 NM_001278176; NM_001278177; NM_001278178; NM_001278179; NM_006954; NM_006974; NM_001324175; NM_001324176; NM_001324177; NM_001324178	n/a
RefSeq (protein)	NP_001265099; NP_001265100; NP_001265102; NP_001265103; NP_001265104 NP_001265105; NP_001265106; NP_001265107; NP_001265108; NP_001311104; NP_001311105; NP_001311106; NP_001311107; NP_008885; NP_008905	n/a
Location (UCSC)	Chr 10: 38.01 – 38.07 Mb	n/a
PubMed search		n/a
- Wikidata
View/Edit Human

Zinc finger protein 33A is a protein that in humans is encoded by the ZNF33A gene.

== Interactions ==
ZNF33A has been shown to interact with ZAK.
