= Phototoxicity =

Chemically-induced skin irritation following exposure to light

- Other names: Photoirritation
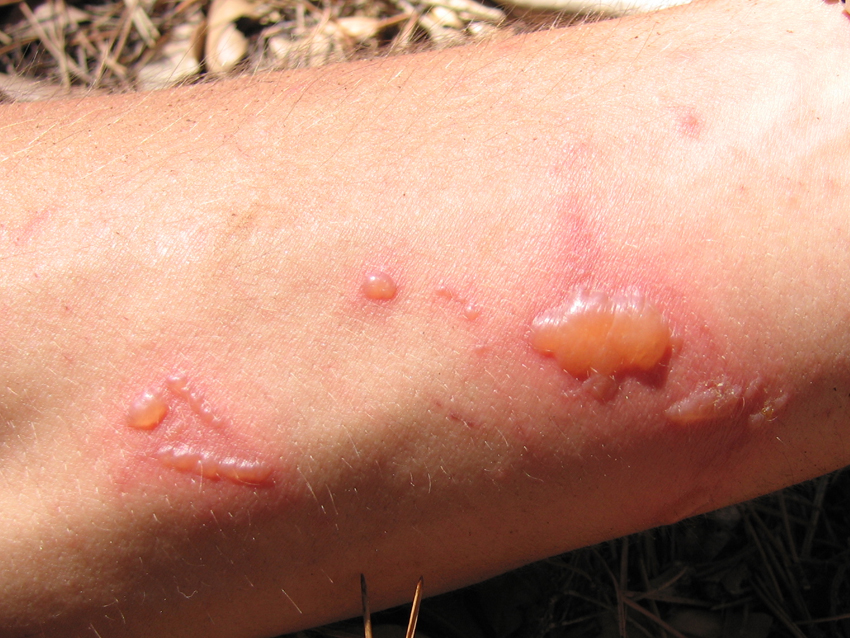
- Effect of the common rue on skin in hot weather.
- Specialty: Dermatology

Phototoxicity is a chemically induced skin irritation, requiring light, that does not involve the immune system. It is a type of photosensitivity.

The skin response resembles an exaggerated sunburn. The involved chemical may enter into the skin by topical administration, or it may reach the skin via systemic circulation following ingestion or parenteral administration. The chemical needs to be "photoactive," which means that when it absorbs light, the absorbed energy produces molecular changes that cause toxicity. Many synthetic compounds, including drug substances like tetracyclines or fluoroquinolones, are known to cause these effects. Surface contact with some such chemicals causes photodermatitis, and many plants cause phytophotodermatitis. Light-induced toxicity is a common phenomenon in humans; however, it also occurs in other animals.

== Mechanism ==
A phototoxic substance is a chemical compound which becomes toxic when exposed to light.

- Some medicines: tetracycline antibiotics, sulfonamides, amiodarone, quinolones, psoralen
- Many cold pressed citrus essential oils such as bergamot oil
- Some plant juices: parsley, lime, and hogweeds (Heracleum mantegazzianum, Heracleum sosnowskyi, Heracleum persicum)
- Porphyrins, a class of natural molecules occurring in the body and accumulating in patients with certain genetic disorders in the building chain of the red blood dye heme: porphyria

Phototoxicity is a quantum chemical phenomenon. Phototoxins are molecules with a conjugated system, often an aromatic system. They have a low-lying excited state that can be reached by excitation with visible light photons. This state can undergo intersystem crossing with neighboring molecules in tissue, converting them to toxic free radicals. These rapidly attack nearby molecules, killing cells. A typical radical is singlet oxygen, produced from regular triplet oxygen. Because free radicals are highly reactive, the damage is limited to the body part illuminated.

== Photosafety evaluation ==
=== In vitro test systems ===
3T3 Neutral Red Phototoxicity Test (OECD TG 432) – An in vitro toxicological assessment test used to determine the cytotoxicity and photo(cyto)toxicity effect of a test article to murine fibroblasts in the presence or absence of UVA light.

"The 3T3 Neutral Red Uptake Phototoxicity Assay (3T3 NRU PT) can be utilized to identify the phototoxic effect of a test substance induced by the combination of test substance and light. The test compares the cytotoxic effect of a test substance when tested after the exposure, then tested in the absence of exposure to a non-cytotoxic dose of UVA/vis light (315-400 nm). Cytotoxicity is expressed as a concentration-dependent reduction of the uptake of the vital dye - Neutral Red.

Substances that are phototoxic in vivo after systemic application and distribution to the skin, as well as compounds that could act as phototoxicants after topical application to the skin can be identified by the test. The reliability and relevance of the 3T3 NRU PT have been evaluated, and the test has been shown to be predictive when compared with acute phototoxicity effects in vivo in animals and humans." Taken with permission from This test has a sensitivity of 97.3%, a specificity of 86.7% and an accuracy of 94.2% (n=52) in the prediction of phototoxicity compared to human test results.

This test is not suitable for UVB-activated compounds or those requiring metabolism. Highly colored or insoluble compounds may be outside of the applicability domain of this test.

=== During drug development ===
Several health authorities have issued related guidance documents, which need to be considered for drug development:

- ICH (International Conference on Harmonisation of Technical Requirements for Registration of Pharmaceuticals for Human Use)
  - M3(R2) "Guidance on Nonclinical Safety Studies for the Conduct of Human Clinical Trials and Marketing Authorization for Pharmaceuticals"
  - S9 "Nonclinical Evaluation for Anticancer Pharmaceuticals"
  - S10 "Photosafety Evaluation"
- EMA (European Medicines Agency)
  - "Note for Guidance on Photosafety Testing" (revision on-hold)
  - "Question & Answers on the Note for Guidance on Photosafety Testing"
- FDA (U.S. Food and Drug Administration)
- MHLW/PMDA (Japanese Ministry of Health, Labour and Welfare / Pharmaceuticals and Medical Devices Agency)

== Phototoxicity in light microscopy ==
When performing microscopy on live samples, one needs to be aware that too high light dose can damage or kill the specimens and lead to experimental artefacts. This is particularly important in confocal and super-resolution microscopy.

== See also ==
- Photodynamic therapy
- Photoprotection
- Photosensitivity
