= Photodermatitis =

Skin condition

Sun poisoning
- Other names: Sun poisoning, photoallergy
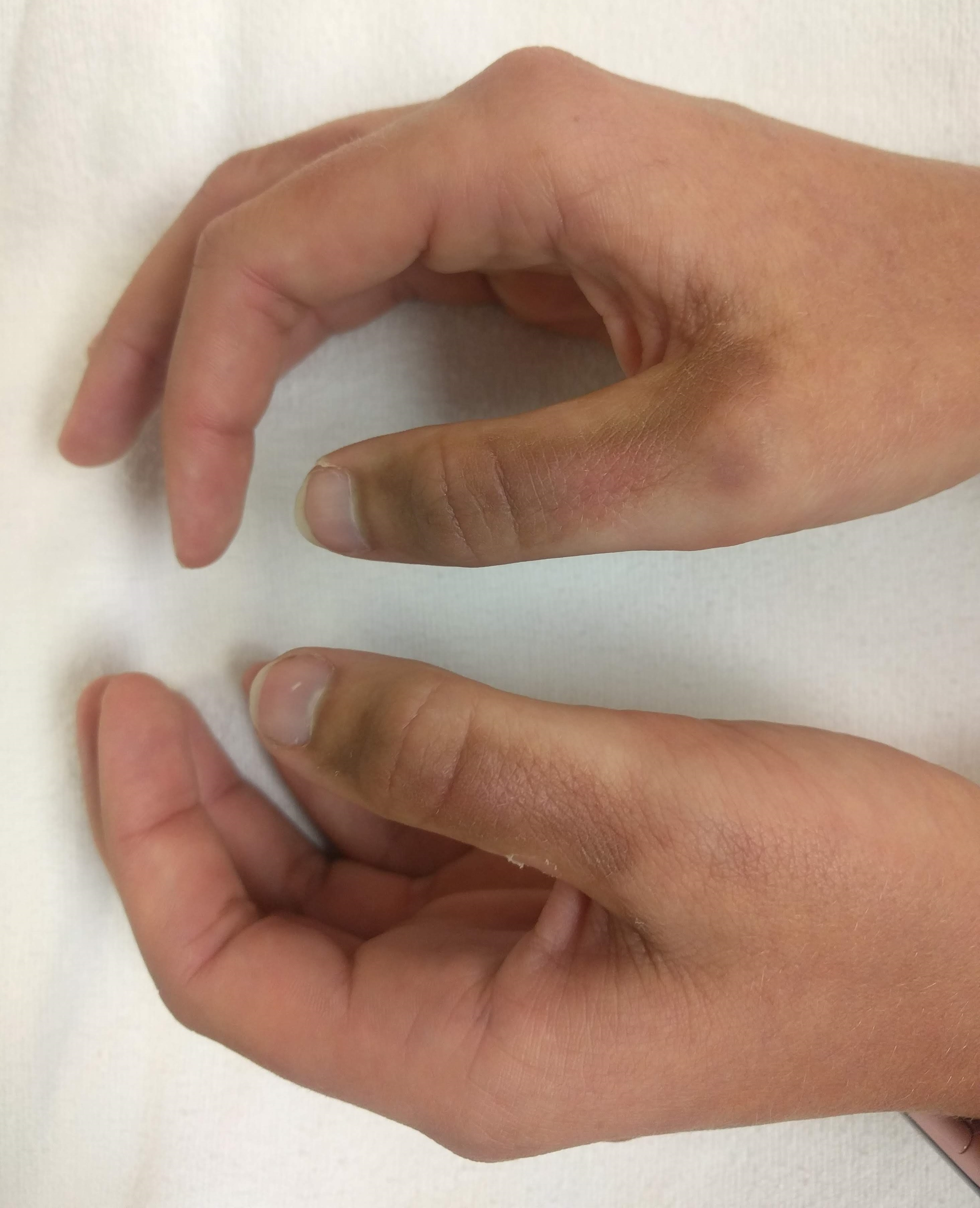
- A case of photodermatitis as a result of lemons
- Specialty: Dermatology, immunology

Photodermatitis, sometimes referred to as sun poisoning or photoallergy, is a form of allergic dermatitis in which the allergen is activated by light to sensitize the allergic response, and to cause a rash or other systemic effects on subsequent exposure. The second and subsequent exposures produce photoallergic skin conditions which are often eczematous. It is distinct from sunburn.

Some variants are caused by topical exposure, while others are caused by medications, and still others are caused by medical conditions which generate the allergen precursors in the body.

== Signs and symptoms ==
Photodermatitis may result in swelling, difficulty breathing, a burning sensation, a red itchy rash sometimes resembling small blisters, and peeling of the skin. Nausea may also occur. There may also be blotches where the itching may persist for long periods of time. In these areas an unsightly orange to brown tint may form, usually near or on the face.

== Causes ==
Many medications and conditions can cause sun sensitivity, including:

- Sulfonamides used in some drugs, among them some antibiotics, diuretics, COX-2 inhibitors, and diabetes drugs.
- Psoralens, coal tars, photo-active dyes (eosin, acridine orange).
- Musk ambrette, methylcoumarin, lemon oil (may be present in fragrances).
- PABA (found in sunscreens).
- Oxybenzone (UVA and UVB chemical blocker also in sunscreens).
- Salicylanilide (found in industrial cleaners).
- St John's wort.
- Hexachlorophene (found in some prescription antibacterial soaps).
- Tetracycline antibiotics (e.g., tetracycline, doxycycline, minocycline).
- Benzoyl peroxide.
- Retinoids (e.g., isotretinoin).
- Some NSAIDs (e.g., ibuprofen, naproxen sodium).
- Fluoroquinolone antibiotic: Sparfloxacin in 2% of cases.
- Amiodarone, used to treat atrial fibrillation.

Non-medication conditions that can cause it include:

- Porphyria
- Lupus
- Pellagra (Vitamin B3 deficiency)

Photodermatitis can also be caused by plants such as Ammi majus, parsnip, giant hogweed (Heracleum mantegazzianum), common rue (Ruta graveolens), and Dictamnus, a genus of flowering plants in the family Rutaceae with a single species Dictamnus albus, commonly called the burning bush. Photodermatitis caused by plants is called phytophotodermatitis.

== Prevention ==
Prevention includes avoiding exposure to chemicals that can trigger the reaction, such as by wearing gloves, or avoiding sunlight or wearing sunscreen preferably with at least factor 30 and with a high UVA protection level on the affected area. And by addressing any risk factors, such as those listed above.

== See also ==
- Phytophotodermatitis
- Photosensitivity
- Solar urticaria
