= Sunburn =

Burning of the skin by the sun's radiation

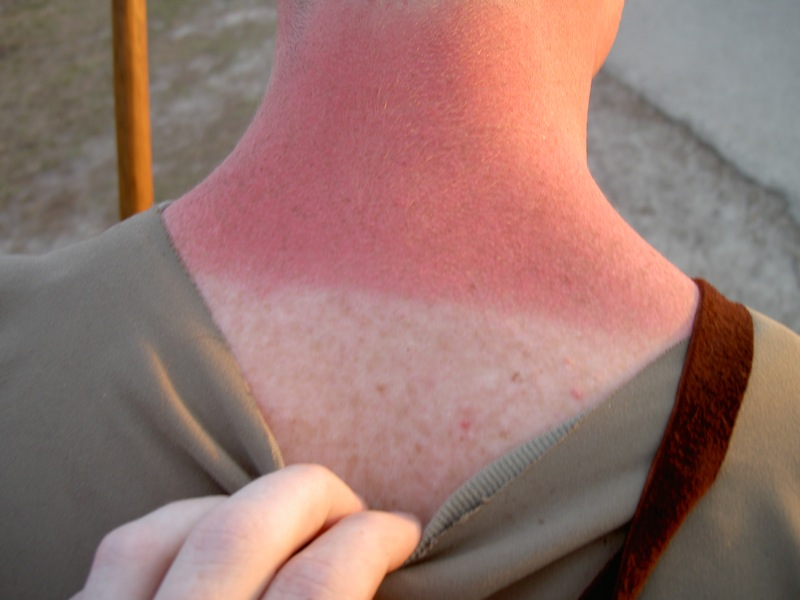
- A sunburned neck
- Specialty: Dermatology
- Complications: Skin cancer
- Risk factors: Working outdoors, skin unprotected by clothes or sunscreen, skin type, age, albinism
- Prevention: Use of sunscreen, wearing sun protective clothing
- Treatment: Avoiding further exposure to the sun. Cool, frequent baths or showers for pain relief. Anti-inflammatory medications such as ibuprofen or aspirin can also help with pain. Drinking water to stay hydrated.

Sunburn is a form of radiation burn that affects living tissue, such as skin, and that results from an overexposure to ultraviolet (UV) radiation, usually from the Sun. Common symptoms in humans and other animals include red or reddish skin that is hot to the touch or painful, general fatigue, and mild dizziness. Other symptoms include blistering, peeling skin, swelling, itching, and nausea. Excessive UV radiation is the leading cause of (primarily) non-malignant skin tumors, which in extreme cases can be life-threatening. Sunburn is an inflammatory response in the tissue triggered by the nucleic acid damage caused by UV radiation.

Sun protective measures like sunscreen and sun protective clothing are widely accepted to prevent sunburn and some types of skin cancer. Special populations, including children, are especially susceptible to sunburn and protective measures should be used to prevent damage.

== Signs and symptoms ==
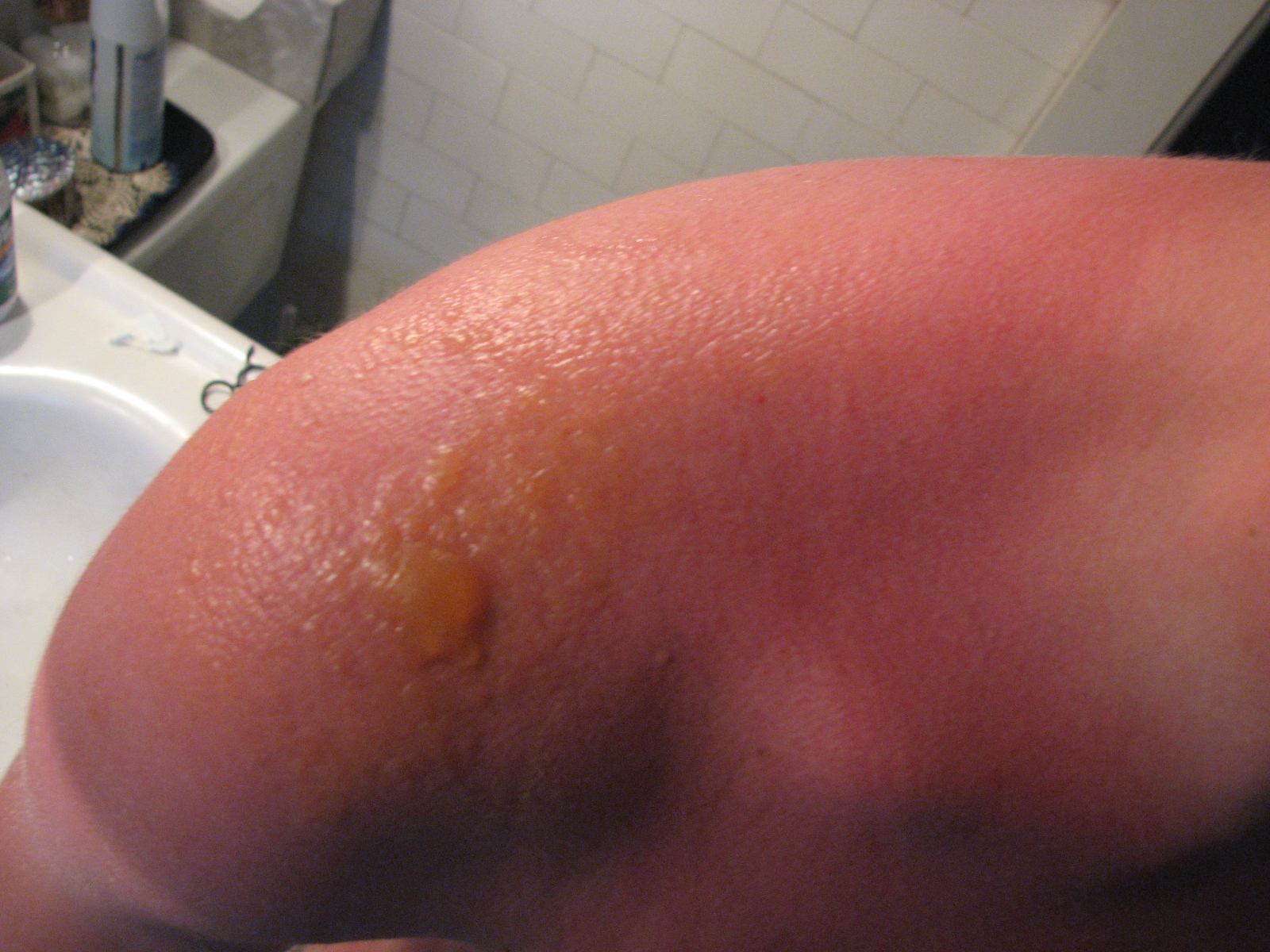
Blisters on a sunburned shoulder

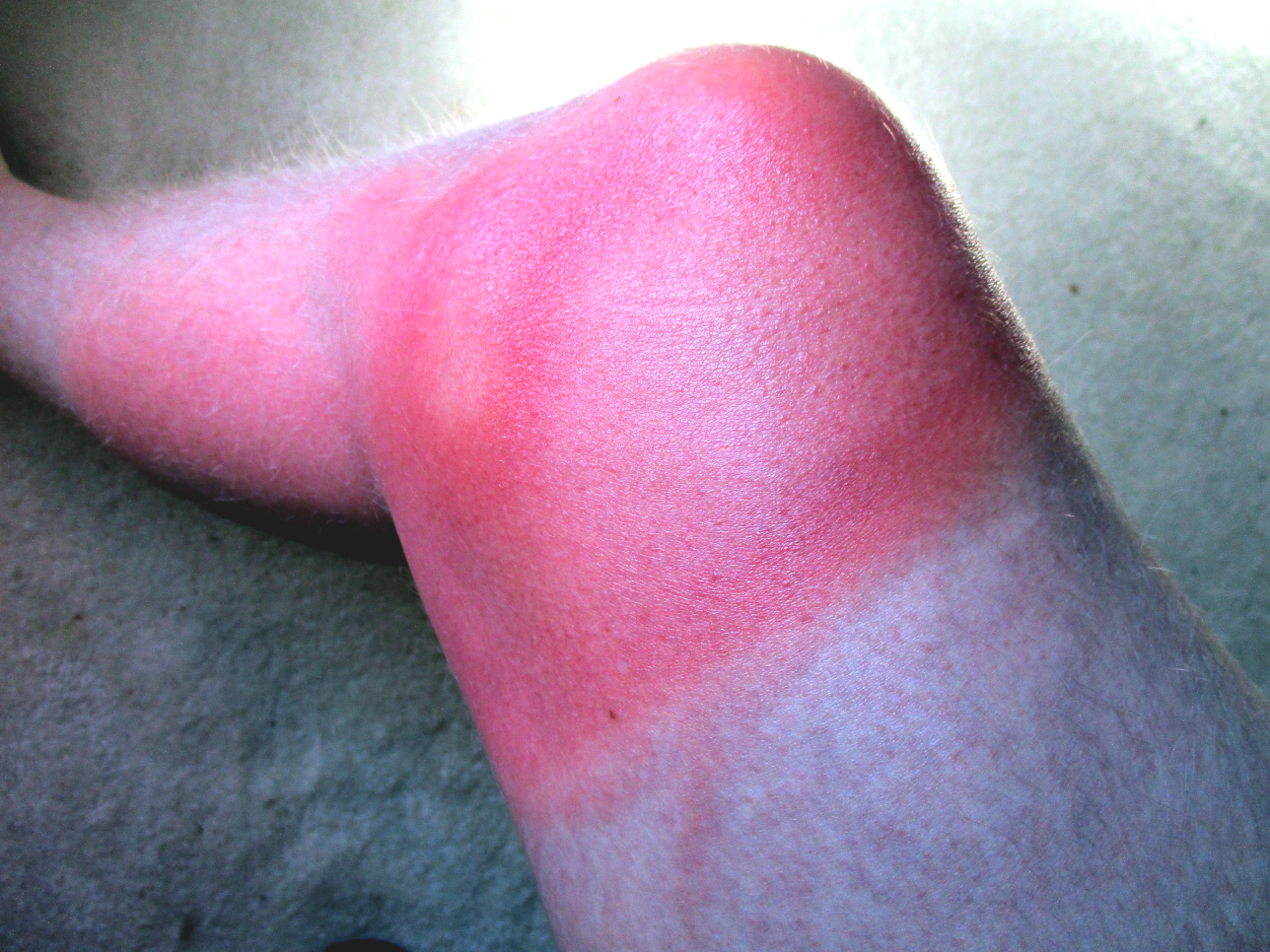
A sunburned leg below the shorts line

Sunburn will show as varying degrees of skin redness (erythema) and swelling, depending on the extent and severity of sun exposure. Severe sunburn can cause blistering, itching, peeling skin, rash, and even nausea, fever, chills, and fainting, and so is sometimes informally termed sun poisoning. Capillaries close to the sunburned skin surface produce heat, making the affected area warm to the touch. Sunburns may be classified as superficial or partial-thickness burns. Blistering is a sign of second-degree sunburn.

=== Variations ===
Minor sunburns typically cause nothing more than slight redness and tenderness to the affected areas. In more serious cases, blistering can occur. Extreme sunburns can be painful to the point of debilitation and may require hospital care.

=== Duration ===
Sunburn can occur in less than 15 minutes in response to sun exposure. However, the first signs of damage may not appear for a few hours. Sunburn can occur in seconds when exposed to non-shielded welding arcs or other sources of intense ultraviolet light.

Sunburn symptoms are typically at their worst 24 to 36 hours after sun exposure and usually begin to improve after 3 to 5 days. After a few days, the skin may start to flake and peel, with full healing typically occurring within 7 days. Small amounts of skin may continue to peel for days or even weeks after.

=== Skin cancer ===
Ultraviolet radiation causes sunburns and increases the risk of three types of skin cancer: melanoma, basal-cell carcinoma and squamous-cell carcinoma. Of greatest concern is that the melanoma risk increases dose-dependently proportional to the number of a person's lifetime cumulative episodes of sunburn. An estimated 1/3 of melanomas in the United States and Australia could be prevented with regular sunscreen use.

== Mechanism ==
Sunburn is caused by prolonged exposure to ultraviolet radiation from the Sun or artificial sources such as tanning lamps, welding arcs, or ultraviolet germicidal irradiation. Two types of ultraviolet radiation from the Sun reach the Earth's surface, UVA and UVB. UVA is 1,000–2,000 times less effective at causing sunburn than UVB, as it has less energy.

UVB damages mRNA. mRNA damage initially triggers a response in ribosomes through a protein known as ZAK-alpha in a stress response. This response acts as a cell surveillance system. Following this, detection of RNA damage leads to inflammatory signaling and recruitment of immune cells. RNA damage, but not DNA damage, results in UVB induced skin inflammation and acute sunburn.

The stress also triggers several defense mechanisms, including DNA repair to revert the damage, apoptosis and peeling to remove irreparably damaged skin cells, and increased melanin production to prevent future damage.

Melanin readily absorbs UV wavelength light. By preventing UV photons from disrupting chemical bonds, melanin inhibits both the direct alteration of DNA, as well as the generation of free radicals, to prevent them from indirectly damaging DNA. However, human melanocytes contain over 2,000 genomic sites that are highly sensitive to UV, and such sites can be up to 170-fold more sensitive to UV induction of cyclobutane pyrimidine dimers than the average site.

Sunburn causes an inflammation process that includes the production of prostanoids and bradykinin. These chemical compounds increase sensitivity to heat by reducing the threshold of heat receptor (TRPV1) activation from 109 °F (43 °C) to 85 °F (29 °C). The pain may be caused by the overproduction of a protein called CXCL5, which activates nerve fibers.

== Risk factors ==
The most significant risk factor for sunburn is the duration and intensity of UV exposure to the skin. The face, neck and trunk are two to four times more sensitive than the extremities. Additionally, individuals with lighter skin tones or those on specific medications are more susceptible to experiencing sunburn.

=== UV intensity ===
The UV Index indicates the risk of sunburn at a given time and location. Contributing factors include:

1. The time of day. In most locations, the sun's rays are strongest between approximately 10 am and 4 pm daylight saving time.
2. Cloud cover. Clouds partially block UV, but even on an overcast day, a significant percentage of the sun's damaging UV radiation can pass through clouds.
3. Proximity to reflective surfaces, such as water, sand, concrete, snow, and ice. All of these reflect the sun's rays and can cause sunburns.
4. The season of the year. The Sun's position in late spring and early summer can cause a more-severe sunburn.
5. Altitude. At a higher altitude, it is easier to become burnt, because there is less of the Earth's atmosphere to block the sunlight. UV exposure increases about 4% for every 1000 ft (305 m) gain in elevation.
6. Proximity to the equator (latitude). Between the polar and tropical regions, the closer to the equator, the more direct sunlight passes through the atmosphere over a year. For example, the southern United States gets fifty percent more sunlight than the northern United States.

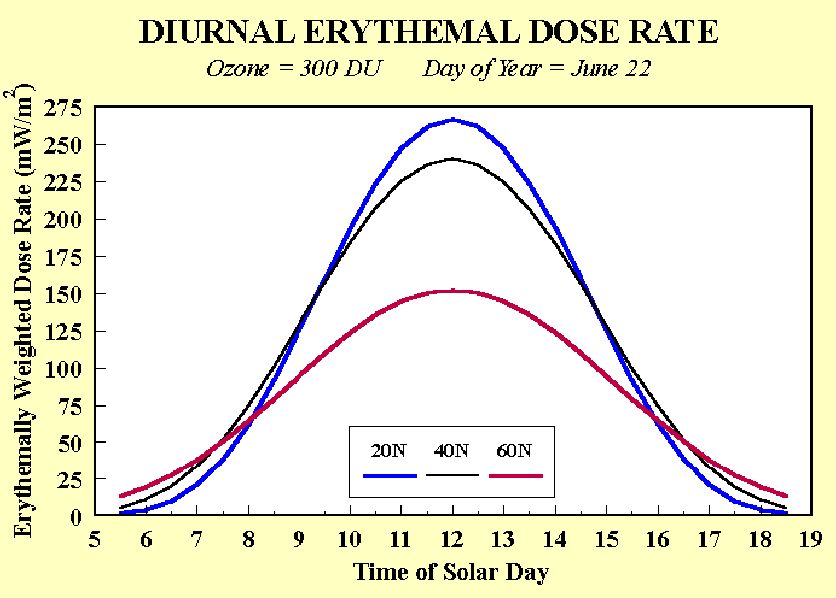
Erythemal dose rate at three Northern latitudes. (Divide by 25 to obtain the UV Index.) Source: NOAA.

Because of variations in the intensity of UV radiation passing through the atmosphere, the risk of sunburn increases with proximity to the tropic latitudes, located between 23.5° north and south latitude. All else being equal (e.g., cloud cover, ozone layer, terrain, etc.), each location within the tropic or polar regions receives approximately the same amount of UV radiation over a year. In the temperate zones between 23.5° and 66.5°, UV radiation varies substantially by latitude and season. The higher the latitude, the lower the intensity of the UV rays. Sun intensity in the northern hemisphere is greatest during May, June and July—and in the southern hemisphere, November, December and January. On a minute-by-minute basis, the amount of UV radiation depends on the Sun's angle. Ultraviolet radiation is easily determined by the height ratio of any object to the size of its shadow. Height is measured parallel to the Earth's gravitational field and the projected shadow is measured on a flat, level surface. For objects wider than skulls or poles, the height and length are best measured relative to the same occluding edge. The most significant risk is at solar noon when shadows are at their minimum, and the Sun's radiation passes most directly through the atmosphere. Regardless of one's latitude (assuming no other variables), equal shadow lengths mean equal amounts of UV radiation.

The skin and eyes are most sensitive to damage by UV at 265–275 nm wavelength, which is in the lower UVC band that is rarely encountered except from artificial sources like welding arcs. Longer wavelengths of UV radiation cause most sunburn because those wavelengths are more prevalent in ground-level sunlight.

=== Skin type ===
Skin type determines the ease of sunburn. People with lighter skin tones and limited capacity to develop a tan after UV radiation exposure have a greater risk of sunburn. Fitzpatrick's skin phototype system describes the normal variations of human skin responses to doses of UVB radiation. Persons with type I skin have the greatest capacity to sunburn, and type VI have the least capacity to burn. However, all skin types can develop sunburn or skin cancer.

Fitzpatrick's skin phototypes are as follows:

- Type 0: Albino.
- Type I: Pale light skin, burns easily, does not tan.
- Type II: Light skin, burns easily, tans with difficulty.
- Type III: Light beige skin, may burn, but eventually tans easily.
- Type IV: Light brown skin, hardly burns, tans easily.
- Type V: Brown skin, usually does not burn, tans easily.
- Type VI: Dark brown skin, very unlikely to burn, becomes darker with UV radiation exposure.

=== Tanning ===
Suntans, which naturally develop in some individuals as a protective mechanism against the sun, are viewed by most in the Western world as desirable. Tanning has led to an increased exposure to UV radiation from both the natural sun and tanning lamps. Suntans can provide a modest sun protection factor (SPF) of 3, meaning that tanned skin would tolerate up to three times the UV exposure as pale skin.

Sunburns associated with indoor tanning can be severe. The World Health Organization, American Academy of Dermatology, and the Skin Cancer Foundation have recommended avoiding artificial UV sources such as tanning beds. Suntans are not recommended as a form of sun protection.

=== Ozone depletion ===
In recent decades, the incidence and severity of sunburn have increased worldwide, partly because of chemical damage to the atmosphere's ozone layer. Between the 1970s and the 2000s, average stratospheric ozone decreased by approximately 4%, contributing an approximate 4% increase to the average UV intensity at the Earth's surface. Ozone depletion and the seasonal "ozone hole" have led to much larger changes in some locations, especially in the southern hemisphere.

=== Medication ===
The risk of sunburn can be increased by pharmaceutical products that sensitize users to UV radiation. Certain antibiotics, oral contraceptives, antidepressants, acne medications, Anticonvulsants, Antipsychotics and Mood stabilizers have this effect.

=== Other factors ===
Age also affects how skin reacts to the sun. Children younger than six and adults older than sixty are more sensitive to sunlight.

Certain genetic conditions, for example, xeroderma pigmentosum, increase a person's susceptibility to sunburn and subsequent skin cancers. These conditions involve defects in DNA repair mechanisms which decrease the ability to repair DNA damaged by UV radiation.

== Diagnosis ==
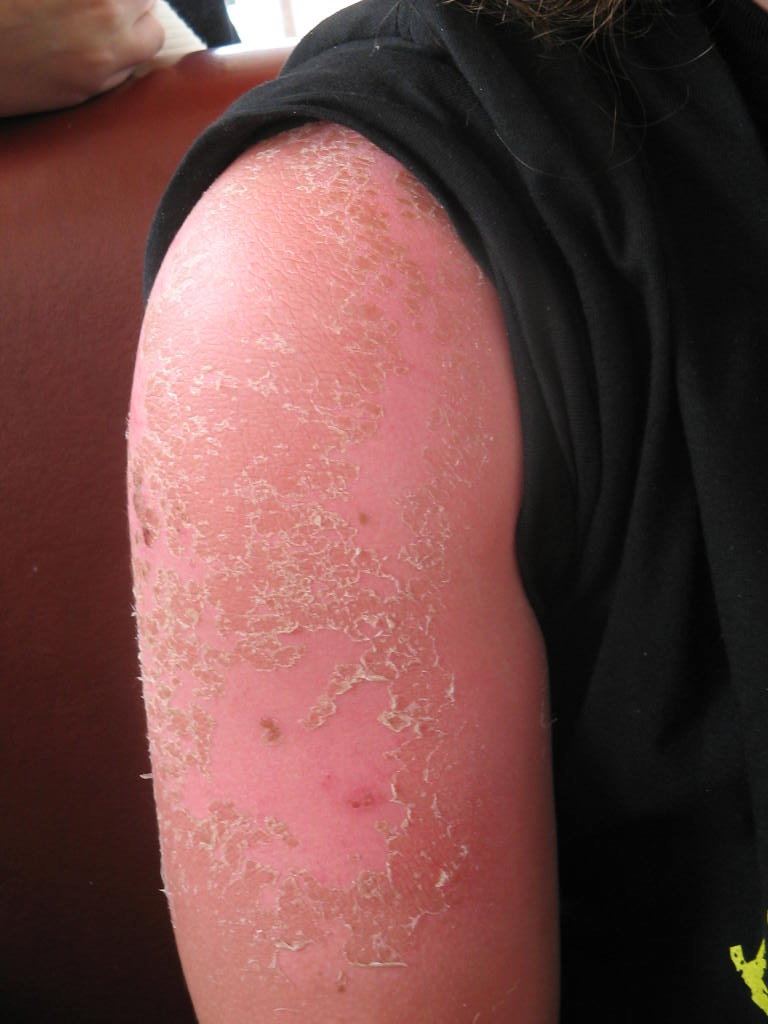
Skin peeling on the upper arm as a result of sunburn – the destruction of lower layers of the epidermis causes rapid loss of the top layers.

The differential diagnosis of sunburn includes other skin pathology induced by UV radiation, including photoallergic reactions, phototoxic reactions to topical or systemic medications, and other dermatologic disorders that are aggravated by exposure to sunlight. Considerations for diagnosis include duration and intensity of UV exposure, topical or systemic medication use, history of dermatologic disease, and nutritional status.

- Phototoxic reactions: Non-immunological response to sunlight interacting with certain drugs and chemicals in the skin which resembles an exaggerated sunburn. Common medications that may cause a phototoxic reaction include amiodarone, dacarbazine, fluoroquinolones, 5-fluorouracil, furosemide, nalidixic acid, phenothiazines, psoralens, retinoids, sulfonamides, sulfonylureas, tetracyclines, thiazides, and vinblastine.
- Photoallergic reactions: Uncommon immunological response to sunlight interacting with certain drugs and chemicals in the skin. When in an excited state by UVR, these drugs and chemicals form free radicals that react to form functional antigens and induce a Type IV hypersensitivity reaction. These drugs include 6-methylcoumarin, aminobenzoic acid and esters, chlorpromazine, promethazine, diclofenac, sulfonamides, and sulfonylureas. Unlike phototoxic reactions which resemble exaggerated sunburns, photoallergic reactions can cause intense itching and can lead to thickening of the skin.
- Phytophotodermatitis: UV radiation induces skin inflammation after contact with certain plants (including limes, celery, and meadow grass). Causes pain, redness, and blistering of the skin in the distribution of plant exposure.
- Polymorphic light eruption: Recurrent abnormal reactions to UVR present in various ways, including pink-to-red bumps, blisters, plaques and urticaria.
- Solar urticaria: A rare allergic reaction to the sun that occurs within minutes of exposure and fades within hours.
- Other skin diseases exacerbated by sunlight: Several dermatologic conditions can increase in severity with exposure to UVR. These include systemic lupus erythematosus (SLE), dermatomyositis, acne, atopic dermatitis, and rosacea.

Additionally, since sunburn is a type of radiation burn, it can initially hide a severe exposure to radioactivity. Excess radiation exposure may result in acute radiation syndrome or other radiation-induced illnesses, especially in sunny conditions. For instance, the difference between the erythema caused by sunburn and other radiation burns is not immediately obvious. Symptoms common to heat illness and the prodromic stage of acute radiation syndrome like nausea, vomiting, fever, weakness/fatigue, dizziness or seizure can add to further diagnostic confusion.

== Treatment ==
The primary measure of treatment is avoiding further exposure to the sun. The best treatment for most sunburns is time; most sunburns heal completely within a few weeks.

The American Academy of Dermatology recommends the following for the treatment of sunburn:

- For pain relief, take cool baths or showers frequently.
- Use soothing moisturizers that contain aloe vera or soy.
- Anti-inflammatory medications such as ibuprofen or aspirin can help with pain.
- Keep hydrated and drink extra water.
- Do not pop blisters on a sunburn; let them heal on their own instead.
- Protect sunburned skin (see: Sun protective clothing and Sunscreen) with loose clothing when going outside to prevent further damage while not irritating the sunburn.

Non-steroidal anti-inflammatory drugs (NSAIDs; such as ibuprofen or naproxen), and aspirin may decrease redness and pain. Local anesthetics such as benzocaine, however, are contraindicated. Schwellnus et al. state that topical steroids (such as hydrocortisone cream) do not help with sunburns, although the American Academy of Dermatology says they can be used on especially sore areas. While lidocaine cream (a local anesthetic) is often used as a sunburn treatment, there is little evidence for the effectiveness of such use.

A home treatment that may help the discomfort is using cool and wet cloths on the sunburned areas. Applying soothing lotions that contain aloe vera to sunburned areas was supported by multiple studies. However, others have found aloe vera to have no effect. Note that aloe vera cannot protect people from new or further sunburn. Another home treatment is using a moisturizer that contains soy. Furthermore, sunburn draws fluid to the skin's surface and away from the rest of the body. Drinking extra water is recommended to help prevent dehydration.

== Prevalence ==
Sunburn is common, particularly among younger adults. Nearly 75% of adolescents and young adults in the United States and over 50% in northern European countries have experienced sunburn.

== Prevention ==
The most effective way to prevent sunburn is to reduce the amount of UV radiation reaching the skin. The World Health Organization, American Academy of Dermatology, and Skin Cancer Foundation recommend the following measures to prevent excessive UV exposure and skin cancer:

- Limiting sun exposure between the hours of 10 am and 4 pm, when UV rays are the strongest
- Seeking shade when UV rays are most intense
- Wearing sun-protective clothing, including a wide-brim hat, sunglasses, and tightly woven, loose-fitting clothing
- Using sunscreen
- Avoiding tanning beds and artificial UV exposure

=== Erythemal action spectrum ===
Sunburn effect (as measured by the UV Index) is the product of the sunlight spectrum at the Earth's surface (radiation intensity) and the erythemal action spectrum (skin sensitivity). Long-wavelength UV is more prevalent, but each milliwatt at 295 nm produces almost 100 times more sunburn than at 315 nm.

The erythemal action spectrum is a standardized weighting function that codifies the skin's acute inflammatory response (redness) to ultraviolet radiation. Strictly defined by the Minimum Erythema Dose (MED)—the energy required to produce perceptible redness at 24 hours—this model serves as a widely used proxy for biological damage. While it correlates closely with direct DNA damage in the high-energy UV-B range, it is an imperfect metric for total pathology; it disproportionately discounts lower-energy UV-A wavelengths which contribute to long-term carcinogenesis and photoaging without necessarily triggering the immediate "alarm" of visible sunburn. Crucially, this crude biological proxy characterizes "UV intensity" as a medical hazard, as distinguished from "UV intensity" in the raw from environmental physics, separating the biological effective dose from simple radiative flux.

=== UV intensity ===
Levels of ozone at various altitudes (DU/km) and blocking of different bands of ultraviolet radiation: In essence, all UVC is blocked by diatomic oxygen (100–200 nm) or by ozone (triatomic oxygen) (200–280 nm) in the atmosphere. The ozone layer then blocks most UVB. Meanwhile, UVA is hardly affected by ozone, and most of it reaches the ground. UVA makes up almost all UV light that penetrates the Earth's atmosphere.

The strength of sunlight is published in many locations as a UV Index. Sunlight is generally strongest when the Sun is close to the highest point in the sky. Due to time zones and daylight saving time, this is not necessarily at 12 pm, but often one to two hours later. Seeking shade using umbrellas and canopies can reduce UV exposure, but does not block all UV rays. The World Health Organization (WHO) recommends following the shadow rule: "Watch your shadow – Short shadow, seek shade!"

=== Sunscreen ===
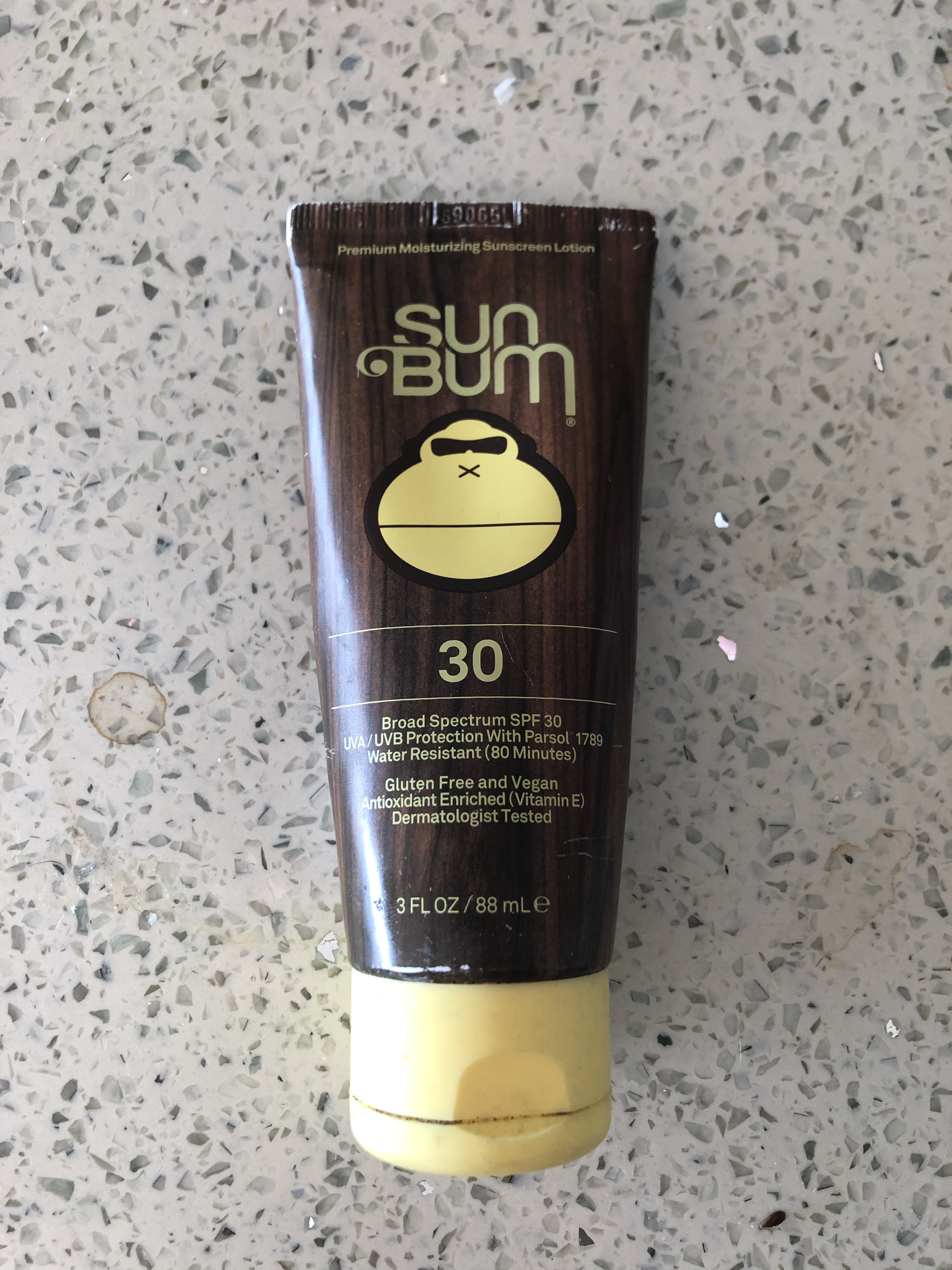
A tube of SPF 30 sunscreen on sale in the United States

Commercial preparations that block UV light are known as sunscreens or sunblocks. They have a sun protection factor (SPF) rating based on the sunblock's ability to suppress sunburn: The higher the SPF rating, the lower the amount of direct DNA damage. The stated protection factors are correct only if 2 mg of sunscreen is applied per square cm of exposed skin, which translates into about 28 mL (1 oz) to cover the whole body of an adult male. The recommended dose is much more than many people use in practice. Sunscreens function as chemicals such as oxybenzone and dioxybenzone (organic sunscreens) or opaque materials such as zinc oxide or titanium oxide (inorganic sunscreens) that mainly absorb UV radiation. Chemical and mineral sunscreens vary in the wavelengths of UV radiation blocked. Broad-spectrum sunscreens contain filters that protect against UVA radiation as well as UVB. Although UVA radiation does not primarily cause sunburn, it contributes to skin aging and increases skin cancer risk.

Sunscreen is effective and thus recommended for preventing melanoma and squamous cell carcinoma. There is little evidence that it is effective in preventing basal cell carcinoma. Typical use of sunscreen does not usually result in vitamin D deficiency, but extensive usage may.

==== Recommendations ====
Research has shown that the best sunscreen protection is achieved by application 15 to 30 minutes before exposure, followed by one reapplication 15 to 30 minutes after exposure begins. Further reapplication is necessary after activities such as swimming, sweating, and rubbing. Recommendations are product dependent varying from 80 minutes in water to hours based on the indications and protection shown on the label. The American Academy of Dermatology recommends the following criteria in selecting a sunscreen:

- Broad spectrum: protects against both UVA and UVB rays
- SPF 30 or higher
- Water resistant: sunscreens are classified as water resistant based on time, either 40 minutes, 80 minutes, or not water resistant

=== Eyes ===
The eyes are also sensitive to sun exposure at about the same UV wavelengths as skin; snow blindness is sunburn of the cornea. Wrap-around sunglasses or the use by spectacle-wearers of glasses that block UV light reduce harmful radiation. UV light has been implicated in the development of age-related macular degeneration, pterygium and cataracts.

=== Lips ===
The lips can become chapped (cheilitis) by sun exposure. Sunscreen on the lips does not have a pleasant taste and might be removed by saliva. Some lip balms (ChapSticks) have SPF ratings and contain sunscreens.

=== Feet ===
The skin of the feet is often tender and protected, so sudden prolonged exposure to UV radiation can be particularly painful and damaging to the top of the foot. Protective measures include sunscreen, socks, or swimwear that covers the foot.

=== Diet ===
Dietary factors influence susceptibility to sunburn, recovery from sunburn, and risk of secondary complications. Several dietary antioxidants, including essential vitamins, are effective in protecting against sunburn and skin damage associated with ultraviolet radiation, in both human and animal studies. Supplementation with Vitamin C and Vitamin E was shown in one study to reduce the amount of sunburn after a controlled amount of UV exposure. A review of scientific literature through 2007 found that beta carotene (Vitamin A) supplementation had a protective effect against sunburn. The effects of beta carotene were only evident in the long-term, with studies of supplementation for periods less than ten weeks in duration failing to show any effects. There is also evidence that common foods may have some protective ability against sunburn if taken for a period before exposure.

=== Protecting children ===
Babies and children are particularly susceptible to UV damage which increases their risk of both melanoma and non-melanoma skin cancers later in life. Children should not sunburn at any age, and protective measures can reduce their future risk of skin cancer.

- Infants 0–6 months: Children under 6mo generally have skin too sensitive for sunscreen and protective measures should focus on avoiding excessive UV exposure by using window mesh covers, wide-brim hats, loose clothing that covers the skin, and reducing UV exposure between the hours of 10am and 4pm.
- Infants 6–12 months: Sunscreen can safely be used on infants this age. It is recommended to apply a broad-spectrum, water-resistant SPF 30+ sunscreen to exposed areas and avoid excessive UV exposure by using wide-brim hats and protective clothing.
- Toddlers and Preschool-aged children: Apply a broad-spectrum, water-resistant SPF 30+ sunscreen to exposed areas, use wide-brim hats and sunglasses, avoid peak UV intensity hours of 10 am - 4 pm and seek shade. Sun-protective clothing with an SPF rating can also provide additional protection.

=== Artificial UV exposure ===
The World Health Organization (WHO) recommends that artificial UV exposure, including tanning beds, should be avoided as no safe dose has been established. Special protective clothing (for example, welding helmets/shields) should be worn when exposed to any artificial source of occupational UV. Such sources can produce UVB and UVC, which are mostly to completely filtered out by the atmosphere. They are extremely damaging and carcinogenic wavelengths of UV, that are absorbed mostly in the epidermis by interactions with major cellular biomolecules such as DNA and proteins.

== See also ==
- Sun tanning
- Freckles
- Skin cancer
- Snow blindness
- Chapped lips
