= Chronic actinic dermatitis =

Dermatological condition

- Other names: chronic photosensitivity dermatitis; actinic reticuloid; persistent light reactivity; photosensitive eczema
- Specialty: Dermatology

Chronic actinic dermatitis is a condition characterized by chronic skin inflammation due to sunlight or artificial light. It is similar to solar urticaria or cholinergic urticaria. Patients often have related skin conditions that cause dermatitis in response to a variety of stimuli, including flowers, sunscreens, and cosmetics.

== Symptoms ==
Common symptoms of chronic actinic dermatitis include burning, itching, swelling, and pain in the affected areas. Affected areas of the skin may have the appearance of a sunburn, even when clothing is worn and the skin is protected. Symptoms may begin several days after light exposure. There is no known reaction to moonlight, but reflections of sunlight from windows and mirrors are known to cause damage.

== Diagnosis ==
Diagnosis of chronic actinic dermatitis can occur at any age. Tests performed by a dermatologist can help determine the nature and cause of the condition.

Reactions typically vary depending on the severity of the case, with outbreaks typically occurring shortly (or within 24 hours) after direct or indirect exposure to UV light. Common reaction areas include the upper chest, hands, and face. Treatment usually involves the use of ingestible and topical steroids. The best protection for those affected by the condition is to remain fully covered from sunlight, and use UV-rated clothing and a UV rated umbrella when outdoors.

== See also ==
- List of cutaneous conditions
- Photosensitivity with HIV infection
- Skin lesion
