= Kristian Fredrik Grøn =

Norwegian dermatologist (1855–1931)

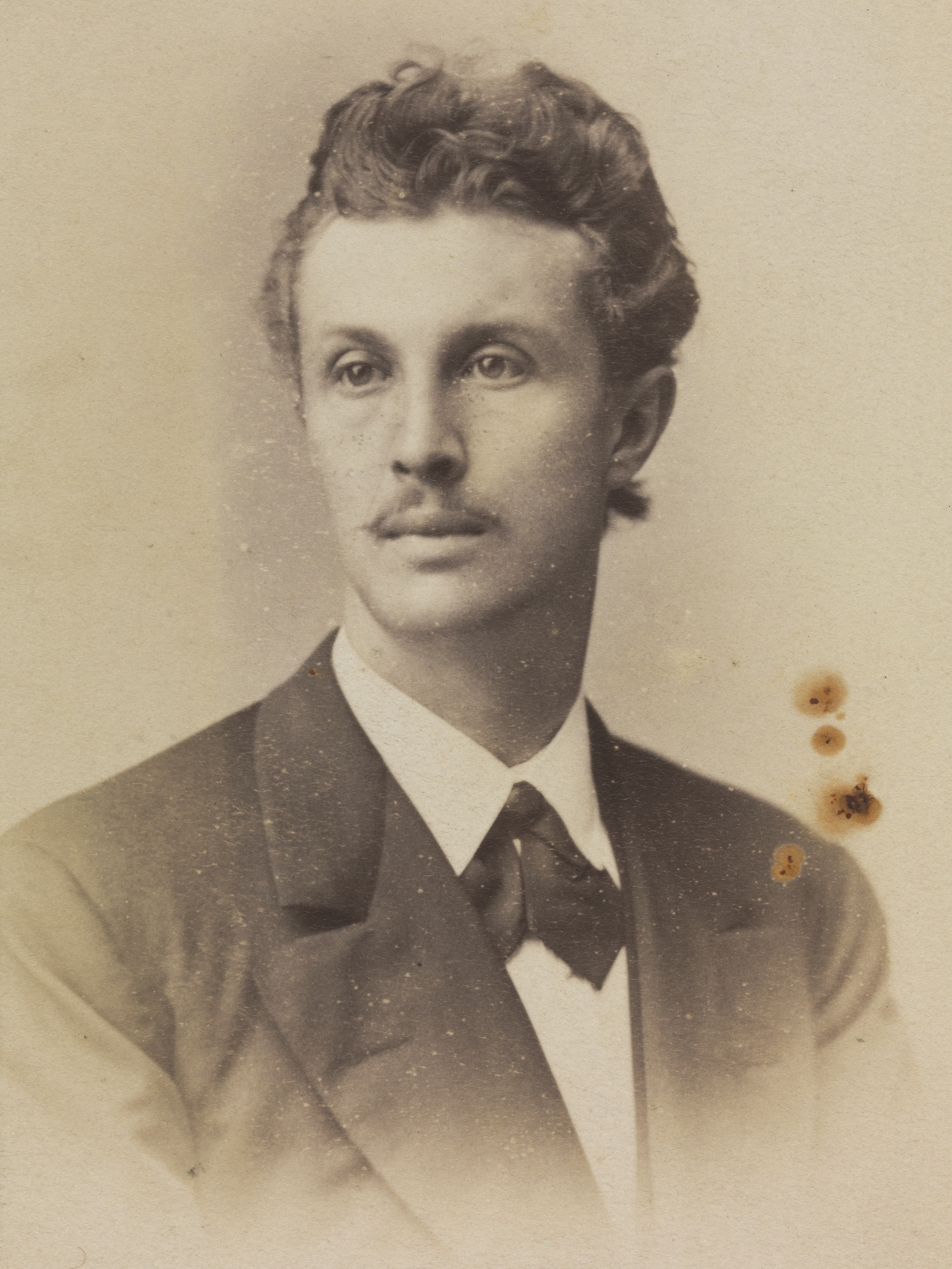

Kristian Fredrik Grøn (23 October 1855 – 1931) was a Norwegian dermatologist.

He was born in Kristiania as a son of physician Andreas Fredrik Schroeter Grøn (1819–1905) and Maren Birgitte Schroeter. His brother Andreas Fredrik Grøn and brother-in-law J. F. O. Semb were also notable physicians.

After finishing his secondary education in 1872 he graduated from university with the cand. med. degree in 1880. In 1874 he met Sigmund Freud while both were working in Kristiania (Today Oslo). He took the dr.med. degree in 1898 with a thesis on tertiary syphilis and settled as chief physician at Ullevål Hospital in 1903. With Carl Rasch from Denmark and Edvard Welander from Sweden he formed the Nordic Dermatology Association in Copenhagen in 1910. He died in 1931.
