= Grön =

Grön is a Swedish/Finnish/Baltic German surname. Notable people with the surname include:

- Eino Grön (born 1939), Finnish American singer
- Johannes Grön, birth name of Ivan Gren (1898–1960), officer of the Imperial Russian and later Soviet Navies
- Otto Gustaf Reinhold von Arnold-Grön or Otto von Arnold (born 1950), Swedish lawyer, economist, and former politician, member of the Riksdag
