= Hydroa vacciniforme =

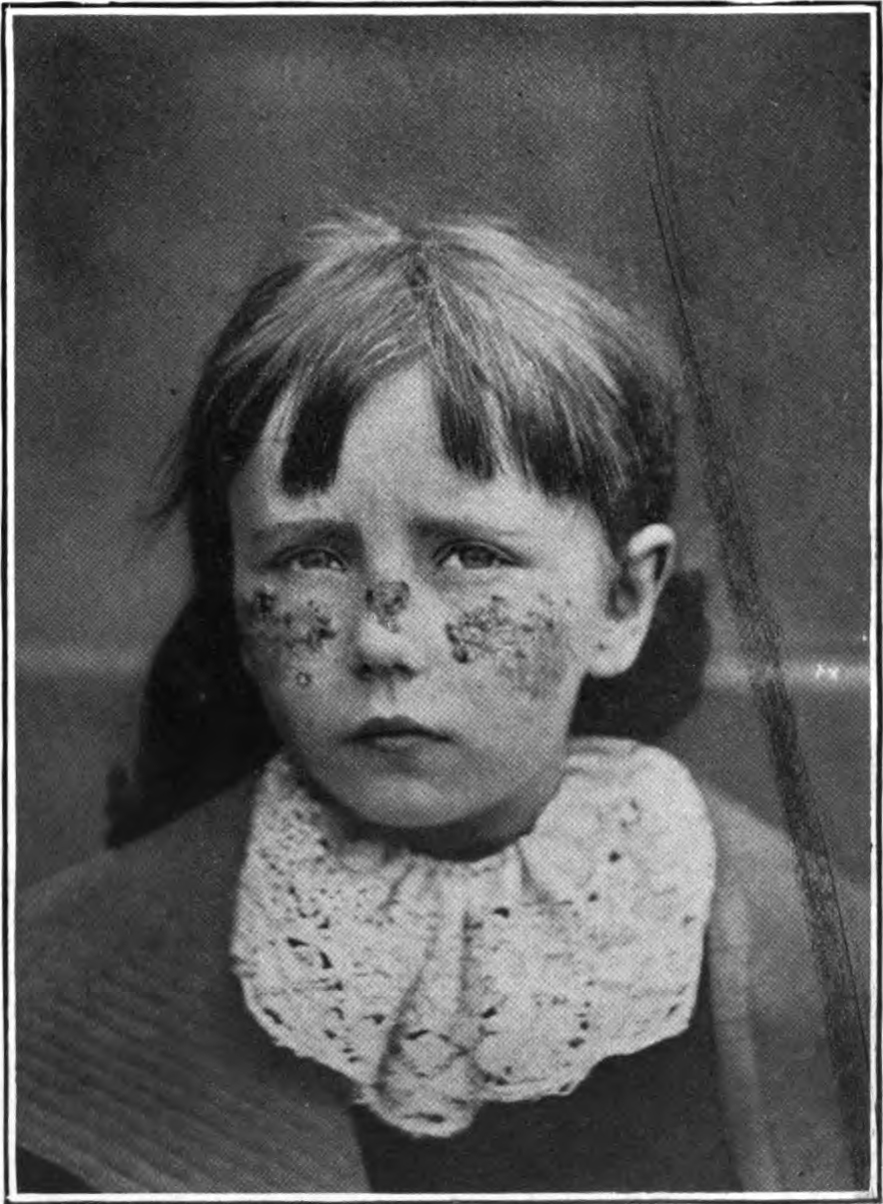
- Hydroa vacciniforme
- Specialty: Dermatology

Hydroa vacciniforme (HV) is a very rare, chronic photodermatitis-type skin condition with usual onset in childhood. It was first described in 1862 by Pierre-Antoine-Ernest Bazin. It is sometimes called "Bazin's hydroa vacciniforme". A study published in Scotland in 2000 reviewed the cases of 17 patients and estimated a prevalence of 0.34 cases per 100,000 population. In this study they reported an average age of onset of 7.9 years. Frequently the rash first appeared in the spring or summer months and involved sun-exposed skin. The rash starts as a vesicular eruption, later becoming umbilicated, and results in vacciniform scarring. It is most frequently found on the nose, cheeks, ears, dorsum of the hand, and arms (places that are most exposed to light).

== Causes ==
Hydroa vacciniforme is commonly associated with reactivation of a latent Epstein–Barr virus (EBV) formerly acquired by an asymptomatic or infectious mononucleosis-causing infection. It is therefore classified as one of the Epstein–Barr virus–associated lymphoproliferative diseases and termed EBV+ HV. These cases of EBV+ HV may progress to another EBV+ lymphoproliferative disease such as T-cell lymphoma, T-cell leukemia, B-cell lymphoma, and B-cell leukemia.

== Natural history ==
In many children hydroa vacciniforme regresses spontaneously by early adulthood. In the 29 patients followed by Iwatuski et al., 11 of the 18 with definite or probable HV were available for follow-up and all were alive without progression of their symptoms. Some had recurrent eruptions of HV. In contrast out of 11 severe patients in this study, 6 had evidence of chronic EBV infection, 5 had hypersensitivity to mosquito bites, 4 had virus-associated hemophagocytic syndrome. 6 of the severe group had natural killer cell lymphocytosis in the peripheral blood.

== Diagnosis ==
Histology of the affected area commonly shows dense perivascular lymphocytic infiltration with reticulated degeneration of the epidermis. A study by Iwatsuki et al. detected Epstein–Barr virus (EBV) positive T-cells in the perivascular infiltration on biopsy in 28/29 patients tested. Antibody titers to EBV were measured in 14 of these patients and only five had abnormal antibody patterns consistent with chronic active EBV infection.

== Treatment ==
Antiviral treatment has been tried with some success in a small number of patients.

== See also ==
- List of cutaneous conditions
- Epstein–Barr virus
