= MAP3K20 =

Protein-coding gene in humans

Identifiers
- Aliases: MAP3K20, AZK, MLK7, MLT, MLTK, MRK, mlklak, pk, ZAK, SFMMP, sterile alpha motif and leucine zipper containing kinase AZK, mitogen-activated protein kinase kinase kinase 20, MLTKalpha, MLTKbeta, CNM6
- External IDs: OMIM: 609479; MGI: 2443258; GeneCards: MAP3K20
Available structures
PDB	Ortholog search: PDBe RCSB
PDB	List of PDB id codes 5HES
Enzyme activity
EC #	BRENDA	ExPASy	KEGG	MetaCyc
2.7.11.25	↗	↗	↗	↗

Gene location (Human)
Chr.	Chromosome 2 (human)
Band	2q31.1	Start	173,075,435 bp
Band	2q31.1	End	173,268,015 bp

Gene location (Mouse)
Chr.	Chromosome 2 (mouse)
Band	2|2 C3	Start	72,115,981 bp
Band	2|2 C3	End	72,272,954 bp
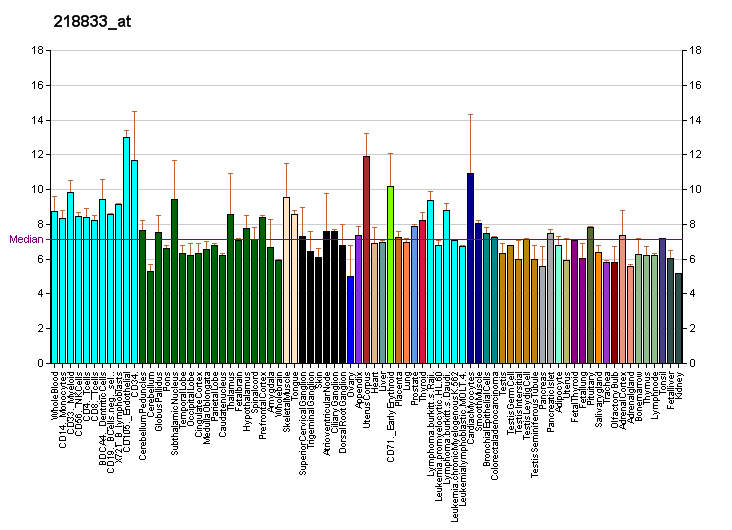
RNA expression pattern
Bgee	Human / Mouse (ortholog); Top expressed in: right ventricle; Skeletal muscle tissue of rectus abdominis; biceps brachii; Skeletal muscle tissue of biceps brachii; body of tongue; saphenous vein; tail of epididymis; vena cava; urethra; seminal vesicula / Top expressed in: interventricular septum; temporal muscle; ankle; triceps brachii muscle; digastric muscle; extraocular muscle; sternocleidomastoid muscle; soleus muscle; atrioventricular valve; intercostal muscle; More reference expression data
BioGPS	More reference expression data
Gene ontology
Molecular function	transferase activity; nucleotide binding; protein kinase activity; metal ion binding; kinase activity; protein serine/threonine kinase activity; protein binding; MAP kinase kinase kinase activity; ATP binding; magnesium ion binding; RNA binding
Cellular component	nucleus; cytoplasm; cytosol
Biological process	cell differentiation; intracellular signal transduction; cell cycle checkpoint signaling; phosphorylation; DNA damage checkpoint signaling; response to stress; cell death; protein phosphorylation; cytoskeleton organization; positive regulation of apoptotic process; cell cycle; response to radiation; cell population proliferation; embryonic digit morphogenesis; limb development; mitotic cell cycle checkpoint signaling; stress-activated MAPK cascade; cellular response to gamma radiation
Sources:Amigo / QuickGO
Orthologs
Databases	NCBI: entry; OMA: entry
Species	Human	Mouse
Entrez	51776	65964
Ensembl	ENSG00000091436	ENSMUSG00000004085
UniProt	Q9NYL2	Q9ESL4
RefSeq (mRNA)	NM_016653; NM_133646	NM_001164791; NM_023057; NM_178084
RefSeq (protein)	NP_057737; NP_598407	NP_001158263; NP_075544; NP_835185
Location (UCSC)	Chr 2: 173.08 – 173.27 Mb	Chr 2: 72.12 – 72.27 Mb
PubMed search
- Wikidata
View/Edit Human	View/Edit Mouse

Mitogen-activated protein kinase kinase kinase 20 is an enzyme that in humans is encoded by the MAP3K20 gene (sometimes called ZAK).

This gene is a member of the MAPKKK family of signal transduction molecules and encodes a protein with an N-terminal kinase catalytic domain, followed by a leucine zipper motif and a sterile-alpha motif (SAM). This magnesium-binding protein forms homodimers and is located in the cytoplasm. The protein mediates gamma radiation signaling leading to cell cycle arrest and activity of this protein plays a role in cell cycle checkpoint regulation in cells. The protein also has pro-apoptotic activity. Alternate transcriptional splice variants, encoding different isoforms, have been characterized.

== Interactions ==
ZAK has been shown to interact with ZNF33A.
