= Carl Rasch (physician) =

Danish physician

Professor Carl Rasch M.D
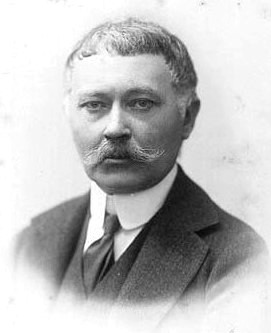
- Carl Rasch
- Born: Carl Emanuel Flemming Rasch; 7 February 1861; Copenhagen, Denmark
- Died: 6 July 1938 (aged 77)
- Known for: First description of polymorphous light eruption; Co-founding the Nordic Dermatology Association
- Medical career
- Sub-specialties: Dermatology

Carl Emanuel Flemming Rasch (7 February 1861 – 6 July 1938) was a Danish dermatologist and venereologist who in 1900 coined the term "polymorphic light eruption", following his studies of the effect of sunlight on the skin.

He was one of the specialists involved in the care of the author Karen Blixen, whose medical history has been the subject of debate by physicians and biographers.

Rasch was the co-founder of the Nordic Dermatology Association (NDA) and wrote the first Danish dermatology textbook.

== Early life ==
Carl Rasch was born in Copenhagen on 7 February 1861. He was a student of Ernest Besnier who first described prurigo gestationis, later known as prurigo gestationis of Besnier. In honour of his teacher, Rasch later gave the name Besnier’s prurigo to a skin condition eventually known as atopic dermatitis.

== Dermatology ==
Thomas Bateman had described, based on findings by Robert Willan, what he called "eczema solare", in the early 19th century, a condition caused by the action of sunlight on abnormally reacting skin. Rasch's interest in "the action of sunlight on the skin" led him, in 1900, to describe this same condition as "eczema-like polymorphic light eruption". He has since been credited with coining the term "polymorphic light eruption", synonymous with "polymorphous light eruption".

In 1904, during the International Dermatology Congress in Berlin, Rasch, with Kristian Grön from Norway and Edvard Welander from Sweden, created an association to promote Nordic dermatology and venereology via scientific journals, education and specific Nordic congresses. They established the Nordic Dermatology Association (NDA) and held the first Nordic Dermatology Congress in May 1910 in Copenhagen.

Regarded by the Danish as "Denmark's finest morphologist", in 1906 he was appointed chair of dermatology at Copenhagen University. He was succeeded by Holger Haxthausen in 1931. In 1918, Haxthausen too, mentioned polymorphic light eruption. Svend Lomholt described Rasch as Danish dermatology's scientific founder.

Rasch visited England several times and was familiar to English dermatologists. In 1926, he spoke at the Royal Society of Medicine, London, on the effect of light on skin. He also wrote the first Danish dermatology textbook. He held honorary memberships at numerous dermatological associations around the world. He became a Knight of the Order of the Dannebrog in 1922, and a Commander of the same in 1932.

== Karen Blixen ==
In 1915, Rasch began a decade of consultations with author Karen Blixen. He performed a Wassermann test, confirming Syphilis and she subsequently commenced treatments including arsenic, mercury and salvarsan. She requested that he keep her diagnosis secret.

In 1919 and again in 1925, Rasch re-examined her and informed her that she no longer had syphilis. Over the years, he performed several Wasserman tests. Her medical history and communication with physicians have been a matter of debate by her biographers and she did not disclose her secret use of laxatives, amphetamines and fear of gaining weight. Rather than believing Rasch, she followed the syphilis treatments advised by numerous specialists, which delayed the treatment of her true condition, stomach ulcer.

== Death and legacy ==
Rasch died on 6 July 1938. He had a large collection of copperplate prints, the proceeds of the sale of which he bequeathed to the Dermatology Society, to be used particularly for the travel expenses of young Danish dermatologists.

== Selected publications ==
- — (1927). Hudens Sygdomme og Deres Behandling (in Danish) (3. ed.). Gyldendalske Boghandel. (First edition 1905)
