= Methylcoumarin =

Group of isomeric chemical compounds

Methylcoumarin is one of a series of isomers in which a methyl group substitutes for a hydrogen atom in coumarin. They all have formula C_{10}H_{8}O_{2} and molecular weight 160.172 g/mol.

Name	Derivatives	Melting pt (°C)	Boiling pt (°C)	CAS number	PubChem	EINECS	SMILES	Chemical structure
3-Methylcoumarin				2445-82-1	CID 17130 from PubChem	219-498-8	CC1=CC2=CC=CC=C2OC1=O	
4-Methylcoumarin	7-Amino-4-methylcoumarin; Hymecromone			607-71-6	CID 11833 from PubChem	210-141-1	CC1=CC(=O)OC2=CC=CC=C12	
5-Methylcoumarin	Siderin			42286-84-0	CID 39172 from PubChem		CC1=C2C=CC(=O)OC2=CC=C1	
6-Methylcoumarin		72-75	303	92-48-8	CID 7092 from PubChem	202-158-8	CC1=CC2=C(C=C1)OC(=O)C=C2	
7-Methylcoumarin		128-130		2445-83-2	CID 17131 from PubChem	219-499-3	CC1=CC2=C(C=C1)C=CC(=O)O2	
8-Methylcoumarin		106–107		1807-36-9	CID 15734 from PubChem		CC1=C2C(=CC=C1)C=CC(=O)O2	
