= Solar urticaria =

- Formation of wheals on the arm
- Specialty: Dermatology

Solar urticaria (SU) is a rare condition in which exposure to ultraviolet or UV radiation, or sometimes even visible light, induces a case of urticaria or hives that can appear in both covered and uncovered areas of the skin. It is classified as a type of physical urticaria. The classification of disease types is somewhat controversial. One classification system distinguished various types of SU based on the wavelength of the radiation that causes the breakout; another classification system is based on the type of allergen that initiates a breakout.

The agent in the human body responsible for the reaction to radiation, known as the photoallergen, has not yet been identified. The disease itself can be difficult to diagnose properly because it is so similar to other dermatological disorders, such as polymorphous light eruption or PLE. The most helpful test is a diagnostic phototest, a specialized test which confirms the presence of an abnormal sunburn reaction. Once recognized, treatment of the disease commonly involves the administration of antihistamines, and desensitization treatments such as phototherapy. In more extreme cases, the use of immunosuppressive drugs and even plasmapheresis may be considered.

The initial discovery of the disease is credited to P. Merklen in 1904, but it did not have a name until the suggestion of "solar urticaria" was given by William Waddell Duke in 1923. However, their research contributed to the study of this uncommon disease. More than one hundred cases have been reported in the past century.

== Signs and symptoms ==
Generally, the areas affected are exposed skin not usually protected by clothing; however it can also occur in areas covered by clothing. Areas constantly subjected to the sun's rays may only be slightly affected if at all. People with extreme cases will also have reactions to artificial light sources that emit a UV wavelength. Parts of the body only thinly covered can also potentially be subjected to an outbreak.

Life with SU can be difficult. Patients are subject to constant itching and pain, as within minutes of the initial exposure to UV radiation a rash will appear. The urticarial reaction begins in the form of pruritus, later progressing to erythema and edema in the exposed areas of the skin. If vast areas of the body are affected, the loss of fluid into the skin could lead to light-headedness, headache, nausea, and vomiting. Extremely rarely, patients have been reported to experience an increase in heart rate that can cause a stroke or heart attack due to the body cavity swelling. Other rare side effects can be bronchospasm and glucose instability issues. Also, if a large area of the body is suddenly exposed the person may be subject to an anaphylactic reaction. Once free of exposure, the rash will usually fade away within several hours; rare and extreme cases can take a day or two to normalize depending on severity of the reaction.

== Causes ==
Solar urticaria is an immunoglobulin E-mediated hypersensitivity that can be introduced through primary or secondary factors, or induced by exogenous photosensitization. Primary SU is believed to be a type I hypersensitivity (a mild to severe reaction to an antigen including anaphylaxis) in which an antigen, or substance provoking an immune response, is "induced by UV or visible radiation." Secondary SU can occur when a person comes into contact with chemicals such as tar, pitch, and dyes. People who use drugs such as benoxaprofen or patients with erythropoietic protoporphyria may also contract this secondary form. These items that cause this photosensitivity are exogenous photosensitizers because they are outside of the body and cause it to have a greater sensitivity to light.

Also, there have been a few unorthodox (unusual) causes of solar urticaria. For those susceptible to visible light, white T-shirts may increase the chances of experiencing an outbreak. In one case, doctors found that the white T-shirt absorbed UVA radiation from the sun and transformed it into visible light which caused the reaction. Another patient was being treated with the antibiotic tetracycline for a separate dermatological disorder and broke out in hives when exposed to the sun, the first case to implicate tetracycline as a solar urticaria inducing agent.

It is not yet known what specific agent in the body brings about the allergic reaction to the radiation. When patients with SU were injected with an irradiated autologous serum, many developed urticaria within the area of injection. When people who did not have SU were injected, they did not demonstrate similar symptoms. This indicates that the reaction is only a characteristic of the patients with solar urticaria and that it is not phototoxic. It is possible that this photoallergen is located on the binding sites of IgE that are found on the surface of mast cells. The photoallergen is believed to begin its configuration through the absorption of radiation by a chromophore. The molecule, because of the radiation, is transformed resulting in the formation of a new photoallergen.

== Diagnosis ==
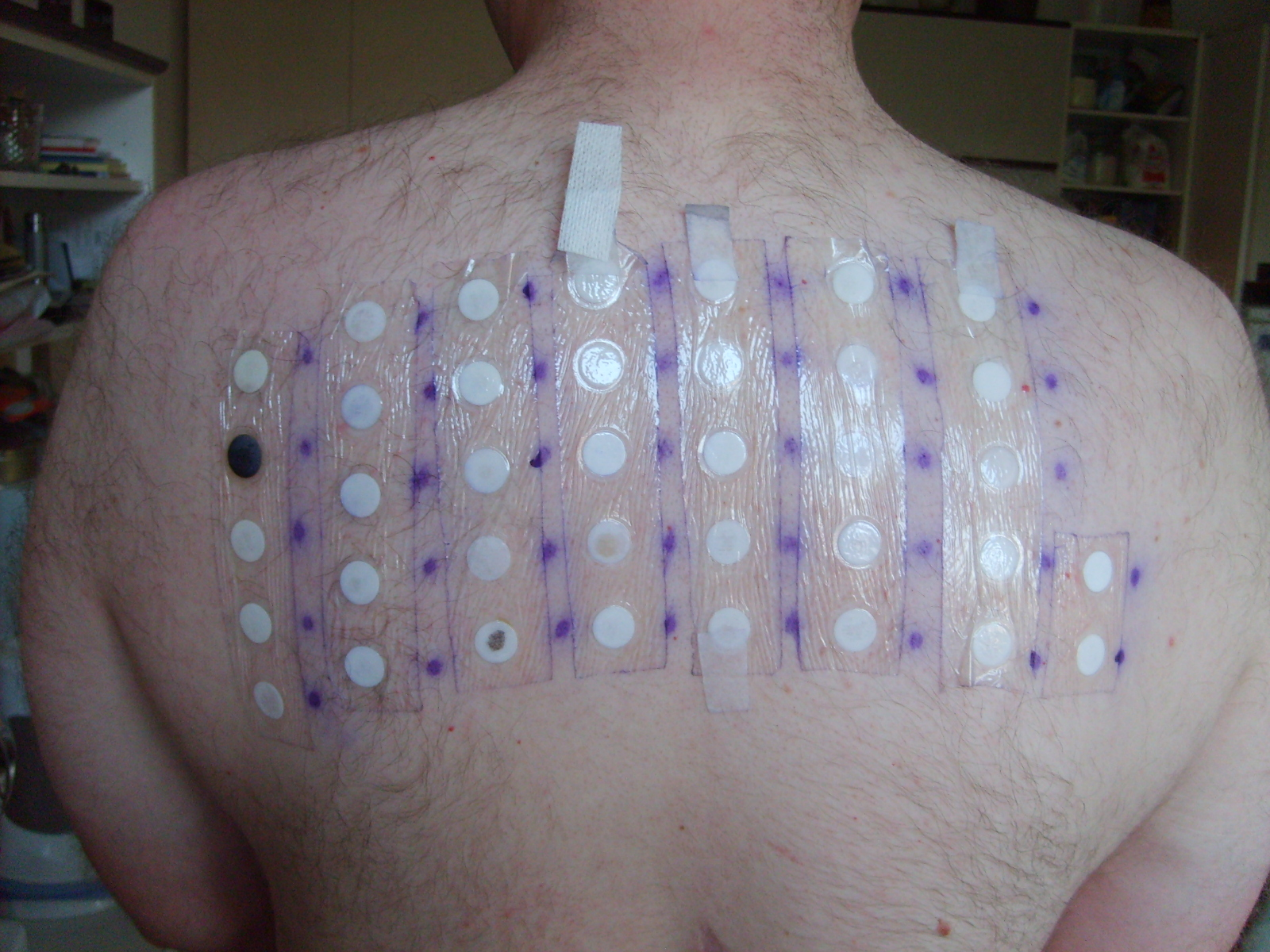
Patch test

Solar urticaria can be difficult to diagnose, but its presence can be confirmed by the process of phototesting. There are several forms of these tests including photopatch tests, phototests, photoprovocation tests, and laboratory tests. All of these are necessary to determine the exact condition of the patient. Photopatch tests are patch tests conducted when it is believed that a patient is experiencing certain symptoms due to an allergy that will only occur when in contact with sunlight. After the procedure, the patient is given a low dosage of UVA radiation.

Another test known as a phototest is the most useful in identifying solar urticaria. In this test, one centimeter segments of skin are subject to varying amounts of UVA and UVB radiation in order to determine the specific dosage of the certain form of radiation that causes the urticaria to form. When testing for its less intense form (fixed solar urticaria), phototesting should be conducted only in the areas where the hives have appeared to avoid the possibility of getting false-negative results.

A third form of testing is the photoprovocation test which is used to identify disorders instigated by sun burns. The process of this test involves exposing one area of a patient's arm to certain dosage of UVB radiation and one area on the other arm to a certain dosage of UVA radiation. The amount of radiation that the patient is exposed to is equal to that "received in an hour of midday summer sun." If the procedure produces a rash, then the patient will undergo a biopsy. Finally, there are laboratory tests which generally involve procedures such as blood, urine, and fecal biochemical tests. In some situations, a skin biopsy may be performed.

=== Classification ===
Solar urticaria, due to its particular features, is considered to be a type of physical urticaria or light sensitivity. Physical urticaria arises from physical factors in the environment, which in the case of solar urticaria is UV radiation or light. SU may be classified based on the wavelength of the radiative energy that causes the allergic reaction; known as Harber's classification, six types have been identified in this system. Type I solar urticaria is caused by UVB (ultraviolet B) radiation, with wavelengths ranging from 290 to 320 nm. Type II is induced by UVA (ultraviolet A) radiation with wavelengths that can range from 320 to 400 nm. The wavelength range of type III and IV spans from 400 to 500 nm, while type V can be caused by UVB radiation to visible light (280–600 nm). Type VI has only been known to occur at 400 nm.

Another classification distinguishes two types. The first is a hypersensitivity caused by a reaction to photoallergens located only in people with SU; while the second is caused by photoallergens that can be found in both people with SU and people without it.

A subgroup of solar urticaria, fixed solar urticaria, has also been identified. It is a rare, less intense form of the disease with wheals (swollen areas of the skin) that affect certain, fixed areas of the body. Fixed solar urticaria is induced by a broad spectrum of radiative energy with wavelengths ranging from 300 to 700 nm.

=== Differential diagnosis ===
Polymorphous light eruption (PMLE) is the easiest disease to mistake for solar urticaria because the locations of the lesions are similar (the V of the neck and the arms). However, patients with SU are more likely to develop lesions on the face. Also, a reaction with PMLE will take a greater amount of time to appear than with solar urticaria. Lupus erythematosus has been mistaken for SU; however, lesions from lupus erythematosus will take a longer amount of time to go away. Furthermore, when being tested for the two diseases, patients with SU have a reaction immediately while patients with lupus erythematosus will have a delayed reaction. Patients who have experienced solar urticarial symptoms from a young age could mistakenly be thought to have erythropoietic protoporphyria. However, the main symptom for this disease is pain and patients with have been found to have abnormal levels of protoporphyrin in their blood while these levels are normal in SU patients. Finally, cholinergic urticaria, or urticaria induced by heat, can occasionally appear to be solar urticaria because the heat from the sun will cause a person with the disease to have a reaction.

== Management ==
=== Antihistamines ===
Histamines are proteins associated with many allergic reactions. When the UV radiation or light comes in contact with a person with solar urticaria, histamine is released from mast cells. When this occurs, the permeability of vessels near the area of histamine release is increased. This allows blood fluid to enter the vessels and cause inflammation. Antihistamines suppress the activity of the histamine.

Diphenhydramine, a first-generation H1 receptor antagonist or medicine that combats the H1 receptor that is associated with many allergic reactions, has been found to be the most potent antihistamine for this particular disease. Patients prescribed 50 milligrams four times per day have been able to sustain normal exposure to the sun without developing a reaction.

Patients with less potent forms of solar urticaria such as fixed solar urticaria can be treated with the medication fexofenadine, which may also be used prophylactically to prevent recurrence.

=== Desensitization ===
This form of treatment is meant to reduce the intensity or altogether eliminate the allergic reactions people have by gradually increasing exposure to the form of radiation that brings about the reaction. In the case of solar urticaria, phototherapy and photochemotherapy are the two major desensitization treatments.

Phototherapy can be used for prevention. Exposure to a certain form of light or UV radiation enables the patient to build up a tolerance and outbreaks can be reduced. This type of treatment is generally conducted in the spring. However, the benefits of this therapy only last for two to three days.

Photochemotherapy, or PUVA, is considered superior to phototherapy because it produces a longer-lasting tolerance of the radiation that initiates the outbreak. When treatment first begins, the main goal is to build up the patient's tolerance to UVA radiation enough so that they can be outdoors without having an episode of solar urticaria. Therefore, treatments are regulated at three per week while constantly increasing the exposure to UVA radiation. Once the patient has reached an adequate level of desensitization, treatments are reduced to once or twice per week.

=== Immunoglobulin E (IgE) Therapy ===
Some patients and researchers have successfully treated solar urticaria with Omalizumab (trade name Xolair) which is commonly used to treat Idiopathic Urticaria. Omalizumab is a recombinant humanized monoclonal antibody against IgE. It acts by binding free IgE at the same site that IgE would bind to its high-affinity receptor (FcεRI) on mast cells, thereby reducing free IgE in the serum

=== Immunosuppression ===
Doctors will sometimes prescribe immunosuppressive drugs such as prednisolone and ciclosporin if the patient has an intense form of solar urticaria. However, the side effects of these medicines can be severe which is why they are reserved for the most extreme of cases.

=== Plasmapheresis ===
In more extreme cases, plasmapheresis can be considered. This technique is used to remove the blood plasma or fluid in the red blood cells and then return the cells to the body. It "removes a circulating factor from the blood that may be involved in causing the urticaria," but is still being tested and is not always effective. When the treatment is a success, the patient's photosensitivity is decreased to the degree that they can undergo PUVA which can result in the relief of the urticarial outbreaks for an extended period of time. The major setback to this treatment is that the side effects can be severe and may include anaphylactoid reactions.

== Epidemiology ==
In the United States, only about 4% of patients with photosensitive disorders are reported to have been diagnosed with solar urticaria. Internationally, the number is slightly larger at 5.3%. Solar urticaria may occur in all races but studies monitoring 135 African Americans and 110 Caucasians with photodermatoses found that 2.2% of the African Americans had SU and 8% of the Caucasians had the disease showing that Caucasians have a better chance of getting the disease. The age ranges anywhere from 5–70 years old, but the average age is 35 and cases have been reported with children that are still in infancy. Solar urticaria accounts for less than one percent of the many documented urticaria cases. To put that into a better perspective, since its first documented case in Japan in 1916, over one hundred other instances of the disease have been reported.

== History ==
Solar urticaria was first identified by P. Merklen in 1904. Just a year later, in 1905, Ward became the first to induce urticaria through exposure to the sun in a controlled environment. The first documented case came in Japan in 1916. The name "solar urticaria" was proposed in 1923. In 1928, urticaria was induced for the first time. This was carried out by phototesting with increasing amounts of radiation of varying wavelengths. In 1942, the disease was passively transferred to normal volunteers using serum from patients with solar urticaria.
