= Annales des Maladies de la Peau et de la Syphilis =

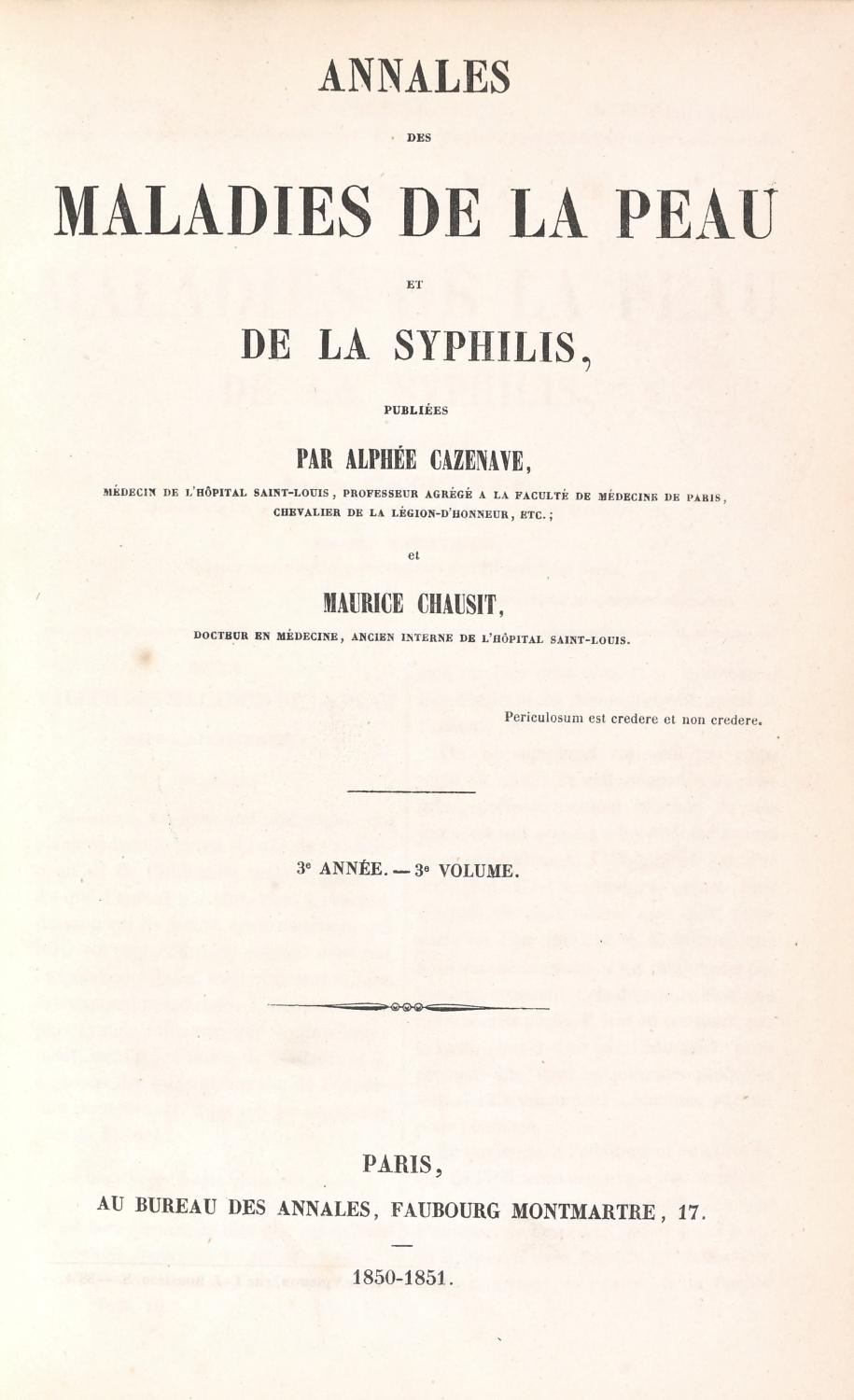
- Discipline: Infectious diseases
- Language: French

Publication details
- History: 1843–1852

Standard abbreviations
- ISO 4: Ann. Mal. Peau Syph.

Indexing
- OCLC no.: 02257530

Annales des Maladies de la Peau et de la Syphilis ('Annals of Skin Diseases and Syphilis') was a French medical journal established in 1843 by Pierre Cazenave. In 1844 it published the first account of pemphigus foliaceus, written by Cazenave. Most issues were his works and its contents reflect a summary of his career in general.

The journal's final years saw papers describing several experiments on syphilis, including one where Cazenave claimed to have inoculated himself with the disease. Contributions also came from William Wallace, Philippe Ricord, and Vidal de Cassis.

The journal ceased publication in 1852.

== Foundation ==
Annales des Maladies de la Peau et de la Syphilis was established in 1843 by the French dermatologist Pierre Louis Alphée Cazenave, who had trained under Jean-Louis Marie Alibert at the Hôpital Saint-Louis. It focussed on skin diseases and syphilis.

The second dermatological journal, it was released five years after Syphilidologie; both combined the specialties of dermatology and venereology. At the time, Cazenave was professor of medicine at the Hôpital Saint-Louis, where he used his observations to publish in the journal.

== Contents ==
Cazenave wrote most of the text himself and its contents reflect a summary of his career in general. Sometimes he used a different name as authorship. He published the first account of pemphigus foliaceus in the journal in 1844. In it he also wrote on lupus erythematosus.

The early 1850s saw the appearance of several reports on "syphilization". In his article titled "Observations. Syphilide tuberculeuse. Ecthyma syphilitique. Périostoses. Inoculation avec succès du symptôme secondaire," (1850-1851) Cazenave claimed to have inoculated himself with syphilis. It received little attention unlike the experiments of Johann von Waller in "Du caractère contagieux de la syphilis secondaire," (1850-1851), which gave the account of infecting several children using pus from presumed cases of secondary syphilis.

In a later issue, the 1830s experiments by Dublin's William Wallace and Lourcine's Henri Bouley appeared in an article titled "De la contagion, par voie d'inoculation artificielle, des accidents consécutifs de la syphilis". A detailed account of how Bouley re-infected a woman with syphilis appeared in the November 1851 issue. (Note: Hôpital Lourcine was specifically for prostitutes with syphylis. Children at the Hôpital des Enfants Malades were typically affected by tuberculosis. The journal also features details of works by Philippe Ricord and Vidal de Cassis of the Hôpital du Midi, formerly the Hôpital des Vénériens.)

The journal ceased publication in 1852.
