= Pierre Louis Alphée Cazenave =

French dermatologist (1795–1877)

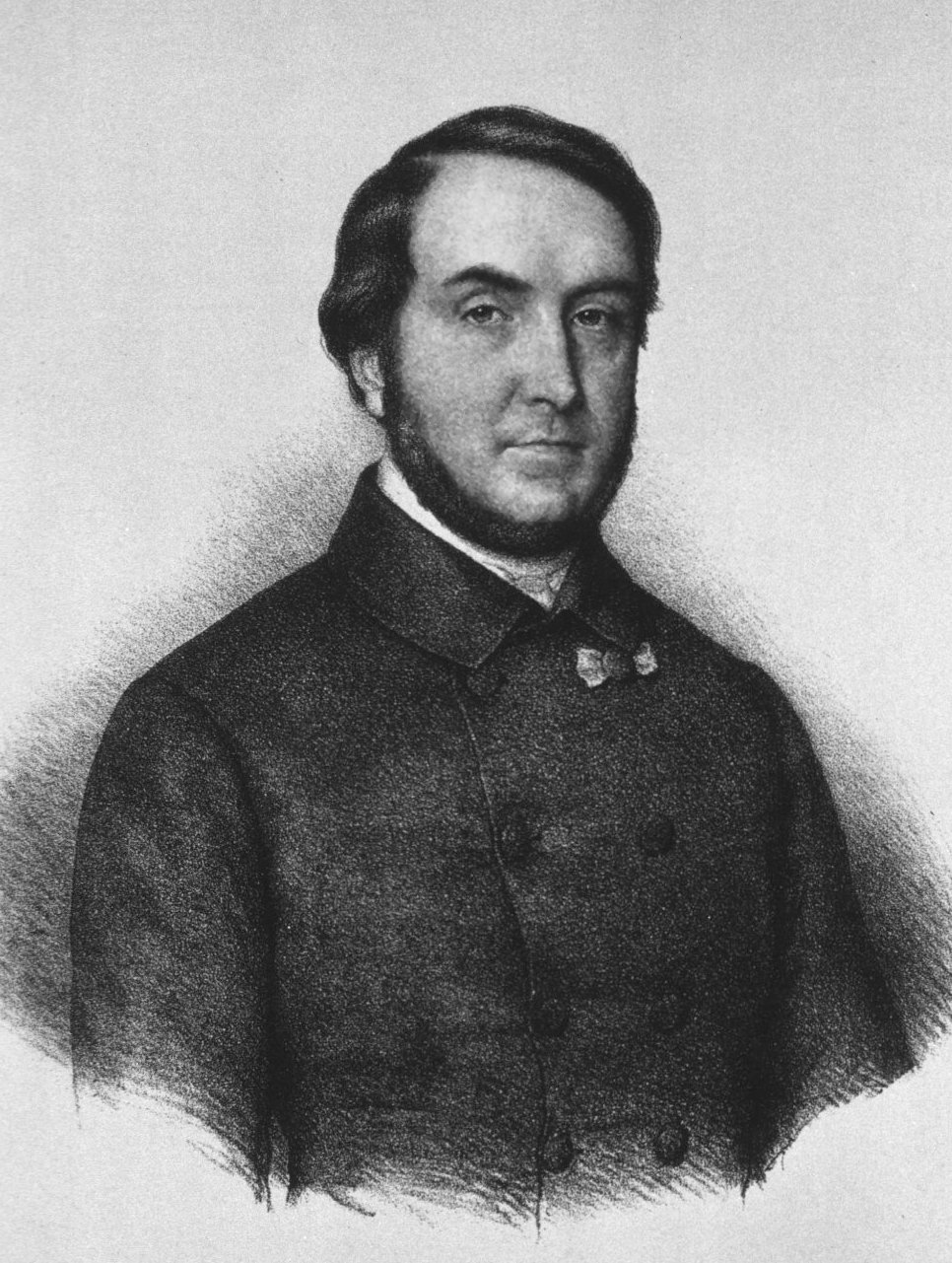
Pierre Cazenave

Pierre Louis Alphée Cazenave (French pronunciation: [pjɛʁ kaznav]; 5 May 1795 – 9 April 1877) was a French dermatologist who practiced medicine at the Hôpital Saint-Louis in Paris.

In 1823 he was appointed interne to the hospitals of Paris, and in 1835 became professor agrégé to the medical faculty. At Hôpital Saint-Louis, Cazenave was a student of Laurent-Théodore Biett, a physician credited for introducing into French medicine an anatomical approach for analysis of skin disorders. This analytical method was first developed by two English physicians; Robert Willan and Thomas Bateman.

In 1828, with Henri Édouard Schedel, he published a book based on Biett's lectures and observations, titled Abregé pratique des maladies de la peau. The compilation was to become a highly influential dermatological work, being translated into a number of different languages.

From 1843 until 1852, Cazenave was editor of Annales des Maladies de la Peau et de la Syphilis, a journal dedicated to scientific dermatology.

Cazenave is credited with coining the term lupus érythémateux (lupus erythematosus). In 1844 he first described a rare dermatological condition known as pemphigus foliaceus.

== Selected writings ==
- Abrégé pratique des maladies de la peau d'après les auteurs les plus estimés, et surtout d'après les documents uisés dans les Leçons cliniques de M. Biett, with Henry Edward Schedel (1828, 1833, 1838, 1847). Full texts at Google Books
- Traité des syphilides ou maladies vénériennes de la peau, précédé de considérations sur la syphilis etc (1843); German translation- 1844.
- Lecons sur les maladies de la peau profesés à l’École de médecine de Paris en 1841-44 (1845).
- Leçons sur les maladies de la peau (1856).
