= List of monuments and memorials to veterinarians =

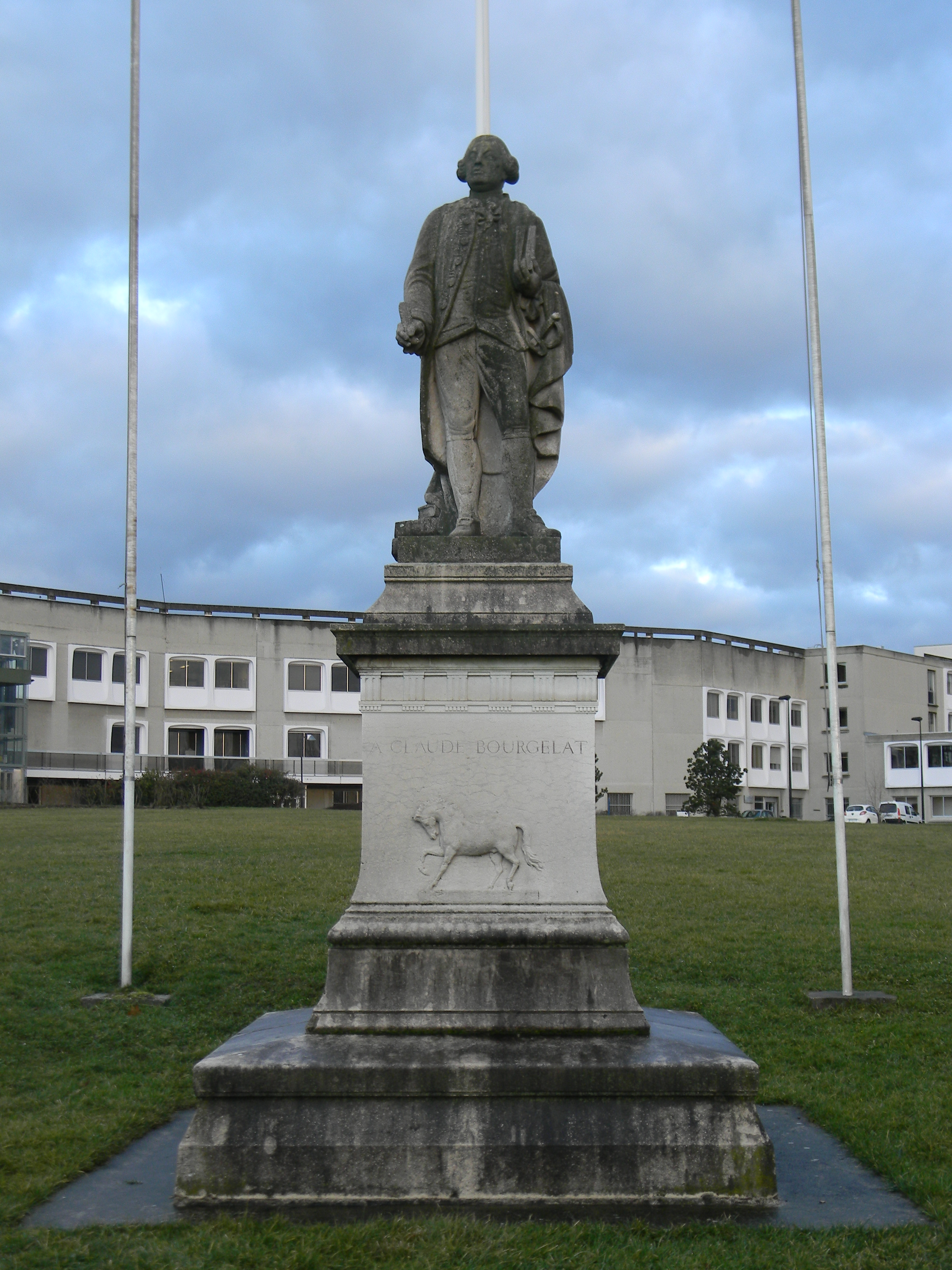
Monument to Bourgelat, the first monument to a veterinarian

== Monuments ==
- Monument to veterinarians, Lviv National Stepan Gzhytsky University of Veterinary Medicine and Biotechnology, Ukraine
- Monument to veterinarians, Nakhichevan-on-Don neighborhood of Rostov-on-Don, Russia, 2014
- Monument to veterinarians, Saratov Veterinary Institute, Saratov, Russia
- Monument to a veterinarian, Vitebsk, Belarus, 2011
- United States Army Veterinary Corps centennial statue at the U.S. Army Medical Department Museum at Fort Sam Houston in San Antonio, 2016
- Military Working Dog Teams National Monument; The monument represents handlers, dogs, and veterinary support, from all military service branches (Army, Marines, Navy, Air Force, and Coast Guard) that have made up the Military Working Dog program since World War II.
- Among Wrocław Gnomes there is a figurine of gnome Roszek treating a dog, by the Veterinary Department of the Wrocław University of Environmental and Life Sciences

=== Monuments to individual veterinarians ===
- Monument to Claude Bourgelat, Lyon, France, 1876
- Monument to Henri Bouley; Media related to Statue d'Henri Bouley (Maisons-Alfort) at Wikimedia Commons
- Monument to Zemach Shabad, Vilnius, Lithuania, reflecting the fact that he was the prototype of "Doctor Aybolit", an animal doctor from a children's poem by Korney Chukovsky.
- Monuments to (fictional) Doctor Aybolit are installed in many Russian towns.

== Memorials ==
- Australian Army Veterinary Corps memorial
- Royal Army Veterinary Corps memorial
