= Monument to veterinarians =

- Памятник ветеринарным врачам (Russian)
- Location: Rostov-on-Don, Rostov Oblast, Russia

History
- Founded: September 24, 2014

Monument to veterinarians (Russian: Памятник ветеринарным врачам) is a monument in the Nakhichevan-on-Don neighborhood of Rostov-on-Don, Russian Federation. The monument was designed by the sculptor Dmitry Lyndin, also known for other works: "Korobeinik ", "Assol", "Egyptian Pyramid", and "Monument to the first-grader".

== History ==
The monument was opened on September 24, 2014, in honor of the 225th anniversary of the veterinary service of the city, on the eve of an International Veterinary Congress. The date for the anniversary was established basing on a document dated by 1879, found in Rostov archives about the award to Don Cossack veterinarian Paramonov who risked his life while treating horses of anthrax.

== Description ==
The monument depicts a smiling bearded man, dressed in an apron, sitting on a simple bench. The doctor gently pets a foal that stands in front of him. The doctor himself is sculptor's impression of Paramonov. The foal was chosen as an animal not by chance – it is a symbol of the Don and new life. On the shoulder of the vet located a bag of tools at the disposal of any farrier of the time. It also has a small hole for donations. The money collected in this way will go to charitable organizations.

The monument is located away from the city center, on the Line 16 Street, next to the house 18. In the same house lived a honored veterinarian of the RSFSR Sergey Bakhtarov. For a long time, he headed the station for treatment of animals, gave official approval and helped in the introduction of various vaccines in the region.

== See also ==
- List of monuments to veterinarians
