= Veterinarian =

Health professional who treats non-human animals

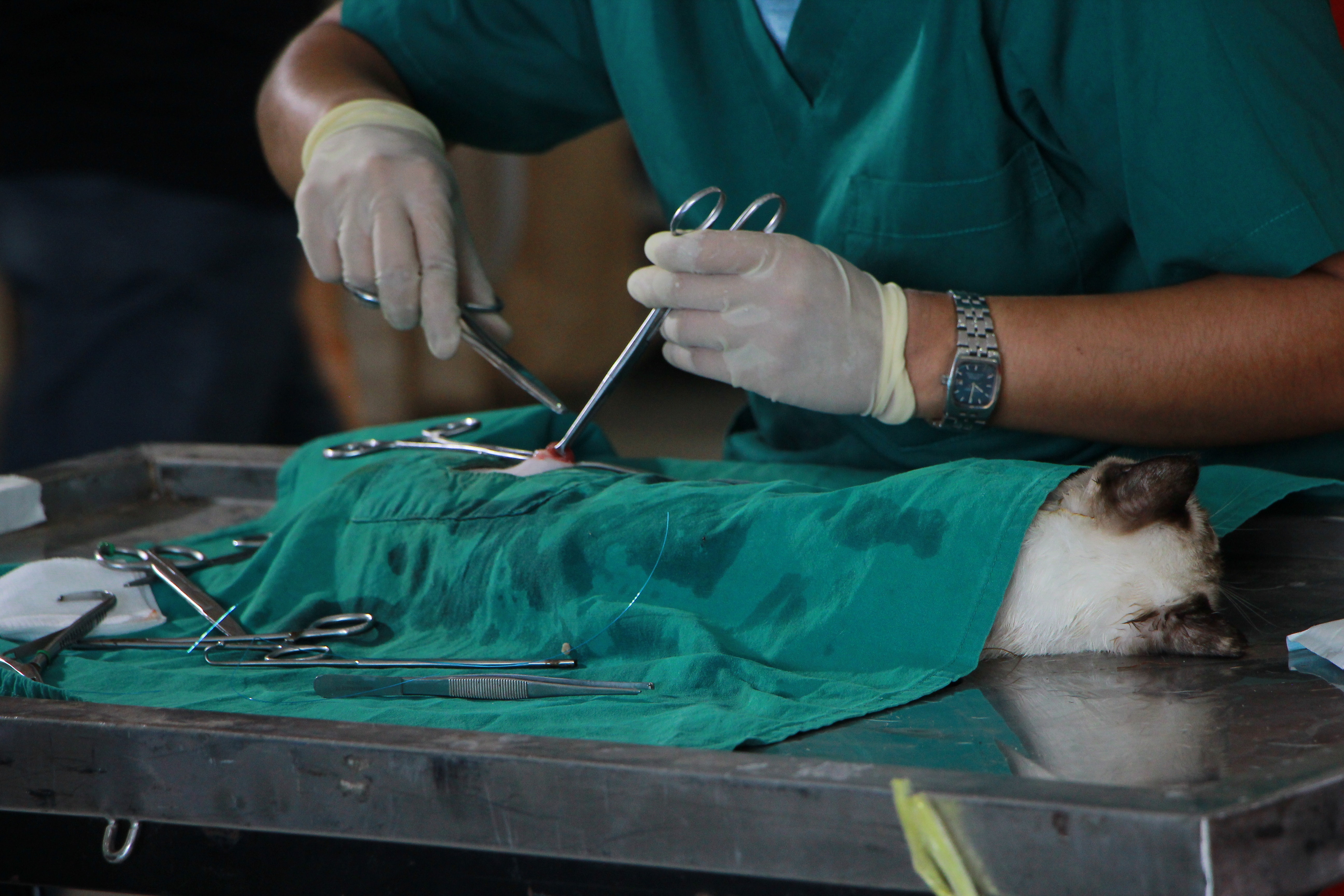
A veterinarian conducts a surgery on a domestic cat.

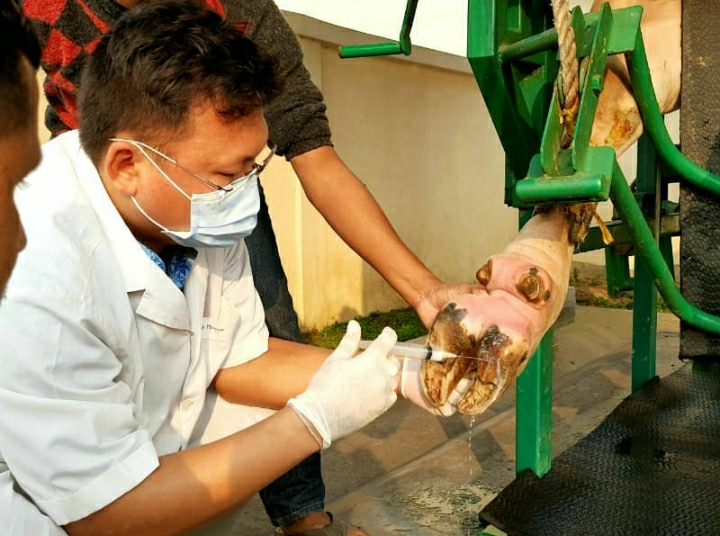
Bovine hoof health management by a veterinarian

A veterinarian (vet) or veterinary surgeon is a medical professional who practices veterinary medicine. They manage a wide range of health conditions and injuries in non-human animals. Along with this, veterinarians also play a role in animal reproduction, health management, conservation, husbandry and breeding and preventive medicine like nutrition, vaccination and parasitic control as well as biosecurity and zoonotic disease surveillance and prevention.

== Description ==
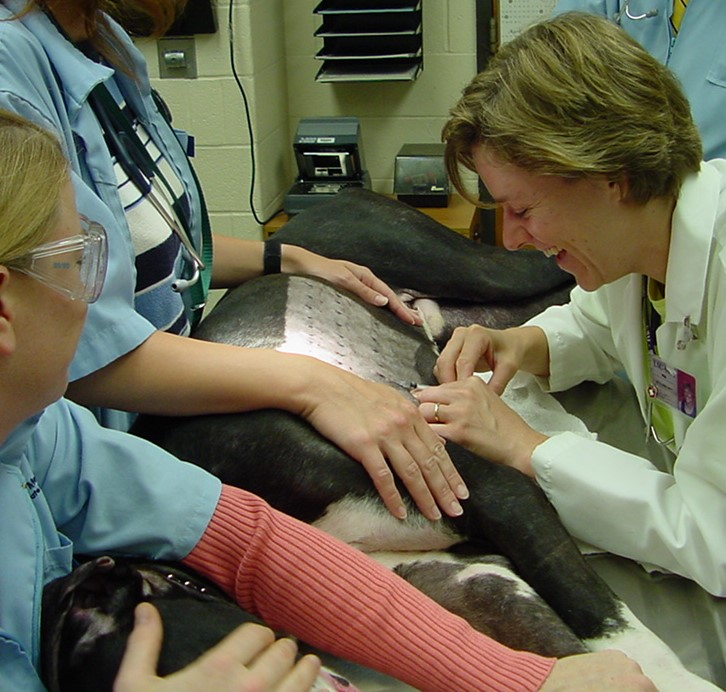
Veterinarian performing an intradermal test for allergy in a dog (2006)

In many countries, the local nomenclature for a veterinarian is a regulated and protected term, meaning that members of the public without the prerequisite qualifications and/or license are not able to use the title. This title is selective in order to produce the most knowledgeable veterinarians that pass these qualifications. In many cases, the activities that may be undertaken by a veterinarian (such as treatment of illness or surgery in animals) are restricted only to those professionals who are registered as a veterinarian. For instance, in the United Kingdom, as in other jurisdictions, animal treatment may only be performed by registered veterinarians (with a few designated exceptions, such as paraveterinary workers), and it is illegal for any person who is not registered to call themselves a veterinarian, prescribe any drugs, or perform treatment.

Most veterinarians work in a clinical setting or bricks and mortar practice, treating animals directly. Other vets work as mobile vets offering veterinary services and treating patients in their clients' home. Veterinarians may be involved in general practice, treating animals of all types; they may be specialized in a specific group of animals such as companion animals, livestock, zoo animals or equines; or may specialize in a narrow medical discipline such as surgery, dermatology or internal medicine. As with other healthcare professionals, veterinarians face ethical decisions about the care of their patients. Current debates within the profession include the ethics of certain procedures believed to be purely cosmetic or unnecessary for behavioral issues, such as declawing of cats, docking of tails, cropping of ears and debarking on dogs.

== Etymology and nomenclature ==
The word "veterinary" comes from the Latin veterinae meaning "working animals". "Veterinarian" was first used in print by Thomas Browne in 1646. Although "vet" is commonly used as an abbreviation in all English-speaking countries, the occupation is formally referred to as a veterinary surgeon in the United Kingdom and Ireland and now as a veterinarian in most of the rest of the English-speaking world.

== History ==
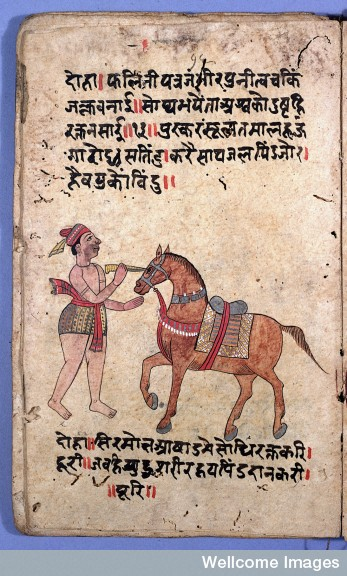
Ancient Indian text, eye operation on a horse

Ancient Indian sage and veterinarian Shalihotra (mythological estimate c. 2350 BCE), the son of a sage, Hayagosha, is considered the founder of veterinary sciences.

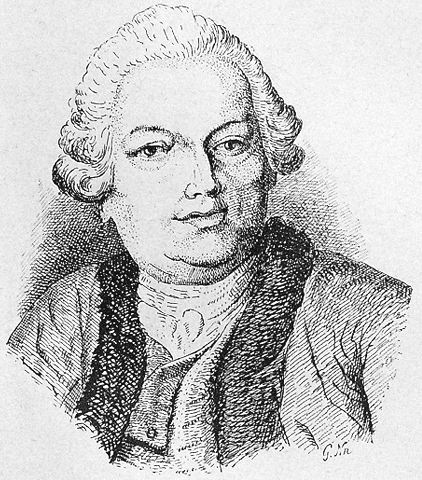
Claude Bourgelat established the earliest veterinary college in Lyon in 1761.

The first veterinary college was founded in Lyon, France, in 1762 by Claude Bourgelat. According to Lupton, after observing the devastation being caused by cattle plague to the French herds, Bourgelat devoted his time to seeking out a remedy. This resulted in his founding a veterinary college in Lyon in 1761, from which establishment he dispatched students to combat the disease; in a short time, the plague was stayed and the health of stock restored, through the assistance rendered to agriculture by veterinary science and art.

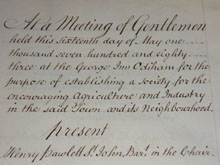
The Odiham Agricultural Society helped establish the veterinary profession in England.

The Odiham Agricultural Society was founded in 1783 in England to promote agriculture and industry, and played an important role in the foundation of the veterinary profession in Britain. A 1785 Society meeting resolved to "promote the study of Farriery upon rational scientific principles."

The professionalization of the veterinary trade was finally achieved in 1790, through the campaigning of Granville Penn, who persuaded the Frenchman Charles Vial de Sainbel to accept the professorship of the newly established Veterinary College in London. The Royal College of Veterinary Surgeons was established by royal charter in 1844.

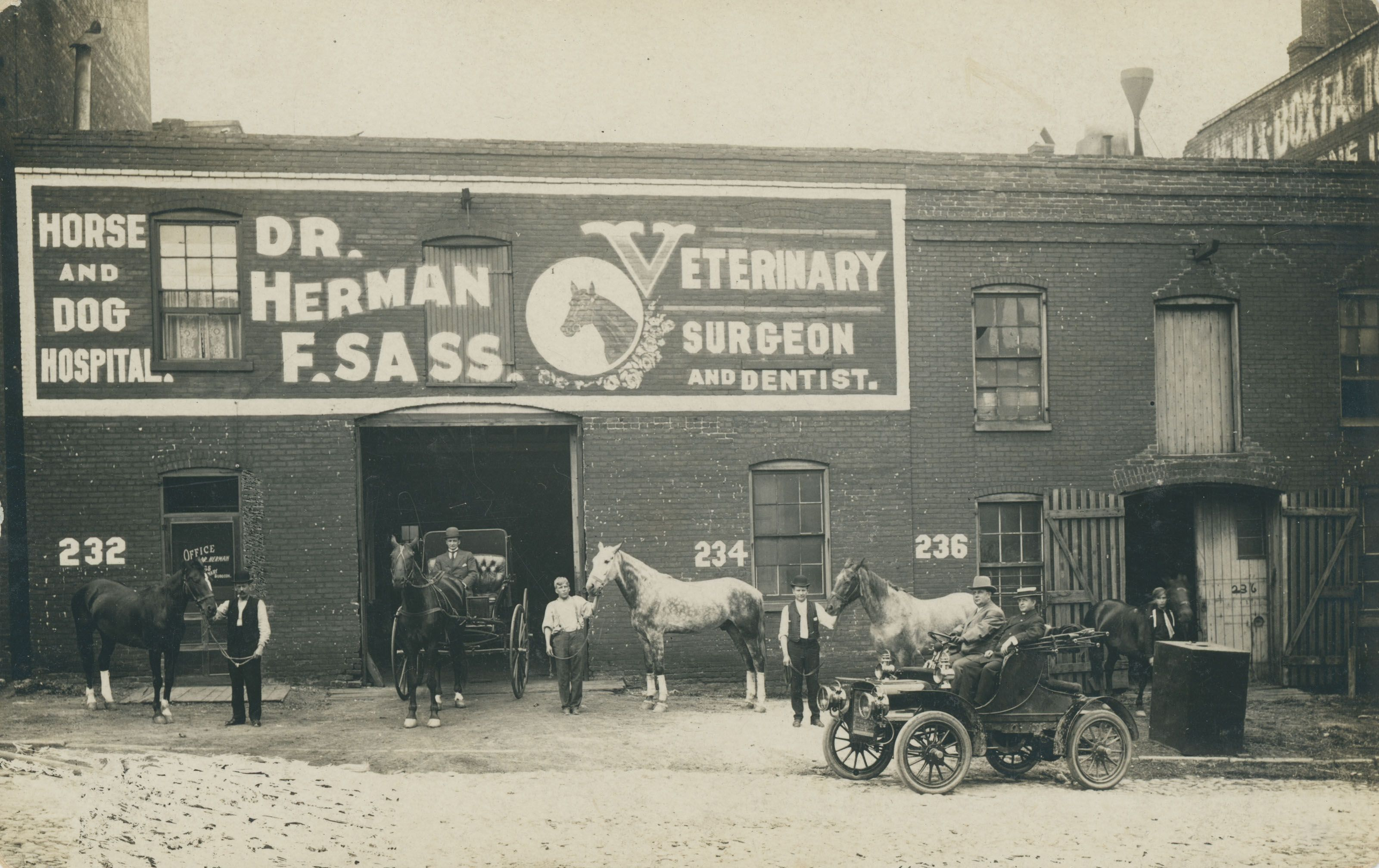
Dr. Herman F. Sass, Veterinary Surgeon, Toledo, Ohio, approximately 1911

Veterinary science came of age in the late 19th century, with notable contributions from Sir John McFadyean, credited by many as having been the founder of modern veterinary research.

== Roles and responsibilities ==
Veterinarians treat disease, disorder or injury in animals, which includes diagnosis, treatment and aftercare. The scope of practice, specialty and experience of the individual veterinarian will dictate exactly what interventions they perform, but most will perform surgery (of differing complexity).

Unlike in human medicine, veterinarians must rely primarily on clinical signs, as animals are unable to vocalize symptoms as a human would. In some cases, owners may be able to provide a medical history and the veterinarian can combine this information along with observations, and the results of pertinent diagnostic tests such as radiography, CT scans, MRI, blood tests, urinalysis and others.

Veterinarians must consider the appropriateness of euthanasia ("putting to sleep") if a condition is likely to leave the animal in pain or with a poor quality of life, or if treatment of a condition is likely to cause more harm to the patient than good, or if the patient is unlikely to survive any treatment regimen. Additionally, there are scenarios where euthanasia is considered due to the constraints of the client's finances.

As with human medicine, much veterinary work is concerned with prophylactic treatment, in order to prevent problems occurring in the future. Common interventions include vaccination against common animal illnesses, such as distemper or rabies, and dental prophylaxis to prevent or inhibit dental disease. This may also involve owner education so as to avoid future medical or behavioral issues.

Additionally, veterinarians play important roles in public health through food safety and zoonotic disease prevention.

== Employment ==
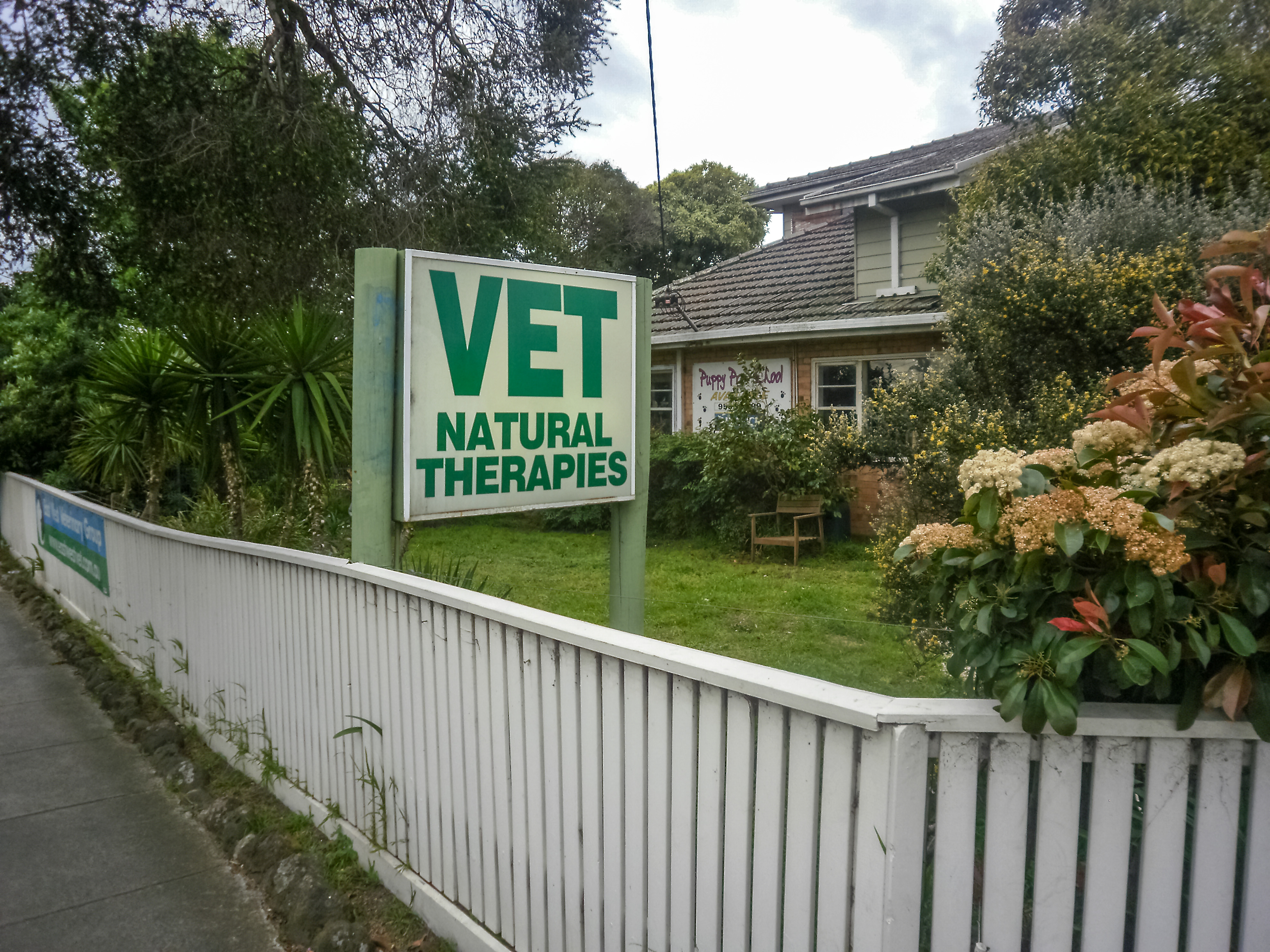
Vet Practice in Victoria, Australia

The majority of veterinarians are employed in private practice treating animals (75% of vets in the United States, according to the American Veterinary Medical Association).

Small animal veterinarians typically work in veterinary clinics, veterinary hospitals, or both. Large animal veterinarians often spend more time travelling to see their patients at the primary facilities which house them, such as zoos or farms.

Other employers include charities treating animals, colleges of veterinary medicine, research laboratories, animal food companies, and pharmaceutical companies. In many countries, the government may also be a major employer of veterinarians, such as the United States Department of Agriculture or the Animal and Plant Health Agency in the United Kingdom. State and local governments also employ veterinarians.

The COVID-19 pandemic has created a greater demand for veterinary services. Many people are home with extra time on their hands, and adoption agencies and animals shelters have seen a surge in pet purchases as a result. The American Veterinary Medical Association has provided COVID-19 resources for veterinarians on prevention measures, animal testing, and wellbeing.

=== Focus of practice ===
Veterinarians and their practices may be specialized in certain areas of veterinary medicine. Areas of focus include:

- Exotic animal veterinarian – Specializes in treating animals other than common pets and livestock. Includes reptiles, exotic birds such as parrots and cockatoos, and small mammals such as ferrets, rabbits, and chinchillas.
- Conservation medicine – The study of the relationship between animal and human health and environmental information.
- Small animal practice – Usually dogs, cats, and other companion animals/household pets such as hamsters and gerbils. Some practices are canine-only or feline-only practices.
- Laboratory animal practice – Some veterinarians work in a university or industrial laboratory and are responsible for the care and treatment of laboratory animals of any species (often involving bovines, porcine species, felines, canines, rodents, and even exotic animals). Their responsibility is not only for the health and well-being of the animals, but also for enforcing humane and ethical treatment of the animals in the facility.
- Large animal practice – Usually referring to veterinarians that work with, variously, livestock and other large farm animals, as well as equine species.
- Equine medicine – Some veterinarians are specialists in equine medicine. Horses are different in anatomy, physiology, pathology, pharmacology, and husbandry to other domestic species. Specialization in equine veterinary practice is something that is normally developed after qualification, even if students do have some interest before graduation.
- Food supply medicine – Some veterinarians deal exclusively or primarily with animals raised for food (such as meat, milk, and eggs). Livestock practitioners may deal with ovine (sheep), bovine (cattle) and porcine (swine) species; such veterinarians deal with management of herds, nutrition, reproduction, and minor field surgery. Dairy medicine practice focuses on dairy animals. Poultry medicine practice focuses on the health of flocks of poultry; the field often involves extensive training in pathology, epidemiology, and nutrition of birds. The veterinarian treats the flock and not the individual animals.
- Food safety practice – Veterinarians are employed by both the food industry and government agencies to advise on and monitor the handling, preparation, and storage of food in ways that prevent foodborne illness.
- Wildlife medicine – A relatively recent branch of veterinary medicine, focusing on wildlife. Wildlife medicine veterinarians may work with zoologists and conservation medicine practitioners and may also be called out to treat marine species such as sea otters, dolphins, or whales after a natural disaster or oil spill.
- Aquatic medicine – mostly refers to veterinary care of fish in aquaculture (like salmon, cod, among other species), but can also include care of aquatic mammals. For certain countries with high economic income from aquaculture, this is an important part of the veterinary field (like Norway, Chile). Other countries (particularly those which are landlocked), might have little or no emphasis on aquatic medicine.
- Dentistry – Many practices are incorporating dentistry into their daily medical services. Veterinary dentistry can extend the life of the patient by preventing oral disease and keeping the teeth and gums of the patient in healthy condition.

=== Veterinary specialties ===
Veterinary specialists are in the minority compared to general practice veterinarians, and tend to be based at points of referral, such as veterinary schools or larger animal hospitals. Unlike human medicine, veterinary specialties often combine both the surgical and medical aspects of a biological system.

Veterinary specialties are accredited in North America by the AVMA through the American Board of Veterinary Specialties, in Europe by the European Board of Veterinary Specialisation and in Australia and New Zealand by the Australasian Veterinary Boards Council. While some veterinarians may have areas of interest outside of recognized specialties, they are not legally specialists.

Specialties can cover general topics such as anesthesiology, dentistry, and surgery, as well as organ system focus such as cardiology or dermatology. A full list can be seen at veterinary specialties.

=== Mobile practice ===
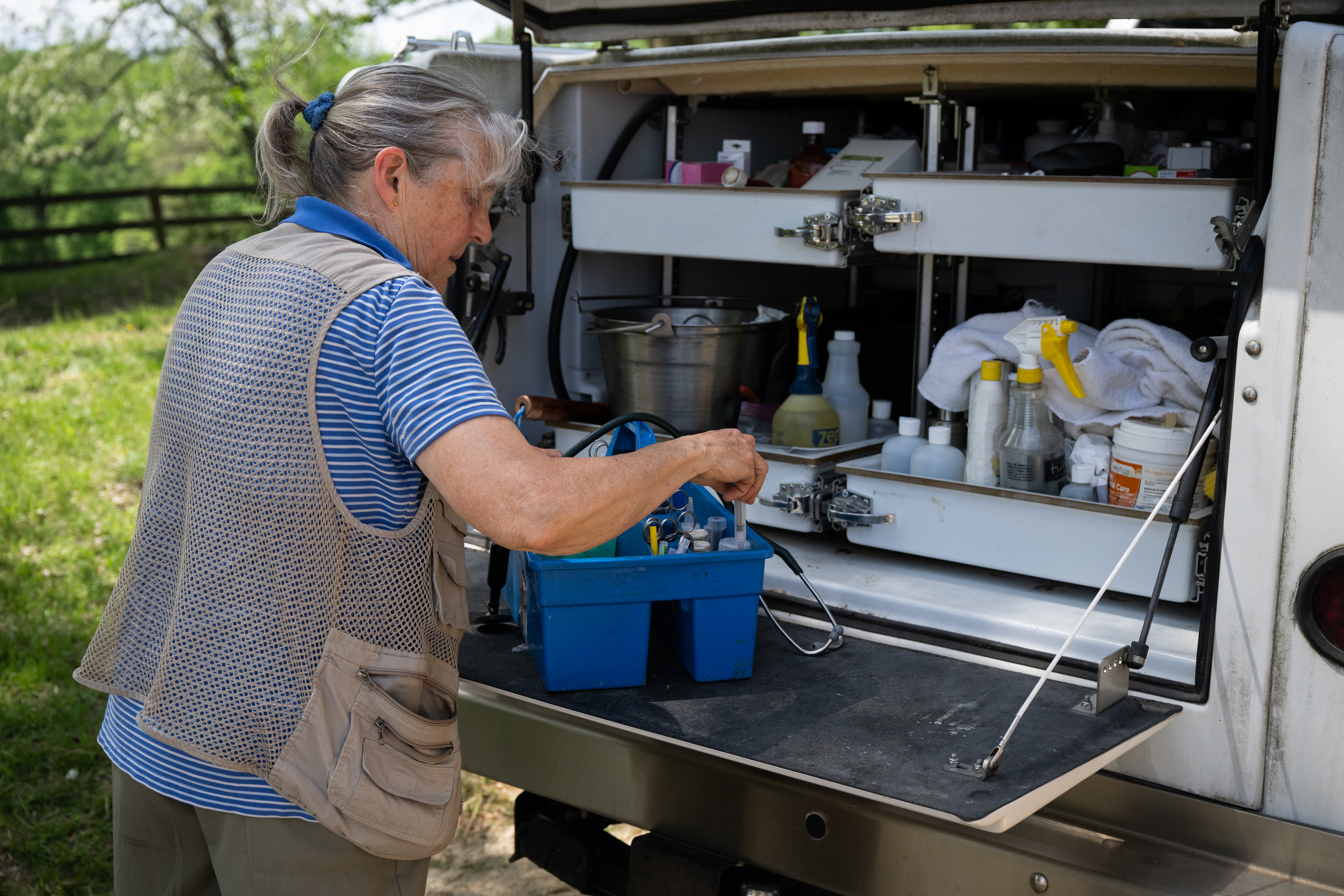
Dr. Nancy Reams, Doctor Veterinary Medicine, with Southern Maryland Equine Veterinary Services, prepares to conduct a general health exam on a horse at Obligation Farm, Hardwood, Md., April 30, 2025. (USDA photo by Christophe Paul)

Many veterinarians, especially in large animal practice, offer house calls and farm calls through a mobile practice. The start-up and operating costs of a mobile practice are typically lower than those of a traditional brick and mortar clinics, which can cost millions of dollars or more for equipment and surgical supplies. Costs associated with mobile units can range from as low as $5,000 for a utility box in an SUV to around $250,000 for a fully equipped custom built chassis. The potential advantages to the client are not having to transport the animal, lower stress for the animal, a lower risk of disease transmission from other animals, and convenience. A 2015 study published in the Journal of American Veterinary Medical Association showed that blood pressure readings, pulse rates and body temperature increased by 11–16% when those readings were done in the clinic versus in the home. However, mobile practices often lack the facilities and equipment to provide advanced care, surgery, or hospitalization. Some mobile practices maintain a relationship with a traditional hospital for referral of cases needing more comprehensive care.

=== Salary ===
The last AVMA Report on Veterinary Compensation, published in 2018, indicated private practice associate veterinarians who had board certification earned a mean of $187,000. A veterinarian's salary can easily exceed $300,000 depending on the specialty. The median starting salary for new veterinary graduates without specialization in 2018 was $103,800 in the United States according to the Bureau of Labor Statistics, while the lowest paid earned less than $89,540 annually. States and districts with the highest mean salary are California ($398,340), Michigan ($325,100), Illinois ($324,870), New York ($322,500), and Hawaii ($221,150). Veterinarians who own their own clinics are typically paid a much higher salary. The average owner payout is $400,000 for every $1,000,000 of clinic income. In 2021 there were practices sold with $8–10,000,000 in yearly revenue with the owners drawing salaries of several million dollars. Over 90% of practice owners do not regret purchasing or starting their own practice, according to a 2020 survey of clinic owners.

Australian salaries were $AU125,476 (roughly US$90,000) in 2025, ranking 64th out of all occupations with salary figures.

== Education and regulation ==
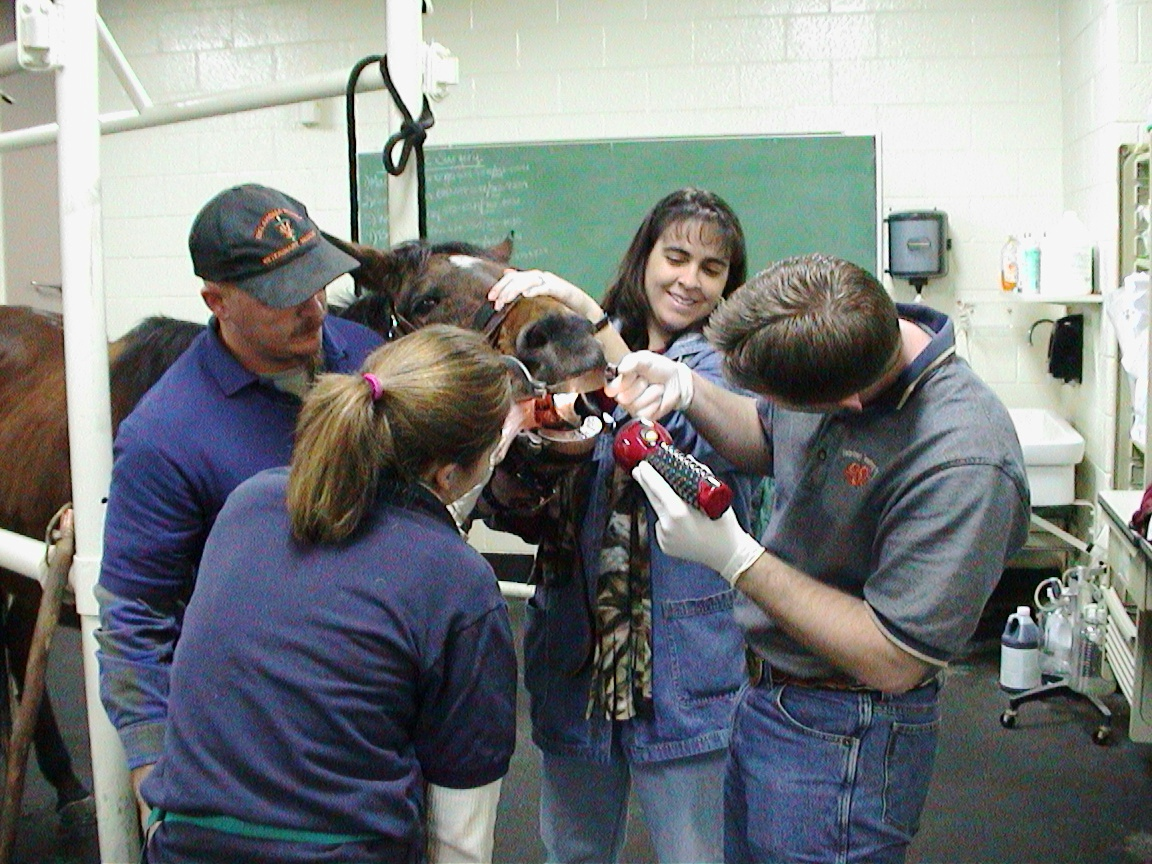
Veterinary students learning the dental treatment of a horse in August 2008

In order to practice, vets must complete an appropriate degree in veterinary medicine, and in most cases must also be registered with the relevant governing body for their jurisdiction.

=== Veterinary science degrees ===
Degrees in veterinary medicine culminate in the award of a veterinary science degree, although the title varies by region. For instance, in North America, graduates will receive a Doctor of Veterinary Medicine (Doctor of Veterinary Medicine or Veterinariae Medicinae Doctor; DVM or VMD), whereas in the United Kingdom, Australia, New Zealand or India they would be awarded a Bachelor of Veterinary Science, Surgery or Medicine (BVS, BVSc, BVetMed or BVMS), and in Ireland graduates receive a Medicinae Veterinariae Baccalaureus (MVB). In continental Europe, the degree of Doctor Medicinae Veterinariae (DMV, DrMedVet, Dr. med. vet., MVDr.) is granted, which in some countries additionally requires the completion of a dissertation including original research.

The award of a bachelor's degree was previously commonplace in the United States, but the degree name and academic standards were upgraded to match the 'doctor' title used by graduates.

Comparatively few universities have veterinary schools that offer degrees which are accredited to qualify the graduates as registered vets. For example, there are 30 in the United States, 5 in Canada, 10 in New Zealand ( 1 offers degrees accredited by the AVMA), 7 in Australia (4 of which offer degrees accredited by the American Veterinary Medical Association (AVMA)), and 12 in the United Kingdom (6 of which offer degrees accredited by the American Veterinary Medical Association (AVMA)).

Due to this scarcity of places for veterinary degrees, admission to veterinary school is competitive and requires extensive preparation. In the United States in 2007, approximately 5,750 applicants competed for the 2,650 seats in the 28 accredited veterinary schools, with an acceptance rate of 46%.

With competitive admission, many schools may place heavy emphasis and consideration on a candidate's veterinary and animal experience. Formal experience is a particular advantage to the applicant, often consisting of work with veterinarians or scientists in clinics, agribusiness, research, or some area of health science. Less formal experience is also helpful for the applicant to have, and this includes working with animals on a farm or ranch or at a stable or animal shelter and basic overall animal exposure.

In the United States, approximately 80% of admitted students are female. In the early history of veterinary medicine of the United States, most veterinarians were males. However, in the 1990s this ratio reached parity, and now it has been reversed.

Preveterinary courses should emphasize the sciences. Most veterinary schools typically require applicants to have taken one year equivalent classes in organic, inorganic chemistry, physics, general biology; and one semester of vertebrate embryology and biochemistry. Usually, the minimal mathematics requirement is college level calculus. Individual schools might require introduction to animal science, livestock judging, animal nutrition, cell biology, and genetics. However, due to the limited availability of these courses, many schools have removed these requirements to widen the pool of possible applicants.

=== Registration and licensing ===
Following academic education, most countries require a vet to be registered with the relevant governing body, and to maintain this license to practice.

According to the Bureau of Labor Statistics, veterinarians must be licensed to practice in the United States. Licensing entails passing an accredited program, a national exam, and a state exam. For instance, in the United States, a prospective vet must receive a passing grade on a national board examination, the North America Veterinary Licensing Exam. This exam must be completed over the course of eight hours, and consists of 360 multiple-choice questions, covering all aspects of veterinary medicine, as well as visual material designed to test diagnostic skills.

=== Postgraduate study ===
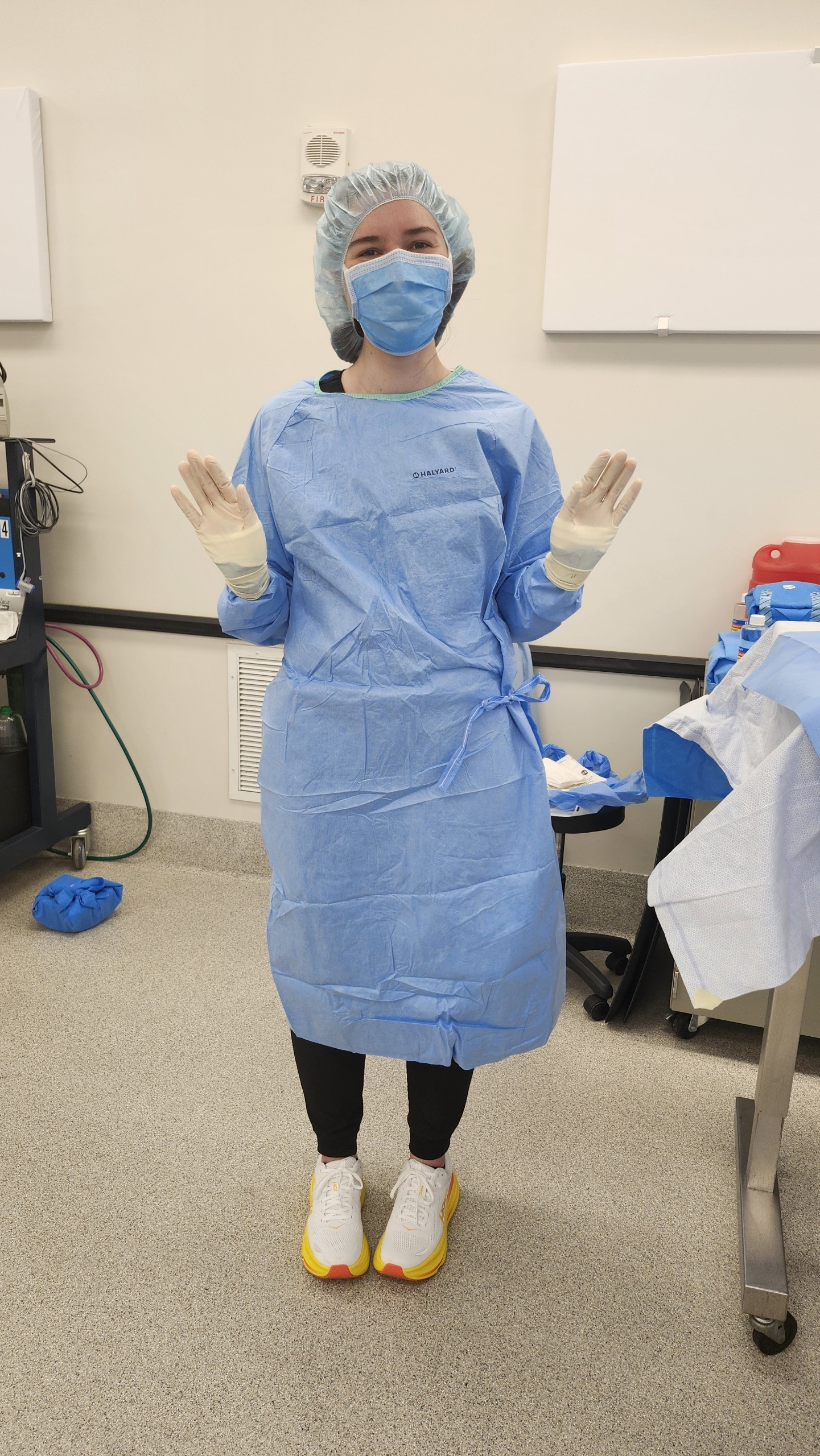
Postgraduate veterinarian student in medical gear preparing for procedures

The percentage electing to undertake further study following registration in the United States has increased from 36.8% to 39.9% in 2008. About 25% of those or about 9% of graduates were accepted into traditional academic internships. Approximately 9% of veterinarians eventually board certify in one of 40 distinct specialties from 22 specialty organizations recognized by the AVMA American Board of Veterinary Specialties (ABVS).

==== ABVS recognized veterinary specialties ====
Anesthesiology and analgesia	Animal welfare	Avian practice
Bacteriology and mycology	Beef cattle practice	Behavior
Canine and feline medicine	Cardiology	Dairy practice
Dentistry	Dermatology	Exotic animal medicine
Emergency and critical care	Equine medicine	Epidemiology
Laboratory animal medicine	Orthopaedics	Internal medicine
Pathology	Pharmacology	Poultry medicine
Reproductive medicine	Radiation oncology	Radiology
Shelter medicine	Surgery	Swine health management
Toxicology	Virology	Zoological medicine

=== Curriculum comparison with human medicine ===
The first two-year curriculum in both veterinary and human medical schools are very similar in course names, but in certain subjects are relatively different in content. Considering the courses, the first two-year curriculum usually includes biochemistry, physiology, histology, anatomy, pharmacology, microbiology, epidemiology, pathology and hematology.

Some veterinary schools use the same biochemistry, histology, and microbiology books as human medical students; however, the course content is greatly supplemented to include the varied animal diseases and species differences. In the past, many veterinarians were trained in pharmacology using the same text books used by physicians. As the specialty of veterinary pharmacology has developed, more schools are using pharmacology textbooks written specifically for veterinarians. Veterinary physiology, anatomy, and histology is complex, as physiology often varies among species. Microbiology and virology of animals share the same foundation as human microbiology, but with grossly different disease manifestation and presentations. Epidemiology is focused on herd health and prevention of herd borne diseases and foreign animal diseases. Pathology, like microbiology and histology, is very diverse and encompasses many species and organ systems. Most veterinary schools have courses in small animal and large animal nutrition, often taken as electives in the clinical years or as part of the core curriculum in the first two years.

The final two-year curriculum is similar to that of human medicine only in clinical emphasis. A veterinary student must be well prepared to be a fully functional veterinarian on the day of graduation, competent in both surgery and medicine. The graduating veterinarian must be able to pass medical board examination and be prepared to enter clinical practice on the day of graduation, while most human medical doctors in the United States complete 3 to 5 years of post-doctoral residency before practicing medicine independently, usually in a very narrow and focused specialty. Many veterinarians do also complete a post-doctoral residency, but it is not nearly as common as it is in human medicine.

In the last years, curricula in both human and veterinary medicine have been adapted with the aim of incorporating competency-based teaching. Furthermore, the importance of institutionalized systematic teacher feedback has been recognized and tools such as clinical encounter cards are being implemented in clinical veterinary education.

== Impact on human medicine ==
Some veterinarians pursue post-graduate training and enter research careers and have contributed to advances in many human and veterinary medical fields, including pharmacology and epidemiology. Research veterinarians were the first to isolate oncoviruses, Salmonella species, Brucella species, and various other pathogenic agents. Veterinarians were at the forefront in the effort to suppress malaria and yellow fever in the United States. Veterinarians identified the botulism disease-causing agent, developed propofol; a widely used anesthetic induction drug, produced an anticoagulant used to treat human heart disease, and developed surgical techniques for humans, such as hip-joint replacement, limb and organ transplants.

== Occupational hazards ==
Veterinarians work with a wide variety of animal species typically in hospitals, clinics, labs, farms, and zoos. Veterinarians face many occupational hazards including zoonotic diseases, bites and scratches, hazardous drugs, needlestick injuries, ionizing radiation, and noise. According to the U.S. Department of Labor, 12% of workers in the veterinary services profession reported a work-related injury or illness in 2016.

Veterinary practices need a health and safety plan that addresses infection prevention and other hazards. Workplaces should utilize engineering controls, administrative controls, and personal protective equipment to keep their employees safe. PPE such as gloves, safety goggles, lab coats, and hearing protection should be readily available with mandatory training on proper usage. Raising awareness is the most important step in promoting workplace health and safety.

=== Biological and chemical hazards ===
Needlestick injuries are the most common accidents among veterinarians, but they are likely underreported. Needlesticks can result in hazardous drug or bloodborne-pathogen exposures.

Unlike human medical professionals, veterinarians receive minimal training on safe handling of hazardous drugs in school. Also, a large percentage of veterinarians are women of reproductive age and drug exposures put them at risk of infertility or other adverse health outcomes. Additionally, some antibiotics, steroids, and chemotherapy drugs are known to have negative effects on male fertility. The U.S. National Institute for Occupational Safety and Health has issued guidance on the safe handling of hazardous drugs for veterinary workers. Animal bites and scratches are another common injury in veterinary practice.

The close interactions with animals put veterinarians at increased risk of contracting zoonoses. A systematic review of veterinary students found that between 17% and 64% had acquired a zoonotic disease during their studies. The animal species, work setting, health and safety practices, and training can all affect the risk of injury and illness.

=== Physical hazards ===
Noise can be a prominent exposure, in which case a hearing loss prevention program may be recommended. A NIOSH study on kennel noise found that noise levels often exceeded OSHA's permissible exposure limit. Reducing noise is beneficial for animal and human health.

=== Psychosocial hazards ===
Veterinarians have high suicide rates in comparison to the general population. A study by the U.S. Centers for Disease Control and Prevention found that male veterinarians are 2.1 times and female veterinarians are 3.5 times as likely as the general population to die by suicide. Some reasons for this could be long hours, work overload, client expectations and complaints, poor remuneration, euthanasia procedures, and poor work-life balance. A survey of more than 11,000 vets found 9% had serious psychological distress, 31% experienced depressive episodes, and 17% had suicidal ideation. Online support groups, such as Not One More Vet, have been established to help veterinarians who may be experiencing suicidal thoughts. NOMV educates veterinarians and vet techs about other ways to help themselves with mental health. Another driver of stress can be student loan debt. A 2013 national survey found that average debt for veterinary medicine graduates was as high as $162,113. Veterinarian lifelong earning potential is less than a physician, so it can take a lot longer to break even.

== In popular culture ==
Reality televisions shows featuring veterinarians include:

- Bondi Vet, an Australian factual television series documenting the work of veterinary surgeon Chris Brown at the Bondi Junction Veterinary Hospital.
- Dr. Oakley, Yukon Vet, about a Canadian veterinarian in the Yukon two of whose daughters assist her.
- The Incredible Dr. Pol, a US veterinarian reality show. Produced by National Geographic Wild, a Disney channel. It follows the life of Dr. Jan Pol and Pol Veterinarian Service in Michigan.
- E-Vet Interns (1998–2002), a US show filmed at Alameda East Veterinary Hospital in Denver, Colorado.
- Emergency Vets, filmed at Alameda East Veterinary Hospital in Denver, Colorado.
- Rookie Vets (2005), featuring students at Massey University in New Zealand.
- Vet School Confidential (2001), following students at Michigan State University College of Veterinary Medicine in the US.
- Vets in Practice (1997–2002), a British series.

Fictional works featuring a veterinarian as the main protagonist include:

- James Herriot's series of books containing fictionalized stories of his career as a farm animal veterinarian in England, which was adapted as the BBC television series All Creatures Great and Small.
- The Three Lives of Thomasina about Andrew MacDhui, a veterinarian in a village in Scotland.
- The Doctor Dolittle series of children's books, which have thrice been adapted into movies, Doctor Dolittle (1967), Dr. Dolittle (1998), and Dolittle (2020).
- The movie Beethoven, featuring the evil veterinarian Dr. Herman Varnick.

== Veterinary malpractice ==
Most states in the US allow for malpractice lawsuit in case of death or injury to an animal from professional negligence. Usually the penalty is not greater than the value of the animal. Some states allow for punitive penalty, loss of companionship, and suffering, likely increasing the cost of veterinary malpractice insurance and the cost of veterinary care. Most veterinarians carry business, worker's compensation, and facility insurance to protect their clients and workers from injury inflicted by animals.

== See also ==
- Veterinary medicine in the United Kingdom
- Veterinary medicine in the United States
- List of monuments to veterinarians
