= Friedrich Jacob Behrend =

German physician (1803–1889)

Friedrich Jacob Behrend (12 June 1803 in Neustettin – 30 May 1889 in Berlin) was a German medical doctor known for his published works, in particular, subjects dealing with sexually transmitted disease, public hygiene and prostitution. He is also credited with translating a number of foreign language medical works into German.

He studied medicine at the University of Königsberg, receiving his medical doctorate in 1826.

In 1838, he founded Syphilidologie. In 1842 he translated into German William Wallace's A Treatise on the Venereal Disease and Its Varieties (1833).

In 1829 he settled in Berlin, where he was employed by the municipal police department as a medical examiner of prostitutes. In 1876 he became chief physician of the Sittenpolize with the title of Geheimer Sanitätsrath.

== Published works ==
- Ikonographische Darstellung der Nichtsyphilitischen Hautkrankheiten Leipzig, 1839; The iconographic representation of non-syphilitic skin diseases.
- Ikonographische Darstellung der Beinbrüche und Verrenkungen, Leipzig, 1845; The iconographic representation of leg fractures and dislocations.
- Prostitution in Berlin und die Gegen die Syphilis zu Nehmenden Massregeln, Erlangen, 1850; Prostitution in Berlin, etc.
- Die Oeffentlichen Bäder und Waschanstalten, Ihr Nutzen und Ihr Ertrag, ib. 1854; About public baths and wash-houses, especially in England.
- Die Kanalisirung der Stadt Berlin in Gesundheitlicher Beziehung Berlin, 1866. The canalization of the city of Berlin in relation to health.

He contributed numerous essays to Johann Nepomuk Rust's "Magazins für die gesammte Heilkunde", Christoph Wilhelm Hufeland's "Journal der Praktischen Arznei und Wundarzneikunde" and to Adolph Henke's "Zeitschrift für die Staatsarzneikunde". He was also an editor to the following medical works and journals:

- Allgemeines Repertorium der Medizinisch-Chirurgischen Journalistik des Auslandes, 22 volumes, Berlin, 1829–35.
- Bibliothek von Vorlesungen der Vorzüglichsten und Berühmtesten Jetzt Lebenden Aerzte, Wundärzte und Geburtshelfer des Auslandes über Medizin, Chirurgie, und Geburtshilfe, 23 volumes, Leipzig, 1833–41.
- Syphilidologie oder die Neuesten Erfahrungen, Beobachtungen, und Fortschritte des Inlandes und Auslandes über die Erkenntniss und Behandlung der Venerischen Krankheiten, Leipzig, 1838–40.
- Journal für Kinderkrankheiten, Berlin and Erlangen, 1843–72 (with A.Hildebrandt).
