= Thomas Bateman (physician) =

British dermatologist (1778–1821)

Thomas Bateman (29 April 1778 – 9 April 1821) was a British medical doctor and a pioneer in the field of dermatology who was a native of Whitby, Yorkshire.

== Life ==
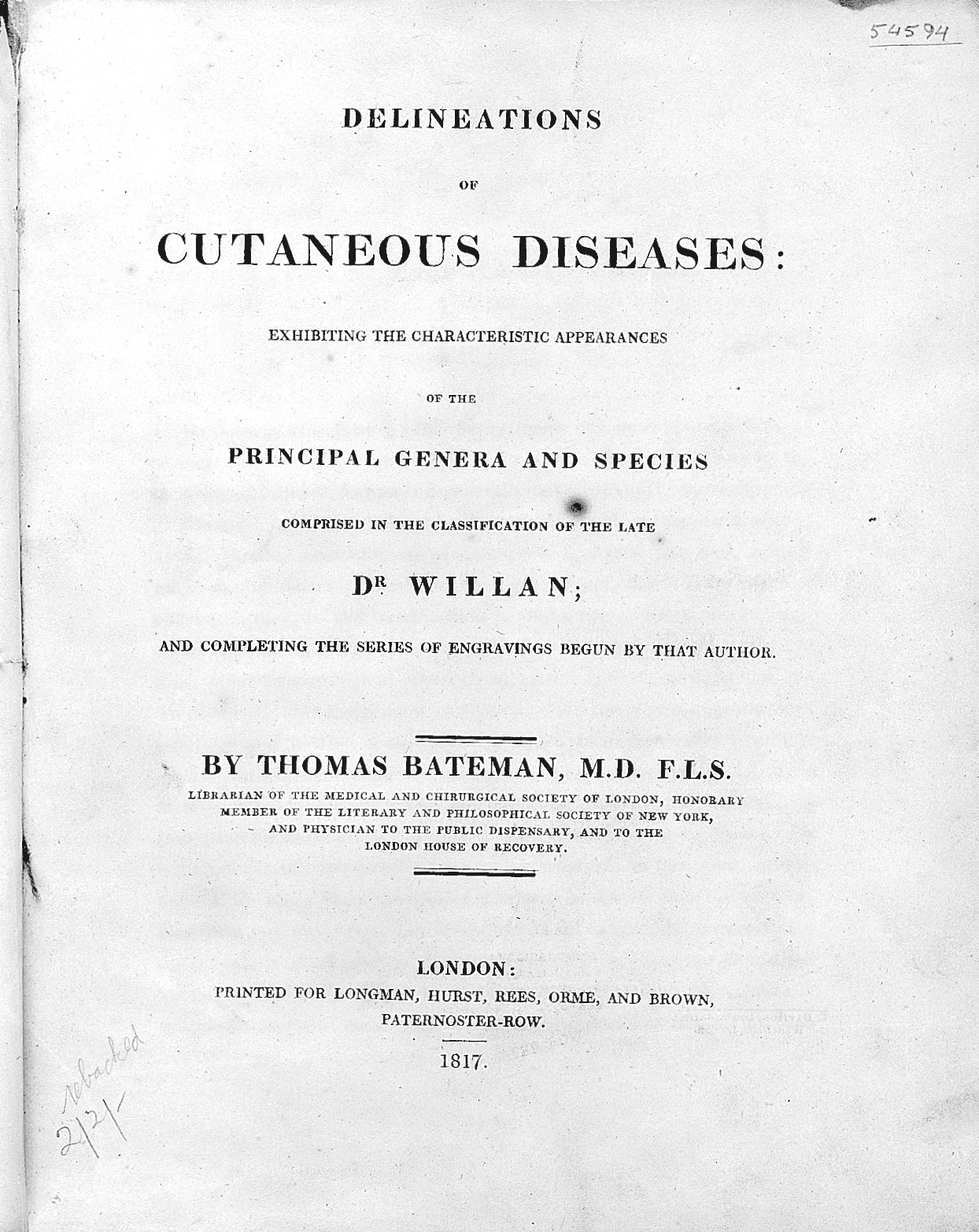
Delineations of Cutaneous Disease

He earned his medical degree from the Edinburgh Medical School. Bateman was a student, colleague and successor to Robert Willan (1757–1812) in regards to modern dermatological practices of classification.

Prior to the 19th century, classification of skin diseases were based on symptomatic characteristics. Dr. Willan was the first to propose a rational naming standard based on the appearance of the skin disorder. In the treatise On Cutaneous Diseases, Willan was the first to classify skin diseases from an anatomical point of view. However, Willan died in 1812, leaving Bateman to continue and expand on the work of his mentor. In 1813 Bateman published A Practical Synopsis of Cutaneous Diseases According to the Arrangement of Dr Willan, and in 1817 published an atlas called the Delineations of Cutaneous Disease. Today there is a copy of the atlas in the library of the Royal College of Physicians in London.

Bateman is credited for providing names and descriptions for a number of dermatological diseases, including lichen urticatus, alopecia areata, erythema multiforme and molluscum contagiosum. The work of Willan and Bateman influenced many physicians, such as Thomas Addison (1793–1860), who was a pupil of Bateman, and Laurent-Théodore Biett (1781–1840), who introduced their methodology into French medicine.
