= Monument to the first-grader (Rostov-on-Don) =

- Russian: Памятник первокласснику
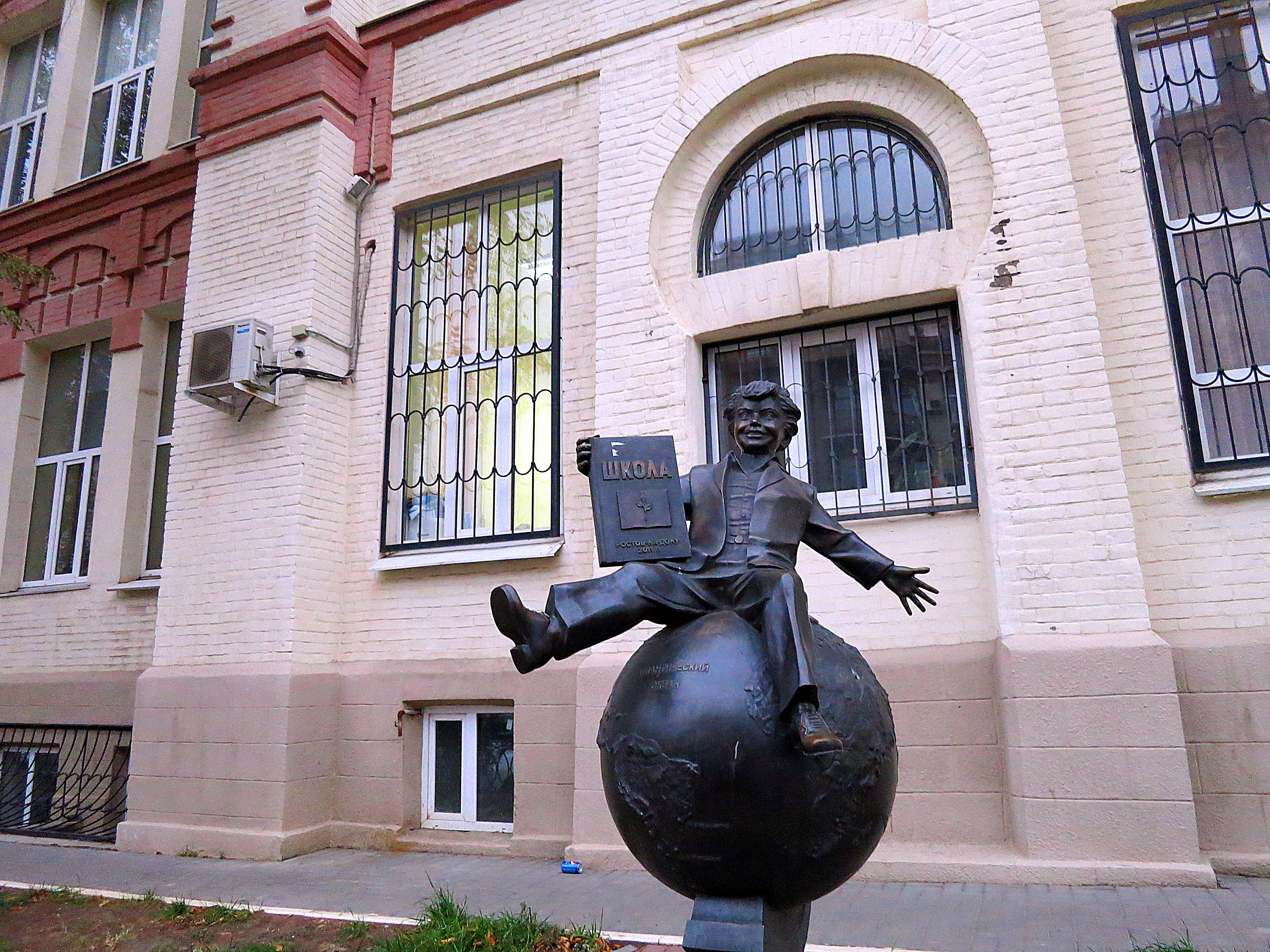
- Interactive map of Monument to the first-grader
- Location: courtyard of the gymnasium No.36, Rostov-on-Don, Russia
- Designer: Anna Nikolaeva, sculptor Dmitry Lyndin
- Material: bronze
- Height: 2 m (6 ft 7 in)
- Opening date: September 1, 2011

Monument to the first-grader (Russian: Памятник первокласснику) is a bronze monument which is located in the courtyard of the gymnasium № 36 on Gorky Street, 115 in the Leninsky district of Rostov-on-Don.

== History ==
The initiative to create the monument belongs to the head of the Leninsky district of Rostov-on-Don Sergey Suhariev. In his interview, he noted that at the initial stages of the development of the project, he wanted the final sculpture to resemble Kid from the Soviet animation film of "Kid and Karlsson, who Lives on the Roof" based on Astrid Lindgren's story Eric and Karlsson-on-the-Roof.

The winner of the contest was Anna Nikolaeva - a student of 9 "B" class of gymnasium № 36. Money for the creation of the monument was provided by sponsors and Dmitry Lyndin was selected as a sculptor.

He created a sculpture from the pencil sketch of the student. It took about six months to create the monument, it was cast in one of the workshops of Rostov-on-Don.

== Description ==
The monument is made of bronze, its height is about 2 meters, weight is half a ton. The monument depicts a laughing first-grader boy dressed in school uniform. He sits on the globe and holds a book in his hands. According to the sculptor this monument combines the features of a real first-grader who equally enthusiastically knows how to learn and have fun.

== See also ==
- Monument to veterinarians, another monument by Lyndin in Rostov-on-Don
