= Emergency Vets =

- Genre: Reality Television
- Country of origin: United States
- Original language: English

Production
- Production locations: Aurora, Colorado, USA
- Production company: Rocket Pictures

Original release
- Network: Animal Planet
- Release: February 1, 1998 – May 14, 2008

Emergency Vets is a reality television series that aired on Animal Planet. First aired in 1998, it depicts the working and outside lives of the veterinarians at Alameda East Veterinary Hospital in Denver, Colorado, plus the animals that they treat. At its peak of popularity, Emergency Vets alternated with The Crocodile Hunter as Animal Planet's most popular show.

The show stopped first-run production because Alameda East was occupied with building and eventually moving into a new facility in Denver. In 2004, a new documentary called E-Vets: The Cutting Edge aired on Animal Planet, showing the changes in Alameda East Veterinary Hospital since the show's final episode. The documentary scored good ratings and has been rerun several times as part of the Whoa! Sunday umbrella anthology show on Animal Planet, as well as inspiring a follow-up episode first aired in 2005 that took viewers on a tour of the new Alameda East facility while showing cases of animals receiving cutting-edge treatment at the new hospital. Another documentary, Emergency Vets 20 Most Unusual Cases, aired on Whoa! Sunday in 2006, featuring 20 cases from the series including follow-ups with the families and interviews with the doctors involved.

In 2007, Animal Planet announced that the real-life drama at Alameda East would return to prime-time airwaves under a new title, E-Vet Interns. The new series features six new veterinary interns during their first year of residency practice at the new Alameda East hospital, as well as familiar faces Dr. Robert Taylor, Dr. Kevin Fitzgerald, Dr. Preston Stubbs, and Dr. Holly Knor. In preparation for the new show's debut on January 22, 2007, Animal Planet aired a new E-Vets special, E-Vets: Things Pets Swallow, featuring memorable cases from the Emergency Vets years dealing with dramatic objects that animals have ingested.

== Staff ==
Emergency Vets features a mix of surgeons, general practitioners, specialists, veterinary technicians, and Alameda East's annual class of 4–6 interns per year. Among the staff members featured regularly:

=== Surgeons ===
- Dr. Robert A. Taylor, founder of Alameda East, who specializes in orthopedic surgery
- Dr. Steve Petersen, surgeon and director of Alameda East's intern program who left the hospital and the show in 1999
- Dr. Mark Albrecht, surgeon who replaced Petersen in the 2000 season; departed the hospital before the start of the 2001 season
- Dr. Preston Stubbs, surgeon who replaced Albrecht after his departure in the 2001 season

=== General Practitioners ===
- Dr. Kevin Fitzgerald, general practitioner who specializes in treating exotic animals, especially reptiles
- Dr. Holly Knor, general practitioner specializing in animal pregnancies and associated issues
- Dr. Andrea Oncken, general practitioner who left the hospital and the show in 1998
- Dr. Jeff Steen, graduate of the Alameda East intern program who joined the staff as a general practitioner in 2000; specializes in dental issues
- Dr. Ted Owen, DVM, Western Carolina Regional Animal Hospital
- Dr. Fred Rosen, DVM, Western Carolina Regional Animal Hospital
- Dr. Michelle L. Foot, DVM, Western Carolina Regional Animal Hospital
- Dr. Brandon T. Hughes, DVM, Western Carolina Regional Animal Hospital
- Dr. Bill Gibson, DVM, Western Carolina Regional Animal Hospital

=== Specialists ===
- Caroline Adamson (now Adrian), head of Alameda East's physical therapy department
- Dr. Dan Steinheimer, chief of radiology; director of Alameda East's intern program after Petersen's departure
- Dr. David Panciera, internal medicine specialist who left the hospital and the show in 1998 to take a professorship at Virginia Tech in Blacksburg, Virginia
- Dr. Doug Santen, internal medicine specialist
- Dr. Lauren Prause, internal medicine specialist who replaced Panciera in 1998 and left the show in 2000
- Dr. Etta Wertz, chief of anesthesiology who left the show in 2000
- Dr. James Bailey, consulting veterinary anesthesiologist
- Dr. Ric Olsen, human dentist who serves as an associate dentist at Alameda East

=== Veterinary Technicians ===
- Rebecca Barwick, vet tech who adopts an owner-surrendered German Shepherd in the episode "Perfectly Imperfect"
- Dr. John Fiddler, vet tech who returned to Alameda East after graduating from veterinary school to become an intern veterinarian, leaving the show in 2000
- Ray Parham, CVT Sr. vet tech specializing in radiology procedures
- Jackie Steinheimer (née Lenz), Sr. vet tech who later married Dan Steinheimer and now runs Alameda East's Associate Staff program
- Jean Wilbert, vet tech often featured giving chemotherapy to animals undergoing cancer treatments
- Laura Maez, vet tech during the ringworm episode, now works at another Denver Area ER clinic

=== Interns ===
- Dr. Rani Pheneger (now Reyter), graduate of the Alameda East intern program who left the hospital and the show in 1998
- Dr. Juli White, graduate of the Alameda East intern program who left the hospital and the show in 1998
- Dr. Karin Cannizzo, graduate of the Alameda East intern program who left the hospital and the show in 1998
- Dr. Dennis Crow, graduate of the Alameda East intern program who left the hospital and the show in 1998
- Dr. Craig Webb, graduate of the Alameda East intern program who stayed an extra six months after his internship on a special assignment before leaving the hospital and the show in 1999
- Dr. Milan Hess, graduate of the Alameda East intern program who left the hospital and the show in 1999
- Dr. Sandy Wang, graduate of the Alameda East intern program who left the hospital and the show in 1999
- Dr. Laura Peycke, graduate of the Alameda East intern program who left the hospital and the show in 1999
- Dr. Amy Estrada, graduate of the Alameda East intern program who left the hospital and the show in 1999
- Dr. Katie Miller, graduate of the Alameda East intern program who left the hospital and the show in 1999
- Dr. Corey Wall, graduate of the Alameda East intern program who left the hospital and the show in 2000
- Dr. Jason Wheeler, graduate of the Alameda East intern program who left the hospital and the show in 2000 to work alongside Dr. Steve Petersen at another Denver-area animal hospital. Then in 2012 moved to Virginia to open a veterinary referral practice.
- Dr. Carrie Stephaniak, graduate of the Alameda East intern program who left the hospital and the show in 2000

== E-Vet Interns ==
E-Vet Interns is a reality television series about veterinary interns working at Alameda East Veterinary Hospital in Denver, Colorado. It is a spinoff of Emergency Vets. E-Vet Interns began airing on January 22, 2007, also on Animal Planet.
