= Gymnasium No. 36 =

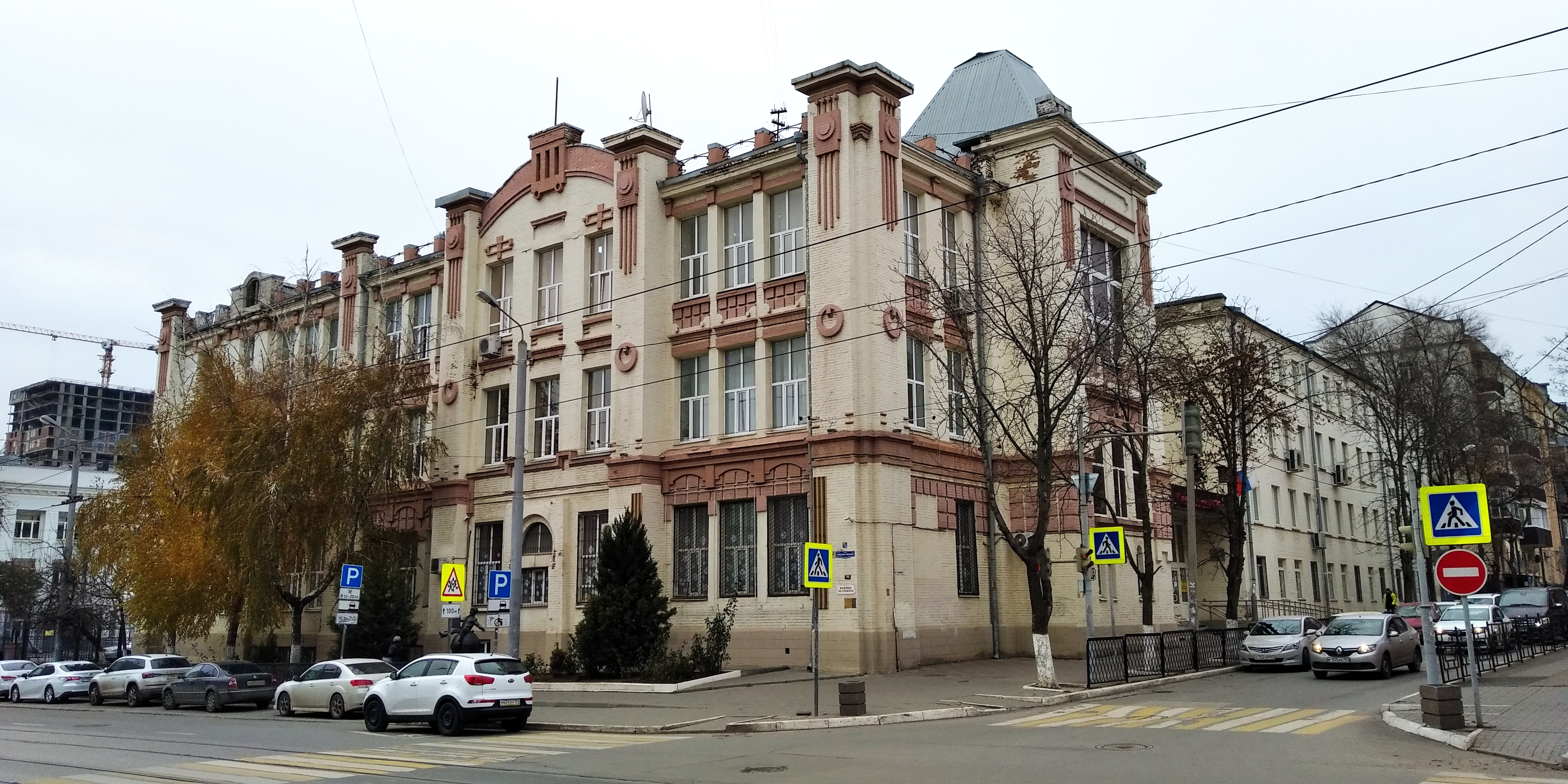
- Interactive map of Gymnasium No. 36
- Location: Rostov-on-Don, Rostov Oblast, Russia
- Coordinates: 47°13′32″N 39°42′28″E

Gymnasium №36 is a public school in Rostov-on-Don, Russia. Opened in 1915, the building was designed by architect I. Y. Lyubimov.

== History ==
In 1906 State Councilor Nikolai Stepanov opened a four-year school for boys in Rostov-on-Don. Initially, it was located in the premises of the former orphanage, but several years later Stepanov decided to build a separate building for the gymnasium. The new gymnasium building was built in 1915. It initially accepted boys from ages 14 to 15. The tuition fees for the preparatory class were 100 rubles, and for the first class, 130 rubles. From 1916 girls were accepted at the gymnasium.

The gymnasium was active during the Russian Civil War. In 1920 it was transformed into the first-level labour school No. 95. In 1922, on the basis of the elementary classes of school No. 95, the school of the first and second stage No. 24, named after Leon Trotsky, was opened. In 1926 this became the seven-year Trotsky School No. 5. In 1928 documents the educational institution was listed as Rostov-on-Don Co-Op-School No. 9. By 1938 it was called Maxim Gorky Secondary School No. 36. In 1962 school number 36 introduced the teaching of a number of subjects in English. In 1997 the school became Gymnasium No. 36.

In 2007 Gymnasium No. 36 was among the winners of the All-Russian Contest "The Best Schools in Russia".

== Description ==
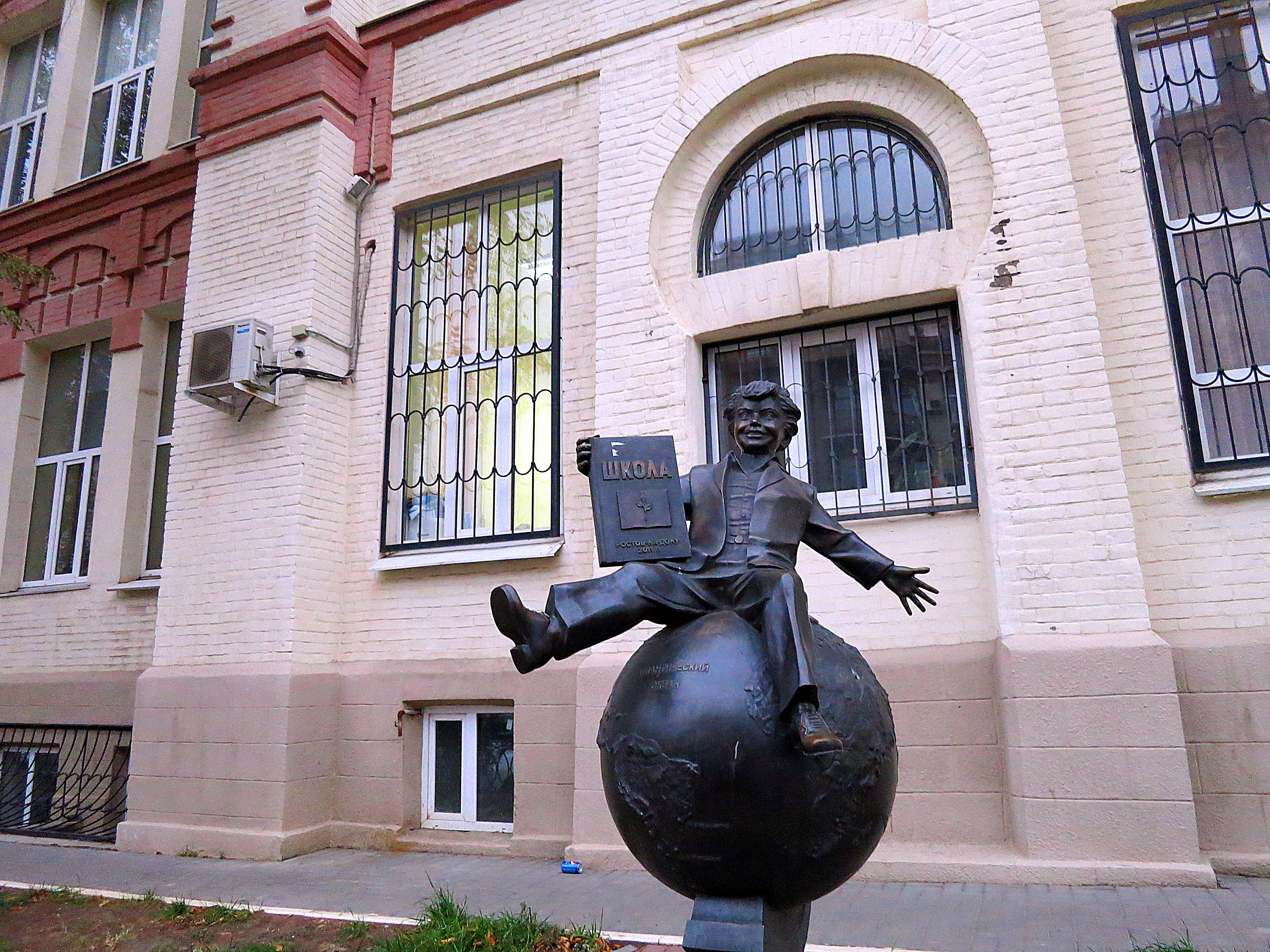
The Monument to the first-grader, in the gymnasium's grounds

The brick building of the school has three floors and a basement. The roof is four-tiered with a tent on the north-eastern side. The building is located in the corner of Maxim Gorky Street and Soborny Lane.

On 1 September 2011 the Monument to the first-grader, depicting a schoolboy sitting on a globe, was unveiled at the entrance to the gymnasium.
