= Michigan State University College of Veterinary Medicine =

Veterinary school in Michigan, US

Coordinates: 42.722644°N 84.470676°W

- Type: Public
- Established: 1910
- Dean: Dr. Kimberly Dodd
- Students: 434
- Location: East Lansing, Michigan, United States
- Campus: Rural
- Website: https://cvm.msu.edu/
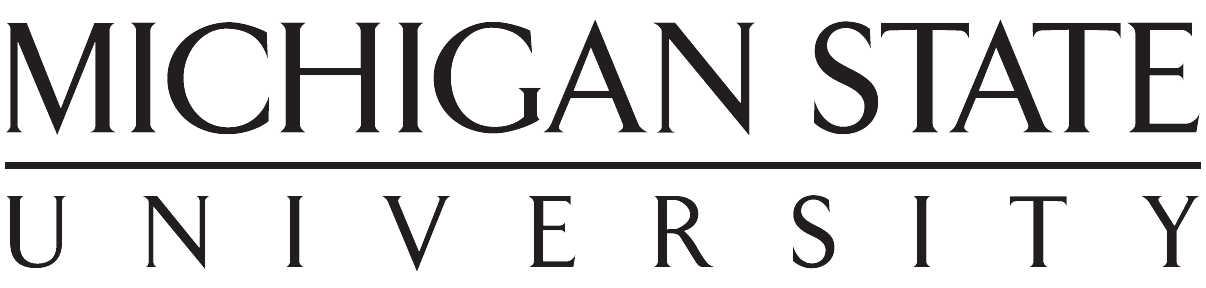

The Michigan State University College of Veterinary Medicine (CVM) is a veterinary college in the United States that was founded in 1910 and awards about 100 Doctor of Veterinary Medicine (DVM) degrees each year. It is the only veterinary college in Michigan. It is composed of the departments of Large Animal Clinical Sciences, Small Animal Clinical Sciences, Microbiology, Pharmacology and Toxicology, Physiology, and Pathobiology and Diagnostic Investigation. It offers a four-year program leading to the DVM as well as graduate study leading to the Master of Science (MS) and PhD, and recently a joint program in veterinary medicine and public health (DVM/MPH), affiliated with University of Minnesota's School of Public Health. It also runs an accredited veterinary technology program, the equivalent of a human nursing program, that offers options for a Bachelor of Science degree or a certificate of completion. The college was the setting for the show Vet School Confidential, which originally aired on Animal Planet in 2001.

== History ==
When Michigan State University opened in 1855, the school provided education in veterinary science as part of its agricultural mission. The first veterinarian joined the faculty at MSU in 1883. The veterinary school was established in 1910.

== Michigan State University Veterinary Center ==
The Michigan State University Veterinary Medical Center is part of the college, and provides veterinary medical services in 18 specialty clinics. About 30,000 cases, primarily companion animals and horses, are treated annually. In the past it has treated Zeke the Wonder Dog and the Arabian horses that performed at Michigan State Spartans football games.
