= Kevin Fitzgerald =

American veterinarian (born 1951)

Kevin Terrel Fitzgerald (born September 23, 1951), an American veterinarian who works at Alameda East Veterinary Hospital in his native Denver, Colorado is best known through his visibility on the Animal Planet reality show Emergency Vets and, more recently, E-Vet Interns. Fitzgerald also does stand-up comedy and a little tap dancing. In 2001, he was named one of the 50 most eligible bachelors by People. From 1999 to 2006, he was a victim of stalking.

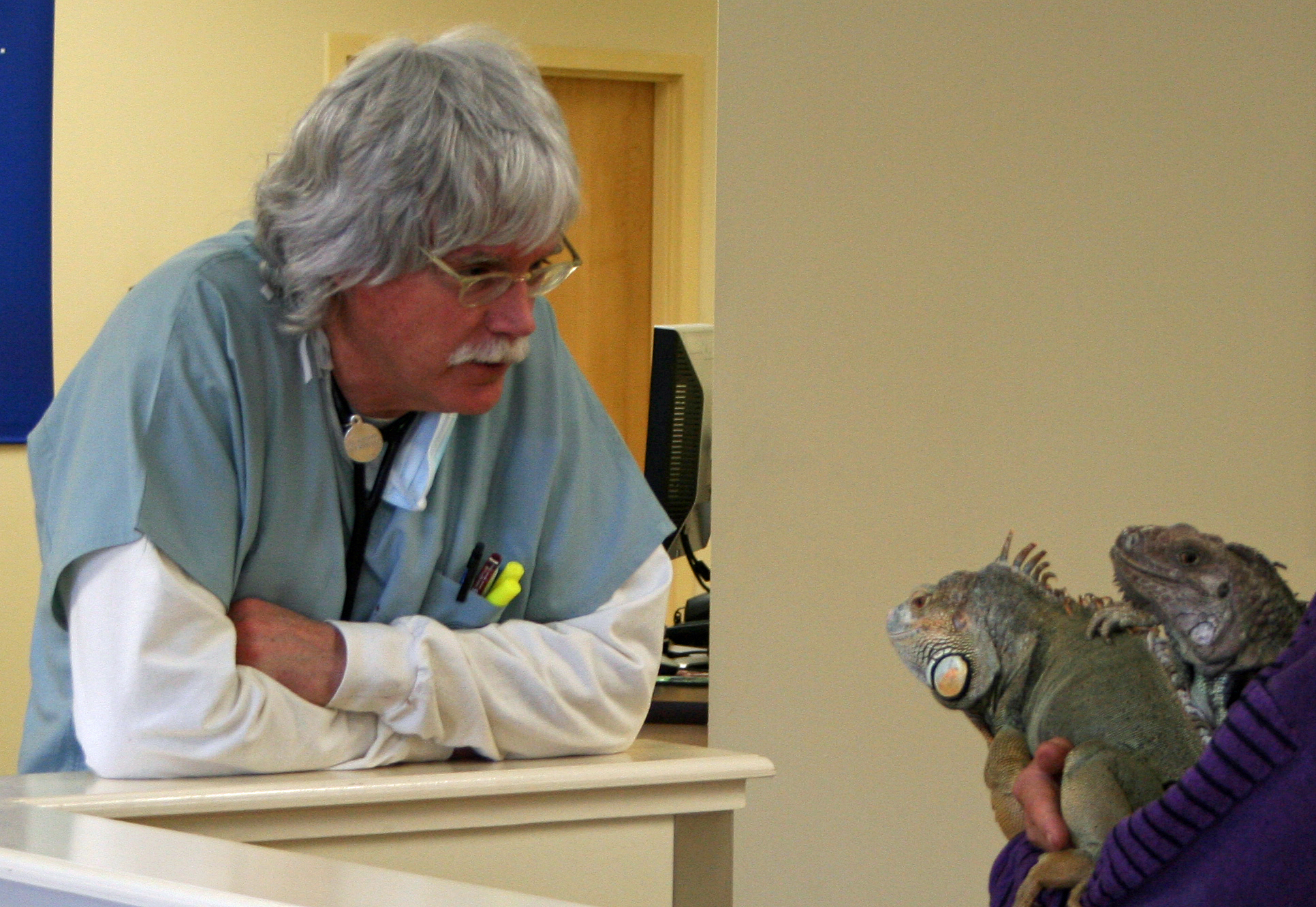
Examining a couple of his patients.

== Past jobs and positions ==
Kevin Fitzgerald was formerly a teacher at the University of Hawaii. On summers off, he worked as security for a wide variety of musical acts, such as Elvis Presley, The Who, Bob Marley, Willie Nelson, George Clinton, and The Rolling Stones. On an episode of Emergency Vets, Fitzgerald noted that he knew it was time to get serious about pursuing a career in veterinary medicine when Keith Richards of the Rolling Stones asked him if he wanted to "still be a bouncer at 50".

Fitzgerald joined the staff of Alameda East, a 24-hour facility equipped to provide emergency care, in 1985. He also once served as president of the Denver Area Veterinary Medical Society while he was on the board of directors of the Rocky Mountain Poison and Drug Center.

== Current jobs and positions ==
Fitzgerald is a veterinarian at Alameda East Veterinary Hospital, where the Animal Planet television series Emergency Vets and its follow-up E-Vet Interns were filmed. For the past 25 years, he has been an assistant professor adjunct at the University of Denver, where he teaches a course called "Perspectives in Veterinary Medicine". He also serves as a veterinary consultant for the Aurora, Colorado police department's K-9 division. He has written chapters in medical texts on subjects such as emergency veterinarian medicine, toxicology, and reptile medicine and surgery.

On August 11, 2007, Fitzgerald was a "Not My Job" guest on NPR's "Wait Wait ... Don't Tell Me". He told stories about Keith Richards ("when Keith Richards suggests you're wasting your life, you gotta listen"), his fear of spiders and then correctly answered all three questions regarding BALCO founder Victor Conte. The segment has been replayed on several of Wait Wait ... Don't Tell Me's "best of" and compilation episodes; as of February 2017, this is the most-repeated guest segment of the show.

After Emergency Vets ceased production in 2002, Fitzgerald occasionally appeared in a set of pet health reminder PSAs on Animal Planet called "Animal Tips With Dr. Fitz". He also appeared in PSAs for the Animal Planet animal welfare project "ROAR" (Reach Out, Act, Respond).

In 2007, Fitzgerald and the rest of the Alameda East team returned to prime-time television in a new Animal Planet series, E-Vet Interns. On the new series, Fitzgerald continually stresses the importance of exposing young vets to experiences with exotic animals such as snakes and other reptiles, as well as showing young vets how to give back to their community by providing services for "working animals" such as police dogs.

== Stalking ==
Vicki Tenney, a West Virginia woman, began stalking Fitzgerald in 1999. She began by writing fan letters and in 2002, relocated to Denver and made death threats against Fitzgerald. By Christmas in 2004, Tenney was calling Fitzgerald daily saying she was going to kill him and had purchased a coffin for him. At a hearing in January 2006, she was deemed unfit to stand trial and ordered into treatment.

On October 27, 2006, Tenney was sentenced to 18 months of probation, obtain mental health treatment, and ordered to stay away from Fitzgerald and Alameda East Veterinary Hospital in a plea bargain in which she pleaded guilty to violating a restraining order. Doctors deemed Tenney more suitable to stand trial since her treatment began, but the prosecutor of the case, stating that she believed the disposition was appropriate, declined to bring Tenney to trial as long as Tenney continues to follow the requirements of her probation.
