= Laurent-Théodore Biett =

Swiss dermatologist

Laurent-Théodore Biett (25 July 1781 – 3 March 1840) was a Swiss-born dermatologist from Schams in the canton of Graubünden. He is chiefly remembered for introducing into France an anatomical methodology of analyzing skin diseases; a system that was first developed by the British dermatologist Robert Willan (1757–1812).

== Biography ==
In 1786 he moved with his family to Clermont-Ferrand. He received his initial medical education at the Hôtel-Dieu de Clermont-Ferrand, relocating to Paris in 1801, where he became a favourite student of Jean-Louis Alibert. When Alibert's work at the Hôpital Saint-Louis was interrupted by royal obligations, Biett filled in for his teacher. From 1813 Biett was a doctor of medicine, later becoming chief medical officer at Hôpital Saint-Louis.

Biett was not known for his published works, however two of his students, Pierre Louis Alphée Cazenave and Henri Édouard Schedel, took assiduous notes of his lectures. In 1828 Cazenave and Schedel published Abregé pratique des maladies de la peau, a work that was a compilation of Biett's teachings and was to become a major work in dermatology. Cazenave is credited for coining the term lupus erythemateaux (lupus erythematosus), derived from Biett's symptomatic descriptions of the disease.

Biett was a member of the Académie royale de Médecine, and in 1830 he was awarded the Légion d'honneur.

== Associated eponym ==
- Biett's collarette: a syphilitic symptom in which the center papule is encircled by a ring of scales.
