= Sculptural composition "Egyptian Pyramid" =

Coordinates: 47°13′03″N 38°55′34″E

- Russian: Скульптурная композиция «Египетская пирамида»
- Interactive map of Sculptural composition "Egyptian Pyramid"
- Location: Taganrog, Rostov Oblast, Russia
- Designer: Dmitry Lyndin
- Material: bronze
- Opening date: September 1, 2008

The sculptural composition "Egyptian Pyramid" (Russian: Скульптурная композиция «Египетская пирамида») is a sculptural composition in Taganrog created by sculptor Dmitry Lyndin based on the story of Anton Chekhov "Kashtanka".

The sculptural composition is made of cast bronze. In the Chekhov story "Kashtanka" there is an episode with a circus number "Egyptian pyramid", an acrobatic pyramid made by pig Havronya Ivanovna, goose Ivan Ivanovich, cat Fyodor Timofeyevich and dog Kashtanka.

150 kg of wax (wax model), 1000 kg of molding mixture, 1000 kg of artistic bronze "Br OCS 555" were used to make the composition. The figures of composition cast in bronze were subjected to engraving, grinding, polishing, and artificial patination.

The total cost of manufacturing, installation and improvement of sculptural composition amounted to 1 061,0 thousand rubles.

The monument was inaugurated on the Day of Knowledge, September 1, 2008.
