= Henri Marie Bouley =

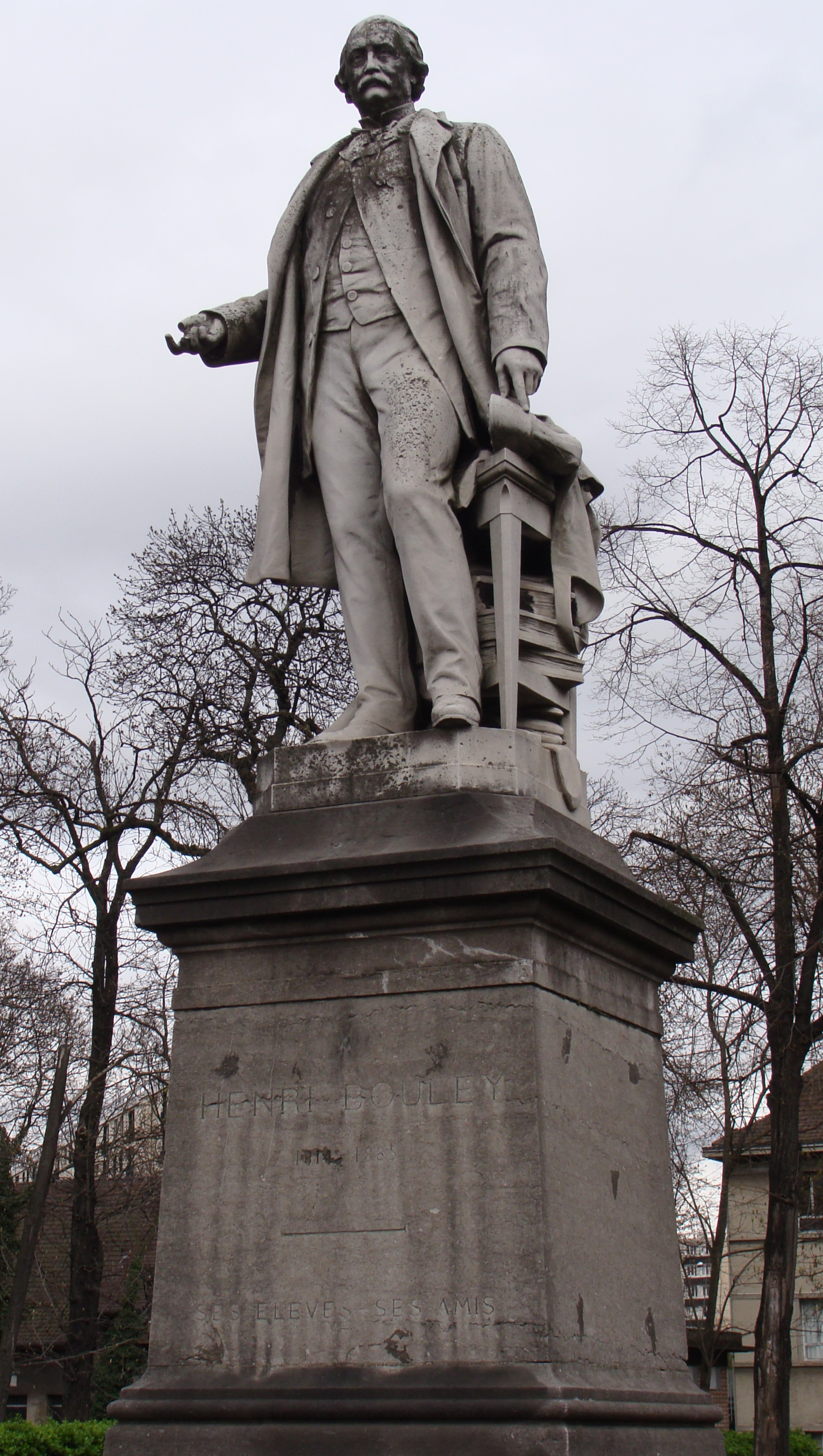
Statue of Henri Bouley by Henri Allouard at the Veterinary School of Alfort

Henri Marie Bouley (17 May 1814 – 2 December 1885) was a pioneering French veterinarian and pathologist. Bouley was professor of surgical pathology at the École nationale vétérinaire d'Alfort (National Veterinary School of Alfort), and in 1885, was elected president of the French Academy of Sciences. He succeeded Claude Bernard at the Muséum national d'histoire naturelle (National Museum of Natural History), where he secured a course in comparative pathology.

== Bibliography ==
- Louis-Georges Neumann : Biographies vétérinaires, avec 42 portraits dessinés par l'auteur 435p., Paris : Asselin et Houzeau, 1896
- Ronald Hubscher : Les maîtres des bêtes. Les vétérinaires dans la société française (XVIIIe-XXe siècle), 449p., ed. Odile Jacob, May 1999, Paris ISBN 2-7381-0710-9
