= Saratov Veterinary Institute =

- Саратовский зооветеринарный институт
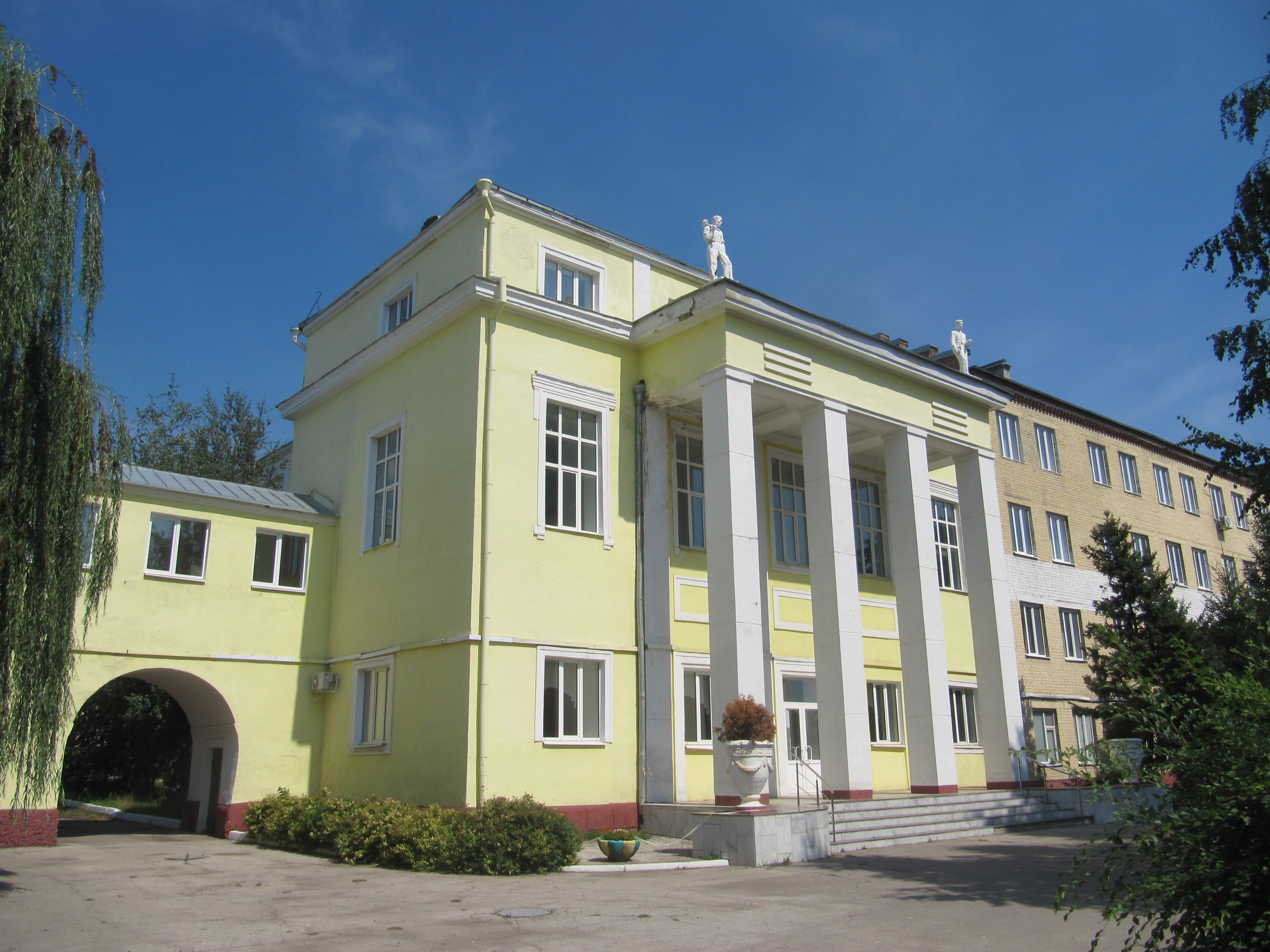
- Established: 1918
- Location: Saratov, Russia
- Language: Russian

The Saratov Zoo Veterinary Institute (Russian: Саратовский зооветеринарный институт) is a higher education institution founded on 15 July 1918 to train livestock specialists and veterinarians. Reorganized on 18 December 1997 by joining the Saratov State Agrarian University.

== History ==
In 1848, the Derpt Veterinary School was opened in Dorpat (since 1893 - Yuryev) to train veterinarians and their assistants. In 1873, the Dorpat Veterinary School was reorganized into the Tartu Veterinary Institute to train veterinarians and masters of veterinary medicine. On 15 July 1918, the Yuryev Veterinary Institute was transferred to the city of Saratov, where the Saratov Veterinary Institute was organized under the guidance of Professor F.K. Karaulov. The first teaching staff of the institute included eleven full-time teachers, including professors: F.K. Karaulov, N.L. Yustov, D.S. Ruzhentsev, L.G. Spassky, Ya.Kh. Negotin and A.V. Sinev, as well as scientists from other higher educational institutions attracted to the institute to give lectures: Aleksandr Bogomolets, N. G. Kolosov, V. V. Chelintsev, V. S. Worms and O. V. Garkavi. In 1919, the institute was transferred to the building of the Saratov State Agrarian University. In 1925, Professor A. R. Evgrafov was appointed rector of the institute. On 14 June 1926, by decision of the Saratov Provincial Executive Committee, the institute was transferred to the building of the former Saratov Theological Seminary. Six classrooms were created in the structure of the institute: pathoanatomical, physiological, agricultural, physical, chemical and mineralogical, the teaching staff consisted of twenty people.

On 3 June 1930, by the Decree of the Council of People's Commissars of the USSR, on the basis of the Saratov Veterinary Institute, the Saratov Zootechnical and Veterinary Institute was established with its subordination to the People's Commissariat of Agriculture of the RSFSR. In the structure of the institute, two faculties were founded: veterinary and zootechnical, and ten general institute departments: surgery, epizootology, physiology, zoohygiene, pathology and normal anatomy, obstetrics, feeding, animal husbandry and the foundations of Marxism–Leninism. From 1932 to 1937, surgical, diagnostic and therapeutic clinics were opened at the institute. Since 1941, during the Great Patriotic War, the main educational building of the institute was converted into a military hospital, the main educational process at the institute took place in its clinics. From 1941 to 1942, an accelerated wartime curriculum was introduced at the institute with a duration of study of three years and five months. Since 1942 military surgeons have been trained by the institute. During the war, the museum of pathological and normal anatomy ceased to exist. From 1941 to 1942 the institute graduated 29 livestock specialists and 118 veterinarians. From 1942 to 1943, 52 specialists were released. From 1943 to 1944, 35 specialists were graduated. In total, from 1941 to 1944, 324 doctors were graduated, of which: 280 veterinarians and 44 livestock specialists. In 1944, the total number of students was 397 [4]. In 1947, a correspondence department was opened at the institute. In 1990, in addition to the existing ones, the faculty of commodity science and the faculty of technology were created. В 1947 году в институте было открыто заочное отделение. В 90 году помимо существующих были созданы факультет товароведения и технологический факультет

In 1994, by the Decree of the Government of the Russian Federation, the Saratov State Zootechnical and Veterinary Institute was renamed the Saratov Academy of Veterinary Medicine and Biotechnology. On 18 December 1997, by Decree of the Government of the Russian Federation No. 1570 and Order of the Ministry of Agriculture and Food of the Russian Federation No. 220, the Saratov Academy of Veterinary Medicine and Biotechnology was reorganized and merged with the Saratov State Agrarian University. The structure of the faculty has seven departments: animal diseases and veterinary and sanitary examination, feeding, zoohygiene and aquaculture, microbiology, biotechnology and chemistry, morphology, animal pathology and biology, food technology and technology for the production and processing of animal products. The teaching staff includes one hundred and twenty teachers, of which thirty have the academic title of professor and the academic degree of doctor of medical sciences, and eighty-two people have the academic degree of candidate of medical sciences. During the existence of the institute, more than 20,000 doctors graduated from it, more than 300 candidates and 50 doctors of science were trained.

== Management ==
- Karaulov, Fedor Vasilyevich (1918-1925)
- Evgrafov, Alexey Romanovich (1925-1930)
- Kosterin, Vasily Evgrafovich (1930-1937)
- Kolesov, Alexander Mikhailovich (1950-1968)

== Notable teachers ==
- Alexander Alexandrovich Bogomolets
- Shvetsov, Anatoly Pavlovich
- Chiguryaeva, Anastasia Andreevna
- Chirov, Pavel Abramovich
- Popov, Nikolai Petrovich

== Famous graduates ==
- Krasnenkov, Mikhail Mikhailovich
- Gorbunov, Ivan Nikiforovich
- Murzagaliev, Khalil
- Zakharov, Viktor Nikolaevich
- Degtyarev, Vladimir Pavlovich - Doctor of Biological Sciences, Professor, Academician of the Russian Academy of Sciences and the Russian Academy of Agricultural Sciences
- Dorozhkin, Vasily Ivanovich - Doctor of Biological Sciences, Professor, Academician of the Russian Academy of Sciences
- Larionov, Sergey Vasilievich - Doctor of Veterinary Sciences, Professor, Corresponding Member of the Russian Academy of Agricultural Sciences and the Russian Academy of Sciences
- Tuchemsky, Lev Ippolitovich - Doctor of Agricultural Sciences, Professor, Corresponding Member of the Russian Academy of Agricultural Sciences and the Russian Academy of Sciences
- Ukbaev, Khisemidulla Yskhakovich - Doctor of Agricultural Sciences, Professor, Academician of the National Academy of Sciences of the Republic of Kazakhstan
- Boldyrev, Vladimir Mikhailovich - Honored Veterinarian of the BASSR, laureate of the State Prize of the USSR
- Poletskov, Vladimir Nikitovich - Chairman of the Kemerovo Regional Executive Committee and Deputy of the Council of the Union of the Supreme Soviet of the USSR

Chub, Mikhail Ilyich

== Literature ==
- Саратовскому зоотехническо-ветеринарному институту 50 лет. 1918—1968 / М-во сел. хоз-ва СССР. - Саратов : Приволж. кн. изд-во, 1968. — 151 с.
- Первые преподаватели Саратовского зооветеринарного института (СЗВИ). К 100-летию пребывания СЗВИ в Саратове / Сборник статей Всероссийской научно-практической конференции // Саратовский государственный аграрный университет имени Н.И. Вавилова, Саратов: 2018. — С.29-32
- Энциклопедия Саратовского края / редкол.: В. И. Вардугин [и др.]. - [Изд. 2-е, перераб.]. - Саратов : Приволжское изд-во, 2011. — 443 с. — ISBN 978-5-91369-077-7
- История ветеринарии / Т. И. Минеева. - Санкт-Петербург; Москва; Изд-во Лань; 2005. — 382 с. — ISBN 5-8114-0627-4

== Sources ==
- "Факультет ветеринарной медицины, пищевых и биотехнологий Саратовского государственного аграрного университета имени Н.И. Вавилова отмечает свое 100-летие". Министерство сельского хозяйства Саратовской области.
- "Институт ветеринарной медицины и биотехнологий". All-Russian Mathematical Portal.
- "Сохраняя традиции - создаём будущее!". МК в Саратове: №39 (1100) 19.09.2018.
- "Зоотехния – как искусство и мастерство…". «Крестьянский двор».
