= Syphilidologie =

- Discipline: Dermatology
- Language: German

Publication details
- History: 1838

Standard abbreviations
- ISO 4: Syphilidologie

Indexing
- OCLC no.: 50363574

Syphilidologie was a medical journal first created in 1838 in Leipzig by Friedrich Jacob Behrend.
