= Vet School Confidential =

Vet School Confidential is a reality TV show that first aired on Animal Planet in 2001. It follows five students from the Michigan State University College of Veterinary Medicine as they go through their clinical rotations tending to a variety of animals. Examples of the topics in episodes include; students doing physical exams of cows, performing open-heart surgery on a puppy, or dehorning a goat.
