= William Wallace (surgeon) =

Irish surgeon

William Wallace (1791–1837), was an Irish surgeon at the Jervis Street Hospital, Dublin, who used potassium iodide to treat syphilis, and experimented on healthy individuals by inoculating them with syphilis to demonstrate it was contagious. In 1818, he founded the Dublin Infirmary for Diseases of the Skin at 20 Moore Street. He wrote A Treatise on the Venereal Disease and Its Varieties (1833).

== Selected publications ==
- Observations on sulphurous fumigations, as a powerful remedy in diseases of the skin and in rheumatic, gouty, and other inveterate diseases / by William Wallace. 1826.
- A treatise on the venereal disease and its varieties. London: Burgess and Hill. 1833.
