= Robert Willan =

English physician and founder of dermatology (1757–1812)

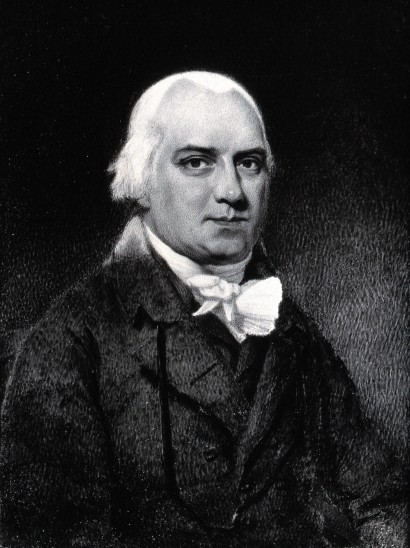
- Portrait of Robert Willan
- Born: 12 November 1757; Sedbergh, Yorkshire, England
- Died: 7 April 1812 (aged 54); Madeira, Portugal
- Education: University of Edinburgh
- Occupations: Physician, dermatologist
- Known for: Founding modern dermatology; classification of skin diseases
- Awards: Fellow of the Royal Society (1809)

Robert Willan FRS (12 November 1757 – 7 April 1812) was an English physician best known for establishing the first systematic classification of skin diseases and is widely regarded as the founder of modern dermatology.

== Early life and education ==
Willan was born in Sedbergh, Yorkshire, and was educated at Sedbergh School before studying medicine at the University of Edinburgh, graduating in 1780. He later moved to London, where he began working in medical dispensaries serving urban populations.

== Career ==
In 1783, Willan became physician at the Carey Street Public Dispensary in London, where he treated large numbers of patients with skin diseases. His clinical work there formed the basis for his later attempts to classify dermatological conditions systematically.

He was elected a Fellow of the Royal Society in 1809.

== Contributions to dermatology ==
Willan is best known for developing a systematic classification of skin diseases based on their morphological appearance. His system divided dermatoses into “orders” defined by lesion type, including papules, scales, rashes, blisters, pustules, vesicles, tubercles, and macules.

This approach was influenced by earlier taxonomic methods in natural history, particularly the work of Carl Linnaeus and Joseph Plenck, but refined into a clinically usable system based on observable lesions rather than theoretical causes.

Willan’s 1808 work On Cutaneous Diseases is considered a foundational text in dermatology and is noted for its structured classification and medical illustrations.

== Legacy ==
Willan’s system formed the basis of later dermatological classification systems, particularly through the work of his student Thomas Bateman, who completed and expanded Willan’s unfinished work after his death.

His morphological approach remains influential in dermatology today, particularly in the description of primary skin lesions used in clinical diagnosis.

== Death ==
Willan died in Madeira in 1812, where he had travelled in hopes of improving his health.

== See also ==
- Thomas Bateman (physician)
- History of dermatology
- Skin lesion
