= List of awards and nominations received by Lupita Nyong'o =

Lupita Nyong'o awards and nominations
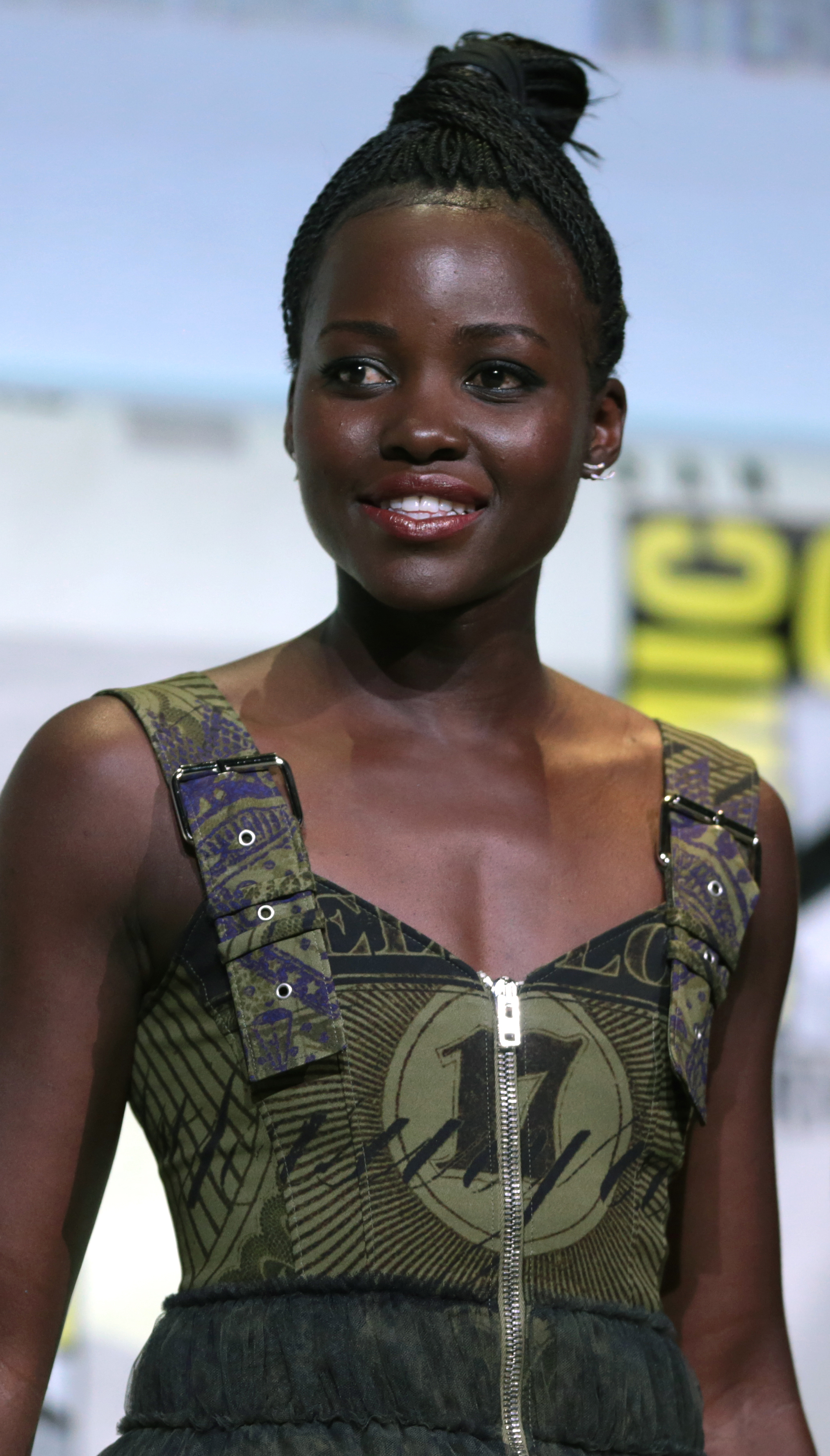
- Nyong'o at the 2016 San Diego Comic-Con
Awards and nominations (Note: Certain award groups do not simply award one winner. They recognize several different recipients, have runners-up, and have third place. Since this is a specific recognition, and is different from losing an award, runner-up mentions are considered wins in this award tally. Awards in certain categories do not have prior nominations, and only winners are announced by the jury. For simplification, and to avoid errors, each award in this list has been presumed to have had a prior nomination.)
Award	Wins	Nominations
Totals
Academy Awards	1	1
Astra Film Awards	1	2
British Academy Film Awards	0	2
Daytime Emmy Awards	1	1
Golden Globe Awards	0	1
Independent Spirit Awards	1	1
NAACP Image Awards	5	10
Primetime Emmy Awards	0	2
Saturn Awards	0	4
Tony Awards	0	1
Wins	67
Nominations	118

The following is a list of awards and nominations received by Kenyan-Mexican actress Lupita Nyong'o. She won her first Academy Award for her feature film debut in 12 Years a Slave (2013), where she became the first Kenyan and Mexican actress to win the award. Nyong'o was also nominated for several awards including a Golden Globe Award for Best Supporting Actress, a BAFTA Award for Best Actress in a Supporting Role and a Screen Actors Guild Awards for Best Supporting Actress, which she won.

Nyong'o made her Broadway debut as a teen orphan in the critically acclaimed play Eclipsed (2015), where she earned a Theatre World Award for Outstanding Broadway or Off-Broadway Debut Performance. In addition, she was nominated for a Tony Award for Best Actress in a Play and a Distinguished Performance Award at the Drama League Award for her performance.

In 2018, Nyong'o co-starred in the superhero film Black Panther, which earned her multiple award nominations, including BET Award for Best Actress, NAACP Image Award for Best Supporting Actress, and a Saturn Award for Best Actress. The following year, she starred and earned nominations for her dual role in the horror film Us (2019), which included a Critics' Choice Movie Award for Best Actress, two MTV Movie Awards, an NAACP Image Award for Best Actress (won), two People's Choice Awards, a Saturn Award for Best Actress, and a Screen Actors Guild Award for Best Actress.

Nyong'o narrated the Discovery Channel's docu-series Serengeti (2019), about wildlife in the Serengeti ecosystem. In 2020, she earned her first Emmy Award nomination for her narration as an Outstanding Narrator, making her the third black woman to be nominated in the category. She was also nominated for an NAACP Image Award for Character Voice-Over Performance.

== Major associations ==
=== Academy Awards ===
The Academy Awards is an annual American awards ceremony hosted by the Academy of Motion Picture Arts and Sciences to recognize excellence in cinematic achievements in the United States film industry.

Year	Category	Nominated work	Result	Ref.
2014	Best Supporting Actress	12 Years a Slave	Won	

=== British Academy Film Awards ===
The British Academy Film Awards are presented in an annual award show hosted by the British Academy of Film and Television Arts.

Year	Category	Nominated work	Result	Ref.
2014	BAFTA Rising Star Award	—	Nominated	
2014	Best Actress in a Supporting Role	12 Years a Slave	Nominated	

=== Emmy Awards ===
The Primetime Emmy Award is an American award bestowed by the Academy of Television Arts & Sciences in recognition of excellence in American primetime television programming. The Daytime Emmy Award is an American award bestowed by the Academy of Television Arts & Sciences in recognition of excellence in American daytime television programming.

Year	Category	Nominated work	Result	Ref.
Primetime Emmy Awards
2020	Outstanding Narrator	Serengeti (For "Destiny")	Nominated	
2022	Outstanding Narrator	Serengeti (For "Intrigue")	Nominated	
Daytime Emmy Awards
2021	Outstanding Limited Performance in a Children’s Program	Bookmarks: Celebrating Black Voices (For "Lupita Nyong'o Reads Sulwe")	Won	

=== Golden Globe Awards ===
The Golden Globe Award is an American accolade bestowed by the members of the HFPA recognizing excellence in film and television, both domestic and foreign.

Year	Category	Nominated work	Result	Ref.
2013	Best Supporting Actress – Motion Picture	12 Years a Slave	Nominated	

=== Independent Spirit Awards ===
The Independent Spirit Awards, founded in 1984, are awards dedicated to independent filmmakers.

Year	Category	Nominated work	Result	Ref.
2014	Best Supporting Female	12 Years a Slave	Won	

=== Screen Actors Guild Awards ===
The Screen Actors Guild Award is an accolade given by the Screen Actors Guild‐American Federation of Television and Radio Artists to recognize outstanding performances in film and primetime television.

Year	Category	Nominated work	Result	Ref.
2014	Outstanding Performance by a Female Actor in a Supporting Role	12 Years a Slave	Won	
2014	Outstanding Performance by a Cast in a Motion Picture	12 Years a Slave	Nominated	
2019	Outstanding Performance by a Cast in a Motion Picture	Black Panther	Won	
2020	Outstanding Performance by a Female Actor in a Leading Role	Us	Nominated	

=== Tony Awards ===
The Antoinette Perry Award for Excellence in Theatre, more commonly known informally as the Tony Award, recognizes achievement in live Broadway theatre.

Year	Category	Nominated work	Result	Ref.
2016	Best Lead Actress in a Play	Eclipsed	Nominated	

== Industry awards ==
=== AACTA Awards ===
The Australian Academy of Cinema and Television Arts Awards, are presented annually by the Australian Academy of Cinema and Television Arts.

Year	Category	Nominated work	Result	Ref.
2014	Best Supporting Actress – International	12 Years a Slave	Nominated	

=== Africa Movie Academy Awards ===
The Africa Movie Academy Awards are presented annually to recognize excellence of professionals in the film industry in the continent of Africa and the diaspora.

Year	Category	Nominated work	Result	Ref.
2017	Best Actress in a Leading Role	Queen of Katwe	Nominated	

=== BET Awards ===
The BET Awards were established in 2001 by the Black Entertainment Television network to celebrate African Americans and other minorities in music, acting, sports, and other fields of entertainment over the past year

Year	Category	Nominated work	Result	Ref.
2014	Best Actress	12 Years a Slave	Won	
2018	Best Actress	Black Panther (Note: Also for Star Wars: The Last Jedi)	Nominated	
2020	Her Award	Melanin (Note: With Ciara, Ester Dean, La La Anthony, & City Girls)	Nominated	

=== Black Reel Awards ===
The Black Reel Awards began in 2000 and were designed to annually recognize and celebrate the achievements of black people in feature, independent and television films.

Year	Category	Nominated work	Result	Ref.
2014	Best Breakthrough Performance	12 Years a Slave	Won	
2014	Outstanding Supporting Actress	12 Years a Slave	Won	
2017	Outstanding Supporting Actress	Queen of Katwe	Nominated	
2017	Outstanding Voice Performance	The Jungle Book	Nominated	
2019	Outstanding Supporting Actress	Black Panther	Nominated	
2020	Outstanding Actress	Us	Won	
2025	Outstanding Voice Performance	The Wild Robot	Won	

=== Critics' Choice Movie Awards ===
The Critics' Choice Movie Awards is an awards show presented annually by the Broadcast Film Critics Association to honor the finest in cinematic achievement.

Year	Category	Nominated work	Result	Ref.
2014	Best Supporting Actress	12 Years a Slave	Won	
2014	Best Acting Ensemble	12 Years a Slave	Nominated	
2019	Best Acting Ensemble	Black Panther	Nominated	
2020	Best Actress	Us	Nominated	

=== Dorian Awards ===
The Dorian Awards are an annual endeavor organized by GALECA: The Society of LGBTQ Entertainment Critics (founded in 2009 as the Gay and Lesbian Entertainment Critics Association).

Year	Category	Nominated work	Result	Ref.
2013	Film Performance of the Year - Actress	12 Years a Slave	Nominated	
2020	Film Performance of the Year - Actress	Us	Nominated	

=== Drama League Awards ===
The Drama League Awards, created in 1935, honor distinguished productions and performances both on Broadway and Off-Broadway, in addition to recognizing exemplary career achievements in theatre, musical theatre, and directing.

Year	Category	Nominated work	Result	Ref.
2016	Distinguished Performance	Eclipsed	Nominated	
2026	Distinguished Performance	Twelfth Night	Pending	

=== Empire Awards ===
The Empire Awards, is an annual British awards ceremony honoring cinematic achievements in the local and global film industry.

Year	Category	Nominated work	Result	Ref.
2014	Best Female Newcomer	12 Years a Slave	Nominated	
2014	Best Supporting Actress	12 Years a Slave	Nominated	

=== Fangoria Chainsaw Awards ===
The Fangoria Chainsaw Awards are an award ceremony focused on horror films and thriller films.

Year	Category	Nominated work	Result	Ref.
2020	Best Actress	Us	Won	

=== Gotham Awards ===
The Gotham Awards are American film awards, presented annually to the makers of independent films at a ceremony in New York City.

Year	Category	Nominated work	Result	Ref.
2013	Breakthrough Actor	12 Years a Slave	Nominated	

=== Hollywood Film Awards ===
The Hollywood Film Awards are an American motion picture award ceremony held annually since 1997, usually in October or November.

Year	Category	Nominated work	Result	Ref.
2013	New Hollywood Award	12 Years a Slave	Won	

=== MTV Africa Music Awards ===
The MTV Africa Music Awards were established in 2008 by MTV Networks Africa (now Viacom International Media Networks Africa) to celebrate the most popular contemporary music in Africa.

Year	Category	Nominated work	Result	Ref.
2014	Personality of the Year	Herself	Won	

=== MTV Movie & TV Awards ===
The MTV Movie & TV Awards is a film and television awards show presented annually on MTV.

Year	Category	Nominated work	Result	Ref.
2014	Best Female Performance	12 Years a Slave	Nominated	
2016	Best Virtual Performance	Star Wars: The Force Awakens	Nominated	
2018	Best On-Screen Team	Black Panther	Nominated	
2019	Best Performance in a Movie	Us	Nominated	
2019	Best Villain	Us	Nominated	

=== NAACP Image Awards ===
An NAACP Image Award is an accolade presented by the American National Association for the Advancement of Colored People to honor outstanding people of color in film, television, music, and literature.

Year	Category	Nominated work	Result	Ref.
2014	Outstanding Supporting Actress in a Motion Picture	12 Years a Slave	Won	
2017	Outstanding Supporting Actress in a Motion Picture	Queen of Katwe	Nominated	
2019	Outstanding Supporting Actress in a Motion Picture	Black Panther	Nominated	
2019	Outstanding Performance by a Cast in a Motion Picture	Black Panther	Won	
2020	Outstanding Actress in a Motion Picture	Us	Won	
2020	Outstanding Ensemble Cast in a Motion Picture	Us	Nominated	
2020	Outstanding Character Voice-Over Performance	Serengeti	Nominated	
2020	Outstanding Literary Work – Children	Sulwe	Won	
2023	Outstanding Supporting Actress in a Motion Picture	Black Panther: Wakanda Forever	Nominated	
2023	Outstanding Ensemble Cast in a Motion Picture	Black Panther: Wakanda Forever	Won	
2025	Outstanding Actress in a Motion Picture	A Quiet Place Day One	Nominated	
2025	Outstanding Character Voice-Over Performance (Motion Picture)	The Wild Robot	Nominated	

=== Nickelodeon Kids' Choice Awards ===
The Nickelodeon Kids' Choice Awards is an annual awards show that airs on the Nickelodeon cable channel that honors the year's biggest television, movie, and music acts, as voted by Nickelodeon viewers.

Year	Category	Nominated work	Result	Ref.
2017	Favorite African Star	Herself	Nominated	
2019	Favorite Movie Actress	Black Panther	Nominated	
2023	Favorite Movie Actress	Black Panther: Wakanda Forever	Nominated	
2025	Favorite Female Voice from an Animated Movie	The Wild Robot	Nominated	

=== NME Awards ===
The NME Awards is an annual music awards show in the United Kingdom, founded by the music magazine, New Musical Express.

Year	Category	Nominated work	Result	Ref.
2020	Best Film Actor	Us	Nominated	

=== Obie Awards ===
The Obie Awards are annual awards that cover Off-Broadway and Off-Off-Broadway productions that are awarded to theatre artists and groups in New York City.

Year	Category	Nominated work	Result	Ref.
2016	Obie Award for Distinguished Performance by an Ensemble	Eclipsed	Won	

=== People's Choice Awards ===
The People's Choice Awards is an American awards show, recognizing people in entertainment, voted online by the general public and fans.

Year	Category	Nominated work	Result	Ref.
2019	Drama Movie Star of the Year	Us	Nominated	
2019	Female Movie Star of the Year	Us	Nominated	

=== Satellite Awards ===
The Satellite Awards are annual awards given by the International Press Academy that are commonly noted in entertainment industry journals and blogs.

Year	Category	Nominated work	Result	Ref.
2013	Best Supporting Actress – Motion Picture	12 Years a Slave	Nominated	

=== Saturn Awards ===
The Saturn Award is an award presented annually by the Academy of Science Fiction, Fantasy and Horror Films to honor the top works mainly in science fiction, fantasy, and horror in film, television, and home video.

Year	Category	Nominated work	Result	Ref.
2016	Best Supporting Actress	Star Wars: The Force Awakens	Nominated	
2018	Best Actress	Black Panther	Nominated	
2019	Best Actress	Us	Nominated	
2025	Best Actress in a Film	A Quiet Place: Day One	Nominated	

=== Screen Nation Film and Television Awards ===
The Screen Nation Film and Television Awards was founded in 2003 as a platform to raise the profile of black British and international film and television talent of African heritage.

Year	Category	Nominated work	Result	Ref.
2014	Favourite Female African Rising Screen Talent	12 Years a Slave	Won	

=== Teen Choice Awards ===
The Teen Choice Awards is an annual awards show that airs on the Fox television network. The awards honor the year's biggest achievements in music, film, sports, television, and fashion voted by viewers aged 13 to 19.

Year	Category	Nominated work	Result	Ref.
2018	Choice Sci-Fi Movie Actress	Black Panther	Nominated	
2018	Choice Liplock	Black Panther	Nominated	
2018	Choice Movie Ship	Black Panther	Nominated	

=== Theatre World Awards ===
The Theatre World Awards is an American honor presented annually to actors and actresses in recognition of an outstanding New York City stage debut performance, either on Broadway or off-Broadway.

Year	Category	Nominated work	Result	Ref.
2016	Outstanding Broadway or Off-Broadway Debut Performance	Eclipsed	Honoree	

== Critic Associations ==
Year	Category	Nominated work	Result	Ref.
African-American Film Critics Association
2013	Best Breakout Performance	12 Years a Slave	Won	
2019	Best Actress	Us	Won	
Alliance of Women Film Journalists
2013	Best Actress in a Supporting Role	12 Years a Slave	Won	
2013	Best Ensemble Cast	12 Years a Slave	Nominated	
2013	Unforgettable Moment Award ("Patsey pleads for soap")	12 Years a Slave	Nominated	
2013	Best Breakthrough Performance	12 Years a Slave	Nominated	
2019	Best Actress	Us	Won	
2019	Most Daring Performance Award	Us	Nominated	
American Black Film Festival
2014	Best Supporting Actress	12 Years a Slave	Won	
2014	Breakout Performance	12 Years a Slave	Nominated	
Astra Film Awards
2024	Best Voice-Over Performance	The Wild Robot	Won	
2024	Best Performance in a Horror or Thriller	A Quiet Place: Day One	Nominated	
Austin Film Critics Association
2013	Best Supporting Actress	12 Years a Slave	Won	
2019	Best Actress	Us	Won	
Australian Film Critics Association
2020	Best Actress	Little Monsters	Nominated	
Boston Society of Film Critics
2013	Best Actress in a Supporting Role	12 Years a Slave	Runner-up	
Broadway.com Audience Choice Awards
2016	Favorite Leading Actress for a Play	Eclipsed	Won	
Chicago Film Critics Association
2013	Best Supporting Actress	12 Years a Slave	Won	
2013	Most Promising Performer	12 Years a Slave	Nominated	
2019	Best Actress	Us	Won	
Dallas–Fort Worth Film Critics Association
2013	Best Supporting Actress	12 Years a Slave	Won	
2019	Best Actress	Us	5th Place	
Detroit Film Critics Society
2013	Best Supporting Actress	12 Years a Slave	Nominated	
2013	Best Ensemble	12 Years a Slave	Nominated	
2019	Best Actress	Us	Nominated	
Dublin Film Critics' Circle
2019	Best Actress	Us	Runner-up	
Florida Film Critics Circle
2013	Best Supporting Actress	12 Years a Slave	Won	
2013	Pauline Kael Breakout Award	12 Years a Slave	Won	
Georgia Film Critics Association
2013	Best Actress in a Supporting Role	12 Years a Slave	Won	
2013	Best Breakthrough Performance	12 Years a Slave	Nominated	
2013	Best Ensemble	12 Years a Slave	Nominated	
2019	Best Actress	Us	Won	
Hamptons International Film Festival
2013	Breakthrough Performer	12 Years a Slave	Won	
Hollywood Critics Association
2019	Best Actress	Us	Won	
Houston Film Critics Society
2013	Best Actress in a Supporting Role	12 Years a Slave	Won	
2019	Best Actress	Us	Nominated	
IndieWire Critics Poll
2013	Best Supporting Performance	12 Years a Slave	Won	
2019	Best Actress	Us	Won	
International Cinephile Society
2014	Best Actress in a Supporting Role	12 Years a Slave	Nominated	
2014	Best Ensemble	12 Years a Slave	Nominated	
2020	Best Actress	Us	Nominated	
London Film Critics' Circle
2013	Supporting Actress of the Year	12 Years a Slave	Won	
2019	Actress of the Year	Us	Nominated	
Los Angeles Film Critics Association
2013	Best Supporting Actress	12 Years a Slave	Won	
2019	Best Actress	Us	Runner-up	
Maui Film Festival
2014	Rainmaker Award	12 Years a Slave	Won	
National Film Awards UK
2017	Best Actress	Queen of Katwe	Nominated	
National Society of Film Critics Awards
2013	Best Supporting Actress	12 Years a Slave	Runner-up	
New York Film Critics Circle
2013	Best Supporting Actress	12 Years a Slave	Runner-up	
2019	Best Actress	Us	Won	
New York Film Critics Online
2013	Best Supporting Actress	12 Years a Slave	Won	
2019	Best Actress	Us	Won	
Online Film Critics Society
2013	Best Supporting Actress	12 Years a Slave	Won	
2019	Best Actress	Us	Won	
Outer Critics Circle Awards
2016	Outstanding Actress in a Play	Eclipsed	Nominated	
Palm Springs International Film Festival
2014	Breakthrough Performance Award	12 Years a Slave	Won	
San Diego Film Critics Society
2013	Best Supporting Actress	12 Years a Slave	Nominated	
2013	Best Performance by an Ensemble	12 Years a Slave	Nominated	
2019	Best Actress	Us	Won	
San Francisco Bay Area Film Critics Circle
2013	Best Supporting Actress	12 Years a Slave	Nominated	
2019	Best Actress	Us	Won	
Santa Barbara International Film Festival
2020	Montecito Award	Us	Won	
Seattle Film Critics Society
2018	Best Ensemble	Black Panther	Nominated	
2019	Best Actress	Us	Won	
2019	Villain of the Year	Us	Nominated	
St. Louis Gateway Film Critics Association
2013	Best Supporting Actress	12 Years a Slave	Won	
Toronto Film Critics Association
2013	Best Supporting Actress	12 Years a Slave	Runner-up	
2019	Best Actress	Us	Won	
Vancouver Film Critics Circle
2013	Best Supporting Actress	12 Years a Slave	Runner-up	
2020	Best Actress	Us	Runner-up	
Village Voice Film Poll
2013	Best Supporting Actress	12 Years a Slave	Won	
Washington D.C. Area Film Critics Association
2013	Best Supporting Actress	12 Years a Slave	Won	
2013	Best Ensemble	12 Years a Slave	Won	
2018	Best Ensemble	Black Panther	Nominated	
2019	Best Actress	Us	Won	
Women Film Critics Circle
2019	Best Actress	Us	Won	
