= Mwaura Isaac Maigua =

Kenyan politician

Sen. Dr. Mwaūra Isaac Maigua, CBS CBS
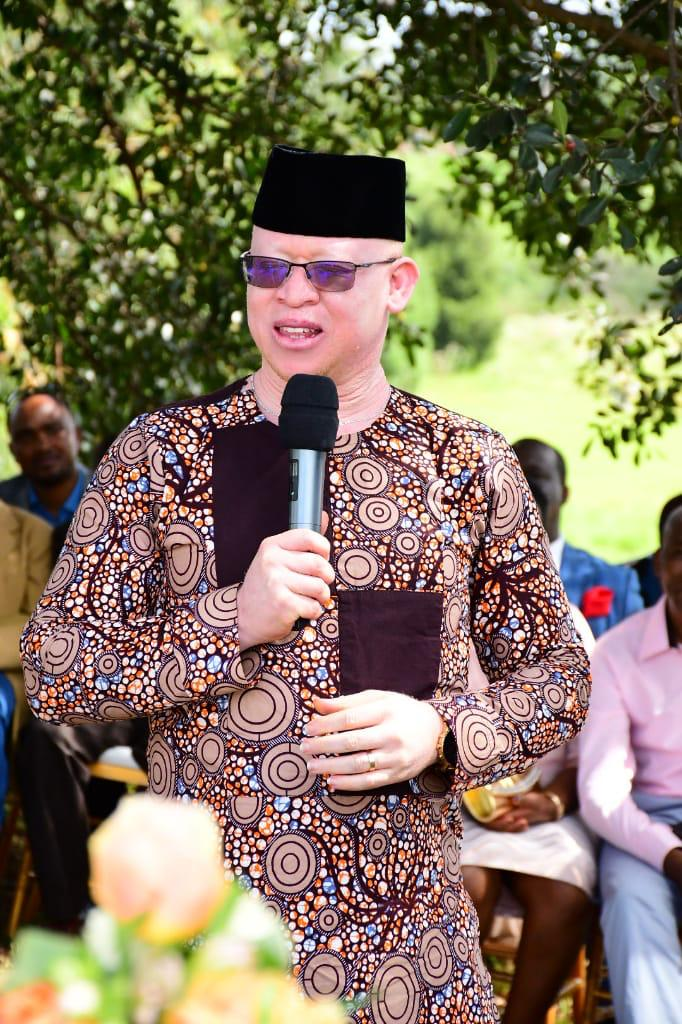
- Senator Mwaura in 2017

Government Spokesman of Kenya
- Incumbent
- Assumed office October 2023

Personal details
- Born: Isaac Maigua Mwaūra; 29 May 1982 (age 44) Gìthūngūri, Kiambu
- Spouse: Nelius Mukami Mwaūra
- Children: Njirū Maigua
- Education: Kenyatta University

Isaac Maigua Mwaūra (born May 29, 1982) is the current Government Spokesman of Kenya, a former Senator as well as a former Cabinet Administrative Secretary (CAS) - Deputy Minister in the Office of Prime Cabinet Secretary. Mwaūra served as a Senator in Kenya's Senate under the Jubilee Party between 2017 and 2022 where he was nominated to represent Persons with Disabilities between 2017 and 2022. He was the third person to occupy that position under the Constitution of Kenya, 2010. He also served as member of Parliament in the National Assembly from 2013 to 2017 after being nominated by the Orange Democratic Movement Party to represents special Interest Groups. He was the first Member of the National Assembly (MP) and Senator in Kenya with albinism. He is a member of the United Democratic Alliance Party (UDA) which is the ruling party under the Kenya Kwanza Administration of President William Samoei Ruto.

Mwaūra served as a senior adviser to former Prime Minister Raila Odinga from 2010 to 2012 on Public Policy on Special Interest Groups.

Mwaūra hails and lives in Kiambu county. He obtained bachelor's degrees in Special Education, French Studies, Japanese, and English (minor) from Kenyatta University. Additionally, he has two master's degrees; Masters of Arts in Development Studies from the Faculty of Business and Economic Sciences of Nelson Mandela University (South Africa); and Masters of Arts in Social and Public Policy Studies from University of Leeds (United Kingdom). Also he has a Diploma in Theology from the Presbyterian University of East Africa (PUEA). Mwaūra also pursued a Diploma in Public Relations Management from Kenya Institute of Management. In 2017, he was awarded with an Honorary Doctorate (Doctor of Humane Letters Honoris Causa) from UGCS - USA.

Mwaūra is a member of the Kenyan society, a debater, social change maker and activist. He is a writer, having authored the book Human Rights, Disability and Development in Kenya (A Discourse). He is also a regular columnists with local dailies. Mwaūra has distinguished himself as an active Member of Parliament. He is articulate in English, French, Swahili and Kikuyu.

In 2016, he was awarded Chief of the Order of the Burning Spear (CBS) by then the President Uhuru Kenyatta, due to his contribution in society. In 2016, he received Activist of the Year Award from the Malaika Tribute Award for his contribution and championing for the rights of persons with disabilities. In 2021, he was recognized by Protection International as one of the seven outstanding human rights defenders in Kenya during the International Human Rights Day. In 2020, he was recognized by the Terres Deshommes International as a Child Rights Champion during the International Day Against the Child Labour. In 2019, Isaac Mwaūra was recognized as the 18th Session of the UN Human Rights Council meeting for his immense contribution to the advancement of the rights of Persons with Albinism in Kenya and beyond. He has also been feted with other awards such as PWD Champion Award in 2018; Wanjikū's Best Representative on Special Interests in Parliament in 2015; Award of Merit by Kenya Society of Plastic, Reconstructive and Aesthetic Surgeons on fighting skin cancer among Persons with Albinism; Lifetime Achievement Award (Annual Disability Rights Awards in 2014); Outstanding Young Alumni Award by Kenyatta University in 2015; Kenyatta University Students Association (KUSA) Alumni Leadership Award in 2018; and Leadership Excellence Award by the Kenya Young Parliamentarians Association (KYPA) in 2014, among other outstanding awards.

He is married to Nelius Mūkami Mwaūra and has one son, Njirū Maigua Mwaūra.

== Early life and education ==
Mwaūra was born in Gìthūngūri, Kiambu County in 1982 and was solely raised by his mother, Grace Njeri at his grandmother's house, after his father disowned him on account of being born with albinism. The deserted family relocated to Mwaūra's maternal grandmother where he and his elder brother Henry grew up. "My father said very nasty things to my mother and declared that in his family they don't get such kids. He even accused her of being unfaithful, and that she had conceived me with somebody of Caucasian or Asian origin." Mwaūra said in 2014 during a media interview.

Although he grew in abundant love and protection from his mother and grandmother, Mwaūra faced prejudice and discrimination from the neighborhood. He was rebuked for his albinism and derogatory comments made about his appearance. Many ignorantly attributed his albinism as having caused by severe burns from hot water, and opined that a total blood transfusion could reverse his disability.

Despite recommendations from the neighbors for Mwaūra to be trained to do menial tasks since he 'couldn't amount to much, anyway', Mwaūra's mother disregarded the suggestion and instead enrolled him to Thika School for the Blind, a special national school that admitted pupils with visual impairment and albinism, so as he could get formal education. This was after the school was recommended to the mother by a lady, Miss Margaret Teresia (MT) Warūinge, her first cousin, and who was a teacher in the school. Isaac joined the kindergarten in Thika School for the Blind at only four and half years old as a boarder. This was a torturous experience for such a young kid as such tender age in a boarding facility. Nevertheless, Mwaūra had 28 classmates drawn from across the country such as Mushenik, Otieno, Abdi, Shematia and many others. This gave him a national outlook. It was also while in kindergarten that Mwaūra become a class monitor at the age of five years, depicting leadership skills at an early age. In fact, at about six years, his maternal grandfather (a brother to his grandfather) would observe that due to Isaac's inquisitive nature, the boy would end up being a politician, something that his grandmother would refute. This was because both the grandmother Mary Wajiku and Isaac's mother used to work as casual labourers at the coffee farm of the local Member of Parliament then, Arthur Kìnyanjui Magūgū. Isaac did very well in class and due to his young age, he was not promoted to kindergarten Two, and therefore spent two years in kindergarten One. He averse that he cannot remember how he came to speak Kiswahili. Nevertheless, at six and half years he joined Standard One at Thika Primary School for the Blind. During his primary school years, he distinguished himself in athletics, poetry, solo verse, and was also a member of the Junior Choir as a soprano, Boy's Choir as a Tenor and also Mixed Choir. He also did well in Drama and won several awards. Interestingly, while in Standard Seven, he became the house captain for Kenyatta Sports House. Also, he was the Christian Union (CU) leader and a Sunday School teacher. While in Standard Eight, the teachers were of opinion he should be the Head Boy; However, it was opined that since he was a higher performer in class, he should be given double prefectship. He thus ended up being both a class prefect and a prefect of the general assembly. In that same year, Isaac emerged the top pupil in the Kenya Certificate of Primary Education (KCPE) in his school in 1996, and also the best in Kiswahili Public Speaking nationally.

He won a slot in Starehe Boys' Centre, a prestigious and the top-performing school in Nairobi, but he was discriminated and denied admission. Mwaūra proceeded to Thika High School for the Blind which he joined in 1997. While at high school, Mwaūra became the school's head boy, an opportunity that enhanced his leadership skills.

After completing his Kenya Certificate of Secondary Education in 2000, Mwaūra joined Kenyatta University in 2002 for a bachelor's degree in Special Education, French Studies and Japanese and completed in 2006. He further pursued and completed a Post-graduate diploma in Public Relations Management in Kenya Institute of Management and a Diploma in Theology in Presbyterian University of East Africa. Between 2010 and 2012, Mwaūra enrolled and graduated with two master's degree: Master's Degree in Social and Public Policy as a Ford Scholar from University of Leeds in United Kingdom and Masters in Arts in Development Studies from Nelson Mandela Metropolitan University in South Africa. In 2016, Mwaūra was conferred with an honorary Doctor of Philosophy in Humanities (Honoris Causa) from UGCI- USA for his immeasurable contribution in serving the marginalized and minorities in Kenya.

== Career and achievements ==
=== Working for Disabled Persons Organizations and civil societies ===
Mwaūra has worked in different organizations, both nationally and internationally. In 2004, while still a university student and aged 22 years, Mwaūra was appointed as a board director to the National Council for the Persons with Disabilities, making him the first youngest board member in Kenya. After graduating from Kenyatta University in 2006, Mwaūra worked as a Regional Programme Coordinator (Gender and Youth Development) with African Union of the Blind as well as a Programme Officer and Programme Manager with United Disabled People of Kenya and Kenya Society for the Blind respectively. He then joined National Council for Persons with Disabilities (NCPWD) as the Head of Communications and Public Relations before rising to the position of deputy director of Programmes in the same state agency. He left the council in 2007 and joined Uraia Trust Civic Education Programme as a programme Officer in charge of the National Civic Education Programme. Mwaūra joined Voluntary Services Overseas and worked as a Programme Development Advisor on Human Rights Based Approach in Papua New Guinea before jetting back to Kenya to work as a Senior Adviser on Special Interest Groups to the former Prime Minister of Kenya Raila Odinga.

=== His role as a student leader ===
Mwaūra was an activist as early as a freshman at Kenyatta University when he organized a strike against a Non-governmental organization that was exploiting visually impaired students at the university. Subsequently, he and others successfully lobbied the Joint Admission Board of Kenya to admit students with special needs who had met the minimum required grade for university placement. While still a freshman at Kenyatta University, Mwaūra was elected as a student leader and joined hands with other leaders including the current Homa Bay Women Representative Gladys Wanga to oust the then Vice-Chancellor Professor George Eshiwani out of office for he was serving an illegal term. During his tenure as a student leader, Mwaūra is credited for coordinating the review of students' union constitution, transforming it from an archaic one to a more vibrant and inclusive document.

=== Albinism Society of Kenya ===
In 2006, Mwaūra and other persons with albinism in Kenya founded Albinism Society of Kenya (ASK), a national organization that brings together persons with albinism in Kenya and whose mission is to create awareness on the rights of persons with albinism, their social inclusion, empowerment and equity to socio-economic opportunities. Mwaūra articulated the objective of ASK: "We wanted to share and celebrate our differences and uniqueness as persons with albinism and lobby the government to fund the national development fund for persons with albinism." Mwaūra is the National Coordinator and the Chairman of Albinism Society of Kenya, and through his stewardship, the organization has made significant milestones in rescuing persons with albinism from ritual killings as well as creating job opportunities and economic empowerment for persons with albinism in Kenya. Additionally, the organization has been involved in policy and legislative advocacy, albinism awareness, eye-care and sunscreen programme, education support, counselling programme and cancer treatment intervention for persons with albinism . Through ASK, persons with albinism in Kenya are provided with free sunscreen lotions, prescription glasses and protective clothing in order to shield them from harmful solar radiation. Also to note, more than 30 hospitals in Kenya have been equipped with cryotherapy equipment in order to assist in mitigation of skin cancer, and a special fund has been set aside to meet medical expenses of skin patients with cancer with albinism. Other key achievements ASK is proud of is the appointment of Mūmbi Ngūgi, a woman with albinism, as the Judge of High Court in Kenya and emergence of Goldalyn Kakuya, a girl with albinism, as the best student in the Kenya Certificate of Primary Education in Kenya in 2017 after scoring 455 marks out of 500. Mwaūra has mentored young persons with albinism, including Martin Pepela Wanyonyi, an elected Member of County Assembly (MCA) for Ndivisi Ward in Bungoma county, and Timothy Aseke who is a nominated MCA in Kakamega county.

=== Campaigns against killings of persons with albinism ===
Mwaūra has led sustained campaigns against stigmatization, discrimination, violence and persecution of persons with albinism in Kenya and East Africa. Mwaūra attributes this plight facing persons with albinism to ignorance, myths and superstitions surrounding albinism. Fallacies and misconceived ideas about promise of wealth, health and success have led to kidnapping, trafficking and brutal murder of innocent men, women and children. "The threat to persons with albinism in Kenya, and East Africa is very real," said Mwaūra in 2015 after rescuing Robinson Mukwana, a young male Kenyan with albinism who had been lured to Tanzania on the promise of a job only to be presented to willing buyers. Mwaūra, who adopted and educates two young children with albinism - Bianca Chacha and Gabriel Kìnyanjui - who had been abducted for ritual killings in 2016 but salvaged, appealed to the East Africa Community. "The heads of state from East Africa should come up with a policy statement on the plight of persons with albinism in the region which has reached alarming levels." Mwaūra says that persons with albinism continue to face threats of their lives. Over 600 persons with albinism have been ritually killed in Africa, with Tanzania leading with 76 reported deaths. In August 2019, a teenage boy with albinism was killed and his body mutilated in Burundi, while in South Africa, a 40-year old teacher in August 2019 admitted guilt to kidnapping and killing a 13-year-old girl with albinism, Gabisile Shabane, for ritual purposes. Mwaūra has associated these killings to election cycles or drought and famine in Africa. Mwaūra, in a press conference in Nairobi on 24 August 2019 apportioned blame to heads of state in Africa for their passivity and failure in safeguarding rights and freedoms of persons with albinism. Mwaūra asked, "How comes that Africa, which suffered from many years of slavery, is the same that is leading in the killings of Persons with Albinism and discrimination based on skin colour?"

=== Mr and Miss Albinism East Africa pageantry ===
In 2018, Mwaūra through ASK, organized the first ever Mr and Miss Albinism East Africa pageantry in Nairobi with its theme 'Beauty Beyond the Skin'. The contest which aimed at showcasing talents of youth with albinism and to combat stigma and discrimination, brought together 30 contestants drawn form Kenya, Uganda and Tanzania.

=== Mwaūra's parliamentary achievements ===
At parliament level where he is a Senator, Mwaūra has successfully championed for the increase in budget allocation to National Council for Persons with Disabilities, as well as inclusion of youth with disabilities to the National Youth Service. Besides advocating for persons with disabilities to be appointed to various constitutional commissions and government agencies, Mwaūra has ensured an establishment of an isolated budget to cater for free sunscreen lotions skin cancer treatment and eye-care services for persons with albinism. Mwaūra is the pioneer and the founding chair of Kenya Disability Parliamentary Association (KEDIPA), a caucus of Members of Parliament with disabilities in Kenya. Furthermore, Mwaūra in 2018 petitioned Central Bank of Kenya to ensure the new currency is accessible to persons with visual impairments, which was adopted and implemented. Also, Mwaūra successfully lobbied and pushed amendments to the law to have persons with albinism captured in the 2019 Census in Kenya as well as enumeration of intersex persons.

=== Awards and honours ===
In 2016, Mwaūra was honoured with the First Class: Chief of the Burning Spear (CBS) by Kenya's President Uhuru Kenyatta for his immense disability advocacy and parliamentary achievement. Similarly, in 2019, Mwaūra was feted during the United Nations' 40th Human Rights Council Convention in Geneva, Switzerland for his efforts in fighting for the rights of persons with albinism in Kenya.

== In My Genes ==
Mwaūra featured in 'In My Genes,' a Kenyan 2009 documentary film that was directed, written, produced and edited by the award-winning actress Lupita Nyong'o in her directing debut. The documentary, where Mwaūra acted as an aspiring politician (a screen dream that he has fulfilled), highlights the plight of persons with albinism. Mwaūra had met Lupita in 2006, and through this encounter, she introduced him to her father, Professor Peter Anyang' Nyong'o, the governor of Kisumu County, who later became his political mentor and the first patron of Albinism Society of Kenya.

== Albinism as a Disability and Clamour for Identity ==
Mwaūra was born with Albinism, a genetic condition that causes the skin, hair and eyes to have little or no melanin pigment. Albinism is also associated with vision problems, and apparent lack of pigmentation makes persons with albinism susceptible to sunburn and skin cancers. Albinism is non-contagious condition that results from biological inheritance of genetically recessive alleles (genes) from both parents and it is characterized by the absence of tyrosinase, an enzyme involved in the production of melanin. Albinism is present within all ethnic groups and populations worldwide, but prevalence rates are particularly high in Africa. Persons with albinism often face social and cultural challenges (including threats), as the condition is often a source of ridicule, discrimination, or even fear and violence. In most African states, persons with albinism are socially stigmatized and less likely to complete schooling, find employment, and find partners. The majority of people with albinism in East Africa live in marginalized social conditions and in a state of economic vulnerability because, apart from having a different physical appearance and having visual impairments, they cannot actively take part in agricultural work due to their sensitivity to the sun, and this effectively excludes them from engaging in the major productive activity in most rural areas. In African countries such as Tanzania and Burundi, there has been unprecedented rise in witchcraft-related killings of people with albinism in recent years, because their bodies are used in portions sold by witch doctors. Another harmful and false belief is that having sexual intercourse with women with albinism can cure a man of HIV. This has led to rapes and subsequent HIV infection.

Mwaūra points prejudice and superstition about albinism as the most prevalent challenge that persons with albinism experience: "You find people don't want to shake your hand – they think albinism is contagious," he said. "and people don't realize when they are doing it, but I can notice. They shake your hand, then they kind of try to wipe it off."

Mwaūra also observes that persons with albinism in Africa lack a true identity as 'they are neither black nor white enough.' Mwaūra said in 2019, "We continue to suffer from 'in betweenness' - white but not white enough, black but not black enough, disabled but not disabled enough." Derogatory labels such as zeruzeru (meaning ghost), ngūrūwe (pig) and dili (which literally means 'deal', and refers to the trade of the body parts of people with albinism on the black market) are used to refer to persons with albinism in East Africa while among the Yoruba and Hausa of Nigeria they are referred to as Afin or eni-orisa (one who belongs to the deity) and Bature-Ntuda, meaning fake white person respectively. Organisations such as Albinism Society of Kenya (ASK) have been established to create awareness about albinism and to fight for all forms of discrimination and persecution targeting persons with albinism. A 2009 Kenyan documentary, In My Genes, directed and produced by Lupita Nyong'o, communicates strongly the plight of persons with albinism.

Though the definition of albinism as a disability in Kenya is within the implicit scope of 'visual and physical impairment...' (Persons with Disabilities Act, 2003), Mwaūra in his capacity as a Member of Parliament (MP) has come up with an amendment to the Act (The Persons with Disabilities Bill, 2019) to secure a distinct and explicit identity of albinism as disability in the law.

Mwaūra in 2014 stated that persons with albinism in Kenya used the ambiguities in law to fight for recognition and their rights as citizens and pointed that the state ought to recognize threats to their lives as an infringement of their rights and grant them protection. Although Mwaūra and Albinism Society of Kenya have successfully lobbied for a state-funded national sunscreen distribution programme for all registered persons with albinism in Kenya, the programme's current success and future sustenance seems dependent on the presentation of albinism as a disability, both in physiological as well as legal terms. Pushing for the political recognition of people with albinism, both as individuals with a disability and at the same time as persons who should be fully included in society (through inclusive education and equal job market opportunities), is one of the positions that Mwaūra and organizations such as Albinism Society of Kenya are carrying forward.

Forums such as International Albinism Awareness Day and Mr and Miss Albinism East Africa pageantry have strengthened the group identity of persons with albinism. Also, United Nations has ensured inclusion of albinism agenda in their human rights framework by appointing Ms. Ikponwosa Ero, a woman with albinism, as the first Independent Expert on the enjoyment of human rights by persons with albinism. The mandate of this office includes raising awareness on the rights of persons with albinism and to combat stereotypes, prejudices and harmful traditional practices and beliefs that hinder their enjoyment of human rights and participation in society on equal basis with others, among other functions. In 2019, Mwaūra led a team of Africans with Albinism to the Africa Union's Council of Ministers in Addis Ababa, Ethiopia, where Africa Union Action Plan on Albinism was adopted and a position of a Special Envoy on Albinism established.

In addition, political representation, including nomination of Mwaūra as a Senator representing Persons with Disabilities in the Parliament has offered persons with albinism an enormous leverage to vouch for a distinct identity in law and in the society.

Finally, availability of data is seen as important approach to strengthening identity of persons with albinism. Many countries in Africa are yet to have official data on persons with albinism. Only in Malawi in 2018 that enumerated and published figures of persons with albinism at 134,000 against a previously estimated figure of 17,000. This case in Malawi indicates there could be a higher prevalence of persons with albinism globally and more so in Africa. Albinism Society of Kenya estimates a figure of between 10,000 and 30,000 persons with albinism in Kenya, but these figures are unverifiable until census with enumeration of persons with albinism is conducted. In his capacity as a Senator for Persons with Albinism, Mwaūra has pushed for the inclusion of persons with albinism in 2019 Kenya Census.

== Political career ==
=== Early political career ===
Mwaūra's political career commenced in Kenyatta University where he was elected as a student leader in 2002 when he was a freshman. Through this position, he joined hands with other elected student leaders and lecturers to lobby the President Mwai Kibaki's Narc government to grant amnesty and readmit university students who had been expelled during the President Daniel arap Moi's regime. Subsequently, he and other leaders organized a major strike that ousted the Vice-Chancellor Professor George Eshiwani who was serving an illegal term at Kenyatta University.

=== Mwaūra as a Special Adviser and a Nominated Member of Parliament ===
After completing his undergraduate course at Kenyatta University, Mwaūra joined Orange Democratic Movement (ODM) party as a member in 2006 and rose ranks to become the Secretary of Disability Affairs. During 2007 Kenya's General election, Mwaūra was instrumental in mobilizing voters with disabilities and campaigning for the ODM presidential candidate Raila Odinga. After the 2007-2008 Kenyan crisis that resulted in the formation of Government of National Unity with Mwai Kibaki as a President and Raila Odinga as a Prime Minister, Mwaūra was appointed as a Senior Adviser on Special Interest Groups in the Prime Minister's office and served from 2010 to 2012.

In 2013, Mwaura was nominated by Orange Democratic Movement as a Member of Parliament (MP) in the Kenya's National Assembly to represent Special Interest Groups and he made history as the first Member of Parliament with albinism in Kenya.

=== 2014 Men-in-Black incident ===
However, Mwaura courted attention and controversy in February 2014 during the Orange Democratic Movement party National Delegates Convention in Kasarani Gymnasium in Nairobi during the election of party officials. The voting was proceeding on peacefully until when Mwaura sprang to a table to protest against omission of his name from ballot papers. Chaos erupted and an ambush of mafia-like men in black suits, infamously referred as 'men-in-black', stormed the gymnasium and destroyed ballot papers and boxes. Delegates scampered out of the hall and the voting ended abruptly.

=== Participation as an aspirant for Rūirū Constituency and alleged assassination attempt ===
In 2016, Mwaūra ditched Orange Democratic Movement party and joined Jubilee Party. In April 2017, he participated in Jubilee Party primaries as a candidate for Ruiru Constituency Parliamentary seat where he was politically nicknamed as 'Mūthūngū wa Rūirū' or the white man from Rūirū, but did not secure the party nomination. Mwaūra termed primaries as 'not credible' as the party primaries across the country were marred with disorganization, rigging, voter bribery, violence and chaos. Two days before the primaries, Mwaūra and his political competitor Simon King'ara had been involved in altercation when Mwaūra went to stop demolition of a motor bike shade he had constructed. Chaos ensued and gun shots rang in the air, leaving Mwaūra with an injury on his ear. Mwaūra immediately reported it as an assassination attempt and that a bullet had grazed his ear. Nevertheless, Mwaūra conceded defeat, stating that his political debut had 'helped fight stigma and discrimination, break glass ceiling, push the awareness and inclusion agenda forward, and inspire many other people in Kenya and beyond to stand up and be counted."

=== Mwaūra's nomination as a Senator to represents Persons with Disabilities ===
Mwaūra thereafter joined Uhuru Kenyatta's presidential campaign team as one of the chief campaigners and a strategist. He was nominated as a Senator by Jubilee Party in 2017 to represent Persons with Disabilities in the Senate.

=== Harassment and discrimination by Secret Service agents in New York in September 2019 ===
On a Facebook post, Mwaūra reported about being harassed and discriminated by virtue of his albinism by the Secret Service agents during a UN General Assembly forum in New York in September, 2019. "I get into the building and check in at the security. I do the usual stuff of emptying my pockets, then I go through the machine and they do a body search. Then I'm told to step aside and I am kept waiting for over thirty minutes. The Secret Service agents ask for my ID and by this time, they have picked my entry card." Mwaūra was informed by the Secret Service that they looking for someone who fitted his description and who was walking around with a screwdriver. Mwaūra wondered, 'In the US, people are allowed to own and carry guns, and here we are talking about a screwdriver?' Mwaūra was again to suffer more humiliation in the same event as he was initially denied access to meet President Uhuru Kenyatta and other colleagues at Hotel Latte. 'The Secret Service takes my card again while others start taking photos of me secretly with their phones...' Even with Mwaūra's colleagues explaining that Mwaūra was a senator from Kenya, the Secret Service still followed him into the lift while looking at him suspiciously. Mwaūra then suffered the same treatment as he was denied access to his hotel room despite providing his UN accreditation. Mwaūra said he could not endure the harassment any further and reminded a secret service agent he was 'a person of colour' and a senator from Kenya when he inquired if Mwaūra was a US senator. Later, US Ambassador to Kenya Kyle McCarter offered apologies to Mwaūra for the incidences.

=== Jubilee replaces Mwaura from Nominated Senate Position ===
On 7 May 2021, the speaker of the Senate Kenneth Lusaka declared Mwaūra's senatorial position vacant after an order from the Jubilee Party. Mwaūra was accused of dealing with other parties other than the Jubilee Party that sponsored him to parliament.
