= Liesl Tommy =

South African-American director

- Born: Cape Town
- Citizenship: South Africa, United States
- Occupations: Theatrical director, Actor, Film director, Director

Liesl Tommy (/ˈliːsəl/) is a South African-American director. Primarily known for her stage work, Tommy became the first woman of color to be nominated for the Tony Award for Best Direction of a Play, for directing the Broadway production of Danai Gurira's Eclipsed (2017). She also guest directed The Walking Dead episode "Chokepoint". She made her feature film directorial debut with the biopic Respect, based on the life of singer Aretha Franklin, starring Jennifer Hudson and released in August 2021.

== Early life ==
Tommy was born in Cape Town, South Africa during apartheid and experienced racial segregation as a non-white citizen. The family lived in the Factreton township. Her father was a high-school teacher and politically active against the apartheid regime. In 1985, when the South African government declared a state of emergency, Tommy's family emigrated to the USA where her father had studied Urban Planning at MIT on a Fulbright scholarship in the 1970s. They moved to Boston when Tommy was 15 years old. She attended Newton North High School where she was one of the few black students. Tommy stated that while in high school, she found a common language and purpose through theatre and made that her main focus.

After graduation, Tommy studied acting with Clare Davidson in London. After she returned to Boston, she worked as a pre-school teacher at Project AFRIC (Advancement for Families Rich in Children), a program working with at-risk families in the Roxbury area of Boston.

== Career ==
Tommy has directed theatre all over the United States, including Center Stage (Baltimore, Maryland), Dallas Theater Center (Dallas, Texas), California Shakespeare Theater (San Francisco, California), Sundance East Africa, Berkeley Repertory Theatre (Berkeley, California), and La Jolla Playhouse (La Jolla, California).

She is known for "re-envisioning" classic plays by creating retellings drawn from her own personal experiences and stories in life. Tommy's aesthetic is physical and visceral and she is interested in portraying the violence of being a human on stage through physical violence and/or violent exchanges.

Tommy's training as an actor has influenced her directorial style, particularly the way that she runs her rehearsals. She finds textual analysis and table work important during the rehearsal process and refrains from putting the play on its feet until she knows the actors have a sense of their characters. She also tries to give the actors the chance to drive the piece so that the audience has a chance to see people being free onstage. Tommy explained her directing philosophy: "My job as a director is to drag that story and drag that audience along for a ride they'll never forget. I don't care about having a signature. I just care about how to make the story as rock and roll as possible and as thrilling as possible. I do have a strong point of view, and there are certain things I explore over and over again in my shows, because there are things I'm working through as an artist."

Tommy has made it a mission of hers to advocate for a more diverse theatre experience in her shows. Her 2012 production of Hamlet at California Shakespeare Theatre featured numerous African-American actors, including the title roles of Hamlet and Ophelia. She has directed plays by celebrated playwrights such as August Wilson's The Piano Lesson at Yale Repertory Theatre in 2011 and Ruined by Lynn Nottage at Berkeley Repertory Theatre in 2011.

One of her remake of a classical production was a version of Les Misérables at Dallas Theater Center she directed in 2014. This production included a racially diverse cast that challenged typical casting types and explored themes of African political demonstrations and "social justice". She had never seen a production of Les Misérables before she directed it, but she did read the book when she was a young girl and had a mission to tell a story of student uprisings. Growing up in South Africa she was surrounded by political and social uprising and she thought it would be beneficial to bring her own experiences into the production.

Tommy believes that theatre should be meaningful and "to change you". Her resume encompasses a wide variety of plays that put this philosophy into action. One of her latest productions, Eclipsed, written by Danai Gurira tells the story of five Liberian women trying to survive toward the end of the Second Liberian War. This production starred Lupita Nyong'o and became the first-ever all-female-cast play written and directed by a female to premiere on Broadway. Before its move to New York, Tommy faced criticism that Eclipsed was too similar to Ruined by Lynn Nottage. When Ms. Nottage saw the play she agreed that there were similarities, but argued that as a whole it was a completely different story about different women and completely different circumstances. Tommy received a Tony Award nomination for directing for Eclipsed, making her the first African-American female director to have received a best directing nomination for a play at the Tony Awards.

Her directing credits include a theatrical version of the animated Disney film Frozen at the Hyperion at Disneyland in Anaheim, California. She directed Kid Victory, a new musical produced Off-Broadway at the Vineyard Theatre in 2017. Tommy was named early on to directing the world premiere of Pass Over by Antoinette Nwandu at the Steppenwolf Theatre Company, however, at its premiere Danya Taymor was listed as director.

In March 2018, Tommy was hired to direct Born a Crime, the film adaption of the autobiography of the same name by Trevor Noah. Liesl directed the Aretha Franklin biopic Respect with Jennifer Hudson portraying Franklin.

== Awards and nominations ==
- 2014: Obie Award, Direction for Appropriate, Winner
- 2016: Lucille Lortel Award, Outstanding Director for Eclipsed, Winner
- 2016: Tony Award, Best Direction of a Play for Eclipsed, nominee
