= East River (film) =

- Directed by: Marc Grey
- Written by: Marc Grey
- Starring: Lupita Nyong'o; Tommaso Spinelli
- Cinematography: Kamil Plocki
- Edited by: Thomas Lindsay
- Music by: Anthony Mascorro
- Production company: Kozak Films
- Release date: 2008
- Running time: 17 minutes
- Country: United States

East River is a 2008 short film written and directed by Marc Grey, notable for being the onscreen debut of Lupita Nyong'o.

== Plot ==
This short film, which has no dialogue, follows a wanderer (played by Tommaso Spinelli), newly arrived in New York City, as he walks and cycles around Brooklyn. He eventually meets a photographer (played by Lupita Nyong'o) in Red Hook with whom he appears to start a relationship. The director, Marc Grey, describes the film as being "about the relationship between physical and emotional space."

== Reception ==
Writing for Film School Rejects, critic Christopher Campbell described confusion around the romance as "more mystifying than frustrating" and went on to say "the plot is not as important as the semi city symphony that arises out of the man’s wandering." The Huffington Post described the film as being "rife with sunshine-drenched shots of Brooklyn bike-riding and gray-skied self-reflection."

== Cast ==
- Lupita Nyong'o
- Tommaso Spinelli

== Awards ==
- 2009 Strasbourg International Film Festival - Winner Best Camera/Cinematography
- 2009 Indie Spirit Film Festival - Official Selection
- 2009 Newfilmmakers Film Festival - Official Selection
- 2010 CineRail Paris Film Festival - Official Selection
- 2010 Hollyshorts Film Festival - Official Selection
