= Marley Dias =

African-American activist and feminist

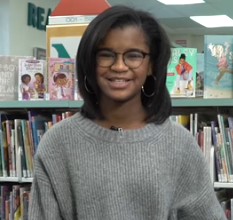
- Dias in 2019
- Born: Philadelphia, Pennsylvania, U.S.
- Occupations: Activist, writer

Marley Dias is an American activist and writer. While Dias was in 6th grade, in November 2015, she launched a campaign called #1000BlackGirlBooks to collect 1,000 books with black female protagonists to donate for black girls at other schools in the U.S.

== Life and career ==
Dias, named after reggae singer Bob Marley, is of Jamaican and Cape Verdean descent. She was born in Philadelphia and grew up in West Orange, New Jersey. Her mother, Janice Johnson Dias, is co-founder of the GrassROOTS Community Foundation.

She is currently attending Harvard University.

When Dias was age 11, she complained to her mother that all of her mandatory readings were books about white boys and dogs. She said, "There wasn't really any freedom for me to read what I wanted." After speaking with her mother, Dias decided to start a book drive, #1000BlackGirlBooks, to bring more attention to literature featuring black female protagonists, with the goal to collect 1,000 books to donate for black girls to other schools. The book drive focuses specifically on books in which black girls are the main characters, not minor or background characters. Within a few months, more than 9,000 books were collected. Many of these books have been sent to a children's book drive in Jamaica. The campaign also called public attention to the lack of diversity in children's literature. Dias attended West Orange High School in West Orange, New Jersey, graduating in 2022.

== Other work ==
Dias released a book, Marley Dias Gets It Done: And So Can You!, under Scholastic in the spring of 2018.

Dias appeared on The Nightly Show with Larry Wilmore and as co-host of the Girls Can Do program.

She interviewed people like Misty Copeland, Ava DuVernay, and Hillary Clinton for Elle.com in her capacity as editor of the online Elle-sponsored 'zine, Marley Mag.

Dias hosted her first Netflix show that was revealed in September called "Bookmarks: Celebrating Black Voices". "Dias serves as the host and executive producer of the series, whose books and conversations center on themes of identity, respect, justice and action. Guests include: Chicago native, rapper, actor and writer Common; actor and author Lupita Nyong'o; comedian, actor and author Tiffany Haddish; actor and ”Little” executive producer Marsai Martin; singer, actor and poet Jill Scott; actor and activist Kendrick Sampson; actor and author Grace Byers; actor Caleb McLaughlin; TV personality Karamo Brown; ballerina and author Misty Copeland and author Jacqueline Woodson" writes the Chicago Tribune.

Since 2021, Dias has been the Ambassador for the National Education Association's Read Across America program.

== Books ==
- Marley Dias Gets it Done And So Can You, Marley Dias, 2019

== Awards ==
- 2017 - Smithsonian, American Ingenuity Award (Youth category)
- 2018 - Forbes, 30 Under 30
