= Shona Tucker =

American actress and director

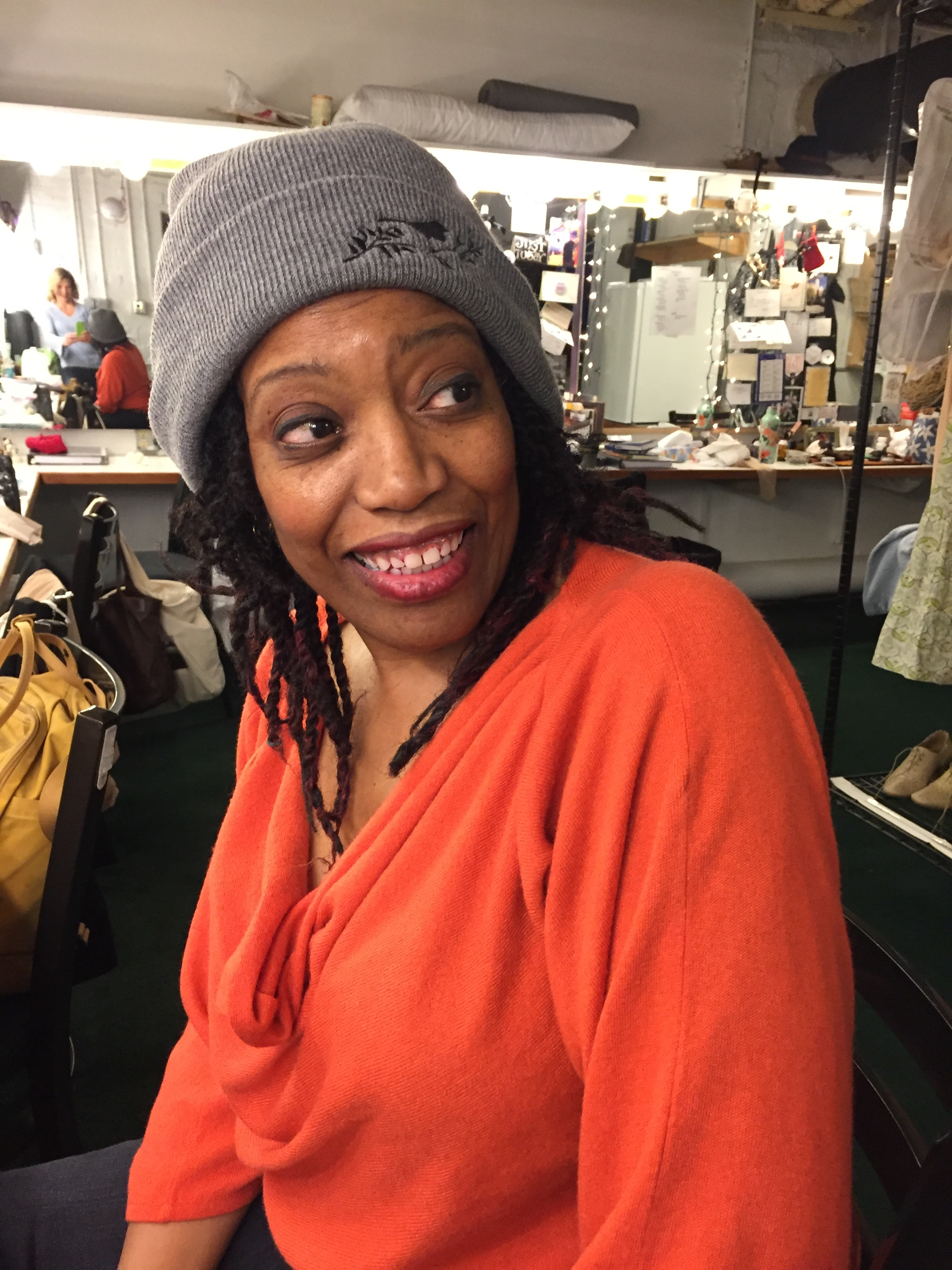
- Tucker in her dressing room for To Kill a Mockingbird
- Born: Louisville, Kentucky, U.S.
- Education: Northwestern University (BS); New York University (MFA)

Shona Tucker is an American actress and director. Beginning in the 1990s, she had roles in several television shows including Law & Order and New York Undercover. She has appeared in regional theater, including at the Oregon Shakespeare Festival, Off-Broadway at The Public Theater and elsewhere, in films such as 2016's King Cobra, and on Broadway in original cast of 2018's To Kill a Mockingbird with Jeff Daniels, and Death of a Salesman with Wendell Pierce. From 2008 until 2023 she taught in the Drama department at Vassar College, before becoming the chair of the Department of Theater Arts at the University of Louisville. She subsequently returned to Vassar College and is now a chair there, and continues to teach in their Drama department.

== Life and career ==
Tucker was born in Louisville Kentucky, where she began acting at the Louisville Youth Performing Arts School. While still in high school, she began her long relationship with Actors Theatre of Louisville as assistant to Paul Owen, the resident scenic designer as an intern on The Louisville Zoo 2. She has returned to perform at Actors Theatre in five different plays.

A Fulbright Scholar, a Schomburg Fellow, and an Audelco Award winner, she earned a BS from Northwestern University and MFA in Acting at NYU's Tisch School of the Arts. She has served as Professor of Drama at Vassar College from 2008 to the present.

She was a company member at Oregon Shakespeare Festival from 2005 to 2008, acting in such plays as Fences, A Midsummer Night's Dream, Gem of the Ocean, and Bus Stop.

Her Off-Broadway theatre credits include productions at New York Theatre Workshop, Lincoln Center Theater Directors' Lab, The Public Theater, Circle in the Square Theatre, Playwrights Horizons, Manhattan Theatre Club, and La MaMa Experimental Theatre Club.

She played the role of Rita in the world premiere of the award-winning play Eclipsed at Yale Repertory Theatre. She also created the roles of Sherry and Dr. Toros in Pulitzer Prize finalist Amy Herzog's Mary Jane, also at Yale Repertory Theatre. She created the roles of Angela and Angie in the world premiere of Tough Titty at Williamstown Theatre Festival.

Her feature film credits include: The Hating Game, James Franco's King Cobra (2016), Keane (2004), Preaching to the Choir (2005) and Boys on the Side (1995) with Whoopi Goldberg and Mary-Louise Parker.

Tucker has played roles in a number of television series including New York Undercover (recurring), Queens Supreme, Law & Order, and Third Watch. She has also acted in several TV movies and shorts.

== Works ==
=== Stage ===
==== Broadway ====
Title	Role	Venue	Notes
To Kill A Mockingbird	Ensemble, U/S Calpurnia	Shubert Theater	Original Broadway Cast
Death of a Salesman	U/S Linda Loman, Jazz singer, Miss Forsythe	Hudson Theatre	Original Broadway Cast

==== Off-Broadway ====
Title	Role	Venue	Notes
Twelfth Night	Feste	Joseph Papp Public Theatre	
The African Company Presents Richard III]	Sarah	Joseph Papp Public Theatre	Audelco Award
From the Mississippi Delta	Phelia	Circle in the Square Theatre	
Light Shining in Buckinghamshire	Hoskins	New York Theatre Workshop	
Marvin's Room	Dr. Charlotte	Playwrights Horizons	
The Investigation of the Murder in El Salvador	Singing Maid	New York Theatre Workshop	
Imperceptible Mutabilities	Buffy	Manhattan Theatre Club	

==== Regional Theater ====
Title	Role	Venue	Notes
Mary Jane	Sherry/Dr. Toros	Yale Repertory Theatre	Original Cast
Eclipsed	Rita	Yale Repertory Theatre	World Premiere
Love and Information	Many Roles	American Conservatory Theater	
Blithe Spirit	Ruth	American Conservatory Theater	
Tartuffe	Elmire	American Conservatory Theater	
Insurrection	Mama Mo'tel	American Conservatory Theater	
Fences	Rose	Oregon Shakespeare Festival	
Bus Stop	Grace	Oregon Shakespeare Festival	
Romeo and Juliet	Lady Capulet	Oregon Shakespeare Festival	
Gem of the Ocean	Black Mary	Oregon Shakespeare Festival	
Tough Titty	Angela	Williamstown Theatre Festival	

=== Film ===
Year	Film	Role
2016	King Cobra	Detective Banks
2009	Walk the Fish(Short)	Woman on the Bus
2005	Preaching to the Choir	Claretha
2004	Keane	Voice
1998	Trinity	Medical Examiner
1995	Boys on the Side	Hotel Clerk

==== Television ====
Year	Show	Role	Episode(s)
2011	Lights Out	Mary Reade	"The Comeback"
2003	Queens Supreme	Voice	"One Angry Man"
1999	Third Watch	Detox Counselor	"Anywhere But Here"
1994	New York Undercover	Det. Presley	"Tasha", "Garbage"
1990-1993	Law & Order	Dolores Ruffin (1993), Records Clerk (1990)	"Born Bad" (Dolores Ruffin), "Prescription for Death" (Records Clerk)
