= Florida Film Critics Circle Awards 2013 =

Film award ceremony

18th FFCC Awards

December 18, 2013

Best Picture:
12 Years a Slave

The 18th Florida Film Critics Circle Awards were given on December 18, 2013.

== Winners ==
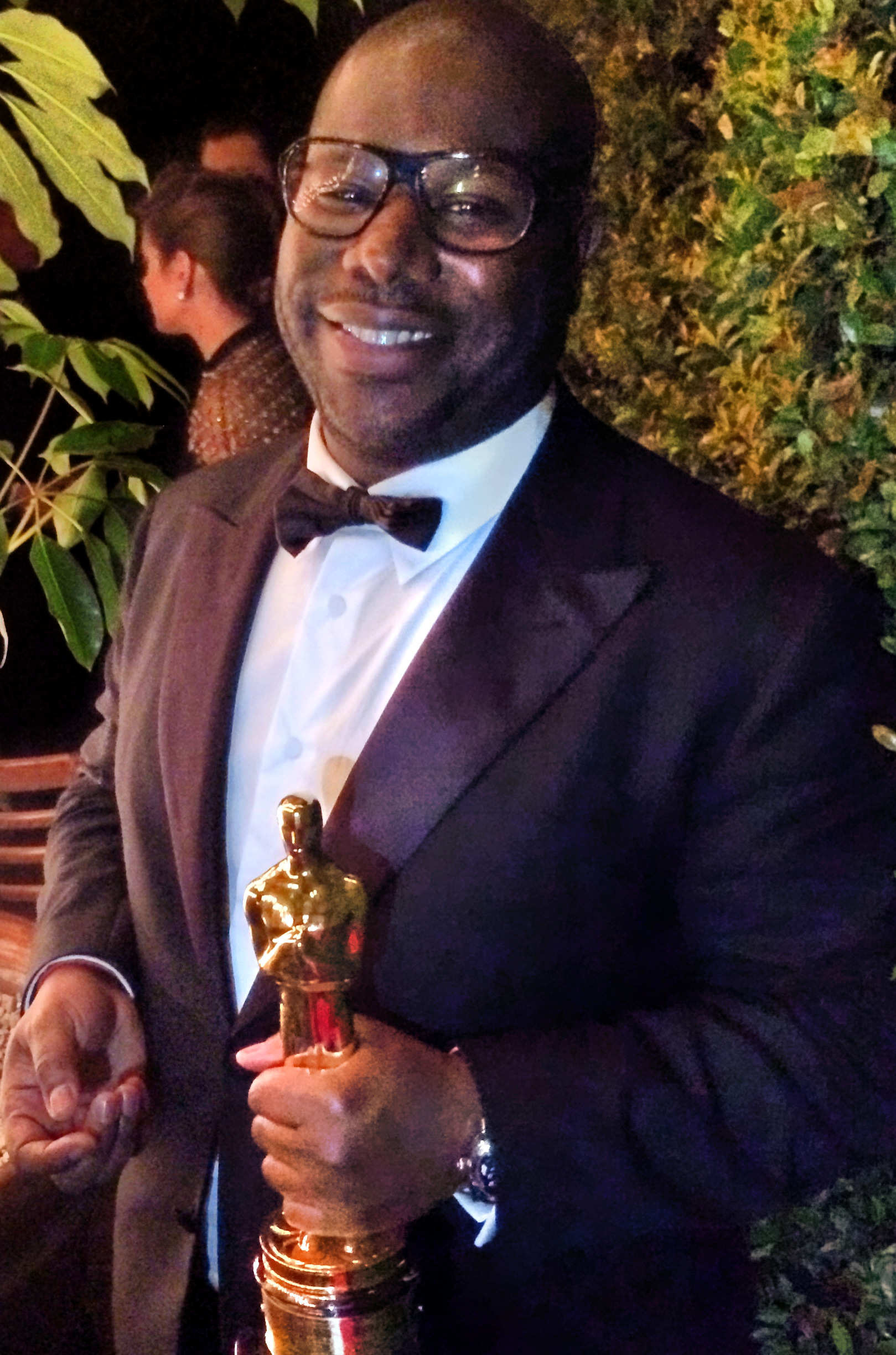
Steve McQueen, Best Director winner

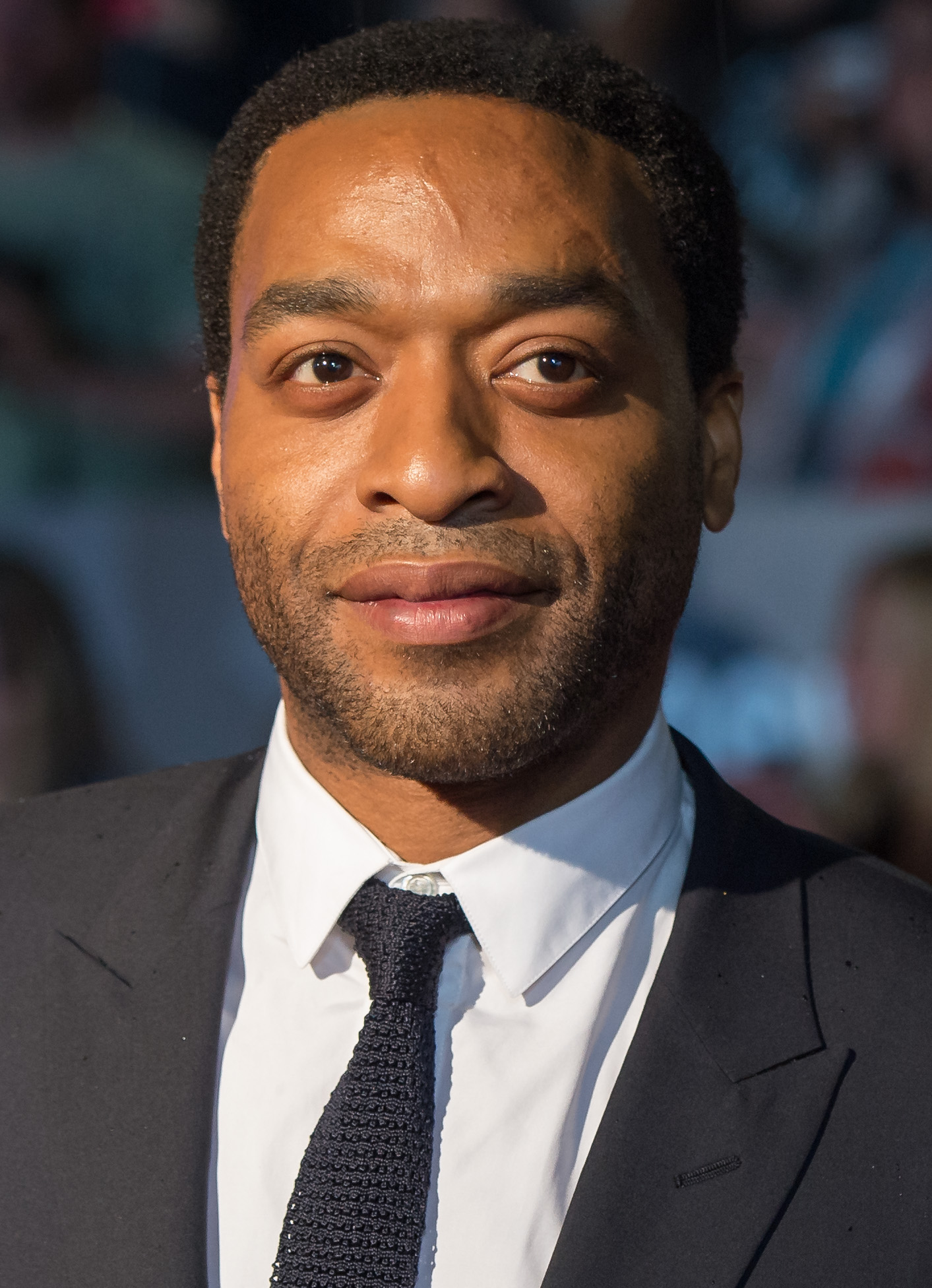
Chiwetel Ejiofor, Best Actor winner

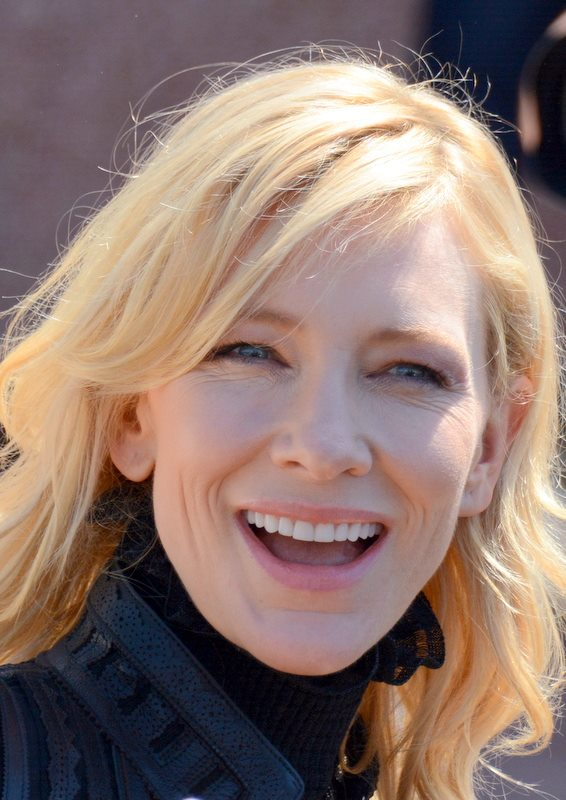
Cate Blanchett, Best Actress winner

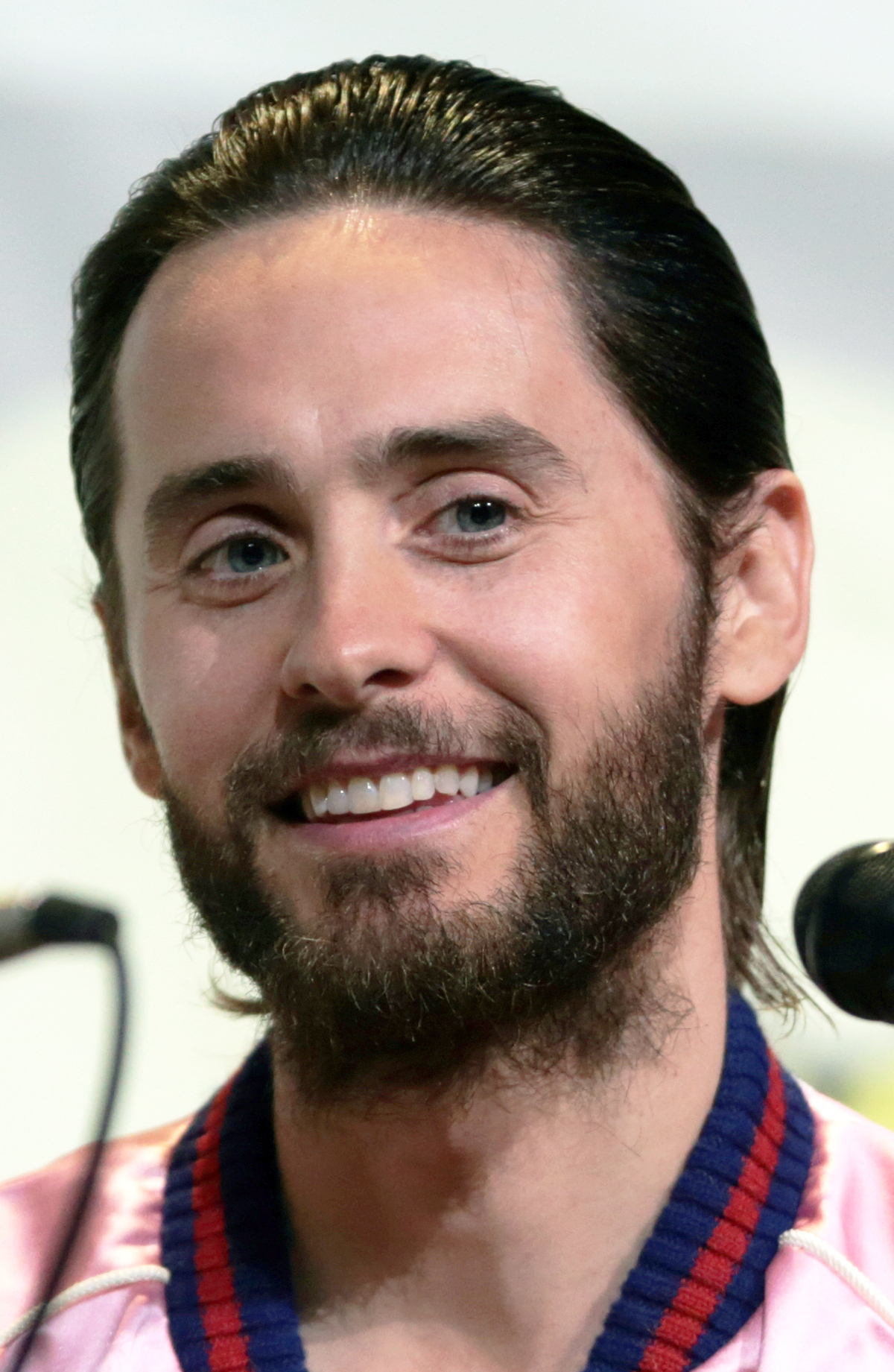
Jared Leto, Best Supporting Actor winner

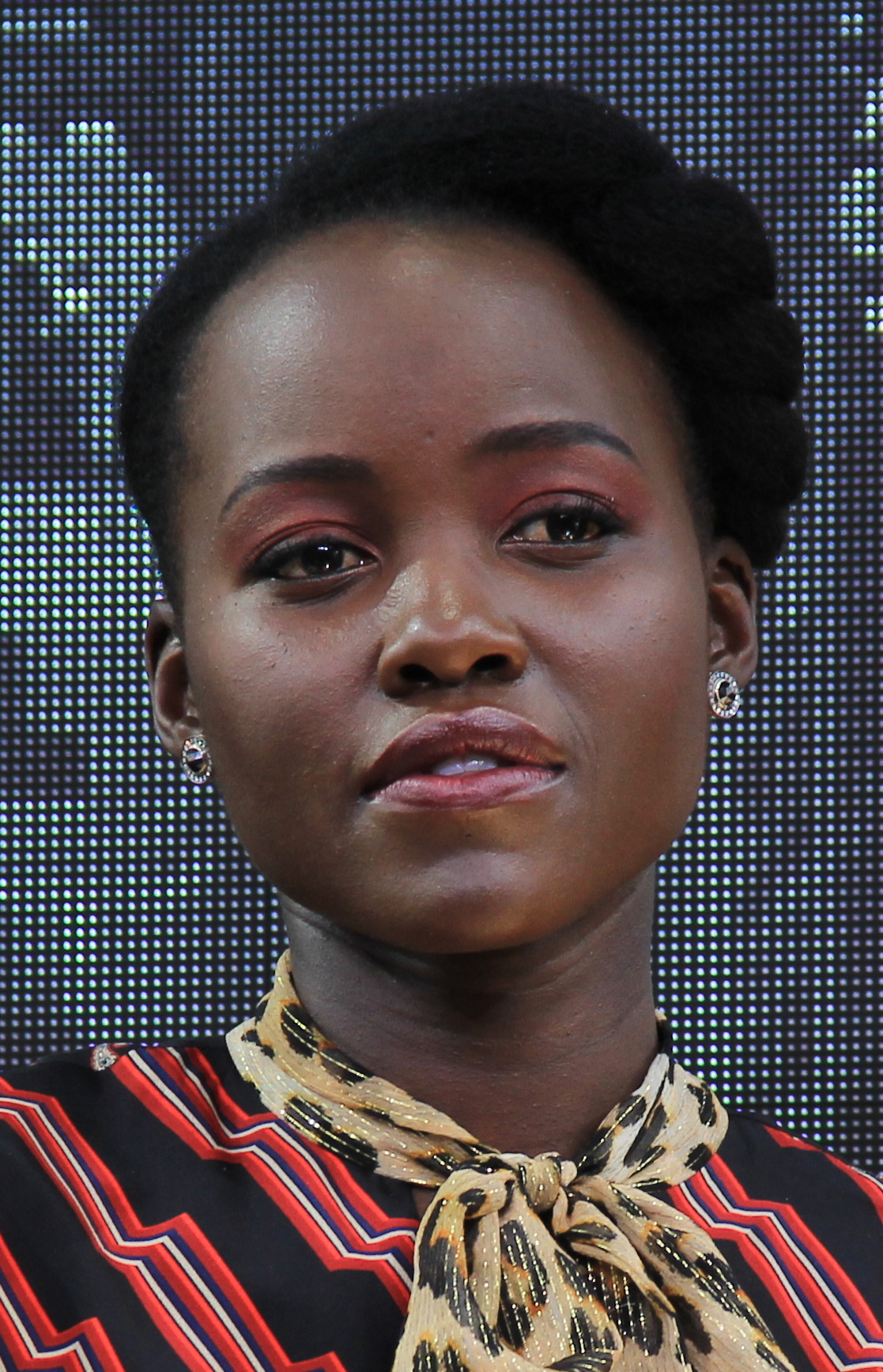
Lupita Nyong'o, Best Supporting Actress and Pauline Kael Breakout Award winner

=== Best Picture ===
12 Years a Slave

- Runner-up: American Hustle

=== Best Director ===
Steve McQueen – 12 Years a Slave

- Runner-up: Alfonso Cuarón – Gravity

=== Best Actor ===
Chiwetel Ejiofor – 12 Years a Slave

- Runner-up: Joaquin Phoenix – Her

=== Best Actress ===
Cate Blanchett – Blue Jasmine

- Runner-up: Judi Dench – Philomena

=== Best Supporting Actor ===
Jared Leto – Dallas Buyers Club

- Runner-up: Michael Fassbender – 12 Years a Slave

=== Best Supporting Actress ===
Lupita Nyong'o – 12 Years a Slave

- Runner-up: Jennifer Lawrence – American Hustle

=== Best Original Screenplay ===
Her – Spike Jonze

- Runner-up: American Hustle – David O. Russell and Eric Warren Singer

=== Best Adapted Screenplay ===
12 Years a Slave – John Ridley

- Runner-up: The Wolf of Wall Street – Terence Winter

=== Best Animated Feature ===
Frozen

- Runner-up: The Wind Rises

=== Best Documentary ===
The Act of Killing

- Runner-up: Blackfish

=== Best Foreign Language Film ===
Blue Is the Warmest Colour • France

- Runner-up: The Hunt • Denmark

=== Best Art Direction / Production Design ===
The Great Gatsby – Catherine Martin and Beverley Dunn

- Runner-up: American Hustle – Judy Becker and Heather Loeffler

=== Best Cinematography ===
Gravity – Emmanuel Lubezki

- Runner-up: Inside Llewyn Davis – Bruno Delbonnel

=== Best Visual Effects ===
Gravity

- Runner-up: The Hobbit: The Desolation of Smaug

=== Pauline Kael Breakout Award ===
Lupita Nyong'o – 12 Years a Slave

- Runner-up: Michael B. Jordan – Fruitvale Station

=== Golden Orange ===
Dana Keith of the Miami Beach Cinematheque for his tireless championing of foreign, independent and alternative film in South Florida for more than 20 years
