= Sulwe =

Children's book

- Author: Lupita Nyong'o
- Illustrator: Vashti Harrison
- Cover artist: Vashti Harrison
- Genre: Children's literature
- Publisher: Simon & Schuster Books for Young Readers
- Publication date: October 15, 2019
- Pages: 48 pages
- ISBN: 1534425365
- Website: Official Website

Sulwe is a 2019 children's picture book written by actress Lupita Nyong'o and illustrated by Vashti Harrison. It tells the story of a young girl who wishes for her dark skin to be lighter. In 2020, the Kiswahili and Dholuo translations of the book were made available in East Africa through Kenyan publishing firm Bunk Books.

== Synopsis ==
Sulwe is a five-year-old Kenyan girl who has the darkest skin in her family and at her school. She wishes for her skin to be lighter, but through a supernatural experience, she comes to love her dark skin color. (Note: Attributed to multiple references:)

== Reception ==
Sulwe became a number-one New York Times Best Seller and was selected for the 2020 Illustrator Honor at the Coretta Scott King Awards. It won the award for Outstanding Literary Work – Children at the 2020 NAACP Image Awards, and received starred reviews from Kirkus Reviews and Publishers Weekly. It was also reviewed by School Library Journal. Sulwe was pulled from classrooms in the Central York School District of Pennsylvania in 2021 and from Duval Country, Florida in January 2022.

== In media ==
Year	Outlet	Episode
October 8, 2019	The Tonight Show Starring Jimmy Fallon	"Lupita Nyong'o Captures Her Struggle with Colorism in a Children's Book"
October 8, 2019	Newsnight	"Lupita Nyong’o on Racism, Colourism, and Justin Trudeau"
October 15, 2019	Live with Kelly and Ryan	"Lupita Nyong'o Talks About Her Children's Book, Sulwe"
October 15, 2019	Good Morning America	"Lupita Nyong'o shares powerful story behind new children's book, Sulwe"
September 1, 2020	Netflix Bookmarks: Celebrating Black Voices	"Lupita Nyong'o Reads Sulwe"

== Film adaptation ==
In 2021, Netflix announced an animated musical film adaptation based on Sulwe, with Nyong'o as a producer.
