= In My Genes =

- Directed by: Lupita Nyong'o
- Written by: Lupita Nyong'o
- Produced by: Lupita Nyong'o
- Starring: Fatma Abdallah; Grace Karihe; Delphine Karumba; Benedict Kinyua
- Cinematography: Willie Owusu
- Edited by: Lupita Nyong'o
- Music by: Coire Williams; Benedict Kinyua
- Release date: 2009
- Running time: 77 minutes
- Country: Kenya
- Languages: Swahili; English

In My Genes is a 2009 Kenyan documentary film directed, written, produced and edited by Lupita Nyong'o in her directing debut. It follows the lives of eight Kenyans who have albinism. It gives us an intimate look at albinism and challenges us to think about what it's like to be a prominent but invisible group in a largely Black society.

== Synopsis ==
How does one live as a pale person in a dominantly Black society? What does it feel like to be one of the most visible person and probably, one of the most ignored? Agnes, an albino woman in Kenya, feels it daily. Ever since she was born, she has had to deal with the prejudices that surround albinos. In My Genes bears witness to the lives of eight people who suffer discrimination due to a simple genetic anomaly. It tells a touching story of Agnes, who has seven children and a 17-year-old daughter who is expecting a kid. Agnes learns the truth about why she lost both of her eyes and that she has skin cancer during the documentary. She continues, believing in the might of her God and the labor of her hands.

== Cast ==
- Fatma Abdallah as Herself
- Grace Karihe as Herself
- Delphine Karumba as Herself
- Benedict Kinyua as Himself
- Pamela Mukami as Herself
- Alex Munyere as Himself
- James Mutai as Himself
- Agnes Muthakaye as Herself
- Isaac Mwaura as Himself
- C.K. Nyambura as Herself
- Wycliffe Ogutu as Himself

== Awards ==
- Festival de Cine Africano de México 2008

== See also ==
- Persecution of people with albinism
