= Eclipsed (play) =

Play written by Danai Gurira

- 2016 playbill
- Original language: English
- Written by: Danai Gurira
- Characters: Helena (Wife #1); Maima (Wife #2); Bessie (Wife #3); The Girl (Wife #4); Rita
- Subject: Sisterhood, Rape, Kidnapping, Survival, Peace
- Genre: Drama
- Setting: In a small, one room shack on the Liberian compound

Premiere
- Date: September 2009
- Official website

Eclipsed is a play written by Danai Gurira. It takes place in 2003 and tells the story of five Liberian women and their tale of survival near the end of the Second Liberian Civil War. It became the first play with an all-black and female cast and creative team to premiere on Broadway.

Eclipsed premiered at Woolly Mammoth Theatre Company in Washington, DC in 2009, then opened in London at the Gate Theatre in April 2015 in a production starring Letitia Wright. An American Off-Broadway production followed shortly afterwards at The Public Theater in October 2015 with positive reviews and ran until November 2015. The following year, it transferred to Broadway, premiering at the John Golden Theatre with an opening on March 6, 2016. Its Broadway run closed on June 19, 2016.

== Synopsis ==
Eclipsed takes place in the country of Liberia in 2003 at a bullet-ridden one room shack, which serves as an army camp for the rebel group called Liberians United for Reconciliation and Democracy (LURD), which aimed to depose Charles Taylor, the then president of Liberia. The unseen Commanding Officer kidnaps two young women (Helena & Bessie) and makes them his "wives" by forcing them to have sex with him whenever he wants it. The women are helping to care for a bright 15-year-old (The Girl), who has also been abducted and raped after being discovered by the C.O.. Soon, Maima returns from the battlefield, where she was fighting as a soldier. She tries to convince The Girl to leave the C.O. and become a soldier with her. Rita, who works for a peace organization, makes occasional visits at the compound to end conflict. The Girl now seems to resign herself to her new life in the compound with limited options to choose from—stay with an abusive C.O. or become a soldier, while the others will try to make sense of this difficult situation.

== Development and productions ==
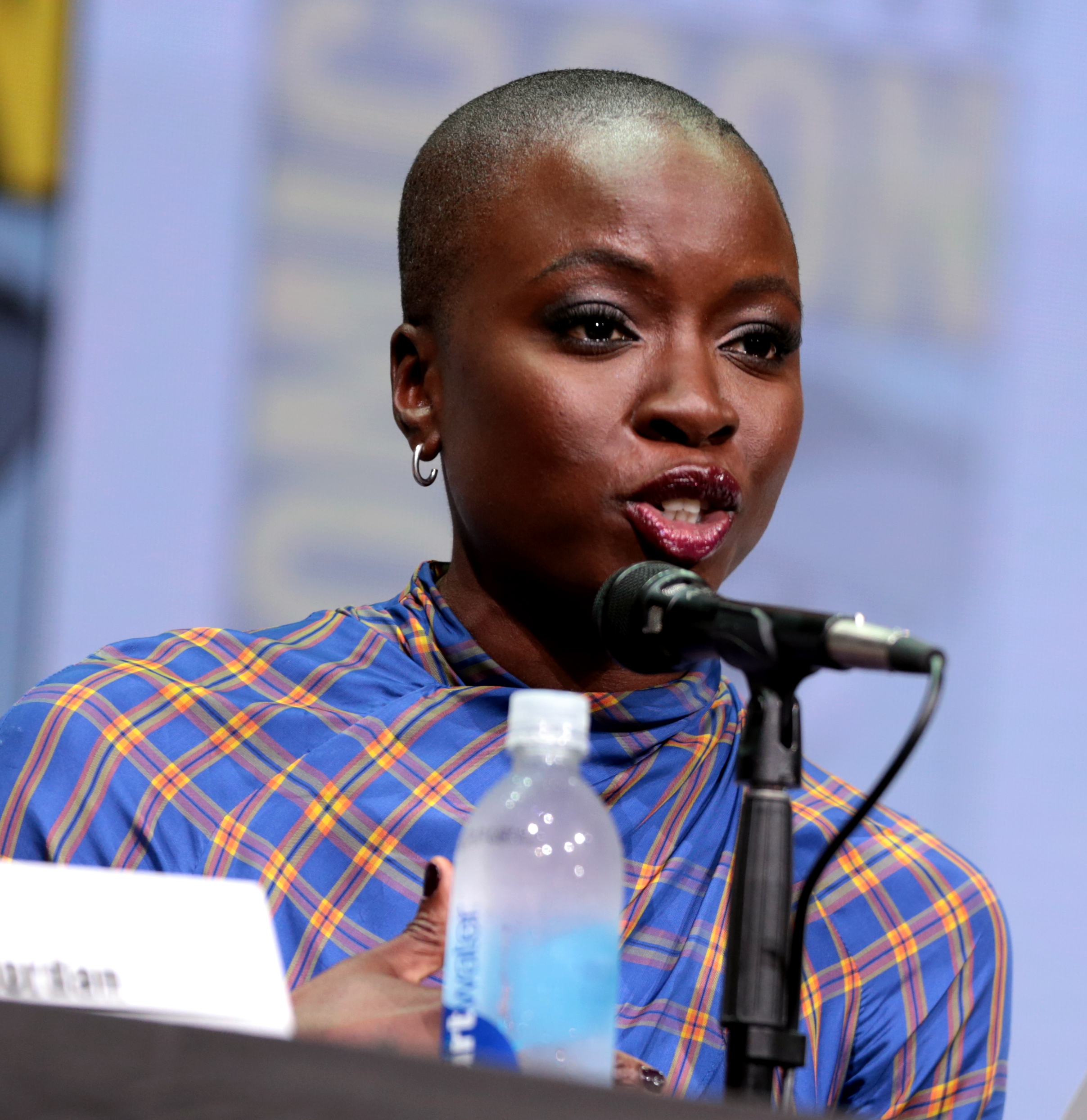
Eclipsed was penned by Zimbabwean American actress and playwright Danai Gurira.

Gurira's inspiration for the play was a photo of Black Diamond, a female Liberian freedom fighter, in The New York Times. The image prompted curiosity about Liberia's fourteen-year civil wars and a trip to Liberia in 2007. Gurira interviewed more than 30 women—who had been raped, among whose daughters that had been taken by rebel fighters and turned into sex slaves. She also spoke to female peace activists who were instrumental in ending the violence. The names of the women in Eclipsed come from the people Gurira met during her travels, whereas the fifth character is unnamed.

Eclipsed was developed at the Woolly Mammoth Theatre Company in Washington, D.C., where the play first premiered in September 2009 and was directed by South African director Liesl Tommy. During its Washington, D.C. run, Eclipsed ran at the Center Theatre Group in Culver City, California, from September to October 2009, where play was directed by Robert O'Hara. Soon, the play ran at the Yale Repertory Theatre in New Haven, Connecticut from October to November 2009, where it was also directed by Tommy.

While filming The Walking Dead in Atlanta, Georgia, Gurira traveled back and forth to New York City, where she was preparing for The Public Theater's run of Eclipsed. The production was added to The Public Theater's 2015–16 season and it began Off-Broadway previews on September 29 with an opening night for October 14 at The Public's LuEsther Theater. The play was directed by Liesl Tommy and it starred Lupita Nyong'o as The Girl, Saycon Sengbloh as Helena, Akosua Busia as Rita, Zainab Jah as Maima, and Pascale Armand as Bessie. Eclipsed was extended several times until the play closed on November 29, 2015. It became The Public's fastest-selling new production in recent history.

The Off-Broadway production of Eclipsed transferred to Broadway at the John Golden Theatre, with cast reprising their respective roles. Tommy, who directed The Public Theater's production, directed the Broadway production. Eclipsed began previews on February 23, 2016, with an official opening on March 6, 2016. The play marked the Broadway debut for Nyong'o, who turned down Hollywood films to bring the production to Broadway. The production was a limited engagement and closed on June 19, 2016, after 14 previews and 121 regular performances.

Gurira and Tommy joined the cast of Eclipsed in June 2016, where they surprised the audience during the curtain call live on Facebook to announce plans for Carole Shorenstein Hays to bring the production to the West Coast at the Curran Theatre in San Francisco, California for a limited engagement in Spring 2017.

== Characters and original casts ==
Character	Woolly Mammoth Theatre (2009)	Yale Repertory Theatre (2009)	Off-Broadway Cast (2015)	Broadway Cast (2016)
Helena (Wife Number One)	Uzo Aduba	Stacey Sargeant	Saycon Sengbloh	Saycon Sengbloh
Maima (Wife Number Two)	Jessica Frances Dukes	Zainab Jah	Zainab Jah	Zainab Jah
Bessie (Wife Number Three)	Liz Femi Wilson	Pascale Armand	Pascale Armand	Pascale Armand
The Girl (Wife Number Four)	Ayesha Ngaujah	Adepero Oduye	Lupita Nyong'o	Lupita Nyong'o
Rita	Dawn Ursula	Shona Tucker	Akosua Busia	Akosua Busia

Sengbloh left the Off-Broadway show and was replaced by Stacey Sargeant on November 3 until the end of the production. She made her return as the role of Helena in the Broadway production.

Other productions include:

- Detroit Repertory Theatre, March 27 - May 17, 2026

== Awards and nominations ==
=== 2009 premiere ===
Year	Award	Category	Nominee	Result
2010	Helen Hayes Awards	The Charles MacArthur Award for Outstanding New Play or Musical	Danai Gurira	Won
2010	NAACP Theatre Awards	Best Playwright	Danai Gurira	Won

=== Off-Broadway production ===
Year	Award	Category	Nominee	Result
2016	Lucille Lortel Awards	Outstanding Play		Nominated
2016	Lucille Lortel Awards	Outstanding Costume Design	Clint Ramos	Nominated
2016	Lucille Lortel Awards	Outstanding Director	Liesl Tommy	Won
2016	Obie Awards	Obie Award for Distinguished Performance by an Ensemble	Lupita Nyong'o, Saycon Sengbloh, Pascale Armand, Akosua Busia and Zainab Jah	Won
2016	Drama Desk Awards	Outstanding Featured Actress in a Play	Saycon Sengbloh	Won
2016	Drama Desk Awards	Sam Norkin Award	Danai Gurira	Won

=== Broadway production ===
Year	Award	Category	Nominee	Result
2016	Outer Critics Circle Award	Outstanding New Broadway Play		Nominated
2016	Outer Critics Circle Award	Outstanding Actress in a Play	Lupita Nyong'o	Nominated
2016	Outer Critics Circle Award	Outstanding Featured Actress in a Play	Pascale Armand	Won
2016	Outer Critics Circle Award	Outstanding Featured Actress in a Play	Zainab Jah	Nominated
2016	Outer Critics Circle Award	Outstanding Featured Actress in a Play	Saycon Sengbloh	Nominated
2016	Drama League Award	Outstanding Production of a Broadway or Off-Broadway Play		Nominated
2016	Drama League Award	Distinguished Performance Award	Lupita Nyong'o	Nominated
2016	Theatre World Award	Outstanding Broadway or Off-Broadway Debut Performance	Lupita Nyong'o	Won
2016	Broadway.com Audience Awards	Favorite Leading Actress in a Play	Lupita Nyong'o	Won
2016	The Lilly Awards	Playwright Award	Danai Gurira	Won
2016	Tony Award	Tony Award for Best Play		Nominated
2016	Tony Award	Tony Award for Best Actress in a Play	Lupita Nyong'o	Nominated
2016	Tony Award	Tony Award for Best Featured Actress in a Play	Saycon Sengbloh	Nominated
2016	Tony Award	Tony Award for Best Featured Actress in a Play	Pascale Armand	Nominated
2016	Tony Award	Tony Award for Best Costume Design	Clint Ramos	Won
2016	Tony Award	Tony Award for Best Direction of a Play	Liesl Tommy	Nominated

== Critical response ==
The production received positive reviews On and Off-Broadway. Charles Isherwood of The New York Times wrote a rave review, stating "The superlative performances from all five actors, under Ms. Tommy's sensitive direction, draw us so deeply into the lives of the women that this darkness nevertheless flickers with glimmers of light, humanity and even hope." Isherwood went on to praise Nyongo's performance: "Ms. Nyong'o delivers this harrowing monologue with a disoriented sense of helplessness and shame that cuts to the bone." Adam Feldman of Time Out New York gave the play four stars and wrote that "all four of the actors portraying these women are superb; Nyong'o is as radiant as one would expect from this rising star, but the others shine as brightly". Marilyn Stasio of Variety wrote: "...the play gives voice to women ranging from the wives of warlords to activists in Women of Liberia Mass Action for Peace..."

Robert Kahn of NBC New York described Eclipsed as a "colorful and fiery drama". Jeremy Gerald of Deadline wrote: "Eclipsed is a major achievement - a scorching work about women and war whose humor burnishes rather than undermines its seriousness of purpose. And it features a ferociously committed ensemble performances staged with power and finesse by Leisl Tommy". Leah Greenblatt of Entertainment Weekly felt the script didn't match up to the cast. However, she went on and praised the performances: "Nyong'o is captivating to watch, as are all the women in the cast....the overall impact is still startling..." Los Angeles Times critic Charles McNulty praised Nyong'o's performance as: "This is an ensemble piece, not a star vehicle, but Nyong'o can't help standing out even as the girl becomes a fully fledged member of this unenviable community of war-ravaged women. Her plight is terrifying, and Nyong'o makes the tragedy achingly personal."

The play received a score of 88 on Show Score from 570 reviews from members which indicate the play was "Excellent" on the platform.

The play also has a score of 83 on Broadway score platform from 28 critics, indicating rave and it's "Critical Gold"

== Publication ==
- Gurira, Danai. Eclipsed. New York: Dramatists Play Service, 2010. ISBN 978-0-822-22446-4
