= Bookmarks (TV program) =

American streaming television series

- Genre: Educational
- Directed by: Fracaswell Hyman
- Presented by: Marley Dias
- Starring: Various
- Ending theme: "Don't Forget Who You Are" by Common feat. PJ
- Country of origin: United States
- Original language: English
- No. of seasons: 1
- No. of episodes: 12

Production
- Executive producers: Jesse Collins; Fracaswell Hyman; Marley Dias; Dionne Harmon; David Talbert; Lyn Talbert
- Producer: Tiffany Haddish
- Editors: Gerrad Holtz; Hector Lopez; Chris Smith
- Running time: 3-11 minutes
- Production company: Jesse Collins Entertainment

Original release
- Network: Netflix
- Release: September 1, 2020 – present

Bookmarks is an educational television series presented by Marley Dias. Produced by Jesse Collins Entertainment for Netflix and directed by Fracaswell Hyman, the series premiered on September 1, 2020.

== Cast ==
- Tiffany Haddish
- Grace Byers
- Caleb McLaughlin
- Lupita Nyong'o
- Marsai Martin
- Karamo Brown
- Jill Scott
- Misty Copeland
- Common
- Jacqueline Woodson
- Kendrick Sampson
- Marley Dias

== Episodes ==
No.	Title	Original release date
1	"Tiffany Haddish Reads I Love My Hair"	September 1, 2020
Tiffany Haddish reads "I Love My Hair" by Natasha Tarpley.
2	"Grace Byers Reads I Am Enough"	September 1, 2020
Author Grace Byers reads her book "I Am Enough".
3	"Caleb McLaughlin Reads Crown: An Ode to the Fresh Cut"	September 1, 2020
Caleb McLaughlin reads "Crown: An Ode to the Fresh Cut" by Derrick Barnes.
4	"Lupita Nyong'o Reads Sulwe"	September 1, 2020
Author Lupita Nyong'o reads her book "Sulwe".
5	"Marsai Martin Reads ABCs For Girls Like Me"	September 1, 2020
Marsai Martin reads "ABCs For Girls Like Me" by Melanie Goolsby.
6	"Karamo Brown Reads I Am Perfectly Designed"	September 1, 2020
Co-author and Queer Eye co-star Karamo Brown reads "I Am Perfectly Designed".
7	"Jill Scott Reads Pretty Brown Face and Brown Boy Joy"	September 1, 2020
Jill Scott reads Andrea Davis Pinkney's book "Pretty Brown Face" and "Brown Boy Joy" by Thomishia Booker.
8	"Misty Copeland Reads Firebird"	September 1, 2020
Author Misty Copeland reads her book "Firebird".
9	"Common Reads Let's Talk About Race"	September 1, 2020
Rapper Common reads "Let's Talk About Race" by Julius Lester.
10	"Jacqueline Woodson Reads The Day You Begin"	September 1, 2020
Author Jacqueline Woodson reads her book "The Day You Begin".
11	"Kendrick Sampson Reads Antiracist Baby"	September 1, 2020
Kendrick Sampson reads "Antiracist Baby" by Ibram X. Kendi.
12	"Marley Dias Reads We March"	September 1, 2020
Marley Dias reads "We March" by Shane Evans.

== Release ==
Bookmarks was released on September 1, 2020, on Netflix.
