= Lupita Nyong'o =

Actress (born 1983)

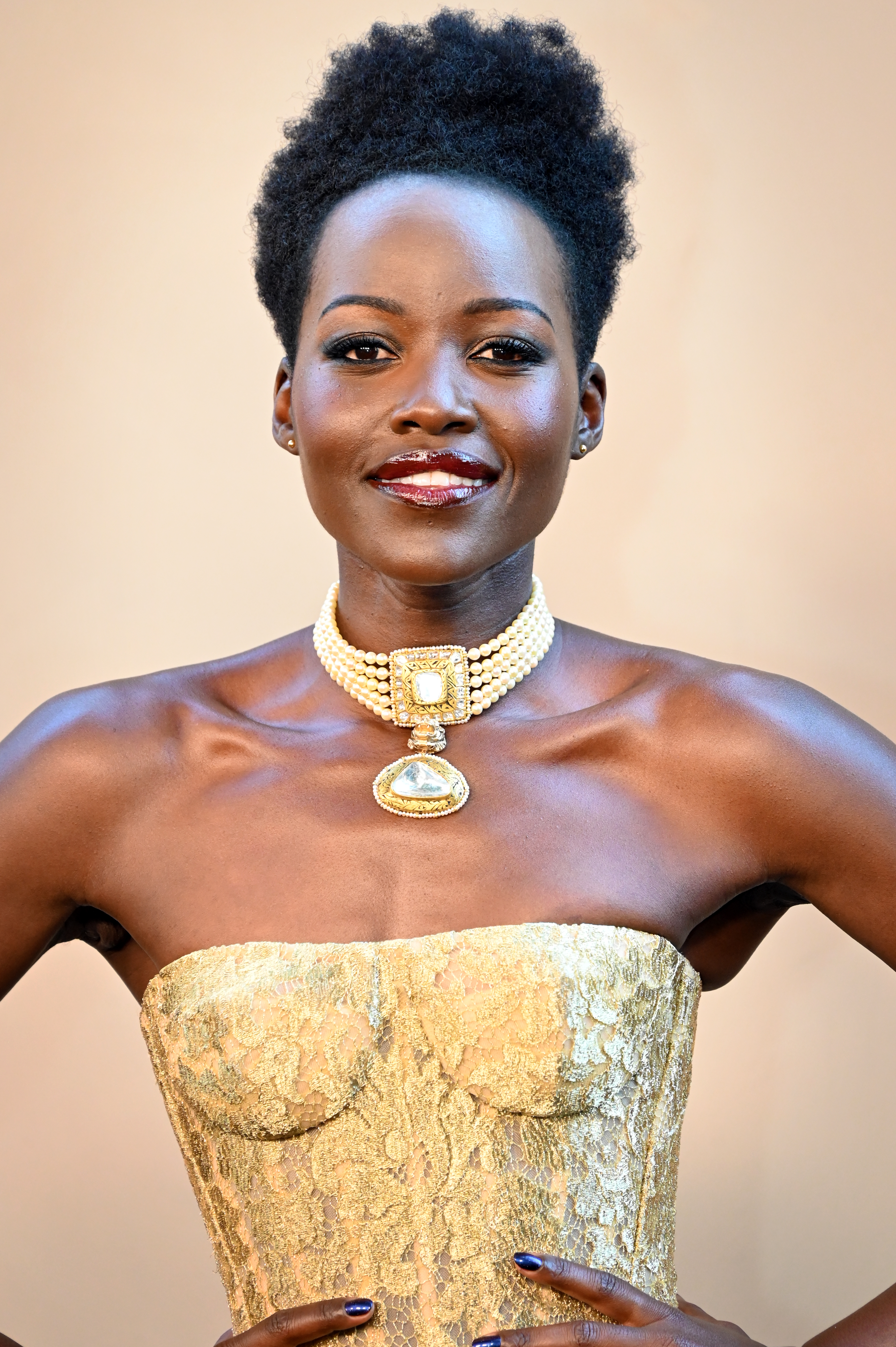
- Nyong'o in 2026
- Born: Lupita Amondi Nyong'o; 1 March 1983 (age 43); Mexico City, Mexico
- Citizenship: Mexico; Kenya; US
- Education: Hampshire College (BA); Yale University (MFA)
- Occupation: Actress
- Years active: 2005–present
- Father: Anyang' Nyong'o
- Relatives: Isis Nyong'o (cousin); Tavia Nyong'o (cousin)
- Awards: Full list

Lupita Amondi Nyong'o (Note: "Lupita Nyong'o" pronunciation: US: /luːˈpiːtə ˈnjɔːŋoʊ/, loo-PEE-tə NYAWNG-oh; Swahili: [luˈpitɑ ˈɲɔŋɔ]; Spanish: [luˈpita ˈɲoŋɡo]) (born 1 March 1983) is an actress who has received various accolades, including an Academy Award, an Actor Award and a Daytime Emmy Award, as well as nominations for two British Academy Film Awards, a Golden Globe Award and a Tony Award. She is known for her roles in films, television series, and stage productions such as 12 Years a Slave (2013), for which she won the Academy Award for Best Supporting Actress; the play Eclipsed (2015), for which she was nominated for the Tony Award for Best Actress in a Play; Black Panther (2018) and its sequel Black Panther: Wakanda Forever (2022); the horror films Us (2019) and A Quiet Place: Day One (2024); the animated film The Wild Robot (2024); and Christopher Nolan's epic The Odyssey (2026).

In 2014, Nyong'o was named the most beautiful woman by People. In 2019, she authored the children's book Sulwe, which became a number-one New York Times Best-Seller. In 2020, she was named one of Africa's 50 Most Powerful Women by Forbes. Nyong'o has been nominated twice for the Primetime Emmy Award for Outstanding Narrator for narrating the documentary series Serengeti.

== Early life and education ==
Lupita Amondi Nyong'o was born on 1 March 1983 in Mexico City, Mexico. (Note: Attributed to multiple references:) She is the second of six children. Both her mother, Dorothy Ogada Buyu, and her father, Anyang' Nyong'o, are Kenyan and are of Luo descent. It is a Luo tradition to name a child after the events of the day, so Nyong'o's parents gave her the Spanish name Lupita, a diminutive of Guadalupe. At the time of her birth, her father was a visiting lecturer in political science at El Colegio de México in Mexico City. The family had left Kenya in 1980 for a period because of political repression and unrest; Lupita's uncle, Charles Nyong'o, disappeared after he was thrown off a ferry in 1980.

Nyong'o's family returned to Kenya when she was under a year old, after her father was appointed as a professor at the University of Nairobi. She grew up primarily in Nairobi, and has described her upbringing as middle class and suburban. Her family was artistic, and family get-togethers often included performances by the children and trips to see plays. Nyong'o was raised as a Christian and attended an all-girls Catholic school for the first six years of her life. She later attended Rusinga International School, where she performed in school plays.

At the age of 14, Nyong'o made her professional acting debut as Juliet in William Shakespeare's Romeo and Juliet, in a production by the Nairobi-based repertory company Phoenix Players. While a member of the Phoenix Players, she also performed in the plays On The Razzle and There Goes The Bride. She credits the performances of Whoopi Goldberg and Oprah Winfrey in The Color Purple with inspiring her to pursue an acting career.

When Nyong'o was 16, her parents sent her to Mexico for seven months to learn Spanish. She lived in Taxco, Guerrero, and took classes at the Universidad Nacional Autónoma de México's Learning Centre for Foreigners. She later attended St. Mary's School in Nairobi, where she received an IB Diploma in 2001, finishing second in her class. She then attended Hampshire College in the United States, graduating with a bachelor's degree in film and theatre studies. Nyong'o holds Mexican, Kenyan, and U.S. citizenship and identifies as "Kenyan-Mexican".

Nyong'o's father is a former member of the Kenyan Parliament and the Kenyan Senate, and is a former Minister for Medical Services. He is currently the governor of Kisumu County.

== Career ==
=== 2000s: Early work ===
Nyong'o began her career working on the production crew for several films, including Fernando Meirelles's The Constant Gardener (2005), Mira Nair's The Namesake (2006), and Salvatore Stabile's Where God Left His Shoes (2007). She cites Ralph Fiennes, the British star of The Constant Gardener, as someone who inspired her to pursue a professional acting career. In 2008, she starred in the short film East River, directed by Marc Grey and shot in Brooklyn. She returned to Kenya that same year and appeared in the Kenyan television series Shuga, an MTV Base Africa/UNICEF drama about HIV/AIDS prevention.

In 2009, Nyong'o wrote, directed, and produced the documentary In My Genes, about the discriminatory treatment of Kenya's albino population. It played at several film festivals and won first prize at the 2008 Five College Film Festival. The same year, Nyong'o directed the music video for Wahu's song "The Little Things You Do", which was nominated for the Best Video Award at the MTV Africa Music Awards 2009.

=== 2010s: Breakthrough and rise to prominence ===
While pursuing a master's degree in acting at the Yale School of Drama, Nyong'o appeared in many stage productions, including Gertrude Stein's Doctor Faustus Lights the Lights, Chekhov's Uncle Vanya, and William Shakespeare's The Taming of the Shrew and The Winter's Tale. Her acting talent earned her the university's Herschel Williams Prize in the 2011–12 academic year.

Upon graduating from Yale, Nyong'o landed her breakthrough role when she was cast in Steve McQueen's historical drama 12 Years a Slave (2013). The film is based on the life of Solomon Northup (Chiwetel Ejiofor), a free-born African-American man of upstate New York who is kidnapped and sold into slavery in Washington, D.C. in 1841. Nyong'o portrays Patsey, a slave who works alongside Northup at a Louisiana cotton plantation. Ian Freer of Empire wrote that Nyong'o gave "one of the most committed big-screen debuts imaginable", while Peter Travers of Rolling Stone called her a "spectacular young actress who imbues Patsey with grit and radiant grace".

For her performance, Nyong'o was nominated for the Golden Globe Award for Best Supporting Actress, the BAFTA Award for Best Actress in a Supporting Role, and two Screen Actors Guild Awards, including Best Supporting Actress, which she won. She also won the Academy Award for Best Supporting Actress, becoming the sixth Black actress, the second African and the first Mexican to win the award. In addition, she became the first Kenyan actress to win an Academy Award. (Note: Attributed to multiple references:) Bibby Sowry of The Telegraph said that the blue Prada dress Nyong'o wore to the Academy Awards "cemented itself in Hollywood history". In 2025, Nyongo recalled that her Academy Award win did not immediately translate into offers for leading roles. Instead, she was offered what she described as stereotyped roles, such as slave roles. At that point, she decided she would rather work less than perpetuate stereotypes that are expected of Africans.

Nyong'o's first role after her Academy Award was the CGI character Maz Kanata in Star Wars: The Force Awakens (2015). Nyong'o had wanted to play a role where her appearance was not central to the character, and performing Maz through motion capture provided a different challenge from her role as Patsey. Scott Mendelson of Forbes described Maz as "the center of the film's best sequence", while Stephanie Zacharek of Time called her a "delightful minor character". Nyong'o was nominated for Best Supporting Actress at the 42nd Saturn Awards and Best Virtual Performance at the 2016 MTV Movie Awards for her performance as Maz.

Also in 2015, Nyong'o starred as an unnamed girl in the play Eclipsed, written by Danai Gurira. The play takes place during the chaos of the Second Liberian Civil War, where the captive wives of a rebel officer band together to form a community, until the balance of their lives is upset by the arrival of a new girl, played by Nyong'o. Eclipsed became the Public Theater's fastest-selling new production in recent history and won Nyong'o an Obie Award for Outstanding Performance. In 2016, the play premiered on Broadway at the John Golden Theatre. It was the first play to premiere on Broadway with an all-Black and all female cast and creative team. Nyong'o had understudied the play at Yale in 2009 and was terrified to play the character onstage. She turned down film roles in favor of the production.

Nyong'o's performance in Eclipsed was praised by Charles Isherwood of The New York Times, who hailed her as "one of the most radiant young actors to be seen on Broadway in recent seasons", and added that she "shines with a compassion that makes us see beyond the suffering to the indomitable humanity of [the] characters." Her performance earned her a Theatre World Award for Outstanding Broadway or Off-Broadway Debut Performance and a nomination for the Tony Award for Best Actress in a Play. She was nominated for Outstanding Actress in a Play at the Outer Critics Circle Award and the Distinguished Performance Award at the Drama League Award. (Note: Attributed to multiple references:)

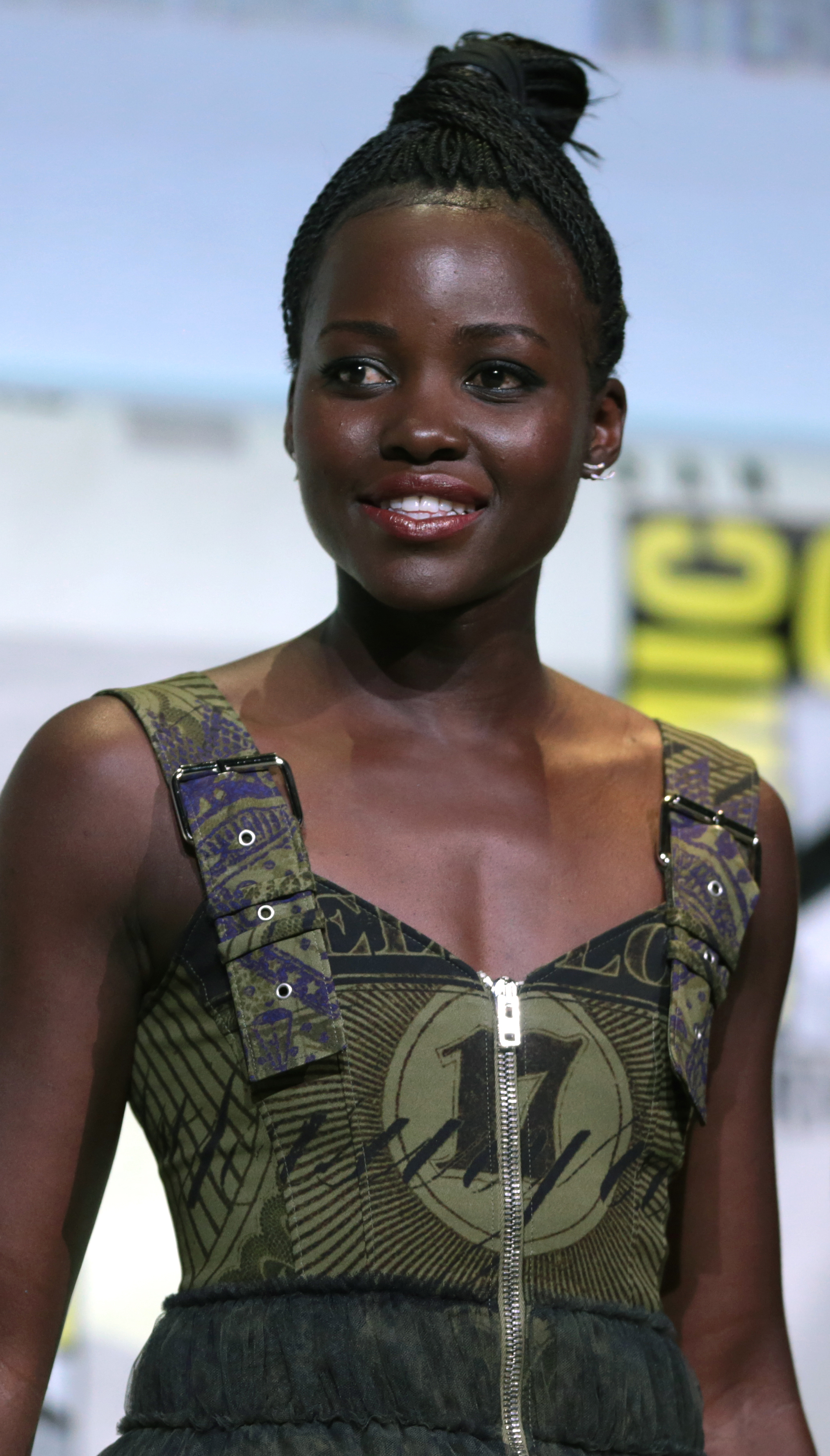
Nyong'o at the 2016 San Diego Comic-Con

Nyong'o co-starred in Jon Favreau's The Jungle Book (2016), a CGI adaptation of the 1967 animated film The Jungle Book. She provided the voice of Raksha, a mother wolf who adopts the boy Mowgli, played by Neel Sethi. Robbie Collin of The Telegraph wrote in his review of the film that Nyong'o brought a "gentle dignity" to her role. Nyong'o then co-starred in Mira Nair's Queen of Katwe (2016), a biopic based on the true story of Ugandan chess prodigy Phiona Mutesi (Madina Nalwanga). Nyong'o played Phiona's protective mother, Nakku Harriet. Brian Tallerico of RogerEbert.com described Nyong'o as "phenomenal", with "an incredible ability to convey backstory." Geoff Berkshire of Variety wrote that Nyong'o "imbues what could have been a stock mother figure with such inner fire that Harriet feels worthy of a movie all her own."

In 2018, Nyong'o starred as the spy Nakia in Ryan Coogler's Black Panther, the eighteenth film in the Marvel Cinematic Universe. In preparation for the role, she learned to speak Xhosa and trained in judo, jujitsu, silat, and Filipino martial arts. David Betancourt of The Washington Post praised Nyong'o for avoiding stereotypes of a Black female lead, stating that she "throws punches, shoots guns and steals hearts in a role she seems born for." Black Panther grossed over $1.34 billion worldwide, becoming the eleventh highest-grossing film in history at the time. Nyong'o was nominated for the Saturn Award for Best Actress for her performance.

Following the success of Black Panther, Nyong'o starred as a kindergarten teacher facing a zombie apocalypse in the comedy horror film Little Monsters (2019). Amy Nicholson of Variety wrote that Nyong'o's "deadpan humor and grace ennoble the slapstick" of the film. The 2019 South by Southwest film and music festival marked the premiere of Nyong'o's next release, Jordan Peele's psychological horror film Us, which depicts a group of family members who are confronted by their doppelgängers. Emily Yoshida of Vulture called Nyong'o's performance in her dual role "astounding" and described her portrayal of the doppelgänger as an "achievement on another level; a physical, vocal, and emotional performance so surgical in its uncanniness that it almost feels like it could not be the work of a flesh-and-blood human."

Us grossed over $255 million worldwide against its $20 million budget. At Universal Studios Hollywood's Halloween Horror Nights, Nyong'o appeared in costume as her character Red. She earned a Screen Actors Guild nomination for Outstanding Performance by a Female Actor in a Leading Role and won an NAACP Image Award for Best Actress. Also in 2019, Nyong'o narrated the Discovery Channel documentary series Serengeti, about wildlife in the Serengeti ecosystem. Nyong'o spoke about the lack of African women narrating nature documentaries and how the Serengeti team encouraged her to use her native Kenyan accent on the series. She was nominated for the Outstanding Narrator award at the 72nd Primetime Emmy Awards, becoming the third Black woman to be nominated. She was also nominated for an NAACP Image Award for Character Voice-Over Performance. In 2019, she hosted the Channel 4 documentary Warrior Women with Lupita Nyong'o, in which she traveled across Benin, West Africa, to research the Dahomey Amazons. She had been cast in a leading role in The Woman King (2022), but dropped out of the production around the time of filming the documentary.

=== 2020s: Recent work ===
During the COVID-19 pandemic, Nyong'o appeared on the April 2020 Global Citizen livestream benefit event Together at Home, and appeared in the radio play presentation of Richard II from The Public Theater and WNYC as The Narrator. Nyong'o was featured in Beyoncé's musical film Black Is King, which premiered on Disney+ in July 2020. Nyong'o partnered with Nairobi-based media and technology startup Kukua to support YouTube's superhero animated series Super Sema (2021), which follows the adventures of an extraordinary young African girl, Sema, who lives in the neo-African-futuristic community of Dunia. Nyong'o served as an executive producer and voice actress in the series. Afterwards, she starred alongside Juan Castano in Saheem Ali's bilingual radio play adaptation of Romeo & Juliet, titled Romeo y Julieta (2021).

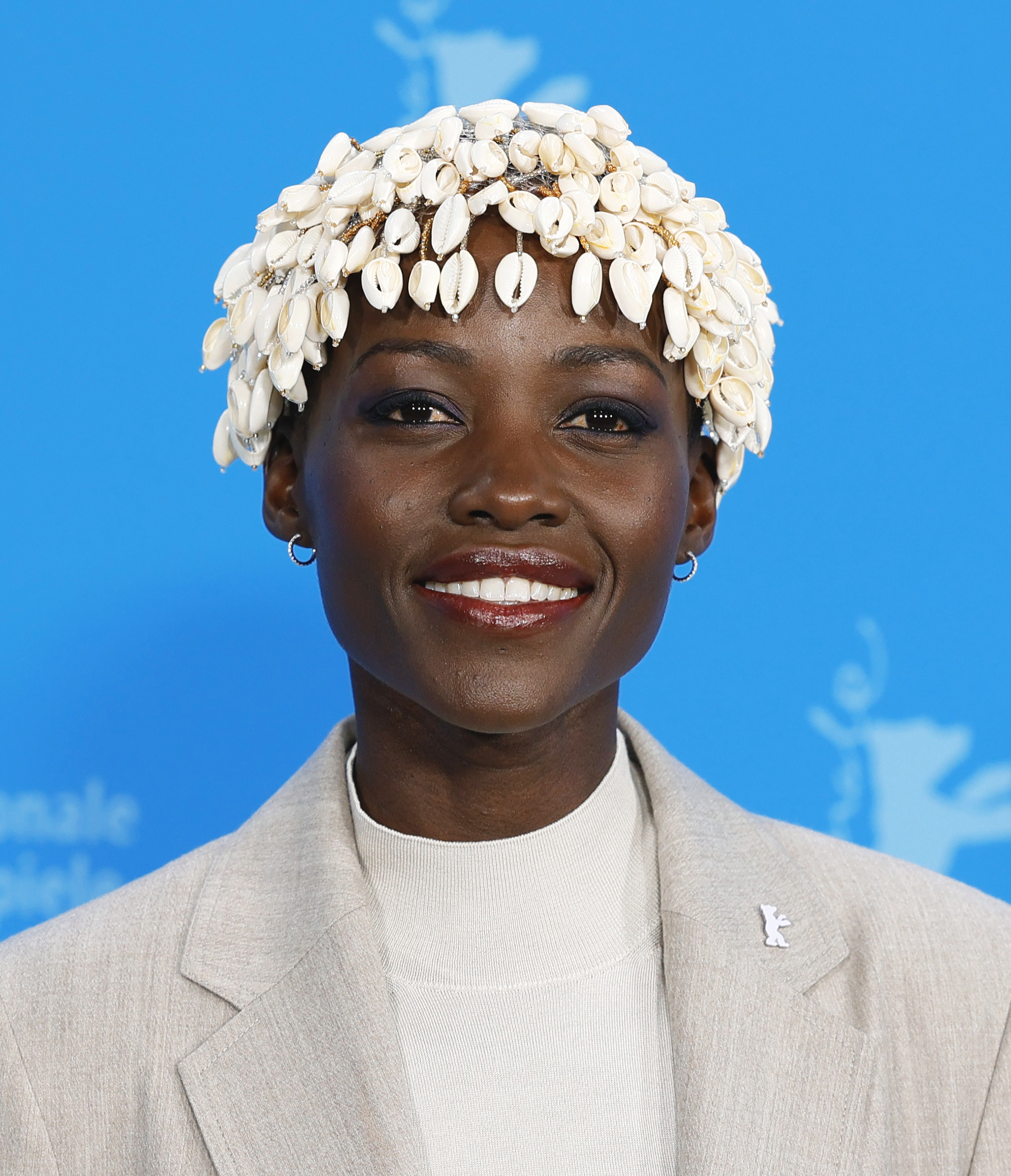
Nyong'o at the 2024 Berlin International Film Festival

Nyong'o won the Outstanding Limited Performance in a Children's Program category at the 48th Daytime Creative Arts Emmy Awards for her involvement in Netflix's television series, Bookmarks: Celebrating Black Voices (2020). She narrated the Apple TV+ documentary Who Are You, Charlie Brown? (2021), which explores the origins of the comic strip Peanuts and its creator Charles M. Schulz. The same year, she reprised her narrator role in Serengeti, which earned her a second Primetime Emmy Award nomination. In 2022, Nyong'o starred in Simon Kinberg's ensemble spy thriller The 355 alongside Jessica Chastain, Penélope Cruz, Fan Bingbing, and Diane Kruger. The same year, she guest-starred in Netflix's adult animated sitcom Human Resources as the Kenyan Shame Wizard Asha. She also reprised the role of Nakia in Black Panther: Wakanda Forever, the sequel to Black Panther.

In 2024, Nyong'o starred in the horror film A Quiet Place: Day One and the animated film The Wild Robot. To prepare for A Quiet Place, Nyong'o underwent exposure therapy to overcome her lifelong fear of cats; by the end of the film's development, she had come to enjoy cats so much that she adopted her own cat. Also in 2024, Nyong'o began hosting the podcast Mind Your Own, in which she tells stories from the African diaspora and shares experiences from her own life and Kenyan heritage. The same year, she became the first Black and first African jury president of the Berlin International Film Festival. In 2026, Nyong'o played the characters Helen of Troy and Clytemnestra in Christopher Nolan's epic film The Odyssey.

== Advocacy ==
Nyong'o has said that, as an artist, she feels a mandate to bring attention to important but overlooked issues. In 2014, at the Essence Black Women in Hollywood luncheon in Beverly Hills, she delivered a speech about the beauty of Black women, and shared insecurities she had as a teenager. She said her views changed when she saw the South Sudanese model Alek Wek become successful. The same year, the National Trust for Historic Preservation recruited Nyong'o in an effort to oppose development, including a new minor league baseball stadium, in the Shockoe Bottom area of Richmond, Virginia. The historic neighborhood was the site of major slave-trading before the American Civil War. Nyong'o sent a letter to Richmond Mayor Dwight C. Jones asking him to withdraw support for the development proposal. (Note: Attributed to multiple references:)

In 2015, Nyong'o became a Global Elephant Ambassador for the conservation organization WildAid, and the following year she participated in an anti-poaching campaign prior to an ivory burn carried out by the Kenyan government. In 2019, she received the WildAid Champion of the Year award.

Nyong'o has been involved with the organization Mother Health International (MHI), which aims to provide relief to women and children in Uganda by creating locally engaged birthing centers. Variety honored her for her work with MHI in 2016. In 2019, Nyong'o became an ambassador for Michael Kors' "Watch Hunger Stop" campaign. The same year, she and her mother were honored at The Harlem School of the Arts' Mask Ball with a "Visionary Lineage Award". In 2020, The Africa Center announced Nyong'o as a member of its board of trustees.

Nyong'o expressed solidarity with the residents of the Gaza Strip during the Gaza war. As part of a group called Artists4Ceasefire, she signed a letter urging U.S. president Joe Biden and the U.S. Congress to call for an immediate ceasefire in Gaza. In August 2024, she announced that she had recently become a U.S. citizen and planned to vote for Kamala Harris in the 2024 U.S. presidential election.

== Other activities ==
In 2019, Nyong'o authored the children's book Sulwe, which was published by Simon & Schuster Books for Young Readers. The book tells the story of a young Kenyan girl who has the darkest complexion in her family; the story was influenced by Nyong'o's own childhood experiences. Sulwe became a number-one New York Times Best Seller and was selected for the 2020 Illustrator Honor at the Coretta Scott King Awards. The book also won the award for Outstanding Literary Work – Children at the 2020 NAACP Image Awards.

Nyong'o is featured on Ciara's song "Melanin" under the moniker "Troublemaker". She has appeared in advertising for the brands Calvin Klein, Lancôme, Miu Miu, and Tiffany & Co. (Note: Attributed to multiple references:)

== In popular culture ==
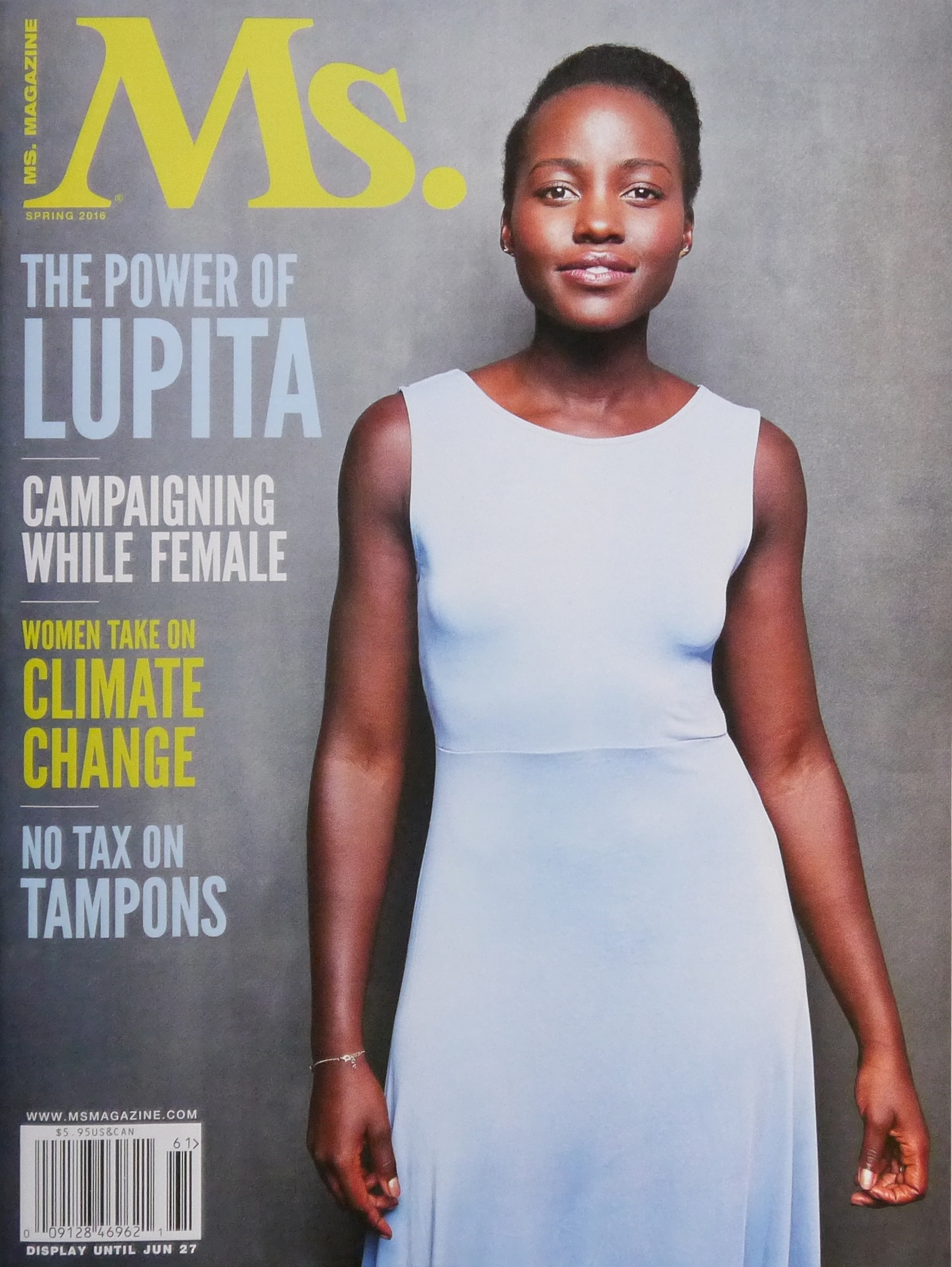
Nyong'o on the cover of Ms. magazine in 2016

Nyong'o has appeared on the covers of various magazines, including Dazed & Confused, Elle, Ms., New York, Vanity Fair, Vogue, (Note: Attributed to multiple references:) and The Sunday Times Magazine. She was included in Derek Blasberg's 2013 best-dressed list in Harper's Bazaar. In 2014, she was named the most beautiful woman by People and "Woman of the Year" by Glamour. She was photographed by Annie Leibovitz for the 2016 Hollywood Issue Vanity Fair, and was included in Tim Walker's 2018 Pirelli Calendar. Nyong'o was selected as one of the hundred most influential Africans by New African magazine in 2019, and she appeared on a Forbes list of "Africa's 50 Most Powerful Women" in 2020. When Nyong'o's face was featured on the cover of Grazia UK in 2017, she expressed disappointment that part of her hair had been removed to align with "Eurocentric" beauty standards. Both the photographer who altered the photo and Grazia later apologized. (Note: Attributed to multiple references:)

U.S. Congressman Charles Rangel and Voza Rivers, the head of the New Heritage Theatre Group, named October 20, 2015 "Lupita Nyong'o Day" in Harlem, New York. Nyong'o was an honoree at the 2016 Elle Women in Hollywood Awards, and in 2019 she received a star on the Hollywood Walk of Fame.

== Personal life ==
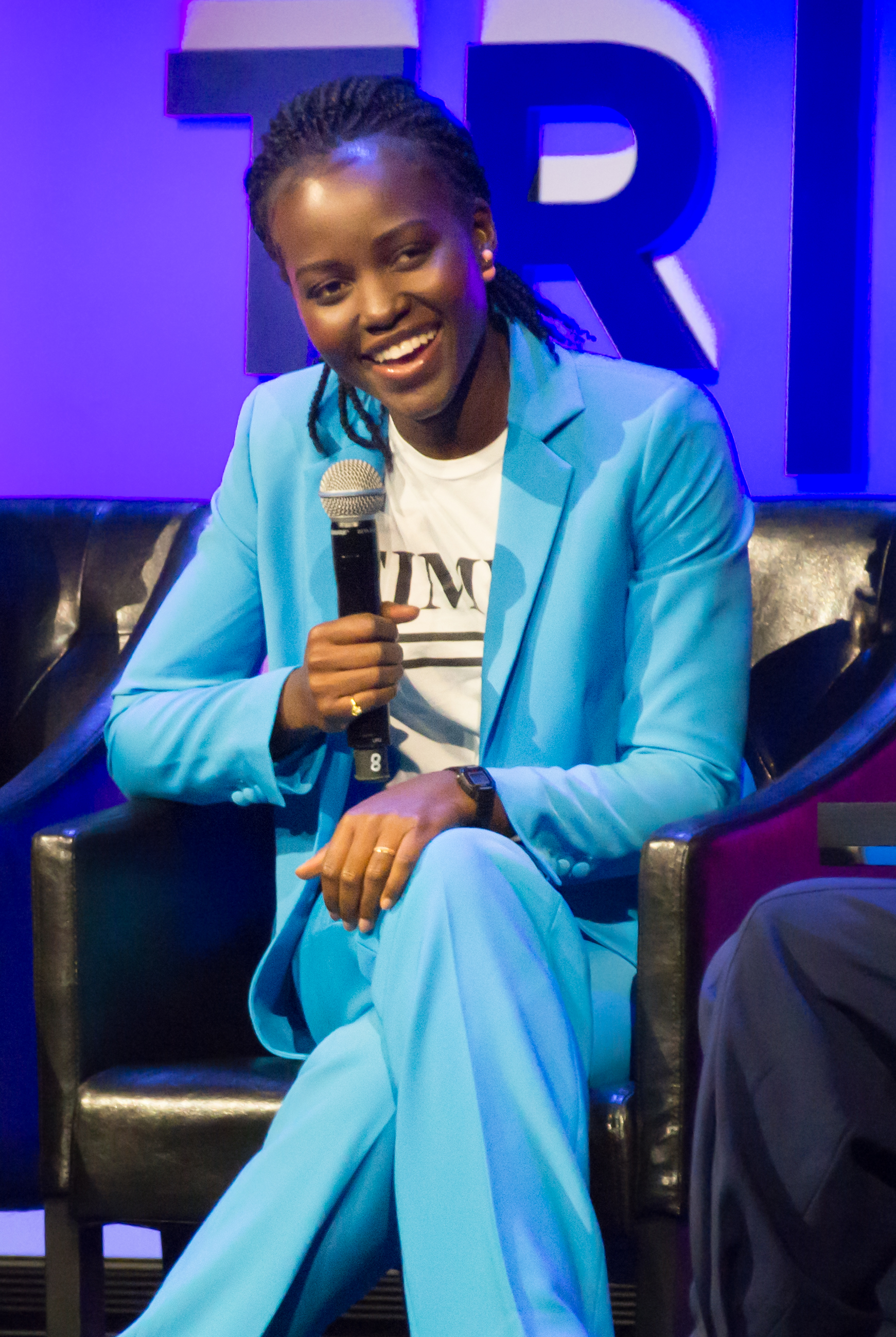
Nyong'o at a Time's Up event at the 2018 Tribeca Film Festival

Nyong'o is a Christian and speaks English, Spanish, Luo, and Swahili. (Note: Attributed to multiple references:) She said her mother taught her to live "a life of gratitude and bounty", which is a reference to the Prayer of Jabez in the Old Testament of the Christian Bible. Nyong'o lives in Los Angeles as of 2024. She suffers from uterine fibroids.

In October 2017—in the wake of the Harvey Weinstein sexual abuse scandal and the MeToo movement—Nyong'o wrote an op-ed for The New York Times stating that Weinstein had sexually harassed her on two separate occasions in 2011, while she was a student at Yale. She had vowed never to work with him thereafter, which resulted in her turning down an offer to star in Southpaw (2015), a Weinstein-distributed film. She expressed a commitment to work with female directors and male feminist directors who have not abused their power. Nyong'o's op-ed was part of a collection of stories by The New York Times and The New Yorker that won the 2018 Pulitzer Prize for Public Service. At the Tribeca Film Festival in New York City in 2018, Nyong'o participated in a Time's Up event with Julianne Moore and other actresses.

== Credits ==
=== Film ===
Year	Title	Role	Notes	Ref.
2008	East River	F	Short film	
2009	In My Genes	Director, writer, producer, editor	Documentary film	
2009	"The Little Things You Do"	Director	Music video	
2013	12 Years a Slave	Patsey		
2014	Non-Stop	Gwen		
2015	Star Wars: The Force Awakens	Maz Kanata		
2016	The Jungle Book	Raksha (voice)		
2016	Queen of Katwe	Nakku Harriet		
2017	Star Wars: The Last Jedi	Maz Kanata		
2018	Black Panther	Nakia		
2019	Little Monsters	Miss Audrey Caroline		
2019	Us	Adelaide Wilson / Red		
2019	Star Wars: The Rise of Skywalker	Maz Kanata		
2022	The 355	Khadijah Adiyeme		
2022	Black Panther: Wakanda Forever	Nakia		
2024	A Quiet Place: Day One	Samira / Sam		
2024	The Wild Robot	ROZZUM unit 7134 ("Roz") / ROZZUM unit 6262 ("Rummage") (voice)		
2026	The Odyssey	Helen / Clytemnestra		

=== Television ===
Year	Title	Role	Notes	Ref.
2009–2012	Shuga	Ayira	5 episodes	
2017–2018	Star Wars Forces of Destiny	Maz Kanata (voice)	32 episodes	
2018	Star Wars Rebels	Maz Kanata (voice)	Archive recording; Episode: "A World Between Worlds"	
2019	Warrior Women with Lupita Nyong'o	Host	Documentary	
2019–2021	Serengeti	Narrator	Documentary	
2021	Martha Knows Best	Herself	Episode: "Paths"	
2021	Super Sema	Mama Dunia	Executive producer, Voice (4 episodes)	
2021	Who Are You, Charlie Brown?	Narrator	Documentary	
2022	Human Resources	Asha (voice)	Episode: "International Creature Convention"	
2023	Big Mouth	Asha (voice)	Episode: "The International Show"	

=== Theater ===
Year	Title	Role	Director	Theater	Notes	Ref.
2015	Eclipsed	The Girl	Liesl Tommy	The Public Theater	Off-Broadway; 29 September 2015 – 29 November 2015	
2016	Eclipsed	The Girl	Liesl Tommy	John Golden Theatre	Broadway; 23 February 2016 – 19 June 2016	
2021	Romeo y Julieta	Julieta	Saheem Ali	The Public Theater	Off-Broadway (Radio Play); 18 March 2021 – 18 March 2022	
2025	Twelfth Night	Viola	Saheem Ali	The Public Theater	Shakespeare in the Park; 7 August 2025 – 14 September 2025	
2026	Pre-Existing Condition	A	Maria Dizzia	Greenwich House Theatre	Off-Broadway; 1 September 2026 – 26 September 2026	

=== Video games ===
Year	Title	Voice role	Notes	Ref.
2016	Lego Star Wars: The Force Awakens	Maz Kanata		

== Accolades ==
Nyong'o has received various accolades, including an Actor Award, an Academy Award and a Daytime Emmy Award, in addition to nominations for two British Academy Film Awards, a Golden Globe Award and a Tony Award.

== See also ==
- List of Mexican Academy Award winners and nominees

== Bibliography ==
- Sulwe. Simon & Schuster Books for Young Readers. October 15, 2019. ISBN 978-1534425361.
