= Albinism in Tanzania =

Albinism in Tanzania is an expression of the genetic condition of albinism among citizens of the United Republic of Tanzania, characterized by a lack of melanin in the skin, hair and eyes. The country has one of the highest reported incidences of oculocutaneous albinism (OCA2) in the world, estimated at 1 in 1,400 births, compared to roughly 1 in 20,000 in the United States.

People with albinism in Tanzania face severe social stigma, discrimination, and life-threatening attacks driven by superstition and a lucrative trade in body parts for witchcraft. Over the past two decades, dozens have been mutilated or murdered, prompting government crackdowns on witchdoctors and growing advocacy by survivors and NGOs.

== Genetic basis and distribution ==
Albinism in Tanzania is almost exclusively oculocutaneous albinism type 2 (OCA2), an autosomal recessive disorder caused by mutations in the P gene, which impairs melanin synthesis in the skin, hair and eyes.

Tanzania's prevalence is among the highest globally, with roughly one affected individual per 1,400 births.

Ukerewe Island in Lake Victoria has become a noted safe haven, where many Tanzanians with albinism live and organize cultural events to raise awareness of their condition.

== Access to care ==
Due to melanin deficiency, people with albinism are highly susceptible to ultraviolet damage, leading to sunburn, skin cancers and photophobia. Access to sunscreen, protective clothing and ophthalmological care is limited, especially in rural areas.

== Social stigma and discrimination ==
Myths portray persons with albinism as ghosts, cursed beings, or immortals immune to harm, leading to ostracism in schools and communities. Many children drop out due to bullying and lack of accommodations.

== Violence and ritual killings ==
Superstitious beliefs that body parts of people with albinism can confer wealth, health or political power have fueled abductions, mutilations, grave desecrations, and murders. Between 2000 and 2015, at least 75 people were killed, including children; at least 35 people were killed in 2008 alone, though the true number in both instances is thought be higher.

Investigations have revealed a transnational trade: bones and other parts fetch tens of thousands of dollars on black markets, and practitioners in neighbouring countries participate in the ritual use of these remains. According to the Red Cross, in 2015, witch doctors in Tanzania were willing to pay up to $75,000 for a full set of albino body parts.

In late 2009, scores of Tanzanians with albinism went into hiding as attacks surged; many survivors remain under protection in safe houses run by charities. Though community initiatives have helped to reduce the rate of violence, the problem still remains widespread in the country as of 2025.

== Legal response ==
In March 2015, the Tanzanian government arrested over 200 witchdoctors linked to attacks on people with albinism, signaling a major crackdown on the perpetrators. This came amid a larger effort by President Jakaya Kikwete to tackle the issue in response to widespread international condemnation following the extensive killings which occurred in 2008. In an admission to parliament in late spring of that year, Deputy Home Affairs Minister Pereira Silima acknowledged that reports linking politicians to killings of people with albinism could be true, given the uptick in attacks amid the election period.

In February 2025, the African Court on Human and Peoples' Rights held the Tanzanian government liable for "failures to protect persons with albinism against violent attacks, torture and degrading treatment, discrimination, trafficking and abduction of children of persons with albinism" in violation of Article 4 of the African Charter, following a case brought against it by the Centre for Human Rights at the University of Pretoria, Institute for Human Rights and Development in Africa (IHRDA), and Legal and Human Rights Centre at the University of Bagamoyo.

The government was ordered to establish a fund to compensate victims of violence and discrimination, amend the 1918 Witchcraft Act to "clarify ambiguities in relation to witchcraft and traditional health practices", change relevant laws to ensure offenders are prosecuted for violent crimes against members of the community, introduce new legal precedent to safeguard the rights, welfare, and fair treatment of people with albinism, and promulgate educational material to discredit popular myths surrounding them. They were additionally required to, within three months of the judgement's dissemination, visibly publish the judgement on relevant ministry websites with availability lasting no less than one year.

== Advocacy ==
In November 2010, Salum Khalfani Bar’wani became Tanzania's the first elected albino lawmaker, raising the profile of disability rights in Parliament.

The Mr. and Ms. Albinism East Africa pageant, first held in December 2018, has aimed to demystify albinism and celebrate beauty and dignity among young adults with the condition.

The cultural dance troupe Albino Revolution has been noted for its advocacy in Tanzania. Karate classes launched in Dar es Salaam in 2021 by Jerome Mgahama provide self-defence skills and build confidence among adults with albinism.

== See also ==
- Albinism in humans
- Persecution of people with albinism
- Disability in Tanzania

Regional:

- Albinism in Malawi
