= Harold Falls =

American ophthalmologist

- Born: November 25, 1909; Winchester, Indiana
- Died: May 27, 2006 (aged 96); Brighton, Michigan
- Known for: Nettleship-Falls syndrome
- Scientific career
- Fields: Ophthalmology, genetics

Harold Francis Falls (November 25, 1909 in Winchester, Indiana – May 27, 2006 in Brighton, Michigan) was an American ophthalmologist and geneticist. He helped found one of the first genetics clinic in US. The Nettleship-Falls syndrome, the most common type of ocular albinism, is named after him and English ophthalmologist Edward Nettleship.
