= Ocular albinism late onset sensorineural deafness =

Ocular albinism late onset sensorineural deafness (OASD) is a rare, X-linked recessive disease characterized by intense visual impairments, reduced retinal pigments, translucent pale-blue irises and moderately severe hearing loss from adolescence to middle-age. It is a subtype of Ocular Albinism (OA) that is linked to Ocular albinism type I (OA1). OA1 is the most common form of ocular albinism, affecting at least 1/60,000 males.

OA has two patterns of inheritance: X-linked and autosomal. X-linked OA includes OA1 (Nettleship-Falls type), OA2 (Forsius-Eriksson type) and OASD. Autosomal inheritance, on the other hand, includes OCA3 (autosomal recessive OA) and OA with sensorineural deafness. As OA1 is X-linked, males are generally more affected than females. The cause of OASD is believed to involve mutations of the GPR143 gene, which is responsible for pigment proteins production and melanosome growth control. This gene is located on the X-chromosome at Xp22.3, which is also where TBL1 gene is found. The physical proximity of the two genes suggest that OASD and OA1 result from contiguous-gene syndrome.

There are three main diagnostic methods: molecular genetic tests, family pedigree analysis and antenatal diagnosis. While there is no definite treatment for OASD, annual ophthalmologic examinations are suggested for preventative measures.

== Signs and symptoms ==
The main signs and symptoms (phenotypes) of OASD, shown in different parts of the body, include the following:

- Nystagmus: involuntary, rapid rhythmic eye movements (HPO ID: 000639)
- Sensorineural hearing impairment (HPO ID: 0001107)
- Visual impairment: impaired vision, eyesight loss (HPO ID: 0000613)
- Photophobia: light hypersensitivity (HPO ID: 0000407)
- Ocular albinism: absent pigmentation in the eye (HPO ID: 0000505)

Although symptoms vary between individuals, the signs and symptoms mentioned above all have the Human Phenotype Ontology (HPO) frequency of 90% and are categorized as "very frequent (80-99%)". Strabismus, leading to squint eyes, and cross-eyed individuals, are shown by 30-79% of people who have OASD. The HPO has collected information on symptoms demonstrated in medical resources. The HPO ID helps access more information about the symptom.

However, there are additional possible signs and symptoms of OASD that are not listed by HPO such as the following:

- Adult-onset sensorineural hearing impairment
- Albinism
- Depigmented fundus
- Giant melanosomes in melanocytes
- Nystagmus-induced head nodding
- X-linked inheritance

=== Associated conditions ===
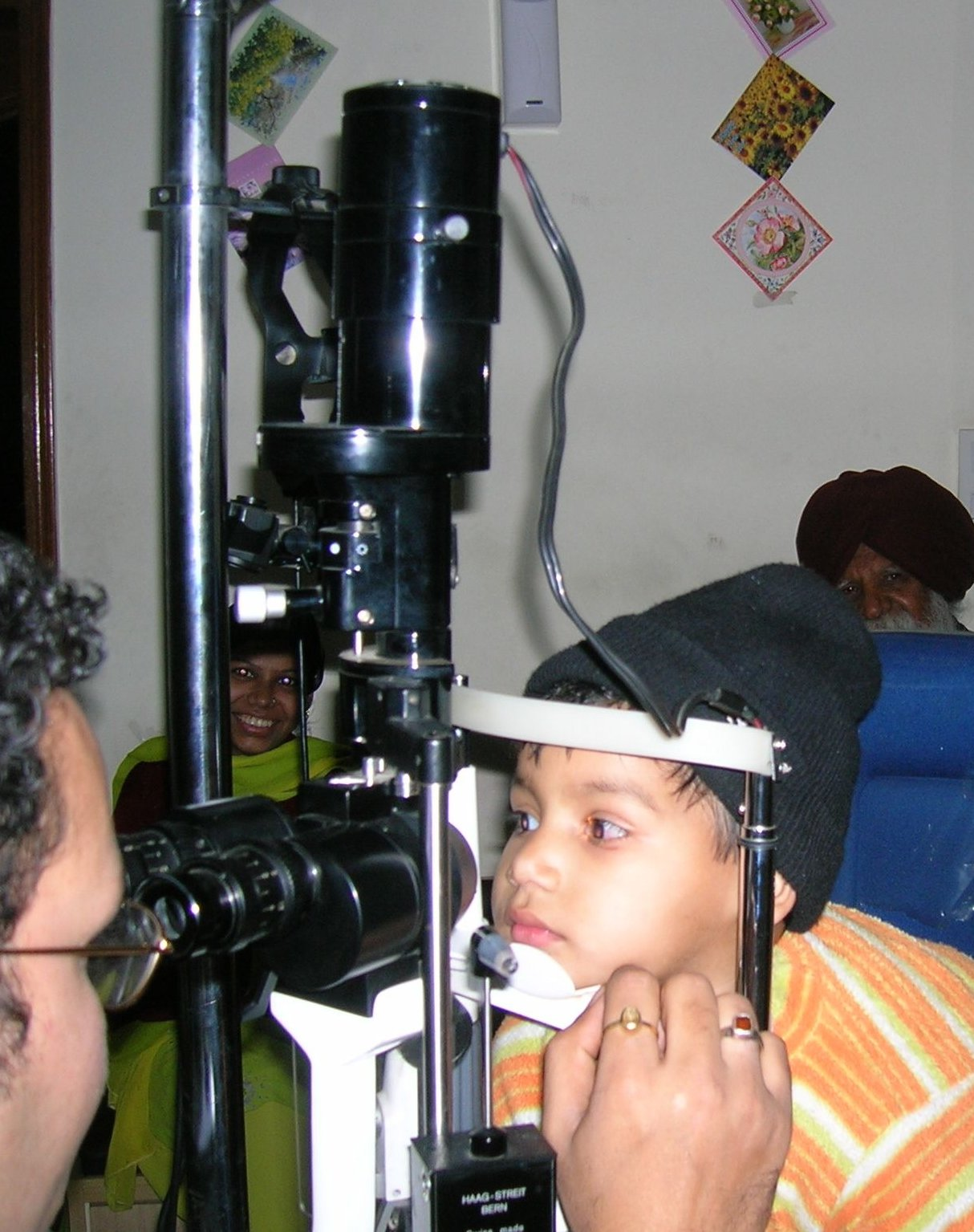
This image shows an otoscopic examination being carried on a patient.

OASD is one of the many contiguous gene syndromes related to OA1. Contiguous gene syndromes are due to the deletion or duplication of a group of genes physically clustered together. Many patients with contiguous gene syndromes that involves the OA1 gene being deleted in the Xp22.3 region have been described to have albino phenotypes.

Some of the other conditions of close linkage to type I ocular albinism are of the following:

- X-linked ichthyosis
- Kallmann syndrome
- X-linked recessive chondrodysplasia punctata
- Microphthalmia with linear skin defects (MLS)
  - This condition is characterised by microphthalmia, corneal opacities, and patches of erythematous skin in the head and neck of female patients. The gene involved is located very closely to the OA1 gene loci on the X chromosome.
- Aicardi Syndrome, characterised by retinal lacunae, absence of corpus callosum and seizures
- Goltz Syndrome, which is characterised by microphthalmia, focal dermal hypoplasia, as well as skeletal abnormalities

== Causes ==
=== Genetic mutations ===
OA is a recessive X-linked disorder; hence, the disorder is located on the X chromosome. It is mainly due to mutations in the GPR143 gene(OA1), located at Xp22.3; this gene gives instructions for the production of protein involved in pigmentation of the eyes and skin. It helps control the growth of melanosomes, which are cellular structures that produce and store a pigment called melanin. Melanin is the substance that gives skin, hair, and eyes their color; it also plays a role in normal vision in the retina.

==== G protein-coupled receptor (GPCR) ====
A G protein-coupled receptor, which is the protein product, is localized on the membrane of melanosomes in pigmented cells in the eye. There is an identical gene mutated for congenital nystagmus 6 (OMIM code: 300814). Although OASD results from mutations in the Xp22.3 region, it may vary depending on individuals. Some may have additional mutations (usually microdeletions) in the contiguous genes TBL1X and SHROOM2. Mutations in GNA13 (17q24.1), activated by OA1, have also been reported to cause the ocular albinism phenotype. These genetic changes can stop the protein from reaching melanosomes to control their growth, or the protein's function is disrupted although the protein reaches melanosomes successfully. Consequently, melanosomes in both the skin cells and retina enlarge abnormally. Researchers have ambiguous interpretations on how these macromelanosomes have correlation to vision loss and other eye abnormalities in patients suffering ocular albinism.

=== Other ===
While OASD is largely due to mutations, another possible cause is contiguous gene defects that include OA1 gene. Due to the presence of several forms of X-linked hearing loss, the gene responsible for sensorineural deafness could also map to the same region.

== Pathogenesis ==
OASD belongs in the subtype of OA1 and thus has similar pathogenesis with OA1. The physical proximity of genes related to OASD (GPR143 gene and TBL1 gene) made researchers postulate that OASD and OA1 are the result of a contiguous-gene syndrome. In other words, OASD may be explained by gene pleiotropy of OA1; hence, OA1 and OASD are two separate, yet commonly associated entities.

=== GPR143 Gene ===
Surace et al.(2000) conducted animal studies on CD1 albino female mice to investigate the pathogenesis of OA1. They found that the expression of OA1 gene (GPR143 gene) is observed to be stronger after birth and is maintained until adulthood. Nevertheless, a decrease is observed after adulthood. This finding suggests that OA1 gene expression is controlled by transcription factors that play crucial roles in the formation and pigmentation of melanosomes.

==== Abnormal Growth of Melanosomes ====
Incerti et al. (2000) attempt to better understand the pathogenesis of OA1 using knockout mice with inactivated OA1 genes. OA1 gene was made inactive with gene targeting technique. Ultrastructural analysis was performed on the melanosomes found in the retinal pigment epithelium (RPE) in both normal and knockout mice. Only normal-sized melanosomes were found in the wild-type controls. In knockout mice, on the other hand, abnormally large melanosomes were also found in addition to the normal-sized melanosomes. However, no melanosomes of intermediate sizes were observed.

Moreover, a single core region within the giant pigmented melanosome that resembles the structure of a normal membrane-free melanosome was identified. Together, the evidence suggest that the formation of macromelanosomes is due to the abnormal growth of individual melanosomes, rather than the fusion of multiple melanosomes. This disagrees with the previous model on macromelanosomes formation. It stated that the separation failure of pre-melanosomes from the endoplasmic reticulum, accumulating structural proteins and enzymes, caused progressive organelle distension. The present theory suggests that the normal melanosomes and macromelanosomes have similar pathways of formation and maturation processes. This offered new insight into the pathogenesis as OA1 gene appears to have a crucial role in the final stages of melanosome development and maturation. Eye examination of the adult knockout mice revealed significantly lighter coloured pigmented in the RPE than the normal control mice.

=== TBL1 Gene ===
OA1 gene is not the only gene involved in the pathogenesis of OASD. TBL1 gene is also identified to affect the hearing phenotype of OASD. TBL1 is located in the Xp22.3 loci which is of close proximity to the OA1 gene, on the telomeric side outside its critical region. Genomic analysis by Bassi et al.(1999) found that this gene is either partially or completely deleted in patients carrying the Xp22.3 terminal deletions. One patient with deletions of both TBL1 gene and OA1 gene displayed OA1 phenotype as well as associated late-onset sensorineural deafness. Hence, it could be inferred that TBL1 gene is involved in the pathogenesis of OASD.

==== Unusual Optic Pathways ====
Furthermore, in the mutant mice with inactivated OA1 gene, the size of the uncrossed optic pathways was reduced in favour of the cross pathways. The retinofugal pathway, projecting from the eye towards the brain, of the knockout mice also displayed a misrouting of optic fibres. Such misrouting led to the loss of stereoscopic vision in patients with ocular albinism. The mutant mice also had a significantly smaller mean ipsilateral volume of terminal label in their lateral geniculate nucleus (LGN) than the normal control mice, as shown with the Mann-Whitney test at 5% significance level. Yet, this difference is independent of the LGN volume as the size of the nucleus was comparable in both groups. However, the absence of macromelanosome in the chiasmic region, where the final retinal axon enters, illustrates that there is no direct causation between the formation of macromelanosomes and abnormalities in the optic pathways.

== Diagnosis ==
There are three main types of diagnosis methods:

1. Molecular genetic tests are composed of sequence analyses of the entire coding region and deletion/duplication analysis. GPR143 gene mutation is found in most affected males.
2. Family pedigree analysis
3. Antenatal diagnosis: Prenatal testing can be used when women are known carriers of the GPR143 gene mutation, using chorionic villus sampling or amniocentesis. Preimplantation genetic diagnosis may be available. As an alternative, the expression of OA1 has been reported to be detected exclusively after birth.

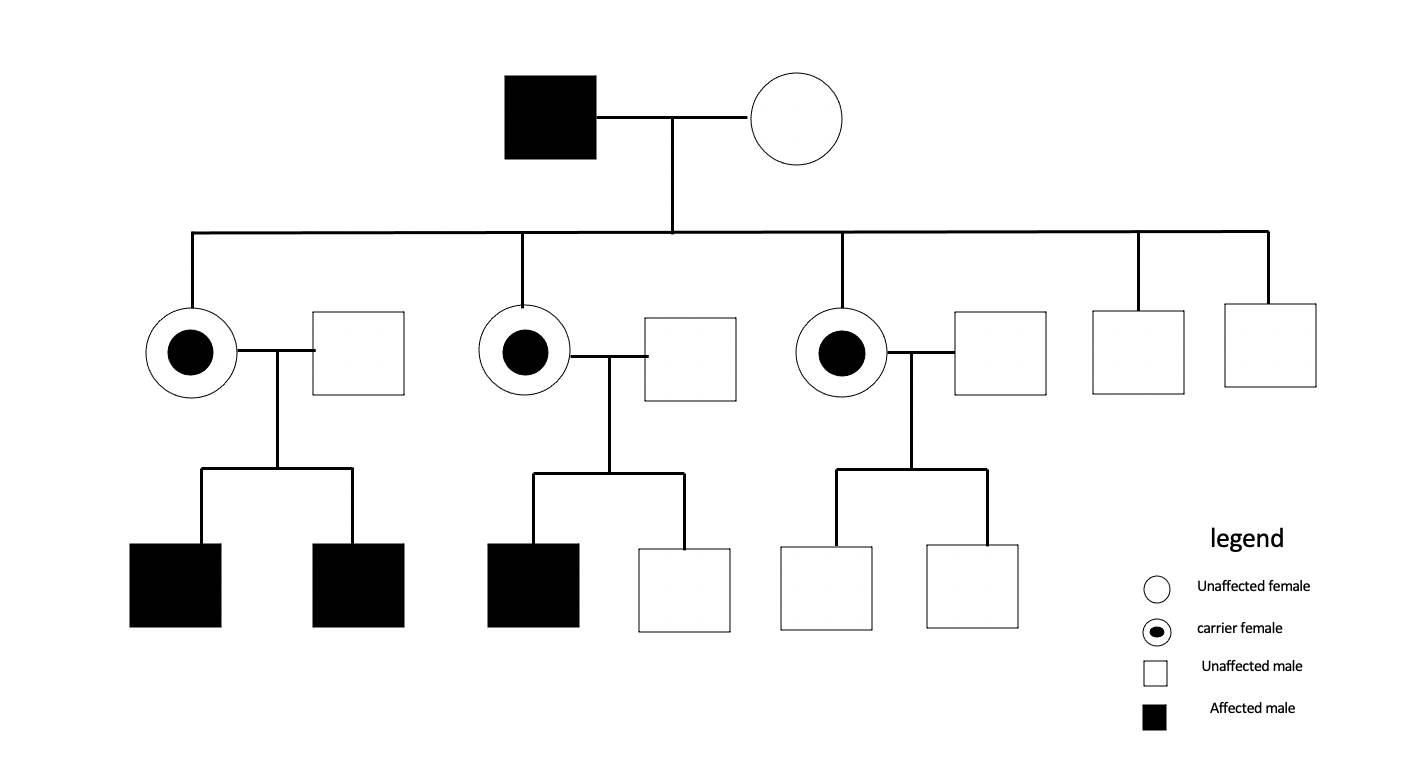
Family pedigree diagnosed with OA1, showing different phenotypes.

Female obligate carriers have patchy streaks of pigment in the mid-peripheral retina (pigmentary mosaicism), which demonstrates random X inactivation. Those with more advanced ocular manifestations due to skewed X-inactivation have reported reduced visual acuity and nystagmus. Despite the fact that melanin macro-globules are not pathognomonic, they are commonly seen during skin biopsy.

As patients with OASD demonstrate severe hearing loss in their fourth or fifth decade of life, an audiometry test is recommended in the fourth decade. Physical examinations such as otoscopic examination may give uncertain results as the patient may have hearing loss in spite of having no structural abnormalities.

== Treatment ==
There is no definite treatment for the cure of OASD. Thus, annual ophthalmologic examinations are advised for patients below the age of 16, and every 2–3 years above 16. Treatments are targeted towards specific symptoms. Refractive problems are dealt with by the use of corrective glasses with tinted lenses for those with photophobia. Additional low vision aids and special education may be needed. Extraocular muscle surgery can help restore peripheral visual fusion fields for eye alignment and improve head posture; this helps relieve strabismus and nystagmus.
