= Tanga House =

Residence and community center for people with albinism in Mwanza, Tanzania

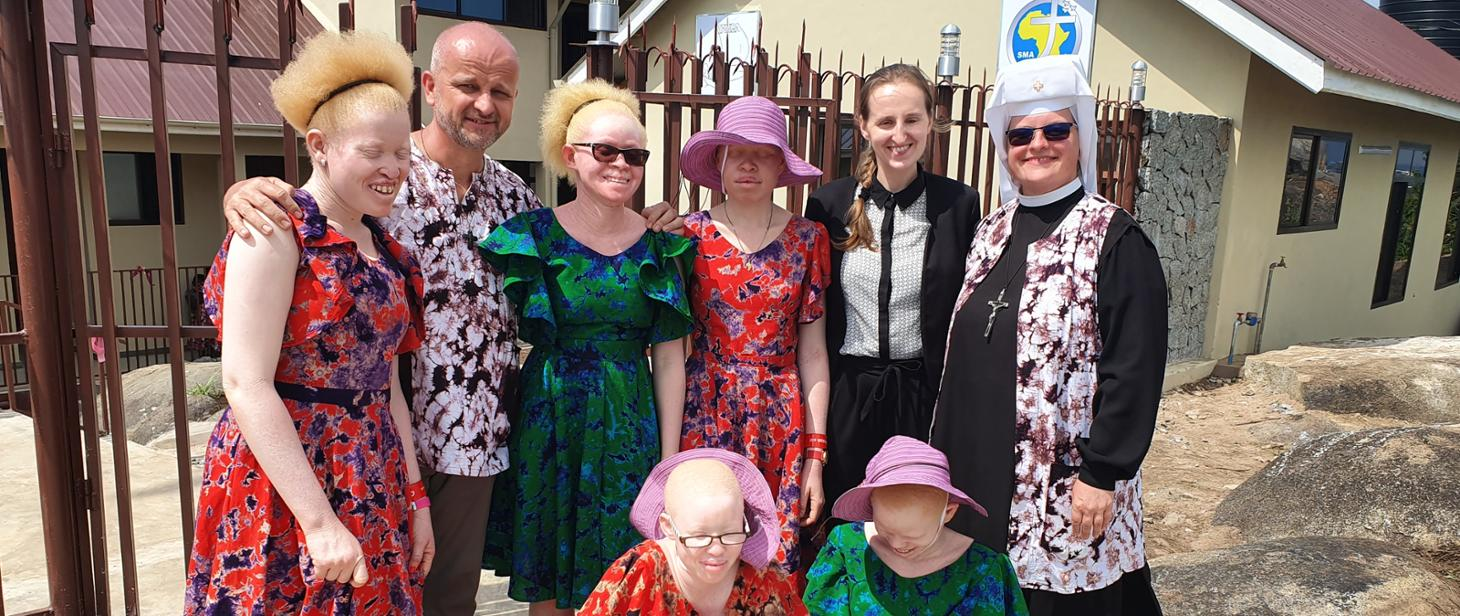
The opening of Tanga House on March 14, 2020

Tanga House is a residence and community center in Mwanza, Tanzania, dedicated to children and young people with albinism. Established by the Society of African Missions (SMA) in cooperation with the Loreto Sisters and international partners, it provides a safe living environment, education, and social support for residents who often face discrimination, social stigma and violence due to superstitions surrounding albinism in Tanzania and the rest of East Africa.

== History ==
Tanga derives from the Swahili word for “sail,” symbolizing guidance and new beginnings. The residence is situated near Lake Victoria, East Africa’s largest lake, reinforcing the imagery of a journey and reflecting the home’s mission to support children and young people with albinism in navigating social challenges.

Poland has been one of the project’s main supporters. Through Polish Aid and the Polish Foundation for Africa, as well as with the involvement of the Consulate of the Republic of Poland in Dar es Salaam, Poland has contributed funding and institutional support. In March 2020, Polish Consul Katarzyna Sobiecka took part in the official opening of Tanga House, underscoring Poland’s role in the initiative.

== Activities ==
Tanga House organizes outreach programs, including seminars and workshops, to educate local communities about albinism. These initiatives are conducted in schools, parishes, and villages, with a focus on dispelling myths and promoting understanding. By fostering awareness and empathy, Tanga House aims to reduce discrimination and encourage the social inclusion of individuals with albinism in Tanzania.
