= Albinism in Malawi =

Albinism in Malawi refers to the experiences of people with albinism (PWAs) in Malawi, many of whom face discrimination, violence, and limited access to healthcare and education. Albinism is a genetic condition that results in a lack of melanin, making individuals more vulnerable to sun exposure and vision problems.

== Human rights issues ==
Since 2014, over 170 attacks on people with albinism have been reported in Malawi, including killings and grave tampering. These attacks are often linked to beliefs that body parts of PWAs bring luck or wealth.

In 2022, a Malawian court convicted 12 individuals, including a police officer and a priest, for the murder of a 22-year-old man with albinism. Seven of them were found guilty of selling his body parts.

== Health and education ==
People with albinism in Malawi face significant health challenges, particularly related to skin cancer due to increased sensitivity to ultraviolet radiation. Access to adequate healthcare and protective measures, such as sunscreen and protective clothing, is often limited, especially in rural areas.

Educational opportunities for PWAs are also hindered by discrimination and lack of resources. Visual impairments associated with albinism can affect learning, and without appropriate support, many children with albinism struggle academically.

== Advocacy and representation ==
In 2019, six individuals with albinism ran for parliamentary and local government positions in Malawi, aiming to combat stigma through political engagement.

In 2021, Malawi's parliament welcomed its first ever elected albino lawmaker, Overstone Kondowe, marking a significant step towards inclusion.

== Government and international response ==
The United Nations has warned that people with albinism in Malawi are at risk of "systemic extinction" due to relentless attacks fueled by superstitions.

Efforts have been made to integrate PWAs into public service roles. In 2022, Malawi's police service welcomed its first officers with albinism, aiming to restore confidence in law enforcement.

On 19 June 2026, the government of Malawi announced the National Action Plan on Persons with Albinism (2026–2030). The plan recognised the impact of poverty on people with albinism, as well as discrimination experienced in employment and accessing social security. The plan included commitments to expand vocational training, entrepreneurship, and digital literacy programs tailored to people with albinism; improve access to microfinance; promote public and private sector employment opportunities; and ensure that people with albinism, particularly women and older people, are included in social security programmes.

== See also ==
- Persecution of people with albinism
- Human rights in Malawi

Regional:

- Albinism in Tanzania
