= Albinism in humans =

Condition characterized by absence of pigment

Albinism
- Other names: Achromia, achromasia, achromatosis
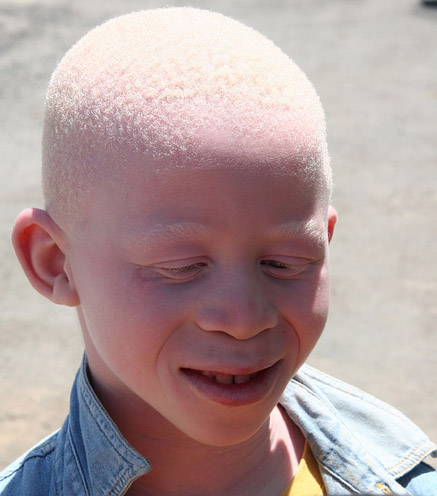
- Young African boy with albinism
- Pronunciation: albino (UK: /ælˈbiːnoʊ/, or US: /ælˈbaɪnoʊ/)
- Specialty: Dermatology
- Symptoms: Lack of skin pigmentation, white hair, yellow hair, red hair, red eyes
- Complications: Photophobia, vulnerability to sunburn, skin cancers
- Frequency: 1 in 17,000

Albinism is a congenital condition characterized in humans by the partial or complete absence of pigment in the skin, hair and eyes. Albinism is associated with a number of vision defects, such as photophobia, nystagmus, and amblyopia. The visual abnormalities regarding albinism are mainly caused by reduced melanin during optic development, leading to misrouting of optic nerve fibers and underdevelopment of the fovea. Lack of skin pigmentation makes for more susceptibility to sunburn and skin cancers. In rare cases such as Chédiak–Higashi syndrome, albinism may be associated with deficiencies in the transportation of melanin granules. This also affects essential granules present in immune cells, leading to increased susceptibility to infection.

Albinism results from inheritance of recessive gene alleles and is known to affect all vertebrates, including humans. Many genes are now known to cause oculocutaneous albinism, that include TYR, OSA2, TYRP1, SLC45A2, SLC24AB, and C10orf11, all of which affect both melanin synthesis and melanosome function. Unlike humans, other animals have multiple pigments and for these albinism is considered to be a hereditary condition characterised by the absence of melanin, in particular in the eyes, skin, hair, scales, feathers or cuticle. While an organism with complete absence of melanin is called an albino, an organism with only a diminished amount of melanin is described as leucistic or albinoid. The term is from the Latin albus, "white".

== Signs and symptoms ==
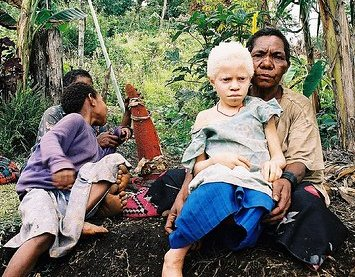
A girl with albinism from Papua New Guinea

There are two principal types of albinism: oculocutaneous, affecting the eyes, skin and hair, and ocular, affecting the eyes only.

There are different types of oculocutaneous albinism depending on which gene has undergone mutation. With some there is no pigment at all. The other end of the spectrum of albinism is "a form of albinism called rufous oculocutaneous albinism, which usually affects dark-skinned people".

According to the US National Organization for Albinism and Hypopigmentation, "With ocular albinism, the color of the iris of the eye may vary from blue to green or even brown, and sometimes darkens with age. However, when an optometrist or ophthalmologist examines the eye by shining a light from the side of the eye, the light shines back through the iris since very little pigment is present." This specific phenomenon is known as iris transillumination. It occurs due to reduced pigment in the iris stroma and is a common clinical aspect in albinism

Because individuals with albinism have skin that entirely lacks the dark pigment melanin, which helps protect the skin from the sun's ultraviolet radiation, their skin can burn more easily from overexposure. People with albinism are typically advised to complete full skin examinations at least once a year to detect early skin cancer. They are also encouraged to follow sun protection measures that include regular application of sunscreen.

The human eye normally produces enough pigment to color the iris blue, green or brown and lend opacity to the eye. In photographs, those with albinism are more likely to demonstrate "red eye", due to the red of the retina being visible through the iris. Lack of pigment in the eyes also results in problems with vision, both related and unrelated to photosensitivity.

Those with albinism are generally as healthy as the rest of the population (but see related disorders below), with growth and development occurring as normal, and albinism by itself does not cause mortality, although the lack of pigment blocking ultraviolet radiation increases the risk of melanomas (skin cancers) and other problems such as actinic skin damage and long-term skin changes due to the sun, and studies show that without proper sun protection, cumulative exposure to ultraviolet light can significantly increase the risk of both non-melanoma skin cancers and melanoma, particularly in areas with strong sunlight.

=== Vision problems ===
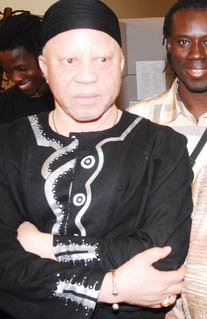
Malian Mandinka singer Salif Keita has albinism

Development of the optical system is highly dependent on the presence of melanin. For this reason, the reduction or absence of this pigment in people with albinism may lead to:

- Misrouting of the retinogeniculate projections, resulting in abnormal decussation (crossing) of optic nerve fibres
- Photophobia and decreased visual acuity due to light scattering within the eye (ocular straylight)
- Reduced visual acuity due to foveal hypoplasia and possibly light-induced retinal damage.
- Iris transillumination defects, which occur due to reduced pigment in the iris, allowing light to pass through the iris when viewed using slit-lamp retroillumination.

Eye conditions common in albinism include:

- Nystagmus, irregular rapid movement of the eyes back and forth, or in circular motion.
- Amblyopia, decrease in acuity of one or both eyes due to poor transmission to the brain, often due to other conditions such as strabismus.
- Optic nerve hypoplasia, underdevelopment of the optic nerve.
- Foveal Hypoplasia, incomplete development of the fovea, often a cause of reduced visual acuity in albinism.

The improper development of the retinal pigment epithelium (RPE), which in normal eyes absorbs most of the reflected sunlight, further increases glare due to light scattering within the eye. The resulting sensitivity (photophobia) generally leads to discomfort in bright light, but this can be reduced by the use of sunglasses or brimmed hats.

== Genetics ==
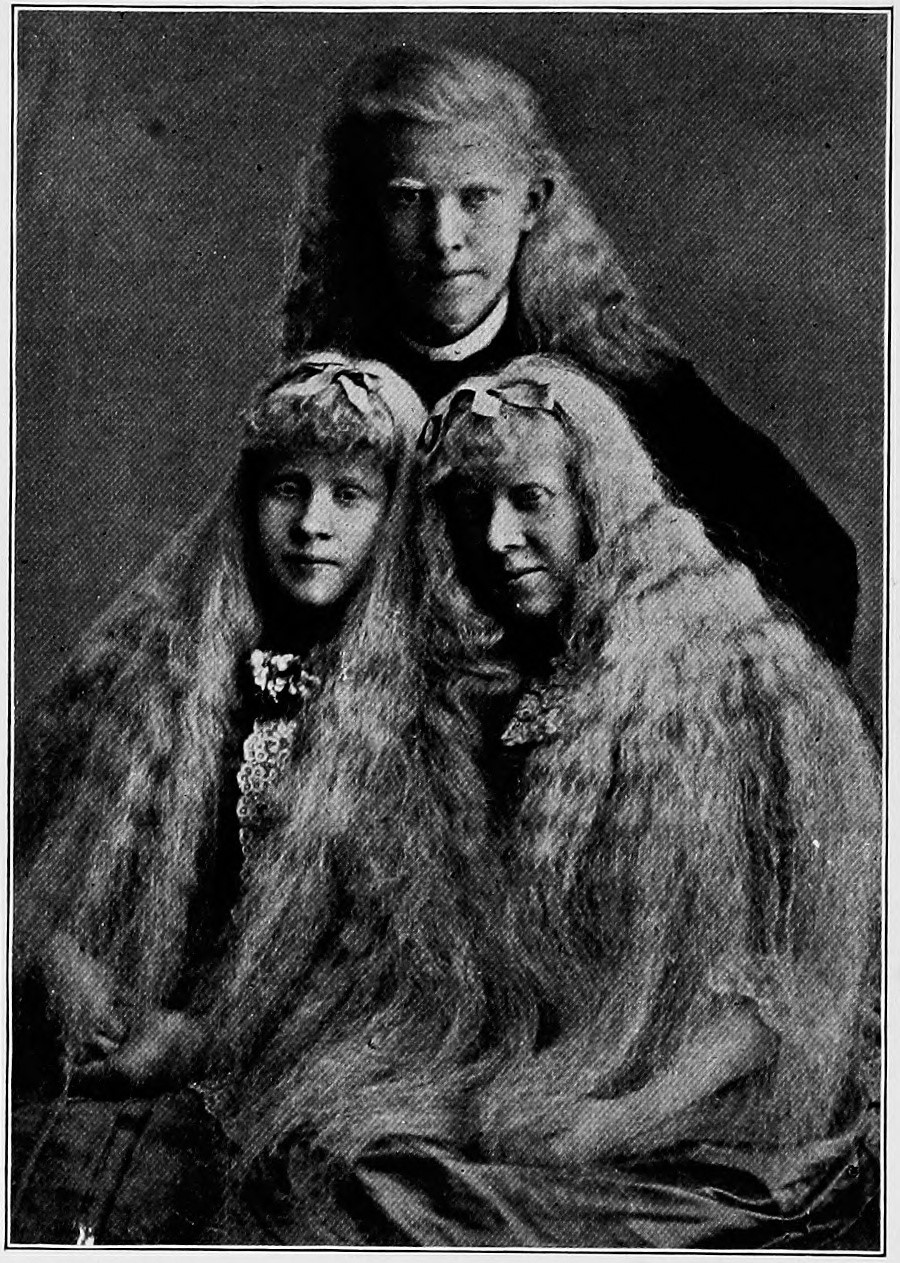
A family with albinism, showing inheritance

Oculocutaneous albinism is generally the result of the biological inheritance of genetically recessive alleles (genes) passed from both parents of an individual such as OCA1 and OCA2. Different OCA subtypes are caused by specific enzyme problems. OCA1 is due to a lack of the enzyme tyrosinase, resulting in no melanin production, while other types still allow partial enzyme activity and pigment production. A mutation in the human TRP-1 gene may result in the deregulation of melanocyte tyrosinase enzymes, a change that is hypothesized to promote brown versus black melanin synthesis, resulting in a third oculocutaneous albinism (OCA) genotype, "OCA3".

Molecular genetic testing has become the main method of confirming OCA subtype, as clinical features alone are often insufficient to distinguish between different genetic forms. Some rare forms are inherited from only one parent. There are other genetic mutations that are proven to be associated with albinism. All alterations, however, lead to changes in melanin production in the body.

The chance of offspring with albinism resulting from the pairing of an organism with albinism and one without albinism is low. However, because organisms (including humans) can be carriers of genes for albinism without exhibiting any traits, albinistic offspring can be produced by two non-albinistic parents. Albinism usually occurs with equal frequency in both sexes. An exception to this is ocular albinism, which it is passed on to offspring through X-linked inheritance. Thus ocular albinism occurs more frequently in males as they have a single X and Y chromosome, unlike females, whose genetics are characterized by two X chromosomes.

There are two different forms of albinism: a partial lack of the melanin is known as hypomelanism, or hypomelanosis, and the total absence of melanin is known as amelanism or amelanosis. Even within the same subtype, pigmentation levels can significantly vary, with some individuals producing small amounts of melanin, which results in a wide range of hypopigmentation rather than a complete absence of pigment.

=== Proximity to the Equator ===
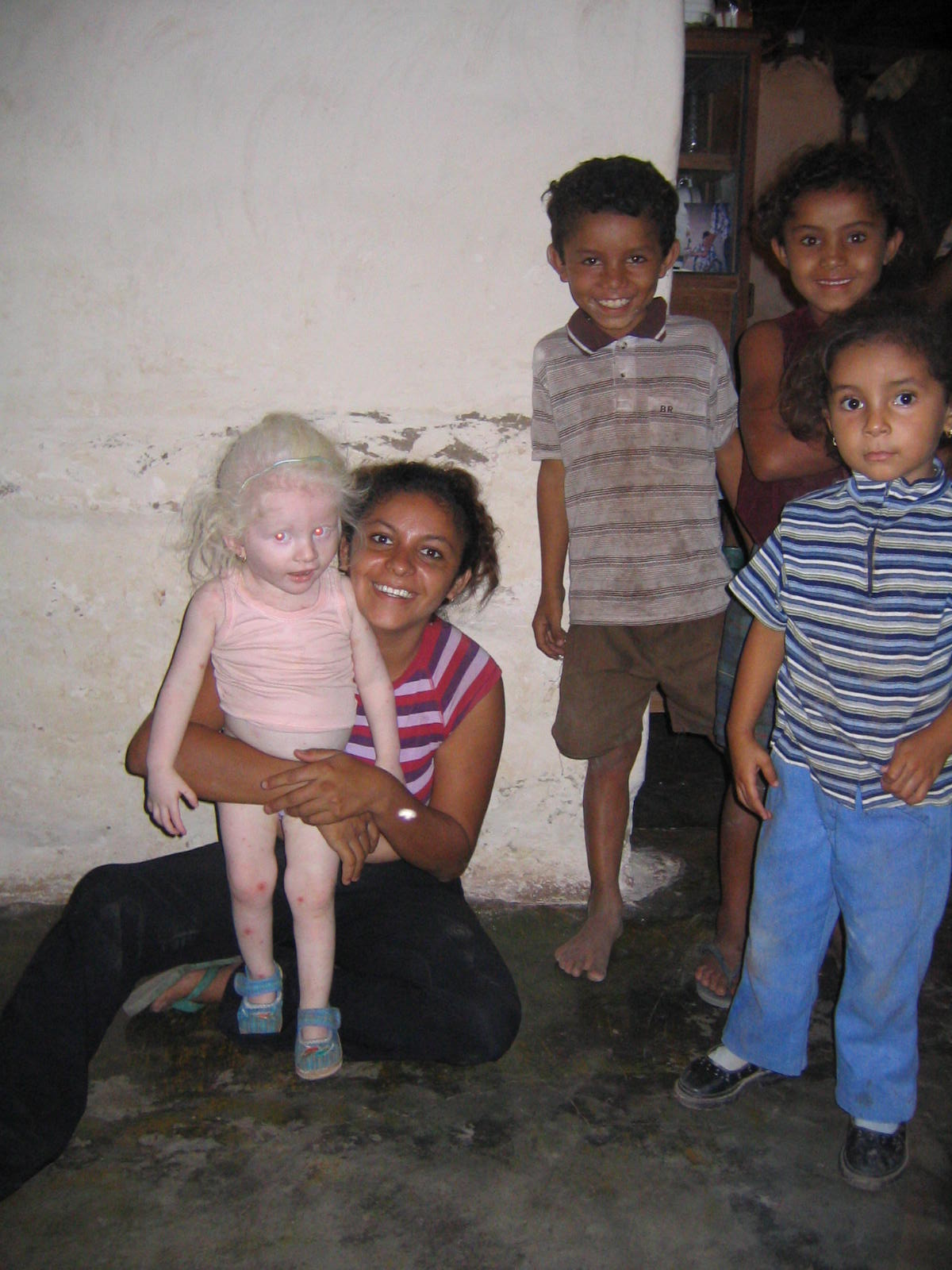
A young girl with albinism in Honduras, Central America

Individuals with oculocutaneous albinism residing in regions near the equator have a significantly increased risk of developing skin cancer called squamous cell carcinoma, a form of skin cancer that typically appears at a much earlier age than it does in most populations.

=== Enzyme ===
The enzyme defect responsible for OCA1-type albinism is tyrosine 3-monooxygenase (tyrosinase), which synthesizes melanin from the amino acid tyrosine. Tyrosinase catalyzes the conversion of tyrosine into L-DOPA and then to dopaquinone, which is the major rate-limiting step in melanin production.

=== Evolutionary theories ===
It is suggested that the early genus Homo (humans in the broader sense) started to evolve in East Africa around 3 million years ago. The dramatic phenotypic change from the ape-like Australopithecus to early Homo is hypothesized to have involved the extreme loss of body hair – except for areas most exposed to UV radiation, such as the head – to allow for more efficient thermoregulation in the early hunter-gatherers. The skin that would have been exposed upon general body hair loss in these early proto-humans would have most likely been non-pigmented, reflecting the pale skin underlying the hair of our chimpanzee relatives.

A positive advantage would have been conferred to early hominids inhabiting the African continent that were capable of producing darker skin – those who first expressed the eumelanin-producing MC1R allele – which protected them from harmful epithelium-damaging ultraviolet rays. Studies indicate that the evolution of dark skin in equatorial regions is closely associated with protection against folate breakdown caused by ultraviolet radiation, in addition to protection from DNA damage and the risk of skin cancer.

Over time, the advantage conferred to those with darker skin may have led to the prevalence of darker skin on the continent. The positive advantage, however, would have had to be strong enough so as to produce a significantly higher reproductive fitness in those who produced more melanin. The cause of a selective pressure strong enough to cause this shift is an area of much debate. Some hypotheses include the existence of significantly lower reproductive fitness in people with less melanin due to lethal skin cancer, lethal kidney disease due to excess vitamin D formation in the skin of people with less melanin, or simply natural selection due to mate preference and sexual selection.

When comparing the prevalence of albinism in Africa to its prevalence in other parts of the world, such as Europe and the United States, the potential evolutionary effects of skin cancer as a selective force due to its effect on these populations may not be insignificant. It would follow, then, that there would be stronger selective forces acting on albino individuals in Africa than on albinos in Europe and the US. In two separate studies in Nigeria, very few people with albinism appear to survive to old age. In regions with high ultraviolet radiation, people with albinism face higher risks of both severe sun damage and skin cancer, which reduces average life expectancy in affected populations without proper protection or access to medical care. One study found that 89% of people diagnosed with albinism are between 0 and 30 years of age, while the other found that 77% of albinos were under the age of 20.

It has also been theorized that albinism may have been able to spread in some Native American communities, because albino males were culturally revered and assumed as having divine origins. The very high incidence of albinism among the Hopi tribe has been frequently attributed to the privileged status of albino males in Hopi society, who were not required to perform physical work outdoors, shielding them from the harmful effects of UV radiation. This privileged status of albino males in Hopi society allowed them to reproduce with large numbers of non-albino women, spreading the genes that are associated with albinism.

== Comorbidities ==
Albinism can also be a feature alongside several syndromes:

- ABCD syndrome
- Albinism-hearing loss syndrome
- Chédiak–Higashi syndrome, in partial albinism
- Deafness, congenital, with total albinism
- Ermine phenotype in partial albinism
- Hermansky-Pudlak syndrome 1 to 11 (excluding 9)
- Microcephaly-albinism-digital anomalies syndrome
- Ocular albinism with late-onset sensorineural deafness
- Ocular albinism, type II
- Oculocutaneous albinism types 1B, 3 to 7
- Tyrosinase-negative oculocutaneous albinism
- Tyrosinase-positive oculocutaneous albinism
- Vici syndrome
- Waardenburg syndrome, type 2A

== Management ==
Since there is no cure for albinism, it is managed through lifestyle adjustments. People with oculocutaneous albinism need to take care not to get sunburnt and should have regular skin checks by a dermatologist. Due to the increased risk in skin cancer, individuals with oculocutaneous albinism might consider more frequent assessments from dermatologists, particularly those with a history of multiple non-melanoma skin cancers.

For the most part, treatment of the eye conditions consists of visual rehabilitation. Surgery is possible on the extra-ocular muscles to decrease strabismus. Nystagmus-damping surgery can also be performed, to reduce the "shaking" of the eyes back and forth. Experimental vision treatments such as Revital Vision have also been proven to help treat albinism through therapy session that improve processing of visual input through the use of Gabor patches. The effectiveness of all these procedures varies greatly and depends on individual circumstances.

Glasses (often with tinted lenses), low vision aids, and high contrast large-print or Braille materials can help individuals with albinism. Some people with albinism do well using bifocals with a strong reading lens, prescription reading glasses, hand-held devices such as magnifiers or monoculars or wearable devices like eSight and Brainport.

The condition may lead to abnormal development of the optic nerve and sunlight may damage the retina of the eye as the iris cannot filter out excess light due to a lack of pigmentation. Photophobia in albinism is primarily caused by reduced iris pigmentation and increased light scattering within the eye, and is typically managed with tinted lenses and environmental light control rather than medical treatment. Photophobia may be ameliorated by the use of sunglasses which filter out ultraviolet light.

Some use bioptics, glasses which have small telescopes mounted on, in, or behind their regular lenses, so that they can look through either the regular lens or the telescope. Newer designs of bioptics use smaller light-weight lenses. Some US states allow the use of bioptic telescopes for driving motor vehicles.

There are a number of national support groups across the globe which come under the umbrella of the World Albinism Alliance.

== Epidemiology ==
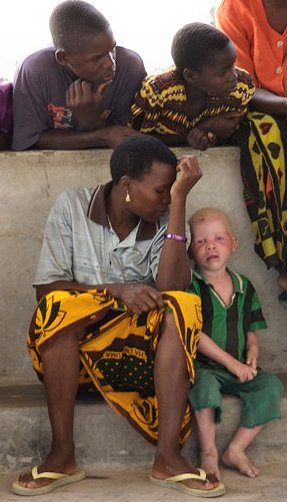
An albino boy with his mother in Tanzania

Albinism affects people of all ethnic backgrounds; its frequency worldwide is estimated to be approximately one in 17,000. Prevalence of the different forms of albinism varies considerably by population and is highest overall in people of sub-Saharan African descent. OCA2 is the most common subtype in sub-Saharan Africa, accounting for most cases in many population studies, and OCA1 is distributed globally. Today, the prevalence of albinism in sub-Saharan Africa is around 1 in 5,000, while in Europe and the US it is around 1 in 20,000 of the European-derived population. Rates as high as 1 in 1,000 have been reported for some populations in Zimbabwe and other parts of Southern Africa.

Certain ethnic groups and populations in isolated areas exhibit heightened susceptibility to albinism, presumably due to genetic factors. Smaller or geographically isolated populations face increased rates of albinism due to founder effect and genetic drift, where a small number of carriers result in a higher frequency of autosomal recessive mutations in the population. These include notably the Native American Guna, Zuni and Hopi nations (respectively of Panama, New Mexico and Arizona); Japan, in which one particular form of albinism is unusually common (OCA 4); and Ukerewe Island, the population of which shows a very high incidence of albinism.

== Society and culture ==
=== Special status of albinos in Native American culture ===
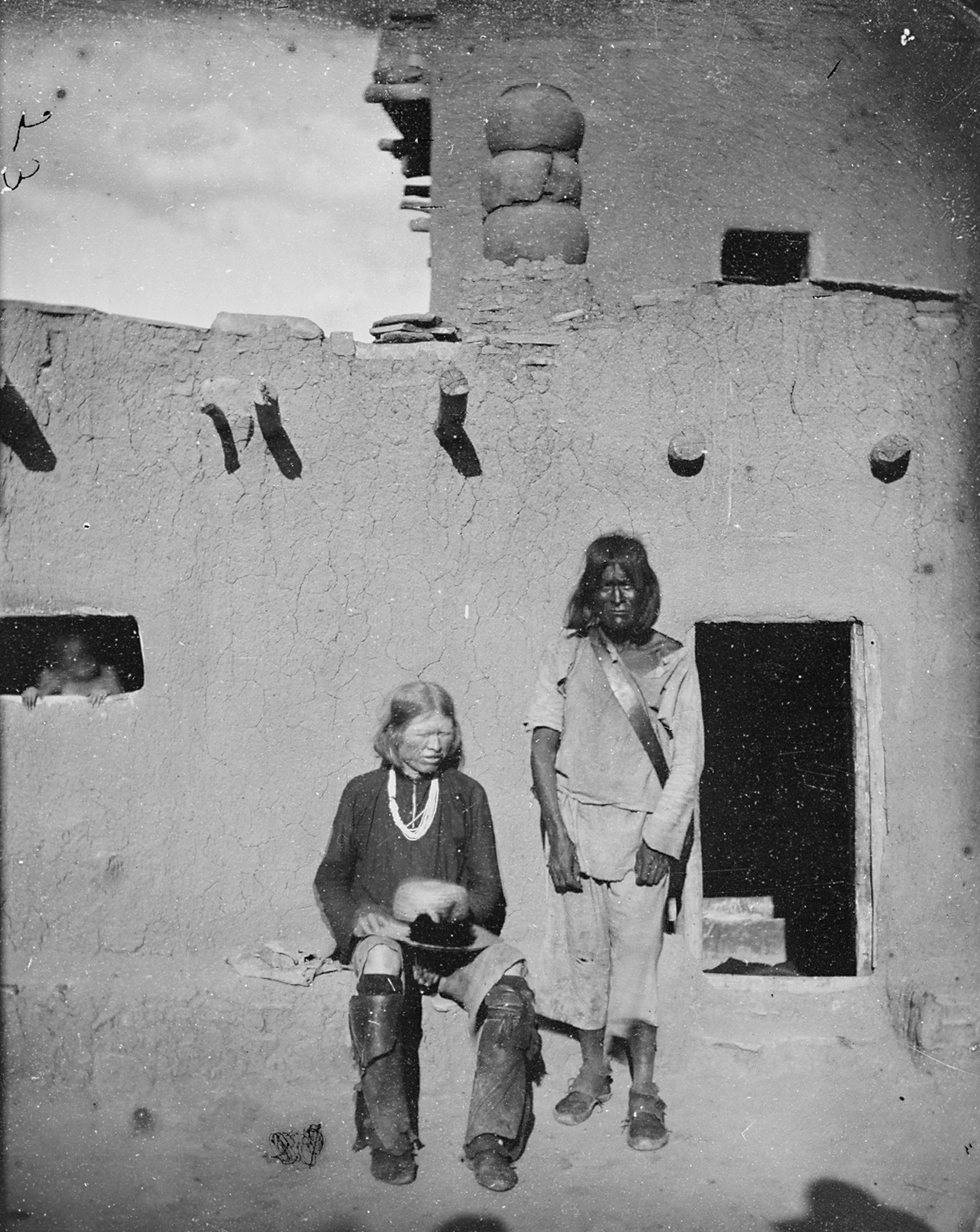
The man seated left is a Zuni with albinism. The Zuni people and other indigenous tribes of the American Southwest have a very high incidence of albinism.

In some Native American and South Pacific cultures, people with albinism have been traditionally revered, because they were considered heavenly beings associated with the sky. Among various indigenous tribes in South America, albinos were able to live luxurious lives due to their divine status. This special status was applied mainly to male albinos. It has been theorized that the very high level of albinism among some Native American tribes can be attributed to sexual privileges given to male albinos, which allowed them to reproduce with large numbers of non-albino women in their tribes, leading to the spread of genes that are associated with albinism.

=== Special status of albinos in Yoruba culture ===
In Yoruba tradition, albinos are regarded as the creator deity Obatala's favourite with a special place. In some parts of Yorubaland, albinos are regarded as highly spiritual and are treated as such.

=== Persecution of people with albinism ===
Humans with albinism often face social and cultural challenges (even threats), as the condition is often a source of ridicule, discrimination, or even fear and violence. It is especially socially stigmatised in some African societies. A study conducted in Nigeria on albino children stated that "they experienced alienation, avoided social interactions and were less emotionally stable. Affected individuals were less likely to complete schooling, find employment, and find partners."

Many cultures around the world have developed beliefs regarding people with albinism. The general quality of life for individuals with albinism may be affected, as challenges sometimes appear to be evident in academic performance, and partnership opportunities compared to the general population. A study reported higher levels of anxiety, experiences with social stigma, and a general decrease in the quality of life among individuals with oculocutaneous albinism, particularly in areas where awareness is limited.

In Tanzania and Burundi, there has been an unprecedented rise in witchcraft-related killings of people with albinism in recent years, because their body parts are used in potions sold by witch doctors. Numerous authenticated incidents of ritual sacrifice of albinos have occurred in East Africa during the 21st century. For example, in Tanzania, in September 2009, three men were convicted of killing a 14-year-old albino boy and severing his legs in order to sell them for witchcraft purposes.

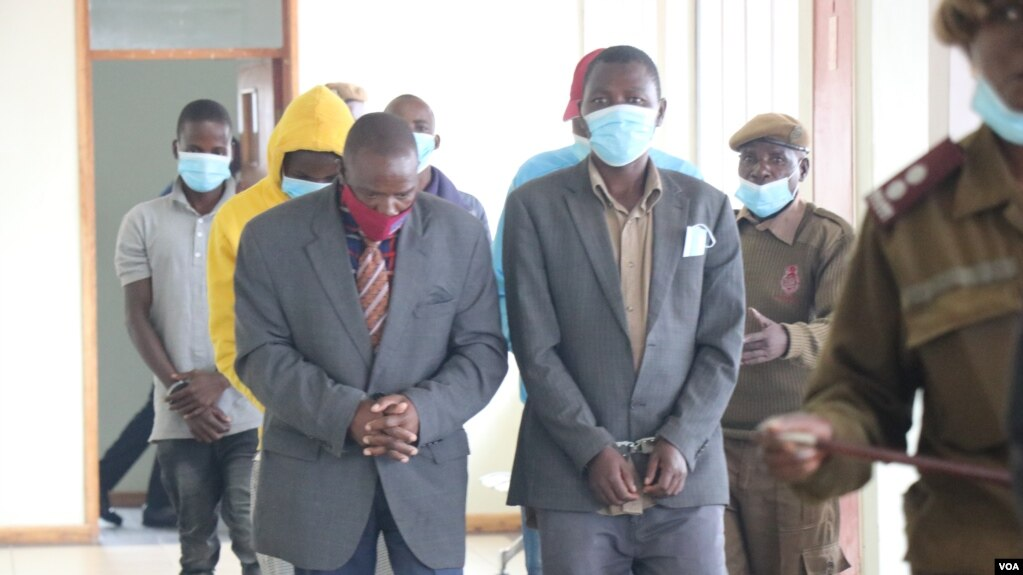
Men arrested for the murder of an albino person in Malawi, June 2022

Again in Tanzania and Burundi in 2010, the murder and dismemberment of a kidnapped albino child was reported from the courts, as part of a continuing problem. The US-based National Geographic Society estimated that in Tanzania a complete set of albino body parts is worth US$75,000. An overview of Albinism in Malawi further highlights similar incidents. People with albinism in Malawi face significant challenges, including discrimination and violence. Since 2014, over 170 attacks on people with albinism have been reported in Malawi. In 2022, a Malawian court convicted 12 individuals, including a police officer and a priest, for the murder of a 22-year-old man with albinism.

In 2019, six individuals with albinism ran for parliamentary and local government positions in Malawi, aiming to combat stigma through political engagement. The United Nations has warned that people with albinism in Malawi are at risk of "systemic extinction" due to relentless attacks fueled by superstitions. Efforts have been made to integrate people with albinism into public service roles. In 2022, Malawi's police service welcomed its first officers with albinism, aiming to restore confidence in law enforcement.

Another harmful and false belief is that sex with an albinistic woman will cure a man of HIV. This has led, for example in Zimbabwe, to rapes (and subsequent HIV infection).

=== Albinism in popular culture ===
Portrait of Benedetto Silva d'Angola, an African man with albinism, painted in the 17th century

Famous people with albinism include historical figures such as Oxford don William Archibald Spooner; actor-comedian Victor Varnado; musicians such as Johnny and Edgar Winter, Salif Keita, Winston "Yellowman" Foster, Brother Ali, Sivuca, Hermeto Pascoal, Willie "Piano Red" Perryman, his brother Speckled Red, Kalash Criminel; actor-rapper Krondon, and fashion models Connie Chiu, Ryan "La Burnt" Byrne and Shaun Ross.

Albinism organisations and others have expressed criticism over the portrayal of individuals with albinism in popular culture, specifically in movies and fictional works, citing the overwhelmingly negative depiction. There is concern that such depictions could increase social bias and discrimination against individuals with albinism. This phenomenon is often referred to as the "evil albino".

=== International Albinism Awareness Day ===
International Albinism Awareness Day was established after a motion was accepted in December 2014 by the United Nations General Assembly, proclaiming that 13 June would be known as International Albinism Awareness Day as of 2015. This was followed by a mandate created by the United Nations Human Rights Council that appointed Ms. Ikponwosa Ero, who is from Nigeria, as the first Independent Expert on the enjoyment of human rights by persons with albinism.

== See also ==
- Albinism–deafness syndrome
- Dyschromia
- Erythrism, unusually red pigmentation
- Heterochromia iridum
- Human variability
- Isabellinism
- Light skin
- Marie Antoinette syndrome
- Nevus, or birthmark
- Piebaldism, patchy alternating loss of and concentrations of dermal pigmentation
- Vitiligo (or leukoderma), patchy loss of dermal pigmentation
- Xanthochromism and axanthism, unusually yellow pigmentation and lack of yellow pigment, respectively
