= International Albinism Awareness Day =

Annual celebration on June 13

Commemorating 10 years of International Albinism Awareness Day

International Albinism Awareness Day (IAAD) is celebrated annually on June 13 to celebrate the human rights of persons with albinism worldwide.

== History ==
=== Early developments ===
Around the mid-2000s, reports made public a rising number of violent attacks on and murders of persons with albinism in Tanzania. Many reports have accused perpetrators of attributing magical powers to the bodies of persons with albinism, and thus being motivated to use them for lucky charms and occult rituals. Until 2015, perpetrators killed more than 70 victims and harmed many more. In response, the Tanzania Albinism Society (TAS) and other NGOs began campaigning for the human rights of persons with albinism. TAS celebrated the first Albino Day on May 4, 2006. It became National Albino Day from 2009 onwards and was eventually called National Albinism Day.

=== United Nations observance ===
On an international level, the Canadian NGO Under the Same Sun (UTSS) joined late Ambassador of the Mission of Somalia to the United Nations (UN), Yusuf Mohamed Ismail Bari-Bari, in his effort to pass a resolution promoting and protecting the rights of persons with albinism. Such a resolution came about when the Human Rights Council on June 13, 2013, adopted the first resolution ever on albinism. Later on, in its resolution 26/10 of June 26, 2014, the Human Rights Council recommended June 13 to be proclaimed as International Albinism Awareness Day by the United Nations' General Assembly. The UN's General Assembly, then, adopted on December 18, 2014, resolution 69/170 to proclaim, with effect from 2015, June 13 as International Albinism Awareness Day. The chosen date is reminiscent of the UN's first ever resolution which was passed on June 13 a year before. Today, IAAD is celebrated around the world from Tanzania, to Argentina, to Senegal, to Fiji, France, the United Kingdom and Namibia.

=== Yearly themes ===
Each year a theme is chosen to set the tone for the days celebrations. So far, they have been the following:

Year	Theme
2016	Celebrate diversity; promote inclusion; protect our rights
2017	Advancing with renewed hope
2018	Shining our light to the world
2019	Still standing strong
2020	Made to shine
2021	Strength beyond all odds
2022	United in making our voice heard
2023	Inclusion is strength
2024	10 years of IAAD: A decade of collective progress
2025	Demanding our rights: Protect our skin, Preserve our lives
2026	“Proudly in my skin -Celebrating all skin tones”
