= White and Black: Crimes of Color =

- Directed by: Jean-Francois Méan
- Written by: Jean-François Méan; John Kalina
- Produced by: Louis Laverdière
- Starring: Vicky Ntetema
- Cinematography: Jean-Pierre Saint-Louis
- Edited by: Glenn Berman
- Music by: Robert Marcel Lepage
- Production company: Cité Amérique
- Distributed by: Skin Deep Distribution
- Release date: November 2010
- Running time: 58'
- Countries: Canada; Tanzania
- Language: Swahili

White and Black: Crimes of Color is a Canadian documentary directed by Jean-François Méan. Broadcast throughout Tanzania in 2010, it portrays the discrimination, hardships and stigmatisation endured by persons with albinism in Tanzania.

Its premiere in Dar es Salaam was inaugurated by Tanzania's Prime Minister Mizengo Pinda. After its broadcast, the murder rate of persons with albinism in Tanzania, which had been stable for three straight years, dramatically decreased (90%). The film became the cornerstone of Pamoko: a multimedia awareness campaign to end trade for albino body parts in Tanzania. It included notable Tanzanian artists: K-sher, Fid Q, Bi Chau and King Majuto.

== Synopsis ==
Since 2007, Tanzania a murder wave of persons with albinism has swept the country to fuel an illicit trade in their body parts. Vicky Ntetema, a BBC Swahili radio journalist decides to investigate this trade and expose the roots of the beliefs that fuel it.

She follows the fate of the survivors of the attacks: two young girls and one young boy with albinism who have narrowly escaped their murderers and have been displaced as a result. Their only refuge: a school for the blind where no one can see their lack of pigmentation.

White and Black is a militant documentary that surpassed its status an NGO film by being screened in film festivals across the world.
