= Al-Shymaa Kway-Geer =

Tanzanian politician

Al-Shymaa Kway-Geer (born 1960) is a member of the parliamentary body, the National Assembly, of Tanzania. She is one of 48 women appointed to the Assembly by President Jakaya Kikwete. She was appointed in 2008.

== Biography ==
Kway-Geer was born in Tanga, Tanzania.

A former airline clerk, Kway-Geer, who has albinism, is charged with improving the treatment of such people in Tanzania, where many believe the condition to be a curse or source of magical power. Persecution of people with albinism is common in the region, including murder, mutilation and the harvesting of body parts.

== See also ==
- Salum Khalfani Bar'wani, the first person with albinism elected to the National Assembly of Tanzania.
