= Vicky Ntetema =

Tanzanian journalist (born 1958)

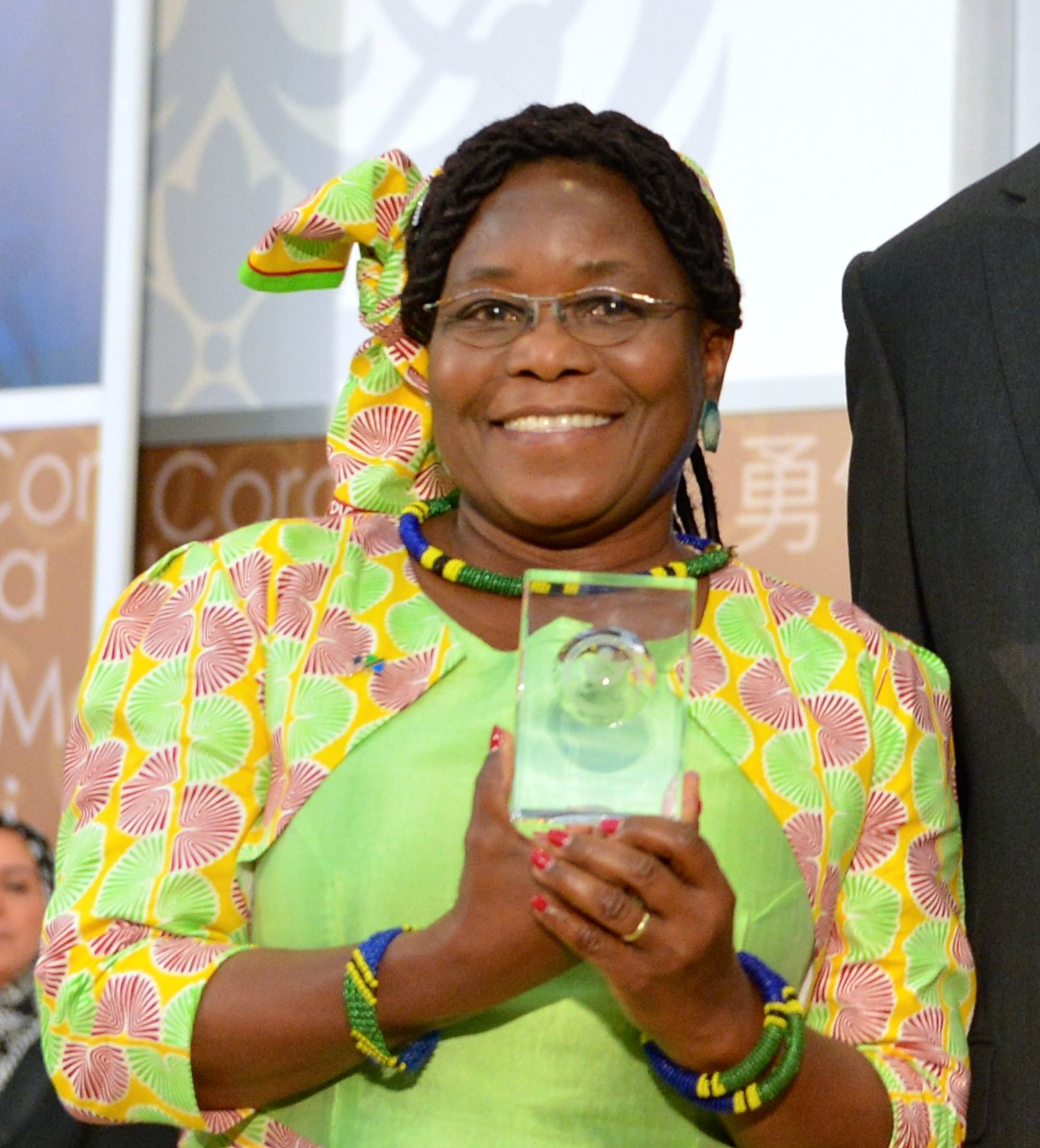
- Born: c. 1958; Tanganyika Territory (now Tanzania)
- Occupation: Journalist
- Employer(s): BBC, UTSS
- Known for: Reporting human rights abuses; human rights activism
- Website: Twitter

Vicky Ntetema (born c. 1958) is a Tanzanian journalist known for breaking the story about the murder of persons with albinism in Tanzania. Later, she became executive director of Under the Same Sun (UTSS) in Tanzania.

== Life and career ==
Ntetema was born in Tanzania in 1958. With a government scholarship she studied in the Soviet Union and received her master's degree in journalism in 1985 and also received her MSc in information systems development in 1998 at the London School of Economics in the UK. In 1991, Ntetema joined the BBC as a Swahili an electronic media journalist (radio presenter and producer) in London and in 2006 a senior journalist and bureau chief for the BBC World Service in Tanzania. Ntetema came to notice when in 2008 she broke a story about the murder of persons with albinism in Tanzania. Ntetema later left the BBC to become executive director of Under the Same Sun in Tanzania, a Canadian charity promoting the human rights of persons with albinism. A post she held until her retirement in May 2018.

== Reports on the persecution of persons with albinism in Tanzania ==
Ntetema's undercover investigation exposed that some Tanzanians saw persons with albinism as ghost-like beings and local witch doctors considered "their body parts as potent ingredients for magic charms" bringing success. Her reports were primarily responsible for drawing international attention to the situation. Due to threats against her, Ntetema had to go into hiding, required around the clock protection and had to leave the country twice for her own protection.

In 2010, the International Women's Media Foundation awarded her the Courage in Journalism Award for her reports. In 2016, the US secretary of state John Kerry awarded Ntetema the International Women of Courage Award.

== Awards ==
- Courage in Journalism Award in 2010
- Tanzania Women of Achievement Award in the category "Information and Communication" in 2013
- International Women of Courage Award in 2016
