= Kondowe =

Kondowe is a surname. Notable people with the surname include:

- Fisher Kondowe (born 1976), Malawian football player
- Maureen Kondowe (born 1973), Malawian judge
- Overstone Kondowe, Malawian politician
- Solomon Kondowe (born 1960), Malawian boxer
