= Salum Barwany =

Tanzanian Member of Parliament

Honourable Salum Barwany MP

Member of Parliament for Lindi Town
- In office November 2010 – November 2015
- Preceded by: Mohammed Abdulaziz

Personal details
- Born: 30 June 1959 (age 67) Tanganyika
- Party: CUF
- Education: Mingoyo Primary School; Mkonge Secondary School

Salum Khalfan Barwany or Salum Khalfani Bar'wani (born 30 June 1959) is a Tanzanian CUF politician and Member of Parliament for Lindi Town constituency. He is the first Tanzanian MP with albinism to be elected to parliament.

He was elected to the National Assembly of Tanzania (Swahili: Bunge la Tanzania) on 2 November 2010 from the district of Lindi Urban in the far south-east, and is the first albino to be elected to the Bunge in the country's history (the first to sit in the legislature was a woman, Al-Shymaa Kway-Geer, who appointed to the Bunge by the President, two years earlier).

Upon his election, Bar'wani stated:

I am so touched that this is the first time in the electoral history of this country for an albino to be elected by the people in a popular contest to be their representative in parliament – and not through sympathy votes or decisions.

Tanzania is a country noted both for a high incidence of albinism and persecution of people with albinism, especially by a cult of witchdoctors with considerable influence and power in rural areas.
