= Overstone =

Overstone may refer to:

- Overstone, Northamptonshire, England
- Samuel Jones-Loyd, 1st Baron Overstone (1796–1883), British banker and politician
- Overstone Kondowe (fl. 2021), Malawian politician
- Overstone Combined School, in Wing, Buckinghamshire, England
