= Martha Chanjo Lunji =

Malawian politician (died 2021)

Opposition Chief Whip
- In office July 2020 – 13 July 2021

Minister of Labour, Skills and Innovation
- In office 2019 – July 2020
- President: Peter Mutharika
- Succeeded by: Ken Kandodo

Member of Parliament for Nkhotakota North East
- In office May 2014 – 13 July 2021
- Succeeded by: Overstone Kondowe

Personal details
- Died: 13 July 2021 Kamuzu Central Hospital, Lilongwe, Malawi
- Party: Democratic Progressive Party

Martha Chanjo Lunji was a Malawian Democratic Progressive Party politician who was the Member of Parliament (MP) for Nkhotakota North East from 2014 until her death in 2021. She was Chief Whip of the DPP in opposition and had served as Minister of Labour, Skills and Innovation in Peter Mutharika's government.

== Life ==
Lunji held a Bachelor of Science in Electrical Engineering. She was a member of the Malawi Parliamentary Women's Caucus in the National Assembly. She died of COVID-19-related complications on the night of 13 July 2021 at Kamuzu Central Hospital.

== See also ==
- Politics of Malawi
