= Vici syndrome =

- Other names: Dionisi–Vici–Sabetta–Gambarara syndrome

Vici syndrome, also called immunodeficiency with cleft lip/palate, cataract, hypopigmentation and absent corpus callosum (or absent corpus callosum cataract immunodeficiency), is a rare autosomal recessive congenital disorder characterized by albinism, agenesis of the corpus callosum, cataracts, cardiomyopathy, severe psychomotor retardation, seizures, immunodeficiency and recurrent severe infections. To date, about 50 cases have been reported.

== Presentation ==
This syndrome consists of a number of typical features. These include

- Agenesis of the corpus callosum (80–99% patients)
- Hypopigmentation of the eyes and hair (80–99% patients)
- Cardiomyopathy (80–99% patients)
- Combined immunodeficiency (80–99% patients)
- Muscular hypotonia (80–99% patients)
- Abnormality of retinal pigmentation (80–99% patients)
- Recurrent chest infections (80–99% patients)
- Abnormal EEG (80–99% patients)
- Intellectual disability (80–99% patients)
- Cataracts (75%)
- Seizures (65%)
- Renal abnormalities (15%)

Infections of the gastrointestinal and urinary tracts are common. Swallowing and feeding difficulties early on may result in a failure to thrive. Optic nerve hypoplasia, nystagmus and photophobia may occur. Facial dysmorphism (cleft lip/palate and micrognathia) and syndactyly may be present. Sensorineural hearing loss may also be present.

Death in infancy is not uncommon and is usually due to cardiac complications or severe infections.

== Genetics ==
=== Inheritance ===
Vici syndrome has an autosomal recessive pattern of inheritance.

Vici syndrome is inherited in an autosomal recessive manner. This means the defective gene responsible for the disorder is located on an autosome, and two copies of the defective gene (one inherited from each parent) are required in order to be born with the disorder. The parents of an individual with an autosomal recessive disorder both carry one copy of the defective gene, but usually do not experience any signs or symptoms of the disorder. The hypothesis of autosomal recessive inheritance of Vici syndrome was strengthened in 2002 with the clinical description of two new cases, one brother and one sister, by Chiyonobu et al.

=== Gene ===
Vici syndrome is caused by mutations in the gene EPG5 (OMIM # 615068), which encodes an important regulator of the autophagy pathway, the ectopic P-granules autophagy protein 5, involved in the formation of lysosomes. EPG5 is the human homolog of the C.elegans epg5 gene. The gene EPG5 has been cloned for the first time by Nagase et al. by sequencing clones obtained from a size-fractionated fetal brain cDNA library, and was initially named KIAA1632.

The EPG5 human gene is located on chromosome 18q12.3, has a length of 119,67Kb (NC_000018.10), consists of 44 exons and is transcriptionally driven from the centromere toward the telomere. The messenger RNA (mRNA) is 12633bp long (NM_020964.2) and contains a CDS of 7740 bp translated into a protein sequence of 2579 amino acids (NP_066015.2) with a molecular weight of 280kDa, presumed. The protein EPG5 is expressed primarily in the central nervous system (CNS), skeletal muscle, heart, thymus, cells of the immune system, lungs and kidneys.

Mutations in the EPG5 gene interfere with the autophagy. This appears to be due to a block in the autophagosome-lysosome fusion mechanism.

== Diagnosis ==
The diagnostic workup usually includes an MRI of the brain, an EEG, ophthalmic examination and a cardiac ECHO. Muscle biopsy – which is not commonly done – may show storage of abnormal material and secondary mitochondrial abnormalities in skeletal muscle. Other features that may be seen on muscle biopsy include variability in fibre size, increase in internal and centralized nuclei, type 1 fibre hypotrophy with normally sized type 2 fibres, increased glycogen storage and variable vacuoles on light microscopy

The diagnosis is confirmed by sequencing of the EPG5.

=== Differential diagnosis ===
This includes ataxia–telangiectasia, Chédiak–Higashi syndrome, DiGeorge syndrome, Griscelli syndrome and Marinesco–Sjögren syndrome.

== Treatment ==
There is no known curative treatment presently. Hearing aids and cataract surgery may be of use. Control of seizures, heart failure, and treatment of infection is essential. Tube feeding may be needed.

== Eponym ==
Vici syndrome was first described by Carlo Dionisi-Vici et al. (Rome, Italy) in an article from 1988 about two brothers with a previously unreported disorder. Since then, a few articles have reported the same disorder, which subsequently obtained the name Vici syndrome.

About 10 years later, del Campo et al. described 4 patients (including 2 sibs, a male and a female) with clinical features very similar to those reported by Dionisi-Vici.

In 2007, the renal tubular acidosis was another clinical complication described in only one case report of two brothers with Vici syndrome.

In 2010 and 2012, it has also been reported a neuromuscular involvement in patients suffering from this syndrome.

In 2013, Vici syndrome has been associated with mutations in the gene EPG5 (OMIM # 615068), which encodes an important regulator of the autophagy pathway, the ectopic P-granules autophagy protein 5, involved in the formation of lysosomes.

In 2014, the ophthalmologic features of Vici syndrome were carefully evaluated.

In 2015, the doctoral thesis entitled "Deciphering the mechanism of immune dysfunction in Vici Syndrome", University of Rome "La Sapienza" by Dr. Evangelos Axiotis, clarifies the molecular mechanisms and the role of the mutations in EPG5, all responsible for the immunodeficiency present in patients with Vici syndrome.
