= Albinism–deafness syndrome =

- Other names: Woolf syndrome and Ziprkowski–Margolis syndrome
- Albinism–deafness syndrome is inherited in an X-linked recessive manner
- Specialty: Dermatology

Albinism–deafness syndrome is a rare condition characterized by congenital neural deafness and a severe or extreme piebald-like phenotype with extensive areas of hypopigmentation.

A locus at Xq26.3-q27.1 has been suggested.

It has been suggested that it is a form of Waardenburg syndrome type II.

== Presentation ==
Males affected by albinism-deafness syndrome present with profound sensorineural deafness and severe pigmentary abnormalities of the skin (piebald pigmentary variegation).

Female carriers present with variable hearing impairment without pigmentary abnormalities.

== Cause ==
The gene that causes albinism-deafness syndrome is thought to be located on the q arm of the X chromosome. It has been variously mapped to Xq26.3-q27.1 and Xq24-q26 using DNA probes.

== See also ==
- Albinism in humans
