= Connie Chiu =

Fashion model and jazz musician

- Born: 1969 (age 55–56); British Hong Kong
- Height: 5 ft 6 in (1.68 m)
- Website: ConnieChiu.com

Connie Chiu (born 1969) is a fashion model and jazz musician known for being the world's first fashion model with albinism.

Chiu was born in British Hong Kong and grew up in Kowloon. The congenital absence of pigmentation in her skin and hair, makes them sensitive to the sun. To avoid Chiu's exposure to Hong Kong's intensive sun, her family moved to Sweden when she was seven years old.

Connie Chiu was first introduced to modeling at age 21, when her sister asked her to become a model at one of her final shows. After sending a black-and-white photograph to French fashion designer Jean-Paul Gaultier, he invited her to model at his autumn/winter 1994 show. At age 25, Chiu began modeling for fashion photographers such as Terry Richardson, Paul Burley, Heidi Niemala and Morten Smidt. Chiu later studied journalism.

Chiu starred in the music video for the single "Stalker" by Recoil, the solo project of Depeche Mode member Alan Wilder.
