= Josephat Torner =

Tanzanian albino activist (died 2020)

Josephat Torner (1977/1978 – 12 April 2020) was a Tanzanian albino activist. He was featured in the documentary In the Shadow of the Sun.

== Activism ==
Torner was born in Ngwangwege, near Lake Victoria. Torner stated that his mother was told by the midwife to poison him, but did not do so, instead encouraging him to go to school. When he was twelve his mother died. Torner then came into contact with a Pentecostal church and then followed his secondary education. Torner subsequently moved to Sweden and studied management for three years. Torner at one point worked as a teacher.

Since 2004 Torner was an activist for albino rights. In 2006 he gave up his teaching job, to focus full time on his activism. Torner travelled around Tanzania and the world to educate on knowledge of albinism and on persecution of people with albinism. Torner worked for the Ukerewe Albino Association on Ukerewe Island.

Torner worked together with director Harry Freeland on the documentary In the Shadow of the Sun. The pair worked together on the project for six years. In the documentary Torner amongst other things confronts a local witchdoctor, who are frequently involved in persecution of albinos. He climbed Mount Kilimanjaro to attract attention for his cause. He reached the top on 8 August 2011. Torner said he climbed the mountain to show African countries: "that we are able. But [also] protect us, give us a chance, don't stigmatize, don't isolate, don't hide us to the darkness room -- just open the way". Elizabeth May, leader of the Green Party of Canada subsequently called him an international hero and compared him with Terry Fox. Torner had plans to climb Mount Everest in 2016. In 2018 Torner climbed Mount Kilimanjaro again.

Torner survived two attacks on his life. He criticized the Tanzanian government for not doing enough to educate others on misconceptions and superstitions regarding albinism.

To raise more awareness and acceptance for albinos in Tanzania, Torner founded the Josephat Torner Foundation Europe Together with Pieter Staadegaard they have successfully set up various projects to promote equality for people with albinism. Pieter Staadegaard has even started a coffee roastery Usawa Coffee where Tanzanian specialty coffee is roasted and sold, with part of the profits going to the Josephat Torner Foundation Europe

On 12 April 2020, Torner was killed in Mwanza at age 42 when he was hit by a motorist while crossing the street.

== Personal life ==
Torner was married and had three children.
