= National Organization for Albinism and Hypopigmentation =

U.S. nonprofit organization

The National Organization for Albinism and Hypopigmentation (NOAH) is a non-profit organization that assists people who have albinism. NOAH was created in 1982 and is based in East Hampstead, New Hampshire, United States.

NOAH is operated by volunteers. It is funded primarily by member dues and contributions. NOAH also receives received grants for specific projects, such as its handbook for new parents. The NOAH board of directors has committees on advocacy, conferences, financial development, albinism awareness, and editorial.

NOAH sponsors workshops and conferences on albinism. It also publishes a quarterly magazine, Albinism InSight, information bulletins, a network of local chapters and contact people, an informational Web site and bulletin boards. The objective is to disseminate correct information about albinism through the media, libraries, medical professionals, and support groups for people with albinism in the United States and other countries the Albinism World Alliance.

== Advocacy ==
NOAH has worked with Positive Exposure and the Under the Same Sun Fund to stop the violence against individuals with albinism in parts of Africa, specifically in Tanzania. In that nation, dozens of people with albinism have been slaughtered by individuals believing that their body parts will bring them good fortune.

in 2006 NOAH criticized the creators of the film The Da Vinci Code for its portrayal of a clichéd and offensive albino character named Silas. In a report by the Associated Press, NOAH President Mike McGowan was quoted as saying "The Da Vinci character is just the latest in a long string. The problem is there has been no balance. There are no realistic, sympathetic or heroic characters with albinism that you can find in movies or popular culture."

Skinema.com, a Web site run by San Francisco dermatologist Vail Reese, documents the portrayal of conditions like albinism in the media. NOAH works to counter negative and inaccurate depictions of albinism.

== Conferences and national events ==
Every two years, NOAH hosts the NOAH National Conference. Session topics include genetic research, vision testing, educational concerns, employment, makeup, social issues and technology. Because of the rarity of albinism, the NOAH conferences allow people with albinism to meet with others sharing the same condition. Several local chapters and special interest groups also host mini-conferences throughout the year.

On years between national conferences, Noah hosts a social weekend called Adult Day. The event provides educational programming, social events and community service projects to keep the albinism community connected.

In 2005, NOAH held its first Family Summer Camp in Mount Union, Pennsylvania. This was the first and only summer camp experience designed specifically for children with albinism. The camp provides structured activities, educational sessions and social events for young children and families, taking into account the unique visual and sun care needs of children with the condition.

In 2008, NOAH established the Michael J. McGowan Leadership Scholarship Award for college students with albinism. It was named after NOAH president Michael J. McGowan. NOAH awards one scholarship annually to a student with albinism enrolled in an undergraduate college program.

== Support services for parents of newly diagnosed children ==
NOAH provides special support to parents with newly diagnosed children. NOAH's Rapid Responder Program connects new parents with other parents of children with albinism to share concerns and reassurance. Specially trained Rapid Responders provide medical, social and biological information on albinism.

In 2008, NOAH announced the release of its first full-length book, titled Raising a Child with Albinism: A Guide to the Early Years. While its focus is on children from birth through first grade, the book also provides information and advice for parents of older children.

== Partnerships ==
NOAH maintains collaborative relationships with the HPS Network, which promotes research, fellowship and advocacy for individuals with Heřmanský–Pudlák syndrome. In 1998, NOAH established a relationship with Positive Exposure, a New York-based initiative that celebrates genetic diversity through photography and international advocacy efforts.
