= Ikponwosa Ero =

Nigerian lawyer and advocate (born 1981)

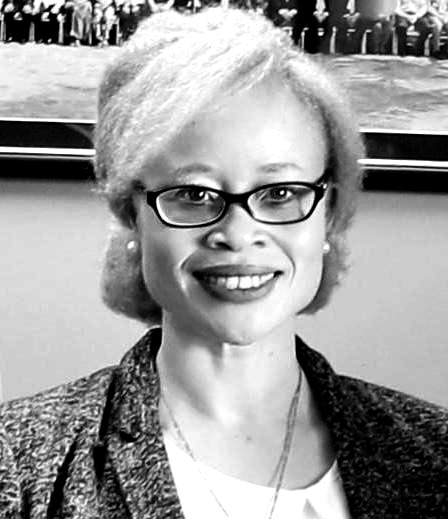
- Born: 1981 (age 44–45); Nigeria
- Occupation: Lawyer
- Employer: United Nations
- Known for: UN advocate for people with albinism

Ikponwosa "I.K." Lauretta Ero is a lawyer and advocate in the field of international human rights. She is the first United Nations Independent Expert on the enjoyment of human rights by persons with albinism. Ero was a key player in drawing global attention to the human rights issues faced by people with albinism worldwide, particularly in the region of Africa where they were being attacked for their body parts.

Ikponmwosa Ero was a principal architect of the Regional Action Plan on Albinism (2017-2021) and the subsequent Plan of Action on Albinism and its Implementation Framework (2021-2031) . She was also a key actor with the late Ambassador Yusuf Mohamed Ismail "Bari-Bari," in the establishment of the International Albinism Awareness Day and in the promulgation and execution of various high-level advocacy events leading to the adoption of several resolutions at the United Nations and the African Union.

== Early life ==
I.K. Ero was born in Ibadan, Oyo State, Nigeria, in 1981 to parents from the Bini/Edo tribe of Nigeria. Her Father, Dr Isaac Izogie Ero, is a member of the Ero family who are traditional kingmakers in the Benin Kingdom. He was a professor of forestry who served as Director of the Forestry Research Institute of Nigeria. Her mother, Comfort Iyase Adesuwa Ero, is the daughter of the Iyase of Udo and is an author and playwright who also worked as a secondary school principal and lecturer.

I.K. is the fifth child out of six and the only one with albinism. She attended Sacred Heart Private School Ibadan for her primary education and Federal Government Girls College Benin for her secondary education, both in Nigeria. At the age of fifteen, Ero immigrated with her family to Canada. There, she completed her high school at St. Andrews Regional High School, Victoria BC, obtained an undergraduate degree in political science and international relations from the University of British Columbia, a master's degree in political science from the University of Alberta, a Juris Doctor degree from the University of Calgary and a Master of Law degree from Osgoode Hall Law School. In July 2022, Ero received an Honorary Doctorate of Laws (honoris causa) from Lancaster University, UK, in recognition of her work as a mandate-holder at the United Nations Human Rights Council.

== Career ==
After serving as researcher in various faculties at the University of British Columbia and at the University of Alberta, Ero attended law school and was called to the bar in Alberta in 2013 and in the same year to the bar in British Columbia. After working briefly at the Canadian Federal Department of Justice, Ero worked as an international advocacy and legal officer for an international non-governmental organization, Under The Same Sun.

In 2015, Ero was appointed by the United Nations Human Rights Council as the first Independent Expert on the enjoyment of human rights by persons with albinism. In this capacity, she conducted official visits and missions to locations including Mozambique, Malawi, Tanzania, Fiji, Brazil, and Kenya.

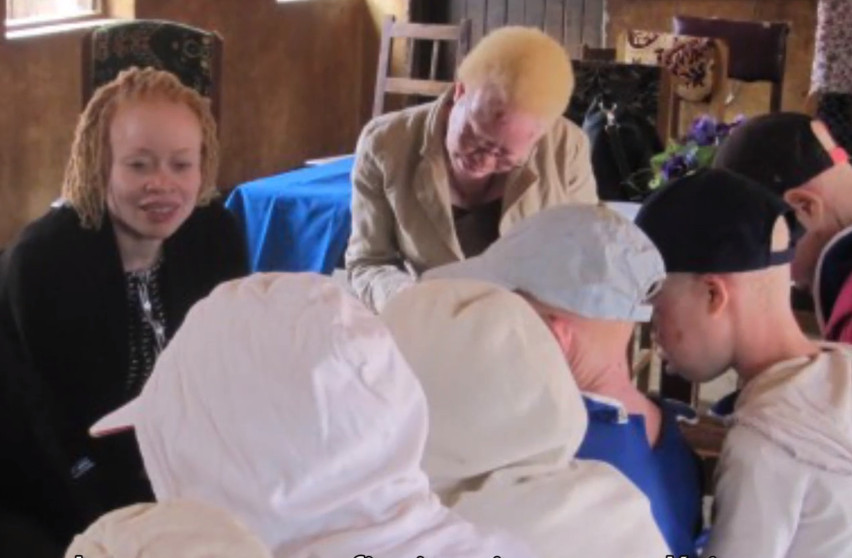
An advocate for people with albinism

Ikponwosa Ero's mandate produced significant steps forward for people with albinism worldwide, including massively raising awareness through engagement with hundreds of media outlets and publishing more than 37 official reports on the situation. Her work on the elimination of harmful practices—particularly her organization of the first international workshop on harmful practices related to accusation of witchcraft and ritual attacks (HPAWR) -- ultimately culminated in draft guidelines issued by the African Union's Pan African Parliament, and a resolution by the UN Human Rights Council to address these practices.

Ikponmwosa Ero initiated the Global Albinism Alliance and the Africa Albinism Network. She currently serves as Director of Human Rights of Under The Same Sun, as well as a Technical Adviser to the Africa Albinism Network. She is the author of scores of articles in the field of human rights and is the co-lead of the multi-country research on Mothering and Albinism.

== Awards And Recognition ==
2022 - Doctor of Laws (LLD) Honoris Causa, Lancaster University, UK

2020 - International Advocate Award by the US Council on Disabilities

2020 - Diversability, D-30 Impact List Award

2017 - Recognized among the 100 Most Influential Africans by Pan African Magazine

2015 - Listed in UNESCO's list of Top 70 Women Speakers Worldwide
