= ESight =

Brand of electronic eyewear

eSight is a wearable medical device designed to improve the functional vision of those living with low vision or legal blindness. The device was developed by Canadian-based company eSight Corp.

== History ==
eSight was founded in 2006 by Conrad Lewis, a Canadian electrical engineer with two legally blind sisters. His motivation was to build a device that would enable his sisters to see, be able to work and independently perform virtually all activities of daily living.

The first generation of the device, eSight 1, was released in October. The second generation, eSight 2, was released in May 2015 and contained several hardware upgrades, including HD OLED screens, enhanced color and screen resolution and a longer battery life.

The eSight 3 was released in February 2017. In May 2017, Time magazine included eSight on its list of “The Best Tech of 2017 So Far.”

eSight 4 was released in early 2020.

In 2022 eSight entered into a partnership with Gentex Corporation of Zeeland, Michigan to develop the next generation device, eSight Go. eSight assets were acquired by Gentex Corporation in 2023, first announced in January 2024.

The 5th generation device, eSight Go was released in 2024.

== Specifications ==
eSight includes two HD color displays, one in front of each eye, with prescription lenses tailored to the user's particular prescription. The displays integrate dual independent, high contrast OLED screens, 1024x768 resolution and a 37.5 degree field-of-view. The camera on the front of the device captures video in Ultra HD at 21.5 MP and allows for up to 24x zoom. eSight's user interface also features HDMI and USB inputs, Bluetooth, Wi-Fi and removable SD cards.
