= Institute for Human Rights and Development in Africa =

The Institute for Human Rights and Development in Africa (IHRDA) is a pan African non-governmental organisation whose primary work is the provision of pro bono legal counsel to victims of human rights violations. In its litigation mandate, IHRDA represents victims of human rights violations in cases before national courts and African regional human rights instances.

== History ==
The Institute for Human Rights and Development in Africa was founded and established in 1998 in Banjul, the Gambia, by two human rights lawyers, Julia Harrington and Alpha Fall, who had worked for the Secretariat of the African Commission on Human and Peoples’ Rights.

IHRDA's mandate is to increase the effectiveness and accessibility of the human rights protection mechanisms of the African Union, since the most critical challenge to the effectiveness of the African human rights system is a lack of awareness concerning its procedures. IHRDA has undertaken to promote respect for human rights on the continent by strengthening the human rights institutions in Africa, ensuring compliance with the existing norms and making the system widely accessible to victims of human rights violations and other actors of civil society.

On February 11, 2008, IHRDA celebrated ten years of standing up for human rights in Africa. Throughout the year, all IHRDA publications were marked with a special ten-year anniversary banner.

== Work ==
To achieve its mandate, IHRDA uses its particular expertise in the application of African human rights law to:

- Train the NGO community and other human rights activists and workers on how to investigate, prepare and present cases of human rights violations before the African human rights treaty bodies;
- Train State actors involved in the protection and promotion of human rights in Africa;
- Serve as pro bono counsel for individuals and NGOs litigating their cases against State parties before the African human rights treaty bodies;
- Research emerging areas of human rights law and development in Africa for publication and dissemination;
- Network and collaborate with other human rights NGOs and African human rights treaty bodies for the promotion and protection of human rights in Africa;
- Advocate for legal reforms in the areas of human rights at the national and continental levels in Africa.

=== Cases and legal work ===
IHRDA engages with domestic actors in various countries through capacity-building and case-building, and provides pro bono legal counsel to victims of human rights violations. By instituting cases on behalf of victims of human rights violations, IHRDA aims to increase the application and enforcement of African human rights instruments to bring effective remedies to these victims.

IHRDA maintains a focus on the protection of women and children's rights, the right to fair trial, the right to life, freedom of expression, refugees’ and migrants’ rights, freedom from discrimination and torture, as well as socio-economic rights and transitional justice. However, IHRDA continues to pay attention to diverse issues emerging and pertinent on the African continent.

=== Dissemination of information ===
IHRDA runs the African Human Rights Case Law Analyser (the CLA), which is the first and most comprehensive online collection of legislations and decisions from African regional and sub-regional human rights protection bodies in three languages (English, French and Portuguese).

In 2016, IHRDA launched an online database of legal resources (laws and court judgments in English and French) related to sexual and gender-based violence in African countries; it currently covers five countries. Efforts are on-going to expand the database to cover other countries.

== Board ==
The board of directors is responsible for policy development and general management of IHRDA. Members of the Board are appointed based on their expertise and experience in international human rights law and their interest in human rights and development in Africa.

== Partners ==
IHRDA works with different organisations active in various African countries and involved in the protection and promotion of human rights through the African Human Rights System. Together, they aim to train human rights defenders in the complaints procedures of the African Human Rights System, define cases and represent clients in strategic public interest human rights litigation.
