= Pereira Silima =

Tanzanian politician

Honourable Pereira Silima MP

Deputy Minister of Home Affairs
- Incumbent
- Assumed office 7 May 2012
- Minister: Emmanuel Nchimbi (2012–13); Mathias Chikawe (2014–)

Deputy Minister of Finance and Economic Affairs
- In office 28 November 2010 – 7 May 2012
- Minister: Mustafa Mkulo

Member of Parliament for Chumbuni
- Incumbent
- Assumed office November 2010

Personal details
- Born: 14 March 1959 (age 67) Tanganyika
- Party: CCM
- Education: Forestry Training Institute (Dip)

Pereira Silima (born 14 March 1959) is a Tanzanian CCM politician and Member of Parliament for Chumbuni constituency since 2010. He is the current Deputy Minister of Home Affairs.
