= Microcephaly albinism digital anomalies syndrome =

- X-ray of a patient with microcephaly albinisim digital anomalies syndrome.

Microcephaly albinism digital anomalies syndrome is a very rare congenital genetic disease. The syndrome includes microcephaly, micrognathia, oculocutaneous albinism, hypoplasia of the distal phalanx of fingers, and agenesia of the distal end of the right big toe.

== Symptoms and signs ==
Microcephaly albinism digital anomalies syndrome's symptoms may vary from individual to individual, however there are many common symptoms, associated with this rare genetic disease. Common symptoms are:

- microcephaly
- oculocutaneous albinism
- Slow development of the fingers
- hypoplasia of the distal phalanx of fingers
- tyrosinase‐positive oculocutaneous albinism
- Recurrent bacterial infections
- granulocytopenia
- intermittent thrombopenia
- protruding midface/dysmorphism
- rough and projecting hair
- mild intellectual disability

== Genetics ==
In males, duplication of a portion of Xq chromosome is associated with multiple congenital anomalies and developmental delay. Most females recognized as having dup(Xq) chromosomes are phenotypically apparently normal relatives of phenotypically abnormal males. The disease also is associated with the inactivation of the duplicated X chromosomes.
