= Ocular albinism =

- Specialty: Endocrinology

Ocular albinism is a form of albinism which, in contrast to oculocutaneous albinism, presents primarily in the eyes. There are multiple forms of ocular albinism, which are clinically similar.

Both known genes are on the X chromosome. When the term "autosomal recessive ocular albinism" ("AROA") is used, it usually refers to mild variants of oculocutaneous albinism rather than ocular albinism, which is X-linked.

== Types ==
Name	OMIM	Gene	Description
Ocular albinism, type 1 (OA1)	300500	GPR143	Also known as Nettleship–Falls syndrome, is the most common variety of ocular albinism. OA1 is usually associated with nystagmus, and difficult to otherwise detect in females; males show more readily observable symptoms.
Ocular albinism, type 2 (OA2)	300600	CACNA1F	Also known as Forsius–Eriksson syndrome or "Åland eye disease", mostly affects males, though females are often carriers and can sometimes be symptomatic; it is frequently linked with protanopic dichromacy (a form of color blindness) and with night blindness (nyctalopia).
Ocular albinism with sensorineural deafness (OASD)	300650	? (Xp22.3)	Is, as its name implies, associated with loss of hearing. May be the same as OA1.
