= GPR143 =

Protein-coding gene in the species Homo sapiens

Identifiers
- Aliases: GPR143, NYS6, OA1, G protein-coupled receptor 143
- External IDs: OMIM: 300808; MGI: 107193; GeneCards: GPR143

Gene location (Mouse)
Chr.	X chromosome (mouse)
Band	X F3|X 68.46 cM	Start	151,564,917 bp
Band	X F3|X 68.46 cM	End	151,591,642 bp
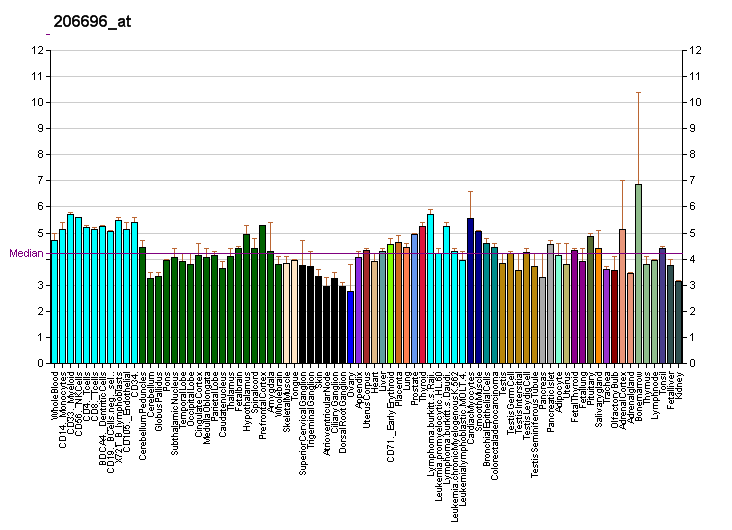
RNA expression pattern
Bgee	Human / Mouse (ortholog); Top expressed in: oocyte; secondary oocyte; retinal pigment epithelium; caudate nucleus; nucleus accumbens; putamen; cingulate gyrus; amygdala; skin of abdomen; Brodmann area 9 / Top expressed in: iris; retinal pigment epithelium; hair follicle; ciliary body; embryo; stria vascularis; embryo; morula; endothelial cell of lymphatic vessel; primary oocyte; More reference expression data
BioGPS	More reference expression data
Gene ontology
Molecular function	L-DOPA binding; G protein-coupled receptor activity; signal transducer activity; dopamine binding; tyrosine binding; protein binding; L-DOPA receptor activity
Cellular component	cytoplasm; integral component of membrane; Golgi apparatus; membrane; melanosome; melanosome membrane; lysosomal membrane; apical plasma membrane; lysosome; plasma membrane
Biological process	eye pigment biosynthetic process; regulation of melanosome transport; melanosome localization; melanosome organization; melanosome transport; regulation of calcium-mediated signaling; regulation of melanosome organization; calcium-mediated signaling using intracellular calcium source; phosphatidylinositol-mediated signaling; signal transduction; visual perception; neuropeptide signaling pathway; G protein-coupled receptor signaling pathway
Sources:Amigo / QuickGO
Orthologs
Databases	NCBI: entry
Species	Human	Mouse
Entrez	4935	18241
Ensembl	n/a	ENSMUSG00000025333
UniProt	P51810	P70259
RefSeq (mRNA)	NM_000273	NM_010951
RefSeq (protein)	NP_000264	NP_035081
Location (UCSC)	n/a	Chr X: 151.56 – 151.59 Mb
PubMed search
- Wikidata
View/Edit Human	View/Edit Mouse

Ocular albinism type 1 protein

Identifiers
- Symbol: Ocular_alb
- Pfam: PF02101
- Pfam clan: CL0192
- InterPro: IPR001414
Available protein structures:
- PDB: IPR001414 PF02101 (ECOD; PDBsum)
- AlphaFold: IPR001414; PF02101

G-protein coupled receptor 143, also known as Ocular albinism type 1 (OA1) in humans, is a conserved integral membrane protein with seven transmembrane domains and similarities with G protein-coupled receptors (GPCRs) that is expressed in the eye and epidermal melanocytes. This protein encoded by the GPR143 gene, whose variants can lead to Ocular albinism type 1.

The GPR143 gene is regulated by the Microphthalmia-associated transcription factor.

L-DOPA is an endogenous ligand for OA1.

== Interactions ==
GPR143 has been shown to interact with GNAI1.
