= Edward Nettleship =

British ophthalmologist (1845–1913)

- drawing by Augustus John
- Born: 3 March 1845; Kettering
- Died: 30 October 1913

Edward Nettleship FRS FCS (3 March 1845 – 30 October 1913) was an English ophthalmologist.

He was a native of Kettering. After finishing his medical studies at King's College London, Nettleship became an assistant to Jonathan Hutchinson (1828–1913) at the London Hospital, and a coworker with Warren Tay (1843–1927) at the Moorfields Eye Hospital. Later, he spent nearly twenty years at St. Thomas Hospital in London, where he was mentor to Charles Howard Usher (1865–1942). At St. Thomas, he was an ophthalmic surgeon and lecturer. The Nettleship Medal of the Ophthalmological Society was created in his honor.

Nettleship is remembered for his work with hereditary eye disorders. He made important contributions in the research of ocular albinism, retinitis pigmentosa and hereditary night blindness. Prior to specializing in ophthalmology, Nettleship studied veterinary medicine and dermatology, and in 1869 provided an early description of urticaria pigmentosa.

Of his five brothers, the eldest was the noted classical scholar Henry Nettleship, the second was the noted artist John Trivett Nettleship, and the youngest was the noted philosopher Richard Lewis Nettleship.

== See also ==
- Nettleship-Falls syndrome
