= Overstone Kondowe =

Malawian politician

Member of Parliament for Nkhotakota North East
- Incumbent
- Assumed office 5 November 2021
- Preceded by: Martha Chanjo Lunji

Personal details
- Party: Malawi Congress Party

Overstone Kondowe is a Malawi Congress Party politician who has been the Member of Parliament (MP) for Nkhotakota North East since 2021. He is the country's first MP with albinism. He was a Presidential Advisor on Persons with Disabilities.

Kondowe was elected to the National Assembly in a by-election following the death of the constituency's previous MP Martha Chanjo Lunji of the Democratic Progressive Party.
