= Ocular albinism type 1 =

Most common type of ocular albinism

- Other names: Nettleship–Falls syndrome
- Ocular albinism type 1 is inherited in an X-linked recessive manner
- Specialty: Endocrinology

Ocular albinism type 1 (OA1) is the most common type of ocular albinism, with a prevalence rate of 1:50,000. It is an inheritable classical Mendelian type X-linked recessive disorder wherein the retinal pigment epithelium lacks pigment while hair and skin appear normal. Since it is usually an X-linked disorder, it occurs mostly in males, while females are carriers unless they are homozygous. About 60 missense and nonsense mutations, insertions, and deletions have been identified in Oa1. Mutations in OA1 have been linked to defective glycosylation and thus improper intracellular transportation.

The eponyms of the name "Nettleship–Falls syndrome" are the ophthalmologists Edward Nettleship and Harold Francis Falls.

== Signs and symptoms ==
OA1 is recognized by many different symptoms. Reduced visual acuity is accompanied by involuntary movements of the eye termed as nystagmus. Astigmatism is a condition wherein there occurs significant refractive error. Moreover, ocular albino eyes become crossed, a condition called 'lazy eyes' or strabismus. Since very little pigment is present the iris becomes translucent and reflects light back. It appears green to violet. However, the most important part of the eye, the fovea which is responsible for acute vision, does not develop properly, probably indicating the role of melanin in the development stages of the eye. Some affected individuals may also develop photophobia/photodysphoria. All these symptoms are due to lack of pigmentation of the retina. Moreover, in an ocular albino eye, nerves from back of the eye to the brain may not follow the usual pattern of routing. In an ocular albino eye, more nerves cross from back of the eye to the opposite side of the brain instead of going to both sides of the brain as in a normal eye. An ocular albino eye appears blueish pink in color with no pigmentation at all unlike a normal eye. Carrier women have regions of hypo- and hyper-pigmentation in the fundus due to X-inactivation, and partial iris transillumination. They do not show any other symptoms exhibited by those affected by OA1.

== Molecular biology ==
Human Oa1 gene has been identified by positional cloning as a 40kb gene mapped to Xp22.3-Xp22.2. Later, a mouse homolog of the human Oa1 gene was also identified and cloned. It codes for a 404 amino acid long protein with up to three potential glycosylation sites. The transcript has been found to be expressing very well in retinal pigment epithelium and skin and to a much lesser extent in brain and adrenal glands.

Mutations in Oa1 have been well characterized and studied using various techniques like southern blot analyses, single-strand conformation polymorphism and sequence analysis. Most of these mutations have been reported to be occurring in the N-terminus and few in the trans-membrane regions but very rarely in the much conserved cytoplasmic C-terminus. Populations belonging to different ethnic groups have been extensively analyzed and a database has been created recording the details of mutations related to OA1. A total of 25 missense, 2 nonsense, 9 frameshift, and 5 splicing mutations have been reported till date. In addition to these mutations, there also occur several deletions in one or many of the exons of Oa1 gene, especially exon 2. These deletions are presumed to be because of unequal crossing-over due to the presence of flanking Alu regions. In some cases, the entire Oa1 gene is deleted along with other contiguous genes. Many different polymorphisms have also been detected, mainly in intron 1.

Tissue-specific control of Oa1 transcription is by a 617bp long E-box region bound by Mitf. Mitf has been shown to regulate expression of many melanosomal genes like TYR and TRP-1 through the E-box motif (CATGTG). Vetrini et al. have used adenoviral vectors to study tissue-specificity of Oa1 transcription through Mitf and observed that this regulation in conserved in human Oa1 gene.

=== Albinism ===
The term albinism [L. albus means 'white'] refers to a heterogeneous group of congenital disorders in melanin pigment biogenesis. Pigmentation process maybe affected in one or many ways due to mutations. Abnormal pigmentation maybe at the level of embryogenesis in regions where melanocytes fail to populate. The melanin biosynthetic pathway may also be affected due to mutations. Sometimes one or many of the genes responsible for biogenesis of organelles may be mutated.

Albinism may manifest itself as oculocutaneous (OCA) or just ocular (OA). There occur at least ten different types of OCA and four types of OA. OCA refers to a group of autosomal recessive disorders in which melanin is reduced or even absent leading to pale skin with increased risk of skin cancer. OCA1 is caused due to mutations in tyrosinase gene affecting its catalytic or synthetic activity. OCA2 is a condition where TYR gene is not mutated but the P polypeptide is. Mutational defects in TRP-1 protein leads to OCA3.

Ocular albinism results from defects in the melanin system, which may arise from either defects in the OA1 receptor, or mutations of either the Tyr gene or P transporter.

=== Structure of OA1 protein ===
Human Oa1 gene product was initially identified as a 60kDa protein formed from a 46-48kDa precursor. The OA1 disease is due to defect in the OA1 receptor. This receptor has been shown to be similar to class C G- protein coupled receptors (GPCR). OA1 receptor has a characteristic GPCR structure-7 transmembrane helices with 3 cytoplasmic loops and 3 extracellular loops and an extracellular N- terminus and cytoplasmic C-terminus. Recently the ligand activating this receptor was found. A recent computational work has provided some insight into the three-dimensional structure of this protein and its dynamic interactions with its known ligands.

=== Localization of the OA1 protein ===
Shen, et al. created fusion proteins between OA1 and GFP. Melanosomal localization of OA1 has been confirmed by immuno-electron microscopy and other techniques alike. Localization patterns of wild type OA1-GFP and mutated OA1-GFP were compared. The wild type OA1 localized to late endosomal or lysosomal compartments. This is supported by data from Samaraweera, et al. that OA1 colocalizes with Lamp1, which is a marker for late endosomal compartment. Hence, OA1 might traffick itself out of this compartment to the melanosomes.

In addition to retina and melanoma, OA1 protein product was also detected in human pigment cells like melanosomal membrane glycoprotein. This suggests that OA1 might be involved in melanosome biogenesis. Coimmunoprecipitation studies of OA1 with G_{β} and G_{αi} in melanocyte extracts revealed its specific interaction with G_{αi}. Further study have also shown that OA1 interact specifically with G_{αi3} subtype. Moreover, since OA1 is an organellar GPCR, it may represent an unidentified pathway in the melanosome. Until recently, it was believed that the probable ligand for OA1 might be within the melanosomal lumen, maybe one of the components of the melanogenic pathway since it is so closely related to melanosome biogenesis. This has been proved now.

Studies by Samaraweera, et al. revealed OA1 as an endolysosomal protein. Schiaffino, et al. already proved that it is an integral membrane protein. Newton et al. have shown that it has three probable glycosylation sites. Furthermore, OA1 was found to be stimulated by α-melanocortin stimulating hormone but inhibited by agouti signal protein. The fact that OA1 responds to melanin modifiers indicates its probable role in melanogenesis. Just like other melanosomal proteins TYR and TRP-1, processing of OA1 also occurs in the golgi. Endogenous OA1 protein expressed by normal human melanocytes is detected as a 60kDa protein.

=== Receptor-Ligand interactions ===
Very recently the orphan OA1 receptor has been de-orphaned. Studies showed that L-DOPA is the specific ligand for the OA1 receptor. L-DOPA is a by-product of melanin biosynthetic pathway. During melanin synthesis, L-DOPA is released to the retina in the retinal pigment epithelium and is necessary for specific stages of retinal development. Activation of the OA1 receptor by L-DOPA leads to the secretion of a neurotropic factor by the retinal pigment epithelium that helps in normal retinal development.

=== Mutations ===
The OA1 mutants were classified into two major groups based on glycosylation and localization patterns. While group I consisted of normally glycosylated OA1, group II represented aberrantly glycosylated OA1 which is indistinguishable from the wild type. However, both these studies revealed that in >60% of these mutations, the protein was retained in the ER and which is assumed to be the major cause of OA1. They also revealed that the protein levels decreased drastically, probably due to misfolding of the protein in the ER. Some of the mutations reported in second and third cytoplasmic loops (these regions are known to be critical for GPCR downstream signaling) are believed to affect transduction of the signals from OA1 via G proteins.

Class	Localization	Mutations
I	Endoplasmic reticulum : missense mutations in the N-terminus	G35D, L39R
II	LAMP2 positive granules and ER	D78V, G84R, C116R, G118E, A173D, W292G
III	Lysosomal compartment	W133R, A138V, S152N, T232K, E235K

=== Functions of OA1 ===
Though the exact role of OA1 is yet to be confirmed, many studies give clues about the probable roles of OA1. The Oa1 gene product might be involved in vesicular trafficking or sorting them to the melanosomes. It is also believed to be involved in redistribution of mannose-6-phosphate receptors, thus suggesting that it is important for melanogensis. Literature shows that it plays a major role in the final stages of growth and maturation of melanosomes. This conclusion is based on the fact that there are no intermediates of melanosome-melanosome fusion and the number of melanosomes decreases only on maturation of the cell and not in the initial stages of development. A number of genes in Drosophila, like the hook gene that alter ocular pigment granules have been shown to affect lysosomal delivery. Moreover, it has been found that in normal conditions, melanosomal proteins traffic normally to late endosomes, while in the absence of OA1, they continue to accumulate in the mature melanosomes. This may mean that OA1 acts as a stop signal for melanosomal growth.

== Pathophysiology ==
Microscopic examination of retinal pigment epithelium and skin pigment cells (melanocytes) of people affected by ocular albinism type 1 reveal the presence of characteristic macromelanosomes, even though skin appears normal. Studies from Oa1 knock-out mice reveal that these giant melanosomes appear due to abnormal growth of a single melanosome and not due to aggregation or fusion of many melanosomes. These melanin macroglobules are probably formed due to failure of melanosomes to separate from the ER-golgi system with the accumulation of enzymes and other secretory proteins leading to an increase organelle size. However, Incerti, et al. contradict the above theory.

== Treatment ==
To date there is no treatment for ocular albinism, probably because little is known about the receptor function and its role in the pathophysiology of the condition. Though surgery for strabismus is sometimes helpful, there does not seem to be a sure remedy for it until the cause of ocular albinism is well established. However, with the recent discovery of the upstream ligand (L-DOPA) and the discovery of Oa1's possible downstream G alpha partner (Gai3) the Oa1 pathway is becoming clearer and future of Oa1 research looks promising.

Touloukian et al. have characterized OA1 immunologically as a melanoma/melanocyte differentiation antigen. Flow cytometry data suggests that OA1-specific T cells are all CD8+. This indicates that OA1 peptide is processed and presented on the surface of melanoma cells to be recognized by antigen-specific T cells. Moreover, recognition of OA1 by T cells induces cytokine production by the OA1-specific T cells. This means that OA1 is a potential target for melanoma vaccines.
