= Under the Same Sun =

Christian charitable organization

Under The Same Sun (UTSS) is a Christian charitable organization that promotes the wellbeing of persons with albinism (PWA) via education and advocacy. In most African countries, PWA are discriminated against due to misconceptions around the nature of albinism and beliefs that it is related to witchcraft. In many of these countries "fatal discrimination" is occurring. It is based in Canada.
