= Persecution of people with albinism =

Persecution of people with albinism (sometimes abbreviated PWA) is human sacrifice based on the belief that certain body parts of albinistic people hold supernatural powers when used as magical ingredients. Such beliefs are present in some parts of the African Great Lakes region, and have been exploited by witch doctors who use such body parts as ingredients in religious rituals which are claimed to bring prosperity (this phenomenon is known as muti or medicine murder).

As a result, people with albinism have been persecuted, killed and dismembered. At the same time, people with albinism have also been ostracised and even killed for exactly the opposite reason, because they are presumed to be cursed and bring bad luck. The persecutions of people with albinism take place mostly in Sub-Saharan Africa communities, especially within East Africa.

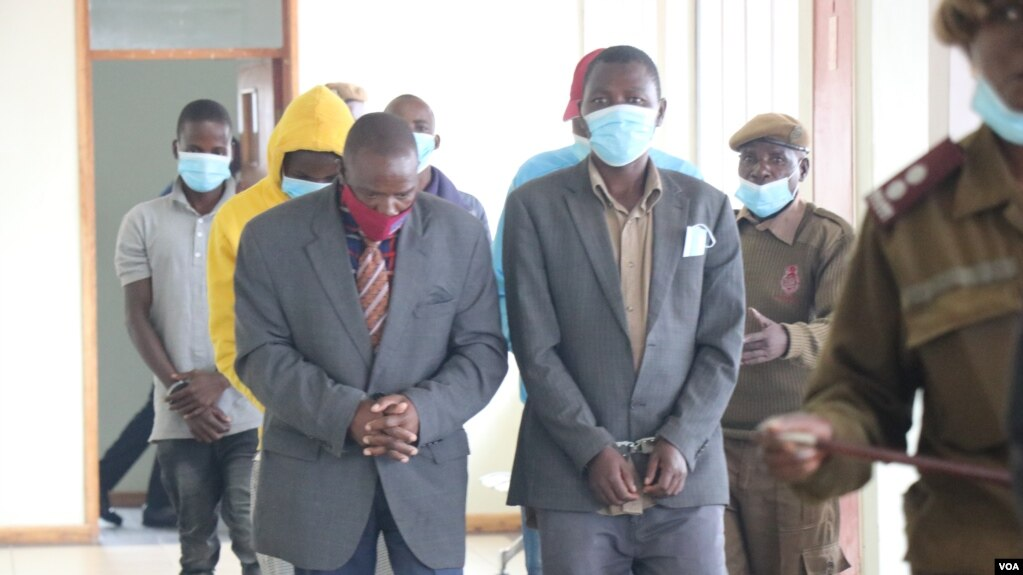
Albino attackers led to Dorothy Kamanga's court in Blantyre in 2022

Albinism is a genetically inherited condition which is rare and worldwide it affects approximately one in twenty thousand people. Although rare in the western world, albinism is quite common in sub-Saharan Africa, likely as a result of consanguineous alliances. Both parents, who may or may not be albinos themselves, must carry the gene if it is to be passed on to the child. Albinism occurs in both males and females and is not specific to any race or ethnic group. Statistics show that fifty percent of albinistic people in Tanzania have a known albinistic relative, although very few understand or are educated about the genetic causes of this condition.

Many believe it is a spiritual punishment and that people with the condition could be contagious, which is often the view of even members of the medical and professional community. These misconceptions, coupled with the lack of education, are some of the key reasons that albinism is so heavily persecuted. This lack of knowledge about people with albinism means that folktales and superstition in the name of witchcraft take the place of medical and scientific facts in the minds of many native Africans, with and without albinism, which in turn has major effects on the social integration of albinistic people into African society. Ninety-eight percent of albinos die by the age of forty for reasons which could easily be prevented.

== Current statistics of persecution of albinistic people ==
A 2014 report by the Dar es Salaam office of the Canadian charity Under the Same Sun, Reported Attacks of Persons with Albinism, reviewed 129 recent killings and 181 other attacks, within 23 African countries. They described cases of mutilation, violence, violation of graves and asylum-seeking.

=== Tanzania ===
In Tanzania, albinos represent one in every 1429 births, a higher rate than in other nations. In 2009, Al-Shymaa Kway-Geer, an albino member of parliament, stated that there were 6,977 registered albinos in Tanzania. A 2008 study, estimated that there may have been 17,000 undocumented in Tanzania. A number of albinos have migrated to the Dar es Salaam area, as they feel safer in an urban setting. Albinos are especially persecuted in Shinyanga and Mwanza, where witch doctors have promoted a belief in the potential magical and superstitious properties of albinos' body parts. This can cause immense strain on families and relationships. An albino child is often seen as a bad omen and treated as unwanted. Many albino babies become victims of infanticide due to these superstitious views.

=== Malawi ===
Governmental bodies in Malawi are known for their support of punishing people associated with crimes against people with albinism.

Malawi was said to have a "steep upsurge in killings" in 2016 with 18 reported killings since November 2014, and this ignored missing persons and unreported murders. President Peter Mutharika formed a committee to study the situation. Malawi has seen graves belonging to Albino people being robbed. In 2017, police found nearly forty cases of illegal removals of the bodies of Albino people from their graves or having body parts removed from their corpses.

Another phenomenon that has begun to occur is an increase in religious leaders, police, and government officials being charged and convicted of slaying Albino people in Malawi. As of 2018, there has been speculation President Mutharika making moves toward implementing the death penalty to convicted murderers of Albino people as a way to significantly decrease the attacks being perpetrated, putting fear into those who do it for business or religious purposes and making it substantially less acceptable by witch doctors and other people who follow superstitions.

There is a death penalty in place, but it has not been put in to use since the government changed to democracy in 1994. Convicts who are given the death penalty have sat in prison for life instead. The president sees this as a way to tighten judicial control and work to eradicate the hate crimes committed against Albinos.

In 2018, Malawian MP Esther Jolobala alleged that there were significant delays in the Malawian Police Service's response to reports of crimes against albinos.

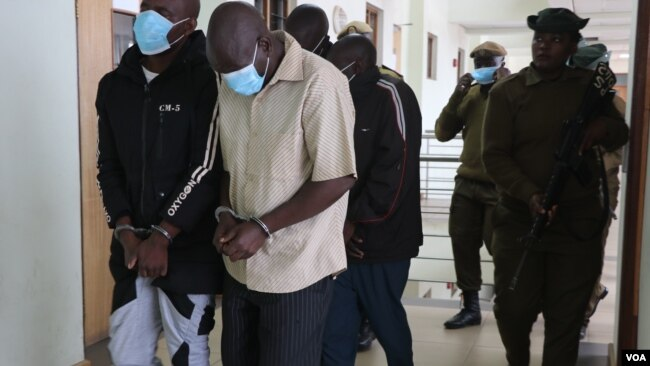
Murderers of an albino man after sentencing by Kamanga in 2022

In June 2022 Dorothy Kamanga sentenced five men to life imprisonment with hard labour in Blantyre for murdering an albino man in 2018. The five included a member of the Catholic priesthood, a member of the police and a medical worker. In this case they had extracted human tissue.

=== Zambia ===
On the report of Zambian Albinism Organisations like AFZ and others there are about 25,324 people with albinism in Zambia, according to the country's last census, conducted in 2010. "Noting the efforts made by the Zambia government to promote the welfare of PWA in the country including prohibiting racial discrimination of persons as well as offenses causing bodily harm through the Constitution as well as Penal Code of Zambia; supporting the publishing of a handbook called "Living with Albinism in Zambia: Information for children and young people" which aims to teach children about healthcare, sun damage and the differences between them and their family and peers; Including PWA in the 2010 Census of Population and Housing; Occasional purchase and free distribution of sunscreen lotions to PWA; and hosting cancer clinics where PWA go for cancer treatment covering medical bills for some of them. However, there are a number of issues that are yet to be adequately addressed." The latest killing in Zambia was reported in March 2020

== Origins of myths and superstition causing persecution of people with albinism ==
African rituals and spiritual ideas about albinism have led to the brutal murder of and attacks on innocent men, women and especially children. These ideas have been around for many generations, but in recent years witch doctors have been teaching misconceived ideas about the promise of wealth, success, and power when albino hair or limbs are used in a potion as part of witchcraft practices. This has gained public attention nationally and internationally as these crimes have been reported as crimes against human rights. "Infanticide, kidnapping, amputations, and decapitations, committed for purposes of supplying highly valued body parts used for amulets, which are then sold in underground witchcraft market." This causes great unrest and angst among the albino population, who must be protected and often live in a state of solitude simply to protect their own lives and to prevent being hunted like animals.

In 2010, US congressman Gerry Connolly introduced legislation to protect albinos and urge local governments to protect albinos, stating that "With their help and the passage of this resolution today, maybe we can bring an end to these horrific and heinous crimes."

It is clear that "the main driving forces underlying these profiling crimes are ignorance, myth, and superstition, such as the belief that individuals with albinism possess superpowers or that their body parts bestow fortune and health." It is commonly known that in many communities, predominantly in Tanzania and parts of east Africa, superstitious views derived from ancient spiritual beliefs and reinforced by local witch doctors have been carried through centuries of ritualistic practices and mythical beliefs. This creates a serious risk to the lives of persons with albinism as the people believe it will bring them wealth, power, success, or health depending on the variances of interpretation. Senior police officers claim that these body parts may be sold for as much as US$75,000 on the black market for a set of arms, legs, ears, and genitals from an individual with albinism.

There was an extensive amount of albino murders in the 2000s, especially in Burundi and Tanzania. In 2007, more than seventy documented killings took place and one hundred and fifty body parts of albinos were reported to have been chopped off. Now the number of killings is well over one hundred, with low conviction rates, and albinos continue to have limbs severed, leaving many crippled or severely maimed, traumatised and tortured in the process.

This threat to albinos has the potential to cause extreme trauma and stress in their daily lives, which are already impacted by the stress of their condition, affecting skin and eyesight, placing albinos in a constant state of insecurity and distrust. According to Navi Pillay, the United Nations High Commissioner for Human Rights, because of the social and educational exclusion which can often occur there are often very low education levels in albinos, so that they lack social and economic tools to live productive lives. It also "is a common belief that albinos have low brain capacity and are unable to function at the same level as 'normal people'.

Their ability to learn is often deficient due to the fact that one hundred percent of albinos suffer from some form of visual impairment and there often are not sufficient educational facilities, learning supplies or funding to support children with limited sight. This causes extensive bullying, exclusion from peer groups, low self-esteem and confidence, along with emotional and mental illness stemming from rejection by society, and often family members who harbor superstitious myths about albinos. It is clearly revealed that no matter what mythical or spiritual mantra a person may be following or believing about albinos there is a general view in "nearly all cultures in the region of East Africa held and some still hold the view that albinos are less desirable beings who are less than human."

Homes and schools specifically for albinos, such as Buhangija Albino School, have been created as safe environments for learning, growing and permanently residing. Many children fear to ever return to their families, believing that they may be killed by even their closest relatives. Ukerewe Island is a home to a large community of people with albinism where 62 albinos reside, most likely to remain in solitude and away from albino hunters.

The UN report submitted as part of the Human Rights Council resolution 23/13 of 13 June 2013 states that albinos are often regarded as "ghosts and not human beings, who can be wiped off the global map." They are often persecuted as devils or people who are a bad omen or suffer from a curse. In some communities, it is "believed that contact with them will bring bad luck, sickness or death." Therefore, this is discrimination and mental and emotional persecution alone, where severe bullying of children, exclusion and abandonment occurs even without brutal physical persecution.

The issues which have created a spotlight for the Human Rights Council of the United Nations are the murder of albinos for medicine and dismemberment, and attacks, and murder of persons with albinism. Another myth that imposes a risk on people with albinism is the belief that "sexual intercourse with a woman or a girl with albinism can cure HIV/AIDS." Sacrifice of albinos has believed also to "appease the god of the mountain" when fear of a volcano eruption is possible, and it is believed that pulling the hair of albinos can bring good luck. It has also been reported that "miners use the bones of persons with albinism as amulets or bury them where they are drilling for gold. The attacks which occur usually result in the death or severe mutilation of the albino, which according to the Human rights council can in "some cases involve trade in organs, trafficking in persons and sale of children, infanticide and abandonment of children."

== Action against persecution ==
With escalating killings, President Kikwete publicly and repeatedly condemned witch doctors, their helpers and middlemen, and the clients, which include members of the police force, for these murders. Victims include children snatched or abducted from their parents. The killers and their accomplices use hair, arms, legs, skin, eyes, genitals, and blood in rituals or for witch potions.

The United Nations High Commissioner for Human Rights has published a preliminary report regarding discrimination which has been directed toward people with albinism. This report has been submitted as part of the Human Rights Council resolution 23/13 of 13 June 2013. It reinforced that "states would adopt specific measures to protect and preserve the rights to life and security of persons with albinism, as well as their right not to be subject to torture and ill treatment, and ensure their access to adequate health care, employment, education and justice."

The discrimination against albinos is often demonstrated by family members and relatives especially at birth, and ill-treatment by general society is widespread where there are severe issues of social exclusion and stigma. The Resolution 23/13 explains the Human Rights council's concerns about "attacks against persons with albinism". The Council encouraged the United Nations High Commissioner for Human Rights (OHCHR) to submit a report. Navi Pillay is the current United Nations High Commissioner for Human Rights. As the representative, on 11 March 2014 she submitted a message which overviewed the current status of discrimination against persons with albinism and possible pathways for change and development in protection of albinos. "People with albinism have the right to live without fear or bullying, discrimination, social exclusion, killing and dismemberment." This footage was published on 13 March 2014 to overview the current situation surrounding albinos who live in fear of being murdered or captured for the purposes of murder medicine and witch doctors belief in the magical potential of albino hair and limbs.

A key issue is the influence of educating the public to encourage the removal of the social stigma associated with albinos in a society which does not completely understand that albinism is not a curse or a spiritual ghost, but simply a skin condition. In Zimbabwe albinos have been given the name sope which indicated that they are possessed by evil spirits, and in Tanzania they are known as nguruwe meaning 'pig', or zeru which means 'ghost'. The Report discusses the "most serious human rights violations faced by persons with albinism, primarily focusing on the ritual killings and attacks to which they are subjected." It also includes recommendations to the international community and member states action towards persons with albinism.

== Future plans ==
International federation Secretary General Bekele Geleta states that "Albinism is one of the most unfortunate vulnerabilities… and needs to be addressed immediately at international level." This is a cry for international exposure and help to ensure that people suffering from albinism can be protected from inhumane killings and to be sheltered from the merciless hunters of albino body parts for their potions and spiritual medicine. "The main issues that should be addressed include skin cancer prevention education, stigma and discrimination denouncement, and swift prosecution of albino hunters and their sponsors."

It is clear that albinos are facing many issues in their lives, and must be protected on the basis of human rights even if they look different and unlike any other race on earth. It is "imperative to inform the medical community and the general national and international public about the tragedies faced by albinos to protect them from skin cancer and ritualistic murders by individuals seeking wealth through clandestine markets perpetuating witchcraft."

A number of steps were taken by the government to protect the albino population. The president ordered a crackdown on witchdoctors in the spring of 2008. In addition, an albino woman, Al-Shymaa Kway-Geer, was named to become a member of the parliament, the first albino in such a position in the history of Tanzania. Police have also been advised to generate lists of albinos and provide special protection for them.

To foil graverobbers, graves of the albinistic were to be sealed with concrete. However, by October 2008, killings had not abated, and while some suspects had been apprehended, no convictions had taken place. It was estimated that over 50 murders had taken place since March 2007, many of them in the mining and fishing communities near Lake Victoria, especially at Mwanza, Shinyanga and Mara.

In January 2009, "Prime Minister Pinda had declared war on the albino hunters, and in an effort to stop the trade in albino body parts he had revoked the licenses of all the country's witch doctors who use the body parts in their black magic fetishes."

=== Convictions against albino hunters ===
The first ever conviction for the killing of an albino in Tanzania occurred on 23 September 2009 at the High Court in Kahama. This was a "landmark verdict" was due to the fact that there have been more than 50 murders known at this time and this was the first actual conviction. The conviction came about following the murder and mutilation of a 14-year-old boy, Matatizo Dunia, who was attacked by three men in Bukombe district in Shinyanga Region in December 2008.

The men carried Dunia from his home late at night before brutally murdering him. One of them was later found with Dunia's leg in his possession. The rest of Dunia's body parts were located concealed in shrubbery. The men confessed a desire to sell Dunia's parts to a witch doctor, yet despite this, their legal team had not anticipated the death sentence of hanging which the three men would receive.

The Canada- and Tanzania-based Under The Same Sun albinism activist organisation praised the breakthrough but its founder Peter Ash remarked: "This is one conviction. There are 52 other families still awaiting justice". The Tanzania Albino Society's chairman Ernest Kimaya called for the hanging to be made public to further demonstrate to others that the issue of killing albinos was to be taken seriously.

This issue with witchcraft and its power and influence is that a witch doctor has, as he is almost always "revered by society as ultimate truth". Most tribes in ancient times would have committed infanticide upon an albino child seeing it as a bad omen, practiced by the Sukuma, the Digo and the Maasai. However, in some tribes the albinos were made the sacrifices of offerings to the gods or for such uses as potions which is what they are still hunted for today in the 21st century. "One of the most dangerous myths and the crux of recent attacks against PWA is that their body parts can be made into potions that give good luck and wealth to its users."

In 2006 some of the first publicly reported killings were spoken about in the media, such as 34-year-old albino woman, Arithi, who was murdered with her arms and legs hacked off and sold. Some cases which have been key in recent years firstly occurred in 2008 when a Tanzanian man tried to sell his albino wife for a price of US$3,000 to Congolese businessmen. Although the businessmen managed to escape their arrest, Interpol has been assigned to attempt to track these men. This is what led to President Jakaya Kikewere ordering a tightening of police and protection from prosecution, however due to corruption there is still proof that even policeman are being bribed and "bought off" to turn a blind eye to certain crimes if they are receiving pecuniary gain. Although according to BBC News 170 witch doctors have been arrested for involvement in inhumane interactions and intentions with albinos.

Another example which occurred where two mothers who were attacked by gangs with machetes in order to get to their albino children. The men broke into a refugee house known as the Lugufu Camp in Kigoma in search of the children; although the children remained untouched the women received severe injuries. A further case uncovered by US congressman Gerry Connolly was the November 2008 in Ruyigi, Burundi, where the case of a 6-year old albino girl who was shot dead and her head and limbs were hacked off, leaving only her dismembered torso.

== Organisations to prevent persecution ==
Many organisations have been set up to help protect and provide for communities with albinism. Films have been produced to encourage, educate and create an international understanding of the trials which persons with albinism are facing in a modern world still dealing with ancient rituals and practices which encourage murder for medicine. This is against all international human rights legislation and therefore it is important that persons with albinism are collectively protected. Organisations such as National Organization for Albinism and Hypopigmentation (NOAH), Tanzania Albino Centre (TAC), based in Arusha, Tanzania; aiming to "improve the lives of albinos with educational and medical assistance so that they may live safe, accepted, and prosperous lives in the society of their choice."

Other groups include the Albinism Foundation Zambia (AFZ), based in Lusaka, founded by musician John Chiti, who is diagnosed with Albinism, Assisting Children in Need (ACN); and Under the Same Sun where Ash, also having albinism himself, states his aspirations and purpose for the project: "I have a dream that one day in Africa, people with albinism will take their rightful place throughout every level of society, and that the days of discrimination against persons with albinism will be a faint memory!" The Vision of Albinism Foundation Zambia is, according to their website: "Persons with Albinism in Zambia enjoying and exercising their rights and fundamental freedoms on an equal basis with the rest of society without any form of discrimination on the basis of their condition"

The International Federation of Red Cross (IFRC) is a key part of the albino protection movement who are working to integrate persons with albinism back into society safely in Burundi "striving to minimize their vulnerability to hunters, skin cancer, and educational and social marginalization." The IFRC particularly works with protecting mothers and children who are fearing persecution and they assist them in providing safe homes and protection where children are frightened of attackers and by providing a special arena for the albinos it ensures safety protection and an environment of love, understanding of one another all with albinism, and unity in the battle against persecution and discrimination.

The Red Cross have made it very clear in their publications that the government must also take drastic steps in protection of persons with albinism to stop the persecution. They have stated that it is imperative that the government strives to "Ensure effective legal protection for people with albinism, use local administrative structures to locate and protect albino people in hiding and conduct public anti-discrimination campaigns and extend medical services to albinos in need."

Asante Mariamu is another organisation which was created after the survival of Mariamu Staford from an anti-albino attack which is determined to ensure that there is "swift prosecution and convictions of their killers" and therefore encouraging justice. This story was presented to the US House of Representatives in March 2010 where US Congressman Gerry Connolly was impacted by this horrific story and "moved me to take action". He introduced a bill to take action to severe violence being performed against persons with albinism in east Africa and to bring justice and punishment to perpetrators. He spoke to the house in March 2010 urging his colleagues "to join me and Mariamu Stanford in bringing international attention to this horrific abuse of human rights."

This legislation condemns any injury, murder or mutilation of persons with albinism and specifically urges the local east African government especially in Tanzania and Burundi "to take immediate action to prevent further violence against persons with albinism." There are many more which are working on protecting persons with albinism from persecution, and providing adequate health care, sun protection and learning facilities to ensure that persons with albinism are treated fairly and with all human rights, and not hunted as animals in fear of their life.

Albino Awareness day has also been created by Dr Aisha Sethi who is an assistant professor of dermatology in the Pritzker School of Medicine which is celebrated on 4 May each year. The President has also appointed Al-Shymaa Kway-Geer, himself a person with albinism, as an MP who seeks to be a voice in the Tanzanian parliament for protection against persecution of persons with albinism in society and encourages facilities and support of their physical, medical, and education protection and enhancement.

=== Under the Same Sun ===
Under the Same Sun is a Canadian-founded organization with support focused on Tanzania and based in Dar es Salam, founded in 2008 by Peter Ash with a vision to "promote via advocacy and education, the wellbeing of persons who are often marginalised or misunderstood. We are driven by the belief that all persons have intrinsic value and since they are created in the image of God."

They are acting upon the moral and human rights values to support victims to end the discrimination and persecution of innocent persons with albinism. According to Under the Same Sun, to eradicate attacks against persons with albinism, "it is necessary to focus on eliminating reliance on witchcraft beliefs by strengthening the provision of infrastructure such as schools and hospitals while enhancing the sense of fairness by improving on the system of justice."

Regaining persons with albinism their rights to being treated as human, fairly as functioning members of society who may look different and suffer severe vulnerabilities die to their physical condition, but do not deserve to be murdered or hurt in any way because of ancient myths claiming sacrifice of these people will create future benefit for another person.

=== Albinism Foundation Zambia ===
Albinism Foundation Zambia is based in Lusaka, Zambia. The founder of the Albinism Foundation of Zambia (AFZ) is John Chiti as the first person with albinism to come out in the lime light in Zambia as awarded musician. He then began to mobilise the albinism community using his own resources and later formed this foundation through which they could profile their concerns on issues of governance to government and stake holders. The Albinism Foundation Zambia was thus established in 2008 as a non-governmental organisation that works to promote the welfare of persons with albinism in Zambia. It is also the first albinism organization in Zambia.

=== Amnesty International ===
Amnesty International has run several campaigns against the persecution and discrimination of persons with albinism. 'Albinism in Malawi: Stop the Killings' is a campaign run by the organisation that was started to "stop ritual murders of people with Albinism".

== Films highlighting persecution of albinism ==
Films which have been created are also helping to raise awareness and tell the stories of persecuted persons with albinism, beginning with In My Genes, a 2009 Kenyan documentary directed by Lupita Nyong'o (later a key actor from the 2013 film Twelve Years a Slave). It was followed in 2010 by White and Black: Crimes of Color, by Canadian filmmaker Jean-François Méan, which tells the story of Vicky Ntetema, a Tanzanian journalist who investigated the trade for albinotic body parts in Tanzania. This film became the cornerstone of a national campaign sponsored by Under the Same Sun to end the wave of violence. After the film's broadcast, the murder rate, which had been steady for three years, dropped by 90%.

White Shadow, a German–Italian–Tanzanian 2013 drama film written, produced and directed by Noaz Deshe, drew international attention to the issue, screening at various film festivals, winning the Lion of the Future at the Venice festival. Also released in 2013, In the Shadow of the Sun, a documentary filmed in Tanzania over the course of six years by Harry Freeland, featured the struggles of Josephat Torner, a campaigner for de-mystification of the superstitions about albinistic people and their use for witchcraft; and teenaged Vedastus, who hopes to survive the persecution of persons with albinism to adulthood.

My Colour, Your Kind, a 1998 Australian film, gives a powerful, impressionistic insight into the feelings of alienation experienced by a teenage albino Aboriginal girl. In a convent boarding school in Alice Springs, she is misunderstood and bullied by a severe, unloving nun. She escapes in dreams and eventually in reality to her mother where she feels at peace.

== Other African countries ==
By June 2008 killings had been reported in neighboring Kenya and possibly also the Democratic Republic of Congo.

In October 2008 AFP reported on the further expansion of killings of albinos to the Ruyigi region of Burundi. Body parts of the victims are then smuggled to Tanzania where they are used for witch doctor rituals and potions. Albinos have become "a commercial good", commented Nicodeme Gahimbare in Ruyigi, who established a local safe haven in his fortified house.

By 2010 cases had also been reported from Eswatini.

A September 2026 report in The Guardian stated that in Madagascar, 13 people with albinism, primarily children, had been killed for their body parts that year.

=== South Africa ===
==== Biology ====
Oculocutaneous albinism is the most common gene type of albinism inherited disorders among the Bantu population of southern Africa. It occurs at a frequency of 1:4000 and is caused by a mutation in the OCA2 gene. The incidence in Sotho people in northern South Africa is at its highest, with a ratio of 1:1500 in neonates. Albinism is the largest cause of childhood visual impairment in northern South Africa with a frequency of 1:1900 among the black population. Statistics on albinism in South Africa are largely incomplete however, studies quoted by the World Health Organisation in 2006 reported that 1:4000 were born with albinism, compared to about 1:20 000 worldwide.

South African human geneticist Trefor Jenkins has made vast contributions to assist in understanding the social and cultural milieu of albinism, the medical risks and implications, resolving the molecular basis and aetiology for OCA2 in Southern Africa.

==== Skin cancer ====
Children with albinism in rural areas are exposed to high levels of ultraviolet light without the adequate protective gear resulting in skin damage. Only 12% of public schools provided SPF15 sunscreen for children with albinism. Squamous cell carcinoma of the head and neck is the most common type of cutaneous tumours in African patients with albinism. Non melanoma cancers, namely basal and squamous cell carcinoma, which are usually rare in black populations, are common among the vulnerable group living with albinism. A South African study of 111 participants with OCA revealed that 23% of these participants developed skin cancer with the head area being the most commonly affected site.

Many people with albinism from rural areas like Eastern Cape province are unaware of the precautionary measures required to protect their skin. Dr Willie Visser, head of the dermatology division at Stellenbosch University and Tygerberg Hospital, said that while white South Africans presented with skin cancer only after the age of 60, most albinos presented with skin cancer as young as 20. Government health facilities are required to provide sunblock lotion to albinos on a monthly basis. However, this need is not always met due to stock-outs and lack of knowledge on the part of health workers.

==== Racial classification ====
Racial appearance and descent played a key role in the racial classification process during Apartheid. Additionally, different sociological and psychological give skin colour its many connotations. Skin colour is traditionally an instant indicator of identifying race and racial differences. Traditional definitions of race suggest that race and colour are inseparable, for people with albinism race and colour are not linked. Though colour and race are used interchangeably, they remain independent grounds for discrimination. Individuals living with albinism should be protected against unfair discrimination on the basis of their race as well as their skin tone. Individuals living with albinism are exposed to discrimination, stigmatisation and prejudice based on their colour as well as their race. Skin tone discrimination may be interracial or it can be intraracial. Scott argues that because current classifications of race do not afford people living with albinism adequate protection, a new category of colour should be proposed. Mswela argues that additional divisions and classifications of race will reinforce problems associated with race.

==== Discrimination ====
The difference in appearance in the child with albinism creates socialisation and adaption problems. The distinctive phenotypical difference of black (African) people with albinism and the rest of the population group leads to barriers in social integration thus ostracism. South Africans living with albinism are among the most vulnerable in the country and there is hardly a serious attempt to protect these citizens from human rights violations, violent crimes, and threats. The extent of violent crimes for people with albinism is not as high as other African countries however, surges of violent crimes against people with albinism have been noted.

Their sensitivity to sunlight, which limits the extent to which they can participate in outdoor activities, contributes to the physical and social isolation of children living with albinism. There has been an obligation and responsibility placed on the government to protect vulnerable people after the constitutional court decision on the Carmichele v Minister of Safety & Security case. The litigation in the Carmichele case creates a strategy for bringing a precautionary suit against the state based on the contention that the state has a duty to protect persons with albinism from violent acts. The South African government has designated the month of September as Albinism Awareness month. Thando Hopa is a 24-year-old Public Prosecutor and model living with albinism. She is one of the few black albino models and albinism activists in the world.

==== Myths ====
Many African communities depend on traditional explanations of albinism rather than the biomedical explanation. This often leads to a negative socialisation of the individual with albinism. People living with albinism are often referred to by derogatory names such as 'inkawu', the Nguni term for white baboon, 'isishawa' a Zulu translation of a person who is cursed as well as 'zeru zeru' which means ghost like. The Swahili term 'zeru' is also commonly used in Tanzania.

Three people were convicted of the murder of 20 year old Thandazile Mpunzi, including her 17 year old boyfriend. The boyfriend lured Mpunzi to an isolated area on the afternoon of 1 August 2015 in the Phelandaba area of Emanguzi in northern KwaZulu-Natal province, South Africa, where she was murdered and dismembered. They planned to sell the body parts of Mpunzi for a fortune. They claimed that a traditional healer told them they would get rich if they mixed Mpunzi's blood and parts with muthi. Two of the accused pleaded guilty of murder and were sentenced to 20 years' imprisonment. Numerous accounts of murdered as well as missing people with albinism are reported. The trading of albino body parts has become a lucrative business.

== International reaction ==
After events involving murders of albino people by three Tanzanian men had been publicised by the BBC and others, the European Parliament strongly condemned the killing of albinos in Tanzania on 4 September 2008. The U.S. House of Representatives passed H. Resolution 1088, introduced by Rep. Gerry Connolly (D, VA), by a vote of 418–1 on 22 February 2010. The resolution condemns the attacks and killings; categorises them as human rights violations, and urges the governments of Tanzania and Burundi to vigorously prosecute such cases and to conduct educational campaigns to combat the superstitious beliefs that underlie the violent attacks.

== See also ==
- Child sacrifice in Uganda
- Discrimination based on skin color
- International Albinism Awareness Day
- Medicine murder
- Muti killings
- Witchcraft accusations against children in Africa
