= Albinism in popular culture =

Portrayal and stereotypes of people or animals with albinism

Albinism as a condition has been portrayed in a variety of ways in popular culture, including several stereotypes and myths related to persons with albinism.

Types of albinism include:

- Oculocutaneous albinism. Affects the skin, hair, and eyes. Around 1 in 70 people have a mutation in an OCA gene. There are several subtypes of OCA.
- Ocular albinism. Affects the eyes, causing blindness.
- Hermansky–Pudlak syndrome. Effects include a bleeding disorder, IBS, and fibrocystic lung conditions.
- Chédiak–Higashi syndrome. Similar to OCA but doesn't affect the whole body.
- Griscelli syndrome. Causes immune and neurological issues. Griscelli syndrome usually results in death within the first decade of life.

Conversely, a number of real people with albinism have risen to fame) especially in popular music and fashion modeling (though, as in the case of the Winter brothers, may themselves be the subject of "evil albino" parody). Albino animals capture public imagination and wonder as zoo attractions, and even in the wild can attract popular, positive attention).

== The "Evil Albino" Stereotype ==
Albinism organisations and others have expressed criticism over the portrayal of individuals with albinism in popular culture, specifically in movies and fictional works, citing the overwhelmingly negative depiction. There is concern that such depictions could increase social bias and discrimination against individuals with albinism. This phenomenon is often referred to as the "evil albino" plot device.

The "evil albino" stereotype or stock character is a villain in fiction who is depicted as being albinistic (or displaying physical traits usually associated with albinism, even if the term is not used), with the specific purpose of distinguishing the villain in question from the heroes by means of appearance. Traits of albinism commonly associated with the evil albino stereotype include pale skin, platinum blonde hair, and blue or pink-to-red eyes. Notably absent from most depictions is impaired vision, which is often experienced (depending on the type of albinism) by real people with albinism.

The stereotype has become sufficiently well-recognized to be considered a cliché. In response to the "albino gunmen" characters in The Da Vinci Code and The Matrix Reloaded, albinistic actor Dennis Hurley wrote, produced, and starred in a short film parody, The Albino Code, where he played up the stereotypes, illustrated a typical example of real-world prejudice, and pointed out that the vision problems associated with albinism would make a successful career as a hitman highly improbable. In The Big Over Easy, author Jasper Fforde includes an "albino community" protest against albino bias among his fictional news clippings, most of which satirise stock characters and hackneyed plot devices. Chicago Tribune movie reviewer Mark Caro says of this character type that it is someone "who looks albino and thus, in movie shorthand, must be vicious". The National Organisation for Albinism and Hypopigmentation (NOAH) has stated that there were a total of sixty-eight films from 1960 to 2006 featuring an "evil albino".

The "evil albino" stereotype may also have its roots in Neolithic Eastern Europe, where some cultures depicted Death as a pallid woman with light hair. Fear of vampires and other legendary undead with a deathly pallor, especially in European folklore, could also have contributed to albino bias. The phenomenon may also have been influenced by attitudes towards people with albinism in Africa or Jamaica, where those with that condition are sometimes regarded as cursed or magical. Dermatologist Dr. Vail Reese theorizes that albino bias may be part of a broader Hollywood pattern of equating or at least linking skin disorders and appearance problems with villainy.

Another explanation may be sought in respective ideals of ugliness – most "evil albinos" appear in works of fiction from the West. In fiction from Japan, where ideals call for as pale skin as possible, characters with albinism or associated traits are more frequently sympathetic than in American and British fiction. This is not to say that Japanese popular culture has not depicted "evil albinos". However, such characters in Japanese fiction are often bishōnen or bishōjo whose beautiful appearance gives contrast to their evil character. Use of albinistic features to indicate villains in Hollywood films appears to have begun in the 1960s, and may be related to the popularity of tanning (and thus a decrease in pale skin being seen as attractive) in this period.

One of the oldest perceived literary examples of albino bias was H. G. Wells's depiction of the main character in his 1897 science-fiction novel The Invisible Man, who was able to become invisible using his scientific discoveries only because he already lacked natural pigmentation; aberrant even before his experimentation, he subsequently became completely deranged.

Albino bias is also alleged in modern times. For example, the 2003 Warner Bros movie The Matrix Reloaded featured two sociopathic characters with pale skin and white hair frequently interpreted to be albinos despite studio declarations that they are not. Positive depictions of albinos in mass culture are rarer, though one example is the 1995 film Powder which depicts an exceptionally gifted albinistic youth and the cruelty he endures from "normal" people because of his differences. In recent years, the National Organization for Albinism and Hypopigmentation (NOAH) has spoken out against albino bias in the United States. Albinistic actor Michael C. Bowman, of Me, Myself and Irene, has said, "Kids all over this country are being affected in a very negative and harmful way because of the sloppiness and laziness of a writer in Hollywood."

== Albinism and fiction ==
A number of movies, books and other works have been criticized for albino bias, as they associate the uncommon features of albinistic people (pale skin, white hair, and unpigmented eyes) with danger, terror, or criminality. Less frequently they are depicted as the harmless butt of jokes and ridicule, as maladjusted and undersocialized, or as "freaks". They may also actually be portrayed positively, even heroically – a more recent counter-trend.

=== Negatively portrayed characters ===
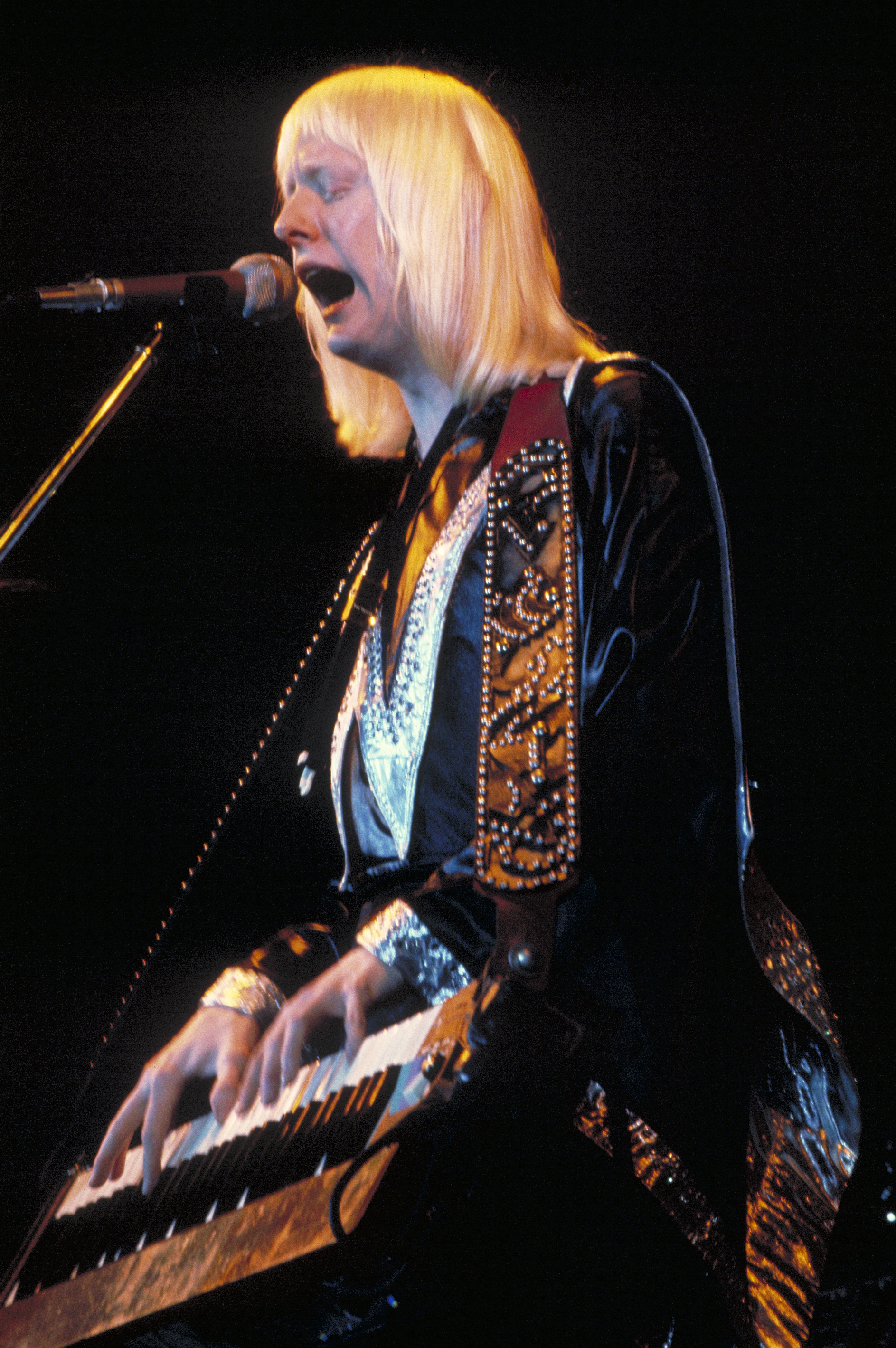

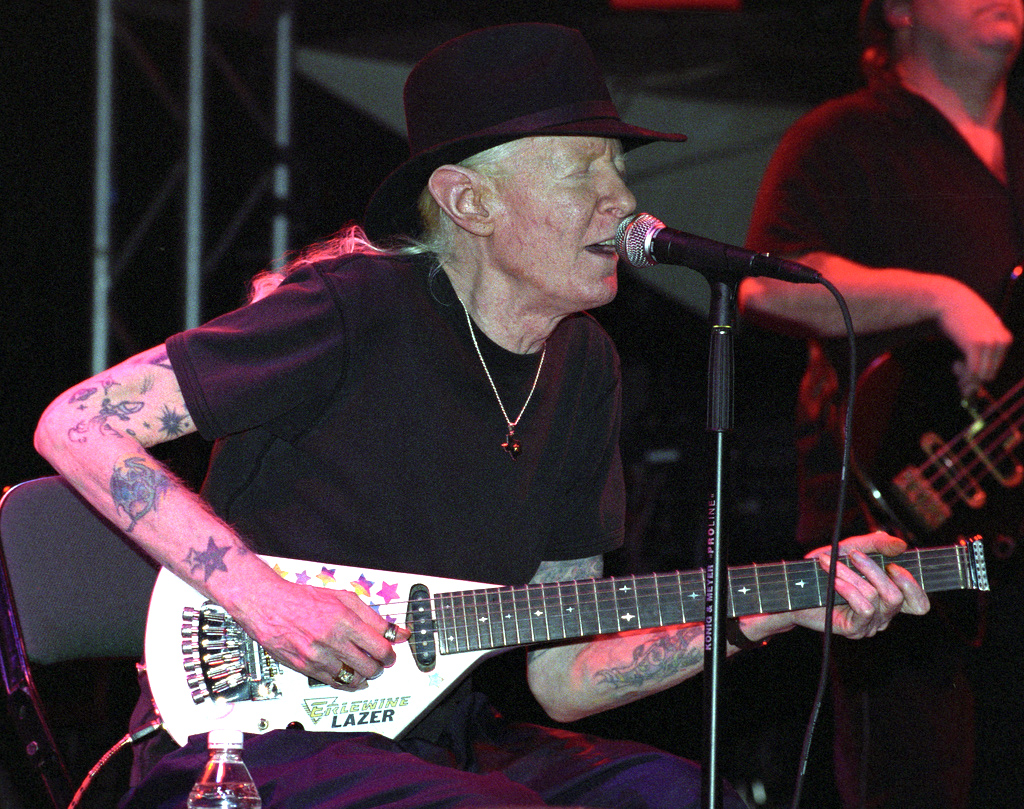
Brothers Edgar and Johnny Winter, rock musicians with albinism subject to parody as "evil albinos" in a comic book

The most common depiction of people with albinism in fiction is that of the inimical, violent villain, especially the hitman, assassin, sociopath or crime boss.

- "The Family", a cult of plague survivors are the antagonists in the film The Omega Man (1971).
- Silas, in the book The Da Vinci Code (2003) by Dan Brown, (played by Paul Bettany in the 2006 film adaptation), is described as being albinistic. He is a religious fanatic and an assassin who murders several people, although he repents at the end of the book, praying to God for mercy and forgiveness. Critics have called the portrayal "damning", "hateful", and "cruelly stereotypical". In defense, author Brown has pointed out that "Silas's skin color has nothing to do with his violent nature – he is driven to violence by others' cruelty... not by anything inherent in his physiology" and that he believes "the novel's portrayal of Silas is a compassionate exploration of how difficult albinism can be – especially for young people – and how cruelly societies can ostracize those of us who look different", going on to say he considers Silas to be the most sympathetic character in the story.
- "The Twins" (played by Adrian and Neil Rayment), in The Matrix Reloaded (2003) are considered by detractors to be the highest-profile case of "evil albino" bias to date, though said by producers to not be intended to be taken as actually albinistic.
- Edgar and Johnny Autumn, in four 1995 issues of the Jonah Hex comic book, are mutant villain brothers for the main character to fight. They were thinly-disguised caricatures of real-life albinistic musician brothers, Edgar and Johnny Winter (see images, right), who filed an unsuccessful lawsuit (Edgar Winter et al. v. DC Comics et al.). A spokesperson for Johnny Winter characterized the depiction as "picking fun at them for being albinos", while a DC Comics representative claimed that the characters were an homage.
- Griffin, the main character of The Invisible Man (1897) by H. G. Wells is of questionable sanity and a thief by nature, obsessed with colour and pigmentation due to his albinism. The text of Wells's novel implies that Griffin's invisibility formula works on him (and a white cat in an early experiment) only because of albinism. (See main article for sources.)
- Francis Davey, the vicar of Altarnun in Daphne du Maurier's novel Jamaica Inn is an albino whose status as a 'freak of nature' is explicitly linked to his rejection of conventional morality and hence his villainous actions including murder.
- Samuel Aboah from The X-Files episode "Teliko". He was a Burkinabé immigrant who, lacking a pituitary gland, harvested them from other African or African-American men to restore his skin tone. He is compared unfavourably to a vampire like creature from West African folklore (the eponymous Teliko) by a Burkinabé ambassador. He is depicted as a merciless killer with a seemingly inhuman ability to squeeze into small spaces (a la previous X-Files villain Eugene Victor Tooms)
- "Snow" (played by Billy Drago), in Vamp (1986) is the violently-inclined leader of a street gang composed of albinistic people and others with appearance problems. He meets a violent end.
- Joseph (played by Jake Busey, son of Gary Busey; see next entry), in Contact (1997) is a religious extremist turned suicide-bomber.
- Mr. Joshua (played by Gary Busey), in Lethal Weapon (1987) is a seemingly psychopathic hit man. He was specifically referred to as "albino" in the film.
- Bosie (played by Charlie Hunnam), in Cold Mountain (2003) is a U.S. Civil War-era "sneering albino killer ...[who] seems to have wandered in from a Lethal Weapon movie" – Ty Burr, Boston Globe review.
- "Bad Bob" (played by Stacy Keach) in The Life and Times of Judge Roy Bean (1972)
- "Dragon" (played by Thayer David) in The Eiger Sanction (1975) is an underworld kingpin also described as being unable to stand light and requiring frequent blood transfusions.
- "The Albino" (played by Mel Smith), in The Princess Bride (1987) is an Igor-like henchman and torturer, depicted as diseased, with visible sores.
- "Albino" (played by the genuinely albinistic Victor Varnado), in End of Days (1999) is a menacing "servant of Satan" who meets a grisly death.
- "Whitey" Jackson a.k.a. "The Albino" (played by William Frankfather), in Foul Play (1978) is another heavily armed killer, this time in a comedy.
- "Tombstone", in the Spider-Man comics is an African-American with albinism. He is a mob hitman. (See main article for sources.)
- "Tobias Whale" a DC Comics African-American albinistic mobster whose villainy induces character Jefferson Pierce to become the superhero "Black Lightning". (See main article for sources.)
- Moke (played by Dar Robinson), in Stick (1985) is a ruthless criminal, who likes to shoot people in the back
- Judge Holden, in Cormac McCarthy's Blood Meridian (published 1985; ISBN 0-394-54482-X). In McCarthy's novel, Holden is a wanton mass-murderer. There is no historical evidence to suggest that the non-fictional Holden was albinistic. (See main article for further sources.)
- "Albino" (played by Warrick Grier), in Freefall (1994) is a menacing figure who drugs the film's heroine.
- Mark Purayah (Mark II) and Mark Parchezzi (Mark III) ("the Albinos"), in Hitman: Blood Money (released 2005) are clones of an unseen Mark I, and all are assassins. (See main article for further sources.)
- "The Albino" in The Albino's Dancer, a "Time Hunter" novella; the character is a mobster. (See main article for sources.)
- "The Albino" (played by Bill Bolender) from the Star Trek: Deep Space Nine episode "Blood Oath", who is a dishonorable Klingon warrior and murderer. (See main article for further sources.)
- Dr. Robert Kirkland "Kirk" Langström, also known as the Man-Bat, is depicted as being albinistic in the television series The Batman (which also depicts him as more villainous than other versions of the character). Langström's "Man-Bat" form is also depicted as being albino.(See main article for further sources.)
- Kobra, an albinistic biker in Robert R. McCammon's 1981 novel They Thirst who is depicted as sadistic and violent. He eventually becomes a commander of an army of vampires besieging Los Angeles (but was albinistic before becoming a vampire).(See main article for sources.)
- Monsieur Zenith, a pulp fiction villain in the "Sexton Blake" series by Anthony Skene. Zenith is a world-weary gentleman thief who uses opium, commits crimes, and feuds with Blake simply to relieve his ennui.
- The clairvoyant albino Juni Swan in Darren Shan's "The Demonata" series is characterized by her deceptive and sadistic nature as well as her exceptional beauty. However, in Death's Shadow, the seventh book of the series, she appears as a hideously deformed monster.
- "Helter Skelter", a mysterious assassin seen in the opening cutscene of the video game No More Heroes
- Bigboy, the sadistic, ruthless chief of the prison guards in the Stephen Hunter novel Pale Horse Coming.
- Jei Farfarello, a sadistic/masochistic member of a group of assassins named "Schwarz" in the anime Weiß Kreuz. He is portrayed as a one-eyed, heavily scarred and clinically insane killer.
- Olivia Presteign, the daughter of a powerful business man in Alfred Bester's The Stars My Destination, is responsible for numerous homicides along with various other crimes. Her albinism renders her blind to the normal spectrum of light visible to humans, but she is able to see the infrared spectrum.
- The anime/manga Deadman Wonderland features two albinos named Chan and En as bodyguards to the main antagonist of the series, the director of Deadman Wonderland named Hagire Rinichirou. They are twin brother and sister, and are incredibly loyal to Hagire, seeing him as a father figure and killing people who merely insult him. There is also a third albino, one of the main characters, named Shiro, who appears an innocent and complacent young girl, but has a cruel and psychopathic alter ego knows as the Wretched Egg, which is Hagire's lifetime obsession.
- Shadow Prove from Bakugan New Vestroia is most probably albino. He often laughs at other peoples problems and tries to annoy but hates being insulted by Mylene, his companion. He is part of the evil organisation Vexos.
- Practical Frost in The First Law series by Joe Abercrombie is an Albino depicted as a brutal and psychopathic torturer's assistant.

Animals and other non-humanoid characters

- In Ice Age: Dawn of the Dinosaurs, the main antagonist, named Rudy, is a huge albino Baryonyx. Unlike most other dinosaurs in the film, he is depicted as vicious, vindictive and entirely inimical. The filmmakers explicitly stated that his albinism is a reference to Moby Dick and other pale fictional antagonists.
- Lord Shen, an albino peacock, the main enemy in Kung Fu Panda 2, who tried to wipe out the pandas to prevent a prophecy of one defeating him, among them being Po's mother.
- The megalodon in Steve Alten's novel Meg: A Novel of Deep Terror, hunted by the main characters, is depicted as albino.
- The Banes from Suzanne Collins's "The Underland Chronicles" novel series. An albino gnawer (giant, talking rat). Born once every few hundred years, they are always insane, tyrannical, and far larger than even the other gnawers. The only one featured in the series is Pearlpelt. He is, however, an exception, as all the Underland humans are albinos, and they are generally portrayed favorably, with varying personalities.
- The Pure Ferrets King Agarnu, Prince Bladd and Princess Kurda of the Redwall book Triss. They were rulers of an island-fortress known as Riftgard and enslaved many creatures, including the protagonist Trisscar Swordmaid. (However, the albinism of these characters has nothing to do with their status as antagonists. It only affects the plot when, early in the story, a minor character discovers the body of Agarnu’s deceased father and mistakes it for a ghost.)
- Silas Vorez, the main antagonist of the 2022 video game The Quarry is a human werewolf with albinism, referred to as the "white wolf".
- A.K.I., a poison-using, insane killer playable in the video game Street Fighter 6.

=== Subjects of ridicule and "freaks" ===
In the last few decades, there has been an increase in the number albinistic characters who are mocked (sometimes by the actual works in which they appear, an instance of albino bias itself, and sometimes by other characters in a way that highlights albino bias).

- "Powder", the eponymous character in the movie Powder. The name can be seen as mocking or derogatory; however the depiction can be seen as positive in its portrayal of the effects of bias against those with albinism.
- Autumn Lynn Henderson, the sister of the protagonist in "Mercy Among the Children" by David Adams Richards. Already an outcast in their small New Brunswick town because of their father's reputation, she is further alienated during her adolescence due to her albinism. Her brother (and protagonist) Lyle tries to make Autumn's life easier by purchasing a wig and contact lenses for her, but it helps very little in the treatment of her by the other children.
- Casper, a.k.a. "Whitey" or "Q-Tip" (played by Michael Bowman), in Me, Myself & Irene (2000). His alleged real name is as mocking as his nicknames. He is the subject of a good deal of ridicule, which may be accurately representative of the casual discrimination that people with albinism are often made to suffer, and is accurately depicted as having impaired vision, and is a vital friend of the main characters. The genuinely albinistic actor "somewhat regrets" taking the role: "I worried that it was sending the wrong message."
- Cee-Cee, a character in "The Mediator" novel series by Meg Cabot, is ridiculed by her classmates. Generally portrayed fairly accurately as a person with albinism, wearing protective clothing, sunscreen, hats, and sunglasses outdoors, though said to have purplish irises even though that is rare. While described supportively, as intelligent. On the other hand, Cee-Cee's aunt, who also has albinism, reads tarot cards and speaks with the dead.
- Harold Kline, in Ghost Boy, a novel by Iain Lawrence, is an albinistic youth who ran away from home and ended up working in the circus with the other "freaks", as people called them. His portrayal is supportive, but the "freak" label is not, even if accurately depicting biased attitudes.
- The hermaphrodite in Federico Fellini's Fellini Satyricon.

=== Neutrally or ambiguously portrayed characters ===
Neutral or at least morally uncertain depictions of persons with albinism are also somewhat common in literature and film, as anti-heroes, morally confused characters, or simply incidentally.

- Elric of Melniboné, the main character of an eponymous series of fantasy novels and short stories by Michael Moorcock that began in 1961 with "The Dreaming City". Elric is described as handsome and intelligent, but physically weak without the aid of drugs and magic. In the book Stormbringer, Elric's final battle saw him heroically defeating the evil forces of Chaos to become the last person alive before the rebirth of humankind. The author stated in 2004 that he had received no complaints with regards to his treatment of albinism since "after all, Elric is a hero (if somewhat flawed)". However, Elric also frequently murders in cold blood and is classified by some reviewers/critics as an anti-hero, even a protagonist–villain. Elric was based in part on the aforementioned M. Zenith. (See main article for further sources.)
- "Snow", an albinistic psychic who achieves a messianic following, has his story told in Snow, a concept album by progressive rock band Spock's Beard. The portrayal is ambiguous and unrealistic, and the character has a stereotypical moniker.
- "U.V.", played by non-albinistic actor Chad E. Donella, in the film Disturbing Behavior. He is not a villain, but a stoner with a stereotypical nickname that refers to his skin sensitivity, while on the other hand has a clever sense of humor, is "hip", and is well-accepted by his friends. (See main article for additional sources.)
- "The bride" (played by the genuinely albinistic Diane Costa), in Nobody's Fool (1986) Depicted accurately, though possibly mostly for comedic effect, as requiring sunglasses under her veil at her outdoor wedding, and mocked behind her back as having landed a husband out of pity, but shown as engaging in a normal societal role.
- Snowdie McLain, an albinistic woman, is a central character in Eudora Welty's The Golden Apples, a book of connected stories set in Mississippi. Other characters sometimes link Snowdie's albinism to her reserved manner or her perceived helplessness.
- Princess Hinoto, in the X manga and TV series and X-1999 movie. While a heroine in the original comics and movie, she becomes a villain in the follow-up television series. Has red eyes in some episodes, purplish in others. Accurately portrayed as having vision problems, but also given deaf-muteness, lameness, and psychic powers.
- "Whitey" (played by Robert Englund), in Buster and Billie. He dyes his hair black, but is known by his nickname, which he wears on his hat.
- The detective, in What's the Worst that Could Happen?. Like the villain in Foul Play, he wears all-white suits.
- Olympia Binewski, an albinistic, bald, hunchbacked dwarf, from the 1989 novel Geek Love by Katherine Dunn. "Oly" is the narrator of the story, and as part of a family intentionally bred for defects for traveling carnival show purposes is no more or less "freakish" than the rest of the major characters; her albinism appears simply to have been selected at random by the author as a genetic abnormality to add to the list. (See main article for sources and further detail.)
- Cielle, a minor character in the flash animation film Broken Saints, is an albinistic occultist with white dreadlocks and pink eyes who gives a prophetic tarot card reading to characters Raimi and Oran. Although Oran scorns her, she is not offended and claims that many people don't understand her condition.
- The personification of Prussia in the anime/webcomic Hetalia: Axis Powers is commonly perceived by fans of the series to be an albino, because of his red eyes and silver-white hair. Whether or not he actually albinistic has not been discussed in the series canon, however.
- Mr. Skimpole, a character in The Somnambulist at first seems evil, but is made more likable through his crippled son, whom he cares for (although the narrator insinuates that his son might be a fabrication, to make Skimpole seem more sympathetic).
- Kevin Smith, the silent, knife-wielding British assassin in Goichi Suda's Killer7 video game, one of the seven Smith personalities the player may control. Although a protagonist, the character's occupation as a murderer is not particularly heroic. (See main article for sources).
- Theokoles, "the Shadow of Death", is an albinistic, pink-eyed gladiator in the fifth episode, "Shadow Games" (2010), of the Starz TV series Spartacus: Blood and Sand. He is depicted as a huge and greatly feared, savage warrior prone to blood-lust, "a beast that has never been tamed". Despite the fact that at least one review labels the character an "evil albino", Theokoles is also said to have won many fortunes and his freedom via his long-undefeated string of victories in the arena, for which he is respected as well as feared by other gladiators.
- The Underland humans from Suzanne Collins's "The Underland Chronicles" novel series are all albinistic, with violet eyes, since they live underground and are not exposed to the sun. They are portrayed as no different from any other race, with varying personalities. (See also The Banes, above.)
- Hansberry in the film A Guy Thing (2003)
- The anime/manga series Deadman Wonderland features an albino character named Shiro (Japanese for "white"). She is introduced as an absurdly strong but ditzy and kind girl who knew the main character Ganta as a child and was in love with him. It is later revealed that Shiro is a split personality. Her secondary persona is called the Wretched Egg, a violent, psychopathic murderer. The Wretched Egg persona becomes one of the main antagonists while the Shiro persona struggles in vain to retake control. This puts her in the odd position of being both the villain and a victim.
- Brynden Rivers, also known as Bloodraven for a birthmark on his neck, is an albino character in George R. R. Martin's A Song of Ice and Fire who, while a bastard of the Targaryen bloodline, decided to not side with his rebelling siblings against the throne long before the series begins. He loses an eye during said rebellion, and serves the realm afterwards. Later he is revealed to still be living, although it is unclear if he is a villain or not thus far.
- One of the sangomas, or witchdoctors, in Shaka Zulu has albinism.
- In Games Workshop's tabletop game "The Horus Heresy" the Emperor's Children Space Marine legion is described as having a gene-seed defect that results in an "occasional incidence of albinism, and a shift in iris colour to violet in some recruits." The Emperor's Children are initially depicted as being obsessed with achieving personal perfection in all ways, though they seemed not to care about this defect. They were the only legion allowed to bear the Emperor's name, and the only legion allowed to bear his personal standard, the "Palatine Aquila." However, they were also one of the legions which betrayed the Imperium during the Horus heresy event. Whether or not this makes them evil is entire subjective, as arguments can be made for both the Imperium and the Traitor Legions being good or evil. It is unknown whether this gene-seed defect still exists in Warhammer 40,000 (of which the Horus Heresy is a spin-off game.)
- In Kazuma Kamachi's A Certain Magical Index, Accelerator, is an esper with albinism due to his ability. At first he is portrayed as a villain in the story, but as the story progresses he is portrayed more of an anti-hero.

Animals and other non-humanoid characters

- Moby Dick, an albino sperm whale, in the book Moby-Dick.

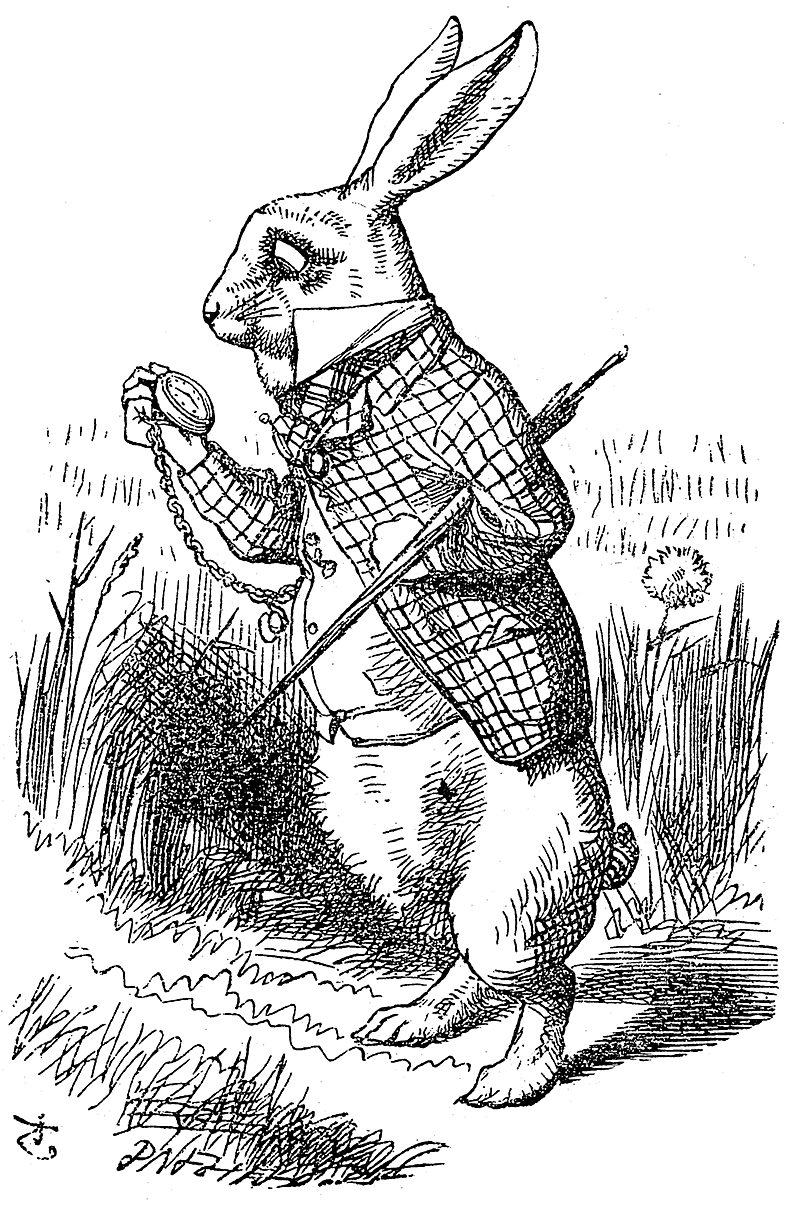
Lewis Carroll's White Rabbit is arguably one of the most famous albino characters in literature.

- The White Rabbit from Lewis Carroll's Alice's Adventures in Wonderland. (Although Carroll did not specifically state that the character is albinistic, and not all white rabbits are albinos in real life, both the 1951 adaptation and the 2010 Tim Burton re-imagining, among other more obscure versions, depict him as an albino, with pink eyes.) While the White Rabbit is timid and nervous, he is depicted as one of the saner and more intelligent denizens of Wonderland.
- In C.S. Lewis's novel Out of the Silent Planet, the protagonist Ransom (an Englishman visiting Mars) encounters three species of intelligent Martians. One Martian individual is unpigmented.
- El Blanco, in Tremors 3: Back to Perfection, is an albino graboid that while inaccurately portrayed as being sterile as a result of albinism.
- In the Perils of Penelope Pitstop episode "Arabian Desert Danger", Penelope tries to cross a desert to donate a young albino camel to a zoo without having to put the animal in danger.
- Philip of Macedonia, Uncle Amos's pet crocodile from The Kane Chronicles.
- In Flushed Away, an albino rat named Whitey is one of the villain's henchmen; although he works for the villain, he comes across as friendly and good-natured with no malicious intent (making him an ambiguous example rather than a clearly negative one).

=== Positively portrayed characters ===
Persons with albinism are sometimes depicted heroically or otherwise positively, or at least accurately with regard to their condition and its medical and social results:

- Alexander Kramir from the novel Lentara is a fairly accurately portrayed boy with albinism who helps an alien race save the Earth and falls in love with an alien. He later fathers a child who will help save the universe.
- Bibwit Harte, Queen Alyss's albino tutor from Frank Beddor's The Looking Glass Wars. A human version of the White Rabbit (see above) from Alice's Adventures in Wonderland, he has large, unusually sensitive ears, and his name is an anagram of "white rabbit."
- Dancy Flammarion, the monster-slaying heroine of Caitlín R. Kiernan's Alabaster comics, as well as many prose stories by the author, including her novel Threshold and the short stories collected in Alabaster.
- Beowulf "Bey" Shaeffer, hero of several stories in Larry Niven's Known Space series, from the planet We Made It, which is populated primarily by albinistic people due to a founder effect from the original colonists. (See main article for sources.)
- Bran Davies, in "The Dark Is Rising" novel series, is a positive portrayal but somewhat inaccurate because the character lacks any vision problems.
- Bjørn Beltø, an archaeologist in Tom Egeland's Norwegian novel Sirkelens Ende (Circle's End), ISBN 82-03-18974-1, which pre-dates but is very similar to The Da Vinci Code, which incidentally features an albinistic person in a negative role while Egeland's novel does the opposite.
- Pete White in The Venture Bros. animated series on Adult Swim. An albinistic computer scientist and friend of Dr. Venture from his college years, he runs "Conjectural Technologies" with Master Billy Quizboy, Boy Genius. The name is stereotypical (as per superhero convention), but his intelligence is accentuated, and the character is not otherwise mocked, although Dr. Venture makes a reference in the pilot to an experiment gone awry with a device called an "albino bomb." This line does not seem to be canon though. In an earlier career as a TV quiz host, he wore a black wig and used makeup in an attempt to appear "normal", although this fear came less from discrimination than from his own desire to be popular.
- Misaki Saiki, an albinistic dominatrix, is the principle heroine in the Vulgar Ghost Daydream manga. She speaks to ghosts for a special government agency, but such fantasy is common in the genre. (See main article for sources.)
- Billy Raven of the "Children of the Red King" novel series, an albinistic orphan initially manipulated into helping a villain, is overall a sympathetic character. Realistically, he needs eyeglasses; unrealistically, he has the magic ability to talk to animals, although his supernatural abilities are said to not be related to his albinism (cf. "Snow" and "Powder", etc., above).
- Geralt of Rivia from Andrzej Sapowski's The Witcher series.
- Setsuna Sakurazaki of the manga Negima! is stated to be an albino who regularly dyes her hair and wears contact lenses to hide her albinism. (See main article for sources.)
- Peter Smart in Adam Salter's 2007 novel The Platinum Prison (ISBN 978-1847534415) is an albinistic man, tortured by the label "albino", who "tries...to find his place in life and search[es] for acceptance and love" in the late 1960s and early 1970s.
- Persephone "Percy" Parker, "an albino orphan with a talent for languages", in Leanna Renee Hieber's Gothic occult novels set in Victorian London, is a sympathetic character described as a beautiful and intelligent young woman, with a normal love life and the respect of colleagues.
- The Albino Pirate from Gideon Defoe's The Pirates! series is a fan favorite character, noted for his kindness, youthful inexperience, and naivete. While his condition is occasionally exploited or misunderstood, he is always portrayed fairly, and his albinism is not the central focus of his character. (While his name, or lack thereof, seems to indicate otherwise, all the pirates are named for one noticeable feature, e.g. The Pirate With Gout or The Pirate with a Scarf.)
- Strangelove, an albino bisexual artificial intelligence developer from the Metal Gear series.
- The playable avatar from Fire Emblem Fates (named Corrin by default) has traits of albinism, though this is only by default since this character can be customized.
- Sunny, the heroine of fantasy novel Akata Witch by Nnedi Okorafor, is an American-born Nigerian girl with albinism who discovers her magical abilities and enters the world of the Leopard People.
- In the 2012 Canadian movie War Witch (rebelle) by Kim Nguyen, telling the story of a runaway child soldier in West Africa and an albino boy played by Serge Kanyinda, albinos play an important role. The movie portrays an albino community.

Animals and other non-humanoid characters

- Dangerous Beans, an anthropomorphic albino rat in Terry Pratchett's children's novel, The Amazing Maurice and His Educated Rodents, is the most intelligent and peaceful of the group, and a kind of spiritual leader. He is almost totally blind.
- Urthwyte the Mighty, an anthropomorphic albino badger in the "Redwall"-series fantasy novel Salamandastron by Brian Jacques. He is portrayed as a kind, gentle and talented leader.
- Chobbal, an albino camel, is the hero of Sophie and the Albino Camel and other books by British children's author Stephen Davies. He experiences rejection by his own mother, and is fed and nurtured by a young African boy. He has a cheerful and generous disposition.
- Ghost, in George R. R. Martin's A Song of Ice and Fire, is an albino dire wolf trained to aid his companion Jon Snow. He is the second most frequently referred-to companion animal in the story.
- The Magic: The Gathering character Ajani Goldmane is an albino leonid (a race of fictional anthropomorphic lions). Once saw as a bad omen from his own tribe for his condition, after the brother's death he became a "Planeswalker", a powerful being capable to travel to the other planes of the game's multiverse (a trait secluded to most of the other living beings).

=== Other references to albinism ===
==== Comics ====
- Albino is the alias of two Marvel Comics supervillains, Augusta Seger and Ulysses Counts. In Augusta Seger's backstory, he acquired the nickname "Albino" in school because of his pale skin, he grew up to become a criminal, and was recruited into the Power Men supervillain team and given a serum which allowed him to mimic others' superpowers. After Augusta was arrested, he accidentally transferred his powers to Ulysses Counts, his friend and old partner in crime, who gained the ability to phase through solid objects, used that power to escape from jail, and assumed the alias of Albino.
- Allison Double, a telepathic woman with albinism is an ally of Captain Britain. She helps Betsy Braddock adjust to life without her sight after she is brutally beaten and blinded by Slaymaster.
- Deluge (Mzungu) is an African mutant with albinism. He fought (and was killed) by the X-Men.
- In the IDW version of Teenage Mutant Ninja Turtles, the character Lita is a human-born mutant turtle with albinism.

==== Film ====
- James, a character in Shortbus, had a catchphrase, "I'm an albino!" that he used as a child star in a fictitious sitcom about a white child growing up in a black family. In the film, he has grown up, and people use "I'm an albino!" as a greeting to him at parties. He and his partner also gleefully shout the phrase while having sex. At one party, a man with albinism comes up to James and talks to him, saying "I really am an albino" (although played by Reg Vermue, who has normal pigment in real life).

==== Music ====
- "An albino" (along with "a mulatto") is mentioned in the chorus of "Smells Like Teen Spirit".

==== Television ====
- Sons of Anarchy season 2, episode 1, titled "Albification", concerns "whitewashing" various unpleasant truths, and introduces L.O.A.N., a new (fictional) white supremacist organization, which strives to prevent the titular motorcycle club of the show from doing business with people of color.

== Myths, folklore, and urban legends ==
=== Africa ===
In Zimbabwe, modern folklore posits that sexual intercourse with an albinistic person will cure one of HIV, leading to the rape and subsequent HIV infection of women with albinism in that region.

In Tanzania in 2008, President Jakaya Kikwete publicly condemned witch doctors for opportunistic persecution of albinism, including a spate of murders of albinistic people. Over 50 albinos were murdered between March 2007 and October 2008. They were motivated to kill albinos for their body parts which are thought to bring good luck – hair, arms, legs and blood are used to make potions which the witch doctors claim will bring prosperity. Consequently, graves of the albinistic have to be sealed with cement to discourage grave robbers. By June 2008, killings had been reported in neighboring Kenya and possibly also the Democratic Republic of the Congo, spreading to Burundi by October 2008.

=== Caribbean ===
In Jamaica, people with albinism were historically degraded, and regarded as "cursed". The albinistic musicians King Yellowman and Al Beeno helped to curb this stereotype.

=== North America ===
The 2004 book Weird N.J. (a tie-in to the History Channel TV series Weird U.S.) chronicled and further popularized one of the lesser-known local urban legends of the US, "albino colonies". The book uses alleged first-hand accounts mailed to the authors to paint a picture of various locations in the U.S. (most notably Clifton, New Jersey) where aggregations of albinistic families were said to live in seclusion. The accounts tell tales of honking horns to try to bring the residents out of their houses, of gawkers being shot at by residents, and even of gangs of local albinistic vigilantes.

In some versions of the sewer alligator urban legends, the alligators supposedly became albinistic due to mutation and/or lack of exposure to sunlight which erroneously conflates pallor due to lack of exposure to sunlight with albinism.

=== Central America ===
Among the Guna of Panama and Colombia, members with albinism have a special place in their indigenous mythology. While they are regarded as physically inferior, at the same time they are regarded as 'closer to God' and in possession of special powers. At times of eclipses, the Guna believe their members with albinism are able to scare away with bow and arrow the demon who devours the sun or moon.

== Film and television coverage of discrimination against albinism ==
Due to a wave of persecution of people with albinism in some parts of Africa (especially Tanzania and neighboring countries) a number of documentary films have been made about the problem. They have depicted persecution including ritual murder and dismemberment for potions and good-luck charms. These include:

- In My Genes (Kenya, 2009)
- White and Black: Crimes of Color (Canada/Tanzania, 2010)
- In the Shadow of the Sun (Tanzania, 2013)
- Black Man White Skin (2015)

Also released in 2013, White Shadow, an award-winning German–Italian–Tanzanian drama film, portrays the plight of albinistic Tanzanians and their efforts to avoid falling victim to witchdoctors' bounty hunters.

Outside the African context, the 2007 short film "Perception Is Not Reality: Portraying the REAL Truths About Albinism", was produced by Mashawna Thompson, editor of the Parent of a Child with Albinism blog. It attempted to dispel Hollywood and urban-legend misconceptions about the condition. A new version, featuring over 40 different children with albinism, was released in 2014. The theme of The Albino Code (2007) is to point out the absurdity of typical depictions of albinistic people in Western media. In 2009, two African American albinistic fashion models, Shaun Ross and Diandra Forrest, were the focus of an episode of the Tyra Banks Show, and revealed the traumas they experienced growing up albinistic, before finding unexpected success in front of the camera. My Colour, Your Kind, a 1998 Australian film, gives a powerful, impressionistic insight into the feelings of alienation experienced by a teenage albino Aboriginal girl. In a convent boarding school in Alice Springs, she is misunderstood and bullied by a severe, unloving nun. She escapes in dreams and eventually in reality to her mother where she feels at peace.

== Notable people with albinism ==
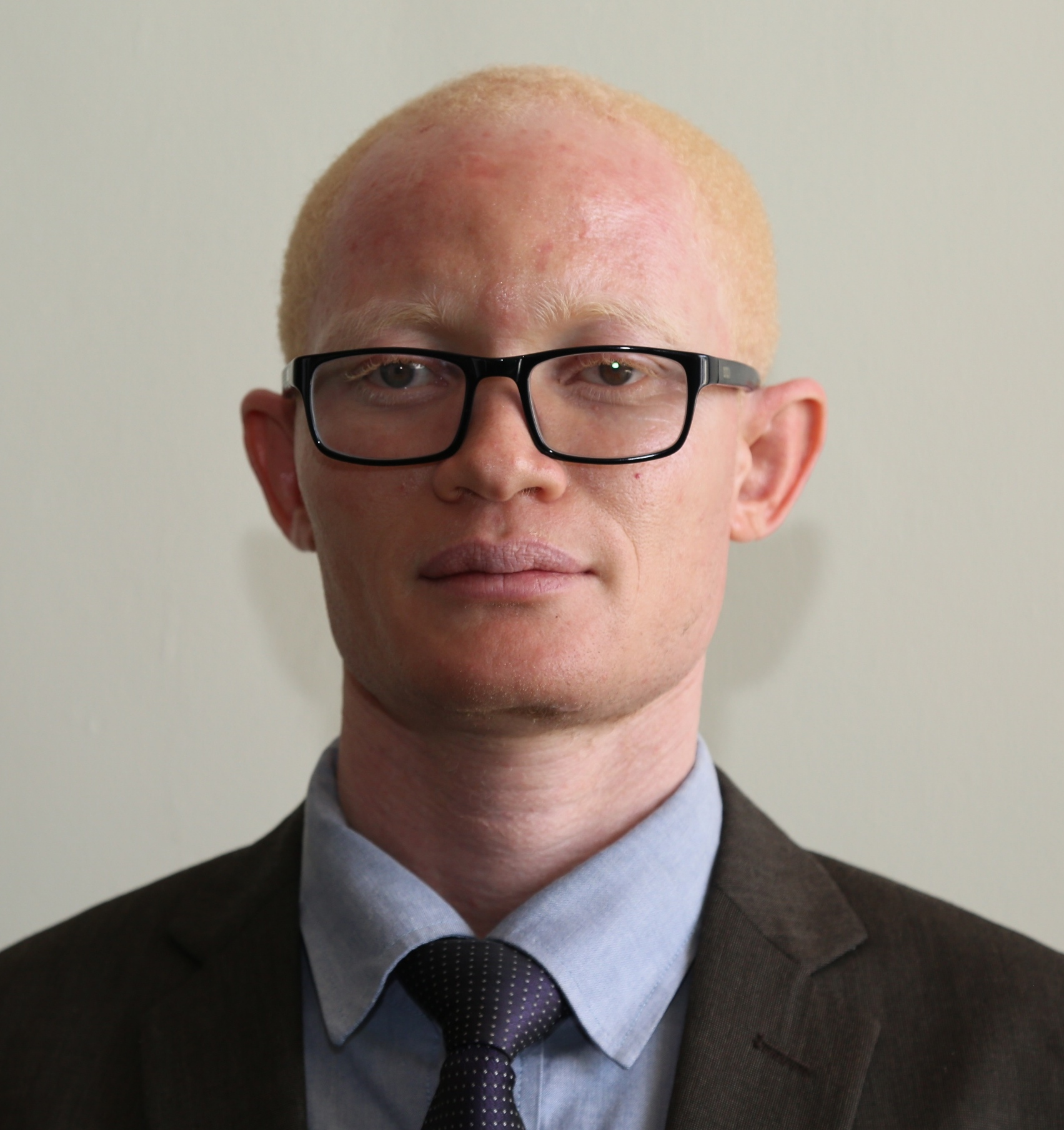
Abdallah Possi, Deputy State Minister in Tanzania

- Salum Khalfani Bar'wani, a politician in Tanzania (a country marked by persecution of people with albinism) elected to the National Assembly in October 2010.
- Connie Chiu, a Hong Kong female fashion model with Jean-Paul Gaultier
- Cano Estremera, a Puerto Rican salsa musician
- Winston "Yellowman" Foster (also known as "King Yellowman"), a Jamaican dancehall musician
- G. Harishankar, a Carnatic khanjira drummer
- Thando Hopa, a South African model, activist, and lawyer
- Bera Ivanishvili, a Georgian singer
- Marvin "Krondon" Jones III, an American rapper and actor
- Zephania Kameeta, a Namibian religious and political leader
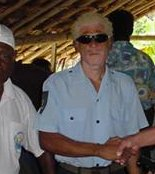
- Stanley "Sataan" Kaoni, 2002
  Stanley Kaoni (also known as "Sataan"), a former Solomon Islands militant leader. Kaoni has light blonde hair and pale facial skin with some evidence of vitiligo, and appears to have developed some pigmentation especially on the arms; his particular type of albinism is likely to be OCA1b.
- Salif Keita, a Malian popular musician
- Malford Milligan, an American blues and soul singer
- Refilwe "Vanillablaq" Modiselle, South African female fashion model, singer, and actress, nominated to the Oprah Magazine 2013 "Power List"
- Corrie "Al Beeno" Moodie (also known as "Prince Yellowman"), a Jamaican dancehall musician now living in Canada
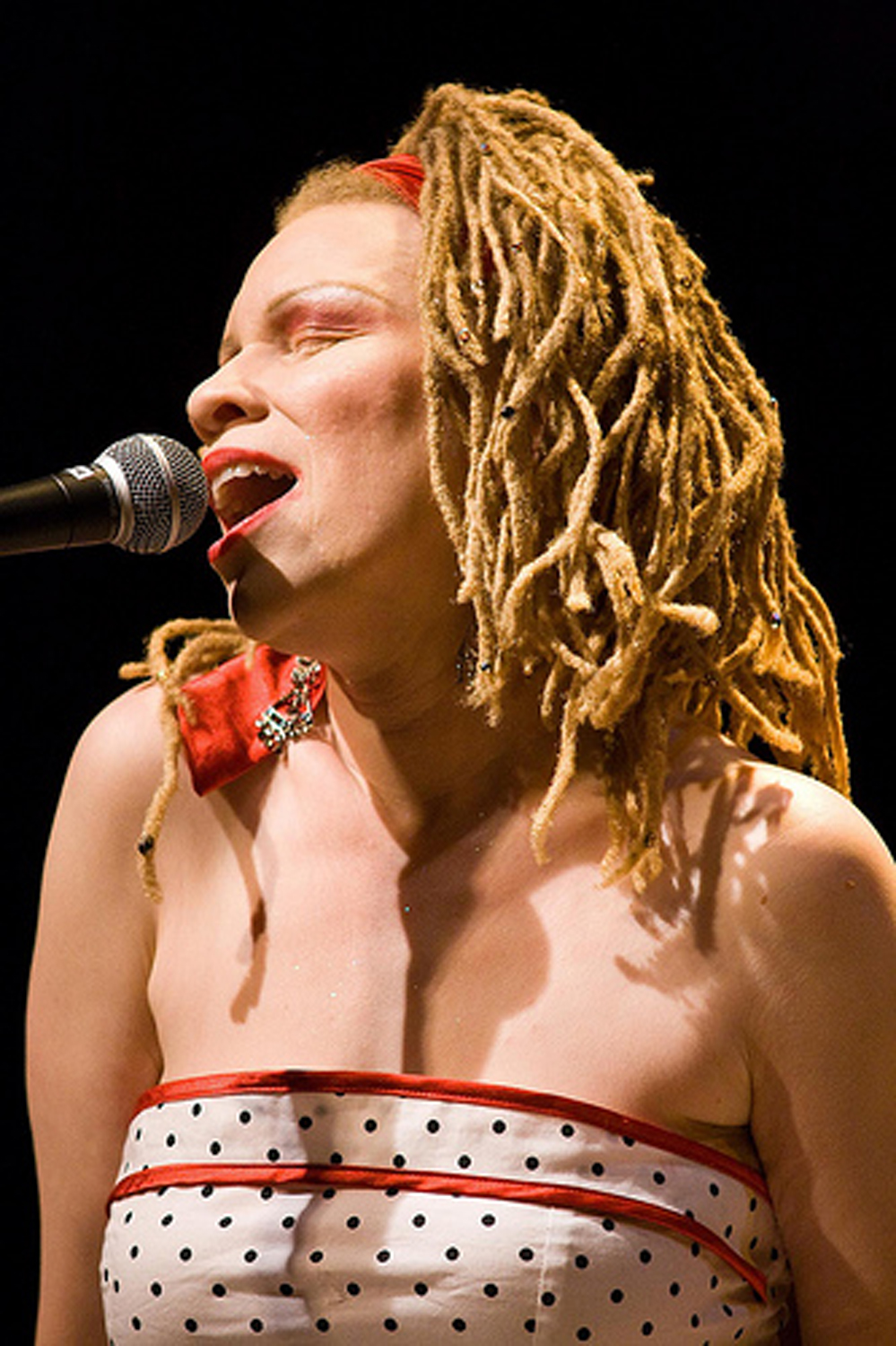
- Mem Nahadr
  Mem "M" Nahadr, an African-American performance artist, author, composer, off-broadway producer, and multi-octave, multi-genred vocalist.
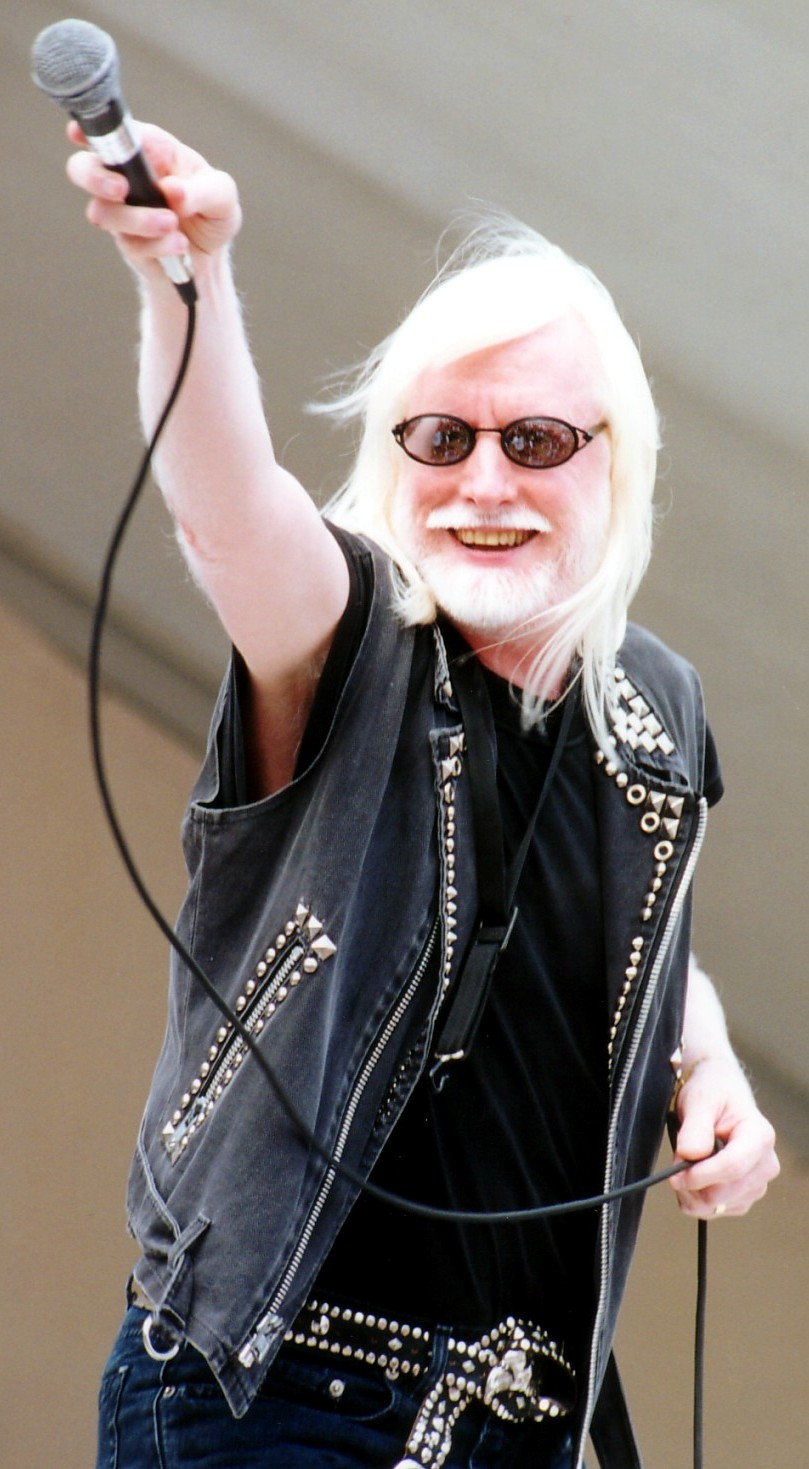
  Edgar Winter
- Ali "Brother Ali" Newman, an American hip hop artist
- Hermeto Pascoal, a Brazilian jazz musician
- Willie "Piano Red" Perryman, an American blues musician
- Abdallah Possi, a deputy government minister in Tanzania.
- Shaun Ross, an African-American male fashion model with Djamee Models
- Sivuca, another Brazilian jazz musician
- Seinei, 22nd Emperor of Japan (5th century)
- Ayanda Candice Sibanda, Zimbabwean model and activist
- William Archibald Spooner, an Anglican priest and Oxford don
- Darnell Swallow, a contestant on Big Brother 9 UK (2008); noted for discussing albinism and his desire for acceptance with his on-show housemates, e.g. wearing a top with the words "Don't Label Me. Respect Me"
- Victor Varnado, African American stand-up comedian and actor.
- Redford White (Cipriano Cermeño II), a Filipino actor and comedian
- Edgar Winter and Johnny Winter, American blues-rock musician brothers
- David Wrench, a Welsh-born electronic musician
- Zāl (Persian: زال), a warrior of ancient Persia (present-day Iran), mentioned in the Shahnameh. Today, in Persian zaal is a term for albinistic people.

=== People commonly mistaken to have albinism ===
Roy Orbison was falsely said to be albino, by his widow, for unknown reasons. German singer Heino has Graves' disease, which can be mistaken for albinism. Actor Anthony Rapp fronts a rock band called Albinokid, but is not albinistic, being a normally pigmented, blonde Caucasian. Prime Minister of the UK, Boris Johnson, known for his pale hair, has also been mistakenly called albino. In general, platinum blonde ("towheaded") people with very pale skin can be mistaken for albinistic (and conversely, some forms of albinism can result in phenotypes so normal-looking that only genetic testing can reveal the albinistic genes).

== Notable albino animals ==
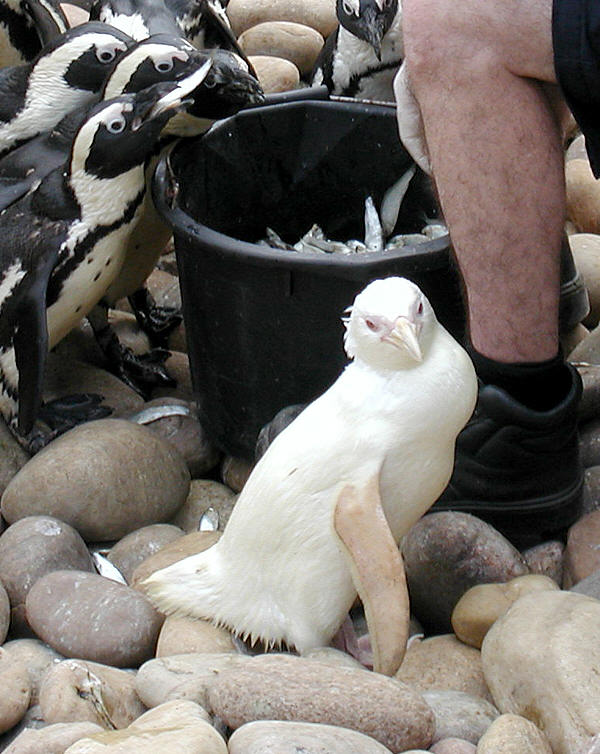
Snowdrop, an albino African penguin, born at Bristol Zoo (England). Snowdrop would otherwise have looked like the background penguins.

Many notable albino animals have become special attractions at zoos or theme parks. Bristol Zoo was the home to a very rare albino African penguin named Snowdrop, who was hatched at the zoo in October 2002 and died in August 2004. For many years, a unique albino gorilla named Floquet de Neu in Catalan and Copito de Nieve in Spanish (both meaning "Snowflake"), was the most famous resident of the Parc Zoològic de Barcelona. There is also an albino crocodile in Jungle Island theme park in Miami, Fl.

Other notable albino animals have been found in the wild. An albino humpback whale called Migaloo (Australian Aboriginal for "White Lad") travels the east coast of Australia, and has become famous in the local media. In 2009, a pink albino bottlenose dolphin, nicknamed Pinky, was sighted several times in an inland lake in the United States, and footage of it has become popular on Internet video sites. Perhaps the most significant albino animal in history was Mocha Dick, a sperm whale of the early 19th century that lived mostly near the island of Mocha, off Chile's southern Pacific coast, several decades before Herman Melville fictionalized him in the 1851 novel Moby-Dick. The real whale was renowned for being docile until attacked whereupon he became ferocious and capable of disabling smaller vessels. This made him widely feared among whaler crews, though also a target for adventurous captains, who engaged him in possibly as many as hundred or more sea battles before he was eventually killed.
