= Candice Modiselle =

South African actress and television presenter (born 1994)

- Modiselle in early 2020
- Born: Tumelo Candice Modiselle; 17 May 1994 (age 32); Johannesburg, Gauteng, South Africa
- Education: University of Witwatersrand
- Occupations: Actress; tv presenter; radio presenter; entrepreneur
- Years active: 2018–present
- Notable work: Generations
- Spouse: Sechaba Sello (m. 2025)
- Relatives: Bontle Modiselle (sister); Refilwe Modiselle (sister)

Tumelo Candice Modiselle Sello (born 17 May 1994) is a South African actress, television presenter, radio presenter and entrepreneur. She is best known for her portrayal of Lerato Matema on SABC 1 sopie opera Generations. She was previously known as a presenter on the kids show YOTV Live. She is the executive producer and host of The Five Minute Call Show on YouTube, and the co-founder and chief executive of Sellé Jewellery.

== Early life ==
Modiselle was born in 1994, in Johannesburg, Gauteng, South Africa to a Christian family. She is the third born in an all-girls family. During an interview with Bona Magazine in 2019, she described her upbringing as on the best she wouldn't trade for anything in the world. Modiselle has two older sisters who are also in the entertainment industry, namely Bontle and Refilwe Modiselle. She graduated from the University of Witwatersrand where she obtained a bachelor's degree and Honours degree in Dramatic Arts.

== Career ==
Her acting career kicked off when she landing a small role in Mzansi Magic limited television series Impilo:The Scam after landing her TV presenting gig on SABC 1 Youth Program YOTV which launched her into stardom. She later had a recurring role on Generations: The Legacy as Lerato Matema. She also played the role of Mbali in The Queen.

In 2021 Modiselle made her Netflix debut on the dance-drama series JIVA! alongside Ayanda Daweti and her real life sister Bontle Modiselle. She hosted a reality show in 2023 Bridesmaids and made her appearance in Disney short movie Kizazi Moto: Generation Fire as Alani. She also starred in a Netflix short film Love, Sex and 30 Candles as Linda. In 2024, she played two roles of Young Niala and Niala in Panda Bear in Africa.

Through her career milestones as a presenter include hosting the first Forbes 30 under 30. She went on to host the 2022 South African Craft, the 2022 Feather Awards and the South African Film and Television Awards. She is the executive producer and host in a YouTube show namely The Five Minute Call Show.

== Personal life ==
Modiselle is officially married to Sechaba Sello. The couple tied the knot in a private traditional wedding surrounded by family and close friends.

== Filmography ==
=== Films ===
Year	Film	Role
2018	Impilo:The Scam	Naledi
2019	Generations	Lerato
2021	Jiva!	Vuyiswa
2023	The Queen	Mbali
2023	Kizazi Moto: Generation Fire	Alani
2023	Love, Sex and 30 Candles	Linda
2024	Panda Bear in Africa	Young Niala; Nial

=== Television ===
Year	Television	Role
2019	Come Dine With Me South Africa	Herself
2024	Bridesmaids	Herself

== Awards and nominations ==
Year	Association	Category	Nominated works	Result	Ref.
2022	Feather Awards	Fag Hag of the Year	Herself	Won	
2023	National TV and Film Awards SA	Best Actress	As Linda on Love, Sex and 30 Candles	Won	
2024	Basadi in Music Awards	Music TV Show Presenter of the Year	Beatz and Rhymes season 1	Nominated	
