= Flatabø =

Flatabø is a Norwegian surname. Notable people with the surname include:

- Isak Larsson Flatabø (1896–1969), Norwegian politician
- Jon Flatabø (1846–1930), Norwegian writer
