= Albino bias =

Albino bias may refer to:

- Negative, unrealistic and stereotyping depictions of albinism in popular culture
- Actual persecution of people with albinism
