= Yellowman (disambiguation) =

Yellowman (born 1956) is a Jamaican reggae and dancehall deejay and vocalist.

Yellowman may also refer to:

- YellowMan, a tattoo clothing brand by Peter Mui
- Yellowman (candy) a chewy toffee produced in Northern Ireland
- Yellowman (play), a 2002 play by Dael Orlandersmith
- Al Beeno or Prince Yellowman, Jamaican reggae dancehall deejay

== See also ==
- Yellow people
