= Tina Trovik =

Norwegian writer

Tina Trovik (born 1973) is a Norwegian children's and young adult fiction writer.

She hails from Andenes. Trying to start a literary career while working as a graphic designer and illustrator, she had her drafts refused multiple times, until she finally won a stipend from Schibsted. She then made her literary debut with the fantasy novel Samuel Sekel og flukten fra Paris, issued on Schibsted in 2012. Dagbladet called the book "entertaining", hinging on "The combination of a solid plot and wild fantasy, with a side of historical knowledge". The book earned her the Ark children's literature prize of 2012; though presented by the Ark book store chain, the winner is decided through a vote from roughly 10,000 children in Norway.

The book was the first in a series about the Samuel Sekel character, which continued with Samuel Sekel. Fanget i Pompeii (2013) and Samuel Sekel og spådommen fra Delfi (2014). In 2016 she released the young adult fiction novel Hvileløs. Mellom levende og døde on Cappelen Damm. The reviewer in Vårt Land found the book "suspending", but somewhat unfitting for the age group 14 to 18.

Awards
Preceded by Mari Moen Holsve	Recipient of the Ark children's literature prize 2012	Succeeded by Tom Egeland
