= Sibanda =

Sibanda is a Southern African surname, most common in Zimbabwe but also seen in Botswana and South African families. In Zimbabwe its common from the Ndebele as well as Sotho families. For some families it derived from Sebata under the BaTau/Sotho-Tswana clans. The word 'Sibanda' was a Nguni corruption of the Sepedi word 'Sebata'. The BaTau people recognised the lion as their totem or spirit animal

Notable people with the surname include:

- Ayanda Candice Sibanda, Zimbabwean model and activist
- Karabo Sibanda, Botswana sprinter
- Jabulani Sibanda former chairman of the Rhodesian War Veterans Association
- Gibson Sibanda, founding vice president of the Movement for Democratic Change
- Felix Magalela Mafa Sibanda, politician and MP of MDC
- Mehluli Don Ayanda Sibanda, Zimbabwean tennis player
- Mercedes Sibanda, Zimbabwean footballer
- Olivia Sibanda, Zimbabwean novelist
- Vusi Sibanda, Zimbabwean cricketer
- Prof Omphemetse S. Sibanda, a South African Law Professor with Zimbabwean ancestral origin.
