= Bontle Modiselle =

South African actress and TV personality

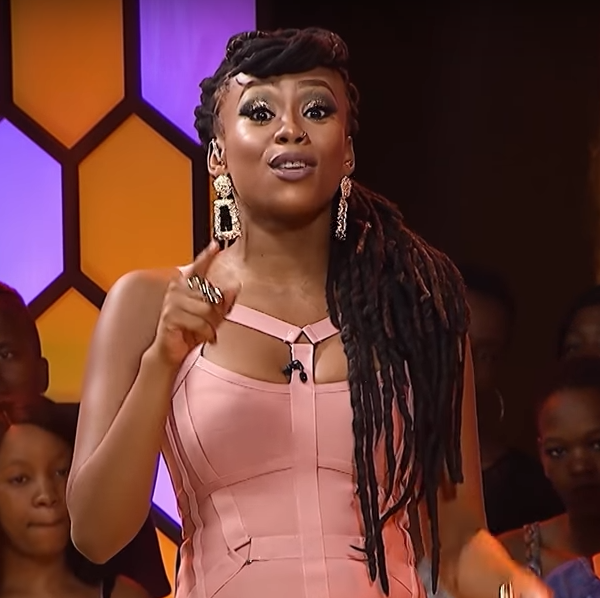
- Bontle Modiselle in 2019 presenting the MTV Shuga Down South preview
- Born: Bontle Modiselle; 7 October 1990 (age 35); Soweto, Johannesburg
- Education: University of Johannesburg
- Occupations: Actress; Television presenter; Radio personality; Dancer; Choreographer; Singer; Model
- Years active: 2008 - present
- Spouse: Priddy Ugly (m. 2019)
- Relatives: Refilwe Modiselle (older sister); Candice Modiselle(younger sister)

Bontle Modiselle-Moloi (born 7 October 1990) is a South African actress, television presenter, radio personality, dancer, choreographer, singer and model. In 2015, she starred in the dance film Hear Me Move, which resulted in her receiving an Africa Movie Academy Award nomination for Best Actress in a Supporting Role.

== Life and career ==
=== Early life ===
Bontle Jade-Lee Modiselle was born to Percy and Grace Modiselle, on 7 October 1990, in Soweto, Johannesburg, and was mainly raised in the north-eastern region of Johannesburg. She is of Bantu-speaking ethnic group Tswana. Modiselle has two sisters: model Refilwe Modiselle and television personality Candice Modiselle, both of whom are also in the entertainment industry. Modiselle's father who was a model, died by committing suicide. Modiselle blamed herself for his death as she dreamt of the action before it occurred. She told both her parents after experiencing the nightmare, but it turned out to be true which heavily affected her. Modiselle attended the University of Johannesburg where she obtained a Bachelor of Arts Degree in Corporate Communications.

=== Dance, film and television ===
In 2007, Modiselle began her dancing career by attending dancing activities, including dance classes led by choreographers. She made her debut appearance in the entertainment industry as a music video model and an occasional dancer. Modiselle appeared on numerous videos from notable artists including DJ Tira, Rouge and Major League DJz. The dancing scene introduced her to the acting industry, as she made her film debut on the dance-drama film Hear Me Move (2014), playing "Khanyi". Modiselle then starred on the inaugural season at SABC 3 drama series Thula's Vine, where she played " Lindi". She also starred on Mzansi Magic Lokshin Bioskop shot-film Lokshin FM, playing "Meme".

On 6 February 2016, Modiselle made her debut television appearance as the host of SABC 2 reality competition series franchise Showville, as a co-host alongside actor Rob van Vuuren. In the following month, she presented an award at the 2016 South African Film and Television Awards along with her sisters. In June 2017, Modiselle was announced as the new presenter of e.tv music show Club 808, joining Lawrence Maleka in replacing Boity Thulo. The show made its final episode on 30 March 2018. Modiselle continued her hosting duties on the SABC 1 rap-battle competition series One Mic second season which premiered on 7 February 2019.

Prior to venturing into dancing, Modiselle took part as a choreographer for several events and shows. She was the main choreographer for the African franchise of the MTV musical competition series Lip Sync Battle which began in 2016. She was also one of the choreographers at the MTV Africa Music Awards 2016. On 17–18 June 2019, Modiselle was the head choreographer for the Castle Lite Unlocks edition event headlined by Meek Mill. As a dancer, she was featured in various events including sport events Basketball National League (under a group called Set If Off) and The MultiChoice Diski Challenge.

On 31 July, Modiselle co-hosted the 27th ceremony of the South African Music Awards alongside Lawrence Maleka. In November 5, she landed the role of hosting Telkom Monate Vibes musical show which airs on SABC 1.

=== Endorsements ===
In March 2018, it was announced that Modiselle was chosen as the new face of Revlon South Africa, alongside actress Michelle Mosalakae and television presenters: Luthando Shosha and Kim Jayde Robinson. In their promotional commercial, she was featured as a dancing personality promoting the term "Dance Proof" concerning their ColourStay makeup. Modiselle has also had an association with the company Always. In May 2023 she led dancing and a talk at Thutolore Secondary School in Meadowlands, Soweto where she encouraged girls to stay in school despite period poverty. 100 girls received six months supply of sanitary pads.

== Personal life ==
Modiselle is married to rapper Ricardo Moloi professionally known as Priddy Ugly, whom she met in 2009. On 19 August 2019, they made an announcement that they're expecting their first child through social media posts showing Modiselle's baby bump. They then got married on 28 September 2019, in a traditional African wedding.

Bontle and her husband Priddy Ugly have a daughter, they named Afrika Bonita Lerato Moloi.
