= Refilwe Modiselle =

South African model and entertainer

- Born: 2 January 1985 (age 41); Rockville, Soweto, Gauteng, South Africa
- Other name: "Vanillablaq"
- Occupations: Model; singer; actress
- Years active: 2005 - present
- Modelling information
- Hair colour: Blond
- Eye colour: Grey/Green

Refilwe Modiselle (born 2 January 1985) is a South African model and entertainer born in Rockville, Soweto, and the country's first professional fashion model with albinism. She started her modelling career at the age of 13 when she was approached by Y! magazine. She also appeared as a runway model in 2005 for South African designer David Tlale, making her the first albinistic model to appear on a runway in South Africa. Modiselle has also had some experience in the music industry, where she performed as a backing vocalist for South African singer Keabetswe "KB" Motsilanyane while in school. She was nominated to the Oprah Magazine 2013 "Power List", and began an acting career. She uses the nickname "Vanillablaq" in social media.

== Early life and education ==
Modiselle was born in Rockville, Soweto (in Gauteng, South Africa) where she lived with her mother and father until she was 4 years old, after which her family moved to Orange Grove, Johannesburg.

Her family relocated again following the death of her father when she was a girl. She has two younger sisters Bontle and Candice Modiselle who are also in the industry.

In high school she was a hard working learner, but other learners would tease and bully her and that led her to focus on her future.

=== After high school ===
Following her graduation from high school in Johannesburg, Modiselle studied advertising at Varsity College, graduating with distinction in her course.

Throughout her work life Modiselle has accepted modelling work – including modelling for David Tlale at South Africa Fashion Week in 2005.

She has also featured in a number of South African print magazines.

== Career ==
Alongside Soweto-born model Tshegofatso Seakgoe, Modiselle was approached by advertising agency Black River FC in 2012 to be the face of female fashion retailer LEGiT’s summer fashion campaign. The campaign formed part of the retailer’s rebranding, and Modiselle was officially named the retailer’s "brand ambassador" at a launch event in Kyalami, Johannesburg, leading to print and online campaigns, as well as a video advertisement aired on South African television. She followed in a line of LEGiT brand ambassadors including TV presenter and actress Minnie Dlamini, TV presenter Bonang Matheba, model Noni Gasa, actress and model Zizo Beda, and radio and TV personality Sade Giliberti.
