= PDXS =

- Type: Alt-weekly
- Founder(s): Jim and Bill Redden
- Founded: 1991
- Ceased publication: 1998
- Language: English
- City: Portland, Oregon

PDXS was a biweekly tabloid newspaper in Portland in the U.S. state of Oregon from 1991 to 1998. It was founded by Jim Redden, previously a reporter with Willamette Week and subsequently with the Portland Tribune, and his brother Bill Redden, who went on to become a public defender. PDXS focused on arts and culture, as well as news coverage (typically exposé journalism and conspiracy theory.)

PDXS was one of several "local culture" periodicals that launched in the early 1990s, alongside Face Value, Art Rag, Paperback Jukebox, Snipehunt, Metropolis, and Plazm, alongside Reflex, which was published in nearby Seattle and covered the Portland art scene.

== History ==
In 1991, brothers Jim and Bill Redden left the Willamette Week to launched a new publication focused on music called PDXS. Competitors Tonic, Paperback Jukebox, and Blotter all folded within a few months in 1995; that year, Jim Redden and fellow former Willamette Week writer D. K. Holm published a "Hack Attack" column criticizing Willamette Week for abandoning its alternative roots. Holm used the pseudonym "Sid Falco."

In 1996, PDXS sponsored "Anti NXNW," a music festival challenging the "North by Northwest" festival, sponsored by South by Southwest and by Willamette Week, which ran from 1995 to 2001.

By 1999, Jim Redden was running the paper on his own and decided to close so he could focus on book writing. In 2000, he published the book Snitch Culture, which explores how the state and private institutions compromise individual privacy through social and technical means. The book includes a number of Portland incidents.

== Notable coverage ==
=== Larry Hurwitz Investigation ===
Redden published a serial article, "The Larry Hurwitz Story," in 23 issues, which documented accumulating evidence relating to the death of Tim Moreau, who had worked for the Starry Night nightclub. Largely as a result of Redden's investigative work, Hurwitz, who had owned the club at the time, was arrested in 1998 on tax evasion charges, and, after his former employee George Castagnola began cooperating with police in 1998, pleaded no contest to murder, receiving a 12-year sentence.

=== Boxing column ===
Novelist Katherine Dunn contributed a regular boxing column, which typically featured news about local matches. Following boxer Mike Tyson's controversial match with Evander Holyfield, Dunn wrote an article that bucked conventional opinion, contending that Holyfield provoked Tyson with illegal head butts.

== Alumni ==
PDXS was one of the first outlets to publish the writing of Rene Denfeld, who went on to become an acclaimed author.
