= Mari Moen Holsve =

Norwegian writer

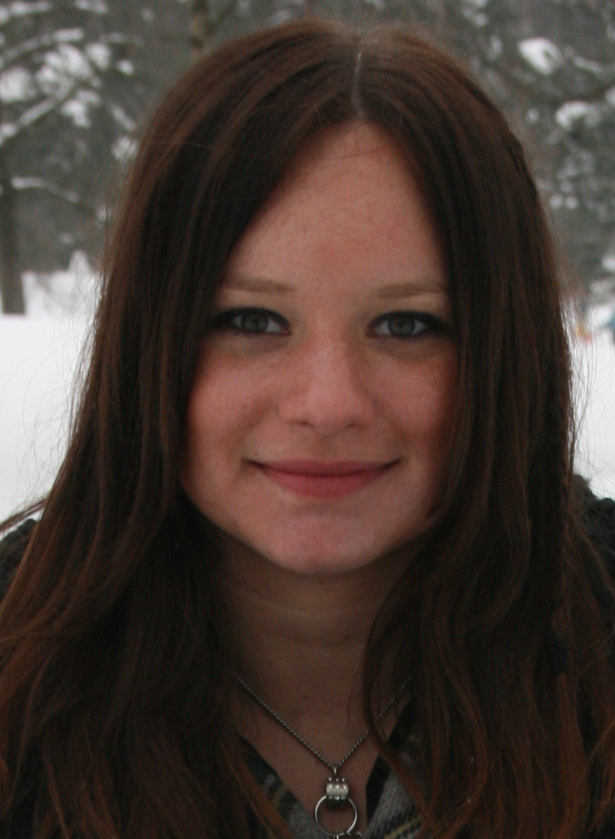
Mari Moen Holsve, 2010

Mari Moen Holsve (born 1986) is a Norwegian children's and young adult fiction writer.

She made her literary debut with the fantasy novel Skjelka-Agenten, issued on Gyldendal, as was her second novel Rasp (2008). In 2011 she published Halvgudene on Cappelen Damm. This book earned her the Ark children's literature prize of 2011, and was followed by Halvgudene II and III in 2012 and 2013. Despite the award, the review in Barnebokkritikk.no criticized Halvgudene for lacking originality.

From 2017 to 2020 she released Ingen sover trygt i natt, Ingen slipper unna and Ingen andre enn oss on Cappelen Damm. Since 2015 she was also contracted to write tales about the characters Asbjørn og Astrid for Sommerles.no, which resulted in books published by Egmont.

Awards
Preceded by Ingunn Aamodt	Recipient of the Ark children's literature prize 2011	Succeeded by Tina Trovik
