= Meme Ditshego =

South African actress (1965–2025)

- Born: Meme Ditshego; May 1965; South Africa
- Died: 25 June 2025 (aged 60); South Africa
- Occupation: Actress
- Years active: 1986–2025
- Spouse: Samson Khumalo

Meme Ditshego (May 1965 – 25 June 2025) was a South African actress. She is best known for the roles in television serials such as Ga Re Dumele and The Coconuts.

== Background ==
Meme Ditshego was born in South Africa in May 1965. She matriculated from high school in 1984.

Ditshego was married to fellow actor Samson Khumalo. She died on 25 June 2025, at the age of 60.

== Career ==
In 1986, she started her acting career with theatre performances. She participated in Township theatre and later joined with the Sibonile Players. Under them, she played the lead role in the play Antigone. Then she joined with the Performing Arts Council of the Transvaal and involved in school programs from 1989 to 1993. Later in 1992, she started to work in children's theatre where she performed in the Afrikaans satirical play Don Gxubane Onner die Boere produced by Charles J. Fourie. In the 2000s, she performed in the stage productions such as; Acropolis Café (2005), The Amen Corner (2008), and MacBeki (2009).

In 1997, she made her television debut with the SABC2 Afrikaans drama mystery serial Sterk Skemer by playing the role "Elsie". Then in 2002, she played the role "Ma Thandi" in the second season of the SABC1 education serial Soul Buddyz. In 2006, she acted in the CBC drama serial Jozi-H with the role "Gladys". Meanwhile, she also appeared in the soap opera Muvhango in the role "Ausi Ntsoaki".

In 2007, she appeared in season two of the SABC2 comedy series Kompleks in a minor role. In 2008, she joined the M-Net sitcom The Coconuts and played the role "Joyce Mlambo" until 2009 in both seasons one and two. In 2010, she played the role "Josephine Ratau" in the SABC2 sitcom Ga Re Dumele. Her role became very popular among the public, and she continued to play the role until the end of season 6 for six consecutive years. For her role, she later won the Best Actress Award in TV Comedy category at the South African Film and Television Awards (SAFTAs) in 2012. For the same award at the 2014 SAFTAs, she was again nominated for her role. In the meantime, she joined the SABC3 sitcom Safe as Hauser's and played the role of "Dotty Sithole" in 2013.

In the same year, she joined two more television serials: SABC2 serial Geraamtes in die Kas in the role "Aunt Ethel", and third season of Mzansi Magic soap opera Zabalaza in the role "Winnie". In 2017, she played the role "Brenda" in the Mzansi Magic serial Imposter. In the same year, she appeared in the e.tv telenovela Broken Vows in the role "Dr Machaka". Then in 2021, she joined the SABC2 comedy drama serial Ak'siSpaza and played the role "Refiloe".

== Filmography ==
Year	Film	Role	Genre	Ref.
1997	Sterk Skemer	Elsie	TV series	
2002	Soul Buddyz	Ma Thandi	TV series	
2006	Jozi-H	Gladys	TV series	
2007	Kompleks	minor role	TV series	
	Muvhango	Ausi Ntsoaki	TV series	
2008	The Coconuts	Joyce Mlambo	TV series	
2009	Erfsondes	Midwife	TV series	
2010	Die Uwe Pottie Potgieter	Gasspeler	TV series	
2010	Ga Re Dumele	Josephine Ratau	TV series	
2010	The Mating Game	Lizzie	TV series	
2013	Geraamtes in die Kas	Aunt Ethel	TV series	
2013	Safe As Hauser's	Dotty Sithole	TV series	
2013	Zabalaza	Winnie	TV series	
2014	Alles Wat Mal Is	Miriam Mhlangu	Film	
2016	Skorokoro	Mr. Sithole	Film	
2017	Imposter	Brenda	TV series	
2017	Broken Vows	Dr Machaka	TV series	
2021	Ak'siSpaza	Refiloe	TV series	
2023	Love, Sex and 30 Candles	Mam Daphne	Film	
