= Nicholas Nkuna =

South African actor

- Born: Sipho Nicholas Nkuna; 18 August 1988 (age 38); Mbombela, Mpumalanga, South Africa
- Other name: Nicksoulworld
- Education: Tshwane University of Technology; Ball State University
- Occupations: Actor, singer, writer
- Years active: 2008–present
- Children: none
- Mother: Norah Nkuna
- Relatives: Fezeka Siwela, Dumsani Siwela

Sipho Nicholas Nkuna (born 18 August 1988) is a South African actor and singer. He is best known for his roles in the popular serial 7de Laan as Fikani and on Erfsondes as Nkululeko "Freedom" Nkosi.

== Personal life ==
He was born on 18 August 1988 in Mbombela, Mpumalanga, South Africa where he grew up in his grandmother's house. He graduated with his Bachelors's degree in Arts from Tshwane University of Technology, Pretoria specialized with musical theater. Then he traveled to Ball State University, Indiana in the US, to study acting.

== Career ==
He started acting career during college years, where he performed in several theater plays such as Parade, Dream Girls, Shaka Zulu, Sophiatown, Oliver Twist, Rent, and Assassins. He also performing in theatres as Simba in the play named He also performed in the play The Lion King where he toured Ireland and UK with the play. At the age of 22, Nkuna became the second African actor to play in the popular play Phantom of the Opera.

In 2015, he auditioned for the television series, Skeem Saam, through an agent, which became his maiden television appearance. In the serial, he played the role of 'Sakhile'. In 2017, he took a 3-year break, where he rejoined in October 2020. In the same year, he participated in the BET acting competition series, Top Actor Africa. In the competition, he emerged as the runner-up. Then he appeared in the soap opera Roer Jou Voete and played the role 'Shakes Mbebe' in late 2015. In 2016, he appeared in the serial Keeping Score, and played a minor role as Congolese athlete 'Issac'. In the same year, he was invited to play a guest role on the popular serial Rhythm City.

Since 2017, he plays the popular role 'Fikani Chauke' in the series 7de Laan. He won the Best Supporting Actor Award at the 2016 South African Broadway World Awards for his role 'Mingus' in the play Sophiatown. Then he acted in the series Erfsondes as 'Freedom'. Apart from television, he also starred in the films, Love by Chance and Meet the Radebes.

Apart from acting, he is also a prolific singer. Two of his songs were featured in a film starring Khanyi Mbau "Red Room "and his song Thando is featured on Meet the RAdebes. Nicholas also known as Nicksoul has a South African music award nomination for his first soul/r&b album titled Therapy released in 2018.

== Filmography ==
Year	Film	Role	Genre	Ref.
2016	Crossworlds	Zuko	Short film	
2017	Black Dots	Vusi	Short film	
2017	Love By Chance	Aaron	Film	
2017	Meet the Radebes	Aaron	Film	
2018	Baby Mamas	Sizwe	Film	
2018	Ibutho		TV series	
2019	Red Room	Jonas	Film	
2020	7de Laan	Fikani Chauke	TV series	
2023	Love, Sex and 30 Candles	Lehumo	Film	
