= Thutolore Secondary School =

Government school in Madubane Street Zone, Meadowlands, Soweto

Location
- 26.2141°S 27.9037°E

Information
- Type: Government
- School code: 700141002

Thutolore Secondary School is a government secondary school on Madubane Street in Soweto, Johannesburg.

== History ==
The school had some involvement in the Soweto Uprising which started on 16 June 1976. This started with a student march from the schools of Soweto objecting to a government order that schools should use Afrikaans to teach certain subjects.

A crisis meeting was held at Thutolore School on the weekend of 6 March 1976, where local parents firmly rejected the idea of instruction in Afrikaans. The parents noted that they paid for the education and instructed the representative of the "homeland" of Bophuthatswana to take their objection to the central government.

Bontle Modiselle who has an association with the company Always led dancing and a talk at the school in Meadowlands, Soweto in May 2023. Bontle encouraged girls to stay in school despite period poverty. 100 girls received six months supply of pads in honor of Menstrual Hygiene Day.
