= Love, Sex and 30 Candles =

- Directed by: Stephina Zwane
- Screenplay by: Zoe Laband; Stephina Zwane
- Based on: The 30th Candle by Angela Makholwa
- Produced by: Noni Ntelani
- Starring: Bahumi Madisakwane; Candice Modiselle; Gabisile Tshabalala; Amogelang Chidi
- Cinematography: Bradley Devine
- Production companies: Sorele Media; AAA Entertainment
- Distributed by: Netflix
- Release date: 18 August 2023
- Running time: 106 minutes
- Country: South Africa
- Language: English

Love, Sex and 30 Candles is a 2023 Netflix Original South African movie, directed by Stephina Zwane, starring Bahumi Madisakwane, Candice Modiselle, Gabisile Tshabalala, and Amogelang Chidi. The story is based on The 30th Candle book by Angela Makholwa.

Through a year of 30th birthdays, four best friends navigate relationships, heartbreak, and a shocking development that threatens to tear them apart.

== Plot ==
When at college, best friends Sade, Linda, Nolwazi and Dikeledi 'Kedi' made a video, sharing their hopes for themselves by 30.

Commitment phobe Linda dumps fiancé Lehumo because she doesn't love him after they had sex. Unmarried mother Kedi is a university professor. Although she's been seeing her daughter's father Tebogo regularly over 10 years, he doesn't make time for his daughter. Sade is engaged to extremely religious, controlling Winston, who won't have premarital sex with her and is disapproving of her friends and alcohol.

Nolwazi's 30th birthday comes first. Although she works in fashion, she wishes to have her own line. She announces she's pregnant. Linda's estranged father tries to contact her, but she is wary. When her mother is hospitalized due to diabetes, she has her move in. One evening, home after a date, Linda tells her mom about e-mailing with her father, who encourages her to forgive him.

Nolwazi tells Tebogo she's pregnant, so he offers to support her abortion, but she refuses. Giving him her first obstetrician appointment, he's not interested as he's finally proposing to Kedi. The engagement announcement coincides with Nolwazi getting her own line.

At Kedi's engagement party, Sade complains about Winston not letting her prepare the wedding, choose the dress, maid of honor, etc. Linda announces she's stopped dating and wants to take Kennedy seriously. Nolwazi, who's been noticeably absent, explains she's super busy with her upcoming fashion show. Kedi insists on giving her her daughter's hand-me-downs, and asks she include them in her pregnancy. Later, Linda finds her mom unconscious. The friends meet again at the hospital in support of Linda and her mother. The emergency was a pulmonary aneurism.

Both engaged friends get frustrated by their fiancés, Sade for the continued sexism and Kedi for Tebogo's continual absenteeism. Kedi coincides with psychology professor, Kwame Osei in a dance class where they are partners. Afterwards over drinks, she confesses she has a celebrity crush on the author. They kiss, and she rushes off, mortified.

Nolwazi's boss Ephry pushes her to be original, as she's obviously been tweaking 'tired', past creations. He encourages her to consult their team, who help her open up creatively.

At Sade's bridal shower, thrown by the matron of honor Winston chose, the pastor's wife, is a very chaste affair. The friends group quietly heckle the sect amongst themselves. All but Kedi see Tebogo's threatening message about Nolwazi's pregnancy, so she swears them to secrecy. An extremely drunk and belligerent Winston hits Sade at home. He heard she was permiscuous in college at his bachelor's party, but had expected her to be a virgin.

The next morning the friends group visit Sade for her birthday, and she tells them about the beating. Her wedding is later that day and she asks them only for their support, although they are appalled. At the ceremony, Tebogo harasses the noticeably pregnant Nolwazi. She finally confesses the affair to Kedi, who cuts ties with the group upon discovering everyone knows.

Describing her tumultuous life's influence on her collection to Ephry, Nolwazi details the specific relevant events. Titled 'Kedi' in her honor, as a great friend, mother and mother figure. Sade's husband won't consummate the marriage, even a month after the wedding, until she is purified. Then he demands she give up her job and her friends.

On Kedi's 30th birthday, still angry, she turns her friends away. Afterwards, Linda finds her father by her mother in the hospital, discovering her parents had been in contact for awhile. He sincerely apologizes for having abandoned them years ago and promises to be there for Linda. She collapses into his arms, devastated as they must remove her life support, but he's there to support her. Kwame goes to wish Kedi a happy birthday, and finds her crying after watching filmmaker Linda's birthday tribute. He suggests she forgive them, as true friends are hard to find. Kedi goes to Linda's upon hearing her news and they reconcile.

Meanwhile, just as Nolwazi's successful show finishes, she doubles over in pain. The hospital calls her emergency contact Kedi, and the friend group rushes there. Diagnosed with eclampsia, she's given a 50-50 chance of survival, nonetheless they pull through. She names the baby after Linda's late mom.

Sade catches Winston having sex with the preacher's wife as she's collecting her things, happily snapping a photo for the divorce. Kedi gets together with Prof Kwame Osei. At Linda's belated birthday, the group celebrate each other.

== Cast ==
=== Main ===
- Bahumi Madisakwane as Nolwazi
- Candice Modiselle as Linda
- Gabisile Tshabalala as Sade
- Amogelang Chidi as Dikeledi

=== Supporting ===
- Terence Bridgett as Ephry
- Lunga Shabalala as Tebogo
- Loyiso Macdonald as Winston
- Clementine Mosimane as Siphokazi
- Anthony Oseyemi as Prof. Kwame Osei
- Iminathi Sibeko as Phemelo
- Nicholas Nkuna as Lehumo
- Sipho Mbele as Lennona
- Lehlohonolo Makoko as Enzokuhle
- Lebo Msiza as Kennedy
- Meme Ditshego as Mam Daphne
- Thandy Matlaila as Palesa

== Premiere and release ==
On 27 June 2023, Netflix announced the release of Love, Sex, and 30 Candles in the month of July. On 15 August 2023, a local premiere was held at Nu Metro in Hyde Park, South Africa. On 18 August 2023, the movie was released globally on Netflix.

== Reception ==
Reviewing for Ready Steady Cut, Amanda Guarragi wrote; "What this film shows is the constant strength that women have to harness when dealing with situations that really shouldn’t be happening to them because certain men act on impulses".

Martin Cid Magazine wrote in its review; "Love, Sex and 30 Candles" promises to break away from tradition but continually reverts back to its more traditional side, particularly in its cinematography treatment.
