= Come Dine with Me South Africa =

2011 Television series

Come Dine With Me South Africa is a television series that made its debut on BBC Entertainment in South Africa in October 2011. The series is produced by Rapid Blue. It proved to be a success, attracting over 100,000 viewers per premiere episode and reaching more than 2.5 million DStv viewers overall.

Come Dine With Me South Africa follows four strangers as they visit one another's homes for dinner and attempt to outwit and impress fellow guests with their culinary and hospitality skills in a bid to win a cash prize of R10,000 and Pick n Pay vouchers.

Episode 1 of the first series kicked off with two ladies from the south east of Johannesburg, Estie Matheus and Michelle Jordan, jointly winning and sharing the prizes. The series concluded with a celebrity special featuring M-Net presenter Ashley Hayden, SuperSport's Neil Andrews, 94.7 Highveld Stereo's Sam Cowen and model Shashi Naidoo.

Distributed by ITV Studios Global Entertainment, the show is produced in 36 territories internationally including Germany, France and Australia. The show won a South African Film and Television Award in 2011.

The show was cancelled in April 2014. It then returned to BBC Brit for a fourth season in 2018.
