= Tshegofatso Seakgoe =

South African model and actress

- Born: 8 March 1990 (age 36); Meadowlands, Gauteng
- Occupations: Actress, model
- Years active: 2010-present
- Modelling information
- Hair colour: Black
- Eye colour: Brown

Tshegofatso Seakgoe (born 8 March 1990) is a South African model and actress. She was born in Meadowlands, Gauteng in South Africa. She was the winner of a model-photography competition run by ELLE Magazine South Africa in 2010.

== Early life ==
She was born and raised in Meadowlands, Soweto (in Gauteng, South Africa) and lived with her mother, until she died in 1999. She then moved to stay with her father, step-mother, three younger brothers and one younger step-brother in Alberton, Gauteng.

As a girl, she was interested in the entertainment industry and took part in a number of television features, including being featured on children's entertainment channel YOT V 4 and singing for Nelson Mandela at his 80th birthday celebration. At 5 ft 6 in (1.68 m) she always believed she was too short to be a model.

== After high school ==
Following her graduation from Greenside High School in Gauteng, South Africa, Tshegofatso started a course in management. She dropped out after three months and decided to take a break from studies. She worked as a receptionist for a short time and then decided to return to studies and to study Political Studies and Journalism at Monash University.

== Career ==
Six months into her university course, in 2010, a friend approached her to be a model for his photography entry into a competition for ELLE Magazine South Africa. She won the competition with her friend. A friend, working as a make-up artist on the ELLE Magazine shoot, advised her to seek an agent. She signed with Ayana Africa Management and attended castings for six months with no luck.

In May 2011, Tshegofatso became the first black South African to adorn the cover of Playboy.

Tshegofatso has become a prominent actress, with recent appearances in the TV show The Throne and presenting at the 2020 Dubai Expo.

In 2020 Tshegofatso started her own YouTube channel, although her showreel was added just before that. In April 2020 Tshegofatso answered 21 questions about herself, adopting a Vogue (magazine) styled Vlog interview.

=== LEGiT Campaign ===
Tshegofatso was approached by advertising agency Black River FC to work on their campaign with female fashion retailer LEGiT, part of the Edcon stable. She followed in a line of brand ambassadors including TV presenter and actress Minnie Dlamini, TV presenter Bonang Matheba, model Noni Gasa and radio and TV personality Sade Giliberti.

=== Playboy Magazine South Africa ===
When her friend started working for Playboy Magazine South Africa, she was approached to attend a casting for the magazine's first few issues. She attended the casting and was selected as a playmate. After a review by the South African Playboy staff, she was chosen as the cover star for their local May issue.

== Filmography ==
Year	Title	Role	Target
2018	The Throne	Co-Star	Television
2017	Broken Vows	Co-Star	Television
2016	Keeping Score	Co-Star	Television
2016	The Queen Mzansi	Co-Star	Television
2015	State Enemy no. 1	Principle	Feature Film
