= Feather Award =

Dance award

The Feather Award is the most notable achievement in the field of dance, "the dancer's equivalent to the Oscars" or Academy Awards.

Feather Award Recipients: Lifetime Achievement: Joe Cassini, presenter: Ann-Margret
