= Abdallah Possi =

Tanzanian diplomat

His Excellency Abdallah Saleh Possi Ambassador
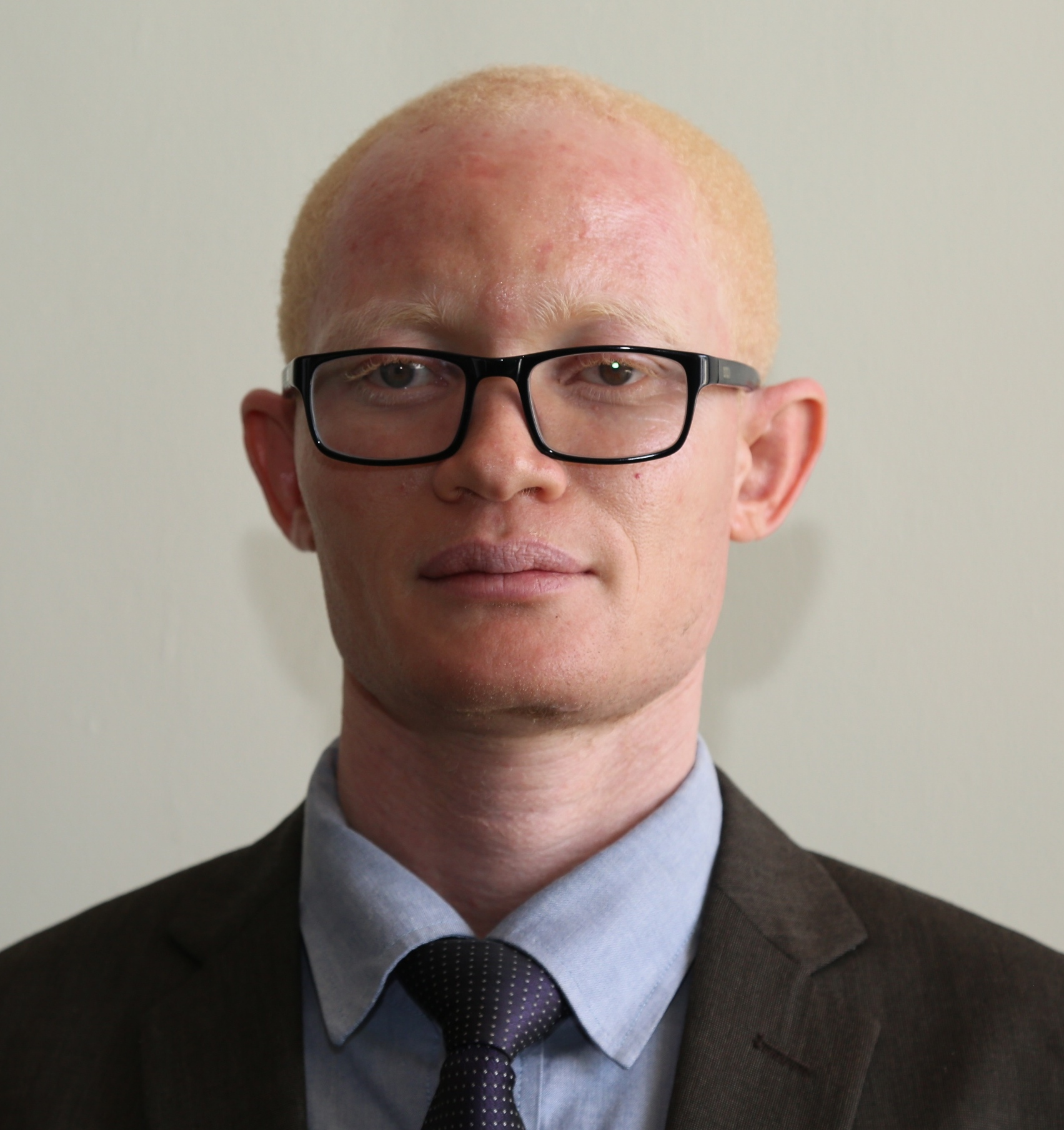

Tanzania's Permanent Representative to The United Nations Office, Geneva
- Incumbent
- Assumed office June 2023
- Preceded by: Maimuna Tarishi

Personal details
- Born: 25 August 1979 (age 47) Dar es Salaam, Tanzania
- Education: University of Dar es Salaam (LL.B., LL.M.); University of Erlangen–Nuremberg (Dr.phil.)

Abdallah Saleh Possi (born 25 August 1979) is a Tanzanian diplomat who serves as Tanzania's Permanent Representative to The United Nations Office and other International Organisations in Geneva. Before, he served as Tansania's Ambassador to Germany, and was also accredited to Austria (until May 2022), Bulgaria, Czech Republic, the Holy See, Hungary, Poland, Romania, Slovakia and Switzerland. Before assuming his first Diplomatic obligations, Possi had served as a Member of Parliament and the Deputy Minister of State in the Prime Minister's Office responsible for Persons with Disability. Previously, he worked as a lecturer at the University of Dodoma in Tanzania; and practiced as an Advocate of the High Court of Tanzania. He had also worked as a tutor at the Institute of Judicial Administration in Lushoto, Tanga, Tanzania. He holds LL.B. and LL.M. from the University of Dar es Salaam (Tanzania), and a Dr. phil. from the University of Erlangen–Nuremberg in Germany. Possi is married and has three children.

== Works ==
- POSSI, A. (2018) 'Integrating Persons with Disabilities in the East African Labour Market A Comparative Analysis of Employment and Disability Laws in Tanzania, Kenya and Uganda', in J. DÖVELING et al. (eds), Harmonisation of Laws in the East African Community: the State of Affairs with Comparative Insights from the European Union and other Regional Economic Communities, 5 TGCL Series, 213–242.
- POSSI, A. & POSSI, A. 'The identity Question versus Appropriateness of legal Anti-discrimination Measures: Endorsing the Disability Rights Approach to Albinism', African Disability Rights Yearbook, 5 (2017), 118 -140. Abdallah Possi & Ally Possi
- POSSI, A. 'Implementing Article 33 of the CRPD: Tanzanian approach', African Disability Rights Yearbook, 4 (2016), 191–210. Abdallah Possi
- POSSI, A. 'Relating Equality and Disability Approaches in Tanzania: The Law in Tanzania Mainland and Zanzibar', Zanzibar Yearbook of Law, 5 (2015), 3 – 29.
- POSSI, A. 'Criminal Justice in Disrepute: An Overview of Treatment of Accused Persons and Convicts in Tanzania', The Open University Law Journal, 1/1 (2007), 83–97.
