= Bjørn Beltø =

Bjørn Beltø is a fictional crime novel character created by Tom Egeland, the great-grandson of the writer Jon Flatabø. In an interview with the newspaper Aftenposten, Egeland explained that the protagonist Bjørn Beltø in the novel Sirkelens ende (published in English under the title Relic) and other works is named after two pseudonyms used by Flatabø: Bjørn Botnen and Sven Beltø.

== Beltø ==
Bjørn Beltø is an archaeologist and an albino. In the novels he is trained not only in archaeology, but also in religious and theological mysteries.

== Appears in ==
- Sirkelens ende (Relic, 2001)
- Paktens voktere (Guardians of the Covenant, 2007)
- Lucifers evangelium (Gospel of Lucifer, 2009)
- Nostradamus' testamente (The Testament of Nostradamus, 2012)
- Den 13. disippel (The Thirteenth Disciple, 2014)
- Djevelmasken (The Devil Mask, 2016)
- Lasaruseffekten (2017)
- Codex (2018)
