= Jon Flatabø =

Norwegian writer (1846–1930)

Jon Flatabø (April 7, 1846 – February 10, 1930) was a Norwegian writer of popular literature at the beginning of the 20th century.

Flatabø was born in Vikør Municipality (now Kvam) in the Hardanger district, and was educated as a teacher. Later he worked as a sexton, newspaper editor, writer, and man of letters, among other activities.

Flatabø was a typical representative of popular literature in the early 20th century. After working in Hardanger, Odal, Elverum, Jarlsberg, and elsewhere, he relocated to Kristiania (now Oslo) in the 1880s, where he worked as a newspaper editor and popular writer. He was part of the movement known as the Kristiania Bohemians.

His depictions of the lives and concerns of ordinary farmers—in works such as Brudefærden i Hardanger (The Bridal Procession in Hardanger), Petra, perlen fra Smaalenene (Petra, the Pearl of Østfold), Husmannsdatteren fra Odalen (The Farmer's Daughter from Odal), Fattiges gjenvordigheter (Needy Adversity), and Hun fridde selv (She Redeemed Herself)—sold very well, much more so than works by the prominent poets of the time. Together with Rudolf Muus, Flatabø was one of the first best-selling Norwegian authors of popular literature.

In 1948, the poet Inger Hagerup wrote the following about Flatabø:

During my childhood we had a wonderful novel writer in Norway. He was called Jon Flatabø and he died some years ago, old and full of days, reportedly at the age of eighty-five. There was a man who knew how novels should be written. He rarely produced a book that was under five hundred pages. Bruderovet i Hardanger (The Bride in Hardanger), which I remember in particular because it is associated with a distinct odor of burnt waffles, was fourteen hundred pages, and there was excitement and love on every page. Signe, prestens forlovede (Signe, the Priest's Fiancee) and Petra, perlen fra Smålenene (Petra, the Pearl of Østfold) were also among Flatabø's bestsellers. Daydreams were easier then than now; virtue was always rewarded (unless the person drowned himself, something the good-natured Flatabø incidentally only had the heart to have happen once), and vice was emphatically punished in every case. It was easy to follow the events for both the reader and the writer. But then there came the psychological novel, and with that it went wrong with so many people.

Flatabø was the great-grandfather of the author Tom Egeland. In an interview with the newspaper Aftenposten, Egeland stated that the character Bjørn Beltø in the novel Sirkelens ende (published in English under the title Relic) is named after two pseudonyms used by Flatabø: Bjørn Botnen and Sven Beltø. Another pseudonym that Flatabø used was Olav Isjøkul.

Flatabø died in Oslo.
