= Katherine Dunn =

American novelist, journalist, poet

- Born: Katherine Karen Dunn; October 24, 1945; Garden City, Kansas, U.S.
- Died: May 11, 2016 (aged 70); Portland, Oregon, U.S.
- Education: Reed College
- Occupation: Writer
- Years active: 1965–2016
- Notable work: Geek Love
- Spouse: Paul Pomerantz
- Children: 1

Katherine Karen Dunn (October 24, 1945 – May 11, 2016) was an American novelist, journalist, voice artist, radio personality, book reviewer, and poet from Portland, Oregon. She is best known for her novel Geek Love (1989). She was also a prolific writer on boxing.

== Early life and education ==
Dunn was born in Garden City, Kansas, on October 24, 1945, the second-youngest of five children. Her father left the family before she was two. Her mother, Velma Golly, an artist from a farming family in Velva, North Dakota, subsequently married a car mechanic who had grown up in a commercial-fishing family working trawlers out of Puget Sound.

During the 1950s, the family moved frequently in search of work, at times following the crops as migrant farm laborers and spending several years tenant farming in western Oregon, before settling in Tigard, Oregon, when Dunn was about twelve; there her stepfather managed gas stations and Dunn attended junior high school and Tigard High School. Dunn's childhood was marked by poverty and by her mother's violence; her mother was, according to Dunn's biographer, abusive and thought to be mentally ill. Dunn left home for good at seventeen.

At eighteen, in 1963, Dunn joined a traveling crew selling fraudulent magazine subscriptions door-to-door in the Midwest, and was arrested in Missouri for attempting to cash a customer's bad check, spending time in the Jackson County jail. The experience, which left her with a felony conviction, became the basis of her autobiographical first novel, Attic (1970).

Dunn attended Portland State College before winning a full scholarship to Reed College in 1965. She had become fascinated with Reed as a teenager after reading a magazine article about calligraphy professor Lloyd Reynolds, to the point of sneaking onto campus to eat in the dining commons and sleep under dormitory stairs. She began as a philosophy major but switched to psychology after struggling in an aesthetics class. To support herself in college she worked as a topless dancer, a nude model for art students, and a writer of other students' term papers, and hustled pool. She dropped out of Reed in 1967 after meeting Dante Dapolonia during a school break in San Francisco's Haight-Ashbury district, and never graduated.

== Later life and career ==
Dunn began her first novel Attic (1970) while studying at Reed College. During a Christmas break trip to Ashbury Heights in 1967 she met a man she would spend the next ten years with. Together, they traveled to Mexico, Boston, Newfoundland, and Seville, where she finished Attic, then to Karpathos. Here, she finished her second novel, Truck (1971), and became pregnant. She gave birth to her son in Dublin, Ireland. After living for seven years at various locations, they returned to Portland to stay "because there was a good alternative public school", namely the Metropolitan Learning Center. She settled in the Nob Hill neighborhood, where she resided until her death.

Dunn waited tables in the morning before her son woke up, and tended bars at night, painted houses, and did voice-over work. In the 1970s, she hosted a radio show on Portland's community radio station KBOO, during which she read short fiction by other authors. She taught advanced classes in creative writing at Oregon's Lewis & Clark College and a graduate course in the same subject at Pacific University in Forest Grove, Oregon.

In 1981, Dunn began writing about boxing in Willamette Week. She went on to cover the sport for a number of publications, including PDXS, The Oregonian, and The New York Times. She has been described as "one of the better boxing writers in the United States". She started boxing training in her 40s.

She was an editor and contributor for the online boxing magazine cyberboxingzone.com. In the 1990s, Dunn wrote a regular column on boxing for PDXS, in which she at one time provided detailed criticism of Evander Holyfield's sportsmanship in his controversial fight with Mike Tyson. She won the Dorothea Lange–Paul Taylor Prize in 2004 for her work on School of Hard Knocks: The Struggle for Survival in America's Toughest Boxing Gyms. Her essays on boxing were collected in her 2009 collection One Ring Circus: Dispatches from the World of Boxing.

Her third published novel was Geek Love (1989), and it was by far her best-known work. It was a finalist for the National Book Award for Fiction and for the Bram Stoker Award for Best Novel. Dunn described her memory of when she began writing it in the late 1970s, walking to Portland's Washington Park Rose Garden, contemplating nature versus nurture. It remains a strong seller, with over a half-million copies sold, never having gone out of print.

In 1989, Dunn announced that she was working on a new novel, entitled The Cut Man. As of 1999, she was still working on the project. In 2008, it was reported that publisher Alfred A. Knopf had scheduled The Cut Man for release that September. The novel remains unpublished. An excerpt was published in the summer 2010 issue of The Paris Review under the title "Rhonda Discovers Art".

In 2012, Dunn reunited with Paul Pomerantz, her boyfriend from Reed College, and they married. Dunn died on May 11, 2016. Her son stated her death was from complications of lung cancer.

== Posthumous publications ==
In 2022, the third novel she wrote, Toad (1971), was published posthumously by Farrar, Straus and Giroux with an introduction by Molly Crabapple, making it her fourth published novel (although it was written before Geek Love). In 1971 Harper and Row, who had published her novels Attic and Truck, had also bought the rights to Toad. However, they ultimately did not publish it. It is about “a woman who has retreated into a life of isolation following a breakdown reflects on her time as an impoverished college student in the early 1970s in Portland, Oregon at the height of the women’s liberation movement, and the group of wealthy trust fund kids she befriends.” It was rejected by other publishers in years following, and after 1979 she set the book aside. It was only published because it was found in her archives at Lewis & Clark College by Naomi Huffman, an editor. Dunn's son and others pushed to have this work finally published.

A short story related to Toad, "The Resident Poet", was published by The New Yorker in 2020. Another short story, "The Education of Mrs. R.", was published by The Paris Review in 2022. Near Flesh, a book of her short stories, was published in 2025.

== Bibliography ==
=== Fiction ===
==== Novels ====
- Attic (1970)
- Truck (1971)
- Geek Love (1989)
- Toad (2022)

==== Short stories ====
- 3 Day Fox: A Tattoo (1979) (chapbook)
- "The Resident Poet". The New Yorker. May 11, 2020.
- "The Education of Mrs. R.". The Paris Review. Fall 2022.
- Near Flesh (2025) (short story collection)

=== Nonfiction ===
- The Slice: Information with an Attitude (1989)
- "Just as Fierce". Mother Jones. November/December 1994.
- "Call of the Wild." Vogue. June 1995.
- Death Scenes: A Homicide Detective's Scrapbook (1996) (linking text for photography collection)
- "An Introduction to Lucius Shepard". The Magazine of Fantasy & Science Fiction. 100 (3): 4–10. March 2001.
- One Ring Circus: Dispatches from the World of Boxing (2009)
