= Stanley Kaoni =

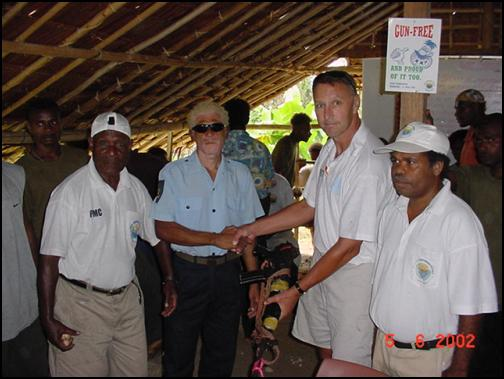
Stanley Kaoni hands his gun to New Zealand Police

Stanley Kaoni is a militant leader in the Solomon Islands.

== Life and arrest ==
He is an albino, and is known on the islands as Sataan or Satan. He was formerly a commander of the Isatabu Freedom Movement.

Kaoni was arrested in 2003 and convicted in 2005 of crimes including robbery and abduction.

== See also ==
- Harold Keke
