= They Thirst =

1981 novel by Robert R. McCammon

- First edition
- Author: Robert R. McCammon
- Language: English
- Genre: Horror
- Publisher: Avon Books
- Publication date: 1981
- Publication place: United States
- Media type: Print (paperback, hardback), e-book
- Pages: 554
- ISBN: 0380771802 (first edition paperback)

They Thirst is a horror novel by American writer Robert R. McCammon, first published in 1981 and republished in 1991 in hardback. The book details the relentless possession of Los Angeles by vampires, who quickly transform the city into a necropolis with the intent to conquer the entire world.

Plans to create a TV movie were announced in 1992, but attempts to make the film were unsuccessful.

They Thirst is one of the author's earlier novels and one that he intentionally kept out of print for many years. He stated that while he did not dislike the book itself he did not feel it was up to the standards of his later works. After years of unavailability it was released as an e-book in 2013, and republished by Subterranean in 2015.

== Plot ==
The prologue starts in Hungary as young Andy is waiting for his father to come home after a hunting trip. His father comes in late but is different. Andy comes to his father when told to and finds he is pale and cold. Andy's mother, suspecting that he is a creature he was hunting for, shoots him. His face is blown apart but continues to come after the two. They then run away into the cold blizzard. His father shouts "I'LL FIND YOU" as they run away. Andy and his mother finally go to a house away from their town.

Later, Andy, now a Los Angeles detective, is trying to find the Roach, who rapes, murders, and then puts cockroaches in the mouth of his victims. Andy's work leaves him stressed from the relentless hours he must put in on the case. Meanwhile, an albino sociopath killer is making his way to Los Angeles by the calls of someone and visions. At a bar in Texas he kills everyone with a Mauser. Eventually he makes his way to Los Angeles. Gayle Clark is a reporter and while going to work with her boyfriend they find the Hollywood Cemetery is ransacked. The people who did this left the bodies in a road and stole the coffins. Andy is told of this and goes to the watchman to tell him what to do if it happens again; to just stay in the house and close the blinds. At the same time Rico, a Chicano gangster, finds out that his girlfriend is pregnant. The girl runs away after Rico inquires if the child is his. The girl continues on the lam while Rico tries to find her. Eventually she is overtaken by the vampires on a dark street. That same night Wes Richer is having a large party after his successful comedy show. His wife, who is a medium, attempts, at the urging of a non-believer, to have a vision using a Ouija board. She is told by a spirit that there's evil and when she asks "what is this evil," it replies, "THEY THIRST"

Before dawn the Prince Vampire is in Disneyland and sees the Headmaster. The Headmaster tells him that endless possibilities will be possible once he conquers Los Angeles. When seen after talking to him by a watchman he turns into a large bat and flies away.

== Reception ==
Critical reception for the book was mixed to positive. Publishers Weekly gave a positive review for They Thirst, praising McCammon's writing.
