= Geek Love =

1989 novel by Katherine Dunn

- Author: Katherine Dunn
- Cover artist: David Hughes
- Language: English
- Genre: Novel
- Publisher: Catherine Marshal
- Publication date: 1989
- Publication place: United States
- Media type: Print (hardback & paperback)
- Pages: 368
- ISBN: 0-394-56902-4
- OCLC: 18464835
- Dewey Decimal: 813/.54 19
- LC Class: PS3554.U47 G4 1989

Geek Love is a novel by American writer Katherine Dunn, published completely by Alfred A. Knopf (a division of Random House) in 1989. Dunn published parts of the novel in Mississippi Mud Book of Days (1983) and Looking Glass Bookstore Review (1988). It was a finalist for the National Book Award.

The novel is the story of a traveling carnival run by Aloysius "Al" Binewski and his wife "Crystal" Lil, and their children, seen through the eyes of their daughter Olympia ("Oly"), who writes the family history for her daughter Miranda. When the business begins to fail, the couple devise an idea to breed their own freak show, using various drugs and radioactive material to alter the genes of their children. The results are Arturo ("Arty", also known as "Aqua Boy"), a boy with flippers for hands and feet; Electra ("Elly") and Iphigenia ("Iphy"), Siamese twins; Olympia ("Oly"), a hunchbacked albino dwarf; and Fortunato ("Chick"), the normal-looking baby of the family who has telekinetic powers.

== Plot summary ==
The novel takes place in two interwoven time periods: the first deals with the Binewski children's constant struggle against each other through life. They especially have to deal with the Machiavellian Arty as he develops his own cult: Arturism. In this cult, Arty persuades people to have their limbs amputated (so that they can be like him) in their search for the principle he calls PIP ("Peace, Isolation, Purity"). Each member moves up in stages, losing increasingly significant chunks of their body, starting with their toes and fingers. As Arty battles his siblings to maintain control over his followers, competition between their respective freak shows slowly begins to take over their lives.

The second story is set in the present and is centered on Oly's daughter, Miranda. Nineteen-year-old Miranda does not know Oly is her mother. She lives on a trust fund created by Oly before she gave up her daughter to be raised by nuns. This had been urged by her brother Arty, who was also Miranda's father (not through sexual intercourse, but by the telekinetic powers of Chick, who carried Arty's sperm directly to Oly's ovum). Oly lives in the same rooming house as Miranda so she can "spy" on her. (The rooming house is run by "Crystal" Lil, who is so addled that she doesn't know Oly is her daughter.) Miranda has a special defect of her own, a small tail, which she flaunts at a local fetish strip club. There she meets Mary Lick, who tries to persuade her to have the tail cut off. Lick is a wealthy woman who pays attractive women to get disfiguring operations, ostensibly so they may live up to their potential instead of becoming sex objects; it is implied, however, that Lick's real motivation is to punish them for being more attractive than she is. Oly plans to stop Lick in order to protect her daughter.

== Genesis ==
Dunn has said she remembers when she began writing the book in the late '70s, walking to Portland's Washington Park Rose Garden, contemplating nature versus nurture. Her interest in cults also led to elements of the book. She has described the genesis of the book, which took her nearly ten years to write and more than that to publish it, in 1989. She said "All the time I was working on Geek Love, it was like my own private autism."

== Publishing design ==
The book's original cover art by Chip Kidd caused a sensation at book conventions when it was introduced in 1989. Its plain, stark orange color and unusual fonts went against conventional design aesthetics. In keeping with the novel's theme of mutation, the lettering of the title employs mutated fonts, and the book's spine sports a five-legged dog, an alteration of the Knopf logo of a Russian wolfhound, that Kidd slipped past the publisher and which was not noticed until after the initial print run.

== Reception and legacy ==
The novel was published on March 11, 1989, with an initial printing of 20,000 copies. As of 2014 the book sold more than 400,000 copies, 10,000 of them ebooks.

Jim Rose (of the Jim Rose Circus) has said that "Dunn set the table for this whole modern freak-show vibe". Novelist Karen Russell described the prose as "pyrotechnic medium so far removed from our workaday speech that it feels unfair and inaccurate to call that fire-language 'English'".

The novel was a finalist for the National Book Award in 1989.

In 1992, the British band Bang Bang Machine released the single "Geek Love", about the novel. The song topped the John Peel Festive 50 that year.

Tim Burton bought the rights to the book in the 1990s, but there has been no word about it since. In an interview, Dunn stated, "He's got the rights. That's half the battle right there. Though it no longer seems like something he'd do. It's a little too horror for him now in my opinion. Though I would love to see this film get made." The Wachowskis also have expressed interest in adapting it for the screen, and Warner Bros. decided to purchase the adaptation rights "indefinitely".

In January 2004, theatre company Sensurround Stagings in Atlanta, Georgia, produced a well-received stage adaptation of Geek Love. This adaptation was reprised in Atlanta for summer 2004 and then taken to the New York Fringe Festival later that year.
