= Al Beeno =

- Also known as: Prince Yellowman
- Born: Corrie Ludlow Moody; Kingston, Jamaica
- Origin: Toronto, Ontario, Canada
- Genres: Reggae
- Instrument: Turntables

Corrie Ludlow "Al Beeno" Moody, also known as Prince Yellowman, is a reggae dancehall deejay musician.

Moody was born in Kingston, Jamaica. He later moved to Toronto, Ontario, Canada. He was born with a rare skin condition, albinism, the absence of pigmentation in his skin, hair and eyes (i.e. albino); he made the most of this by calling himself Al Beeno.

His lyrical style (mixed with hip hop urban beats, also known as ragga) with fast beats earned him the nickname 'Prince Yellowman'; this is a reference to dancehall artist King Yellowman, also an albino, who became popular during the early 1980s and throughout the 1990s.

In 1995, Al Beeno was the opening performer at one of the largest reggae concerts held in Toronto; other guest performers included Buju Banton, Bounty Killer and Cocoa Tea. Al Beeno's first music video What's My Name came from his debut release "The Colour of My Life" and aired in 2004. More recently he appeared with Parm B on Randi J's track "Rattan Nu". In 2018 he released a track "Mama Tell Me".

Another track by Al Beeno is "Fifi Music Group" (a track similar to 'What's My Name'), and some lesser known ones are: "Infatuated with Kris Kelly", "Wake up Call" and "Get Love".
