= Ayanda Candice Sibanda =

Zimbabwean model and activist

Ayanda Candice
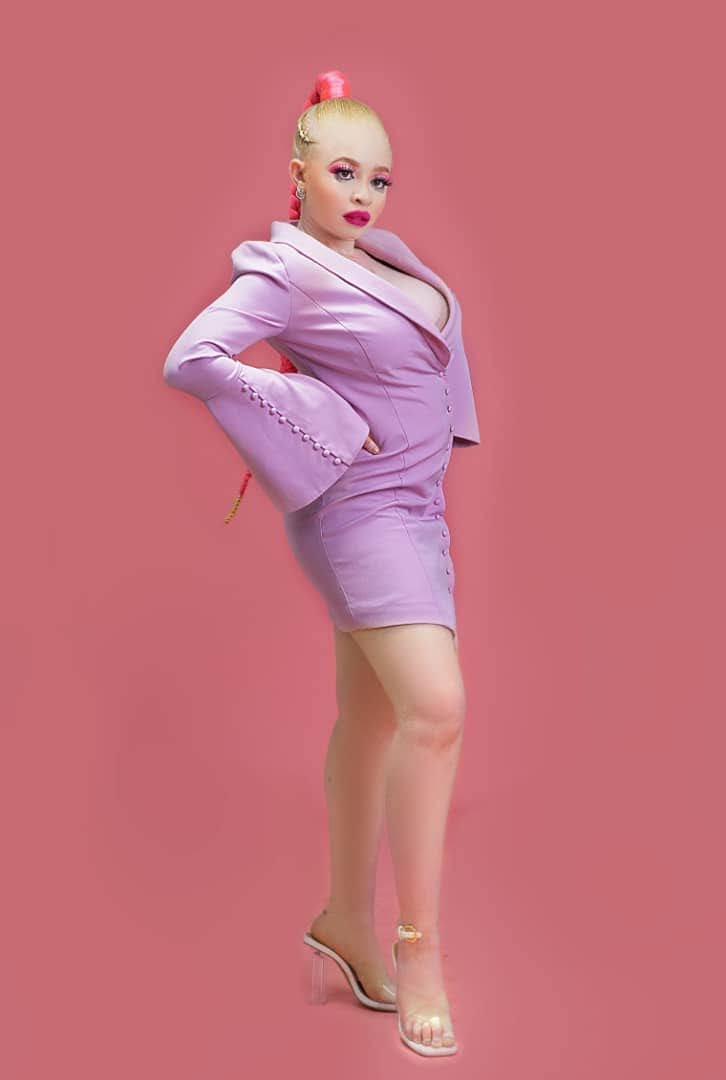
- Born: c 2000; Bulawayo, Zimbabwe
- Education: University of Zimbabwe
- Known for: Model with albinism
- Awards: Outstanding Female Model, Bulawayo Models Awards (2020); People’s Choice Young Achievers (2021); Outstanding Female Model at the Bulawayo Arts Awards (2022); Young Influencer of the Year at the Ignite Youth Awards (2022)

Ayanda Candice Sibanda (born c 2000) is a Zimbabwean beauty pageant titleholder, model and activist for those with albinism.

== Biography ==
Sibanda began modelling when she was in primary school in Bulawayo. Born with albinism, she found that modelling gave her confidence as well as a platform to advocate for others.

As a child, she faced discrimination from other children as well as from adults. Her experiences and the support of her parents encouraged her to take up modelling and activism. Sibanda describes her motivation as, "In life, never be defined by someone else’s belief of what is possible”.

Sibanda has used beauty pageants to raise awareness to the difficulties faced by people with albinism in African society. In 2019 she was named second runner up to Miss Teen Zimbabwe, as well as crowned Miss Albinism Zimbabwe. In 2020 she received the crown of Miss University of Zimbabwe and in 2022 she was crowned Miss Africa Zimbabwe. As of 2020, there are an estimated 70,000 people in Zimbabwe with albinism.

While at university, Sibanda started the Ayanda Candice Foundation to advocate for women's empowerment and for the rights of those with disabilities. The Foundation trains young women in leadership skills and with mentoring support. Through the Foundation, Sibanda speaks on topics related to albinism in Zimbabwean society. In 2021, she was a member of the European Union's Youth Sounding Board in Zimbabwe, sharing her experience with policymakers.

In 2024 Sibanda graduated from the University of Zimbabwe with a degree in law.

== See also ==
- John Makumbe, Zimbabwean activist for those with albinism
- Persecution of people with albinism
