= Tom Egeland =

Norwegian author (born 1959)

- Born: 8 July 1959 (age 67); Oslo, Norway
- Occupations: Author, novelist
- Writing career
- Genre: Fiction
- Notable awards: Riverton Prize 2009
- Website: www.tomegeland.com/en

Tom Egeland (born 8 July 1959 in Oslo) is a Norwegian author. His great-grandfather was Jon Flatabø from Kvam in Hardanger, one of the pioneer authors of popular literature in Norway. Egeland's novels are published in Norwegian and translated into 25 languages. His most famous novel is Sirkelens ende (Circle's End), published in English with the title Relic, which deals with several of the same topics as The Da Vinci Code. Egeland's book was published in 2001, two years before The Da Vinci Code.

European readers and critics quickly noted some striking similarities between the Da Vinci Code and Circle's End. Like The Da Vinci Code, Circle's End involves an ancient mystery and a worldwide conspiracy, the discovery that Jesus was married to Mary Magdalene, and an albino as one of the main characters. In both novels, the main female character is revealed to be the last living descendant of Christ and Mary Magdalene, and the daughter/granddaughter of the last grandmaster of a secret order.

Many European readers have speculated that Dan Brown had plagiarized Tom Egeland's book. Since the Norwegian novel had not yet been translated into English when The Da Vinci Code was first published, it is generally assumed now that the similarities between the two books, although striking, are coincidental.

The author himself, Tom Egeland, has been in numerous interviews in European media, and on his own website, dismissed the claim of Brown's novel plagiarizing his own novel, stating that the similarities just show that he and Brown more or less have done the same research and found the same sources.

Egeland's novel Guardians of the Covenant has been translated into 17 languages. Both Guardians of the Covenant and the 2001 bestseller Relic have been acquired by the British publishing house John Murray.

The thriller Night of the Wolf (2005) - about Chechen terrorists taking control of a live television debate show - as also been made into a feature-length movie and a television mini-series. Egeland wrote the script himself.

In 2007 Tom Egeland published two books: The Girl in the Mirror (for young adults) and Guardians of the Covenant, a thriller with the same main character as Relic: The albino archaeologist Bjørn Beltø.

Egeland's thriller The Gospel Of Lucifer was published in Norwegian in May 2009 and has been translated into 12 languages. The novel was awarded the Norwegian Riverton Prize for best crime novel 2009.

According to IMDB, he was an extra in The Empire Strikes Back, portraying one of the rebel soldiers fighting in the Battle of Hoth.

During the autumn of 2016, Egeland became the topic of controversy after he was banned by Facebook for publishing the famous war photograph of "the Napalm girl" Phan Thị Kim Phúc on his personal Facebook page. Facebook eventually reconsidered its opinion concerning this picture and republished it, recognizing "the history and global importance of this image in documenting a particular moment in time".

Egeland has been president of the Norwegian Crime Writers' Association (Rivertonklubben) since 2015 and has been a board member of the Norwegian Authors' Union (Den norske Forfatterforening) since 2010. He is a book critic for the Norwegian newspaper VG (Verdens Gang).

== Bibliography ==
- Stien mot fortiden (Path To The Past) (1988)
- Skyggelandet (Shadowland) (1993)
- Trollspeilet (Troll-Mirror) (1997)
- Sirkelens ende (Circle's End) (2001) Translated to English as Relic.
- Åndebrettet (Ouija Board) (2004)
- Ulvenatten (Wolf's Night) (2005)
- Piken i speilet (Girl In Mirror) (2007) A children's book.
- Paktens voktere (Covenant's Guardians) (2007)
- Lucifers Evangelium (Lucifer's Gospel) (2009)
- Fedrenes løgner (The Fathers' Lies) (2010)
- Nostradamus' testamente (Nostradamus's Testament) (2012)
- Katakombens hemmelighet (Catacomb's Secret) (2013) Young adult.
- Den 13. disippel (The 13th Disciple) (2014)
- Skatten fra Miklagard (Treasure From Miklagard) (2014) Young adult.
- Mumiens mysterium (Mummy's Mystery) (2015) Young adult.
- Den store spøkelsesboka (Great Ghost-Book) (2015) A children's book.
- Djevelmasken (Devil's Mask) (2016)
- Lasaruseffekten (The Lazarus Effect) (2017)
- Codex (Codex) (2018)
- Falken (Falcon) (2019)
- Kongen (The King) (2020)

== Awards and honors ==
2009 – Riverton Prize for "Lucifer's Gospel"

2013 – ARK Children's Book Prize for "The Secret of the Catacombs"

2016 – Norwegian Language Society's Literature Prize for "The Devil's Mask"
