= Griscelli syndrome type 2 =

- Other names: Hypopigmentation-immunodeficiency with or without neurologic impairment syndrome
- This condition is inherited in an autosomal recessive manner

Griscelli syndrome type 2 (also known as "partial albinism with immunodeficiency") is a rare autosomal recessive syndrome characterized by variable cutenous albinism, silver colored metallic looking hair, frequent bacterial or viral infections, neutropenia, and thrombocytopenia.

== Presentation ==
All types of Griscelli syndrome have distinctive skin and hair coloring.

Type 1 is associated with neurological abnormalities. These include delayed development, intellectual disability, seizures, hypotonia and eye abnormalities.

Type 2 - unlike type 1 - is not associated with primary neurological disease but is associated with an uncontrolled T lymphocyte expansion and macrophage activation syndrome. It is often associated with the hemophagocytic syndrome. This latter condition may be fatal in the absence of bone marrow transplantation.

Persons with type 3 have the typical light skin and hair coloring but are otherwise normal.

== Genetics ==
There are three types of Griscelli syndrome.

Type 1 is associated with mutations in the MYO5A gene

Type 2 is associated with mutations in RAB27A gene.

Both these genes are located on the long arm of chromosome 15 (15q21).

Type 3 is associated with mutations in the MLPH gene.

All types are inherited in an autosomal recessive fashion.

== Diagnosis ==
=== Differential diagnosis ===
This includes Chediak-Higashi syndrome and Elejalde syndrome (neuroectodermal melanolysosomal disease).

== History ==
This syndrome was first described in 1978. In 2000 types 1 and 2 were distinguished.

== See also ==
- Griscelli syndrome
