= Griscelli syndrome =

- Other names: Partial albinism-immunodeficiency syndrome, Griscelli-Pruniéras syndrome, Chédiak-Higashi-like syndrome
- Griscelli syndrome has an autosomal recessive pattern of inheritance.
- Specialty: Pediatrics
- Frequency: 0.0001%

Griscelli syndrome is a rare autosomal recessive disorder characterized by albinism (hypopigmentation) with immunodeficiency, that usually causes death by early childhood. Researchers have developed three different classifications of the form of disorder, characterised by different signs and symptoms. Type 1 Griscelli syndrome is associated with severe brain function issues along with distinctive discolouring of the hair and skin. Type 2 Griscelli syndrome have immune system abnormalities in addition to hypopigmentation of skin and hair. Finally, type 3 is seen as those only affected by hypopigmentation of the skin and hair. This type is not associated with immune deficiencies or neurological abnormalities.

== Signs and symptoms ==
Griscelli syndrome is defined by the characteristic hypopigmentation, with frequent pyogenic infection, enlargement of the liver and spleen, a low blood neutrophil level, low blood platelet level, and immunodeficiency. Very often there is also impaired natural killer cell activity, absent delayed-type hypersensitivity and a poor cell proliferation response to antigenic challenge. This may be caused by the loss of three different genes, each of which has different additional effects, resulting in three types of syndrome. Its inheritance is autosomal recessive.

Examination of the hair in this syndrome may be useful. Under light microscopy, these hairs exhibit bigger and irregular melanin granules, distributed mainly near the medulla. Under polarized light microscopy, the hairs appear monotonously white.

There are three main types of Grescelli syndrome: type 1, type 2, and type 3. Regardless of type, people with Griscelli syndrome have hypopigmented skin and light, silvery-gray hair. People with Griscelli syndrome type 1 have severe problems concerning brain function, typically characterized as delayed development, intellectual disability, seizures, hypotonia, and eye and vision abnormalities. People with Griscelli syndrome type 2 have immune system abnormalities and are susceptible to recurrent infections; they develop hemophagocytic lymphohistiocytosis, which may damage organs and body tissues. People with Griscelli syndrome type 3 only have the baseline light skin and hair coloring abnormalities.

== Pathophysiology ==
In melanocytes, melanosomes (vesicles containing the pigment melanin) are transported on microtubules. They are then bound by Rab27A which recruits Slac2-a and myosin Va. This complex then transfers the melanosomes from the microtubules to actin filaments. This transfer is necessary for the transport of melanosomes from the perinuclear area to the cell periphery. The loss of any one of these proteins interrupts melanosome transport and results in the hypopigmentation.

However, these three proteins do not work together in other cells and RAB27A effectors may be 'mix and match.' For example, the knockout of Rab27 causes the hypopigmentation but also immunodeficiency due to deficiencies in cytotoxic killing activity in cytotoxic T cells (something that also depends on vesicle transport). While, the knockout of myosin Va does not cause immunodeficiency, but it does cause neural defects. Though some neural problems (i.e. brain damage) can be seen in Rab27A deficient children, this is thought to be a secondary effect of the immune problems, and not directly due to the lack of Rab27A. Munc13-4 has also drawn attention based on its involvement in causing bleeding manifestations in Griscelli syndrome. Munc13-4 through its interactions with Rab27a appears to be important for the dense granule release from platelets. The mutated Rab27a interaction with Munc13-4 is the cause of bleeding in type 2 Griscelli syndrome.

== Diagnosis ==
=== Types ===
Griscelli syndrome is a disorder of melanosome transport, and divided into several types:

OMIM	Name	Gene
214450	Griscelli syndrome type 1 (Elejalde syndrome)	MYO5A
607624	Griscelli syndrome type 2 (Partial albinism with immunodeficiency)	RAB27A
609227	Griscelli syndrome type 3	MLPH

== Management ==
Management and treatment is depended upon the type of syndrome one is diagnosed as having. Prognosis for long-term survival is however, relatively poor. Type 2 is usually rapidly fatal within 1 to 4 years without immediate, accelerated treatment. Chemotherapy have achieved remissions however is sometimes ineffective for the treatment of the primary disease and can fail to control relapses. Allogenic bone-marrow transplantation (BMT) is the only known curative treatment in this disease. The severe neurological impairment and delayed development of the human does not improve with time. During the accelerated phase, immunosuppressives can be used to control signs and symptoms. Since its discovery in 1976, only 40 citations have been found in modern literature. In order to treat patients, the aggressive therapy strategy approach must always be taken for acute bacterial infections and prophylactic antibiotics. This assists in minimising possible effects and prolonging life expectancy.

== Eponym ==
It is named after Claude Griscelli, professor of pediatrics at Hôpital Necker Enfants-Malades in Paris (France).

== See also ==
- Chédiak–Higashi syndrome
