= RAP1GAP2 =

Protein-coding gene in the species Homo sapiens

Identifiers
- Aliases: RAP1GAP2, GARNL4, RAP1GA3, RAP1 GTPase activating protein 2
- External IDs: MGI: 3028623; HomoloGene: 56695; GeneCards: RAP1GAP2; OMA:RAP1GAP2 - orthologs

Gene location (Human)
Chr.	Chromosome 17 (human)
Band	17p13.3	Start	2,755,705 bp
Band	17p13.3	End	3,037,741 bp

Gene location (Mouse)
Chr.	Chromosome 11 (mouse)
Band	11|11 B5	Start	74,274,182 bp
Band	11|11 B5	End	74,501,741 bp
RNA expression pattern
Bgee	Human / Mouse (ortholog); Top expressed in: Brodmann area 23; middle temporal gyrus; endothelial cell; superior frontal gyrus; right hemisphere of cerebellum; islet of Langerhans; postcentral gyrus; cerebellar vermis; entorhinal cortex; beta cell / Top expressed in: islet of Langerhans; primary motor cortex; medial vestibular nucleus; submandibular gland; prefrontal cortex; deep cerebellar nuclei; cingulate gyrus; pontine nuclei; dentate gyrus of hippocampal formation granule cell; epithelium of stomach; More reference expression data
BioGPS	n/a
Gene ontology
Molecular function	protein binding; GTPase activator activity
Cellular component	perinuclear region of cytoplasm; neuron projection; centrosome; plasma membrane; nuclear membrane; cytoplasm; cytosol
Biological process	regulation of cell size; positive regulation of GTPase activity; negative regulation of neuron projection development; regulation of small GTPase mediated signal transduction
Sources:Amigo / QuickGO
Orthologs
Species	Human	Mouse
Entrez	23108	380711
Ensembl	ENSG00000132359	ENSMUSG00000038807
UniProt	Q684P5	Q5SVL6
RefSeq (mRNA)	NM_001100398; NM_015085; NM_001330058	NM_001015046; NM_001364131; NM_001364132
RefSeq (protein)	NP_001093868; NP_001316987; NP_055900	NP_001015046; NP_001351060; NP_001351061; NP_001388587
Location (UCSC)	Chr 17: 2.76 – 3.04 Mb	Chr 11: 74.27 – 74.5 Mb
PubMed search
- Wikidata
View/Edit Human	View/Edit Mouse

RAP1 GTPase activating protein 2 is a protein in humans that is encoded by the RAP1GAP2 gene.

This gene encodes a GTPase-activating protein that activates the small guanine-nucleotide-binding protein Rap1 in platelets. The protein interacts with synaptotagmin-like protein 1 and Rab27 and regulates secretion of dense granules from platelets at sites of endothelial damage. Multiple transcript variants encoding different isoforms have been found for this gene. [provided by RefSeq, Sep 2009].
