= Elejalde syndrome =

- Other names: Griscelli syndrome type 1, Acrocephalopolydactyly
- Elejalde syndrome is inherited in an autosomal recessive manner
- Specialty: Medical genetics

Elejalde syndrome or neuroectodermal melanolysosomal disease is an extremely rare autosomal recessive syndrome (only around 10 cases known) consisting of moderate pigment dilution, profound central nervous system dysfunction, no immune defects, and hair with a metallic silvery sheen. The changes to hair and skin pigmentation are associated with altered melanosome trafficking.

It is associated with MYO5A.

== See also ==
- Griscelli syndrome
