= RAB27 =

Protein family

RAB27A, member RAS oncogene family

Identifiers
- Symbol: RAB27A
- NCBI gene: 5873
- HGNC: 9766
- OMIM: 603868
- RefSeq: NM_004580
- UniProt: P51159

Other data
- Locus: Chr. 15 q21
Search for
- Structures: Swiss-model
- Domains: InterPro

RAB27B, member RAS oncogene family

Identifiers
- Symbol: RAB27B
- NCBI gene: 5874
- HGNC: 9767
- OMIM: 603869
- RefSeq: NM_004163
- UniProt: O00194

Other data
- Locus: Chr. 18 q21.2
Search for
- Structures: Swiss-model
- Domains: InterPro

Rab27 is a member of the Rab subfamily of GTPases. Rab27 is post-translationally modified by the addition of two geranylgeranyl groups on the two C-terminal cysteines.

== Isoforms ==
Rab27 has two main isoforms: Rab27a and Rab27b. These are similar in primary composition, with 66% similarity between nucleotides. Most of their differences originate from their C-terminal, which is responsible for interactions with proteins such as SPIREs. Thus, these isoforms play different roles in the regulation pathway of exocytosis. Throughout the process of exocytosis, Rab27a and Rab27b are found in different sections of the cell, with Rab27b found commonly in the TGN and Rab27a usually bound to multivesicular endosomes with CD63 present.

== Function ==
Rab27 plays a key role in the regulation of exocytosis of vesicles in various cellular organelles. In certain secretory organelles, such as Weibel-Palade bodies in endothelial cells, Rab27a is recruited during organelle maturation, rendering them from a secretion-incompetent to a secretion-comptetent state. Rab27 uses effectors to tether vesicles to the cytoskeleton and transport them to the plasma membrane, where they undergo fusion. They ensure that vesicles attach correctly, in the proper orientation, at the dedicated site of fusion. However, fusion itself is started when effectors bind SNARE proteins that catalyze the start of exocytosis.

== Clinical significance ==
=== Mutations ===
Mutations that prevent the expression of Rab27 ('knock out' mutations) cause the hypopigmentation and immunodeficiency disorder known as type II Griscelli syndrome, while a decrease in Rab27 prenylation is thought to be involved in choroideremia.

The symptoms of type II Griscelli syndrome have shown that Rab27 is involved in melanosome transport in melanocytes and in cytotoxic killing activity in cytotoxic T lymphoblasts. In melanocytes Rab27 binds the melanosome. The melanosome is transported along the microtubule. Rab27 then recruits Slac2A and myosin Va, these enzymes are essential for the transfer of the melanosomes from the microtubules to actin filaments. The melanosomes can now continue on their path towards the cell periphery. If either Rab27, Slac2A or myosin Va are absent then the melanosomes remain in the perinuclear region of the cell. This disruption in pigmentation results in the hypopigmentation seen in the silvery hair colour of patients with Griscelli syndrome.

=== Cancer ===
The Rab27a isoform might play a role in cancer. It contributes to the growth of cancerous tumors due to its promotion of chemokine and metalloproteinase secretions. Because of the over-expression of Rab27a in tissues in the breasts, lungs, and pancreas, there may be a linkage between Rab27a presence and likelihood of cancer. Additionally, the release of metalloproteinases results in the breakdown of the ECM, which releases many of the growth factors held within.
