= Melanophilin =

Protein-coding gene in the species Homo sapiens

MLPH

Identifiers
- Aliases: MLPH, SLAC2-A, melanophilin
- External IDs: OMIM: 606526; MGI: 2176380; GeneCards: MLPH

Gene location (Human)
Chr.	Chromosome 2 (human)
Band	2q37.3	Start	237,485,428 bp
Band	2q37.3	End	237,555,322 bp

Gene location (Mouse)
Chr.	Chromosome 1 (mouse)
Band	1 D|1 45.73 cM	Start	90,842,807 bp
Band	1 D|1 45.73 cM	End	90,878,864 bp
RNA expression pattern
Bgee	Human / Mouse (ortholog); Top expressed in: pancreatic ductal cell; parotid gland; right uterine tube; canal of the cervix; right lung; olfactory zone of nasal mucosa; minor salivary glands; nasal epithelium; apex of heart; prostate / Top expressed in: pyloric antrum; lacrimal gland; epithelium of stomach; mucous cell of stomach; salivary gland; submandibular gland; parotid gland; iris; decidua; Ileal epithelium; More reference expression data
BioGPS	n/a
Gene ontology
Molecular function	protein binding; metal ion binding; actin binding; myosin binding; protein-macromolecule adaptor activity
Cellular component	cytoplasm; perinuclear region of cytoplasm; dendrite; extracellular exosome; cortical actin cytoskeleton
Biological process	intracellular protein transport; vesicle transport along actin filament; melanosome transport
Sources:Amigo / QuickGO
Orthologs
Databases	NCBI: entry; OMA: entry
Species	Human	Mouse
Entrez	79083	171531
Ensembl	ENSG00000115648	ENSMUSG00000026303
UniProt	Q9BV36	Q91V27
RefSeq (mRNA)	NM_001042467; NM_001281473; NM_001281474; NM_024101	NM_053015
RefSeq (protein)	NP_001035932; NP_001268402; NP_001268403; NP_077006	NP_443748
Location (UCSC)	Chr 2: 237.49 – 237.56 Mb	Chr 1: 90.84 – 90.88 Mb
PubMed search
- Wikidata
View/Edit Human	View/Edit Mouse

Melanophilin is a carrier protein which in humans is encoded by the MLPH gene. Several alternatively spliced transcript variants of this gene have been described, but the full-length nature of some of these variants has not been determined.

== Function ==
This gene encodes a member of the exophilin subfamily of Rab effector proteins. The protein forms a ternary complex with the small Ras-related GTPase Rab27A in its GTP-bound form and the motor protein myosin Va. A similar protein complex in mouse functions to tether pigment-producing organelles called melanosomes to the actin cytoskeleton in melanocytes, and is required for visible pigmentation in the hair and skin.

In melanocytic cells MLPH gene expression may be regulated by MITF.

== Clinical significance ==
A mutation in this gene results in Griscelli syndrome type 3, which is characterized by a silver-gray hair color and abnormal pigment distribution in the hair shaft.

Mutations in melanophilin cause the "dilute" coat color phenotype in dogs and cats. Variation in this gene appears to have been a target for recent natural selection in humans, and it has been hypothesized that this is due to a role in human pigmentation.
