= Lysosomal trafficking regulator =

Protein found in humans

LYST

Identifiers
- Aliases: LYST, lysosomal trafficking regulator, CHS, CHS1, Mauve
- External IDs: OMIM: 606897; MGI: 107448; GeneCards: LYST

Gene location (Human)
Chr.	Chromosome 1 (human)
Band	1q42.3	Start	235,661,041 bp
Band	1q42.3	End	235,883,640 bp

Gene location (Mouse)
Chr.	Chromosome 13 (mouse)
Band	13 A1|13 5.28 cM	Start	13,764,982 bp
Band	13 A1|13 5.28 cM	End	13,953,388 bp
RNA expression pattern
Bgee	Human / Mouse (ortholog); Top expressed in: monocyte; nipple; trabecular bone; bone marrow; blood; pylorus; bone marrow cell; skin of thigh; cardia; Achilles tendon / Top expressed in: granulocyte; tibiofemoral joint; lumbar spinal ganglion; mesenteric lymph nodes; facial motor nucleus; iris; dentate gyrus of hippocampal formation granule cell; blood; secondary oocyte; stroma of bone marrow; More reference expression data
BioGPS	n/a
Gene ontology
Molecular function	protein binding
Cellular component	cytoplasm; microtubule cytoskeleton
Biological process	protein transport; pigmentation; melanosome organization; endosome to lysosome transport via multivesicular body sorting pathway; lysosome organization; defense response to bacterium; defense response to virus; leukocyte chemotaxis; natural killer cell mediated cytotoxicity; mast cell secretory granule organization; defense response to protozoan
Sources:Amigo / QuickGO
Orthologs
Databases	NCBI: entry; OMA: entry
Species	Human	Mouse
Entrez	1130	17101
Ensembl	ENSG00000143669	ENSMUSG00000019726
UniProt	Q99698	P97412
RefSeq (mRNA)	NM_000081; NM_001005736; NM_001301365	NM_010748
RefSeq (protein)	NP_000072; NP_001288294	NP_034878
Location (UCSC)	Chr 1: 235.66 – 235.88 Mb	Chr 13: 13.76 – 13.95 Mb
PubMed search
- Wikidata
View/Edit Human	View/Edit Mouse

lysosomal trafficking regulator

Identifiers
- Symbol: LYST
- Alt. symbols: CHS1
- NCBI gene: 1130
- HGNC: 1968
- OMIM: 606897
- RefSeq: NM_000081
- UniProt: Q99698

Other data
- Locus: Chr. 1 q42.1-42.2
Search for
- Structures: Swiss-model
- Domains: InterPro

Lysosomal trafficking regulator is a vesicular transport protein associated with Chédiak–Higashi syndrome.

In melanocytic cells LYST gene expression may be regulated by MITF.
