= SYTL2 =

Protein-coding gene in the species Homo sapiens

Identifiers
- Aliases: SYTL2, CHR11SYT, EXO4, PPP1R151, SGA72M, SLP2, SLP2A, synaptotagmin like 2
- External IDs: OMIM: 612880; MGI: 1933366; GeneCards: SYTL2
Available structures
PDB	Ortholog search: PDBe RCSB
PDB	List of PDB id codes 3BC1

Gene location (Human)
Chr.	Chromosome 11 (human)
Band	11q14.1	Start	85,694,224 bp
Band	11q14.1	End	85,811,159 bp

Gene location (Mouse)
Chr.	Chromosome 7 (mouse)
Band	7|7 E1	Start	89,951,460 bp
Band	7|7 E1	End	90,059,927 bp
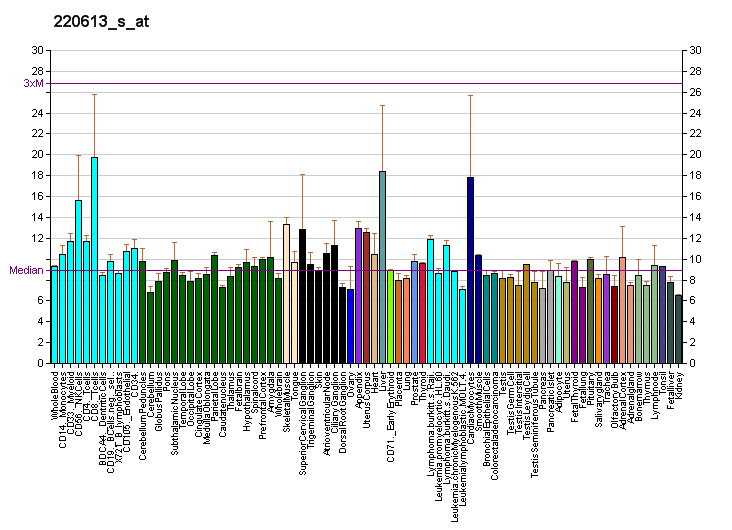
RNA expression pattern
Bgee	Human / Mouse (ortholog); Top expressed in: saphenous vein; rectum; mucosa of sigmoid colon; bronchial epithelial cell; endothelial cell; urethra; vena cava; right coronary artery; tibial arteries; mucosa of transverse colon / Top expressed in: iris; epithelium of stomach; pyloric antrum; transitional epithelium of urinary bladder; motor neuron; mucous cell of stomach; facial motor nucleus; zygote; hair follicle; secondary oocyte; More reference expression data
BioGPS	More reference expression data
Gene ontology
Molecular function	calcium ion binding; phosphatase binding; clathrin binding; phosphatidylserine binding; neurexin family protein binding; protein binding; calcium-dependent phospholipid binding; phosphatidylinositol-4,5-bisphosphate binding; syntaxin binding
Cellular component	cytoplasm; exocytic vesicle; membrane; melanosome; plasma membrane; extrinsic component of plasma membrane; synapse; presynapse
Biological process	negative regulation of phosphatase activity; vesicle docking involved in exocytosis; protein localization to plasma membrane; intracellular protein transport; positive regulation of mucus secretion; vesicle-mediated transport; exocytosis; regulation of calcium ion-dependent exocytosis; calcium ion-regulated exocytosis of neurotransmitter; vesicle fusion
Sources:Amigo / QuickGO
Orthologs
Databases	NCBI: entry; OMA: entry
Species	Human	Mouse
Entrez	54843	83671
Ensembl	ENSG00000137501	ENSMUSG00000030616
UniProt	Q9HCH5	Q99N50
RefSeq (mRNA)	NM_001162951; NM_001162952; NM_001162953; NM_001289608; NM_001289609 NM_001289610; NM_032379; NM_032943; NM_206927; NM_206928; NM_206929; NM_206930; NM_001365826; NM_001365827; NM_001365828; NM_001365829; NM_001365830; NM_001365831; NM_001365832; NM_001365833; NM_001365834; NM_001365835	NM_001040085; NM_001040086; NM_001040087; NM_001040088; NM_001289583 NM_001289584; NM_001289585; NM_001289586; NM_031394; NM_001368878
RefSeq (protein)	NP_001156423; NP_001156424; NP_001156425; NP_001276537; NP_001276538 NP_001276539; NP_116561; NP_996812; NP_996813; NP_001352755; NP_001352756; NP_001352757; NP_001352758; NP_001352759; NP_001352760; NP_001352761; NP_001352762; NP_001352763; NP_001352764; NP_996810; NP_996811	NP_001035174; NP_001035176; NP_001035177; NP_001276512; NP_001276513 NP_001276514; NP_001276515; NP_113571; NP_001355807
Location (UCSC)	Chr 11: 85.69 – 85.81 Mb	Chr 7: 89.95 – 90.06 Mb
PubMed search
- Wikidata
View/Edit Human	View/Edit Mouse

Synaptotagmin-like 2, also known as SYTL2, is a human gene.

== Function ==
The protein encoded by this gene is a synaptotagmin-like protein (SLP) that belongs to a C2 domain-containing protein family. The SLP homology domain (SHD) of this protein has been shown to specifically bind the GTP-bound form of Ras-related protein Rab-27A (RAB27A), which suggests a role in vesicle trafficking. Multiple alternatively spiced transcript variants encoding distinct isoforms have been observed.

== Interactions ==
SYTL2 has been shown to interact with RAB27A.
