= RPH3AL =

Protein-coding gene in the species Homo sapiens

Identifiers
- Aliases: RPH3AL, NOC2, rabphilin 3A-like (without C2 domains), rabphilin 3A like (without C2 domains)
- External IDs: OMIM: 604881; MGI: 1923492; HomoloGene: 5078; GeneCards: RPH3AL; OMA:RPH3AL - orthologs

Gene location (Human)
Chr.	Chromosome 17 (human)
Band	17p13.3	Start	212,389 bp
Band	17p13.3	End	386,254 bp

Gene location (Mouse)
Chr.	Chromosome 11 (mouse)
Band	11|11 B5	Start	75,721,825 bp
Band	11|11 B5	End	75,829,255 bp
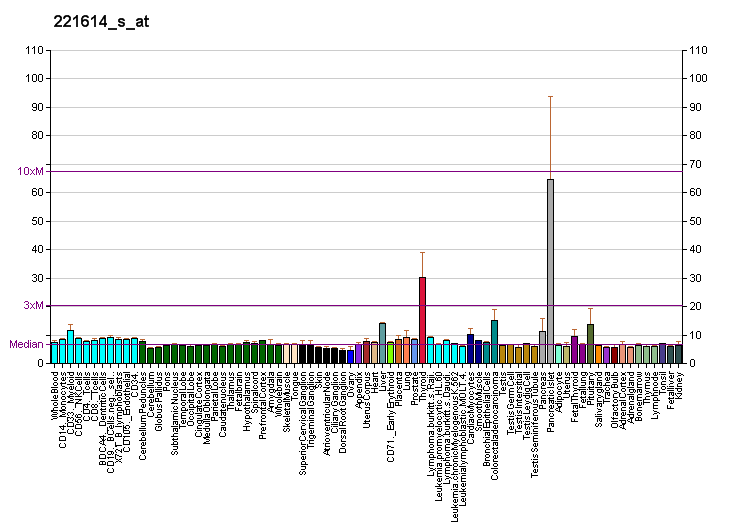
RNA expression pattern
Bgee	Human / Mouse (ortholog); Top expressed in: body of pancreas; anterior pituitary; islet of Langerhans; right adrenal gland; left adrenal cortex; sural nerve; right adrenal cortex; right lobe of liver; gonad; right lobe of thyroid gland / Top expressed in: primary oocyte; islet of Langerhans; zygote; epithelium of stomach; secondary oocyte; otolith organ; utricle; pituitary gland; Paneth cell; external carotid artery; More reference expression data
BioGPS	More reference expression data
Gene ontology
Molecular function	calcium ion binding; metal ion binding; cytoskeletal protein binding; protein binding; calcium-dependent phospholipid binding; LIM domain binding
Cellular component	cytoplasm; secretory granule membrane; membrane; transport vesicle membrane; secretory granule; cytoplasmic vesicle; plasma membrane; intracellular anatomical structure
Biological process	glucose homeostasis; regulation of exocytosis; positive regulation of protein secretion; intracellular protein transport; negative regulation of G protein-coupled receptor signaling pathway; exocytosis; regulation of calcium ion-dependent exocytosis; positive regulation of insulin secretion
Sources:Amigo / QuickGO
Orthologs
Species	Human	Mouse
Entrez	9501	380714
Ensembl	ENSG00000181031; ENSG00000262334; ENSG00000282013	ENSMUSG00000020847
UniProt	Q9UNE2	Q768S4
RefSeq (mRNA)	NM_001190411; NM_001190412; NM_001190413; NM_006987	NM_001291159; NM_029548
RefSeq (protein)	NP_001177340; NP_001177341; NP_001177342; NP_008918	NP_001278088; NP_083824
Location (UCSC)	Chr 17: 0.21 – 0.39 Mb	Chr 11: 75.72 – 75.83 Mb
PubMed search
- Wikidata
View/Edit Human	View/Edit Mouse

Rab effector Noc2 is a protein that in humans is encoded by the RPH3AL gene.

== Interactions ==
RPH3AL has been shown to interact with RAB27A.
