= Neutrophil =

Type of white blood cell

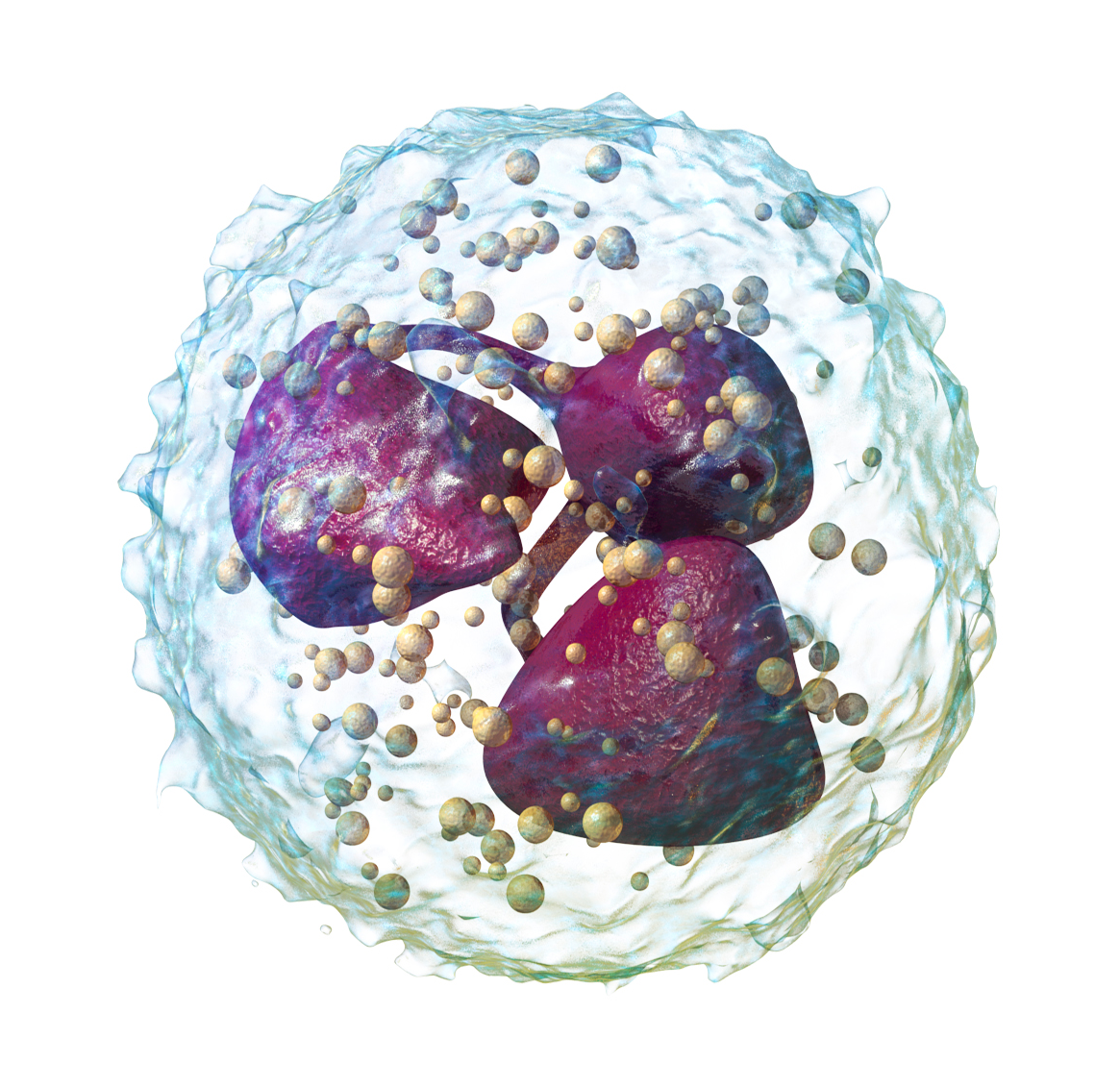
- 3D rendering of a neutrophil

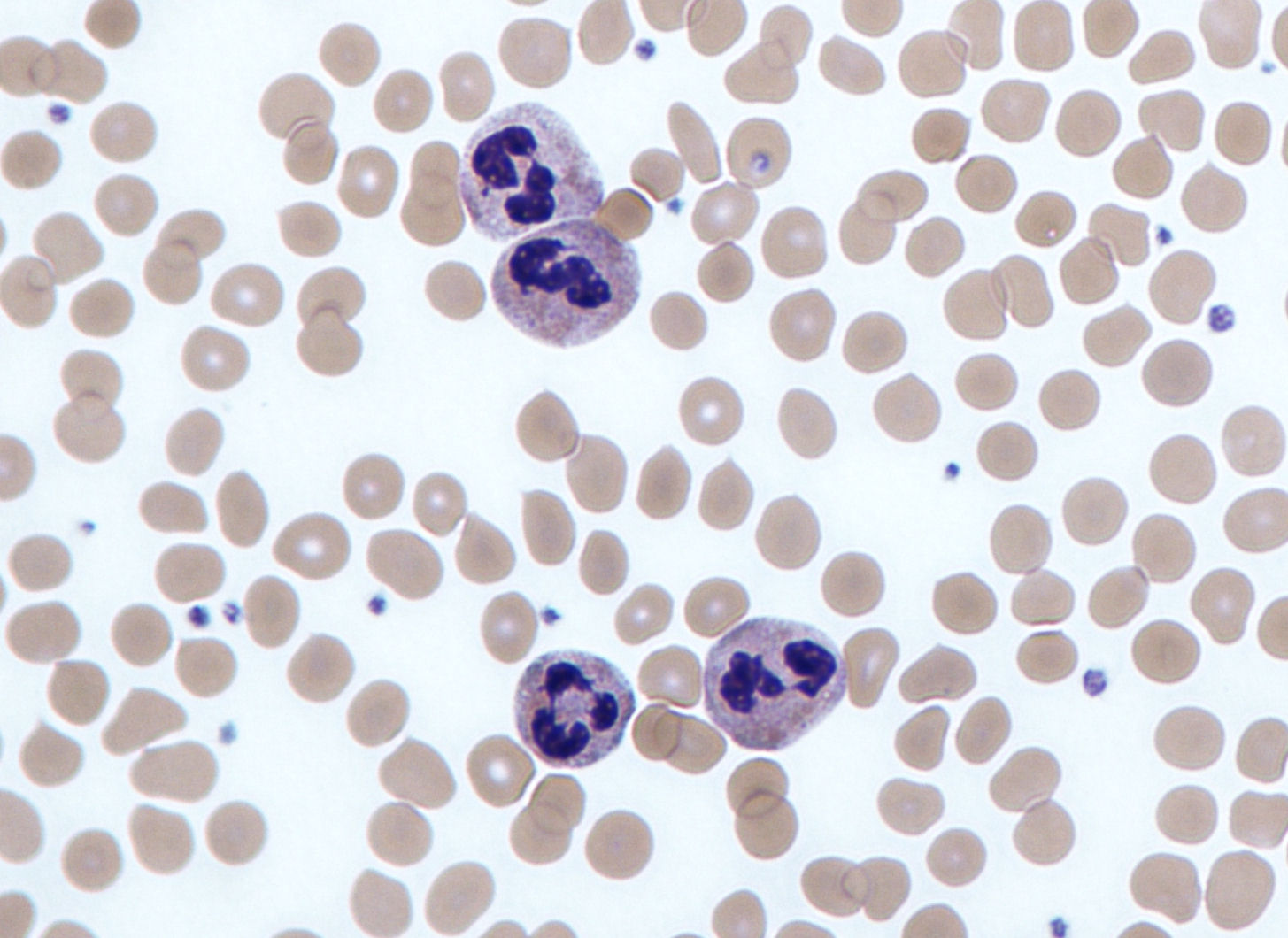
- Neutrophils with segmented nuclei surrounded by erythrocytes and platelets. Intra-cellular granules are visible in the cytoplasm (Giemsa stained).

Details
- System: Immune system
- Function: Phagocytosis

Identifiers
- MeSH: D009504
- TH: H2.00.04.1.02012
- FMA: 62860

Neutrophils are a type of phagocytic white blood cell and part of innate immunity. More specifically, they form the most abundant type of granulocytes and make up 40% to 70% of all white blood cells in humans. Their functions vary in different animals. In humans they participate in processes such as sterile inflammation, tissue repair, and cancer, and exhibit coordinated collective behavior. They are also known as neutrocytes, heterophils or polymorphonuclear leukocytes.

They are formed from stem cells in the bone marrow and differentiated into subpopulations of neutrophil-killers and neutrophil-cagers. They are short-lived (between 5 and 135 hours) and highly mobile, as they can enter parts of tissue where other cells/molecules cannot. Neutrophils may be subdivided into segmented neutrophils and banded neutrophils (or bands). They form part of the polymorphonuclear cells family (PMNs) together with basophils and eosinophils.

The name neutrophil derives from staining characteristics on hematoxylin and eosin (H&E) histological or cytological preparations. Whereas basophilic white blood cells stain dark blue and eosinophilic white blood cells stain bright red, neutrophils stain a neutral pink. Normally, neutrophils contain a nucleus divided into 2–5 lobes.

Neutrophils are a type of phagocyte and are normally found in the bloodstream. During the beginning (acute) phase of inflammation, particularly as a result of bacterial infection, environmental exposure, and some cancers, neutrophils are one of the first responders of inflammatory cells to migrate toward the site of inflammation. They migrate through the blood vessels and then through interstitial space, following chemical signals such as interleukin-8 (IL-8), C5a, fMLP, leukotriene B4, and hydrogen peroxide (H_{2}O_{2}) in a process called chemotaxis. They are the predominant cells in pus, accounting for its whitish-to-yellowish appearance.

Neutrophils are recruited to the site of injury within minutes following trauma and are the hallmark of acute inflammation. They not only play a central role in combating infection but also contribute to pain in the acute period by releasing pro-inflammatory cytokines and other mediators that sensitize nociceptors, leading to heightened pain perception. However, due to some pathogens being indigestible, they may not be able to resolve certain infections without the assistance of other types of immune cells.

== Structure ==
Neutrophil granulocyte migrates from the blood vessel to the matrix, secreting proteolytic enzymes to dissolve intercellular connections (to the improvement of its mobility) and envelop bacteria through phagocytosis.

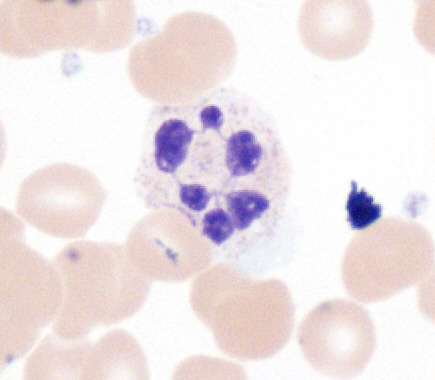
Hypersegmented neutrophil

When adhered to a surface, neutrophil granulocytes have an average diameter of 12–15 micrometers (μm) in peripheral blood smears. In suspension, human neutrophils have an average diameter of 8.85 μm.

With the eosinophil and the basophil, they form the class of polymorphonuclear cells, named for the nucleus's multilobulated shape (as compared to lymphocytes and monocytes, the other types of white cells). The nucleus has a characteristic lobed appearance, the separate lobes connected by chromatin. The nucleolus disappears as the neutrophil matures, which is something that happens in only a few other types of nucleated cells. Up to 17% of female human neutrophil nuclei have a drumstick-shaped appendage which contains the inactivated X chromosome. In the cytoplasm, the Golgi apparatus is small, mitochondria and ribosomes are sparse, and the rough endoplasmic reticulum is absent. The cytoplasm also contains about 200 granules, of which a third are azurophilic.

Neutrophils will show increasing segmentation (many segments of the nucleus) as they mature. A normal neutrophil should have 3–5 segments. Hypersegmentation is not normal but occurs in some disorders, most notably vitamin B_{12} deficiency. This is noted in a manual review of the blood smear and is positive when most or all of the neutrophils have 5 or more segments.

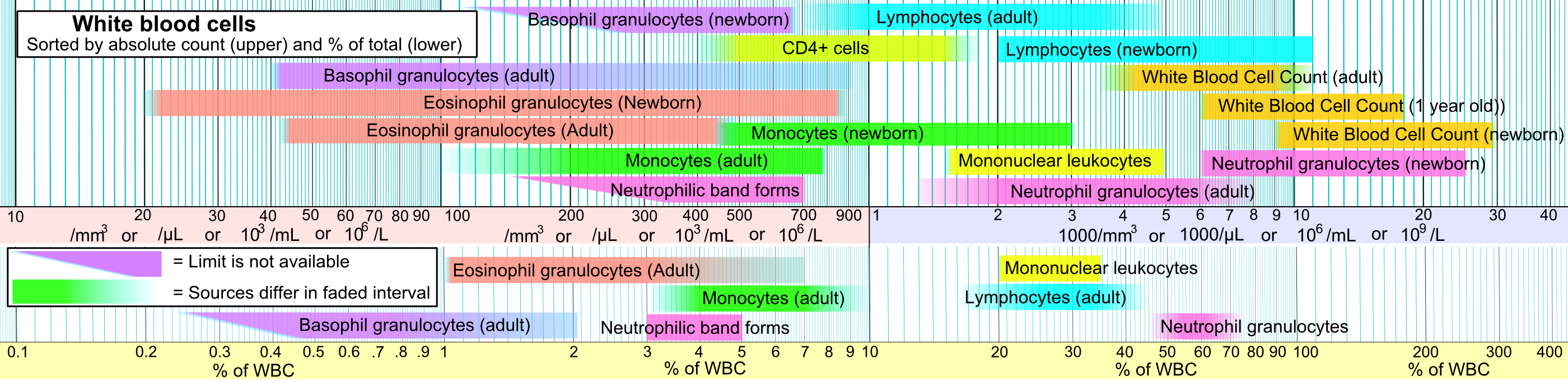
Reference ranges for blood tests of white blood cells, comparing neutrophil amount (shown in pink) with that of other cells

Neutrophils are the most abundant white blood cells in the human body (approximately 10^{11} are produced daily); they account for approximately 50–70% of all white blood cells (leukocytes). The stated normal range for human blood counts varies between laboratories, but a neutrophil count of 2.5–7.5 × 10^{9}/L is a standard normal range. People of African and Middle Eastern descent may have lower counts, which are still normal. A report may divide neutrophils into segmented neutrophils and bands. When circulating in the bloodstream and inactivated, neutrophils are spherical. Once activated, they change shape and become more amorphous or amoeba-like and can extend pseudopods as they hunt for antigens.

== Reaction to sugars ==
The capacity of neutrophils to engulf bacteria is reduced when simple sugars like glucose, fructose as well as sucrose, honey and orange juice were ingested, while the ingestion of starches had no effect. Fasting, on the other hand, strengthened the neutrophils' phagocytic capacity to engulf bacteria. It was concluded that the function, and not the number, of phagocytes in engulfing bacteria was altered by the ingestion of sugars. In 2007 researchers at the Whitehead Institute of Biomedical Research found that given a selection of sugars on microbial surfaces, the neutrophils reacted to some types of sugars preferentially. The neutrophils preferentially engulfed and killed beta-1,6-glucan targets compared to beta-1,3-glucan targets.

== Development ==
=== Life span ===
HSC=hematopoietic stem cell, Progenitor=progenitor cell, L-blast=lymphoblast, lymphocyte, Mo-blast=monoblast, monocyte, myeloblast, Pro-M=promyelocyte, myelocyte, Meta-M=metamyelocyte, neutrophil, eosinophil, basophil, Pro-E=proerythroblast, Baso-E=basophilic erythroblast, poly-e=polychromatic erythroblast, ortho-E=orthochromatic erythroblast, erythrocyte, promegakaryocyte, megakaryocyte, platelet

The average lifespan of inactivated human neutrophils in the circulation has been reported by different approaches to be between 5 and 135 hours.

Upon activation, they marginate (position themselves adjacent to the blood vessel endothelium) and undergo selectin-dependent capture followed by integrin-dependent adhesion in most cases, after which they migrate into tissues, where they survive for 1–2 days. Neutrophils have also been demonstrated to be released into the blood from a splenic reserve following myocardial infarction.

The distribution ratio of neutrophils in bone marrow, blood and connective tissue is 28:1:25.

Neutrophils are much more numerous than the longer-lived monocyte/macrophage phagocytes. A pathogen (disease-causing microorganism or virus) is likely to first encounter a neutrophil. Some experts hypothesize that the short lifetime of neutrophils is an evolutionary adaptation. The short lifetime of neutrophils minimizes propagation of those pathogens that parasitize phagocytes (e.g. Leishmania) because the more time such parasites spend outside a host cell, the more likely they will be destroyed by some component of the body's defenses. Also, because neutrophil antimicrobial products can also damage host tissues, their short life limits damage to the host during inflammation.

Neutrophils will be removed after phagocytosis of pathogens by macrophages. PECAM-1 and phosphatidylserine on the cell surface are involved in this process.

== Function ==
=== Chemotaxis ===
Micrograph of neutrophil margination towards the edges of a capillary, with adhesion to the endothelium. H&E stain.

Neutrophils undergo a process called chemotaxis via amoeboid movement, which allows them to migrate toward sites of infection or inflammation. Cell surface receptors allow neutrophils to detect chemical gradients of molecules such as interleukin-8 (IL-8), interferon gamma (IFN-γ), C3a, C5a, and leukotriene B4, which these cells use to direct the path of their migration.

Neutrophils have a variety of specific receptors, including ones for the complement system, cytokines like interleukins and IFN-γ, chemokines, lectins, and other proteins. They also express receptors to detect and adhere to endothelium and Fc receptors for opsonin.

In leukocytes responding to a chemoattractant, the cellular polarity is regulated by activities of small Ras or Rho guanosine triphosphatases (Ras or Rho GTPases) and the phosphoinositide 3-kinases (PI3Ks). In neutrophils, lipid products of PI3Ks regulate activation of Rac1, hematopoietic Rac2, and RhoG GTPases of the Rho family and are required for cell motility. Ras-GTPases and Rac-GTPases regulate cytoskeletal dynamics and facilitate neutrophils adhesion, migration, and spreading. They accumulate asymmetrically to the plasma membrane at the leading edge of polarized cells. Spatially regulating Rho GTPases and organizing the leading edge of the cell, PI3Ks and their lipid products could play pivotal roles in establishing leukocyte polarity, as compass molecules that tell the cell where to crawl.

It has been shown in mice that in certain conditions neutrophils have a specific type of migration behaviour referred to as neutrophil swarming during which they migrate in a highly coordinated manner and accumulate and cluster to sites of inflammation.

=== Anti-microbial function ===
Being highly motile, neutrophils quickly congregate at a focus of infection, attracted by cytokines expressed by activated endothelium, mast cells, and macrophages. Neutrophils express and release cytokines, which in turn amplify inflammatory reactions by several other cell types.

In addition to recruiting and activating other cells of the immune system, neutrophils play a key role in the front-line defense against invading pathogens, and contain a broad range of proteins. Neutrophils have three methods for directly attacking microorganisms: phagocytosis (ingestion), degranulation (release of soluble anti-microbials), and generation of neutrophil extracellular traps (NETs).

==== Phagocytosis ====
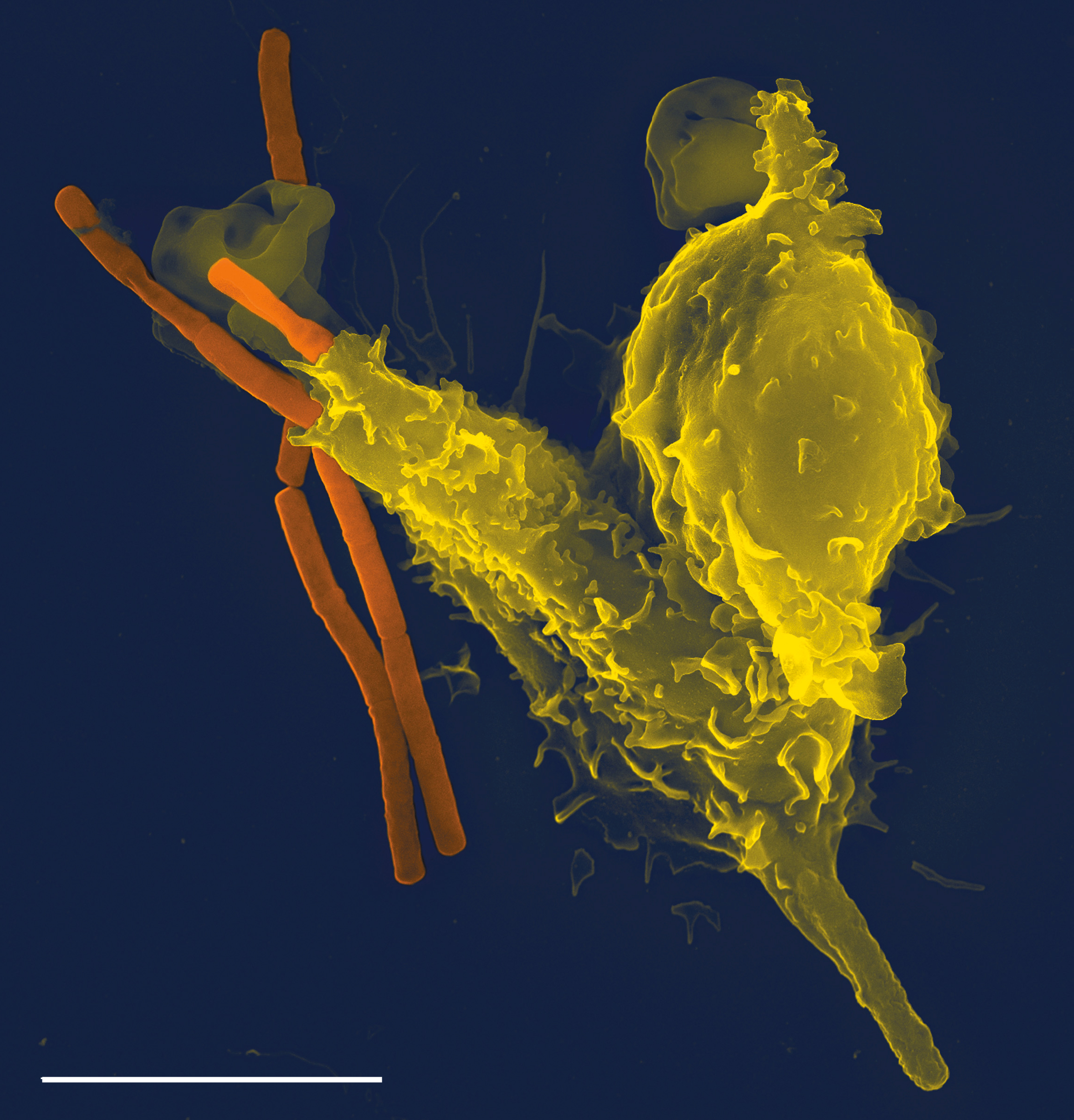
Scanning electron micrograph of a neutrophil (yellow) phagocytosing anthrax bacilli (orange). Scale bar is 5 μm.

Bacterial phagocytosis by neutrophil in human blood, invitro. The video is accelerated by a factor of 8.

Neutrophils are phagocytes, capable of ingesting microorganisms or particles. For targets to be recognized, they must be coated in opsonins – a process known as antibody opsonization. They can internalize and kill many microbes, each phagocytic event resulting in the formation of a phagosome into which reactive oxygen species and hydrolytic enzymes are secreted. The consumption of oxygen during the generation of reactive oxygen species has been termed the "respiratory burst", although unrelated to respiration or energy production.

The respiratory burst involves the activation of the enzyme NADPH oxidase, which produces large quantities of superoxide, a reactive oxygen species. Superoxide decays spontaneously or is broken down via enzymes known as superoxide dismutases (Cu/ZnSOD and MnSOD), to hydrogen peroxide, which is then converted to hypochlorous acid (HClO), by the green heme enzyme myeloperoxidase. It is thought that the bactericidal properties of HClO are enough to kill bacteria phagocytosed by the neutrophil, but this may instead be a step necessary for the activation of proteases.

Though neutrophils can kill many microbes, the interaction of neutrophils with microbes and molecules produced by microbes often alters neutrophil turnover. The ability of microbes to alter the fate of neutrophils is highly varied, can be microbe-specific, and ranges from prolonging the neutrophil lifespan to causing rapid neutrophil lysis after phagocytosis. Chlamydia pneumoniae and Neisseria gonorrhoeae have been reported to delay neutrophil apoptosis. Thus, some bacteria – and those that are predominantly intracellular pathogens – can extend the neutrophil lifespan by disrupting the normal process of spontaneous apoptosis and/or PICD (phagocytosis-induced cell death). On the other end of the spectrum, some pathogens such as Streptococcus pyogenes are capable of altering neutrophil fate after phagocytosis by promoting rapid cell lysis and/or accelerating apoptosis to the point of secondary necrosis.

==== Degranulation ====
Neutrophils also release an assortment of proteins in three types of granules by a process called degranulation. The contents of these granules have antimicrobial properties, and help combat infection. Glitter cells are polymorphonuclear leukocyte neutrophils with granules. Degranulation is postulated to occur in a hierarchical manner, with the sequential release of secretory vesicles, tertiary granules, specific granules, and azurophilic granules in response to increasing intracellular calcium concentrations. The release of neutrophils by degranulation occurs through exocytosis, regulated by exocytotic machinery including SNARE proteins, RAC2, RAB27, and others.

Granule type	Protein
Azurophilic granules (or "primary granules")	Myeloperoxidase, bactericidal/permeability-increasing protein (BPI), defensins, and the serine proteases neutrophil elastase, Proteinase 3 and cathepsin G
Specific granules (or "secondary granules")	Alkaline phosphatase, lysozyme, NADPH oxidase, collagenase, lactoferrin, histaminase, and cathelicidin
Tertiary granules	Cathepsin, gelatinase, and collagenase

==== Neutrophil extracellular traps ====
In 2004, Brinkmann and colleagues described a striking observation that activation of neutrophils causes the release of web-like structures of DNA; this represents a third mechanism for killing bacteria. These neutrophil extracellular traps (NETs) comprise a web of fibers composed of chromatin and serine proteases that trap and kill extracellular microbes; thus, by forming NETs (NETosis), neutrophils can bind, disarm, and kill microbes independent of phagocytic uptake. These functions are achieved through the release of highly concentrated antimicrobial components including proteins from granules and powerful histone proteins from the nucleus. In addition to their possible antimicrobial properties, NETs may serve as a physical barrier that prevents further spread of pathogens. Trapping of bacteria may be a particularly important role for NETs in sepsis, where NETs are formed within blood vessels. Finally, NET formation has been demonstrated to augment macrophage bactericidal activity during infection. Recently, NETs have been shown to play a role in inflammatory diseases, as NETs could be detected in preeclampsia, a pregnancy-related inflammatory disorder in which neutrophils are known to be activated. Neutrophil NET formation may also impact cardiovascular disease, as NETs may influence thrombus formation in coronary arteries. NETs are now known to exhibit pro-thrombotic effects both in vitro and in vivo. More recently, in 2020 NETs were implicated in the formation of blood clots in cases of severe COVID-19.

=== Tumor-associated neutrophils (TANs) ===
Tumor-associated neutrophils (TANs) can exhibit an elevated extracellular acidification rate when there is an increase in glycolysis levels. When there is a metabolic shift in TANs this can lead to tumor progression in certain areas of the body, such as the lungs. TANs support the growth and progression of tumors unlike normal neutrophils which would inhibit tumor progression through the phagocytosis of tumor cells. Utilizing a mouse model, they identified that both Glut1 and glucose metabolism increased in TANs found within a mouse who possessed lung adenocarcinoma. A study showed that lung tumor cells can remotely initiate osteoblasts and these osteoblasts can worsen tumors in two ways. First, they can induce SiglecF^{high}-expressing neutrophil formation that in turn promotes lung tumor growth and progression. Second, the osteoblasts can promote bone growth thus forming a favorable environment for tumor cells to grow to form bone metastasis.

== Clinical significance ==
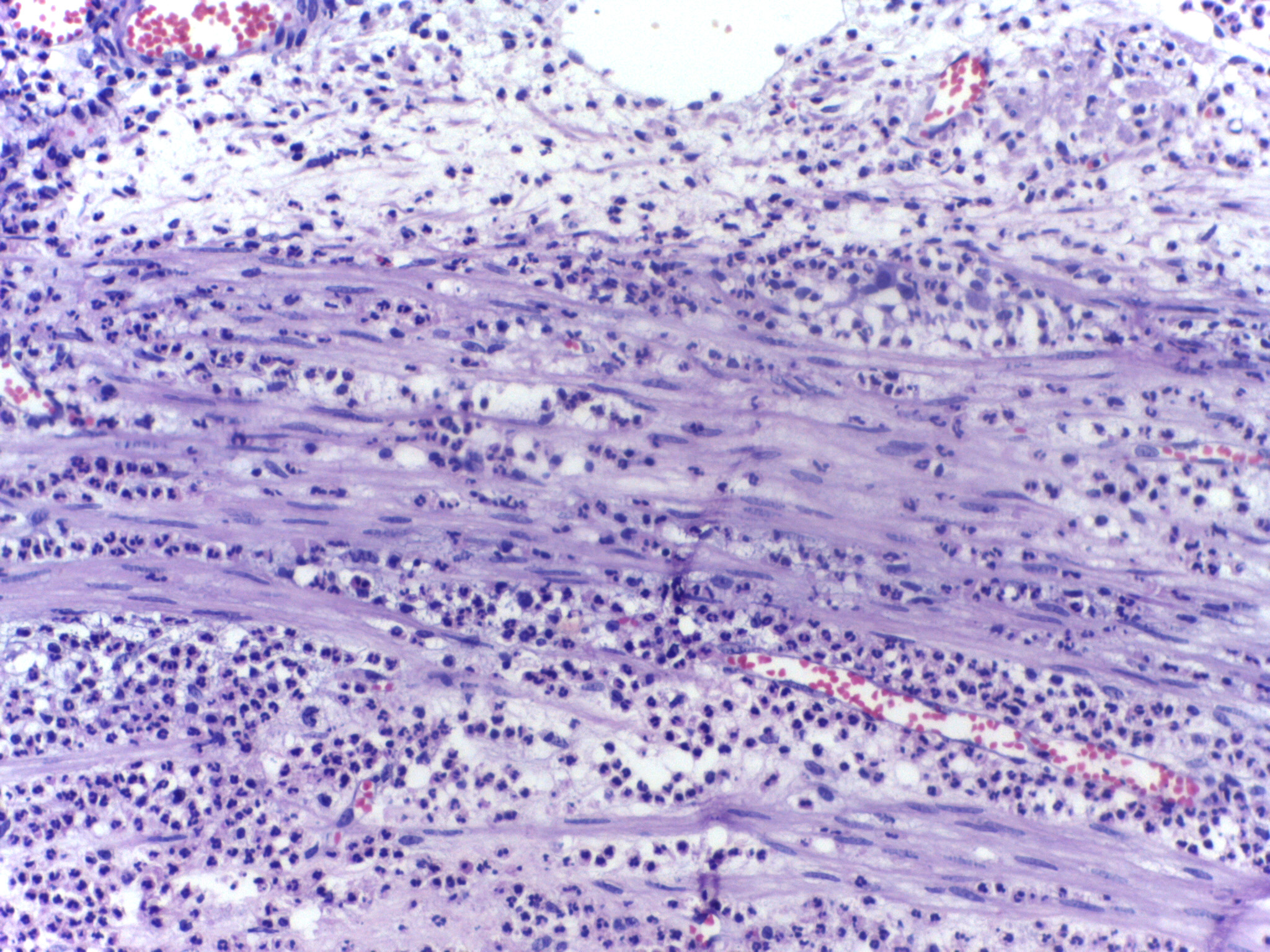
Micrograph showing several neutrophils during an acute inflammation

Low neutrophil counts are termed neutropenia. This can be congenital (developed at or before birth) or it can develop later, as in the case of aplastic anemia or some kinds of leukemia. It can also be a side-effect of medication, most prominently chemotherapy. Neutropenia makes an individual highly susceptible to infections. It can also be the result of colonization by intracellular neutrophilic parasites.

In alpha 1-antitrypsin deficiency, the important neutrophil elastase is not adequately inhibited by alpha 1-antitrypsin, leading to excessive tissue damage in the presence of inflammation – the most prominent one being emphysema. Negative effects of elastase have also been shown in cases when the neutrophils are excessively activated (in otherwise healthy individuals) and release the enzyme in extracellular space. Unregulated activity of neutrophil elastase can lead to disruption of pulmonary barrier showing symptoms corresponding with acute lung injury. The enzyme also influences activity of macrophages by cleaving their toll-like receptors (TLRs) and downregulating cytokine expression by inhibiting nuclear translocation of NF-κB.

In Familial Mediterranean fever (FMF), a mutation in the pyrin (or marenostrin) gene, which is expressed mainly in neutrophil granulocytes, leads to a constitutively active acute-phase response and causes attacks of fever, arthralgia, peritonitis, and – eventually – amyloidosis.

Hyperglycemia can lead to neutrophil dysfunction. Dysfunction in the neutrophil biochemical pathway myeloperoxidase as well as reduced degranulation are associated with hyperglycemia.

The Absolute neutrophil count (ANC) is also used in diagnosis and prognosis. ANC is the gold standard for determining severity of neutropenia, and thus neutropenic fever. Any ANC < 1500 cells / mm^{3} is considered neutropenia, but <500 cells / mm^{3} is considered severe. There is also new research tying ANC to myocardial infarction as an aid in early diagnosis. Neutrophils promote ventricular tachycardia in acute myocardial infarction.

In autopsy, the presence of neutrophils in the heart or brain is one of the first signs of infarction, and is useful in the timing and diagnosis of myocardial infarction and stroke.

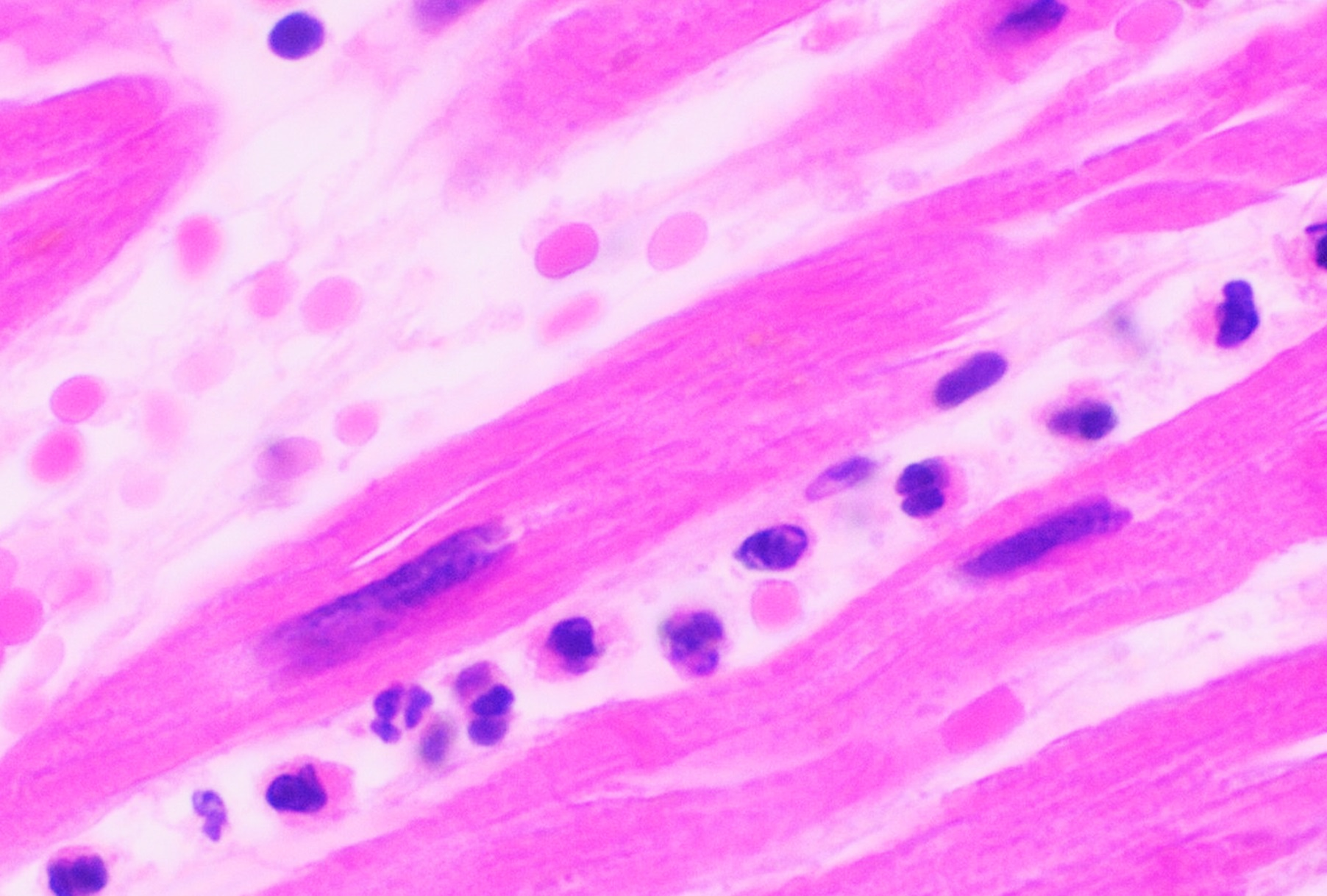
Neutrophils are seen in a myocardial infarction at approximately 12–24 hours, as seen in this micrograph.

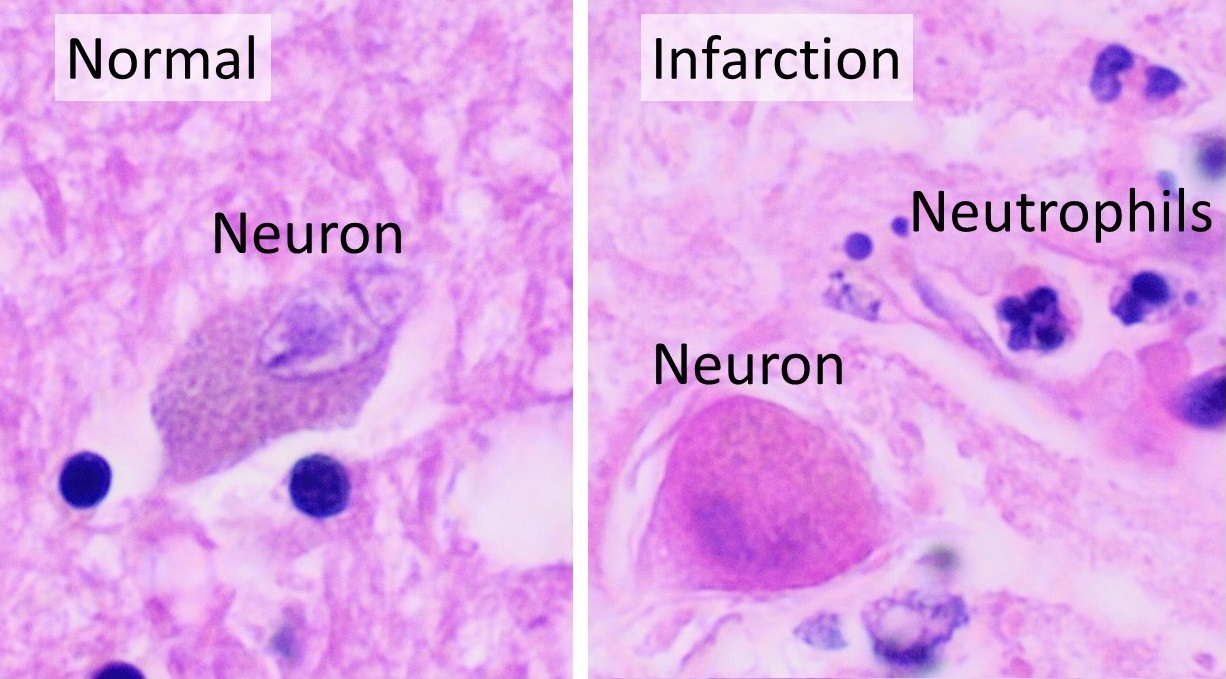
In stroke, they are beginning to infiltrate the infarcted brain after 6 to 8 hours.

== Pathogen evasion and resistance ==
Just like phagocytes, pathogens may evade or infect neutrophils. Some bacterial pathogens evolved various mechanisms such as virulence molecules to avoid being killed by neutrophils. These molecules collectively may alter or disrupt neutrophil recruitment, apoptosis or bactericidal activity.

Neutrophils can also serve as host cell for various parasites that infect them avoiding phagocytosis, including:

- Leishmania major – uses neutrophils as vehicle to parasitize phagocytes
- M. tuberculosis
- M. leprae
- Yersinia pestis
- Chlamydia pneumoniae

== Neutrophil antigens ==
There are five (HNA 1–5) sets of neutrophil antigens recognized. The three HNA-1 antigens (a-c) are located on the low affinity Fc-γ receptor IIIb (FCGR3B :CD16b) The single known HNA-2a antigen is located on CD177. The HNA-3 antigen system has two antigens (3a and 3b) which are located on the seventh exon of the CLT2 gene (SLC44A2). The HNA-4 and HNA-5 antigen systems each have two known antigens (a and b) and are located in the β2 integrin. HNA-4 is located on the αM chain (CD11b) and HNA-5 is located on the αL integrin unit (CD11a).

== Subpopulations ==
Activity of neutrophil-killer and neutrophil-cager in NBT test

Two functionally unequal subpopulations of neutrophils were identified on the basis of different levels of their reactive oxygen metabolite generation, membrane permeability, activity of enzyme system, and ability to be inactivated. The cells of one subpopulation with high membrane permeability (neutrophil-killers) intensively generate reactive oxygen metabolites and are inactivated in consequence of interaction with the substrate, whereas cells of another subpopulation (neutrophil-cagers) produce reactive oxygen species less intensively, don't adhere to substrate and preserve their activity. Additional studies have shown that lung tumors can be infiltrated by various populations of neutrophils.

== Video ==
A rapidly moving neutrophil can be seen taking up several conidia over an imaging time of 2 hours with one frame every 30 seconds.

A neutrophil can be seen here selectively taking up several Candida yeasts (fluorescently labeled in green) despite several contacts with Aspergillus fumigatus conidia (unlabeled, white/clear) in a 3-D collagen matrix. Imaging time was 2 hours with one frame every 30 seconds.

Neutrophils display highly directional amoeboid motility in infected footpad and phalanges. Intravital imaging was performed in the footpad path of LysM-eGFP mice 20 minutes after infection with Listeria monocytogenes.

== Additional images ==
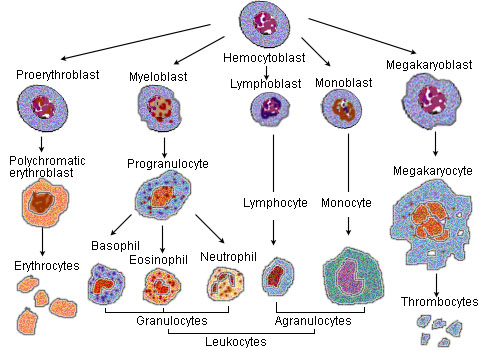
Blood cell lineage

More complete lineages

== See also ==
- List of distinct cell types in the adult human body
