= Neutrophil swarming =

An example of neutrophil swarming behavior by neutrophil extracellular traps. The neutrophil (green) surround branches of the Aspergillus Fumigatus (light blue) in infected lung tissue in a swarming manner and transport the branches to the neutrophil aggregates on the left. The dark blue color indicates lung tissue and the red color indicates DNA.

Neutrophil swarming is a type of coordinated neutrophil movement that acts in response to acute tissue inflammation or infection. The term comes from the swarming characteristics of insects that are similar to the behavior of neutrophils in response to an infection. These processes have mostly been studied in tissues of mice and studies of mouse ear tissue has proved to be very effective at observing neutrophil movement. Neutrophil swarming typically aggregates at surface layers of tissue so the thin nature of the mouse ear tissue makes for a good model to study this process. Additionally, zebrafish larvae have been used for the study of neutrophil movement mainly because of their translucence during the first few days of their development. With transgenic lines that fluorescently label zebrafish neutrophils, the cells can be tracked by epifluorescence or confocal microscopy during the course of an inflammatory response. Through this method, specific subpopulations of neutrophils can be tracked and their origin and fate during the induction and resolution of Inflammation is observed. Another advantage for using zebrafish to study neutrophil swarming is that adaptive immunity for this organism does not develop until around 4 weeks of age. This allows for the study of neutrophil movement and other host immune responses independent of adaptive immune responses.

== History ==
Originally, neutrophils were once seen as a solely homogenous (of the same type) populations but as of late, there had been discoveries that show that this is not the case. Instead, they are a mixture (heterogeneity) of mature neutrophils as they have been divided based on their production of cytokine expression of TLR (toll-like receptors), activation of macrophages in immunological responses, and host resistance, and lastly, in vitro angiogenesis and tumorigenesis.

== Communication ==
Neutrophils have two different forms of communication: homotypic and heterotypic. Homotypic communication, which is between a neutrophil and another neutrophil, is involved in the signaling when their bodies are fighting infections and inflammation. In order to carry out this type of communication, the neutrophils must cross the vascular endothelium and the basal membrane to pass into the interstitial space (IF). These are assisted by chemoattractant gradients as well as signal relays that interact between the neutrophils to carry out this signaling. In addition with communication with each other, the neutrophils must also communicate with the leukocytes (white blood cells) that are directly involved with immunological functions in the bodies of the neutrophils. This would be considered the heterotypic form of communication (neutrophil to leukocyte). Some of the functions of heterotypic communication include regulating when effector molecules are distributed, conducting immune responses, and also leaving lasting effects on cells even once they have been removed. This type of communication can also be referred to as cross-talk.

== Variations ==
A study of the lymph nodes of mice that were infected by injection of parasites into their earflaps revealed two types of neutrophil swarming: transient and persistent swarms. Transient swarms are characterized by groups of 10-150 neutrophils forming multiple small cell clusters within 10–40 minutes that quickly dispersed. Once the neutrophils moved dispersed, they join other close swarm centers and this oftentimes leads to competition as the neutrophil groups fight for recruiting neutrophils. Persistent swarms showed clusters of more than 300 neutrophils and recruitment lasted for more than 40 minutes. These persistent swarms are also characterized by having constant neutrophil recruitment with large-cell clustering, stable and longer term than transient (a few hours). For both the transient and persistent swarms, the formed neutrophil clusters appeared to be competing with each other with the larger clusters attracting neutrophils from the smaller clusters. The study also revealed two distinct phases in swarm formation. The first phase occurs when a small number of "pioneer" neutrophils respond to an initial signal and form small clusters and this is followed by the second phase where there are a large scale migration of neutrophils leading to the growth of multiple cell clusters. In terms of migration, neutrophils will do something called chemotactic migration in which they go into and out of a swarm center by accumulation (moving towards) or moving out. Another movement is with just individual neutrophils that go will go from one swarm to another when they are in competition. One interesting fact about these two swarm types is that they can work together in the same disrupted tissue in order to restore an inflamed tissue to its original composition.

The exact size or duration of swarms depends on the specific inflammatory conditions as well as the tissue type of the infection location. Several factors that influence the swarm phenotype are: the size of the initial tissue damage, the presence of pathogens, the induction of secondary cell death, and the number of recruited neutrophils. A study that compared large scale tissue damage of sterile mouse tissue by a needle prick with small injuries by a laser beam showed that the needle prick provoked a larger and longer swarm response. After the needle injury, hundreds to thousands of neutrophils were recruited that formed stable cell clusters that sometimes were prolonged for days. In comparison, the neutrophil swarms resulting from the laser induced injury only recruited around 50-330 neutrophils which persisted for a few hours. The presence of pathogens can also increase the size of neutrophil swarms, not necessarily because of their presence as a foreign body, but because of the additional cell death that they can cause in infection sites. When cells are lysed in an infection site, they release an assortment of signaling factors that augment the recruitment of neutrophils to the site. Additionally, neutrophil death during a swarm releases more signaling factors to recruit more neutrophils so the initial amount of neutrophils recruited plays a role in how large the propagation effect is during swarming.

== Stages ==
=== Stages 1-3 ===
The neutrophil swarming process is categorized into 5 phases: swarm initiation, swarm amplification, additional swarm amplification through intercellular signaling, swarm aggregation and tissue remodeling, and recruitment of myeloid cells and swarm resolution. The first stage of neutrophil swarming details the "pioneer" neutrophils responding to an infection or inflammation site. The neutrophils close to the injury will switch from random motility to chemotactic movement within a period of 5–15 minutes and swarm towards the infection site. In the second stage, the pioneer neutrophils attract a second wave of neutrophils that come from more distant regions of the tissue. The methods of movement to the region of injury depends on the tissue environment the neutrophils are moving towards. Neutrophil swarming in extravascular spaces such as the connective tissue in the skin involves movement without the assistance of integrin proteins and neutrophil attraction by a gradient of chemoattractants. Neutrophils will be guided by the forces generated by the actomyosin cytoskeleton through the path of least resistance to the site of infection. However, for intravascular tissue environments, neutrophil movement is dependent on integrins and chemoattractant signals on the luminal surface of endothelial cells. In this process, distant neutrophils will be recruited by an inflammatory signal and perform integrin-mediated crawling along the vascular walls to reach the neutrophil swarming sites.

In the third stage, swarming neutrophils can amplify their recruitment in a feed forward manner through intercellular communication by leukotriene B4 (LTB4). The propagation of neutrophil recruitment leads to multiple, dense neutrophil cell clusters at the site of inflammation. A 2013 study showed that neutrophils lacking the high affinity receptor for LTB4 (LTB4R1) decreased the recruitment of neutrophils at later stages of swarming. In addition, proximal cells to the inflammation site showed chemotaxis similar to the control cells while distant cells were poorly attracted. This finding suggests that the proximal neutrophils that are recruited early on are not affected by the lack of LTB4R1, but distant neutrophils that are required for the propagation of neutrophil swarming are not able to be recruited to the swarming site. These results present LTB4 as a key signaling molecule for a prolonged neutrophil swarm response and recruitment of neutrophils from distant areas of the tissue.

=== Stages 4-5 ===
After stages 1–3, neutrophils slow down in the cell clusters and begin to form aggregates. In this fourth stage, the neutrophil aggregates will aid in rearranging the surrounding extracellular tissue area and create a collagen-free zone at the inflammation center eventually resulting in a wound seal which isolates the site from the rest of the tissue. The exact mechanisms of this are unknown but it is believed that neutrophil proteases from the cell clusters play a role in clearing out the surrounding tissue environment. These neutrophil aggregates become stable as opposed to the constant movement in stages 1–3 by development of high chemoattractant concentrations within the clusters that promote local neutrophil interactions within the cluster. Additionally, neutrophils are switched to an adhesive mode of migration within clusters which further stabilize the aggregates and can prevent neutrophils from leaving the cluster. This switch is believed to be caused by additional secretions of LTB4 and other chemoattractants within the neutrophil aggregates.

In stage 5, the swarming response terminates and the clusters dissolve with the resolution of inflammation. Little is known about the mechanisms of this stage but the process may be regulated by neutrophils or external factors from the tissue environment. In a laser-induced skin injury model, neutrophil aggregation typically stopped after 40–60 minutes which occurs at the same time as the appearance of secondary myeloid cell swarms. Knock-in mice studies have shown that the myeloid cells move slower than neutrophils and assemble around the neutrophil aggregates during this stage. These myeloid cells may disrupt the propagation signals of neutrophil chemoattractants or to create competing attractants in the tissue space so that the neutrophil aggregation is less strong.

== External factors ==
When discussing the neutrophil swarming, it is important to address the other factors in the outside environment that can influence what is happening during migration of these neutrophils whether in packs or individually. A massive influence of neutrophils occurs when there is some sort of inflammatory problem occurring as they influence autocrine and paracrine signaling, involved in the clustering up and recruiting of the neutrophils themselves. Neutrophil swarming are influenced by three main external factors: type of tissues involved, nearby tissue-specific or immune cells, and something referred to as chemoattractant (or when there is a chemical substance that influences a bacterium to move in the direction of their increasing concentration). One of the external factors that impact how communication occurs is the tissue context, as these each have a specific signal that can influence the swarming (the size and persistence of the neutrophil swarms). Two of these types are extravascular swarming and intravascular swarming. The extravascular swarming is due to integrin-independent interstitial movement as well as using soluble directional aspects like LTB4 that affects neutrophil attraction. Extravascular swarming consists of fibrillar (ex. skin) and cell rich (ex. lymph node) while intravascular consists of intrasinusoidal, with an example being the liver.

== Swarming signals ==
Two triggers of neutrophil swarming include PAMPs or Pathogen Associated Molecular Patterns and DAMPs or Damage-Associated Molecular Patterns. One attribute of note in neutrophil swarming is that it is a conserved protective mechanism that respond when tissues undergo disruption. This can occur in many different tissues of the body includes the ears, liver, lung, and skin. The neutrophil warming can also participate in activating pathogen containment, keeping foreign substances localized and easier to treat and rid the body of later on.

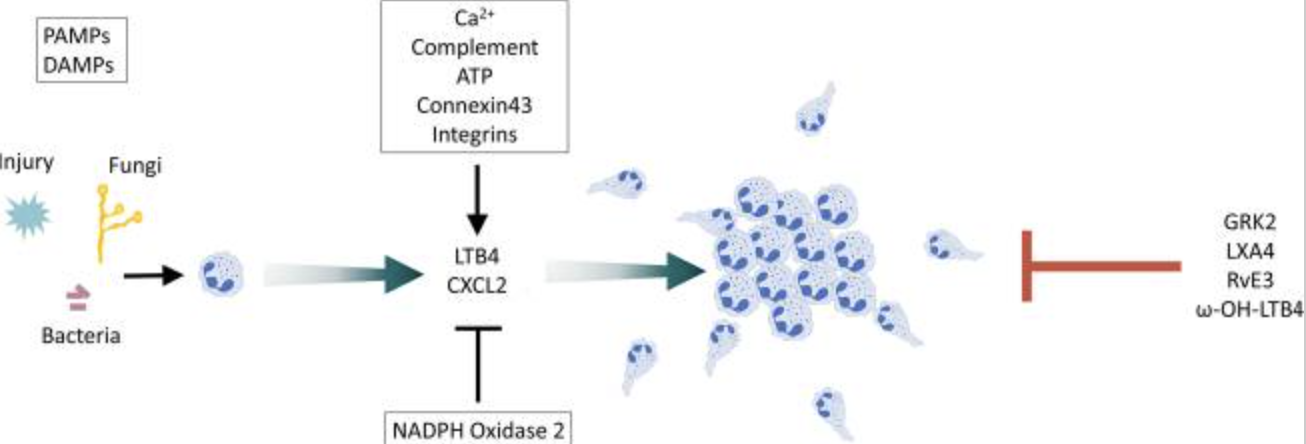
Figure 1: This figure shows neutrophil swarming starts and stops.

In the figure above, we see that at the start of neutrophil swarming, we begin with either an injury, fungi, or bacteria. As discussed above the PAMPs and the DAMPs trigger the initial neutrophil swarming. Then the LTB4 and CXCL2, which are chemoattractants, that are there to further the signals that cause a cascade of intracellular reactions to the disruptions and foreign substances. These begin a process known as swarm aggregation where the bacterial or other substances begin to all congregate together into one massive "ball" of bacteria, as shown above after the second green arrow. Another part of the image includes the box above the LTB4 and CXCL2, including Calcium, complement, ATP, Connexin 43, and Integrins. These also contribute to the chemoattractants by amplifying their signal and causing the swarm aggregation to run more forwardly. However, below is the NADPH Oxidase 2 or NOX2 is a negative regulator of the chemoattractants that may disrupt the events from proceeding forward. These events previously show how neutrophil swarming begins while the steps ahead are going to explain the ending of this process once the body no longer needs this to occur for its health and well-being, if the bacteria fungi or injury has resolved. The most crucial step in terminating the neutrophil swarming is when GPCR kinase 2 or GRK2 has phosphorylated or desensitized the GPCRs (G-protein coupled receptors). Then the other three, Lipoxin A4, resolving E3, and w-OH-LTB4 assist the GRK2 in stopping this process fully.

== Essential regulators of signaling ==
One of the regulators of signaling includes Calcium. It is one of the positive regulators to chemoattractants such as LTB4 and CXCL2. To obtain calcium, the cell must get the calcium from the intracellular endoplasmic reticulum (ER) or from the extracellular matrix. For the endoplasmic reticulum calcium sequestering, the cell uses a process called SOCE or store-operated calcium entry that induces cascades of signaling via receptors and these then stimulate the release of calcium out of the ER. In order to bring the Calcium from outside the cell a much more complex process occurs by using CRAC or calcium release-activated calcium channels (which also have something called ORAI family members in them). Before this can occur, however, stromal interaction molecule proteins (STIM) must detect the calcium and this then allows the ER to sense a change thus changing their shape and allowing these CRAC channels to gate between the intracellular ER and the extracellular space in order that calcium may be through into the cell then driving downstream mechanisms that were dependent on calcium. During swarming, neutrophils notably exhibit sustained calcium activity in the center of the swarm and produces calcium waves.

Another part of regulation includes the chemokines and the cytokines. There are two chemokines that work cooperatively in neutrophil swarming operations, CXCL2 and LTB4. They did tests in order to find out that CXCL2 did in fact assist, making a noticeable impact on the driving of swarming. But, it was a little more complicated than just that one chemokine. In coupling with inhibition of CXCR1 as well as BLT1 and BLT2 there was a decrease in chemoattractant inducement (also known as chemotactic index). In summary, there is a chemokine called CXCL8, which is basically a ligand of CXCR1 and 2 that alongside LTB4 positively promotes the swarming in neutrophils.

== Basics of neutrophils ==
In order to properly understand neutrophil swarming, one must also understand the basics of the structure and function of neutrophils. They are leukocytes (white blood cells) that are the most abundant WBC in the body and are known for their role in the immune system.

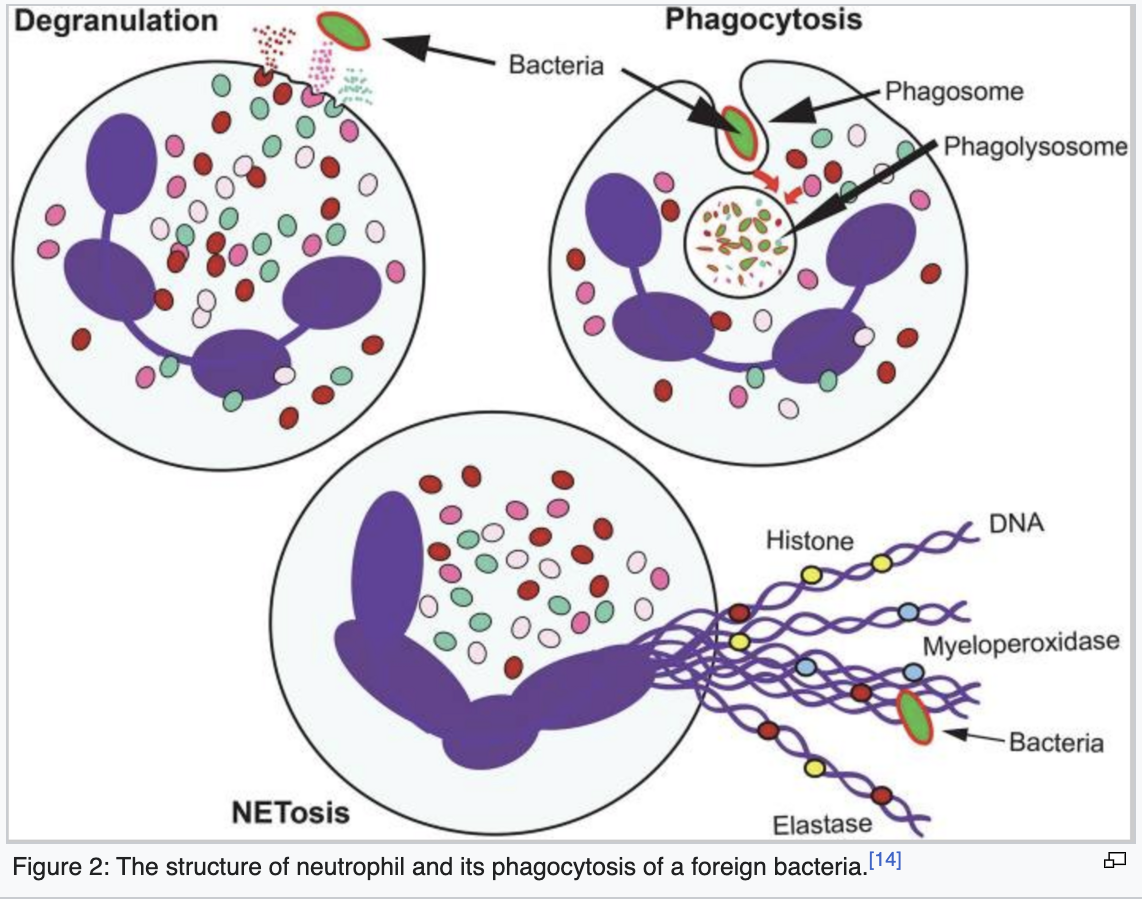

In figure 2, it shows the main three ways in which a neutrophil can approach attacking and getting rid of a foreign antigen or bacteria. The top left illustrates degranulation, a process in which the neutrophil itself degradulates and then releases its substances in the outer circulation in which the bacteria lies. These contents work to destroy/break down the bacteria. The second way, on the upper right, shows phagocytosis. This is when the bacteria is brought into the neutrophil by the plasma membrane engulfing it and pulling it inside to create a vacuole. The engulfing process begins with a bacteria, then turns into a phagosome when it being to form a vacuole, and lastly becomes a phagolysosome that contain broken down bacteria with contents from the neutrophil environment inside. These contents have enzymes that degrade the bacteria coupled with a low pH of the internal environment. Lastly, in the bottom part of the image, it shows NETosis. Comparatively to the other bacteria, the bacteria are much larger and thus need this process to be combatted. It includes the creation of NETs or neutrophil extracellular traps that are composed of DNA wrapped around histones and proteins like myeloperoxidase and elastase. These DNA string extensions along with the helper proteins envelop the bacteria and these break down the bacteria. All three of these processes show the action that neutrophils have in targeting and destroying foreign substances, their main job in the body.
