= Pigmentation disorder =

- Specialty: Dermatology

Pigmentation disorders are disturbances of human skin color. There may be a loss or reduction, which may be related to loss of melanocytes or the inability of melanocytes to produce melanin or transport melanosomes correctly.

Most pigmentation disorders involve the underproduction or overproduction of melanin.

== Causes ==
Skin pigmentation is a frequent disorder that has a number of potential causes. Genetics, sun exposure, and some drugs are the three main factors that contribute to skin pigmentation.

The most frequent cause of low melanin concentration (hypopigmentation) is prior skin trauma, which includes skin lesions including blisters, burns, infections, exposure to chemicals, and other wounds. The skin will appear paler than the surrounding skin surface once an injury has healed.

Different areas of the skin may be hypopigmented as a result of other genetic illnesses. Hypopigmentation can be caused by hereditary conditions such as vitiligo, melasma, pityriasis versicolor, pityriasis alba, albinism, and fungal infections.

Hyperpigmentation results from an increase in melanin synthesis, which is mostly brought on by sun exposure, dermatological disorders, hormones, aging, genetic factors, skin injuries or inflammation, and acne. Sun exposure, which greatly increases the synthesis of melanin, is the most common cause of hyperpigmentation.

== Mechanism ==
Genetics is one of the most common causes of skin color. Skin cells called melanocytes are responsible for producing melanin. The number of melanocytes that each person will have may be predicted by genetics. Melanosomes, which are organelles containing melanin, must be transported and increased during hyperpigmentation and tanning, while they shrink during hypopigmentation.

Skin pigmentation is frequently caused by sun exposure. To protect itself against UV radiation from the sun, the body makes more melanin. As a result, the skin may become more pigmented to protect it from the sun's rays.

The pigmentation of the skin may also be lightened by certain drugs. Antibiotics are one type of medications that can increase the synthesis of melanin, which darkens skin. Skin pigmentation may also become more intense when certain drugs, such birth control pills, are taken concurrently.
