= EXPH5 =

Protein-coding gene in the species Homo sapiens

Identifiers
- Aliases: EXPH5, SLAC2-B, SLAC2B, exophilin 5, EBS4
- External IDs: OMIM: 612878; MGI: 2443248; HomoloGene: 9007; GeneCards: EXPH5; OMA:EXPH5 - orthologs

Gene location (Human)
Chr.	Chromosome 11 (human)
Band	11q22.3	Start	108,505,435 bp
Band	11q22.3	End	108,593,768 bp

Gene location (Mouse)
Chr.	Chromosome 9 (mouse)
Band	9|9 A5.3	Start	53,212,970 bp
Band	9|9 A5.3	End	53,288,814 bp
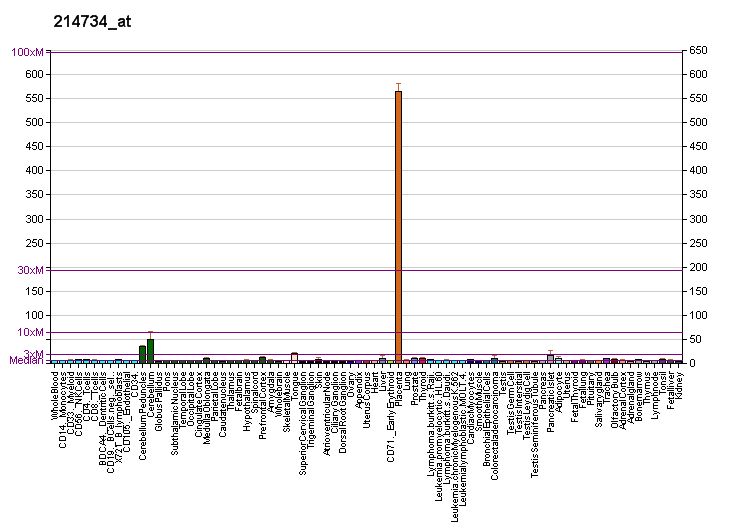
RNA expression pattern
Bgee	Human / Mouse (ortholog); Top expressed in: skin of hip; mucosa of paranasal sinus; amniotic fluid; oral cavity; skin of thigh; bronchial epithelial cell; skin of arm; nipple; nasal epithelium; gums / Top expressed in: cerebellar cortex; jejunum; zone of skin; liver; ileum; esophagus; lip; stomach; spermatocyte; lung; More reference expression data
BioGPS	More reference expression data
Orthologs
Species	Human	Mouse
Entrez	23086	320051
Ensembl	ENSG00000110723	ENSMUSG00000034584
UniProt	Q8NEV8	Q0VAV2
RefSeq (mRNA)	NM_001144763; NM_001144764; NM_001144765; NM_001308019; NM_015065	NM_176846
RefSeq (protein)	NP_001138235; NP_001138236; NP_001138237; NP_001294948; NP_055880	NP_789816
Location (UCSC)	Chr 11: 108.51 – 108.59 Mb	Chr 9: 53.21 – 53.29 Mb
PubMed search
- Wikidata
View/Edit Human	View/Edit Mouse

Exophilin 5, also known as EXPH5, is a human gene.

== Interactions ==
EXPH5 has been shown to interact with RAB27A.
