= Glitter cell =

Glitter cells (also called Sternheimer-Malbin positive cells) are polymorphonuclear leukocyte neutrophils with granules that show a Brownian movement and that are found in the urine, most commonly associated with urinary tract infections or pyelonephritis and especially prevalent under conditions of hypotonic urine (samples with specific gravity less than 1.01). First described in 1908, they derive their name from their appearance when viewed on a wet mount preparation under a microscope; the granules within their cytoplasm can be seen moving, giving them a "glittering appearance." due to swelling of the neutrophil as result of hypotonicity. In addition to a glittering morphology, glitter cells also exhibit a colorless or pale blue nuclei and pale blue or gray cytoplasmic region when stained with Sternheimer-Malbin Stain. The presence of glitter cells may be indicative of inflammatory changes in the bladder and kidney.
