= RAB27A =

Protein-coding gene in humans

Identifiers
- Aliases: RAB27A, GS2, HsT18676, RAB27, RAM, member RAS oncogene family
- External IDs: OMIM: 603868; MGI: 1861441; GeneCards: RAB27A
Enzyme activity
EC #	BRENDA	ExPASy	KEGG	MetaCyc
3.6.5.2	↗	↗	↗	↗

Gene location (Human)
Chr.	Chromosome 15 (human)
Band	15q21.3	Start	55,202,966 bp
Band	15q21.3	End	55,319,113 bp

Gene location (Mouse)
Chr.	Chromosome 9 (mouse)
Band	9 D|9 40.08 cM	Start	72,952,136 bp
Band	9 D|9 40.08 cM	End	73,004,911 bp
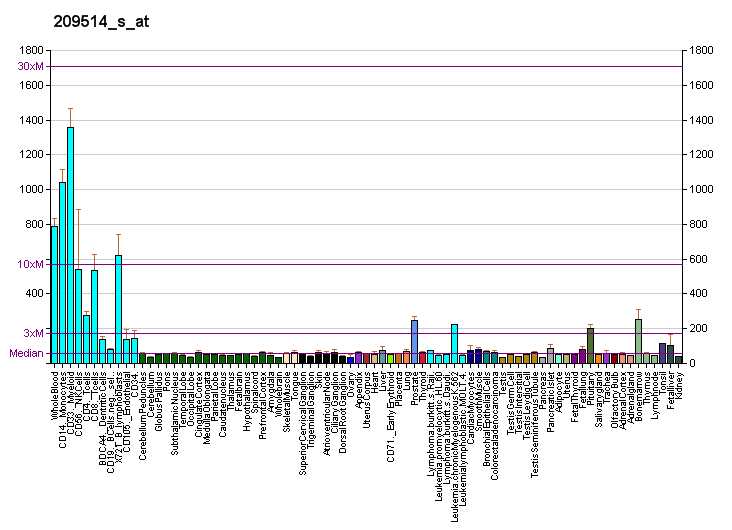

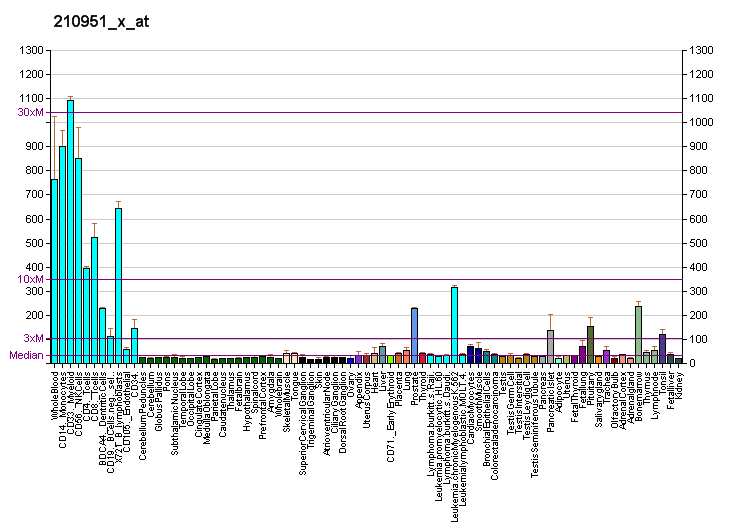

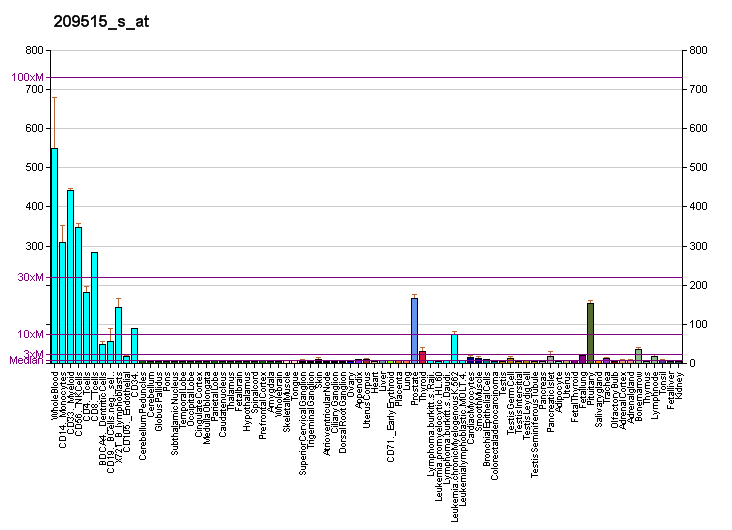
RNA expression pattern
Bgee	Human / Mouse (ortholog); Top expressed in: trabecular bone; monocyte; lower lobe of lung; bone marrow; mucosa of sigmoid colon; bone marrow cell; blood; secondary oocyte; retinal pigment epithelium; rectum / Top expressed in: granulocyte; retinal pigment epithelium; epithelium of stomach; lacrimal gland; iris; salivary gland; islet of Langerhans; parotid gland; zygote; left lung lobe; More reference expression data
BioGPS	More reference expression data
Gene ontology
Molecular function	nucleotide binding; protein domain specific binding; GDP binding; GTP binding; myosin V binding; protein binding; GTPase activity
Cellular component	Weibel-Palade body; endosome; late endosome; Golgi apparatus; multivesicular body membrane; exocytic vesicle; secretory granule membrane; membrane; melanosome; photoreceptor outer segment; secretory granule; dendrite; apical plasma membrane; lysosome; extracellular exosome; extracellular region; cytosol; melanosome membrane; specific granule lumen; synapse
Biological process	positive regulation of reactive oxygen species biosynthetic process; natural killer cell degranulation; protein targeting; positive regulation of phagocytosis; antigen processing and presentation; multivesicular body sorting pathway; pigment granule localization; blood coagulation; melanosome localization; pigment granule transport; positive regulation of gene expression; multivesicular body organization; melanosome transport; positive regulation of constitutive secretory pathway; synaptic vesicle transport; complement-dependent cytotoxicity; pigmentation; cytotoxic T cell degranulation; exosomal secretion; positive regulation of exocytosis; melanocyte differentiation; vesicle-mediated transport; positive regulation of regulated secretory pathway; exocytosis; neutrophil degranulation; intracellular protein transport; Rab protein signal transduction
Sources:Amigo / QuickGO
Orthologs
Databases	NCBI: entry; OMA: entry
Species	Human	Mouse
Entrez	5873	11891
Ensembl	ENSG00000069974	ENSMUSG00000032202
UniProt	P51159	Q9ERI2
RefSeq (mRNA)	NM_004580; NM_183234; NM_183235; NM_183236	NM_001301230; NM_001301232; NM_023635
RefSeq (protein)	NP_004571; NP_899057; NP_899058; NP_899059	NP_001288159; NP_001288161; NP_076124
Location (UCSC)	Chr 15: 55.2 – 55.32 Mb	Chr 9: 72.95 – 73 Mb
PubMed search
- Wikidata
View/Edit Human	View/Edit Mouse

Ras-related protein Rab-27A is a protein that in humans is encoded by the RAB27A gene.

== Function ==
The protein encoded by this gene belongs to the small GTPase superfamily, Rab family. The protein is membrane-bound and may be involved in protein transport and small GTPase mediated signal transduction. Mutations in this gene are associated with Griscelli syndrome type 2 and hemophagocytic lymphohistiocytosis. Alternative splicing occurs at this locus and four transcript variants encoding the same protein have been identified.

The RAB27A gene is regulated by the Microphthalmia-associated transcription factor.

== Interactions ==
RAB27A has been shown to interact with:

- EXPH5,
- MYO5A,
- RPH3AL
- SYTL1, and
- SYTL2.

== See also ==
- Rab27
