= Chédiak–Higashi syndrome =

- Chédiak–Higashi syndrome is inherited in an autosomal recessive manner.
- Specialty: Endocrinology

Chédiak–Higashi syndrome (CHS) is a rare autosomal recessive disorder that arises from a mutation of a lysosomal trafficking regulator protein, which leads to a decrease in phagocytosis. The decrease in phagocytosis results in recurrent pyogenic infections, albinism, and peripheral neuropathy.

In Chédiak–Higashi syndrome, the lysosomal trafficking regulator (LYST) gene is mutated, leading to disruption of protein synthesis as well as the storage and secretory function of lysosomal granules in white blood cells. This results in defective white blood cell function with enlarged vesicles. This syndrome also leads to neutropenia and phagocyte bactericidal dysfunction due to impaired chemotaxis. Deficiency in serotonin and adenosine-phosphate-containing granules in platelets causes impaired platelet aggregation, leading to prolonged bleeding time. Thus, patients are susceptible to infections and often present with oculo-cutaneous albinism and coagulation defects. Patients often present with early-onset aggressive periodontitis associated with advanced alveolar bone loss and tooth mobility due to neutropenia and defective neutrophil function. Recurrent oral ulcerations are also one of the common oral manifestations in patients with this disease. Dental practitioners who notice child patients who present with recurrent unexplained gingivitis and periodontitis along with hypopigmentation of hair, skin and eyes should consider making a referral to medical practitioners to investigate for the possible diagnosis of Chédiak–Higashi syndrome.

== Signs and symptoms ==
People with CHS have light skin and silvery hair (albinism) and frequently complain of solar sensitivity and photophobia. Other signs and symptoms vary considerably, but frequent infections and neuropathy are common. The infections involve mucous membranes, skin, and the respiratory tract. Affected children are susceptible to infection by Gram-positive and gram-negative bacteria and fungi, with Staphylococcus aureus being the most common infectious cause. Infections in CHS patients tend to be very serious and even life-threatening. Neuropathy often begins in the teenage years and becomes the most prominent problem. Few patients with this condition live to adulthood.

Most children with Chédiak–Higashi syndrome ultimately reach a stage known as the "accelerated phase", or the "lymphoma-like syndrome", in which defective white blood cells divide uncontrollably and invade many of the body's organs. The accelerated phase is associated with fever, episodes of abnormal bleeding, overwhelming infections, and organ failure. These medical problems are usually life-threatening in childhood.

== Causes ==
Mutations in the CHS1 gene (also called LYST) located on the chromosome 1q42-q43 have been found to be connected with Chédiak–Higashi syndrome. This gene provides instructions for making a protein known as the lysosomal trafficking regulator. Researchers believe that this protein plays a role in the transport (trafficking) of materials into lysosomes. Lysosomes act as recycling centers within cells. They use digestive enzymes to break down toxic substances, digest bacteria that invade the cell and recycle worn-out cell components. Although the lysosomal trafficking regulator protein is involved in the normal function of lysosomes, its exact role is unknown.

In melanocytic cells, LYST gene expression may be regulated by MITF. Mutations in MITF are known to cause Waardenburg syndrome type 2 and Tietz syndrome, which result in depigmentation and deafness.

== Pathophysiology ==
CHS is a disease causing impaired bacteriolysis due to failure of phagolysosome formation. As a result of disordered intracellular trafficking there is impaired lysosome degranulation with phagosomes, so phagocytosed bacteria are not destroyed by the lysosome's enzymes.

In addition, secretion of lytic secretory granule by cytotoxic T cells is affected.

The disease is characterised by large lysosome vesicles in phagocytes (neutrophils), which thus have poor bactericidal function, leading to susceptibility to infections, abnormalities in nuclear structure of leukocytes, anemia, and hepatomegaly. Döhle bodies (remnants of endoplasmic reticulum) in the neutrophil are also seen.

== Diagnosis ==
The diagnosis is confirmed by bone marrow smears that show "giant inclusion bodies" in the cells that develop into white blood cells (leukocyte precursor cells). CHS can be diagnosed prenatally by examining a sample of hair from a fetal scalp biopsy or testing leukocytes from a fetal blood sample.

=== Clinical findings ===
There are several manifestations of Chédiak–Higashi syndrome as mentioned above; however, neutropenia seems to be the most common. The syndrome is associated with oculocutaneous albinism. Patients are prone to infections, especially with Staphylococcus aureus, as well as Streptococci.

It is associated with periodontal disease of the deciduous dentition. Associated features include abnormalities in melanocytes (albinism), nerve defects, and bleeding disorders.

== Treatment ==
There is no specific treatment for Chédiak–Higashi syndrome. Bone marrow transplants appear to have been successful in several patients. Infections are treated with antibiotics and abscesses are surgically drained when appropriate. Antiviral drugs such as acyclovir have been tried during the terminal phase of the disease. Cyclophosphamide and prednisone have been tried. Vitamin C therapy has improved immune function and clotting in some patients.

== Eponym ==
It is named for the Cuban physician and serologist of Lebanese descent Moisés Chédiak Ahuayda (1903–1993) and the Japanese pediatrician Ototaka Higashi (1883–1981). It is often spelled without the accent as Chediak–Higashi syndrome.

== Other species ==
It also occurs in cattle, blue Persian cats, Australian blue rats, mice, minks, foxes, and the only known captive white orca.

== See also ==
- Griscelli syndrome (also known as "Chédiak–Higashi like syndrome")
