= Griscelli syndrome type 3 =

- Other names: Griscelli-Pruniéras syndrome type 3
- This condition is inherited in an autosomal recessive manner.

Griscelli syndrome type 3 is a disorder of melanosome transport presenting initially with hypopigmentation.

== See also ==
- Griscelli syndrome
