= SYTL1 =

Protein-coding gene in humans

Identifiers
- Aliases: SYTL1, JFC1, SLP1, synaptotagmin like 1
- External IDs: OMIM: 608042; MGI: 1933365; GeneCards: SYTL1

Gene location (Human)
Chr.	Chromosome 1 (human)
Band	1p36.11	Start	27,342,020 bp
Band	1p36.11	End	27,353,937 bp

Gene location (Mouse)
Chr.	Chromosome 4 (mouse)
Band	4|4 D2.3	Start	132,980,401 bp
Band	4|4 D2.3	End	132,990,424 bp
RNA expression pattern
Bgee	Human / Mouse (ortholog); Top expressed in: granulocyte; right uterine tube; body of pancreas; skin of abdomen; skin of arm; olfactory zone of nasal mucosa; skin of leg; gingival epithelium; spleen; cerebellar hemisphere / Top expressed in: esophagus; lip; transitional epithelium of urinary bladder; granulocyte; molar; skin of abdomen; skin of external ear; skin of back; pyloric antrum; left colon; More reference expression data
BioGPS	n/a
Gene ontology
Molecular function	calcium-dependent phospholipid binding; clathrin binding; calcium ion binding; neurexin family protein binding; syntaxin binding; protein binding
Cellular component	melanosome; plasma membrane; extrinsic component of plasma membrane; extracellular exosome; exocytic vesicle; membrane; presynapse; microvillus membrane
Biological process	intracellular protein transport; exocytosis; calcium ion-regulated exocytosis of neurotransmitter; vesicle fusion; regulation of calcium ion-dependent exocytosis
Sources:Amigo / QuickGO
Orthologs
Databases	NCBI: entry; OMA: entry
Species	Human	Mouse
Entrez	84958	269589
Ensembl	ENSG00000142765	ENSMUSG00000028860
UniProt	Q8IYJ3	Q99N80
RefSeq (mRNA)	NM_001193308; NM_032872	NM_031393
RefSeq (protein)	NP_001180237; NP_116261	n/a
Location (UCSC)	Chr 1: 27.34 – 27.35 Mb	Chr 4: 132.98 – 132.99 Mb
PubMed search
- Wikidata
View/Edit Human	View/Edit Mouse

Synaptotagmin-like protein 1 is a protein that in humans is encoded by the SYTL1 gene.

== Interactions ==
SYTL1 has been shown to interact with RAB27A.
