= SPIRE1 =

Identifiers
- Aliases: SPIRE1, Spir-1, spire type actin nucleation factor 1
- External IDs: OMIM: 609216; MGI: 1915416; GeneCards: SPIRE1
Available structures
PDB	Ortholog search: PDBe RCSB
PDB	List of PDB id codes 2YLE, 2YLF, 3R7G, 3RBW

Gene location (Human)
Chr.	Chromosome 18 (human)
Band	18p11.21	Start	12,446,512 bp
Band	18p11.21	End	12,658,107 bp

Gene location (Mouse)
Chr.	Chromosome 18 (mouse)
Band	18|18 E1	Start	67,488,209 bp
Band	18|18 E1	End	67,610,790 bp
RNA expression pattern
Bgee	Human / Mouse (ortholog); Top expressed in: ganglionic eminence; internal globus pallidus; endothelial cell; pancreatic epithelial cell; ventricular zone; myocardium of left ventricle; Achilles tendon; cardiac muscle tissue of right atrium; postcentral gyrus; pancreatic ductal cell / Top expressed in: secondary oocyte; primary oocyte; zygote; visual cortex; primary visual cortex; superior frontal gyrus; ventricular zone; cerebellar cortex; otolith organ; utricle; More reference expression data
BioGPS	n/a
Gene ontology
Molecular function	actin binding
Cellular component	cytoplasm; perinuclear region of cytoplasm; plasma membrane; cell cortex; cleavage furrow; cytoskeleton; cytoplasmic vesicle membrane; membrane; cytoplasmic vesicle; nucleoplasm; cytosol
Biological process	protein transport; establishment of meiotic spindle localization; actin nucleation; intracellular transport; formin-nucleated actin cable assembly; polar body extrusion after meiotic divisions; cleavage furrow formation; vesicle-mediated transport; actin cytoskeleton organization; positive regulation of double-strand break repair
Sources:Amigo / QuickGO
Orthologs
Databases	NCBI: entry; OMA: entry
Species	Human	Mouse
Entrez	56907	68166
Ensembl	ENSG00000134278	ENSMUSG00000024533
UniProt	Q08AE8	Q52KF3
RefSeq (mRNA)	NM_001128626; NM_001128627; NM_020148; NM_001394323; NM_001394324 NM_001394325	NM_176832; NM_194355
RefSeq (protein)	NP_001122098; NP_001122099; NP_064533	NP_789802; NP_919336; NP_001390588; NP_001390589; NP_001390590
Location (UCSC)	Chr 18: 12.45 – 12.66 Mb	Chr 18: 67.49 – 67.61 Mb
PubMed search
- Wikidata
View/Edit Human	View/Edit Mouse

Protein spire homolog 1 is a protein that in humans is encoded by the SPIRE1 gene. SPIRE1 interacts with actin monomers and actin nucleating formin proteins. SPIRE1 was first identified in Drosophila melanogaster. SPIRE1 contains an N-terminal KIND domain which binds formins and four actin-binding WH2 domains which nucleate actin filaments.
