= Unconventional myosin-Va =

Protein-coding gene in the species Homo sapiens

MYO5A
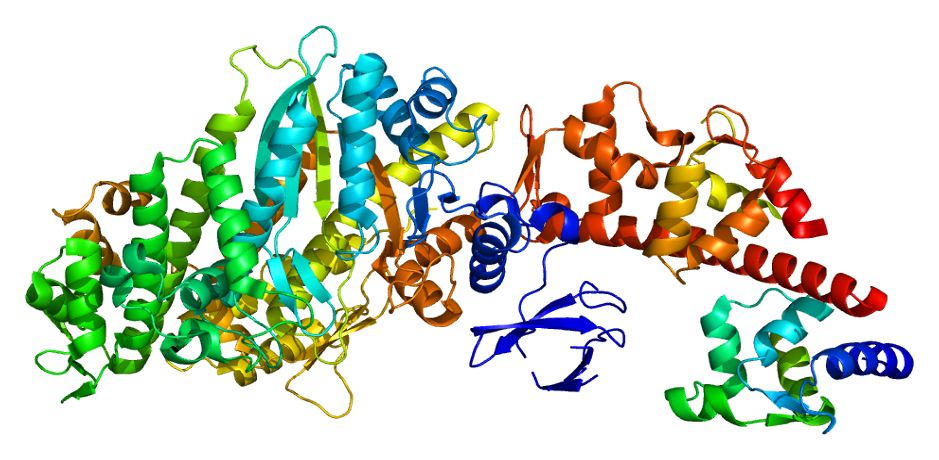

Identifiers
- Aliases: MYO5A, GS1, MYH12, MYO5, MYR12, myosin VA
- External IDs: OMIM: 160777; MGI: 105976; GeneCards: MYO5A
Available structures
PDB	Ortholog search: PDBe RCSB
PDB	List of PDB id codes 4J5L, 4LX1, 4LX2, 4LLI, 4D07

Gene location (Human)
Chr.	Chromosome 15 (human)
Band	15q21.2	Start	52,307,281 bp
Band	15q21.2	End	52,529,132 bp

Gene location (Mouse)
Chr.	Chromosome 9 (mouse)
Band	9 D|9 42.26 cM	Start	74,978,297 bp
Band	9 D|9 42.26 cM	End	75,130,970 bp
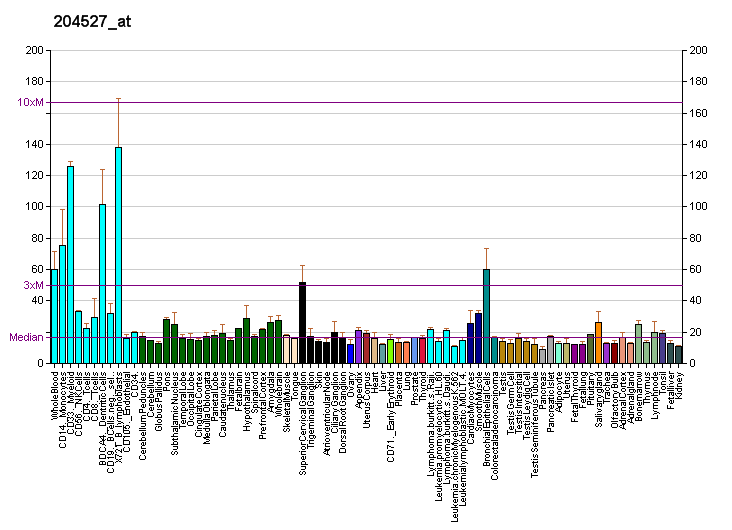
RNA expression pattern
Bgee	Human / Mouse (ortholog); Top expressed in: lateral nuclear group of thalamus; endothelial cell; pars compacta; Brodmann area 23; pars reticulata; parietal lobe; postcentral gyrus; pons; superior frontal gyrus; entorhinal cortex / Top expressed in: medial geniculate nucleus; pontine nuclei; medial dorsal nucleus; ventral tegmental area; lateral geniculate nucleus; stroma of bone marrow; subiculum; dorsal tegmental nucleus; habenula; globus pallidus; More reference expression data
BioGPS	More reference expression data
Gene ontology
Molecular function	calcium ion binding; nucleotide binding; calmodulin binding; microfilament motor activity; actin binding; cytoskeletal motor activity; ATP binding; RNA binding; disordered domain specific binding; identical protein binding; protein binding; actin filament binding
Cellular component	cytoplasm; recycling endosome; vesicle; cytosol; late endosome; Golgi apparatus; membrane; growth cone; ruffle; melanosome; insulin-responsive compartment; photoreceptor outer segment; peroxisome; secretory granule; microtubule plus-end; filopodium tip; soma; early endosome; endoplasmic reticulum; actin filament; neuron projection; lysosome; actomyosin; intermediate filament; extracellular exosome; myosin complex; unconventional myosin complex; smooth endoplasmic reticulum; postsynapse; glutamatergic synapse
Biological process	regulation of inositol 1,4,5-trisphosphate-sensitive calcium-release channel activity; melanin biosynthetic process; synapse organization; insulin secretion; secretory granule localization; melanosome localization; actin filament-based movement; post-Golgi vesicle-mediated transport; odontogenesis; endoplasmic reticulum localization; melanin metabolic process; regulation of Golgi organization; long-chain fatty acid biosynthetic process; melanosome transport; cellular response to insulin stimulus; vesicle transport along actin filament; protein transport; developmental pigmentation; myelination; pigmentation; protein localization to plasma membrane; melanocyte differentiation; locomotion involved in locomotory behavior; vesicle-mediated transport; visual perception; exocytosis; chemical synaptic transmission; hair follicle maturation; transport; establishment of endoplasmic reticulum localization to postsynapse; regulation of postsynaptic cytosolic calcium ion concentration
Sources:Amigo / QuickGO
Orthologs
Databases	NCBI: entry; OMA: entry
Species	Human	Mouse
Entrez	4644	17918
Ensembl	ENSG00000197535	ENSMUSG00000034593
UniProt	Q9Y4I1	Q99104
RefSeq (mRNA)	NM_000259; NM_001142495; NM_001382347; NM_001382348; NM_001382349	NM_010864
RefSeq (protein)	NP_000250; NP_001135967; NP_001369276; NP_001369277; NP_001369278	NP_034994
Location (UCSC)	Chr 15: 52.31 – 52.53 Mb	Chr 9: 74.98 – 75.13 Mb
PubMed search
- Wikidata
View/Edit Human	View/Edit Mouse

Unconventional myosin-Va is a motor protein that in humans is encoded by the gene MYO5A. This myosin is involved in the intracellular transport of vesicles, organelles and protein complexes along the actin filaments. In humans it is coded for by the MYO5A gene.

== Structure ==
In the presence of cargo adapters and calcium, unconventional myosin Va is present in an elongated and active state. It has an N-terminal head domain and a C-terminal tail domain. The actin-binding head (N-Terminal) is an ATP-dependent motor domain that transmits changes from the active site to the light chain lever arm. The C-terminal globular domain (GB) decides the Myosin class and moderate the cargo transport. Also, the GB interacts with other cargo specific proteins. Myosin Va is highly expressed in neurons and melanocytes.

== Interactions ==
MYO5A has been shown to interact with DYNLL1, RAB27A, DYNLL2, RPGRIP1L, and Rab3A.

== Clinical significance ==
- Defects in Myosin Va are associated with Griscelli syndrome type 1, also known as Elejalde syndrome a rare autosomal recessive disorder. This defect is due a mutation in which a premature stop codon in the globular tail disrupt melanosome transport producing partial albinism. Griscelli syndrome type 1 can present with pigment defects and neurological disorders such as, hypotonia, motor development delay and mental impairment.
- Myosin Va is highly expressed in the nervous system and it is present in almost the entire brain. MY5A perform an important role in the regulation of axonal vesicle transport on the neurofilaments. The GB of MYO5A can form a complex with Rab3A. The involvement of this complex is important for the synaptic vesicles (SVs) trafficking of neurotransmitters and the dynamics of the SVs on the actin filaments. The absence of MYO5A in the brain can be associated with loco motor dysfunction and neuroendocrine abnormalities. As mention MYO5A is highly expressed on the neurons. Therefore, a mutation on MYO5A can be related with abnormal neuronal development and the progression of neurodegeneration.
- MYO5A and MYO5B are involved with Kv1.5 (encoded by Potassium voltage-gated channel subfamily A member 5, KCNA5) in the myocytes. Kv1.5 is associated with the regulation of the action potential in the myocytes. New strategies targeting Kv1.5 current through MYO5A and MYO5B in human atrial fibrillation (AF) are being studied.

== See also ==
- Myosin
- MYP5B
