= Melanosome =

Organelle found in animal cells used for the synthesis, storage and transport of melanin

7× speed timelapse video of fish melanophores responding to 200 uM adrenaline; the melanosomes retreat to the center of the star-shaped melanophore cells.

Fish and frog melanophores are cells that can change colour by dispersing or aggregating pigment-containing melanosomes.

A melanosome is an organelle found in animal cells and is the site for synthesis, storage and transport of melanin, the most common light-absorbing pigment found in the animal kingdom. Melanosomes are responsible for color and photoprotection in animal cells and tissues.

Melanosomes are synthesised in the skin in melanocyte cells, as well as the eye in choroidal melanocytes and retinal pigment epithelial (RPE) cells. In lower vertebrates, they are found in melanophores or chromatophores.

== Structure ==
Melanosomes are relatively large organelles, measuring up to 500 nm in diameter. They are bound by a bilipid membrane and are, in general, rounded, sausage-like, or cigar-like in shape. They can also be hollow in birds and platypus. The shape is constant for a given species and cell type. They have a characteristic ultrastructure on electron microscopy, which varies according to the maturity of the melanosome, and for research purposes a numeric staging system is sometimes used.

Hollow melanosomes in birds enhance the brightness of iridescent colours in feather barbules by increasing the refractive index between keratin and melanin and between melanin and the air within the melanosome's cavity. Another factor which increases the range of colors produced is that melanosomes are often flattened and organized as nanostructures.

== Synthesis of melanin ==
Melanosomes are dependent for their pigment on certain enzymes, especially tyrosinase, that synthesise the large polymers of melanin within the cell. Before it generates sufficient pigment to be seen on light microscopy it is known as a pre-melanosome.

Dysfunction or absence of the melanin-synthesising enzymes (in conditions such as Chédiak–Higashi syndrome) leads to various patterns of albinism.

== Pseudopodia and tanning ==
In some melanocytes, the melanosomes remain static within the cell. In others the cell can extend its surface lengthwise as temporary projections known as pseudopodia, which carry melanosomes away from the center of the cell, thereby increasing the cell's effectiveness in absorbing light.

The pseudopodial process (aka the tanning process) happens slowly in dermal melanocytes in response to ultraviolet light and to production of new melanosomes and increased donation of melanosomes to adjacent keratinocytes, which are typical skin surface cells. Donation occurs when some keratinocytes engulf the end of the melanocyte pseudopodia, which contain many melanosomes. Cytoplasmic dynein will carry the vesicles containing the melanin to the center of the cell, which causes melanosomes to sequester the keratinocyte's nucleus, providing optimal protection from UV rays. These changes are responsible for tanning of human skin after exposure to UV light or sunlight.

== In animals ==
In many species of fish, amphibians, crustaceans, and reptiles, melanosomes can be highly mobile within the cell in response to hormonal (or sometimes neural) control, which leads to visible changes in colour that are used for behavioural signaling or photoprotection.

Melanosomes found in certain fish species contain pigments that control the color of the fish's scales. Molecular motors, when signaled, will either carry melanosomes containing pigments out to the periphery of the cell, or concentrate them at the center. The motor protein dynein is responsible for concentrating the melanosomes toward the center of the cell, or the "minus end" of microtubules. Conversely, the protein kinesin is responsible for dispersing the melanosomes to the periphery of the cell, and are plus end directed motors. Because the plus ends of microtubules are oriented towards the periphery, kinesin will carry melanosomes to the periphery. Dispersing melanosomes to the periphery causes the cell to appear darker; concentrating melanosomes towards the center will cause the cell to appear lighter color. This is how a photoprotective system works for the fish on a molecular level.

Recently, melanosomes were found in spiders as well.

The beautiful and rapid colour changes seen in many cephalopods such as octopuses and squid, are based on a different system, the chromatophore organ.

== In fossils ==
Recent (2008) discoveries by Xu Xing, a Chinese paleontologist, include fossilized feathers in rock formations dating from the Jurassic period (200 to 150 million years ago) to the late Paleogene and Neogene periods (66 to 2 million years ago). The feathers contain preserved residues of carbon that were previously thought to be traces of bacteria that decomposed feather tissues; however these (residues) are in fact microscopic organic imprints of fossilized melanosomes. Some of these structures still maintain an iridescent color typical of feather and fur tissues. It is conjectured that these microscopic structures could be further studied to reveal the original colors and textures of softer tissues in fossils. "The discovery of ultra-structural detail in feather fossils opens up remarkable possibilities for the investigation of other features in soft-bodied fossils, like fur and even internal organs," said Derek Briggs of the Yale University study team.

Melanosomes were used to discover the true colors of fossil Anchiornis huxleyi by a collaborative team including members from the Beijing Museum of Natural History, Peking University, Yale University, the Peabody Museum of Natural History, the University of Akron, and the University of Texas at Austin.

Melanosomes have also been found in fossils from Tupandactylus cf. imperator pterosaurs in the Lower Cretaceous Crato Formation, in the Araripe Basin, in Brazil.

== Templating ==
Melanosomes are believed to template melanin polymerization by way of amyloidogenesis of the protein Pmel17, which is present in abundant quantities in melanosomes.
