= Acral lentiginous melanoma =

Type of skin cancer

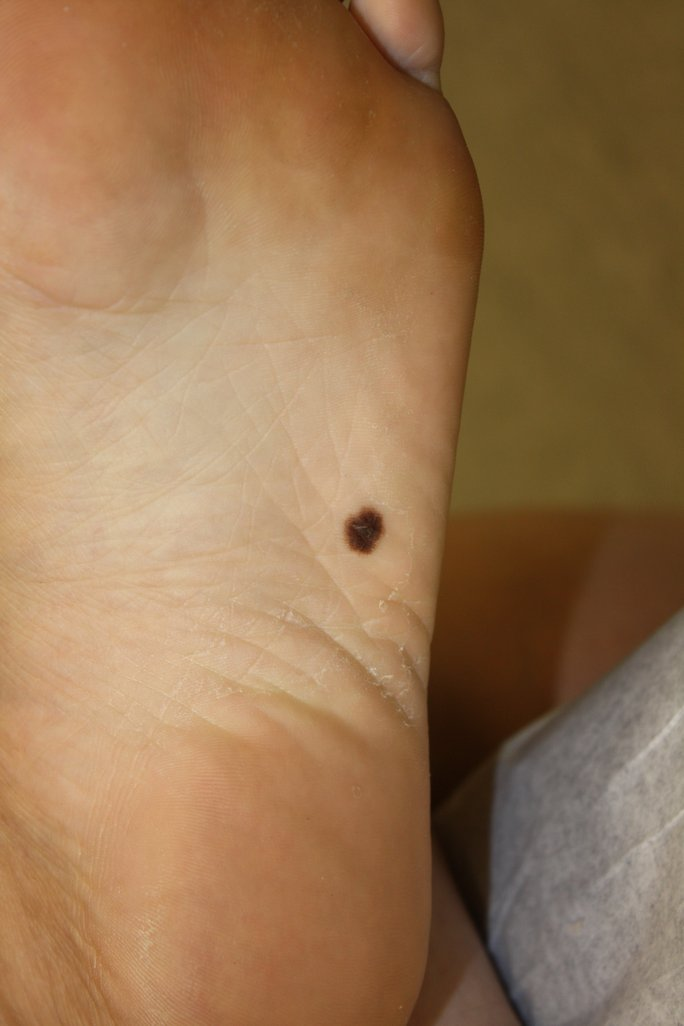
- Specialty: Oncology, dermatology
- Symptoms: Areas of dark pigmentation
- Causes: Malignant melanocytes
- Diagnostic method: Biopsy
- Treatment: Biologic immunotherapy agents
- Frequency: Males = Females

Acral lentiginous melanoma (ALM) is a type of skin cancer. It typically begins as a uniform brownish mark before becoming darker and wider with a blurred, irregular border. ALM is most frequently seen on the foot of a person with darker skin but can also be found in non-sun exposed areas such as the palms, soles, and under finger and toenails. It may become bumpy and ulcerate. When under the nail it typically appears as dark longitudinal streaks. As it grows, ALM may also spread to other areas of the body.

Melanoma is a group of serious skin cancers that arise from pigment cells (melanocytes); acral lentiginous melanoma is a kind of lentiginous skin melanoma. ALM makes up less than 5% of all melanomas, but is considered the most common subtype in people with darker skin and is rare in people with lighter skin types. It is not caused by exposure to sunlight or UV radiation, and wearing sunscreen does not protect against it. It occurs on non-hair-bearing surfaces of the body, which have not necessarily been exposed to sunlight. It is also found on mucous membranes.

== Signs and symptoms ==
Typical signs of acral lentiginous melanoma include the following

- Irregular area of pigmentation (usually dark brown or black) found on the palms, feet, or under the nail
- Longitudinal tan, black, or brown streak on a nail
- Pigmentation of proximal nail fold

Other uncommon presentations can include:

- Amelanotic or hypomelanotic areas that may be the same color or lighter than normal skin

Warning signs are new areas of pigmentation, or existing pigmentation that shows change. If caught early, ALM has a similar cure rate as the other types of superficial spreading melanoma. In contrast to cutaneous melanoma which utilizes the ABCDE rule (Asymmetry, Border, Color, Diameter, Evolving) to help identify lesions suspicious for skin cancer, an alternative mnemonic CUBED (Colored lesion, Uncertain diagnosis, Bleeding lesion, Enlargement of the lesion, Delay in healing) has been proposed for ALM based on the differences in signs and presentations between the two cancers.ALM can also cause other non-specific symptoms if it spreads to certain areas of the body:

- Enlarged lymph nodes (lymph nodes)
- Cough or shortness of breath (lungs)
- Headache (brain)
- Weight loss (gastrointestinal system)

== Causes ==
Acral lentiginous melanoma is a result of malignant melanocytes at the membrane of the skin (outer layers). The pathogenesis of ALM remains unclear, however injury or mechanical stress might play a role in its development. Unlike cutaneous melanoma, it is not caused by sunlight or UV radiation.

== Diagnosis ==
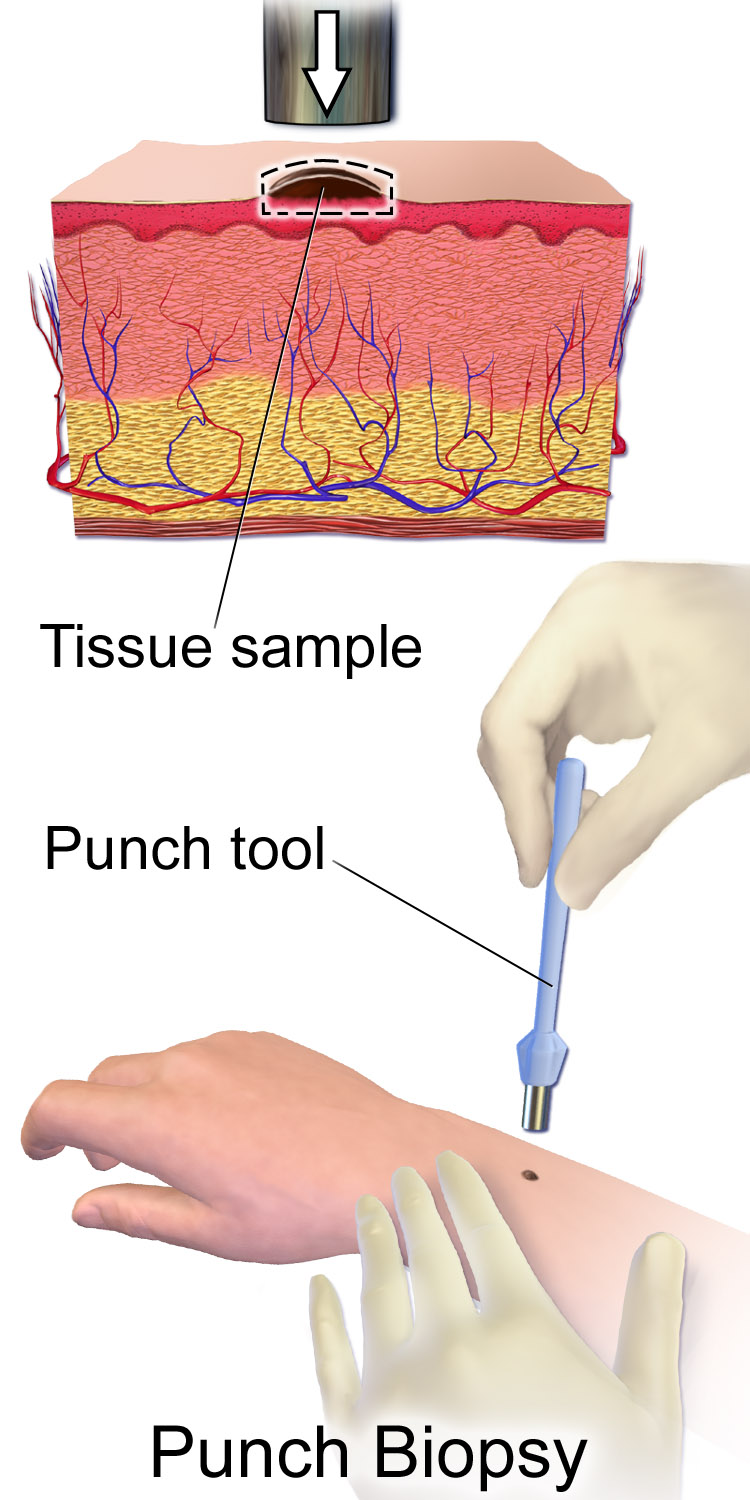
Graphic illustrating a punch biopsy

Although the ideal method of diagnosis of melanoma is complete excisional biopsy, alternative methods may be required based on the location of the melanoma. Dermatoscopy of acral pigmented lesions is very difficult but can be accomplished with diligent focus. Initial confirmation of the suspicion can be done with a small wedge biopsy or small punch biopsy. Thin deep wedge biopsies can heal very well on acral skin, and small punch biopsies may provide enough information to suggest if a lesion is cancerous. Once this confirmatory biopsy is done, a second complete excisional skin biopsy can be performed with a narrow surgical margin (1 mm). This second biopsy will determine the depth and invasiveness of the melanoma, and will help to guide further treatment if necessary. In order to establish the Breslow's depth of the lesion, the most raised section of the pigmented area should be sampled. If the melanoma involves the nail fold or the nail bed, complete excision of the nail unit might be required for accurate sampling.

In the event that the melanoma spreads to other sites such as the lymph nodes, another biopsy called the Sentinel lymph node biopsy may provide more information in terms of outcomes. More extensive melanomas may require wider excision (margins of 0.5 cm or more), digital amputation, lymphangiogram with lymph node dissection, or chemotherapy.

=== Histology ===
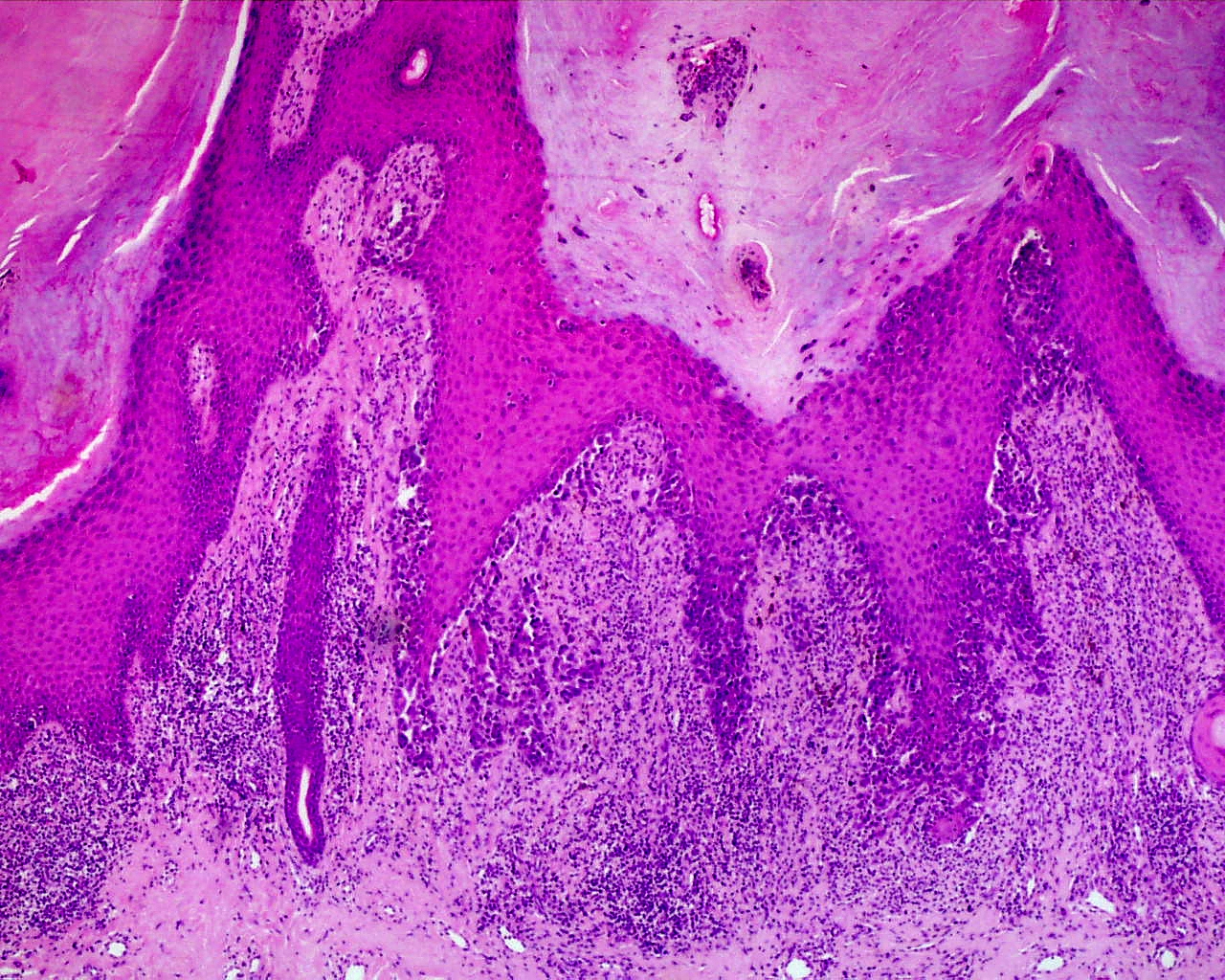
Acral lentiginous melanoma (ALM)

The main characteristic of acral lentiginous melanoma is continuous proliferation of atypical melanocytes at the dermoepidermal junction. Other histological signs of acral lentiginous melanoma include dermal invasion and desmoplasia. This invasion usually occurs many years after the initial lesion first appears.

According to Scolyer et al., ALM "is usually characterized in its earliest recognisable form as single atypical melanocytes scattered along the junctional epidermal layer".

=== Differential diagnoses ===
Other benign skin lesions that may mimic acral lentiginous melanoma include: Lentigo (sun spots), Acral Nevi (moles), or Onychomycosis (fungal infection of the nail). These skin lesions can appear as dark brown spots, like ALM, but can be distinguished on close examination or dermatoscopy. Other types of skin cancers like squamous cell carcinoma can also present similarly to ALM.

== Prevention ==
Since acral lentiginous melanoma is not linked to sun or UV exposure and the cause is not well-understood, there are no specific preventative measures. However, patient education can be geared towards populations in which ALM is more common to increase awareness of the warning signs of ALM and other melanomas to help with earlier detection. Early detection is one of the most important factors in disease-specific survival.

== Treatment ==
The mainstay of treatment of acral lentiginous melanoma is wide local excision. If metastatic, biologic immunotherapy agents like ipilimumab, pembrolizumab, and nivolumab; BRAF inhibitors, such as vemurafenib and dabrafenib; or a MEK inhibitor trametinib may be used.

When arising in the nailbed of a digit, the evidence suggests that digit-sparing surgery (wide excision and grafting) has similar outcomes to amputation, therefore, to preserve function and aesthetics it is recommended that clinicians default to digit-sparing surgery. Secondary amputation may be considered if the surgery margins are not clear of cancerous cells, or if patients develop a recurrence of the melanoma.

== Prognosis ==
The prognosis of acral lentiginous melanoma is based on multiple factors including sex, age, race, Breslow depth, staging, and sentinel lymph node positivity. Out of these factors, it is believed that sentinel lymph node positivity provides the strongest prediction of cancer recurrence and death. When compared to cutaneous malignant melanoma (CMM), ALM has a poorer prognosis in terms of survival rates. This poorer prognosis is thought to be related to the fact that ALM is usually diagnosed at a later stage than other skin cancers; which may be due to ALM occurring on areas of the body that are harder to notice, especially in the elderly population.

== Epidemiology ==
The absolute incidence of ALM is the same for people of all skin colors, and has not changed significantly for decades. However, because rates of other melanomas are low in non-white populations, ALM is the most common form of melanoma diagnosed amongst Asian and sub-Saharan African ethnic groups. The average age at diagnosis is between sixty and seventy years. Males and females are affected equally, but females tend to be diagnosed at earlier stages.

== Society and culture ==
Jamaican musician Bob Marley died of the condition in 1981, at age 36.

== See also ==
- List of cutaneous conditions
