= Wallace H. Clark Jr. =

American pathologist, cancer researcher (1924–1997)

- Born: May 16, 1924; LaGrange, Georgia
- Died: November 28, 1997 (age 74); Kennebunkport, Maine
- Occupations: Dermatologist and pathologist
- Known for: Research on melanomas

Wallace H. Clark Jr. (May 16, 1924 – November 28, 1997) was an American dermatologist and pathologist. He is best known for devising the "Clark's level", or Clark Level, system for classifying the seriousness of a melanoma skin cancer based on its microscopic appearance.

== Early life and education ==
Clark was born and raised in LaGrange, Georgia, as the son of the country doctor Wallace H. Clark Sr. (1889–1955) and Sue B. Clark (née Vaughan, 1897–1975). After graduating from The Citadel, he attended Tulane University, where he received a bachelor's degree in 1944 and an M.D. degree in 1947.

== Career ==
He stayed at Tulane as a faculty member until 1962. He was an assistant professor of pathology and chair of the department of dermatopathology at Harvard University and Massachusetts General Hospital from 1962 until 1969. He then moved to Temple University, where he was a professor of pathology until 1978, including four years as chair of the department. From 1978 until his retirement in 1991 he was on the faculty of the University of Pennsylvania School of Medicine as a professor of dermatology and pathology; he also founded and chaired the university's Pigmented Lesion Clinic. Post-retirement he became a visiting professor of pathology at Harvard. He conducted research, primarily at Beth Israel Hospital, until just a few days before his death in November 1997.

== Scientific contributions ==
While working at Harvard and Mass General during the 1960s he studied many melanomas. In 1966 he and the dermatologist Thomas B. Fitzpatrick created the first Pigmented Lesion Clinic in the United States. He went on to create Pigmented Lesion Clinics at Temple University and the University of Pennsylvania. He made several seminal contributions to the understanding of melanoma.

"Clark's Classification" of melanoma Together with Martin Mihm, Clark described histogenic types of melanoma which differ in their epidemiology, as well as their clinical and histological appearance. The four major categories of Lentigo Maligna Melanoma, Superficial Spreading Melanoma, Nodular Melanoma, and Acral Lentiginous Melanoma loosely correspond to more recent molecular classification of the disease.

"Clark's level" and melanoma prognosis Clark correlated the microscopic appearance of the tumor with careful followup of the progression of the tumor and the patient's outcome. From these studies he developed a five-part scale, based on the depth of penetration of the lesion from the epidermis into the dermis and down to the subcutaneous tissue, which can be used to predict the likely progression of the tumor and the prognosis for the patient. While largely superseded by other prognostic attributes, as of 2015 pathologists evaluating a melanoma still classify it according to its Clark's level, and treating physicians consider that information to choose the appropriate treatment. Clark and his colleagues also made seminal observations on the importance of mitotic rate and tumor infiltrating lymphocytes in primary melanomas as important prognostic variables.

Dysplastic nevi Together with Mark Greene, Margaret Tucker, and David Elder, Clark described atypical appearing moles associated with increased risk for developing melanoma and termed them dysplastic nevi.

Clark also helped to develop criteria for recognizing the early signs of a melanoma, important in promoting early diagnosis and treatment. He was a strong a proponent of patient education and gave many public lectures teaching people how to recognize the warning signs of a possible melanoma.

== Recognition ==
The May 1999 issue of the journal Human Pathology was dedicated to the memory of Dr. Clark. The University of Pennsylvania School of Medicine hosts an annual Wallace H. Clark Jr., MD, Lectureship in Cutaneous Oncology as a living memorial to Clark, describing him as a "caring and expert physician, an imaginative and rigorous investigator, and a charismatic and provocative teacher," whose "recognition of what makes people susceptible to melanoma and the appearance of early, highly curable forms of melanoma has saved countless lives."

== Personal ==
He was married to Patricia Clark. He had two sons and four daughters. He died of a ruptured aneurysm on November 28, 1997, at his home in Kennebunkport, Maine, at the age of 74.

== Selected publications ==
- Fitzpatrick TB & Clark WH Jr. "Problems in the diagnosis of malignant melanoma". Tumors of the skin (The University of Texas M.D. Anderson Hospital and Tumor Institute. Seventh Annual Clinical Conference on Cancer, 1962). Year Book Medical Publishers, Inc. Chicago (1963) pp. 169–83.
- Clark WH Jr., From L, Bernardino EA & Mihm MC Jr. "The histogenesis and biologic behavior of primary human malignant melanoma of the skin". Cancer Res (1969) 29: 705–27.
- Clark, Wallace H. (ed.), Human Malignant Melanoma, Grune & Stratton, Inc., 1979, ISBN 978-0808911104.
- Clark WH Jr. "From the Melanocyte to Melanoma to Tumor Biology". Adv Cancer Res (1994) 65:113–40.
