= Acral nevus =

- Other names: Melanocytic nevus of acral skin, and Melanocytic nevus with intraepidermal ascent of cells
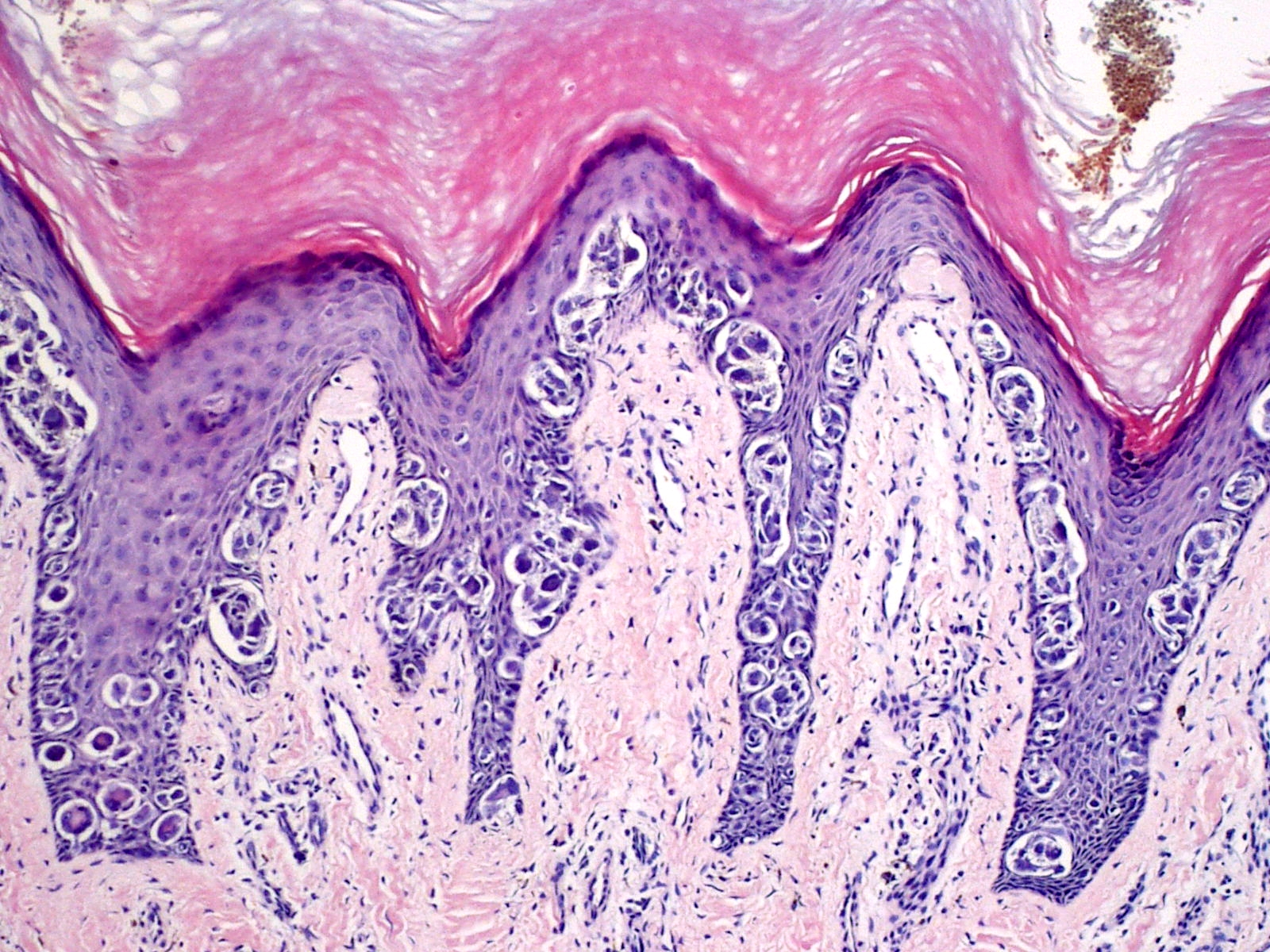
- Acral nevus
- Specialty: Dermatology

An acral nevus is a cutaneous condition of the palms, soles, fingers, or toes (peripheral body parts), characterized by a skin lesion that is usually macular or only slightly elevated, and may display a uniform brown or dark brown color, often with linear striations.

Acral nevi may occur in all ethnic groups, but are more common in dark-skinned people. The acral nevus is a benign skin lesion that can occur at any age, but is generally noticed between 10 and 30 years of age. Both children and adults may be observed with this skin lesion. The prevalence of acral nevi increases directly with degree of skin pigmentation. In a study, palmar or plantar nevi were detected in 42.0% of black (50 of 119) vs 23.0% of whites (79 of 343). Palmar or plantar nevi of 6 mm diameter or larger were detected in 3.4% of blacks (4 of 119) vs 0.6% of whites.

== Additional image ==
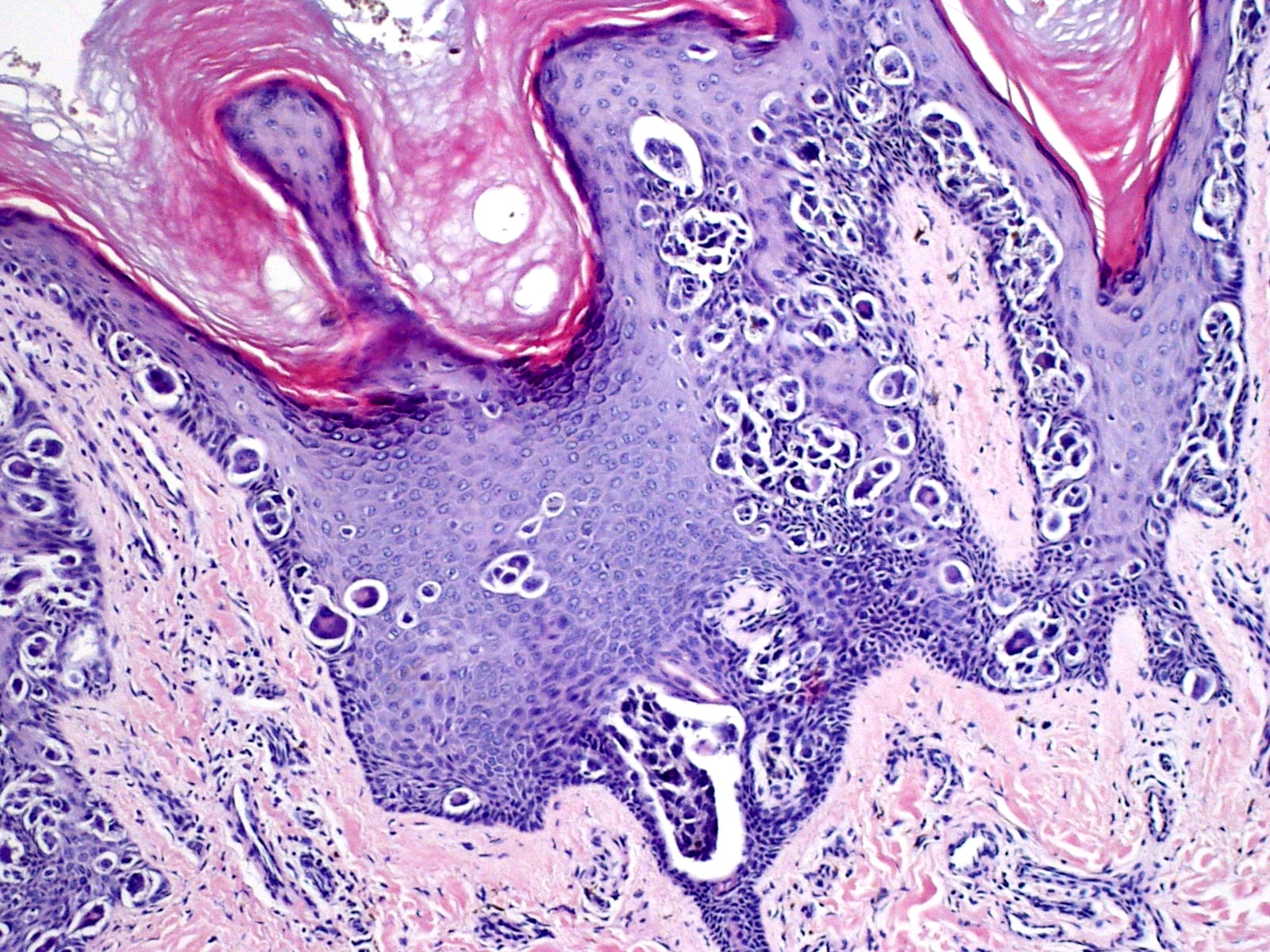
Melanocytic acral nevus with intraepidermal ascent cells (MANIAC)

== See also ==
- Acral lentiginous melanoma
- List of cutaneous conditions
