= Superficial spreading melanoma =

- Other names: Superficially spreading melanoma
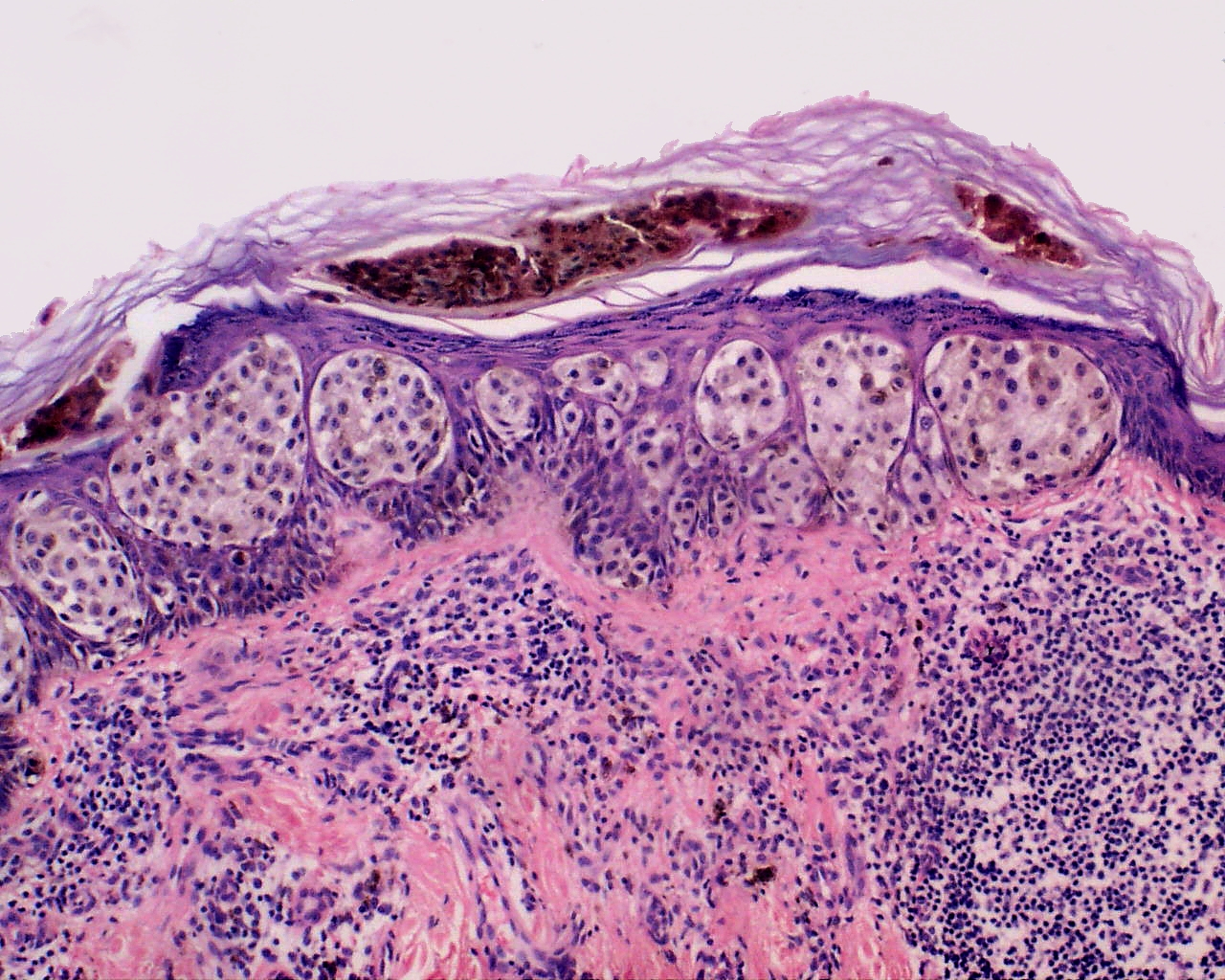
- Specialty: Dermatology

Superficial spreading melanoma (SSM) is a type of skin cancer that typically starts as an irregularly edged dark spot typically on sun-exposed part of the body. The colour may be variable with dark, light and reddish shades; occasionally no color at all. It typically grows in diameter before spreading to deeper tissue, forming a bump or becoming an ulcer. Itching, bleeding and crust formation may occur in some. The backs and shoulders of males and legs of women are particularly prone.

It is a type of melanocytic tumor occurring in intermittently sun-exposed skin. The cause is associated with repeated sunburns in childhood, intermittent exposure to sun during life, and sun bed use.

Two-thirds of cases occur in light skin, and it is less common in dark skin.

The average age at diagnosis is in the fifth decade.

== Signs and symptoms ==
Often, this disease evolves from a precursor lesion, usually a dysplastic nevus. Otherwise it arises in previously normal skin. A prolonged radial growth phase, where the lesion remains thin, may eventually be followed by a vertical growth phase where the lesion becomes thick and nodular. As the risk of spread varies with the thickness, early SSM is more frequently cured than late nodular melanoma.

== Histopathology ==
The microscopic hallmarks are:

- Large melanocytic cells with nest formation along the dermo-epidermal junction.
- Invasion of the upper epidermis in a pagetoid fashion (discohesive single cell growth).
- The pattern of rete ridges is often effaced.
- Invasion of the dermis by atypical, pleomorphic melanocytes
- Absence of the 'maturation' typical of naevus cells
- Mitoses

== Treatment ==
Treatment is by excisional biopsy, wide local excision and possibly sentinel node biopsy. Localized melanoma, which has not spread beyond the skin, has a very good prognosis with low recurrence rates. Spread of disease to local lymph nodes or distant sites (typically brain, bone, skin and lung) marks a decidedly poor prognosis.

== See also ==
- Melanoma
- List of cutaneous conditions
