= Melanoma =

Skin cancer originating in melanocytes

- Other names: Malignant melanoma
- Pronunciation: /ˌmɛləˈnoʊmə/
- Specialty: Oncology and dermatology
- Symptoms: Mole that is increasing in size, has irregular edges, change in color, itchiness, or skin breakdown.
- Causes: Ultraviolet light (Sun, tanning devices)
- Risk factors: Family history, many moles, poor immune function
- Diagnostic method: Tissue biopsy
- Differential diagnosis: Seborrheic keratosis, lentigo, blue nevus, dermatofibroma
- Prevention: Sunscreen, avoiding UV light
- Treatment: Surgery
- Prognosis: Five-year survival rates 100% (localized), 35% (disseminated) in the US (2015–2021)
- Frequency: 3.1 million (2015)
- Deaths: 59,800 (2015)

Melanoma is a type of cancer, typically skin cancer; it develops from the melanin-producing cells known as melanocytes. It typically occurs in the skin, but may rarely occur in the mouth, intestines, or eye (uveal melanoma). In very rare cases melanoma can also happen in the lung, which is known as primary pulmonary melanoma and only happens in 0.01% of primary lung tumors.

In females, melanomas most commonly occur on the legs; while in males, on the back. Melanoma is frequently referred to as malignant melanoma. However, the medical community stresses that there is no such thing as a 'benign melanoma' and recommends that the term 'malignant melanoma' should be avoided as it is redundant.

About 30% of melanomas develop from moles. Changes in a mole that can indicate melanoma include increase—especially rapid increase—in size, irregular edges, change in color, itchiness, or skin breakdown.

The primary cause of melanoma is ultraviolet light (UV) exposure in those with low levels of the skin pigment melanin. The UV light may be from the sun or other sources, such as tanning devices. Those with many moles, a history of affected family members, and poor immune function are at greater risk. A number of rare genetic conditions, such as xeroderma pigmentosum, also increase the risk. Diagnosis is by biopsy and analysis of any skin lesion that has signs of being potentially cancerous.

Avoiding UV light and using sunscreen in UV-bright sun conditions may prevent melanoma. Treatment typically is removal by surgery of the melanoma and the potentially affected adjacent tissue bordering the melanoma. In those with slightly larger cancers, nearby lymph nodes may be tested for spread (metastasis). Most people are cured if metastasis has not occurred. For those in whom melanoma has spread, immunotherapy, biologic therapy, radiation therapy, or chemotherapy may improve survival. With treatment, the five-year survival rates in the United States are 100% among those with localized disease, 76% when the disease has spread to lymph nodes, and 35% among those with distant spread. The likelihood that melanoma will reoccur or spread depends on its thickness, how fast the cells are dividing, and whether or not the overlying skin has broken down.

Melanoma is the most dangerous type of skin cancer. In 2015, 3.1 million people had active disease, which resulted in 59,800 deaths. The incidence of melanoma is expected to increase from 331,722 worldwide cases in 2022 to 510,000 cases in 2040. However mortality is decreasing as newer treatments become available. About 80% of all global cases occur in adults 50 years or older. Australia and New Zealand have the highest rates of melanoma in the world. High rates also occur in Northern Europe and North America, while it is less common in Asia, Africa, and Latin America. In the United States, melanoma occurs about 1.6 times more often in men than women. Melanoma has become more common since the 1960s in areas mostly populated by people of European descent.

== Signs and symptoms ==
Early signs of melanoma are changes to the shape or color of existing moles or, in the case of nodular melanoma, the appearance of a new lump anywhere on the skin. At later stages, the mole may itch, ulcerate, or bleed. Early signs of melanoma are summarized by the mnemonic "ABCDEEFG":

- Asymmetry
- Borders (irregular with edges and corners)
- Colour (variegated)
- Diameter (greater than 6 mm (0.24 in), about the size of a pencil eraser)
- Evolving over time

This classification does not apply to nodular melanoma, which has its own classifications:

- Elevated above the skin surface
- Firm to the touch
- Growing

Metastatic melanoma may cause nonspecific paraneoplastic symptoms, including loss of appetite, nausea, vomiting, and fatigue. Brain metastases are particularly common in patients with metastatic melanoma. Other common sites of metastasis of melanoma include liver, intestines, bone, lungs and distant lymph nodes.

== Cause ==
Melanomas are typically caused by DNA damage resulting from exposure to UV light from the sun. Genetics also play a role. Melanoma can also occur in skin areas with little sun exposure (i.e., mouth, soles of feet, palms of hands, genital areas). People with dysplastic nevus syndrome, also known as familial atypical multiple mole melanoma, are at increased risk for the development of melanoma.

Having more than 50 moles indicates an increased risk of melanoma. A weakened immune system makes cancer development easier due to the body's weakened ability to fight cancer cells.

=== UV radiation ===
The main risk factor for melanoma formation is exposure to UV radiation, either from sunlight or indoor tanning. UV radiation exposure from tanning beds increases the risk of melanoma. The International Agency for Research on Cancer finds that tanning beds are "carcinogenic to humans" and that people who begin using tanning devices before the age of thirty years are 75% more likely to develop melanoma.

Those who work in airplanes also appear to have an increased risk, believed to be due to greater exposure to UV.

UVB light, emanating from the sun at wavelengths between 315 and 280 nm, is absorbed directly by DNA in skin cells, which results in a type of direct DNA damage called cyclobutane pyrimidine dimers. Thymine, cytosine, or cytosine-thymine dimers are formed by the joining of two adjacent pyrimidine bases within a strand of DNA. UVA light presents at wavelengths longer than UVB (between 400 and 315 nm); and it can also be absorbed directly by DNA in skin cells, but at lower efficiencies—about 1/100 to 1/1000 of UVB.

Radiation exposure (UVA and UVB) is a major contributor to the development of melanoma. Occasional extreme sun exposure that results in "sunburn" on areas of the human body is causally related to melanoma. The risk appears to be strongly influenced by socioeconomic conditions rather than indoor versus outdoor occupations; it is more common in professional and administrative workers than in unskilled workers. Other factors are mutations in (or total loss of) tumor suppressor genes.

Possible significant elements in determining risk include the intensity and duration of sun exposure, the age at which sun exposure occurs, and the degree of skin pigmentation. Melanoma rates tend to be highest in countries settled by migrants from Europe, which have a large amount of direct, intense sunlight to which the skin of the settlers is not adapted, most notably Australia. Exposure during childhood is a more important risk factor than exposure in adulthood. This is seen in migration studies in Australia.

Incurring multiple severe sunburns increases the likelihood that future sunburns develop into melanoma due to cumulative damage. Living close to the equator increases exposure to UV radiation.

=== Genetics ===
It is believed that 5-12% of melanoma is hereditary. Having a family history of melanoma increases one's risk, with having a first-degree relative increasing one's risk of developing melanoma by 1.74 times. Having a personal history of melanoma increases the risk of developing another melanoma in the future, by some estimates an 8.40 times increased risk. Familial melanoma is more likely to present at an earlier age and more likely to present as multiple skin lesions than non-familial melanoma. Familial melanoma is also more likely to present as thinner lesions (less depth of skin invasion.

A number of rare mutations, which often run in families, greatly increase melanoma susceptibility. Several genes increase risks. Some rare genes have a relatively high risk of causing melanoma; some more common genes, such as a gene called MC1R that causes red hair, have an elevated risk. Genetic testing can be used to search for the mutations. Melanoma with genetic mutations in the BRAF genes V600E or V600K (proteins involved in cell growth) are more responsive to therapy with the BRAF inhibitor dabrafenib plus trametinib.

One class of mutations affects the gene CDKN2A. An alternative reading frame mutation in this gene leads to the destabilization of p53, a transcription factor involved in apoptosis and in 50% of human cancers. Another mutation in the same gene results in a nonfunctional inhibitor of CDK4, a cyclin-dependent kinase that promotes cell division. Mutations that cause the skin condition xeroderma pigmentosum (XP) also increase melanoma susceptibility. Scattered throughout the genome, XP mutations reduce a cell's ability to repair DNA. Both CDKN2A and XP mutations are highly penetrant (the chances of a carrier expressing the phenotype are high).

Familial melanoma is genetically heterogeneous, and loci for familial melanoma appear on the chromosome arms 1p, 9p and 12q. Multiple genetic events have been related to melanoma's pathogenesis (disease development). The multiple tumor suppressor 1 (CDKN2A/MTS1) gene encodes p16INK4a – a low-molecular weight protein inhibitor of cyclin-dependent protein kinases (CDKs) – which has been localised to the p21 region of human chromosome 9.

Dysplastic nevus syndrome also known as FAMMM (familial atypical multiple mole-melanoma) is typically characterized by having 50 or more combined moles in addition to a family history of melanoma. It is transmitted autosomal dominantly and mostly associated with the CDKN2A mutations. People who have a CDKN2A mutation associated with FAMMM have a 38-fold increased risk of pancreatic cancer. People with FAMMM also have a 30% lifetime risk of developing melanoma.

People with mutations in the MC1R gene are two to 2.7-3.6 times more likely to develop melanoma than those with two wild-type (typical unaffected type) copies. Some MC1R gene variants are more common in those with red hair. Mutation of the MDM2 SNP309 gene is associated with increased risks for younger women.

Fair and red-haired people, persons with multiple atypical nevi or dysplastic nevi, and persons born with giant congenital melanocytic nevi are at increased risk. Fair skin is the result of having less melanin in the skin, which means less protection from UV radiation exists.

== Pathophysiology ==
Where melanoma is most likely to develop

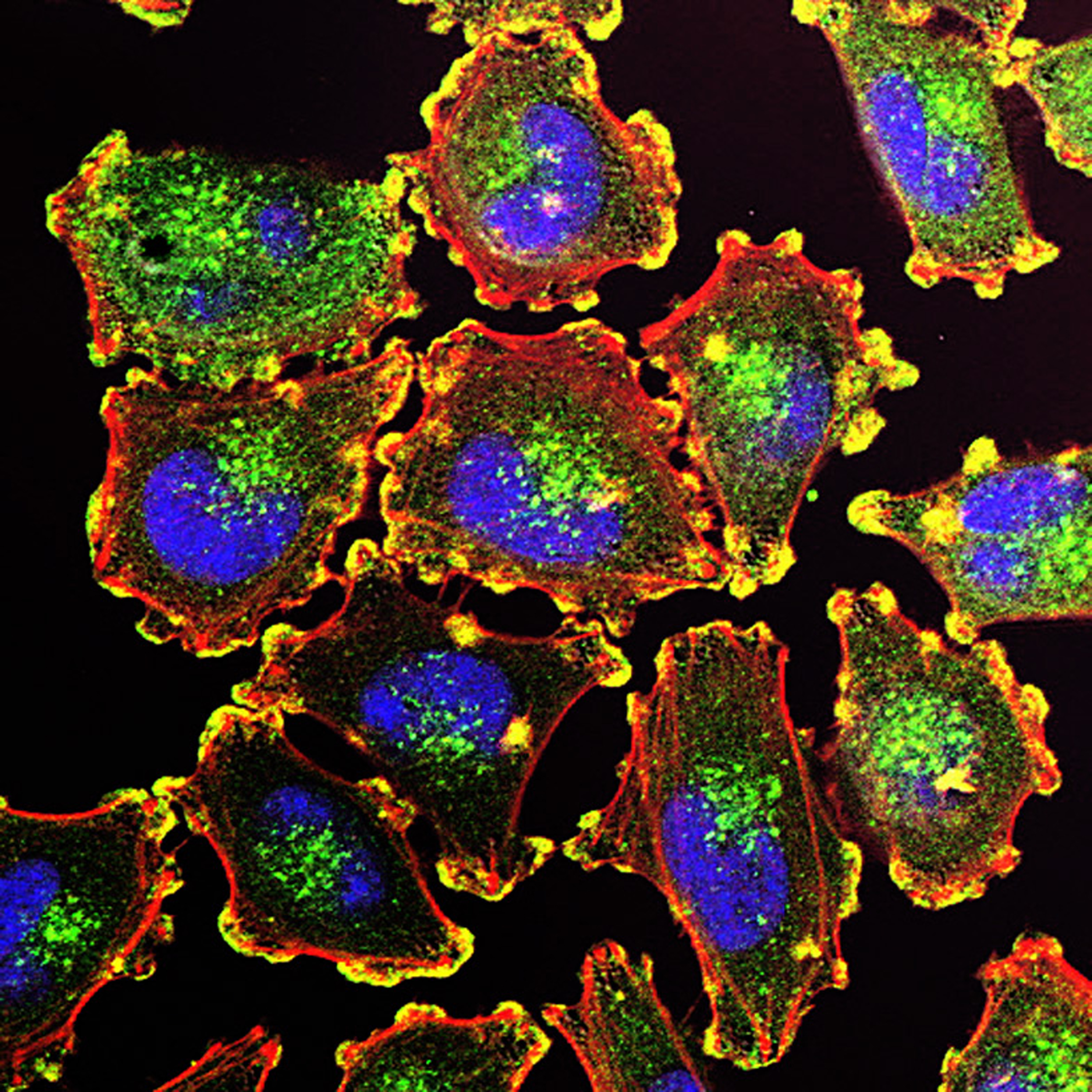
Molecular basis for melanoma cell motility: actin-rich podosomes (yellow), along with cell nuclei (blue), actin (red), and an actin regulator (green)

The earliest stage of melanoma starts when melanocytes begin out-of-control growth. Melanocytes are found between the outer layer of the skin (the epidermis) and the next layer (the dermis). This early stage of the disease is called the radial growth phase, when the tumor is less than 1 mm thick, and spreads at the level of the basal epidermis. Because the cancer cells have not yet reached the blood vessels deeper in the skin, it is very unlikely that this early-stage melanoma will spread to other parts of the body. If the melanoma is detected at this stage, then it can usually be completely removed with surgery.

When the tumor cells start to move in a different direction – vertically up into the epidermis and into the papillary dermis – cell behaviour changes dramatically.

The next step in the evolution is the radial growth phase, in which the tumor expands laterally. The Breslow's depth of the lesion is usually less than 1 mm (0.04 in), while the Clark level is usually 2.

The vertical growth phase (VGP) following invasive melanoma. The tumor becomes able to metastasize, or grow into the surrounding tissue, and can spread around the body through blood or lymph vessels. The tumor thickness is usually more than 1 mm (0.04 in), and the tumor involves the deeper parts of the dermis.

The host elicits an immunological reaction against the tumor during the VGP, which is judged by the presence and activity of the tumor infiltrating lymphocytes (TILs). These cells sometimes completely destroy the primary tumor; this is called regression, which is the latest stage of development. In certain cases, the primary tumor is completely destroyed and only the metastatic tumor is discovered. About 40% of human melanomas contain activating mutations affecting the structure of the B-Raf protein, resulting in constitutive signaling through the Raf to MAP kinase pathway.

A cause common to most cancers is damage to DNA. UVA light mainly causes thymine dimers. UVA also produces reactive oxygen species and these inflict other DNA damage, primarily single-strand breaks, oxidized pyrimidines and the oxidized purine 8-oxoguanine (a mutagenic DNA change) at 1/10, 1/10, and 1/3rd the frequencies of UVA-induced thymine dimers, respectively.

If unrepaired, cyclobutane pyrimidine dimer (CPD) photoproducts can lead to mutations by inaccurate translesion synthesis during DNA replication or repair. The most frequent mutations due to inaccurate synthesis past CPDs are cytosine to thymine (C>T) or CC>TT transition mutations. These are commonly referred to as UV fingerprint mutations, as they are the most specific mutation caused by UV, being frequently found in sun-exposed skin, but rarely found in internal organs. Errors in DNA repair of UV photoproducts, or inaccurate synthesis past these photoproducts, can also lead to deletions, insertions, and chromosomal translocations.

The entire genomes of 25 melanomas were sequenced. On average, about 80,000 mutated bases (mostly C>T transitions) and about 100 structural rearrangements were found per melanoma genome. This is much higher than the roughly 70 mutations across generations (parent to child). Among the 25 melanomas, about 6,000 protein-coding genes had missense, nonsense, or splice site mutations. The transcriptomes of over 100 melanomas has also been sequenced and analyzed. Almost 70% of all human protein-coding genes are expressed in melanoma. Most of these genes are also expressed in other normal and cancer tissues, with some 200 genes showing a more specific expression pattern in melanoma compared to other forms of cancer. Examples of melanoma specific genes are tyrosinase, MLANA, and PMEL.

UV radiation causes damage to the DNA of cells, typically thymine dimerization, which, when unrepaired, can create mutations in the cell's genes. This strong mutagenic factor makes cutaneous melanoma the tumor type with the highest number of mutations. When the cell divides, these mutations are propagated to new generations of cells. If the mutations occur in protooncogenes or tumor suppressor genes, the rate of mitosis in the mutation-bearing cells can become uncontrolled, leading to the formation of a tumor. Data from patients suggest that aberrant levels of activating transcription factor in the nucleus of melanoma cells are associated with increased metastatic activity of melanoma cells; studies from mice on skin cancer tend to confirm a role for activating transcription factor-2 in cancer progression.

Cancer stem cells may also be involved.

=== Gene mutations ===
Large-scale studies, such as The Cancer Genome Atlas, have characterized recurrent somatic alterations likely driving initiation and development of cutaneous melanoma. The Cancer Genome Atlas study has established four subtypes: BRAF mutant, RAS mutant, NF1 mutant, and triple wild-type.

The most frequent mutation occurs in the 600th codon of BRAF (50% of cases). BRAF is normally involved in cell growth, and this specific mutation renders the protein constitutively active and independent of normal physiological regulation, thus fostering tumor growth. RAS genes (NRAS, HRAS and KRAS) are also recurrently mutated (30% of TCGA cases) and mutations in the 61st or 12th codons trigger oncogenic activity. Loss-of-function mutations often affect tumor suppressor genes such as NF1, TP53 and CDKN2A. Other oncogenic alterations include fusions involving various kinases such as BRAF, RAF1, ALK, RET, ROS1, NTRK1., NTRK3 and MET BRAF, RAS, and NF1 mutations and kinase fusions are remarkably mutually exclusive, as they occur in different subsets of patients. Assessment of mutation status can, therefore, improve patient stratification and inform targeted therapy with specific inhibitors.

In some cases (3–7%), mutated versions of BRAF and NRAS undergo copy-number amplification.

=== Metastasis ===
The research done by Sarna's team proved that heavily pigmented melanoma cells have Young's modulus about 4.93, while in non-pigmented ones it was only 0.98. In another experiment they found that elasticity of melanoma cells is important for its metastasis and growth: non-pigmented tumors were bigger than pigmented and it was much easier for them to spread. They showed that there are both pigmented and non-pigmented cells in melanoma tumors, so that they can both be drug-resistant and metastatic.

== Diagnosis ==
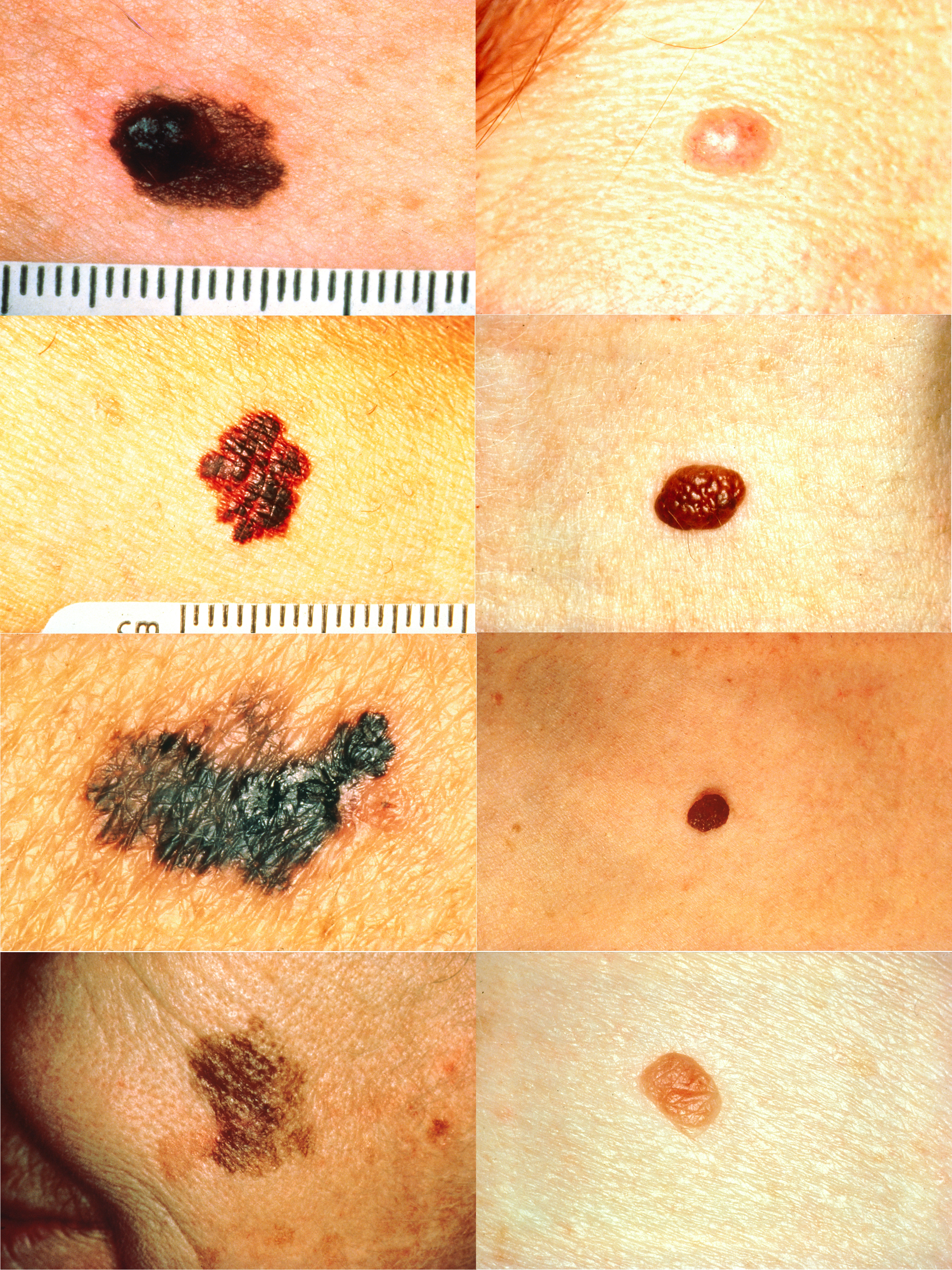
ABCD rule illustration: On the left side from top to bottom: melanomas showing (A) Asymmetry, (B) a border that is uneven, ragged, or notched, (C) coloring of different shades of brown, black, or tan and (D) diameter that had changed in size. The normal moles on the right side do not have abnormal characteristics (no asymmetry, even border, even color, no change in diameter).

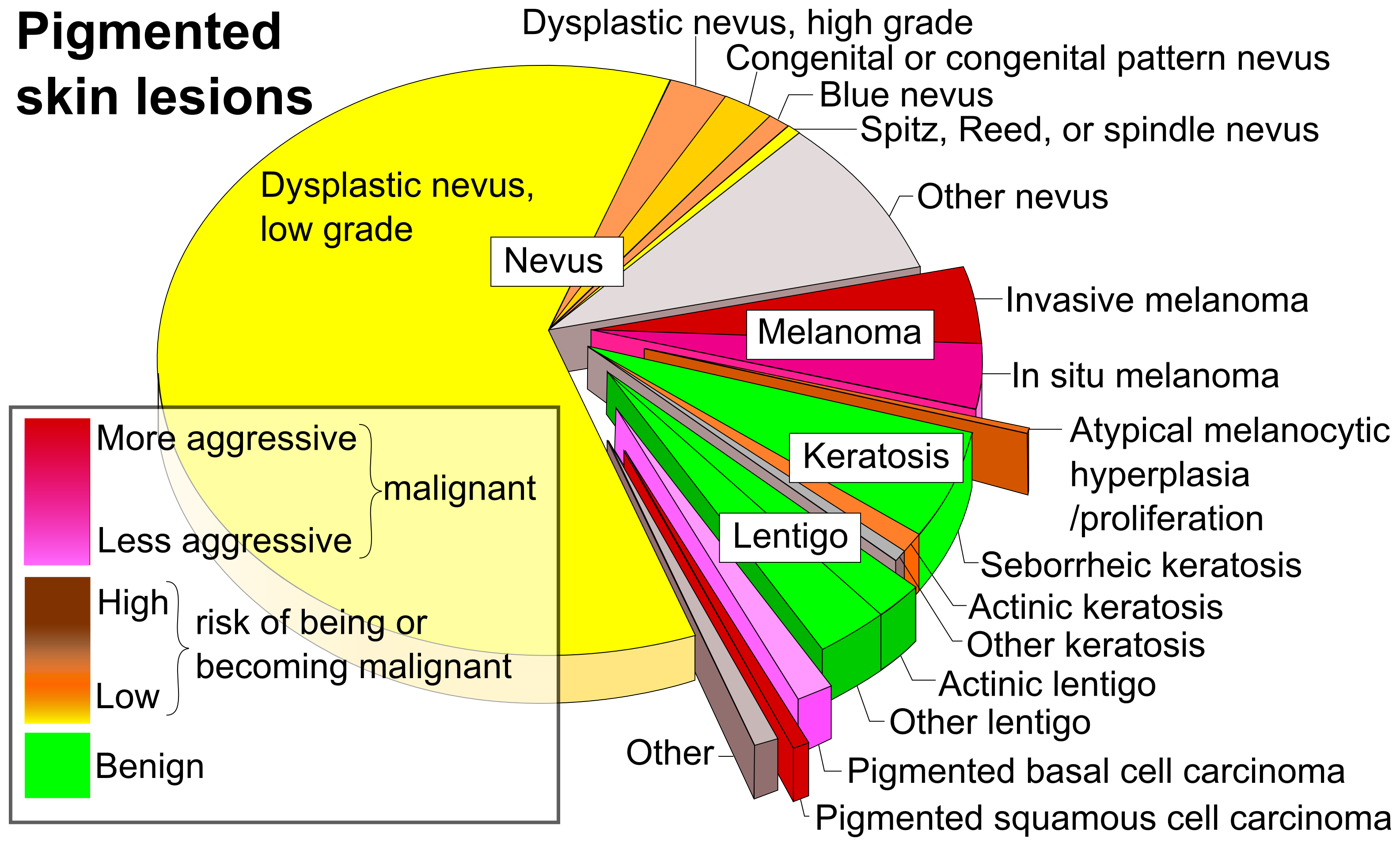
Various differential diagnoses of pigmented skin lesions, by relative rates upon biopsy and malignancy potential, including "melanoma" at right

Visually inspecting the skin lesion in question is the first step in diagnosing a suspected a melanoma. Moles that are irregular in color or shape are suspicious for melanoma. To detect melanomas, it is recommended to learn to recognize them (see "ABCDE" mnemonic), to regularly examine moles for changes (shape, size, color, itching or bleeding) and to consult a qualified physician when a suspicious skin lesion appears. In-person inspection of suspicious skin lesions is more accurate than visual inspection of images.

When used by trained specialists, dermoscopy is more helpful to identify malignant lesions than use of the naked eye alone. Reflectance confocal microscopy may have better sensitivity and specificity than dermoscopy in diagnosing cutaneous melanoma but more studies are needed to confirm this result.

Many melanomas present as lesions smaller than 6 mm in diameter. Physicians typically examine all moles, including those less than 6 mm in diameter. Seborrheic keratosis may meet some or all of the ABCD criteria and may be sometimes mistaken for melanoma. Doctors can generally distinguish seborrheic keratosis from melanoma upon examination or with dermatoscopy.

Total body photography, which involves photographic documentation of as much body surface as possible, is sometimes used to objectively observe the evolution of body moles over time, to potentially find moles that become suspicious. It is often used during follow-up for high-risk patients. The technique has been reported to enable early detection and provide a cost-effective approach, but its efficacy has been questioned due to its inability to detect microscopic changes.

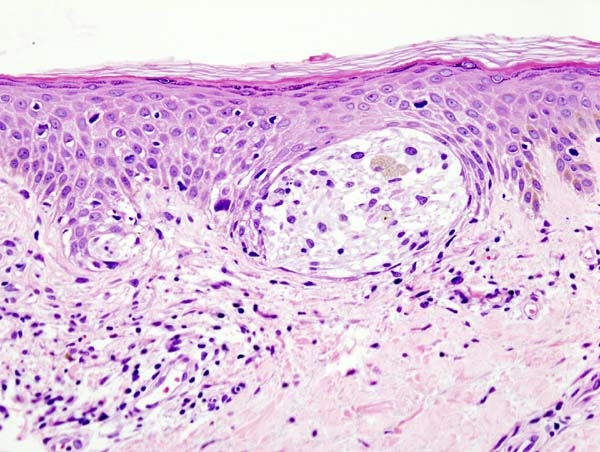
Melanoma in skin biopsy with H&E stain – this case may represent superficial spreading melanoma.

Lymph node with almost complete replacement by metastatic melanoma. The brown pigment is a focal deposition of melanin.

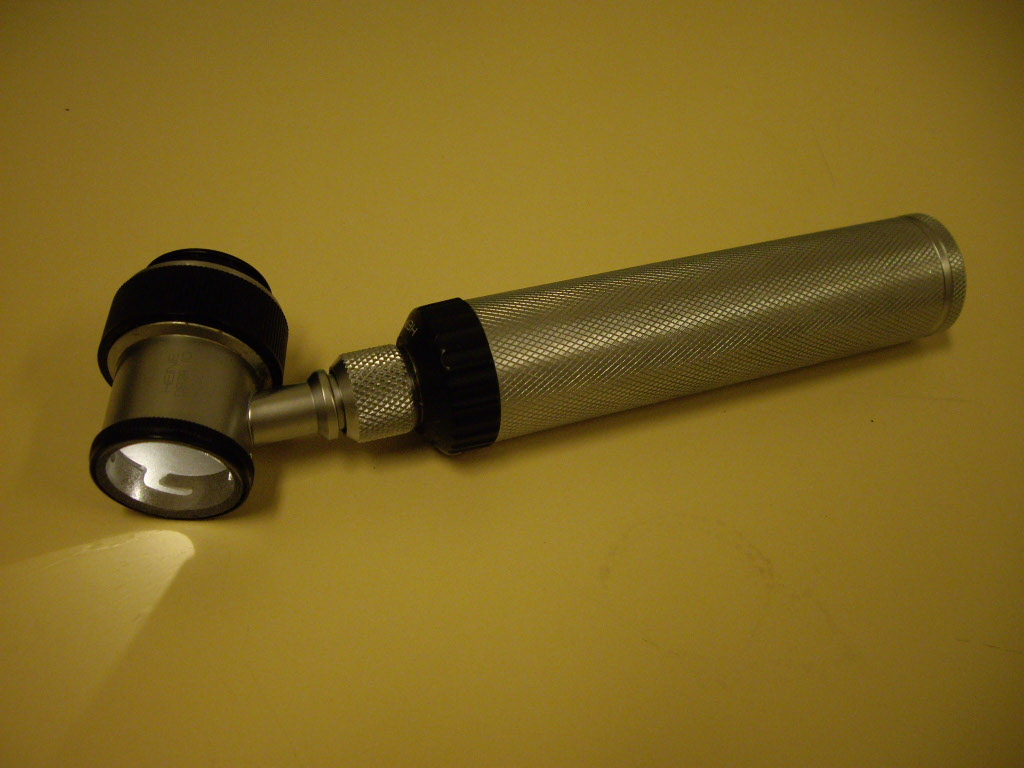
A dermatoscope

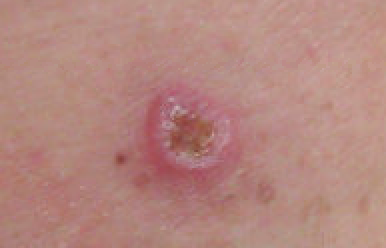
Melanoma, right posterior thigh

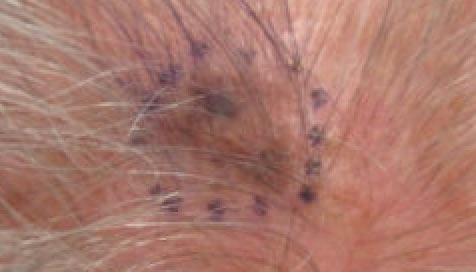
Melanoma in situ, vertex scalp marked for biopsy

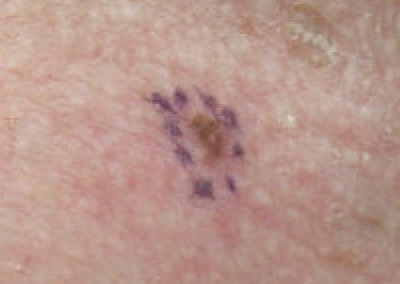
Melanoma in situ, evolving, right clavicle marked for biopsy

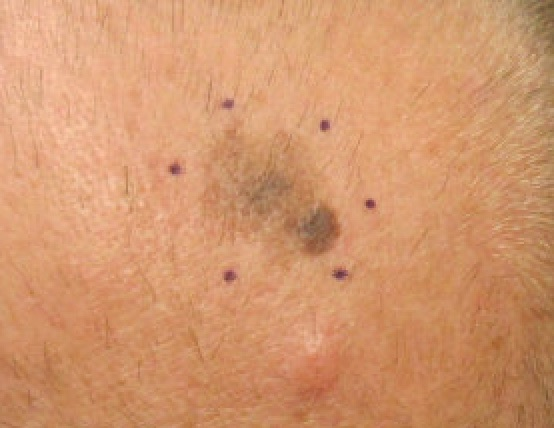
Melanoma, vertex scalp marked for biopsy

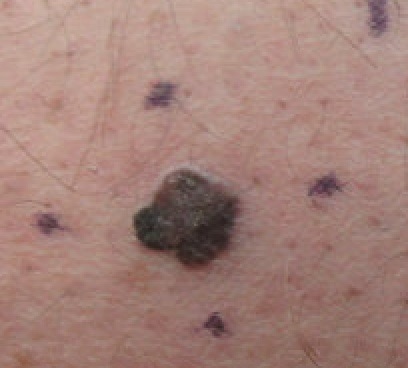
Melanoma, right medial thigh marked for biopsy

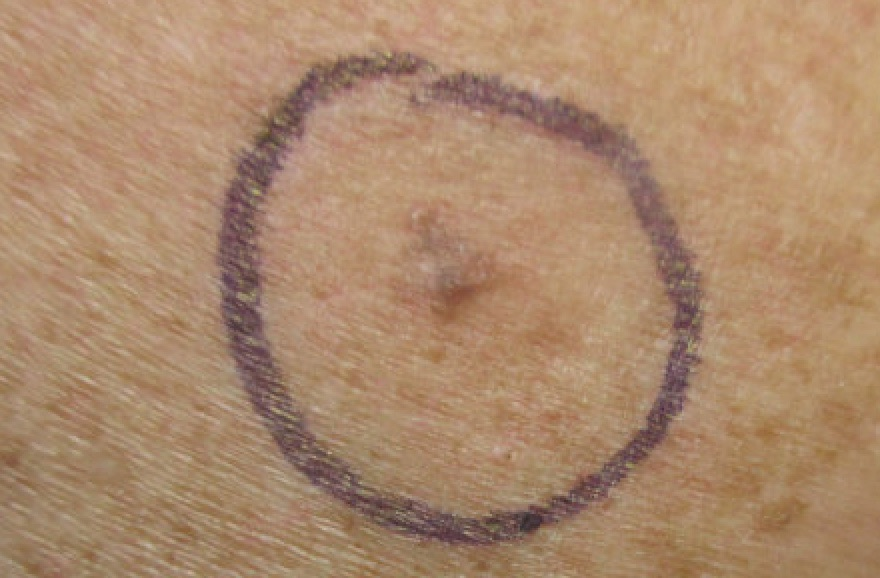
Melanoma, right posterior shoulder circled for biopsy

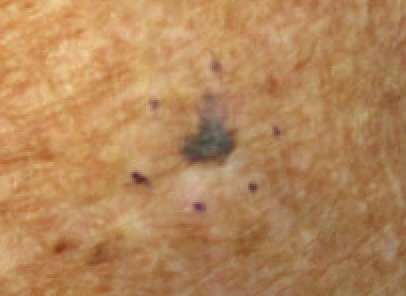
Melanoma, left forearm marked for biopsy

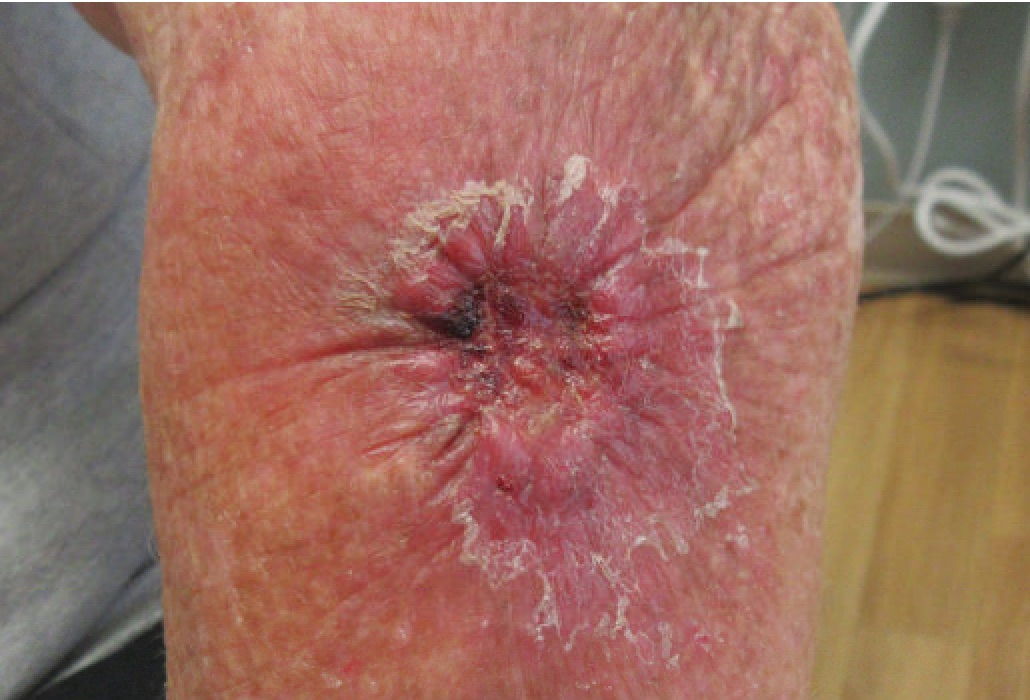
Melanoma left forearm post excision with purse-string closure

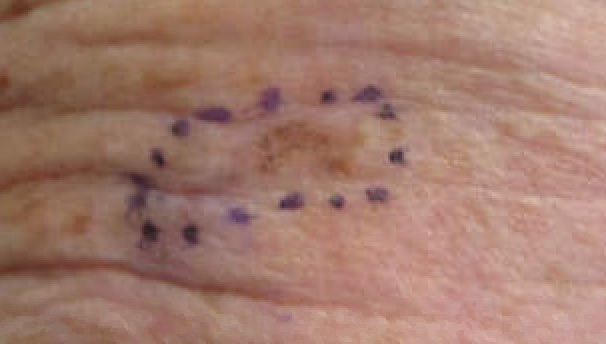
Melanoma in situ, right forehead marked for biopsy

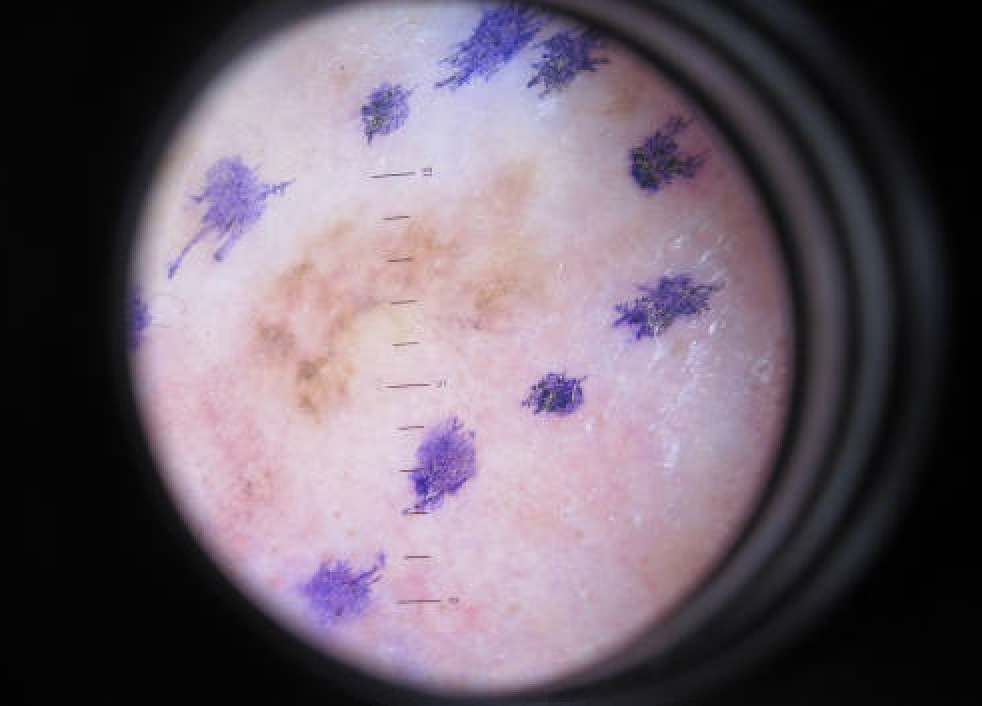
Melanoma in situ, dermatoscope image, right forehead marked for biopsy

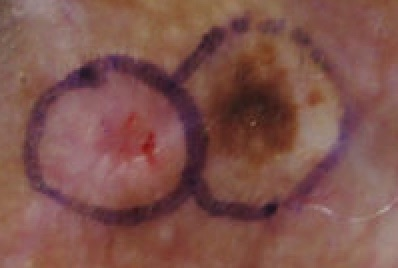
Melanoma in situ, evolving, a medial right temple with adjacent sebaceous hyperplasia, lateral

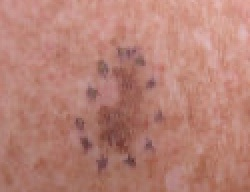
Melanoma in situ, left anterior shoulder marked for biopsy

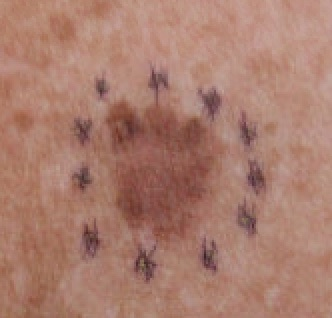
Melanoma in situ, right anterior shoulder marked for biopsy

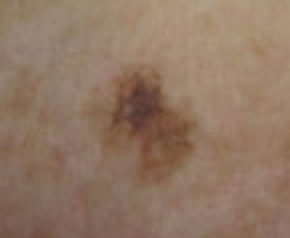
Melanoma in situ, left upper inner arm

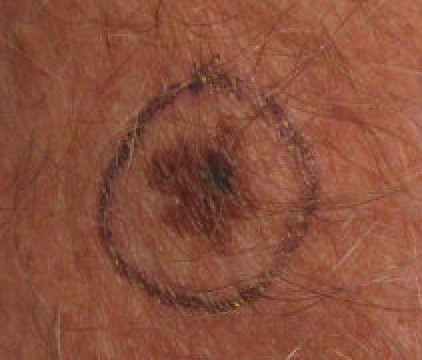
Melanoma in situ marked for biopsy, left forearm

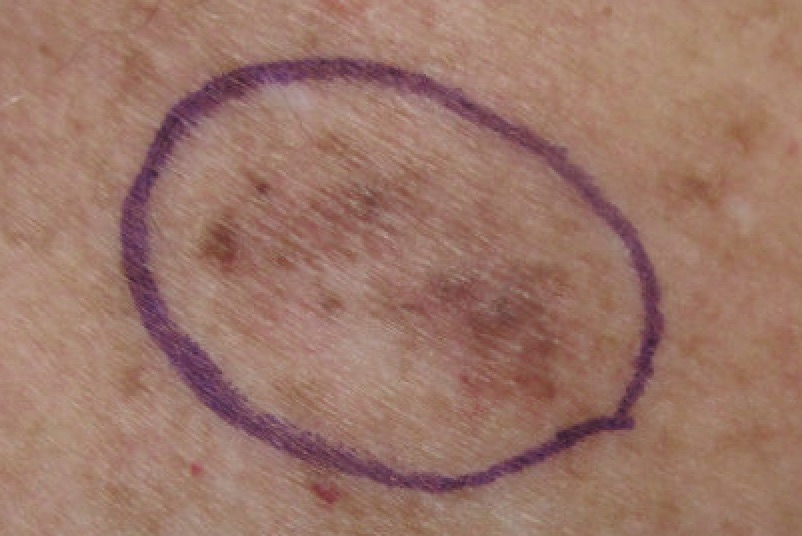
Melanoma in situ, right upper medial back, marked for biopsy

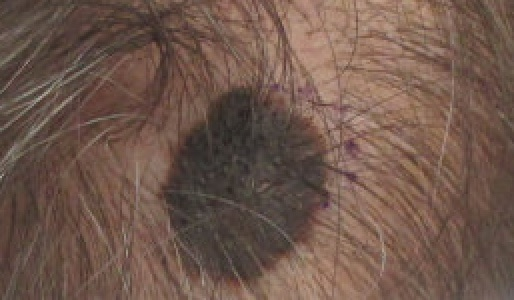
Melanoma, mid frontal scalp

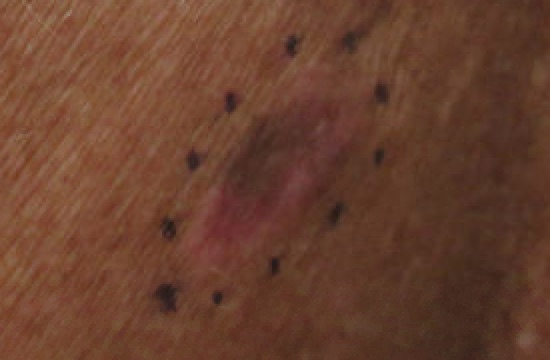
Melanoma, left mid-back marked for biopsy

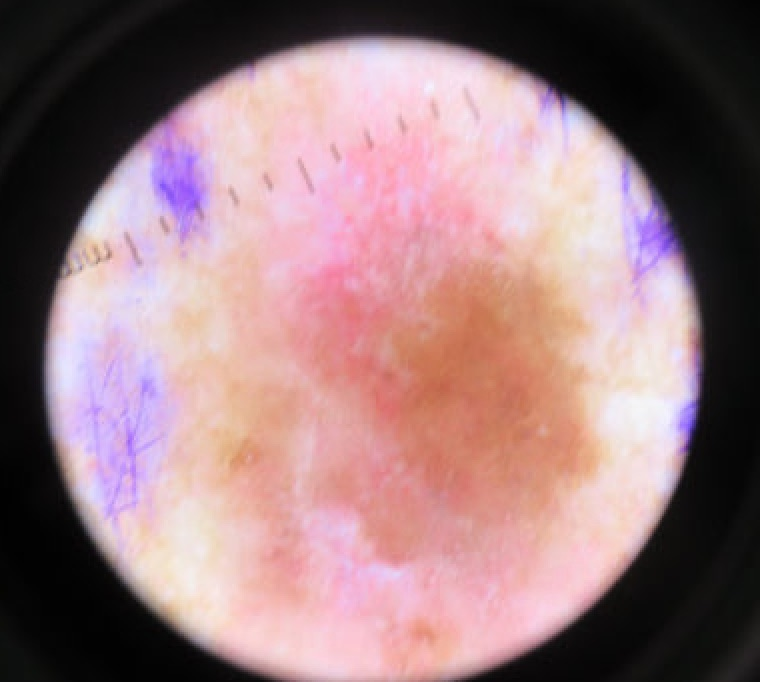
Melanoma, left mid-back marked for biopsy, through dermatoscope

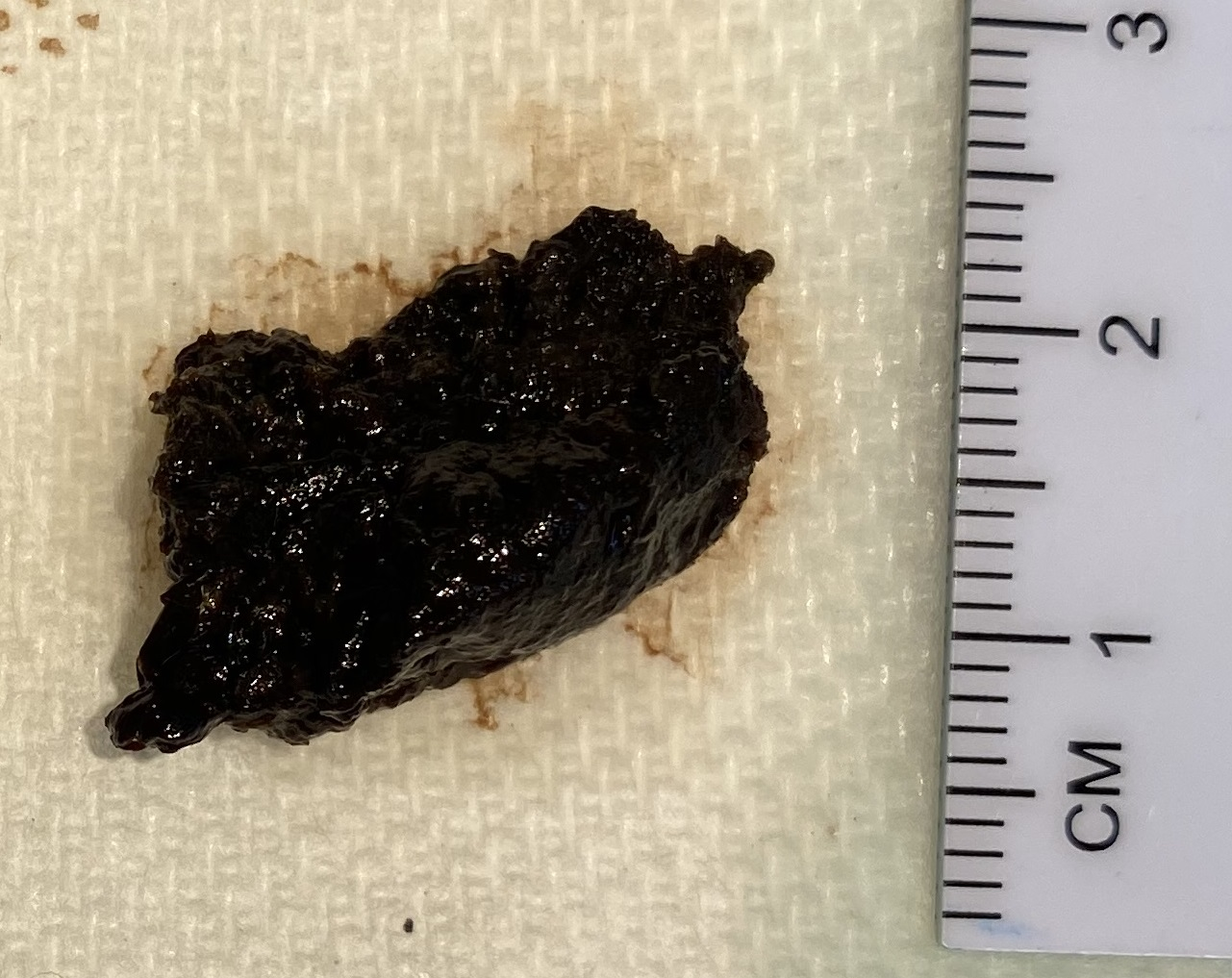
Gross pathology of melanoma metastasis, which is pigment-forming in a vast majority of cases, giving it a dark appearance

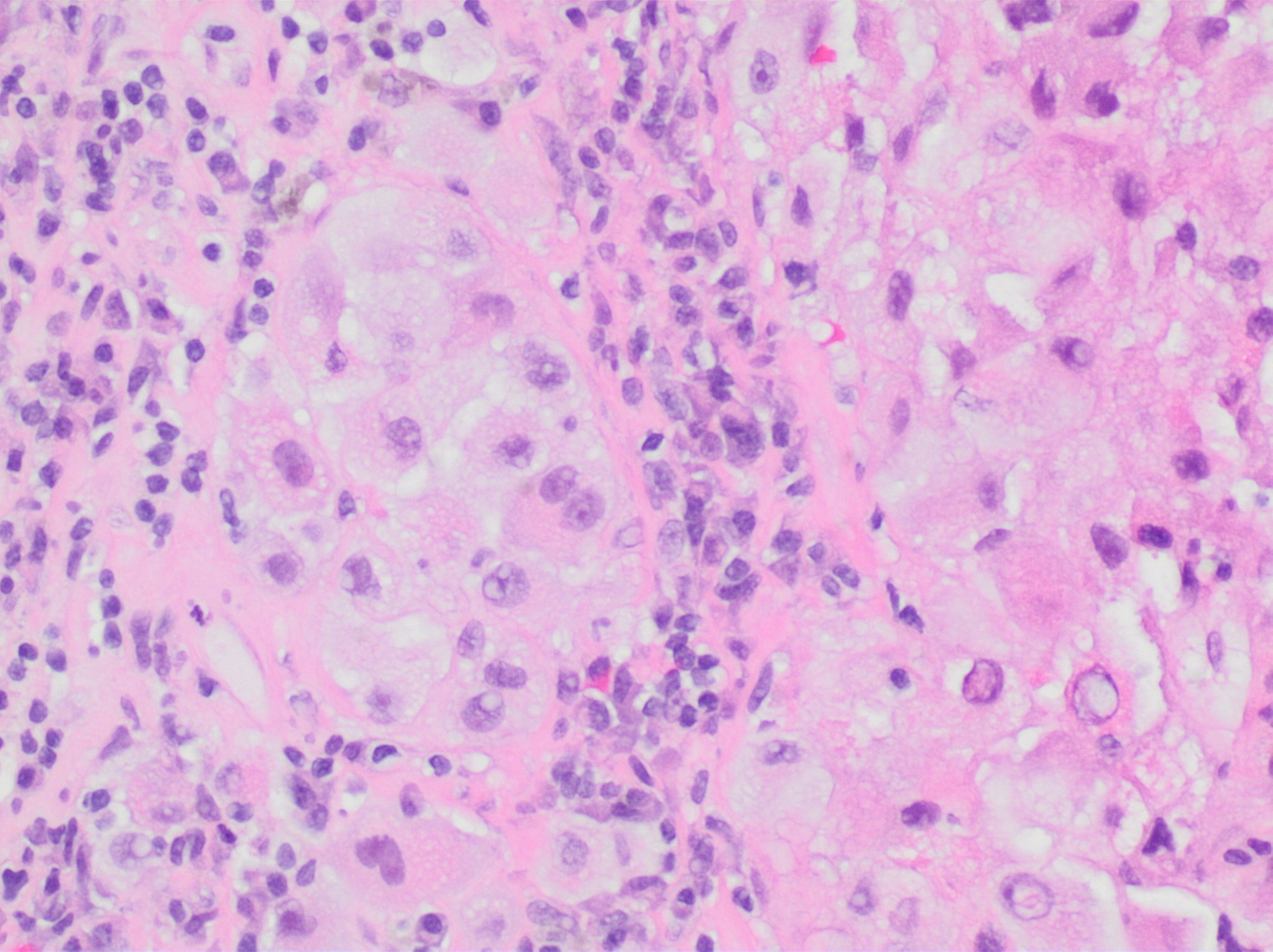
Histopathology of a metastatic melanoma to a lymph node, H&E stain, showing poorly differentiated cells

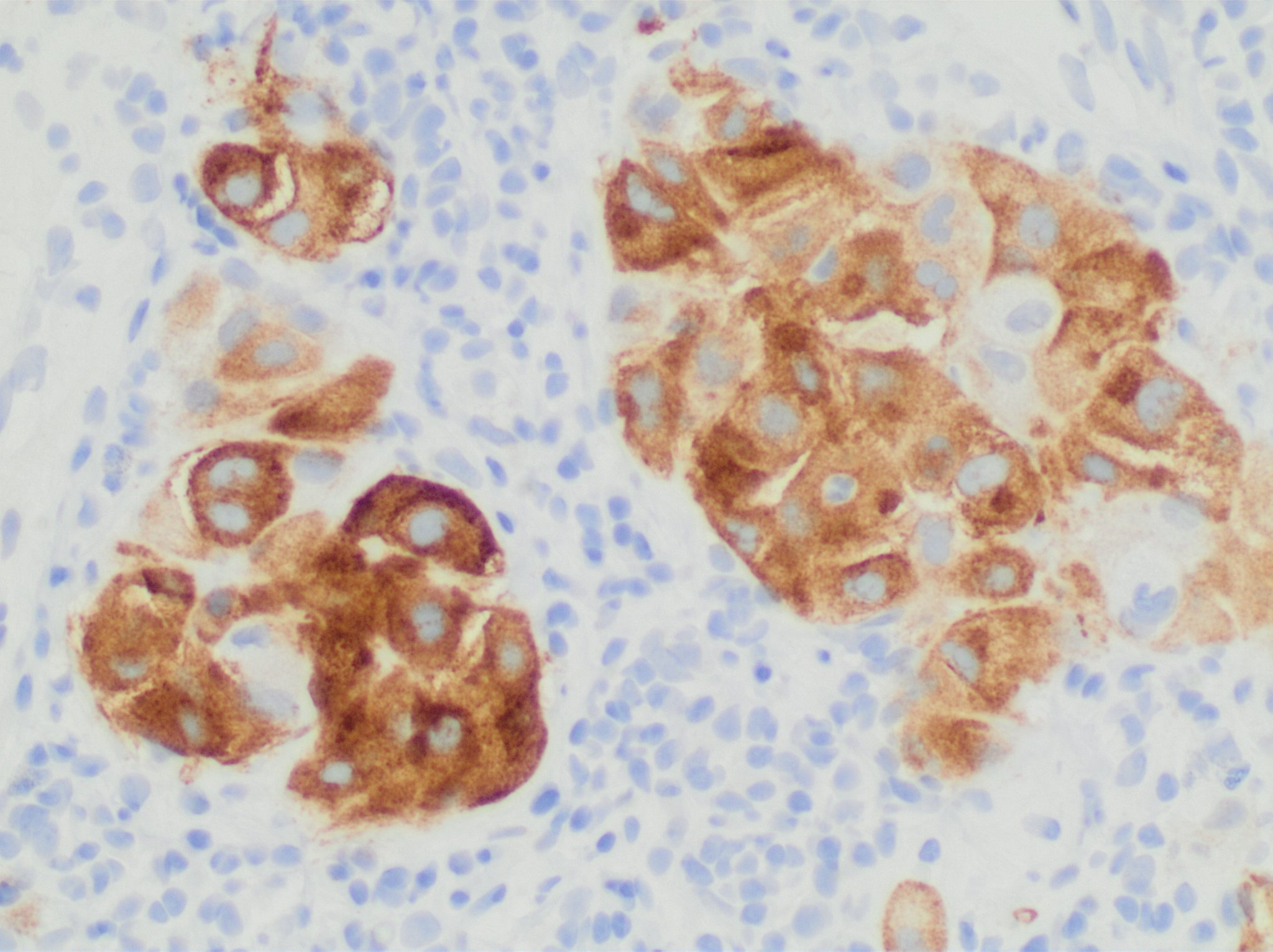
Metastatic melanoma on immunohistochemistry for Melan-A, which helps in diagnosing uncertain cases

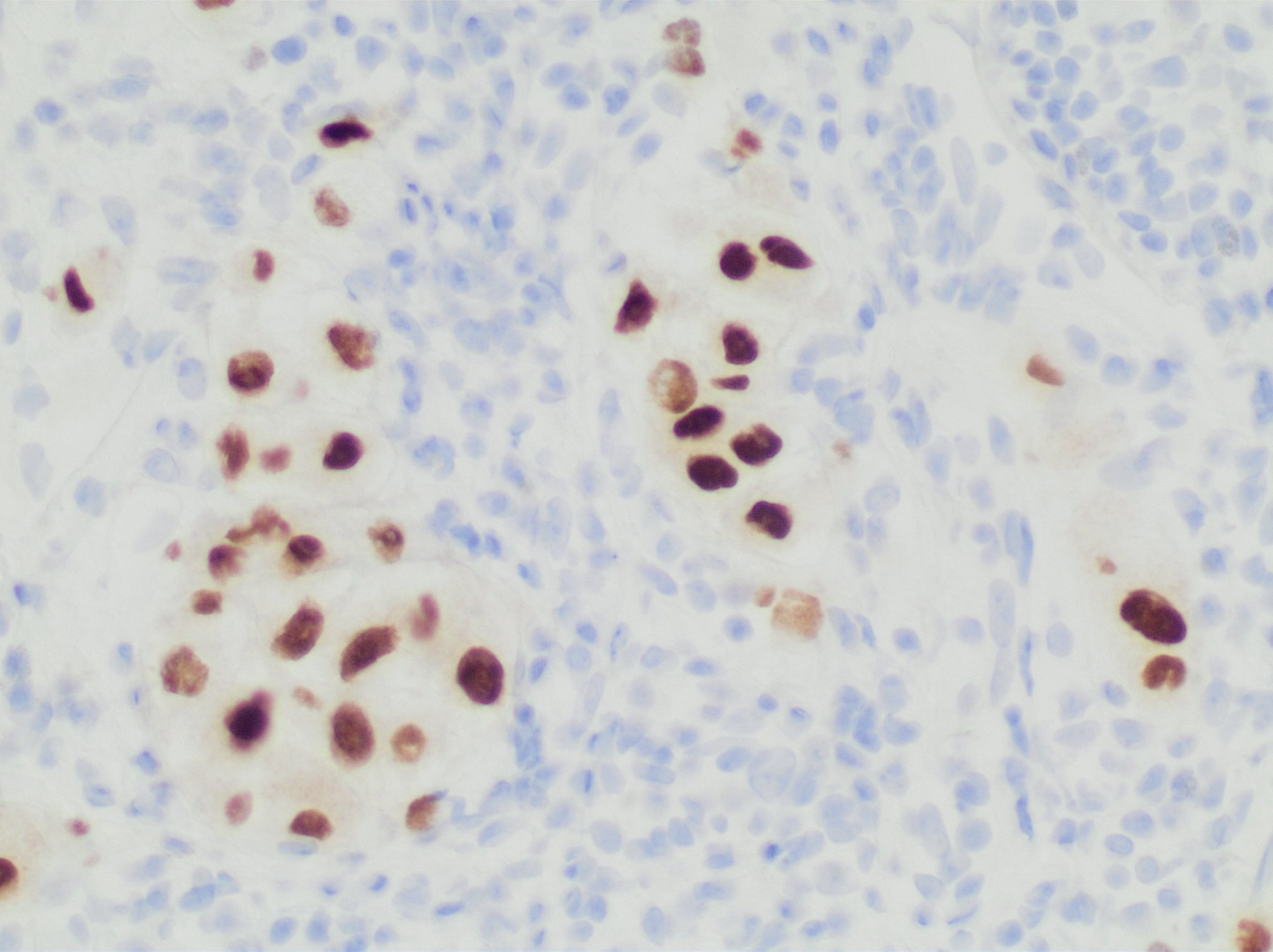
Metastatic melanoma on immunohistochemistry for SOX10, another helpful stain in uncertain cases

=== Ugly duckling ===
One method of finding lesions that are suspected melanomas is the "ugly duckling sign". People's moles tend to look like one another, but when there is a mole that looks different from someone's other moles, it is more likely to be a melanoma. The "Little Red Riding Hood" sign suggests that individuals with fair skin and light-colored hair might have difficult-to-diagnose amelanotic melanomas. Extra care is required when examining such individuals, as they might have multiple melanomas and severely dysplastic nevi.

Amelanotic melanomas (a rare subtype) have very little to no pigmentation and are therefore more difficult to detect. The acral subtype of melanoma presents in areas that do not usually get sun exposure and are difficult to see by a person (the soles of the feet, and palms of hand) making detection difficult. Thirty to 40% of acral melanomas are amelanotic (producing little to no pigment), also making the diagnosis challenging.

=== Biopsy ===
Following a visual examination and a dermatoscopic exam, or other specialized tests such as confocal microscopy, a skin biopsy is done for lesions suspicious of being melanoma. A skin biopsy is required for definitive diagnosis of melanoma and staging the cancer. Elliptical excisional biopsies may remove the tumor, followed by histological analysis and Breslow scoring. Incisional biopsies such as punch biopsies are usually contraindicated in suspected melanomas, because of the possibility of sampling error or local implantation causing misestimation of tumour thickness. However, fears that such biopsies may increase the risk of metastatic disease seem unfounded.

=== Histopathologic types ===
Melanoma is a type of neuroectodermal neoplasm. There are four main types of melanoma:

SN	Type	Features	Incidence (Note: Incidence is in comparison to all melanomas.)	Photograph	Micrograph
1.	Superficial spreading melanoma	Melanoma cells with nest formation along the dermo-epidermal junction.	70%		
2.	Nodular melanoma	Grows relatively more in depth than in width.	15%–20%		
3.	Lentigo maligna melanoma	Linear spread of atypical epidermal melanocytes as well as invasion into the dermis.	5%–10%		
4.	Acral lentiginous melanoma	Continuous proliferation of atypical melanocytes at the dermoepidermal junction.	7%–10%		

Other histopathologic types are:

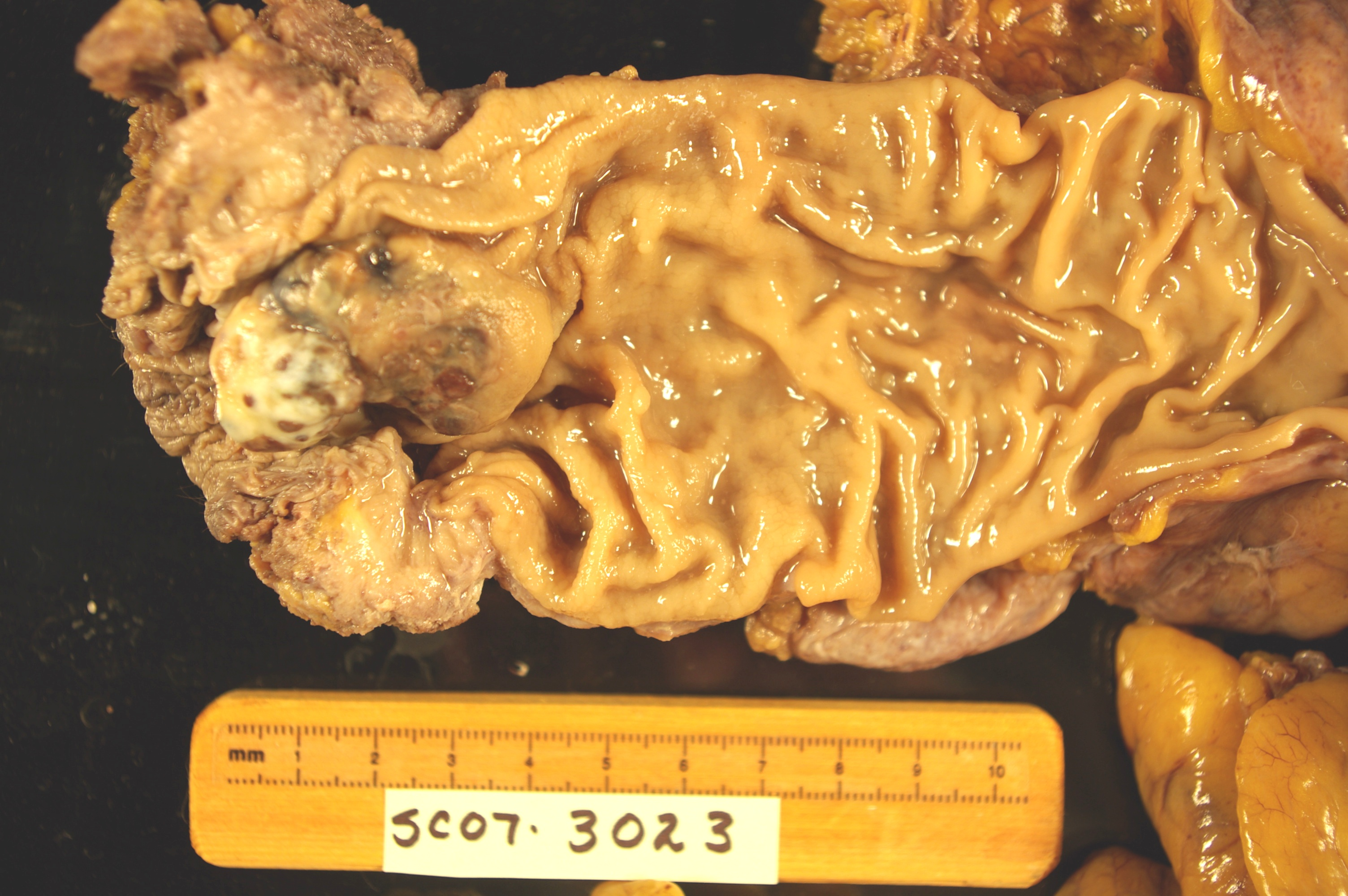
An anal melanoma

- Mucosal melanoma; When melanoma occurs on mucous membranes.
- Desmoplastic melanoma
- Melanoma with small nevus-like cells
- Melanoma with features of a Spitz nevus
- Uveal melanoma
- Vaginal melanoma
- Polypoid melanoma, a subclass of nodular melanoma.

=== In situ or invasive ===
A melanoma in situ has not invaded beyond the basement membrane, whereas an invasive melanoma has spread beyond it.

Some histopathological types of melanoma are inherently invasive, including nodular melanoma and lentigo maligna melanoma, where the in situ counterpart to lentigo maligna melanoma is lentigo maligna. Lentigo maligna is sometimes classified as a very early melanoma, and sometimes a precursor to melanoma.

Superficial spreading melanomas and acral lentiginous melanomas can be either in situ or invasive, but acral lentiginous melanomas are almost always invasive.

=== Staging ===
Further context on cancer staging is available at TNM.

T stages of melanoma

Melanomas are staged based on the depth of invasion in various layers of the skin, the presence of ulceration, spread to local lymph nodes or spread to distant lymph nodes and organs (metastasis).

Metastatic melanomas can be detected by CT scans, MRIs, and PET/CTs, or ultrasound. PET/CT to assess for metastasis is generally recommended for people with stage IIB or greater melanoma. If a person has an ulcerated lesion, or if the depth of tumor invasion is greater than 0.8 mm, then a sentinel lymph node biopsy is recommended. LDH levels may sometimes be elevated in metastatic melanoma, but this is not required for the diagnosis nor staging.

Melanoma stages according to AJCC, 8th edition:

- TX: Primary tumor thickness cannot be assessed (such as a diagnosis by curettage)
- T0: No evidence of primary tumor (such as unknown primary or completely regressed melanoma)

T (tumor)
Stage	T category	Thickness	Ulceration
Stage 0	Melanoma in situ		
Stage I	T1a	Less than 0.8 mm	No
Stage I	T1b	Less than 0.8 mm	Yes
Stage I	T1b	>0.8 to 1.0 mm	Yes or no
Stage I	T2a	>1.0 to 2.0 mm	No
Stage II	T2b	>1.0 to 2.0 mm	Yes
Stage II	T3a	>2.0 to 4.0 mm	No
Stage II	T3b	>2.0 to 4.0 mm	Yes
Stage II	T4a	>4.0 mm	No
Stage II	T4b	>4.0 mm	Yes

Stage 1 and 2 require an N (lymph node) class of:

- N0 – No regional metastases.

N (lymph nodes)
Stage	N category	Number of tumor-involved regional lymph nodes	Presence of in-transit, satellite, and/or microsatellite metastases
N/A	NX	Regional nodes not assessed (such as sentinel lymph node biopsy not performed, or regional nodes previously removed for another reason) (Note: A pathological N category is not required for T1 melanomas. In such cases, clinical N information may be used.)	
Stage III	N1	One involved lymph node, or any number of in-transit, satellite, and/or microsatellite metastases with no tumor-involved nodes.	
Stage III	N1a	One clinically occult (that is, detected by sentinel node biopsy)	No
Stage III	N1b	One clinically detected	No
Stage III	N1c	No regional lymph node disease	Yes
Stage III	N2	Two or 3 tumor‐involved nodes or any number of in‐transit, satellite, and/or microsatellite metastases with one tumor‐involved node	
Stage III	N2a	Two or 3 clinically occult (that is, detected by sentinel node biopsy)	No
Stage III	N2b	Two or 3, at least one of which was clinically detected	No
Stage III	N2c	One clinically occult or clinically detected	Yes
Stage III	N3	Four or more tumor‐involved nodes or any number of in‐transit, satellite, and/or microsatellite metastases with 2 or more tumor‐involved nodes, or any number of matted nodes without or with in‐transit, satellite, and/or microsatellite metastases	
Stage III	N3a	Four or more clinically occult (that is, detected by sentinel node biopsy)	No
Stage III	N3b	Four or more, at least one of which was clinically detected, or the presence of any number of matted nodes	No
Stage III	N3c	Two or more clinically occult or clinically detected and/or presence of any number of matted nodes	Yes

Stage 1, 2 and 3 require an M (metastasis status) of:

- M0: No evidence of distant metastasis

Stage	M category	Anatomic site	lactate dehydrogenase (LDH) level
Stage IV	M1	Evidence of distant metastasis	
Stage IV	M1a	Distant metastasis to the skin, soft tissue including muscle, and/or non-regional lymph node	Not recorded or unspecified
Stage IV	M1a(0)	Distant metastasis to the skin, soft tissue including muscle, and/or non-regional lymph node	Not elevated
Stage IV	M1a(1)	Distant metastasis to the skin, soft tissue including muscle, and/or non-regional lymph node	Elevated
Stage IV	M1b	Distant metastasis to lung with or without metastasis at M1a sites	Not recorded or unspecified
Stage IV	M1b(0)	Distant metastasis to lung with or without metastasis at M1a sites	Not elevated
Stage IV	M1b(1)	Distant metastasis to lung with or without metastasis at M1a sites	Elevated
Stage IV	M1c	Distant metastasis to non‐CNS visceral sites, with or without metastasis to M1a or M1b sites	Not recorded or unspecified
Stage IV	M1c(0)	Distant metastasis to non‐CNS visceral sites, with or without metastasis to M1a or M1b sites	Not elevated
Stage IV	M1c(1)	Distant metastasis to non‐CNS visceral sites, with or without metastasis to M1a or M1b sites	Elevated
Stage IV	M1d	Distant metastasis to CNS, with or without metastasis to M1a, M1b, or M1c sites	Not recorded or unspecified
Stage IV	M1d(0)	Distant metastasis to CNS, with or without metastasis to M1a, M1b, or M1c sites	Not elevated
Stage IV	M1d(1)	Distant metastasis to CNS, with or without metastasis to M1a, M1b, or M1c sites	Elevated

Older systems include "Clark level" and "Breslow's depth", quantifying microscopic depth of tumor invasion.

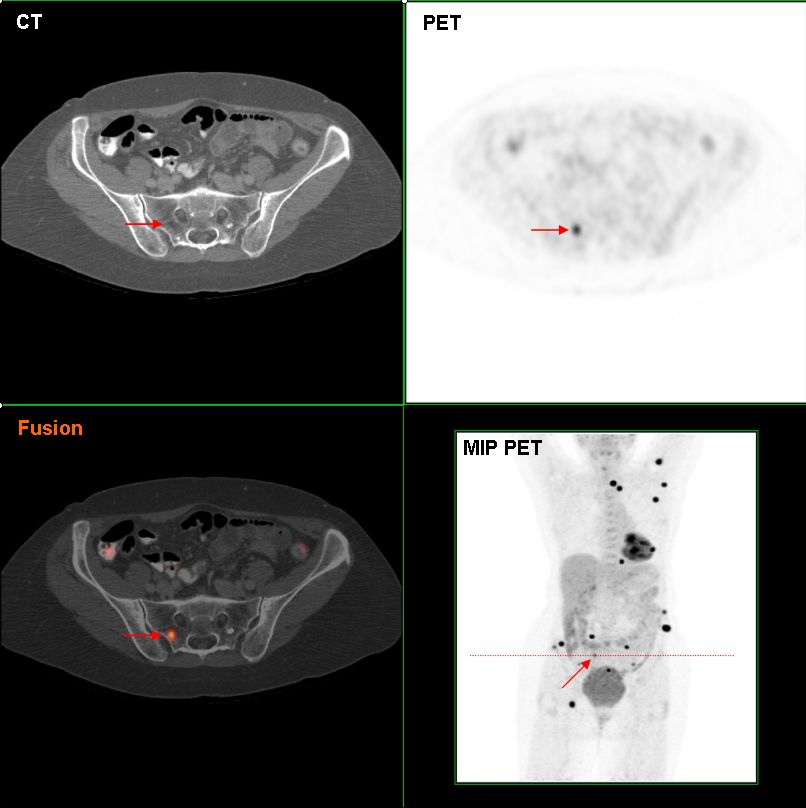
F18-FDG PET/CT in a melanoma patient showing multiple lesions, most likely metastases

=== Laboratory ===
It is common for patients diagnosed with melanoma to have chest X-rays, and in some cases CT, MRI, and/or PET scans. Although controversial, sentinel lymph node biopsies and examination of the lymph nodes are also performed in patients to assess spread to the lymph nodes; this test is very sensitive, with a high negative predictive value, meaning that if no metastatic disease is detected then patients can be assured that the chance of spread is very low. A diagnosis of melanoma is supported by the presence of the S-100 protein marker.

HMB-45 is a monoclonal antibody that reacts against an antigen present in melanocytic tumors such as melanomas. It is used in anatomic pathology as a marker for such tumors. The antibody was generated against an extract of melanoma. It reacts positively against melanocytic tumors but not other tumors, thus demonstrating specificity and sensitivity. The antibody also reacts positively against junctional nevus cells but not intradermal nevi, and against fetal melanocytes but not normal adult melanocytes.

HMB-45 is nonreactive with almost all non-melanoma human malignancies, except rare tumors showing evidence of melanogenesis (e.g., pigmented schwannoma, clear cell sarcoma) or tumors associated with tuberous sclerosis complex (angiomyolipoma and lymphangiomyoma).

== Prevention ==
There is no evidence to support or refute adult population screening for melanoma.

=== Ultraviolet radiation ===
Minimizing exposure to sources of ultraviolet radiation (the sun and sunbeds) and other sun protection measures such as wearing sun protective clothing (long-sleeved shirts, long trousers, and broad-brimmed hats) can offer protection. Using artificial light for tanning was once believed to help prevent skin cancers, but it can lead to an increased incidence of melanomas.

UV nail lamps, which are used in nail salons to dry nail polish, are another widespread source of UV radiation that could be avoided. Although the risk of developing skin cancer through UV nail lamp use is low, it is still recommended to wear fingerless gloves and/or apply SPF 30 or greater sunscreen to the hands before using a UV nail lamp.

The body uses UV light to generate vitamin D so there is a need to balance getting enough sunlight to maintain healthy vitamin D levels and reducing the risk of melanoma; it takes around a half-hour of sunlight for the body to generate its vitamin D for the day and this is about the same amount of time it takes for fair-skinned people to get a sunburn. Exposure to sunlight can be intermittent instead of all at one time.

=== Sunscreen ===
Sunscreen appears to be effective in preventing melanoma. In the past, use of sunscreens with a sun protection factor (SPF) rating of 50 or higher on exposed areas were recommended; as older sunscreens more effectively blocked UVA with higher SPF. Currently, newer sunscreen ingredients (avobenzone, zinc oxide, and titanium dioxide) effectively block both UVA and UVB even at lower SPFs. Sunscreen also protects against squamous cell carcinoma, another skin cancer.

Concerns have been raised that sunscreen might create a false sense of security against sun damage.

=== Medications ===
A 2005 review found tentative evidence that statin and fibrate medication may decrease the risk of melanoma. A 2006 review however did not support any benefit.

== Treatment ==
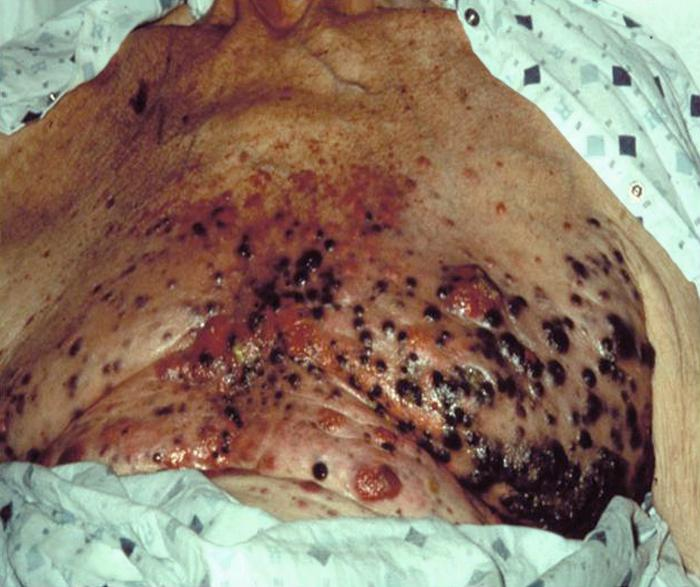
Extensive melanoma on a person's chest

Confirmation of the clinical diagnosis is done with a skin biopsy. This is usually followed up with a wider excision of the scar or tumor. Depending on the stage, a sentinel lymph node biopsy may be performed. Controversy exists around benefit for sentinel lymph node biopsy; with unclear evidence of benefit as of 2015.

=== Surgery ===
Excisional biopsies may remove the tumor, but further surgery is often necessary to make sure all of the tumor is removed and reduce the risk of recurrence. Complete surgical excision with adequate surgical margins is standard. Often this is done by a wide local excision (WLE) with 5 mm to 2 cm margins. Melanoma-in-situ and lentigo malignas are treated with narrower surgical margins, usually 0.2 to 5 mm. A wide-local excision usually removes 5 mm to 2 cm around the tumor, with the margins determined by the Breslow Depth (2 cm margins are removed for a Breslow tumor Depth greater than 2 mm). Mohs surgery, or the double-bladed technique with margin control is sometimes used. The sample is inspected histologically to make sure no tumor cells involve the cut margins, indicating an inadequate tumor of removal. The wide excision aims to reduce the rate of tumor recurrence at the site of the original lesion. A 2009 meta-analysis of randomized controlled trials found a small difference in survival rates favoring wide excision of primary cutaneous melanomas, but these results were not statistically significant.

Mohs surgery has been reported with cure rate as low as 77% and as high as 98.0% for melanoma-in-situ. CCPDMA and the "double scalpel" peripheral margin controlled surgery is equivalent to Mohs surgery in removal of melanoma in-situ.

Melanomas that spread usually do so to the lymph nodes in the area of the tumor before spreading elsewhere. Attempts to improve survival by removing lymph nodes surgically (lymph node dissection) were associated with many complications, but no overall survival benefit.

Sentinel lymph node biopsy may indicate if cancer has spread to local lymph nodes and guide treatment decisions.

Neither sentinel lymph node biopsy nor other diagnostic tests should be performed to evaluate early, thin melanoma, including melanoma in situ, T1a melanoma, or T1b melanoma ≤ 0.5mm. People with these conditions are unlikely to have the cancer spread to their lymph nodes or anywhere else and have a 5-year survival rate of 97%.

Sentinel lymph node biopsy is indicated for ulcerated melanomas or melanomas of greater than 0.8 mm thickness. A process called lymphoscintigraphy is performed in which a radioactive tracer is injected at the tumor site to localize the sentinel node. Further precision is provided using a blue tracer dye, and surgery is performed to biopsy the node. Routine hematoxylin and eosin and immunoperoxidase staining will be adequate to rule out node involvement.

If a lymph node is positive, depending on the extent of lymph node spread, a radical lymph node dissection may be performed in which affected lymph nodes are surgically removed. Lymph node dissection is not associated with a survival benefit in those with melanoma and is no longer recommended.

=== Add on treatment ===
Adjuvant treatment after surgery may reduce the risk of recurrence, especially in high-risk melanomas. The most common adjuvant treatment is immune checkpoint inhibitor treatment for up to a year post-surgery.

In the early 2000s, a relatively common strategy was to treat patients with a high risk of recurrence with up to a year of high-dose interferon treatment. A 2013 meta-analysis suggested that the addition of interferon alpha increased disease-free and overall survival for people with AJCC TNM stage II-III cutaneous melanoma. A 2011 meta-analysis showed that interferon could lengthen the time before a melanoma comes back but increased survival by only 3% at 5 years. The unpleasant side effects also greatly decrease the quality of life. Interferon is no longer routinely used in the treatment of melanoma outside of clinical trials.

=== Chemotherapy ===
Chemotherapy drugs such as dacarbazine have been commonly used for metastatic melanoma since the 1970s; however, their efficacy in terms of survival has never been proven in an RCT. Since the approval of immune checkpoint inhibitors, dacarbazine and its oral counterpart, temozolomide, constitute potential treatment options in later lines of therapy.

Multiple drugs are available to patients to decrease the size of the tumor. By lessening the size of the tumor, some symptoms can be relieved; however, this does not necessarily lead to remission. Some of these drugs are dacarbazine, temozolomide, and fotemustine. Combinations of drugs are also used and, in some cases, present higher remission rates. Although combinations of drugs increase remission rates, the survival rate does not show an increase.

In people with locally advanced cutaneous malignancies and sarcoma, isolated limb infusion (ILI) has been found to be a minimally invasive and well-tolerated procedure for delivering regional chemotherapy.

=== Targeted therapy ===
Melanoma cells have mutations that allow them to survive and grow indefinitely in the body. Small-molecule targeted therapies work by blocking the genes involved in pathways for tumor proliferation and survival. The main treatments are BRAF, C-Kit and NRAS inhibitors. These inhibitors work to inhibit the downstream pathways involved in cell proliferation and tumour development due to specific gene mutations. People can be treated with small-molecule targeted inhibitors if they are positive for the specific mutation. BRAF inhibitors, such as vemurafenib and dabrafenib and a MEK inhibitor trametinib are the most effective, approved treatments for BRAF positive melanoma. Melanoma tumors can develop resistance during therapy which can make therapy no longer effective, but combining the use of BRAF and MEK inhibitors may create a fast and lasting melanoma therapy response.

Several treatments improve survival over traditional chemotherapy. Biochemotherapy (chemotherapy with cytokines IL-2 and IFN-α) combined with BRAF inhibitors improved survival for people with BRAF-positive melanoma. Biochemotherapy alone did not improve overall survival and had higher toxicity than chemotherapy. Combining multiple chemotherapy agents (polychemotherapy) did not improve survival over monochemotherapy. Targeted therapies result in relatively short progression-free survival (PFS) times. The therapy combination of dabrafenib and trametinib has a 3-year PFS of 23% and a 5-year PFS of 13%.

Lifileucel (Amtagvi) is a tumor-derived autologous T-cell immunotherapy that was approved for medical use in the United States in February 2024.

=== Immunotherapy ===
Immunotherapy is aimed at stimulating the person's immune system against the tumor to enhance the body's ability to recognize and kill cancer cells. The current approach to treating melanoma with immunotherapy includes three broad categories of treatments, including cytokines, immune checkpoint inhibitors, and adoptive cell transfer. These treatment options are most often used in people with metastatic melanoma and significantly improve overall survival.

Cytokine therapies used for melanoma include IFN-a and IL-2. IL-2 (Proleukin) was the first new therapy approved (1990 EU, 1992 US) for the treatment of metastatic melanoma in 20 years. IL-2 may offer the possibility of a complete and long-lasting remission in this disease in a small percentage of people with melanoma. Intralesional IL-2 for in-transit metastases has a high complete response rate ranging from 40 to 100%. Similarly, IFN-α has shown only modest survival benefits and high toxicity, limiting its use as a stand-alone therapy.

Immune check point inhibitors include anti-CTLA-4 monoclonal antibodies (ipilimumab and tremelimumab), toll-like receptor (TLR) agonists, CD40 agonists, anti-PD-1 (pembrolizumab, pidilizumab, and nivolumab) and PD-L1 antibodies. Evidence suggests that anti-PD-1 antibodies are more effective than anti-CTLA4 antibodies with less systemic toxicity. The five-year progression-free survival for immunotherapy with pembrolizumab is 21%. Nivolumab or pembrolizumab was associated with increased recurrence free survival at 12 months of treatment. These medications block PD-1 to inhibit T-cell inactivation, this leads to more T-cell proliferation and activity against melanoma cells. Either medication is indicated in Stage IIB-C disease (or observation after resection without using medication is also a treatment option).

For stage IIIA-D disease, resection of tumor may be followed by 12 months of treatment with nivolumab or pembrolizumab or dabrafenib (BRAF inhibitor) plus trametinib (MEK inhibitor)in BRAF gene positive disease. Observation after resection (without using immunotherapy) is also an option, but immunotherapy after resection is associated with an improved cancer-free survival rate at 5 years.

In those with stage III or IV disease that cannot be surgically removed, dual checkpoint blockade by combining nivolumab and ipilimumab (anti-CTLA4 inhibitor) followed by maintenance nivolumab is associated with increased survival and has a lower mortality than using either agent alone.

A therapeutic approach that includes the combination of different therapies improves overall survival and progression-free survival compared to treatment with the separate immunotherapy drugs alone. However, combination therapy also has a higher risk of immune-related adverse reactions (due to hyperactivity of the immune system).

Ongoing research is looking at treatment by adoptive cell transfer. Adoptive cell transfer refers to the application of pre-stimulated, modified T cells or dendritic cells and is presently used to minimize complications from graft-versus-host disease.

The combination nivolumab/relatlimab (Opdualag) was approved for medical use in the United States in March 2022.

=== Lentigo maligna ===
Standard excision is still being done by most surgeons. Unfortunately, the recurrence rate is exceedingly high (up to 50%). This is due to the ill-defined visible surgical margin and the facial location of the lesions (often forcing the surgeon to use a narrow surgical margin). The narrow surgical margin used, combined with the limitation of the standard "bread-loafing" technique of fixed tissue histology, results in a high "false negative" error rate and frequent recurrences. Margin control (peripheral margins) is necessary to eliminate the false-negative errors. If bread loafing is used, distances from sections should approach 0.1 mm to assure that the method approaches complete margin control. A meta-analysis of the literature in 2014 found no randomized controlled trials of surgical interventions to treat lentigo maligna or melanoma in situ, even though surgery is the most widely used treatment.

Mohs surgery has been done with cure rate reported to be as low as 77%, and as high as 95% by another author. The "double scalpel" peripheral margin controlled excision method approximates the Mohs method in margin control, but requires a pathologist intimately familiar with the complexity of managing the vertical margin on the thin peripheral sections and staining methods.

Some melanocytic nevi, and melanoma-in-situ (lentigo maligna) have resolved with an experimental treatment, imiquimod (Aldara) topical cream, an immune enhancing agent. Some derma-surgeons are combining the two methods: surgically excising the cancer and then treating the area with Aldara cream postoperatively for three months. While some studies have suggested the adjuvant use of topical tazarotene, the current evidence is insufficient to recommend it and suggests that it increases topical inflammation, leading to lower patient compliance.

=== Radiation ===
Radiation therapy is often used after surgical resection for patients with locally or regionally advanced melanoma or for patients with unresectable distant metastases. Kilovoltage x-ray beams are often used for these treatments and have the property that the maximum radiation dose occurs close to the skin surface. It may reduce the rate of local recurrence but does not prolong survival. Radioimmunotherapy of metastatic melanoma is currently under investigation. Radiotherapy has a role in the palliation of metastatic melanoma.

== Prognosis ==
A diagram showing the most common sites for melanoma to spread

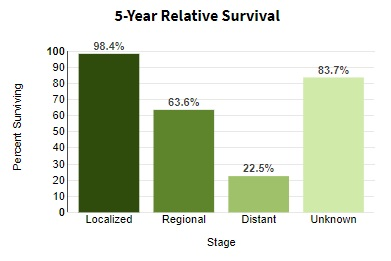
5-year relative survival by stage at diagnosis for melanoma of the skin in the United States as of 2014

Factors that affect prognosis include:

- tumor thickness in millimeters (Breslow's depth),
- depth related to skin structures (Clark level),
- type of melanoma,
- presence of ulceration,
- presence of lymphatic/perineural invasion,
- presence of tumor-infiltrating lymphocytes (if present, prognosis is better),
- location of lesion,
- presence of satellite lesions, and
- presence of regional or distant metastasis.

Certain types of melanoma have worse prognoses, but this is explained by their thickness. Less invasive melanomas, even with lymph node metastases, carry a better prognosis than deep melanomas without regional metastasis at the time of staging. Local recurrences tend to behave similarly to a primary unless they are at the site of a wide local excision (as opposed to a staged excision or punch/shave excision) since these recurrences tend to indicate lymphatic invasion.

When melanomas have spread to the lymph nodes, one of the most important factors is the number of nodes with malignancy. The extent of malignancy within a node is also important; micrometastases, in which malignancy is only microscopic, have a more favorable prognosis than macrometastases. In some cases, micrometastases may only be detected by special staining, and if malignancy is only detectable by polymerase chain reaction (PCR), the prognosis is better. Macro-metastases in which malignancy is clinically apparent (in some cases, cancer completely replaces a node) have a far worse prognosis, and if nodes are matted or if there is extracapsular extension, the prognosis is worse still. In addition to these variables, expression levels and copy number variations of several relevant genes may be used to support assessment of melanoma prognosis.

Stage IV melanoma, in which it has metastasized, is the most deadly skin malignancy: five-year survival in the United States was 34.6% for people diagnosed between 2015 and 2021. Metastases to the skin and lungs have a better prognosis. Metastases to the brain, bone, and liver are associated with a worse prognosis. Survival is better with metastasis in which the location of the primary tumor is unknown. Survival rates have rapidly increased in the decade leading up to 2025.

There is not enough definitive evidence to adequately stage, and thus give a prognosis for, ocular melanoma and melanoma of soft parts, or mucosal melanoma (e.g., rectal melanoma), although these tend to metastasize more easily. Even though regression may increase survival, when a melanoma has regressed, it is impossible to know its original size, and thus the original tumor is often worse than a pathology report might indicate.

About 200 genes are prognostic in melanoma, with both unfavorable genes where high expression is correlated to poor survival and favorable genes where high expression is associated with longer survival times. Examples of unfavorable genes are MCM6 and TIMELESS; an example of a favorable gene is WIPI1.

An increased neutrophil-to-lymphocyte ratio is associated with worse outcomes.

== Epidemiology ==
Age-standardized new cases per year of melanoma of the skin per 100,000 inhabitants in 2008 no data less than 1.75 1.76–3.50 3.51–5.25 5.26–7.00 7.01–8.75 8.76–10.50 10.51–12.25 12.26–14.00 14.01–15.75 15.76–17.50 17.76–19.25 more than 19.25

Deaths from melanoma and other skin cancers per million persons in 2012 0–2 3–5 6-6 7–8 9-9 10–13 14–18 19–37 38–51 52–114

Globally, in 2012, melanoma occurred in 232,000 people and resulted in 55,000 deaths. Australia and New Zealand have the highest rates of melanoma in the world. It has become more common in the last 20 years in areas that are mostly Caucasian.

=== Australia ===
Australia has a very high and increasing rate of melanoma. In 2012, deaths from melanoma occurred in 7.3–9.8 per 100,000 population. In Australia, melanoma is the third most common cancer in both sexes; indeed, its incidence is higher than for lung cancer, although the latter accounts for more deaths. It is estimated that in 2012, more than 12,000 Australians were diagnosed with melanoma: given Australia's modest population, this is better expressed as 59.6 new cases per 100,000 population per year; >1 in 10 of all new cancer cases were melanomas. Melanoma incidence in Australia is a matter of significance, for the following reasons:

- Australian melanoma incidence has increased by more than 30 per cent between 1991 and 2009.
- Australian melanoma age-standardized incidence rates were, as of 2008, at least 12 times higher than the world average.
- Australian melanoma incidence is, by some margin, the highest in the world.
- Overall age-standardized cancer incidence in Australia is the highest in the world, and this is attributable to melanoma alone. Age-standardized overall cancer incidence is similar to New Zealand, but there is a statistically significant difference between Australia and all other parts of the developed world, including North America, Western Europe, and the Mediterranean.

=== United States ===
Melanoma rates by race and ethnicity in the US
Race
White	25
American Indian	5
Mexican	4
Asian	1
Black	1
Melanomas diagnosed in the US per 100,000 people in 2018. Melanomas affect white people much more often than people in any other racial or ethnic classification.

In the United States, about 8-9,000 people die from melanoma a year, and the death rate from melanoma is 1.40 deaths per 100,000 people.

The incidence of melanoma in the United States increased from 8.8 cases per 100,000 people in 1975 to 27.7 cases per 100,000 people in 2021. The annual mortality from melanoma decreased 6.1% annually from 2013 to 2017 and 1.4% annually from 2017 to 2022. Advances in treatment are believed to have caused the rapid decline in mortality over the last decade. In 2024, in the United States, there were 100,640 cases of melanoma and 8290 deaths. There were also 107,240 cases of melanoma in situ, in which melanoma is confined to the epidermis.

Melanoma is more than 20 times more common in whites than in African Americans. Overall, the lifetime risk of getting melanoma is about 2.5% (1 in 40) for whites, 0.1% (1 in 1,000) for African Americans, and 0.5% (1 in 200) for Mexicans.

The risk of melanoma increases as people age. The average age of people when the disease is diagnosed is 63. 80% of all cases of melanoma (globally) are diagnosed in people older than 50 years.

== History ==
Although melanoma is not a new disease, evidence for its occurrence in antiquity is rather scarce. However, one example lies in a 1960s examination of nine Peruvian mummies, radiocarbon dated to be approximately 2400 years old, which showed apparent signs of melanoma: melanotic masses in the skin and diffuse metastases to the bones.

John Hunter is reported to be the first to operate on metastatic melanoma in 1787. Although not knowing precisely what it was, he described it as a "cancerous fungous excrescence". The excised tumor was preserved in the Hunterian Museum of the Royal College of Surgeons of England. It was not until 1968 that microscopic examination of the specimen revealed it to be an example of metastatic melanoma.

The French physician René Laennec was the first to describe melanoma as a disease entity. His report was initially presented during a lecture for the Faculté de Médecine de Paris in 1804 and then published as a bulletin in 1806.

The first English-language report of melanoma was presented by an English general practitioner from Stourbridge, William Norris, in 1820. In his later work in 1857 he remarked that there is a familial predisposition for development of melanoma (Eight Cases of Melanosis with Pathological and Therapeutical Remarks on That Disease). Norris was also a pioneer in suggesting a link between nevi and melanoma and the possibility of a relationship between melanoma and environmental exposures, by observing that most of his patients had pale complexions. He also described that melanomas could be amelanotic and later showed the metastatic nature of melanoma by observing that they can disseminate to other visceral organs.

The first formal acknowledgment of advanced melanoma as untreatable came from Samuel Cooper in 1840. He stated that the only chance for a cure depends upon the early removal of the disease (i.e., early excision of the malignant mole) ...'

More than one and a half centuries later, this situation remains largely unchanged.

=== Terminology ===
The word melanoma came to English from 19th-century Neo-Latin and uses combining forms derived from ancient Greek roots: melano- (denoting melanin) + -oma (denoting a tissue mass and especially a neoplasm), in turn from Greek μέλας melas, "dark", and -ωμα oma, "process". The word melanoma has a long history of being used in a broader sense to refer to any melanocytic tumor, typically, but not always malignant, but today the narrower sense referring only to malignant types has become so dominant that benign tumors are usually not called melanomas anymore and the word melanoma is now usually taken to mean malignant melanoma unless otherwise specified. Terms such as "benign melanocytic tumor" unequivocally label the benign types, and modern histopathologic tumor classifications used in medicine do not use the word for benign tumors.

== Research ==
Pharmacotherapy research for un-resectable or metastatic melanoma is ongoing.

=== Targeted therapies ===
In clinical research, adoptive cell therapy and gene therapy, are being tested.

Two kinds of experimental treatments developed at the National Cancer Institute (NCI) have been used in metastatic melanoma with tentative success.

The first treatment involves adoptive cell therapy (ACT) using TILs, immune cells (tumor-infiltrating lymphocytes) isolated from a person's own melanoma tumor. These cells are grown in large numbers in a laboratory and returned to the patient after a treatment that temporarily reduces normal T cells in the patient's body. TIL therapy following lymphodepletion can result in durable complete response in a variety of setups.

The second treatment, adoptive transfer of genetically altered autologous lymphocytes, depends on delivering genes that encode so-called T cell receptors (TCRs) into the patient's lymphocytes. After that manipulation, lymphocytes recognize and bind to certain molecules found on the surface of melanoma cells and kill them.

A cancer vaccine showed modest benefit in late-stage testing in 2009 against melanoma.

=== BRAF inhibitors ===
About 60% of melanomas contain a mutation in the B-Raf gene. Early clinical trials suggested that B-Raf inhibitors including Plexxicon's vemurafenib could lead to substantial tumor regression in a majority of patients if their tumor contain the B-Raf mutation. In June 2011, a large clinical trial confirmed the positive findings from those earlier trials.

In August 2011, Vemurafenib received FDA approval for the treatment of late-stage melanoma. In May 2013, the US FDA approved dabrafenib as a single-agent treatment for patients with BRAF V600E mutation-positive advanced melanoma.

Some researchers believe that combination therapies that simultaneously block multiple pathways may improve efficacy by making it more difficult for the tumor cells to mutate before being destroyed. In October 2012, a study reported that combining Dabrafenib with a MEK inhibitor trametinib led to even better outcomes. Compared to Dabrafenib alone, progression-free survival was increased to 41% from 9%, and the median progression-free survival increased to 9.4 months versus 5.8 months. Some side effects were, however, increased in the combined study.

In January 2014, the FDA approved the combination of dabrafenib and trametinib for the treatment of people with BRAF V600E/K-mutant metastatic melanoma. In June 2018, the FDA approved the combination of a BRAF inhibitor encorafenib and a MEK inhibitor binimetinib for the treatment of un-resectable or metastatic melanoma with a BRAF V600E or V600K mutation.

Eventual resistance to BRAF and MEK inhibitors may be due to a cell surface protein known as EphA2 which is now being investigated.

=== Ipilimumab ===
At the American Society of Clinical Oncology Conference in June 2010, the Bristol Myers Squibb pharmaceutical company reported the clinical findings of their drug ipilimumab. The study found an increase in median survival from 6.4 to 10 months in patients with advanced melanomas treated with the monoclonal ipilimumab, versus an experimental vaccine. It also found a one-year survival rate of 25% in the control group using the vaccine, 44% in the vaccine and ipilimumab group, and 46% in the group treated with ipilimumab alone. However, some have raised concerns about this study for its use of the unconventional control arm, rather than comparing the drug against a placebo or standard treatment. The criticism was that although Ipilimumab performed better than the vaccine, the vaccine has not been tested before and may be causing toxicity, making the drug appear better by comparison.

Ipilimumab was approved by the FDA in March 2011 to treat patients with late-stage melanoma that has spread or cannot be removed by surgery.

In June 2011, a clinical trial of ipilimumab plus dacarbazine combined this immune system booster with the standard chemotherapy drug that targets cell division. It showed an increase in median survival for these late-stage patients to 11 months instead of the 9 months normally seen. Researchers were also hopeful of improving the five-year survival rate, though serious adverse side effects were seen in some patients. A course of treatment costs $120,000. The drug's brandname is Yervoy.

=== Surveillance methods ===
Advances in high-resolution ultrasound scanning have enabled surveillance of metastatic burden to the sentinel lymph nodes. The Screening and Surveillance of Ultrasound in Melanoma trial (SUNMEL) is evaluating ultrasound as an alternative to invasive surgical methods.

=== Oncolytic virotherapy ===
In some countries, oncolytic virotherapy methods are studied and used to treat melanoma. Oncolytic virotherapy is a promising branch of virotherapy, where oncolytic viruses are used to treat diseases; viruses can increase metabolism, reduce anti-tumor immunity, and disorganize vasculature. Talimogene laherparepvec (T-VEC) (which is a herpes simplex virus type 1–derived oncolytic immunotherapy), was shown to be useful against metastatic melanoma in 2015 with an increased survival of 4.4 months.

=== Antivirals ===
Antiretrovirals have been tested in vitro against melanoma. The rationale behind this lies in their potential to inhibit human endogenous retroviruses, whose activity has been associated with the development of melanoma. Evidence from studies on melanoma cell lines indicates that antiretroviral drugs, including lamivudine, doravirine, and cabotegravir, can effectively downregulate the expression of human endogenous retroviruses (HERV-K). These drugs not only reduce cell growth and invasiveness but also enhance the potential of immune checkpoint therapies. Furthermore, they have shown promise in addressing resistance mechanisms that emerge following prolonged treatment with BRAF inhibitors like dabrafenib and AZ628. By restoring apoptosis, decreasing cell viability, and influencing tumor suppressor proteins, these antiretrovirals offer a compelling strategy to tackle therapeutic resistance in melanoma. Further developments are awaited through animal model testing.

=== MicroRNAs ===
Recent research has identified miR-139-5p, a small noncoding RNA, as a potential tumor suppressor in melanoma. Overexpression of miR-139-5p has been shown to inhibit cell proliferation, migration, and invasion while inducing apoptosis in melanoma cells. These effects are associated with the downregulation of IGF1R, a receptor that activates the PI3K/AKT signaling pathway. By suppressing IGF1R-mediated signaling, miR-139-5p reduces melanoma cell aggressiveness. These findings highlight miR-139-5p as a potential therapeutic agent and emphasize the significance of miRNA regulation in melanoma development and treatment.
