= Breslow's depth =

In medicine, Breslow's depth was used as a prognostic factor in melanoma of the skin. It is a description of how deeply tumor cells have invaded. Currently, the standard Breslow's depth has been replaced by the AJCC depth, in the AJCC staging system of melanoma. Originally, Breslow's depth was divided into 5 stages.

== Classification ==
Breslow's depth
Stage	Depth
Stage I	≤ 0.75 mm
Stage II	0.76–1.50 mm
Stage III	1.51–4.00 mm
Stage IV	> 4.00 mm

== History ==
Depth of invasion was first reported as a prognostic factor in melanoma by the pathologist Alexander Breslow, M.D. at George Washington University in 1970. In recognition of his contribution, the depth of invasion of melanoma is referred to by the eponym Breslow's depth.

Subsequent studies confirmed and refined the role of depth of invasion in the prognosis of melanoma. Currently, Breslow's depth is included in the AJCC staging guidelines for melanoma as a major prognostic factor.

== Measurement ==
Tumor depth is most accurately measured by evaluating the entire tumor via an excisional biopsy. Determination from specimens obtained using other biopsy techniques, such as a wedge or punch biopsy, are less accurate. Tumor depth cannot be calculated from a shave biopsy that only contains a portion of the tumor because it leads to an underestimation of its thickness.

Breslow's depth is determined by using an ocular micrometer at a right angle to the skin to directly measure the depth to which tumor cells have invaded the skin. Breslow's depth is measured from the granular layer of the epidermis down to the deepest point of invasion (sometimes involving detached nests of cells).

== Prognostic importance ==
Tumor depth is one of the cornerstones of the current AJCC TNM staging of melanoma. A large study validated the importance of tumor depth (but not Breslow's original description) as one of the three most important prognostic factors in melanoma (the others being T stage and ulceration). Breslow's depth also accurately predicted the risk for lymph node metastasis, with deeper tumors being more likely to involve the nodes.

The above studies showed that depth was a continuous variable correlating with prognosis. However, for staging purposes, the most recent AJCC guidelines use cutoffs of 1 mm, 2 mm, and 4 mm to divide patients into stages.

Tumor Depth	Approximate 5 year survival
< 1 mm	95–100%
1–2 mm	80–96%
2.1–4 mm	60–75%
> 4 mm	50%

Survival figures from British Association of Dermatologist Guidelines, 2002

== Clark's level ==
Clark's level is a related staging system, used in conjunction with Breslow's depth, which describes the level of anatomical invasion of the melanoma in the skin. Clark's level was the primary factor in earlier AJCC staging schemas for melanoma. However, with further study, it has been shown that Clark's level has a lower predictive value, is less reproducible, and is more operator-dependent as compared with Breslow's depth. Thus, in the current (2010) AJCC staging system, Clark's level has prognostic significance only in patients with very thin (Breslow depth <1 mm) melanomas.

Five anatomical levels are recognized, and higher levels have worsening prognostic implications. These levels are:

- Level 1: Melanoma confined to the epidermis (melanoma in situ)
- Level 2: Invasion into the papillary dermis
- Level 3: Invasion to the junction of the papillary and reticular dermis
- Level 4: Invasion into the reticular dermis
- Level 5: Invasion into the subcutaneous fat

== See also ==
- ABCD guideline
- American Joint Committee on Cancer (AJCC)
- Cancer staging
