= Optic nerve tumor =

Medical condition

An optic nerve melanocytoma is a tumor made up of melanocytes and melanin. Melanocytomas are typically a benign meaning they can grow, but rarely transform into a malignancy. Even so, local growth can affect adjacent tissues. Most optic nerve melanocytomas are small, black, and do not grow. Most optic nerve tumors (65 percent) are gliomas that occur somewhere along the anterior visual pathway.

== Symptoms and signs ==
Patients who have malignant gliomas of the optic nerve have rapidly progressive, painful visual loss accompanied by signs of an optic neuropathy. Initial visual loss may be unilateral or bilateral (chiasmal involvement), but rapid progression to bilateral blindness and death are constant features. Depending on the initial location of the tumor, visual loss may be accompanied by exophthalmos, extraocular motility

Optic nerve melanocytoma does not usually produce symptoms or grow. If they slowly grow, optic nerve melanocytoma can produce afferent pupillary defects (30%), subretinal fluid (10%), and an enlarged blind spot (75%).

On fundoscopic exam, the optic disc may be swollen, atrophic, or even normal. Central retinal vein occlusion may occur.

If the tumor is next to the optic nerve, growth can compress the nerve and cause gradual loss of vision and unilateral proptosis. Dyschromatopsia may occur. Growth can also cause compressive vascular problems like central retinal vein occlusion. Lastly, growth also causes the tumor to exceed its blood supply. In these cases, necrotic areas form inside the tumor. Necrosis can (in turn) cause intraocular and rarely orbital inflammation.

== See also ==
- Melanocytoma
