= Egg case =

Egg case may refer to:

- Ootheca, an egg case made by some insects and molluscs
- Egg case (Chondrichthyes), an egg case made by some sharks, skates, and chimaeras
