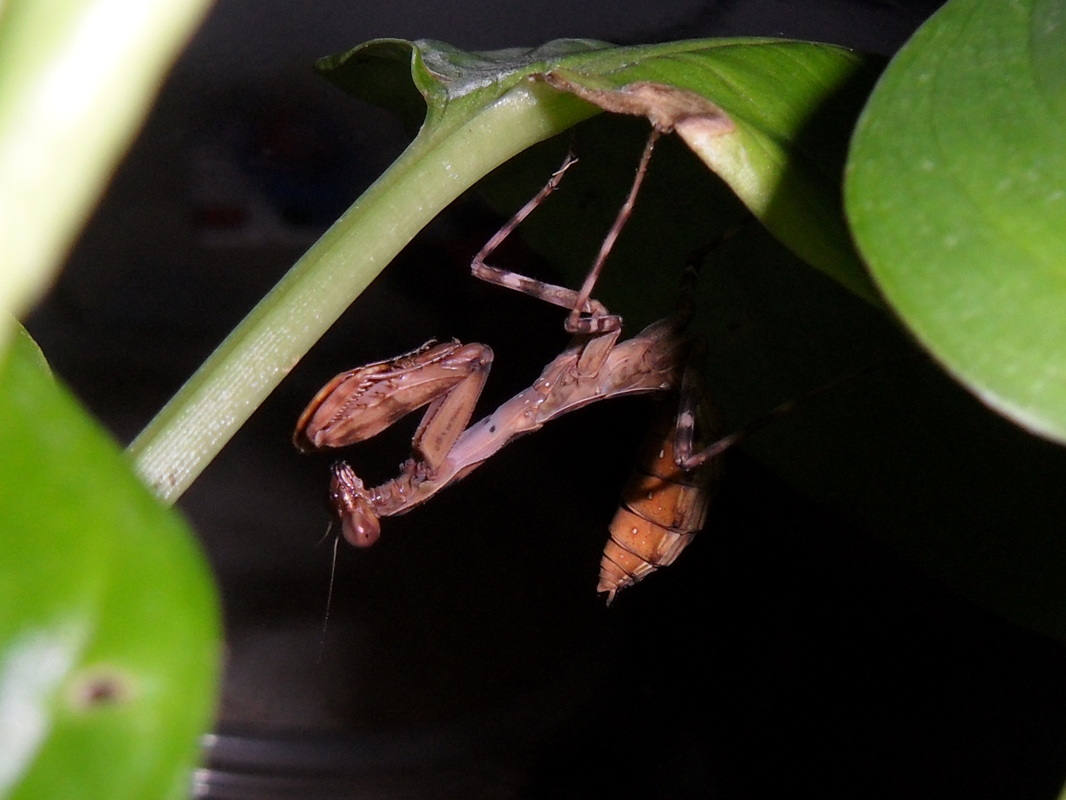
- Female L5 nymph

Scientific classification
- Kingdom: Animalia
- Phylum: Arthropoda
- Clade: Pancrustacea
- Class: Insecta
- Order: Mantodea
- Family: Mantidae
- Genus: Pnigomantis
- Species: P. medioconstricta

Binomial name
- Pnigomantis medioconstricta Westwood, 1889

= Pnigomantis =

Pnigomantis medioconstricta

Species of praying mantis

Pnigomantis is a genus of mantises in the family Mantidae. It is monotypic, being represented by the single species Pnigomantis medioconstricta common name Indonesian double shield mantis or double shield mantis.

== Description ==
Adult males are about 79 millimeters in length while adult females are about 86 to 89 millimeters in length. The coloration is highly variable, and seemingly not related to environmental conditions. There are red bands in between the upper abdominal segments used in the threat display used to deter predators. The characteristic "double shield" appears roughly after the fifth instar, females have nine instars, while males have eight. The inside of the forearms is a light blue-purple color, with dark black markings on the lower arms to seemingly act as eyespots. Most adults will turn a grey color with slight checkering on the wings, two light spots are present on the forewings. The Pnigomantis also possesses two light "cheek" patches.

== Range ==
Pnigomantis medioconstricta are endemic to the island of Flores off of Indonesia.

== Captivity ==
Pnigomantis medioconstricta are kept in captivity. Breeding this species can be a slight challenge due to females being highly aggressive and the smaller number of males per ootheca. This species of mantid eats many invertebrates and vertebrates. This species is strongly built and very aggressive, and they often chase their prey. First instar nymphs readily take Drosophila hydei fruit flies, and graduate to much larger prey as they near adult. Adult females will occasionally take live mice.

== Additional images ==
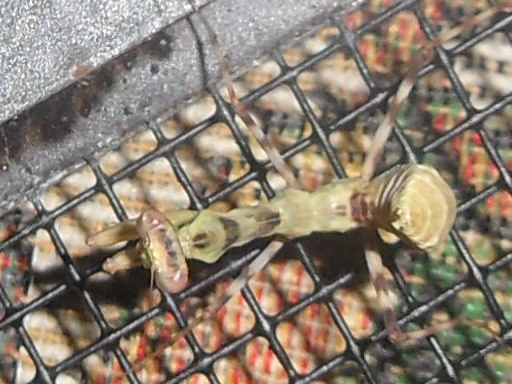
Pnigomantis medioconstricta L3 nymph

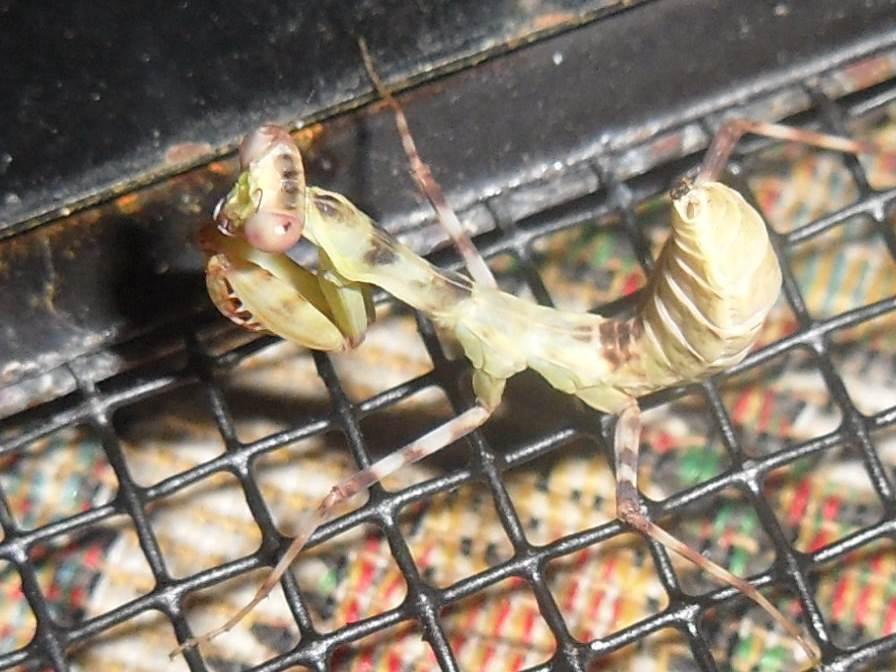
Pnigomantis medioconstricta L3 nymph

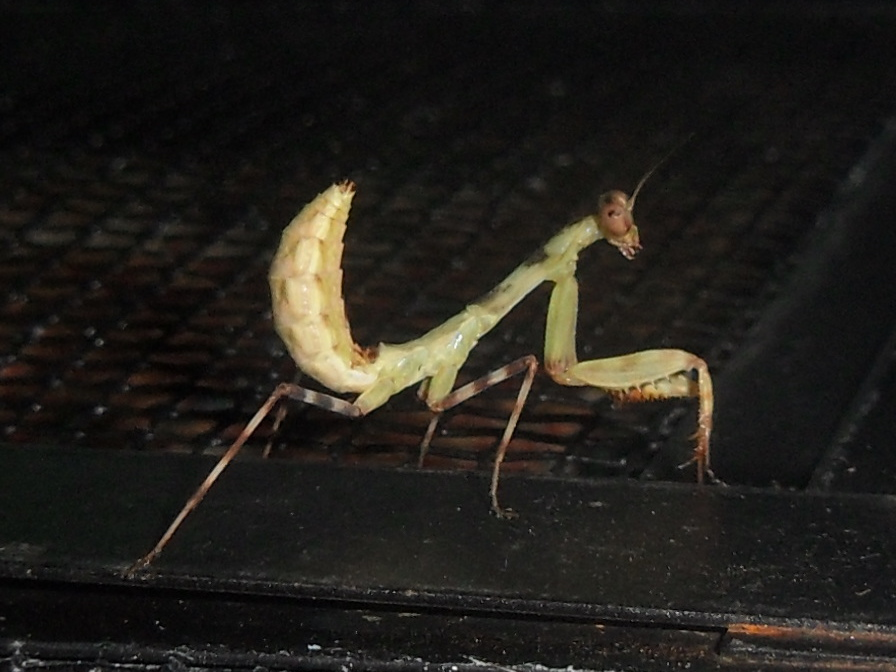
Pnigomantis medioconstricta L3 nymph

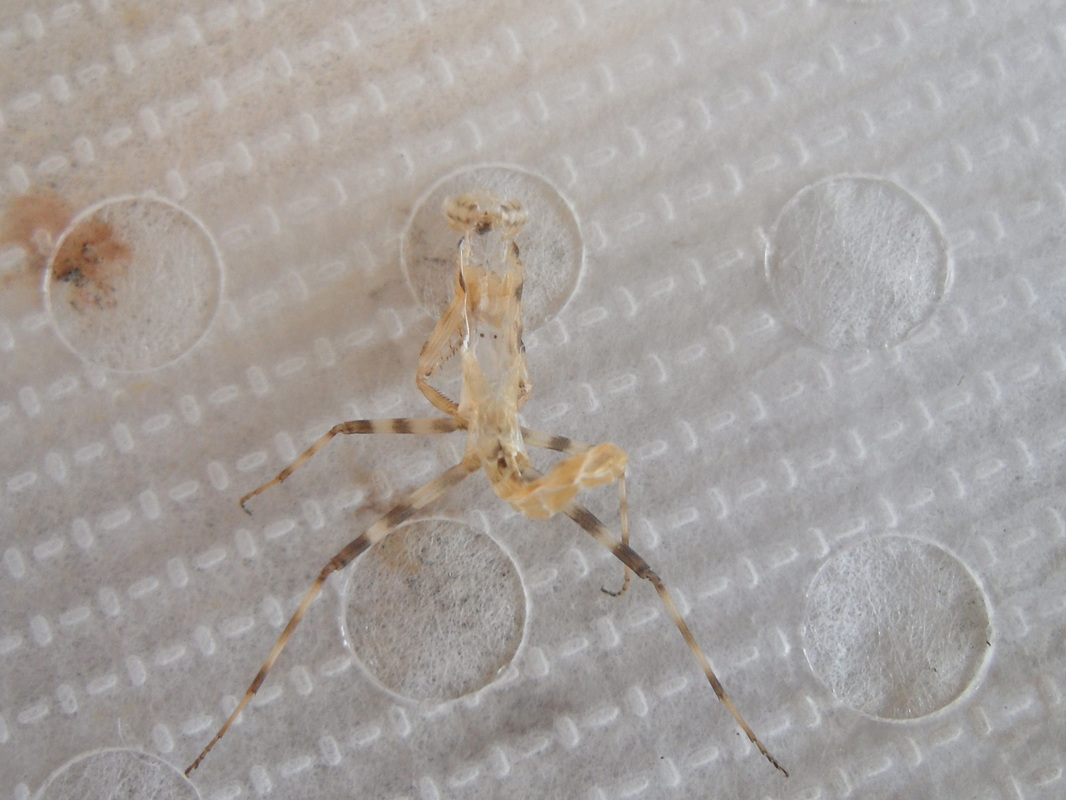
Pnigomantis medioconstricta L3 molt

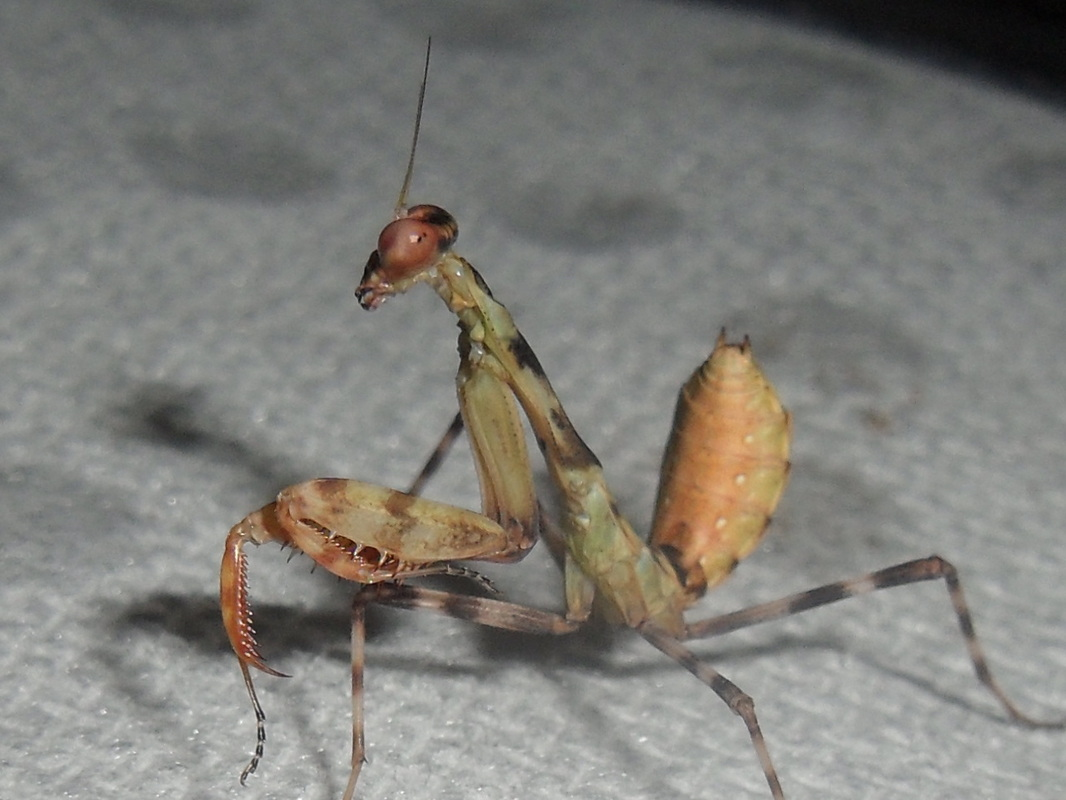
Female Pnigomantis medioconstricta L4 nymph

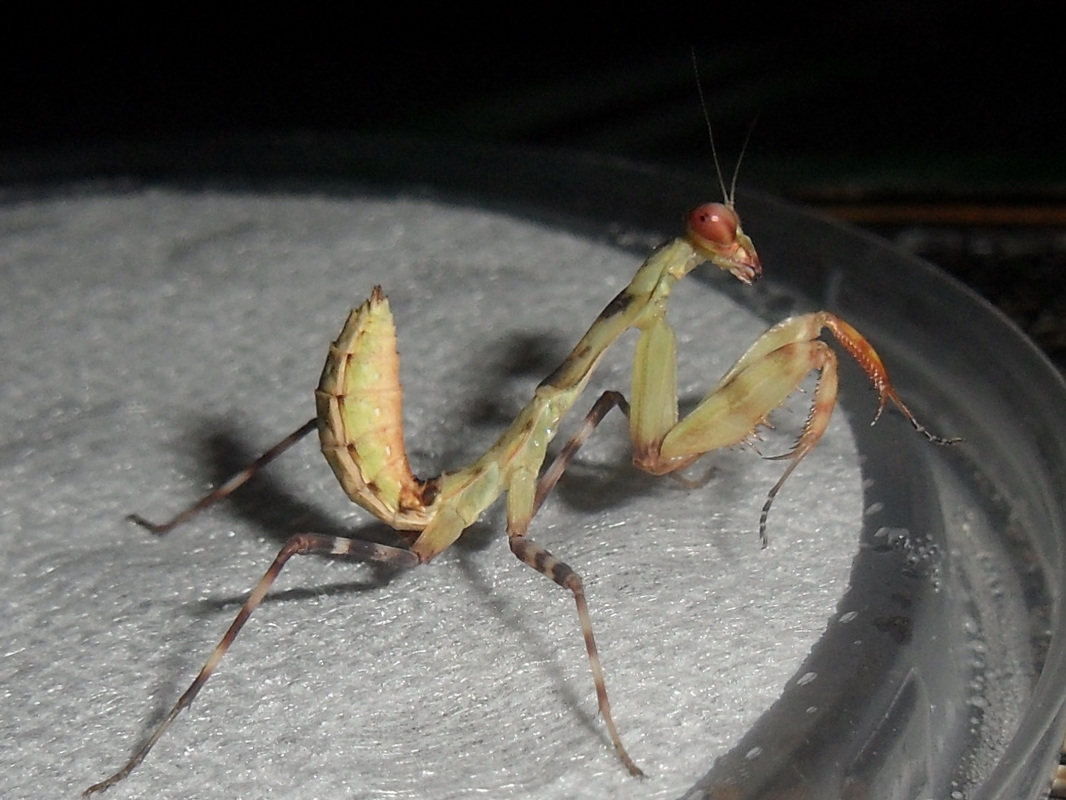
Female Pnigomantis medioconstricta L4 nymph

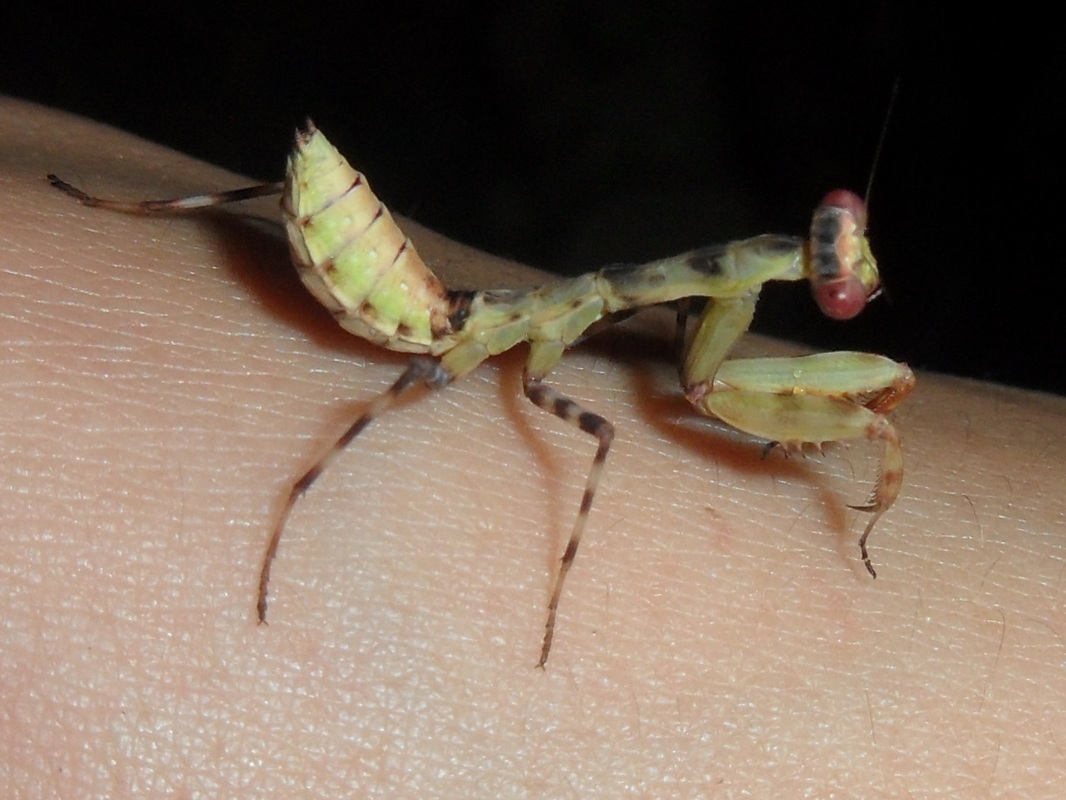
Female Pnigomantis medioconstricta L4 nymph

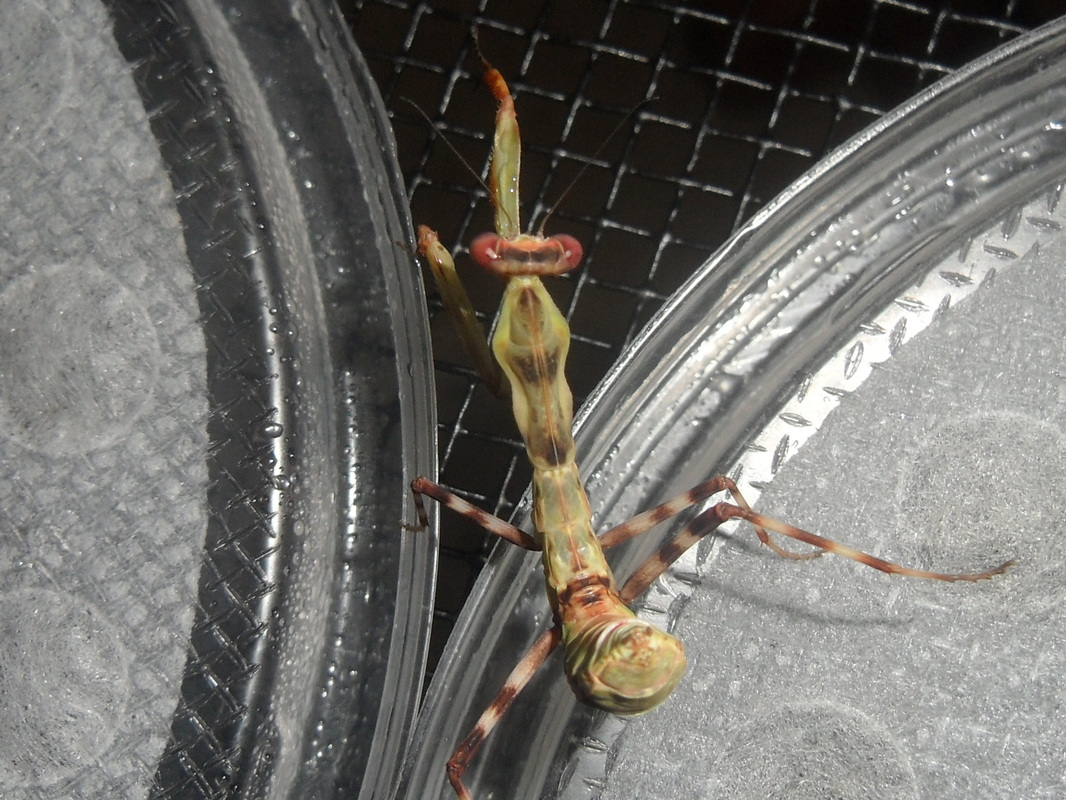
Female Pnigomantis medioconstricta L4 nymph

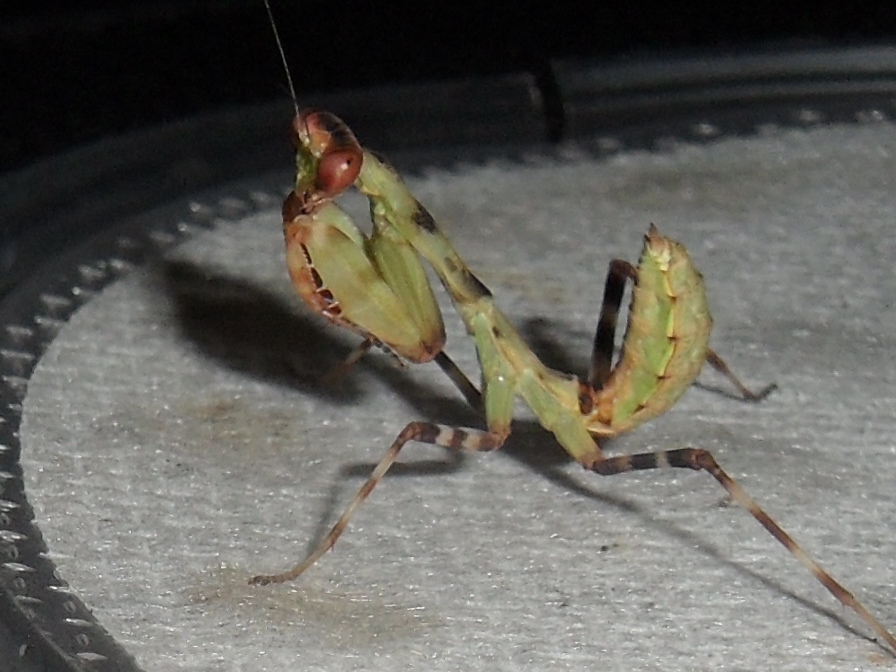
Female Pnigomantis medioconstricta L4 nymph

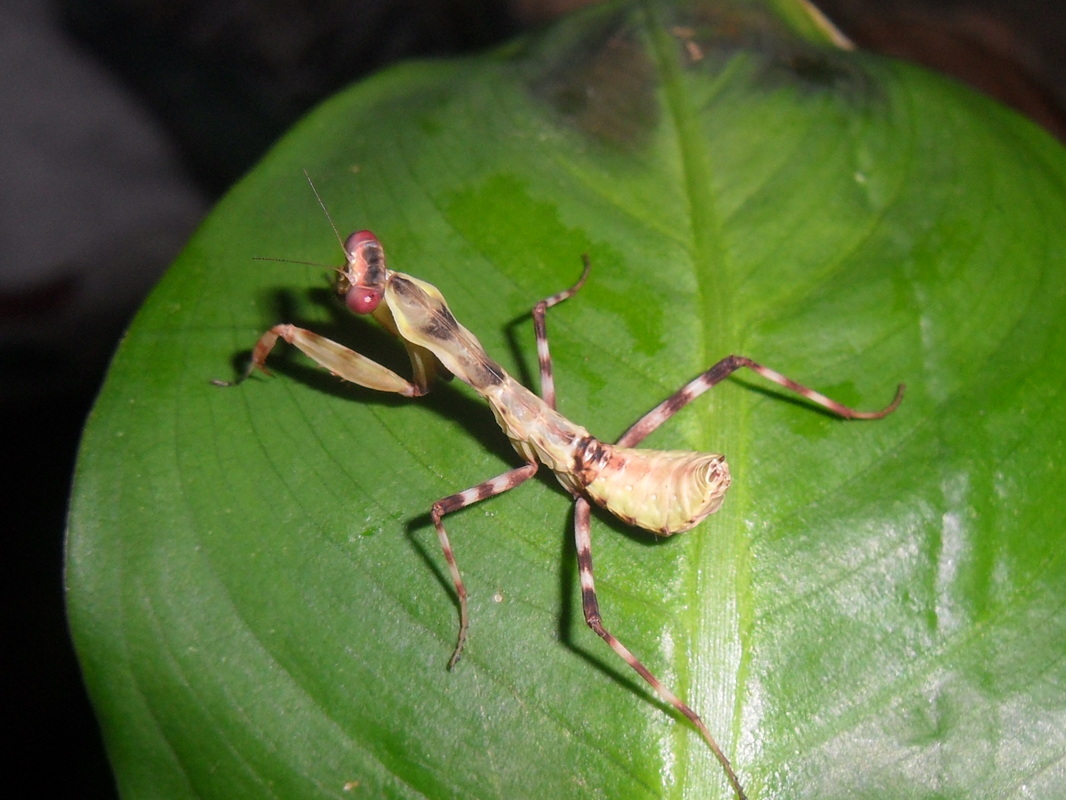
Female Pnigomantis medioconstricta L4 nymph

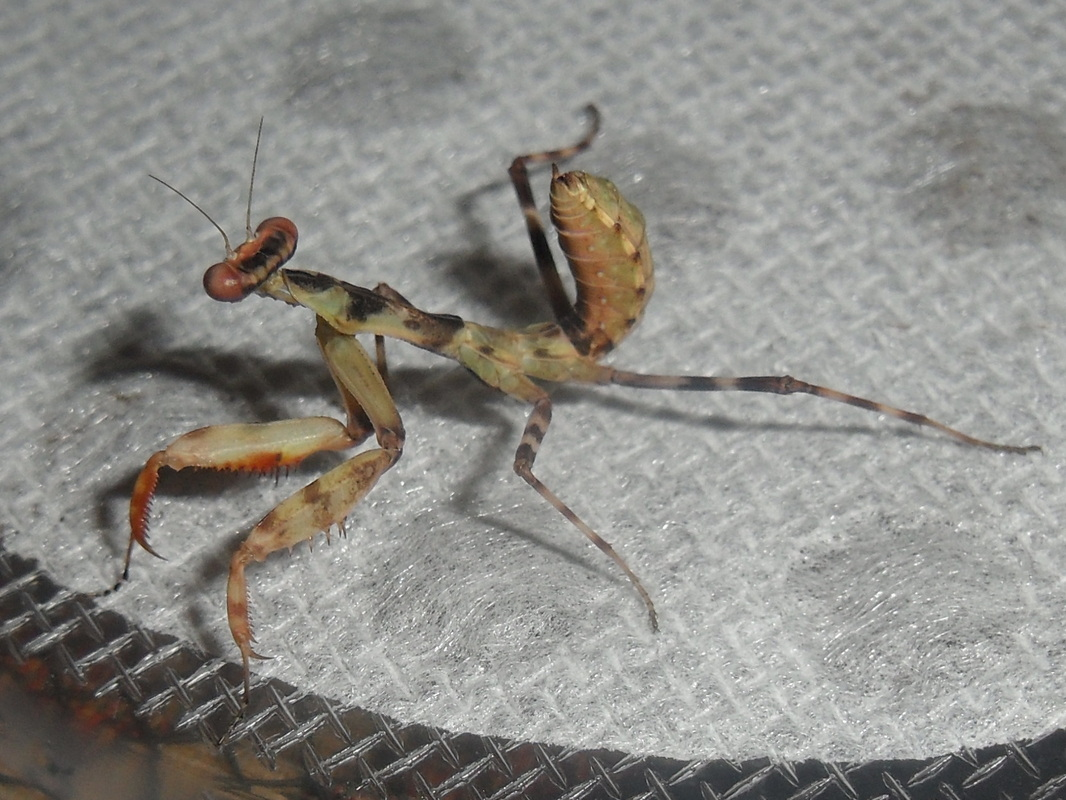
Female Pnigomantis medioconstricta L4 nymph

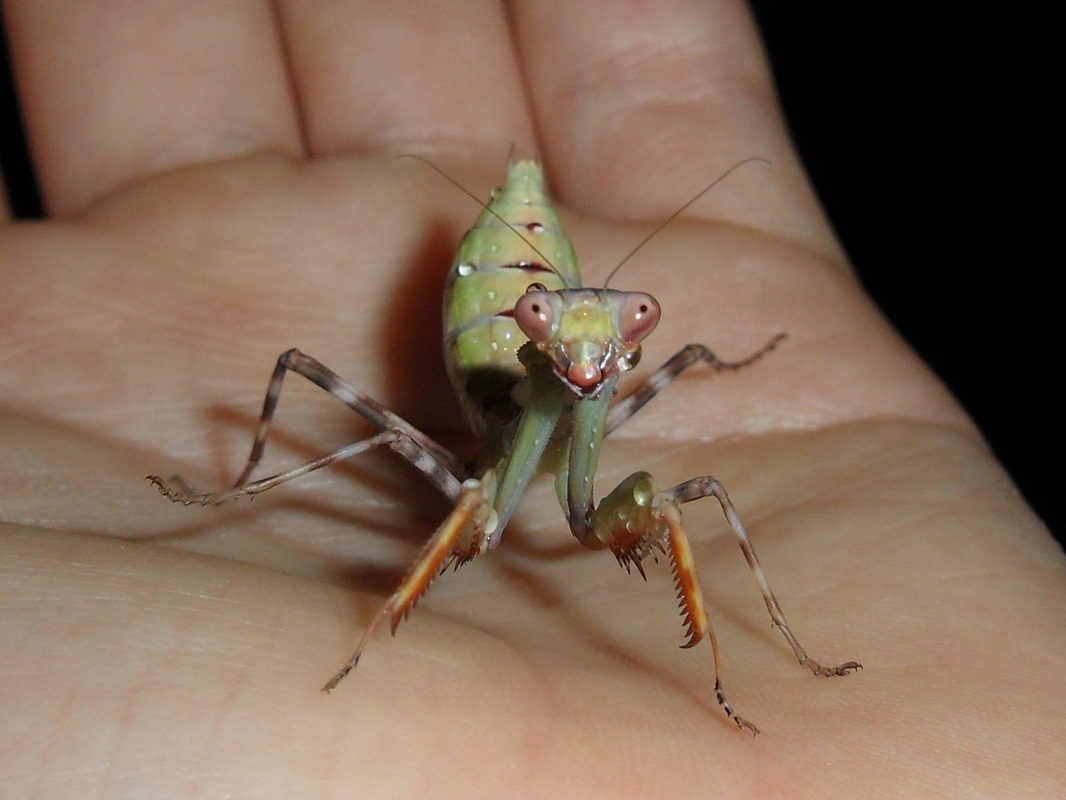
Female Pnigomantis medioconstricta L6 nymph

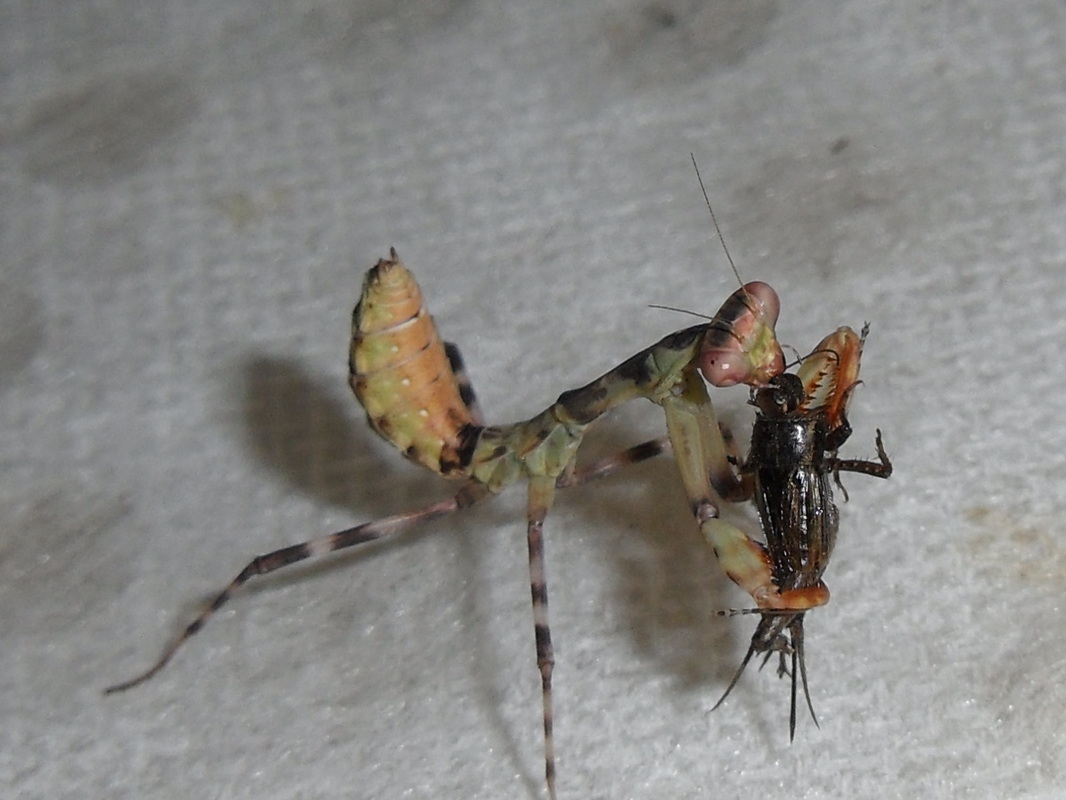
Female Pnigomantis medioconstricta L4 nymph eating a cricket

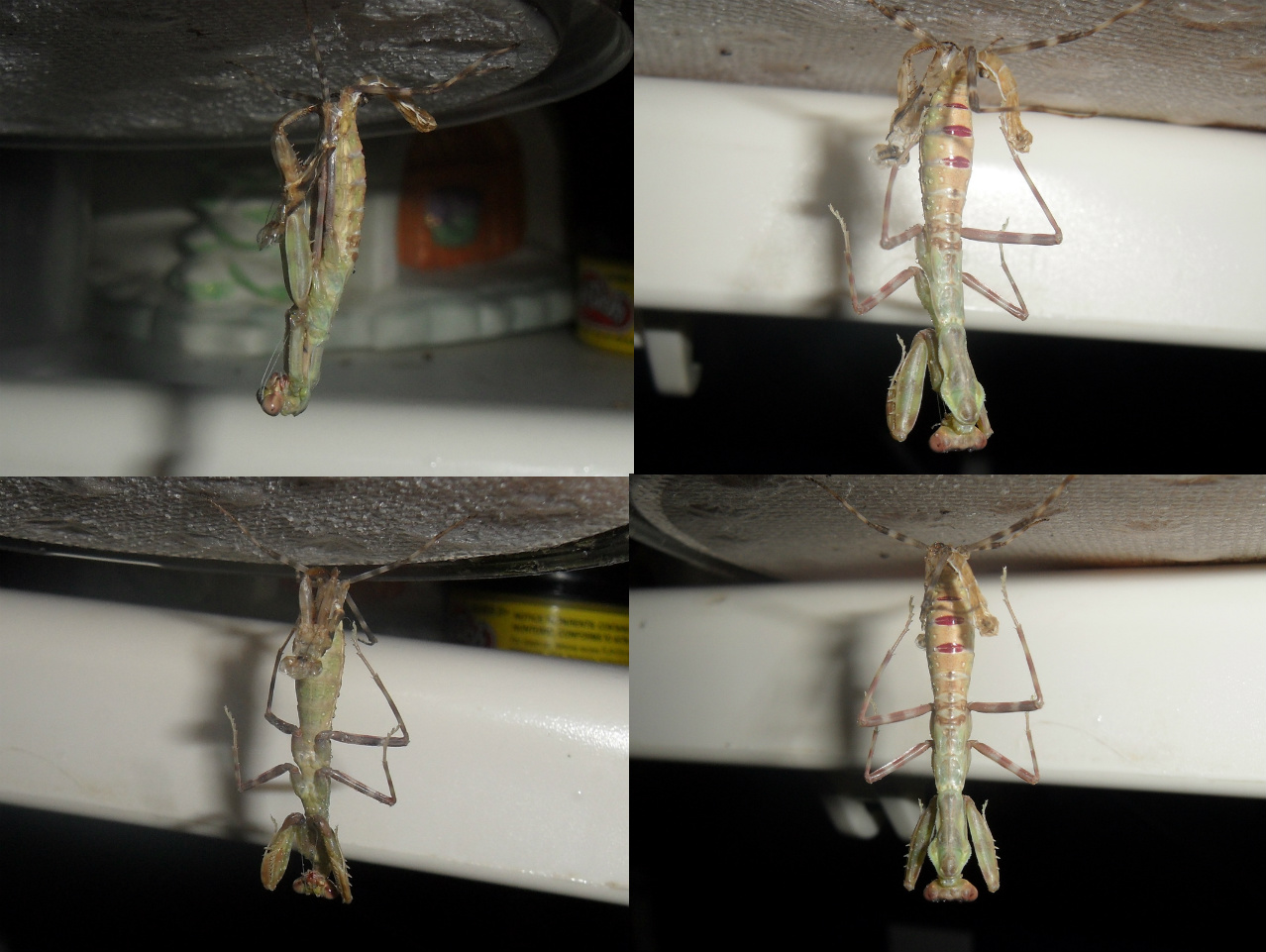
Female Pnigomantis medioconstricta L4 nymph molting to L5

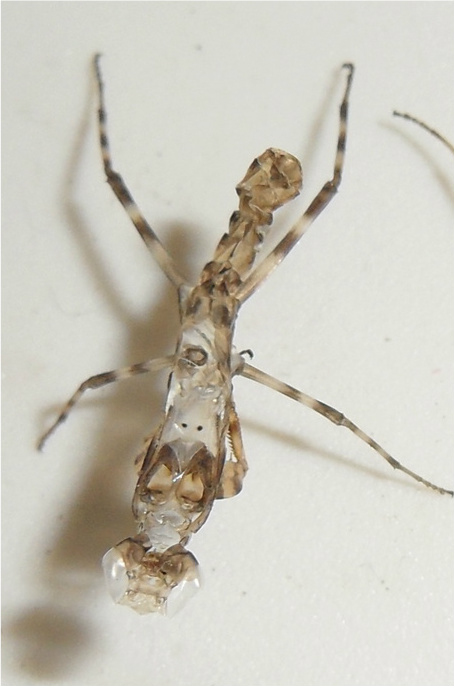
L4 molt
