= Sang piao xiao =

Praying mantis egg cases in traditional Chinese medicine

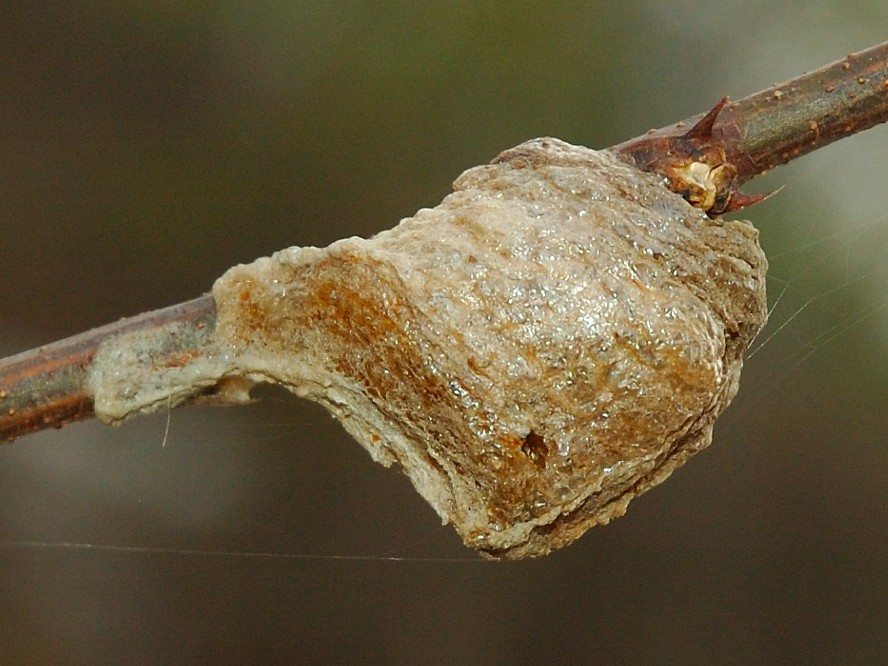
Mantis ootheca

Sang piao xiao or Sangpiaoxiao (Chinese: 桑螵蛸, sometimes called mantis cradle or ootheca mantidis in English) is a pinyin transliteration referring to the oothecae, or egg cases, of the praying mantis as an ingredient in traditional Chinese medicine. A formula based on this ingredient is known as sang piao xiao san (or sangpiaoxiao san) and is also known as "mantis formula" in English. The formula may also be sold as a pill (sang piao xiao wan).

== Varieties ==
The three most common varieties of sang piao xiao are:

- tuan piao xiao (round mantis egg case) made from the egg case of Tenodera sinensis
- chang piao xiao (long mantis egg case) made from the egg case of Statilia maculata
- hei piao xiao (black mantis egg case) made from the egg case of Hierodula patellifera

Royal jelly and silkworm droppings are other insect secretions used in traditional Chinese medicine.

== History ==
The use of praying mantis egg case as a medicine is described in the Shennong Bencao Jing, a pharmacological treatise on Chinese herbology from c. 100 AD. Their medicinal use might originate from their occasional occurrence on the mulberry plant Morus alba. As its leaves were necessary food for the caterpillars that make silk, much of the plant – including branches, fruits, leaves, and root bark – became revered in ancient China as sources of herbal medicine. Says one source, "it would not be surprising that these egg cases, which appeared on some of the plants, were also collected and considered a valuable medicine."

== Collection ==
Othecae are made by mantises in the late summer, and they are collected for medicinal use from then until early spring before when they hatch. The egg cases are steamed – killing the developing nymphs inside – and then sun dried or dried in an oven.
