= Melanocytic tumor =

Tumors of melanin-producing skin cells

Melanocytic tumors are tumors developed from melanocytes.

== Types ==
- Melanocytic nevus
- Melanocytic tumors of uncertain malignant potential
- Melanoma
