= Tanning agent =

A tanning agent is used for:

- Leather tanning, the process of treating skins and hides of animals to produce leather
- Sunless tanning, the effect of a suntan without the Sun
- Tanning activator, chemicals that increase the effect of UV-radiation on human skin
