= Blaptica sulina =

Scientific classification
- Kingdom: Animalia
- Phylum: Arthropoda
- Clade: Pancrustacea
- Class: Insecta
- Order: Blattodea
- Family: Blaberidae
- Genus: Blaptica
- Species: B. sulina

Binomial name
- Blaptica sulina Lopes & de Oliveira, 2005

Species of insect

Blaptica sulina is a species of cockroach in the family Blaberidae. It was first described in Brazil in 2005 by Lopes and de Oliveira.
