= Melanocytoma =

Rare benign tumor from large nevus cells

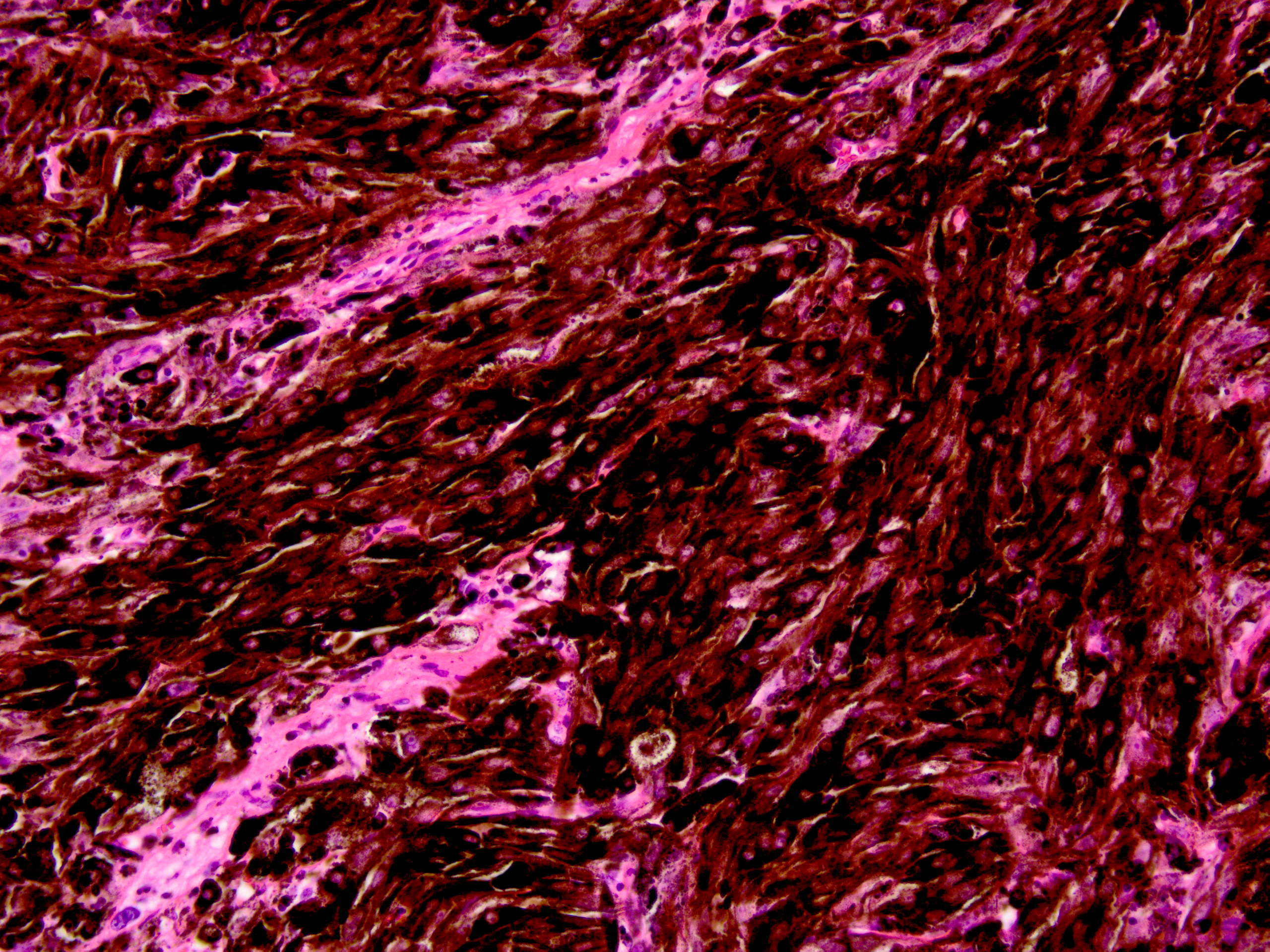

A melanocytoma is a rare pigmented tumor that has been described as a variant of the melanocytic nevus and is derived from the neural crest. The term "melanocytoma" was introduced by Limas and Tio in 1972.

== Histology ==
Histologically, the tumor is characterized by large, uniformly shaped polyhedral nevus cells that are pigmented and closely packed. Typically, it lacks signs of malignancy, such as a high mitotic rate, necrosis, or infiltrative growth. Similar to melanoma, it exhibits an immunohistochemical profile with S-100 protein-, vimentin-, and HMB-45-positive tumor cells.

== Optic melanocytoma ==
A melanocytoma most commonly occurs on or adjacent to the optic nerve as an optic melanocytoma. The lesion can be found at any age, and its location and size may lead to clinical symptoms. While melanocytomas are generally considered to be benign tumors, they have the potential for growth, recurrence, and transformation into melanoma. Because malignant transformation is rare, optic melanocytomas can usually be managed with observation. Therefore, in asymptomatic patients, regular monitoring via fundoscopy is recommended, potentially supported by ocular ultrasonography.

== Meningeal melanocytoma ==
A meningeal melanocytoma is a rare, pigmented tumor found on the leptomeninges of the brain, typically in the area of the base of the brain and brainstem, or the spine. Symptoms may be absent or related to the tumor's growth and location. Similar to optic melanocytomas, the main concerns include growth, recurrence, and malignant transformation. Meningeal melanocytomas account for 0.06-0.1% of brain tumors.

In a 2003 review of 95 cases by Rahimi-Movaghar et al., 45 were intracranial (mostly supratentorial) and 50 were spinal or located along spinal roots. The authors noted that the median age was 40 years for patients with intracranial tumors and 49 years for those with spinal tumors. The lesions were more common in women (57.9%). The review reported a recurrence rate of 26.3% and a mortality rate of 10.5% over a 46-month period.

A 2001 review by Rades et al. concluded that complete resection is the best treatment option. If resection is incomplete, postoperative radiotherapy is recommended.

== Differential diagnosis ==
Pigmented tumors can raise concerns about the possibility of a melanoma, a condition that may present both diagnostic and therapeutic challenges. In the differential diagnosis, other conditions such as schwannoma and meningioma with pigmentation should also be considered.

== Veterinary medicine ==
Melanocytomas have been described in animals, including dogs and cats.

== See also ==
- Dermal melanocytoma
- Melanocytic tumors of uncertain malignant potential
