= Melanocyte =

Melanin-producing cells of the skin

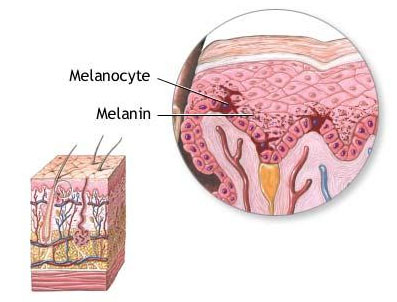
- Melanocyte and melanin

Details
- Pronunciation: /məˈlænəˌsaɪt, -noʊ-/ or /ˈmɛlənəˌsaɪt, -noʊ-/
- Precursor: Neural crest
- Location: Skin
- Function: Melanin production

Identifiers
- Latin: melanocytus
- MeSH: D008544
- TH: H2.00.03.0.01016
- FMA: 70545

Melanocytes are melanin-producing neural crest-derived cells located in the bottom layer (the stratum basale) of the skin's epidermis, the middle layer of the eye (the uvea), the inner ear, vaginal epithelium, meninges, bones, and heart found in many mammals and birds. Melanin is a dark pigment primarily responsible for skin color. Once synthesized, melanin is contained in special organelles called melanosomes which can be transported to nearby keratinocytes to induce pigmentation. Thus darker skin tones have more melanosomes present than lighter skin tones. Functionally, melanin serves as protection against UV radiation. Melanocytes also have a role in the immune system.

== Function ==
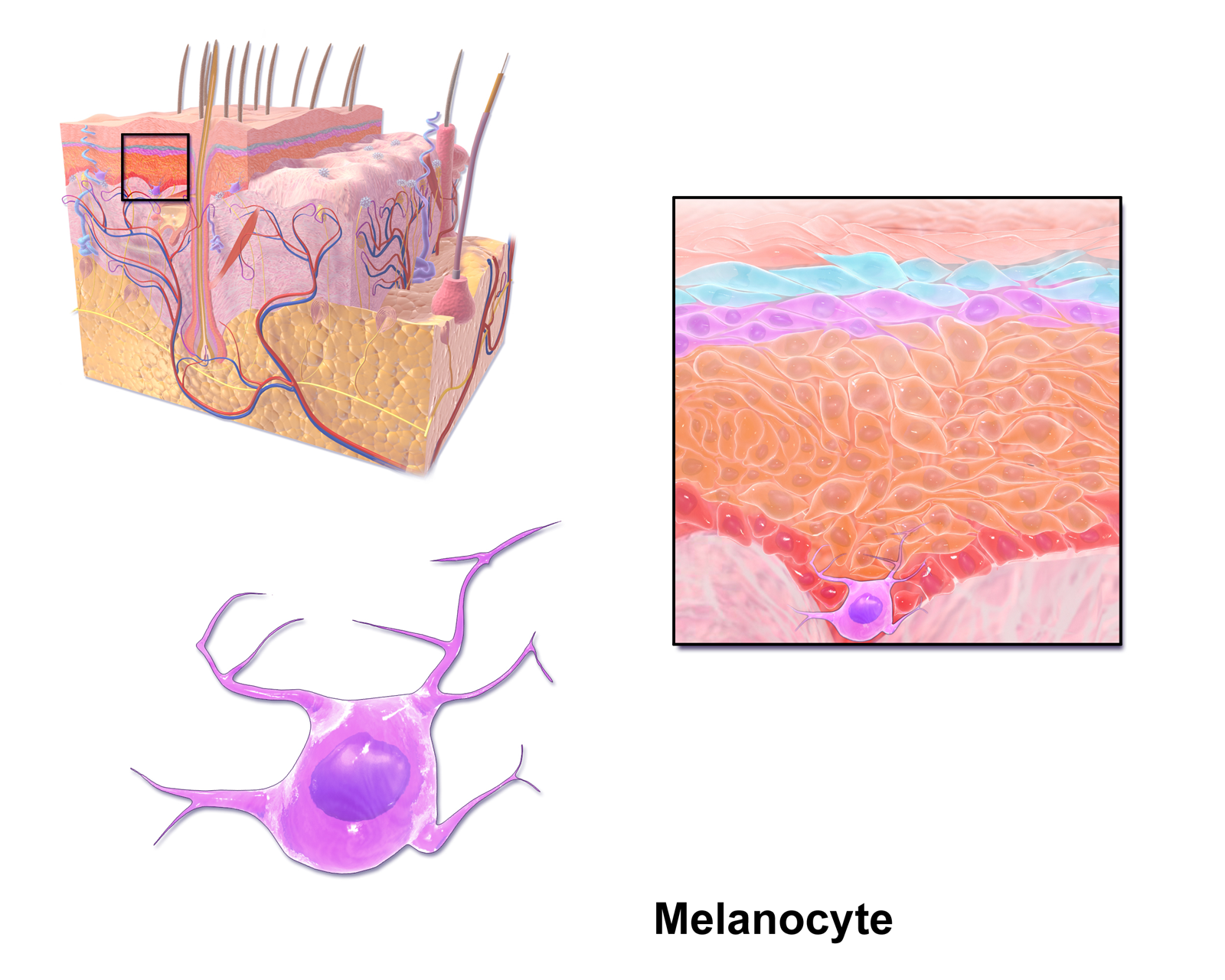
Illustration of a melanocyte

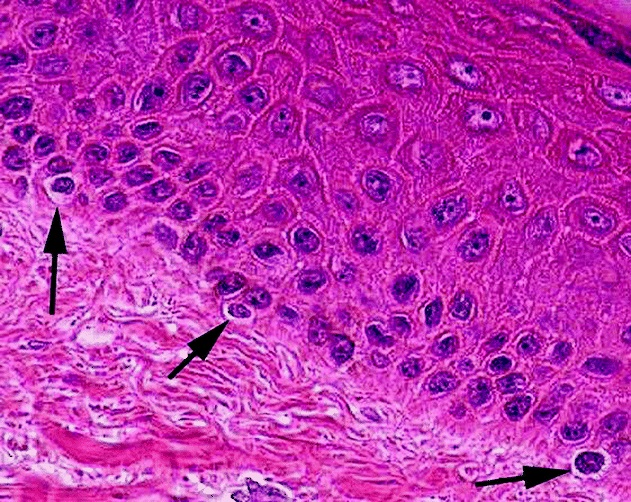
Micrograph of melanocytes in the epidermis

Through a process called melanogenesis, melanocytes produce melanin, which is a pigment found in the skin, eyes, hair, nasal cavity, and inner ear. This melanogenesis leads to a long-lasting pigmentation, which is in contrast to the pigmentation that originates from oxidation of already-existing melanin.

There are both basal and activated levels of melanogenesis; in general, lighter-skinned people have low basal levels of melanogenesis. Exposure to UV-B radiation causes increased melanogenesis. The purpose of melanogenesis is to protect the hypodermis, the layer under the skin, from damage by UV radiation. The color of the melanin is black, allowing it to absorb a majority of the UV light and block it from passing through the epidermis.

Since the action spectrum of sunburn and melanogenesis are virtually identical, they are assumed to be induced by the same mechanism. The agreement of the action spectrum with the absorption spectrum of DNA points towards the formation of cyclobutane pyrimidine dimers (CPDs) - direct DNA damage.

Typically, between 1000 and 2000 melanocytes are found per square millimeter of skin or approximately 5% to 10% of the cells in the basal layer of epidermis. Although their size can vary, melanocytes are typically 7 μm in length.

Both lightly and darkly pigmented skin contain similar numbers of melanocytes, with difference in skin color due to differences the packing of eumelanin into the melanosomes of keratinocytes: those in dark-toned skin are "packaged into peri-nuclear distributed, ellipsoid" melanosomes while those light-tone skin are "assembled into clustered small, circular melanosomes". There are also differences in the quantity and relative amounts of eumelanin and pheomelanin. Pigmentation including tanning is under hormonal control, including the MSH and ACTH peptides that are produced from the precursor proopiomelanocortin.

Vitiligo is a skin disease where people lack melanin in certain areas in the skin.

People with oculocutaneous albinism typically have a very low level of melanin production. Albinism is often but not always related to the TYR gene coding the tyrosinase enzyme. Tyrosinase is required for melanocytes to produce melanin from the amino acid tyrosine. Albinism may be caused by a number of other genes as well, like OCA2, SLC45A2, TYRP1, and HPS1 to name some. In all, already 17 types of oculocutaneous albinism have been recognized. Each gene is related to different protein having a role in pigment production.

People with Chédiak–Higashi syndrome have a buildup of melanin granules due to abnormal function of microtubules.

== Role in the immune system ==
In addition to their role as UV radical scavengers, melanocytes are also part of the immune system, and are considered to be immune cells. Although the full role of melanocytes in immune response is not fully understood, melanocytes share many characteristics with dendritic cells: branched morphology; phagocytic capabilities; presentation of antigens to T-cells; and production and release of cytokines. Although melanocytes are dendritic in form and share many characteristics with dendritic cells, they derive from different cell lineages. Dendritic cells are derived from hematopoietic stem cells in the bone marrow. Melanocytes on the other hand originate from neural crest cells. As such, although morphologically and functionally similar, melanocytes and dendritic cells are not the same.

Melanocytes are capable of expressing MHC Class II, a type of MHC expressed only by certain antigen presenting cells of the immune system, when stimulated by interactions with antigen or cytokines. All cells in any given vertebrate express MHC, but most cells only express MHC class I. The other class of MHC, Class II, is found only on "professional" antigen presenting cells such as dendritic cells, macrophages, B cells, and melanocytes. Importantly, melanocytes stimulated by cytokines express surface proteins such as CD40 and ICAM1 in addition to MHC class II, allowing for co-stimulation of T cells.

In addition to presenting antigen, one of the roles of melanocytes in the immune response is cytokine production. Melanocytes express many proinflammatory cytokines including IL-1, IL-3, IL-6, IL-8, TNF-α, and TGF-β. Like other immune cells, melanocytes secrete these cytokines in response to activation of Pattern Recognition Receptors (PRRs) such as Toll Like Receptor 4 (TLR4) which recognize MAMPs. MAMPs, also known as PAMPs, are microbial associated molecular patterns, small molecular elements such as proteins, carbohydrates, and lipids present on or in a given pathogen. In addition, cytokine production by melanocytes can be triggered by cytokines secreted by other nearby immune cells.

Melanocytes are ideally positioned in the epidermis to be sentinels against harmful pathogens. They reside in the stratum basale, the lowest layer of the epidermis, but they use their dendrites to interact with cells in other layers, and to capture pathogens that enter the epidermis. They likely work in concert with both keratinocytes and Langerhans cells, both of which are also actively phagocytic, to contribute to the immune response.

=== Melanogenesis ===
Skin tanning occurs with melanin production when external UV light triggers surrounding skin cells to release α-MSH hormones.

Tyrosine is the non-essential amino acid precursor of melanin. Tyrosine is converted to dihydroxyphenylalanine (DOPA) via the enzyme tyrosinase. Then DOPA is polymerized into melanin. The copper-ion based enzyme-catalyzed oxidative transformation of catechol derivative dopa to light absorbing dopaquinone to indole-5,6-quinone is clearly seen following the polymerization to melanin, the color of the pigment ranges from red to dark brown.

==== Stimulation ====
Numerous stimuli are able to alter melanogenesis, or the production of melanin by cultured melanocytes, although the method by which it works is not fully understood. Increased melanin production is seen in conditions where adrenocorticotropic hormone (ACTH) is elevated, such as Addison's and Cushing's disease. This is mainly a consequence of alpha-MSH being secreted along with the hormone associated with reproductive tendencies in primates. Alpha-MSH is a cleavage product of ACTH that has an equal affinity for the MC1 receptor on melanocytes as ACTH.

Melanosomes are vesicles that package the chemical inside a plasma membrane. The melanosomes are organized as a cap protecting the nucleus of the keratinocyte. When ultraviolet rays penetrate the skin and damage DNA, thymidine dinucleotide (pTpT) fragments from damaged DNA will trigger melanogenesis and cause the melanocyte to produce melanosomes, which are then transferred by dendrites to the top layer of keratinocytes.

=== Stem cells ===
The precursor of the melanocyte is the melanoblast. In adults, stem cells are contained in the bulge area of the outer root sheath of hair follicles. When a hair is lost and the hair follicle regenerates, the stem cells are activated. These stem cells develop into both keratinocyte precursors and melanoblasts - and these melanoblasts supply both hair and skin (moving into the basal layer of the epidermis). There is additionally evidence that melanocyte stem cells are present in cutaneous nerves, with nerve signals causing these cells to differentiate into melanocytes for the skin.

== Clinical significance ==
- Melanoma - Cancer affecting melanocytes
- Melanocytic tumors
- Melanocytic tumors of uncertain malignant potential
- Vitiligo - Decreased number of melanocytes due to autoimmune destruction causing decreased melanin
- Albinism - Normal number of melanocytes, but decreased melanin production due to decreased tyrosinase activity or defective tyrosine transport
- Melasma (Chloasma) - Patchy hyperpigmentation of the skin Normal number of melanocytes with increased melanin production causing hyperpigmentation. Associated with pregnancy or oral contraceptive pill use.
- Addison disease
- Nevus depigmentosus

== See also ==
- Chromatophore (the pigment cell type found in poikilotherm animals)
- Eye color
- Mole (skin marking)
- Tanning activator
- List of distinct cell types in the adult human body
- List of human cell types derived from the germ layers
