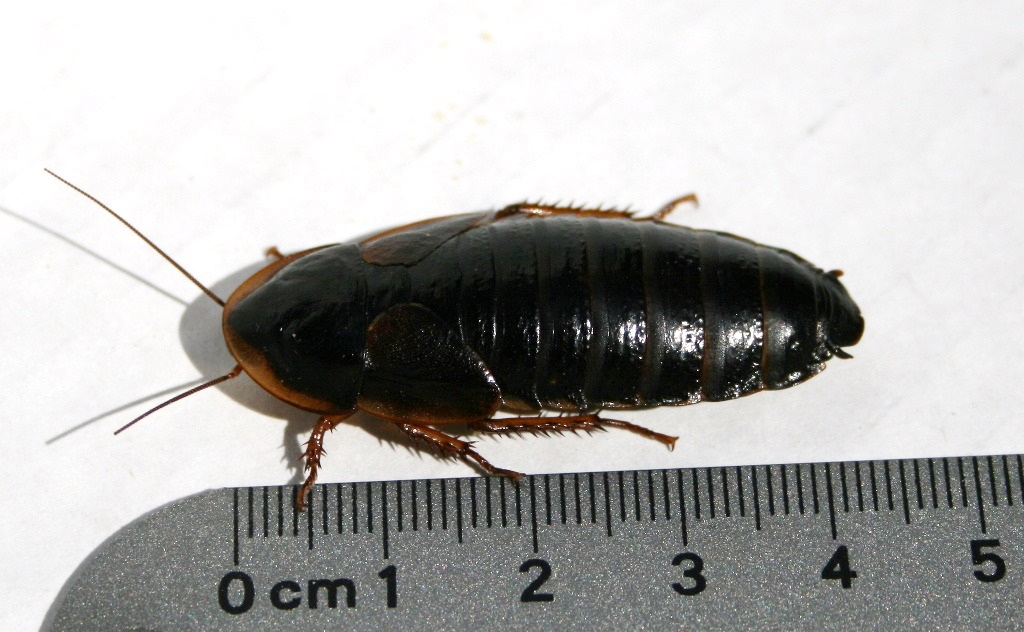
- Blaptica dubia

Scientific classification
- Kingdom: Animalia
- Phylum: Arthropoda
- Clade: Pancrustacea
- Class: Insecta
- Order: Blattodea
- Family: Blaberidae
- Subfamily: Blaberinae
- Genus: Blaptica; Stål, 1874

Species
- See text

= Blaptica =

Genus of Blattodea

Blaptica is a genus of Blattodea (cockroaches) in the family Blaberidae, subfamily Blaberinae.

== Species ==
There are 17 species:

- Blaptica argentina Hepper, 1967
- Blaptica aurorae Hepper, 1966
- Blaptica confusa Lopes & de Oliveira, 2005
- Blaptica daguerrei Hepper, 1968
- Blaptica dubia (Serville, 1839)
- Blaptica dureti Hepper, 1968
- Blaptica fernandezi Hepper, 1966
- Blaptica formosa Lopes & de Oliveira, 2005
- Blaptica gaucha Lopes & de Oliveira, 2005
- Blaptica haywardi Hepper, 1967
- Blaptica ibarrai Hepper, 1968
- Blaptica interior Hebard, 1921
- Blaptica obscura (Saussure & Zehntner, 1894)
- Blaptica pereyrai Hepper, 1965
- Blaptica rothi Lopes & de Oliveira, 2005
- Blaptica sulina Lopes & de Oliveira, 2005
- Blaptica vianai Hepper, 1967
