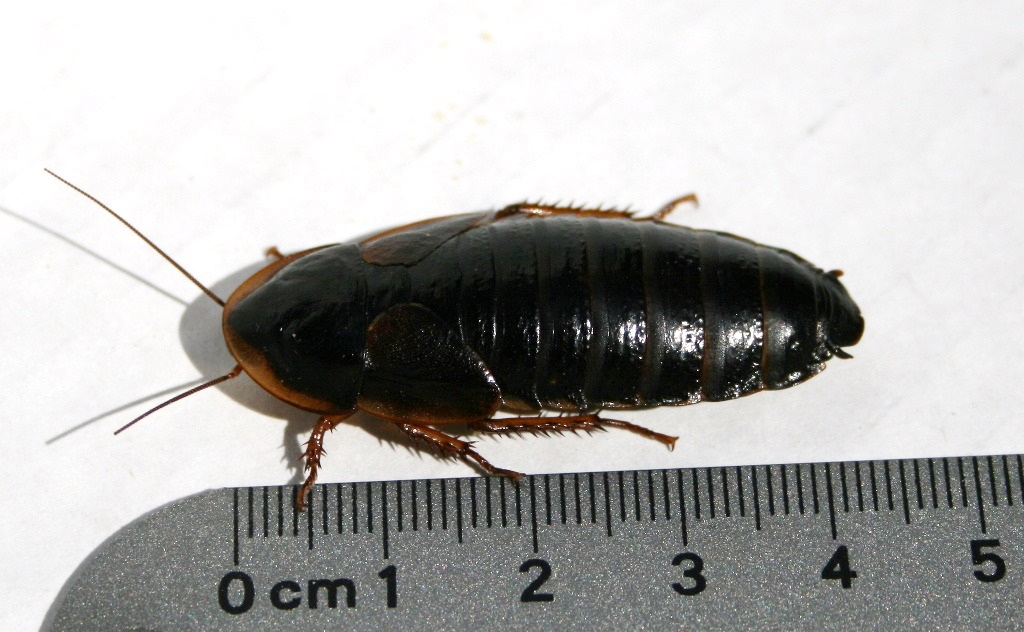

Scientific classification
- Kingdom: Animalia
- Phylum: Arthropoda
- Clade: Pancrustacea
- Class: Insecta
- Order: Blattodea
- Family: Blaberidae
- Genus: Blaptica
- Species: B. dubia

Binomial name
- Blaptica dubia Serville, 1838

Synonyms
- Blabera claraziana Saussure 1864; Blabera ligata Brunner von Wattenwyl, 1865; Blabera dubia Serville, 1838

= Blaptica dubia =

Species of cockroach

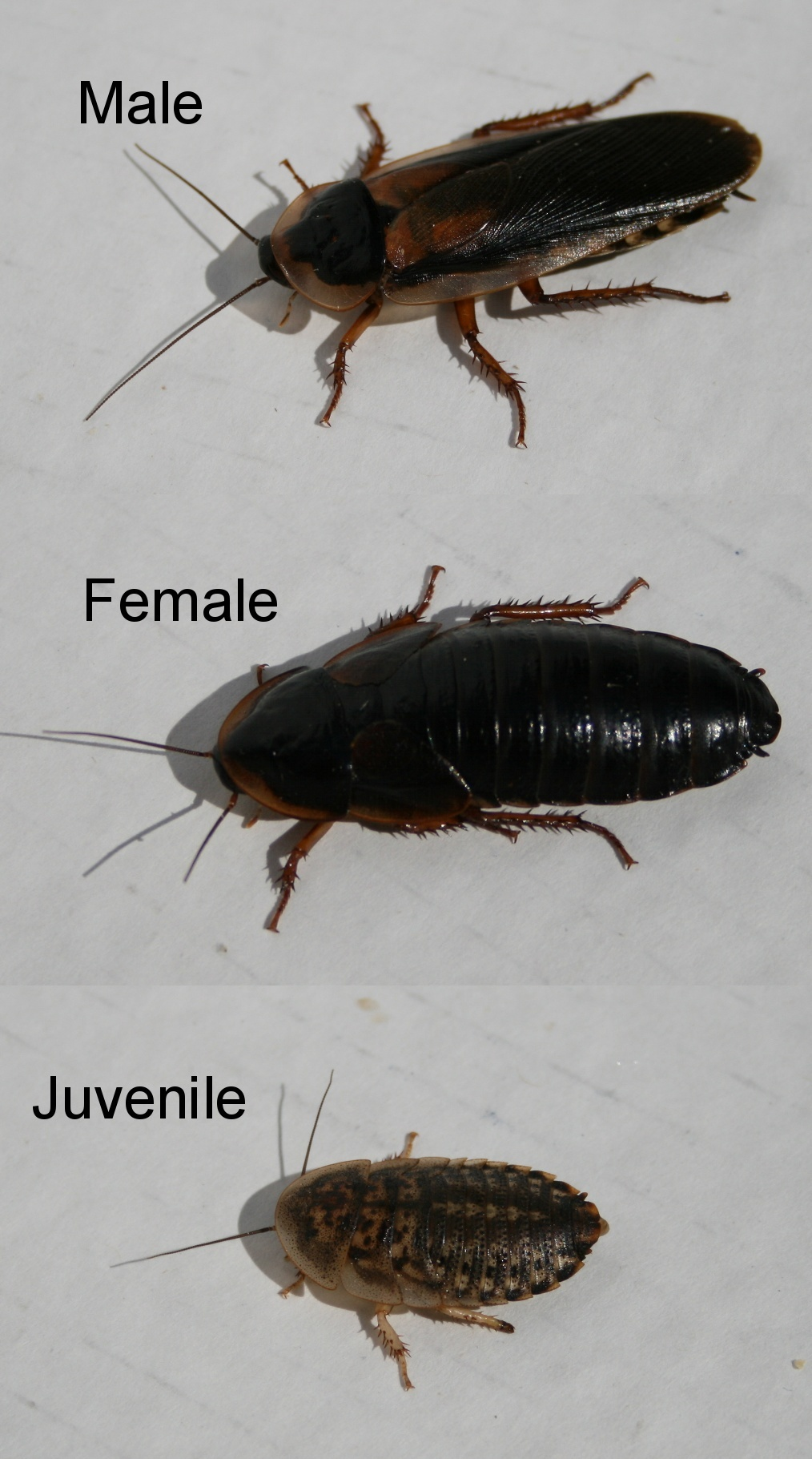
Dubia cockroaches: Adult Male, Adult Female, and Juvenile.

Blaptica dubia, the dubia roach, orange-spotted roach, Guyana spotted roach, or Argentinian wood roach, is a medium-sized species of cockroach which grows to around 40–45 mm (1.6–1.8 in).

== Description ==
They are sexually dimorphic; adult males have full wings covering their body, while females have only tiny wing stubs - their tegmina (forewings) being around a fourth of their body length. Adults are dark brown to black with somewhat lighter orange spot/stripe patterning sometimes visible only in bright light. Coloration differs slightly with environment and diet from one colony to another.

Blaptica dubia are partially ovoviviparous, giving birth to live young after eggs hatch inside the female, and can give birth to 20 to 40 nymphs per month under favorable conditions.

== Distribution ==
The dubia cockroach is found in southern parts of South America. Documented specimens have been found in Brazil, Argentina, and Uruguay.

== Flight ==
While rarely known to fly, adult males have fully developed wings and pigmented musculature typical of cockroaches able to meet the rapid energy requirements of sustained flight. In laboratory test launches from a ramp 2.5 m high, adult male B. dubia were able to right their dorso-ventral position and rapidly deploy their wings to control and direct their descent; however, active powered flight did not maintain or increase their altitude. Adult females have only rudimentary forewings and lack the muscles required for flight, and showed no flight control in test launches.

== Climbing ==
Neither adults nor juveniles can climb smooth, vertical surfaces, since they do not have a developed arolium.

== Reproduction ==
Blaptica dubia is an ovoviviparous species, generally giving birth to live young, and pregnancy in one study lasted 48–64 days, in a 26°C (78.8°F) environment with alternating 12-hour light and dark photoperiods. It carries the ootheca (egg capsule), which holds about 20-35 eggs, until they are ready to hatch, or may drop it earlier under stress conditions. Adults live for up to 2 years, females slightly longer than males. Growth and reproduction rates are sensitive to environmental conditions, optimally 25–30°C and above 60% relative humidity.

== Use as feeder insect ==
Blaptica dubia has become a popular feeder insect, particularly among tarantula, amphibian, and reptile enthusiasts and owners. Keeping or breeding the insect is made easier by their inability to jump or climb smooth surfaces, relatively slow movement, and rarity of flying. They are also quiet, unlike crickets, and tropical environmental requirements reduce the likelihood of establishment of escapees in colder, dryer climates. B. dubia can cause allergic reactions in humans, although they produce relatively little odor compared to many cockroaches.

A study found other cockroaches (Turkestan ("red runner") cockroaches, Madagascar hissing cockroaches,) provided a high-protein, low fat nutrition composition similar to crickets, more so than mealworms or superworm larvae provide. The gut contents of the cockroach, depending on its diet, may provide essential nutrients unavailable from a cockroach with an empty gut. Vitamin and mineral content in studied cockroaches was well represented except for low calcium:phosphorus ratios typical in cockroaches, and relatively low vitamin A and E in captive cockroaches. Supplementation of these nutrients in feeder cockroaches may be advisable.

=== Legality ===
Canada and some US states do not allow importation by the general public of B. dubia, considered by some as an invasive species. A Florida man was arrested on felony charges in 2011, related to ordering 500 B. dubia over the internet using a doctored permit, typically issued to researchers.
