= Blaptica argentina =

Scientific classification
- Kingdom: Animalia
- Phylum: Arthropoda
- Clade: Pancrustacea
- Class: Insecta
- Order: Blattodea
- Family: Blaberidae
- Genus: Blaptica
- Species: B. argentina

Binomial name
- Blaptica argentina Hepper, 1967

Species of insect

Blaptica argentina is a species of cockroach in the family Blaberidae. It was found for first time in 1967 by Hepper.
