= Ootheca =

Type of egg mass made by some molluscs, mantises and cockroaches

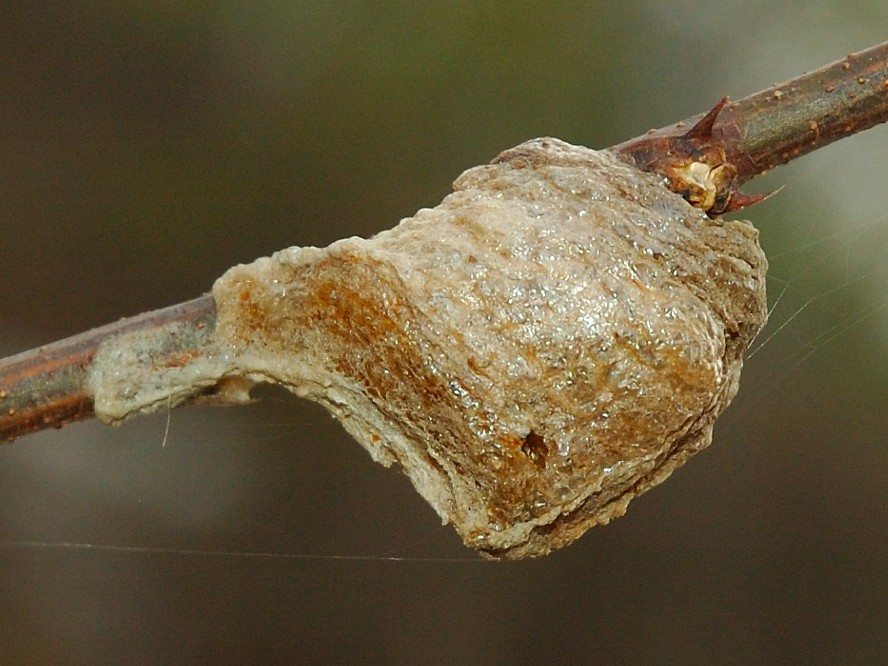
Mantis ootheca

An ootheca /oʊ.əˈθiːkə/ (pl.: oothecae /oʊ.əˈθiːsiː/) is a type of egg capsule made by any member of a variety of animal groups such as mollusks, mantises, and cockroaches. It is also referred to by its shortened nickname, "ooth".

== Etymology ==
The word is a Latinized combination of oo-, meaning "egg", from the Greek word ōon (cf. Latin ovum), and theca, meaning a "cover" or "container", from the Greek theke. Ootheke is Greek for ovary.

== Structure ==
Oothecae are made up of structural proteins and tanning agents that cause the protein to harden around the eggs, providing protection and stability. The production of oothecae convergently evolved across numerous insect species due to a selection for protection from parasites and other forms of predation, as the complex structure of the shell casing provides an evolutionary reproductive advantage (although the fitness and lifespan also depend on other factors such as the temperature of the incubating ootheca). Oothecae are most notably found in the orders Blattodea (cockroaches) and Mantodea (praying mantises), as well as in the subfamilies Cassidinae (Coleoptera) and Corinninae (Phasmatodea).

== Functions ==
The ootheca protects the eggs from microorganisms, parasitoids, predators, and exposure. Its composition and appearance vary depending on species and environment.

== Image gallery ==
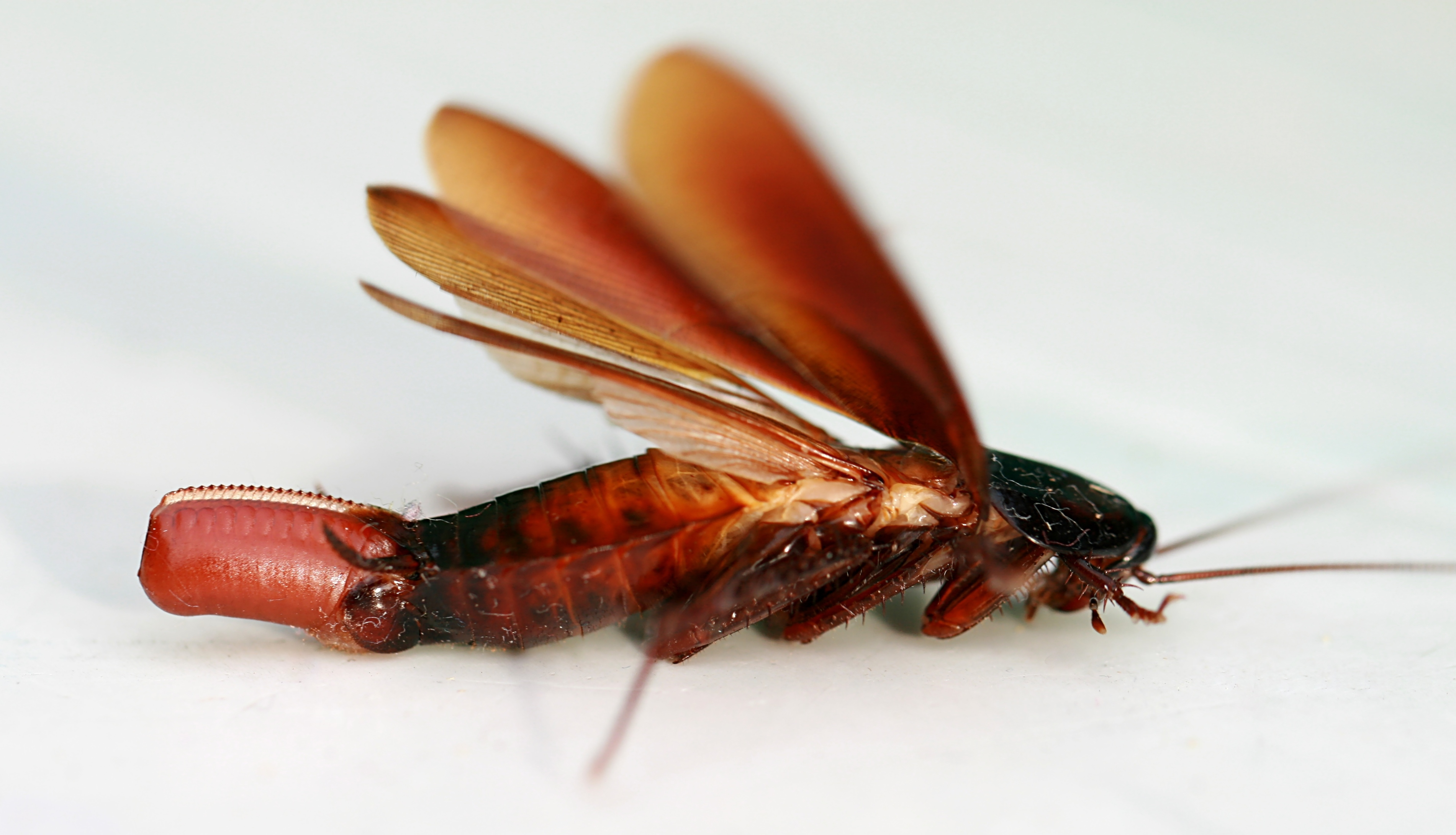
Female cockroach (Periplaneta americana) discharging ootheca

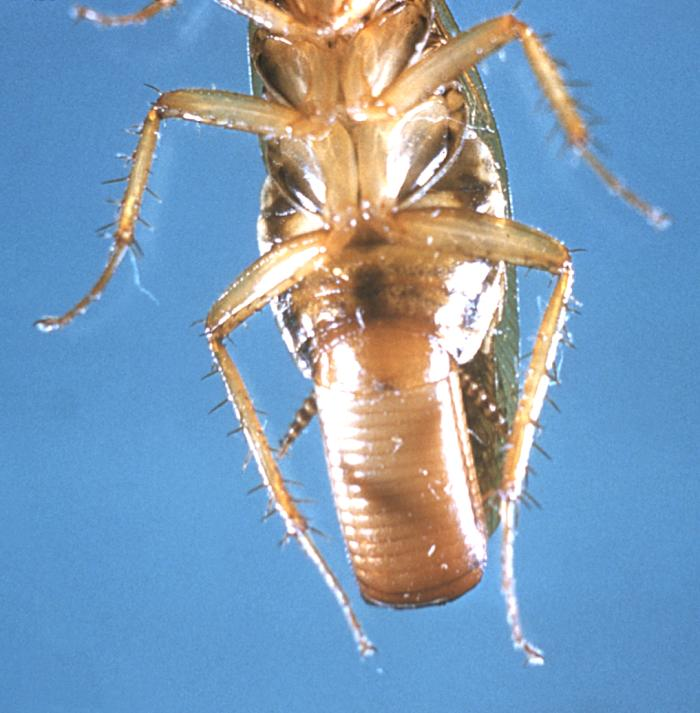
Female cockroach (Blatella germanica) discharging ootheca

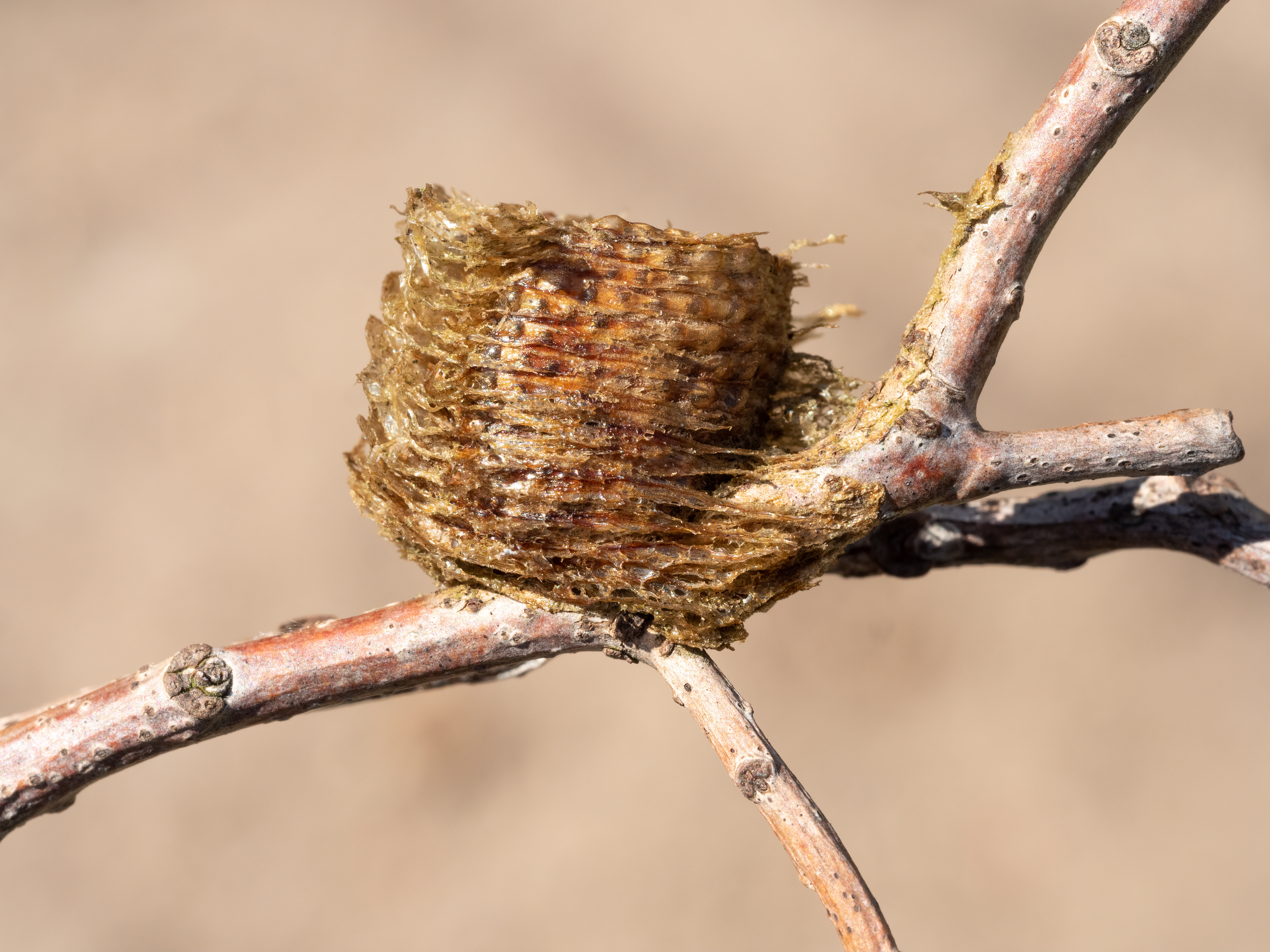
Chinese mantis (Tenodera sinensis) ootheca

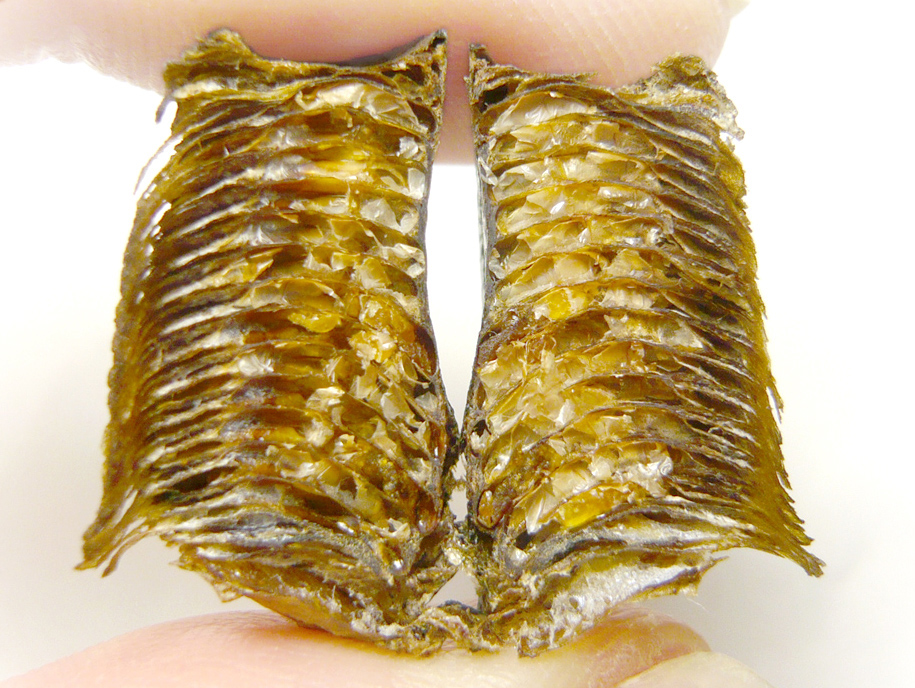
Sagittal section of hatched-out mantis ootheca (Hierodula patellifera)

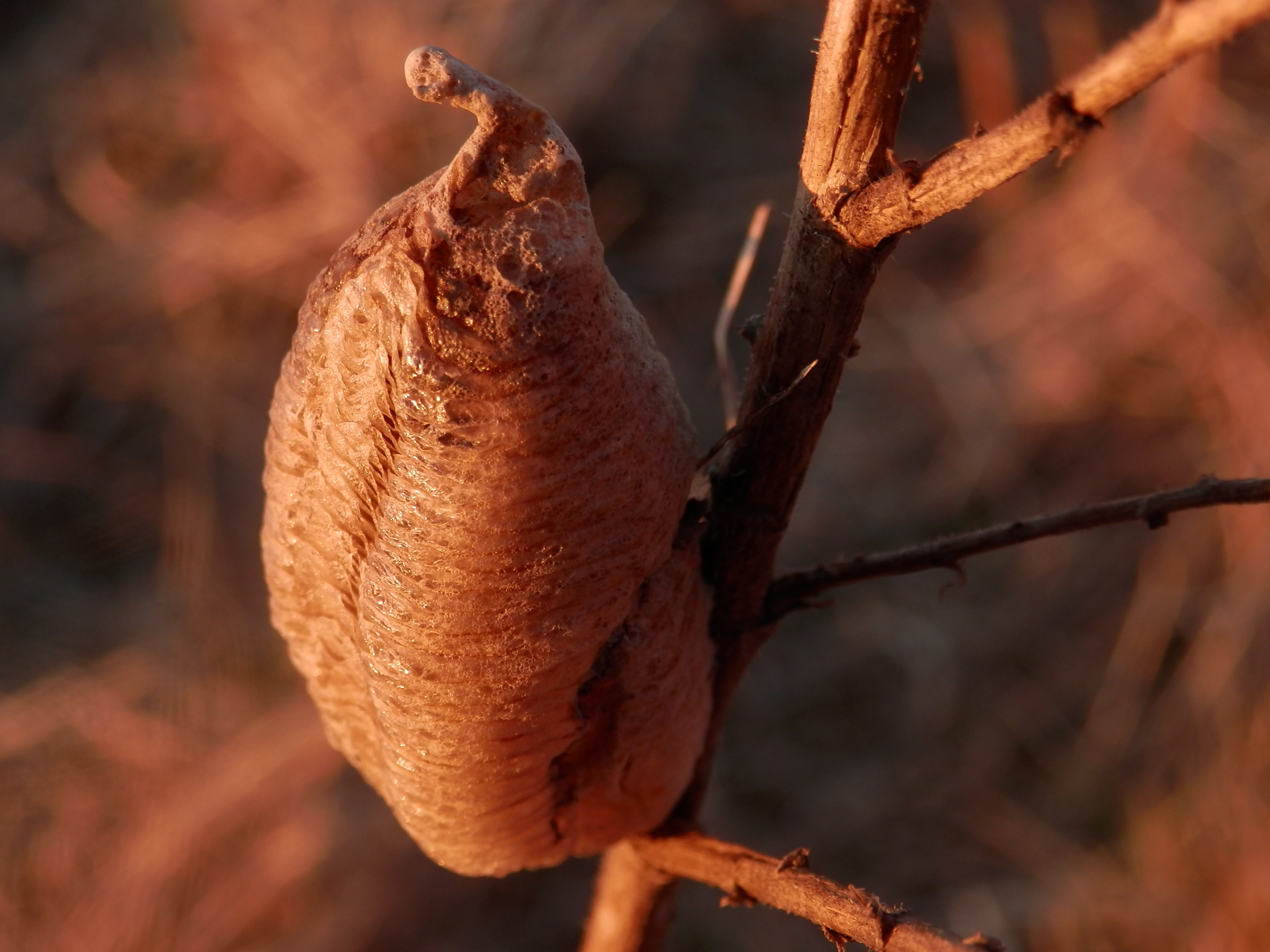
Praying mantis (Mantis religiosa) ootheca in Ontario, Canada.

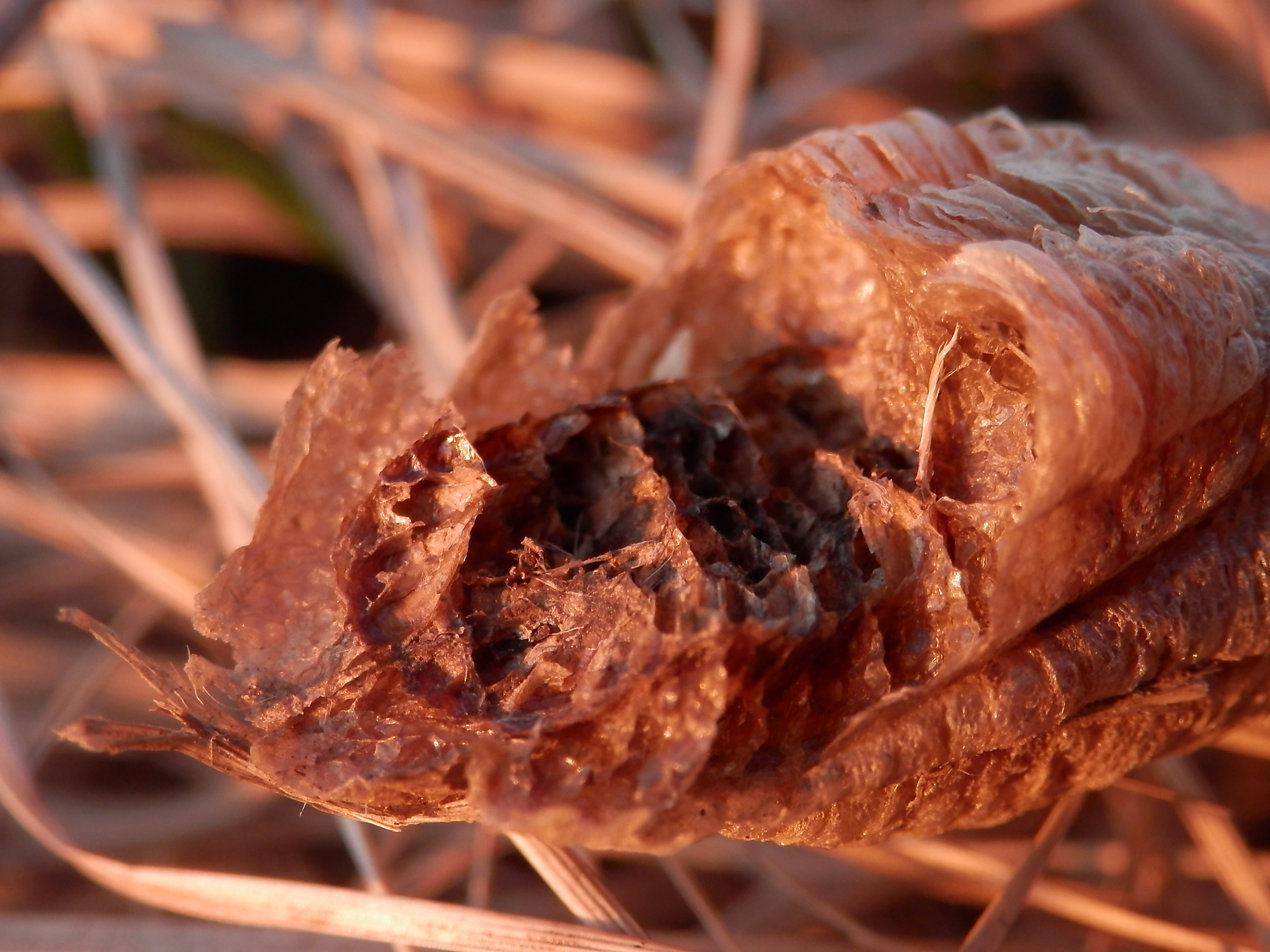
Damaged praying mantis (Mantis religiosa) ootheca in Ontario, Canada.

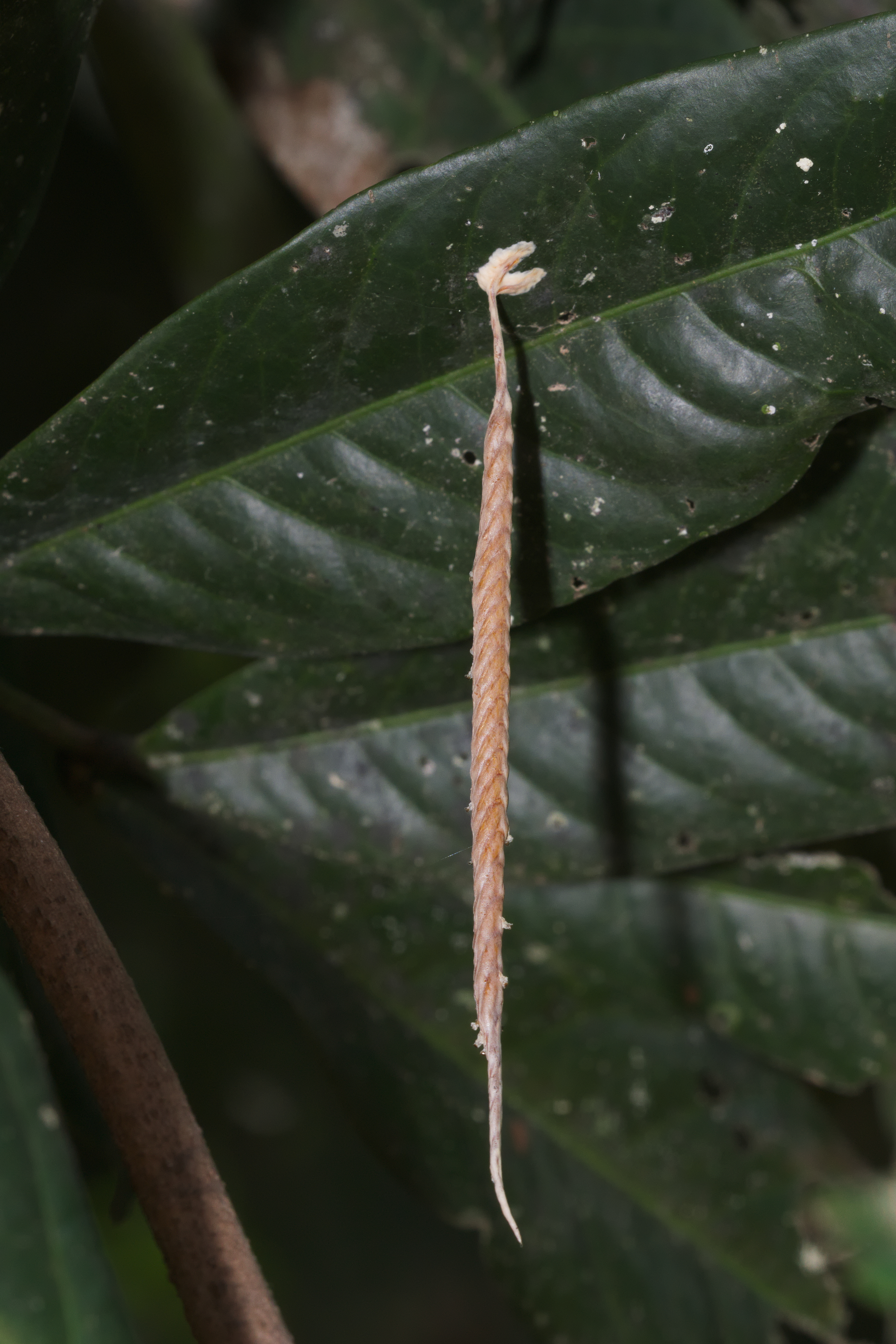
Praying mantis ootheca in Kerala, India

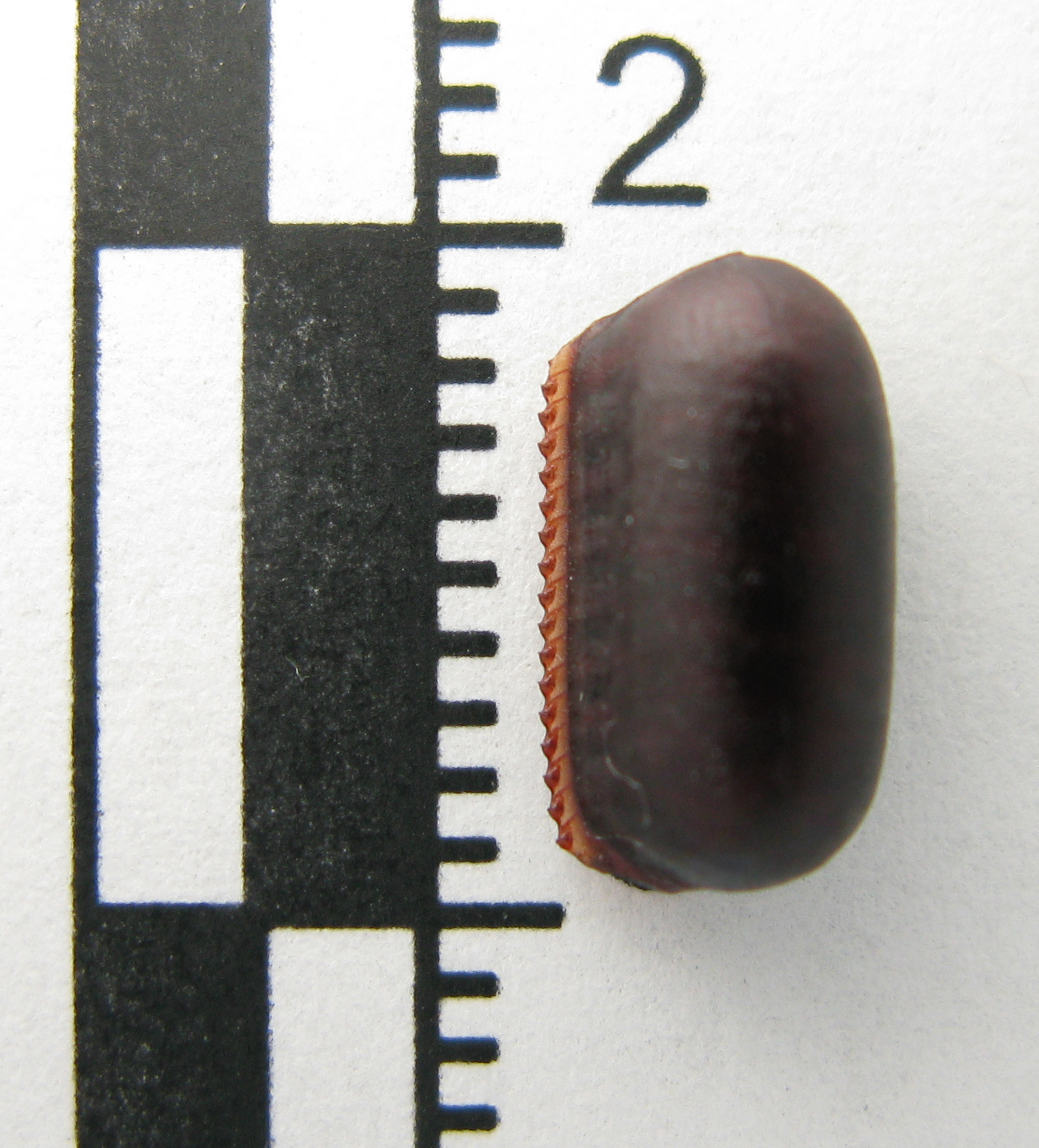
Ootheca of a blattodean

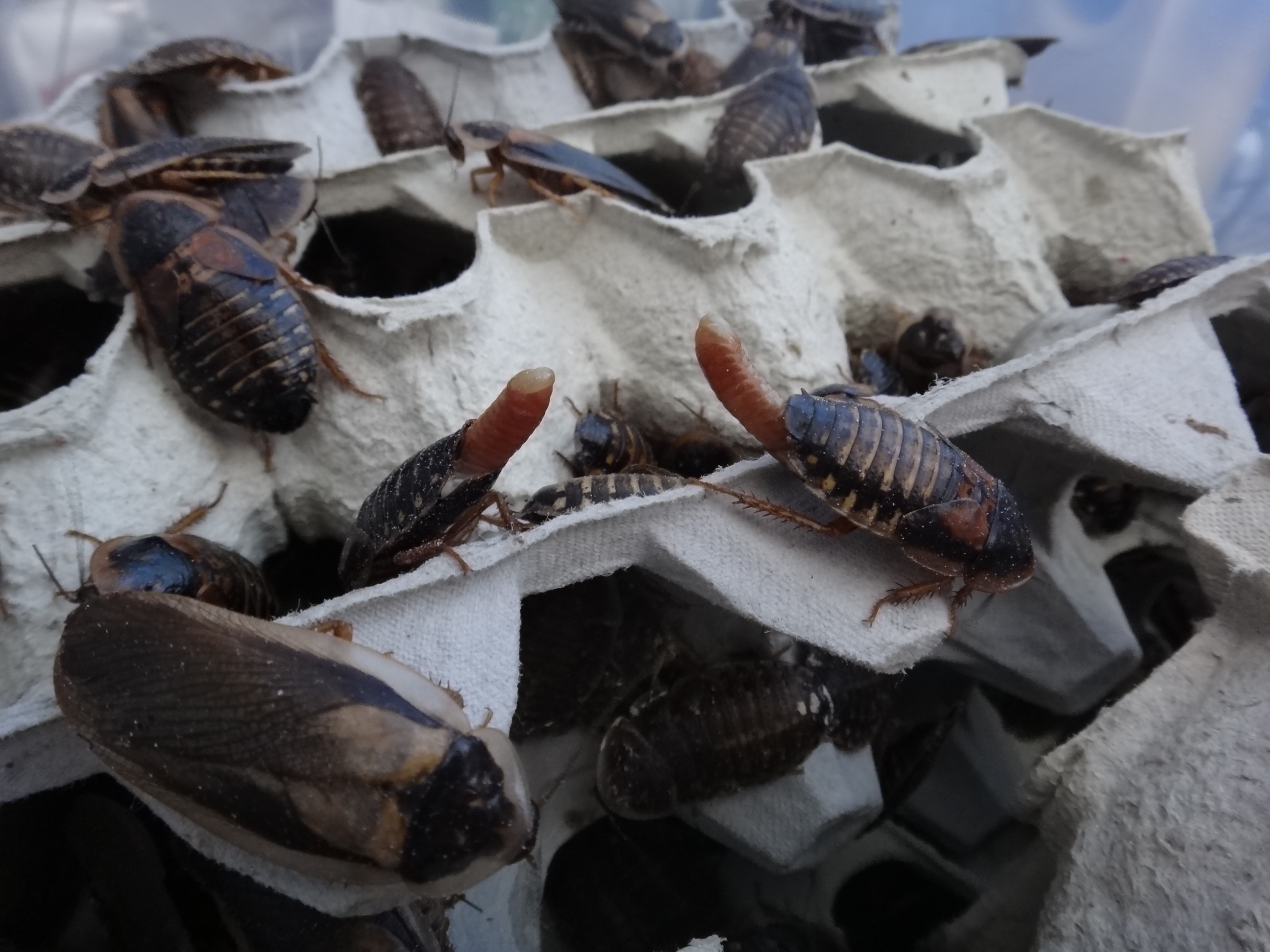
Blaptica dubia ootheca in an artificial colony

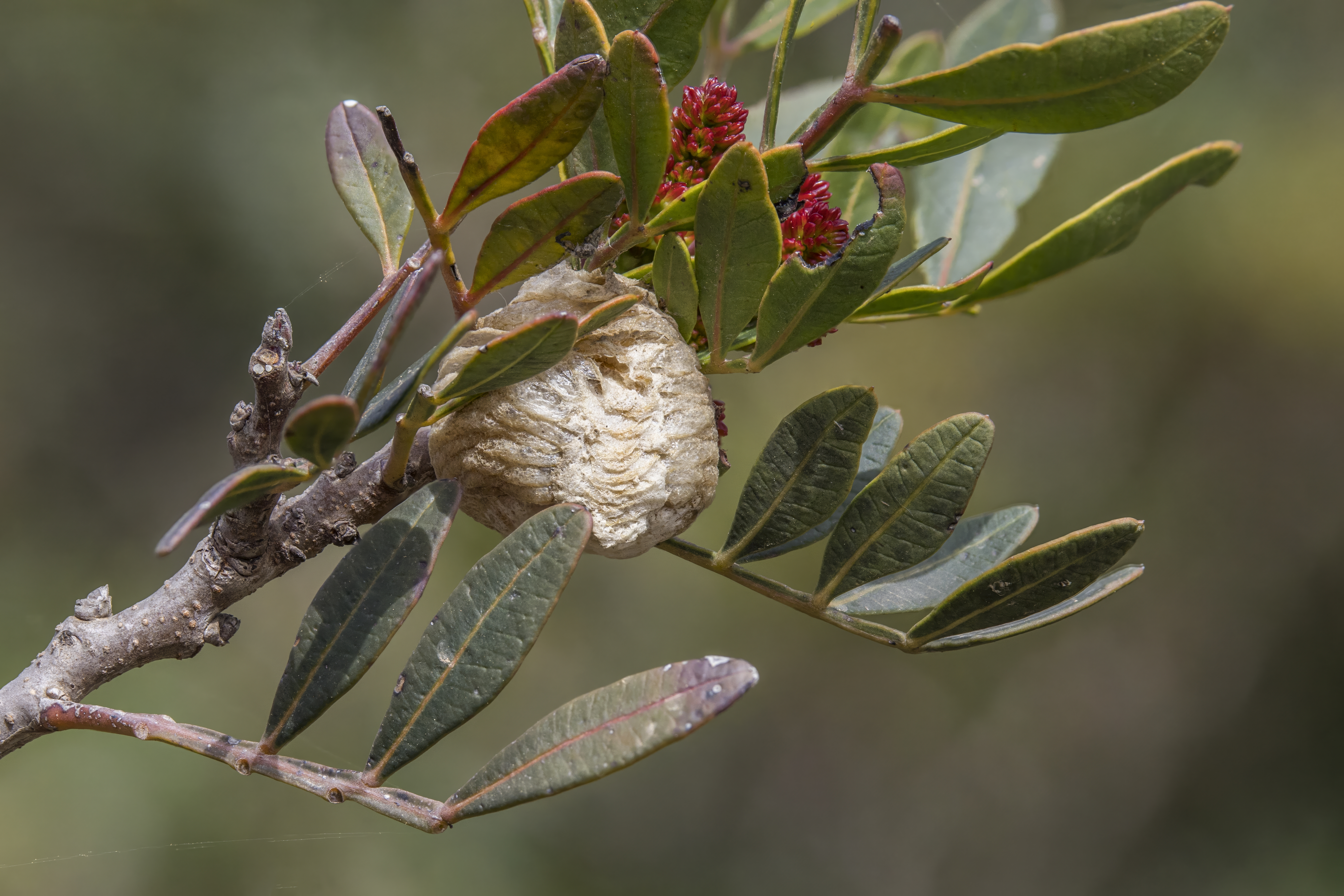
Praying mantis (Mantis religiosa)

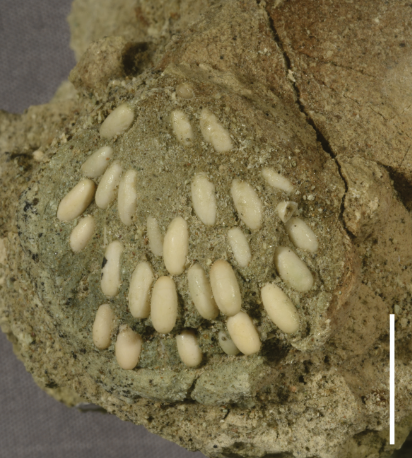
Fossil ootheca Subterroothecichnus radialis, produced by a grasshopper

== See also ==
- Sang piao xiao, mantis oothecae used in traditional Chinese medicine
