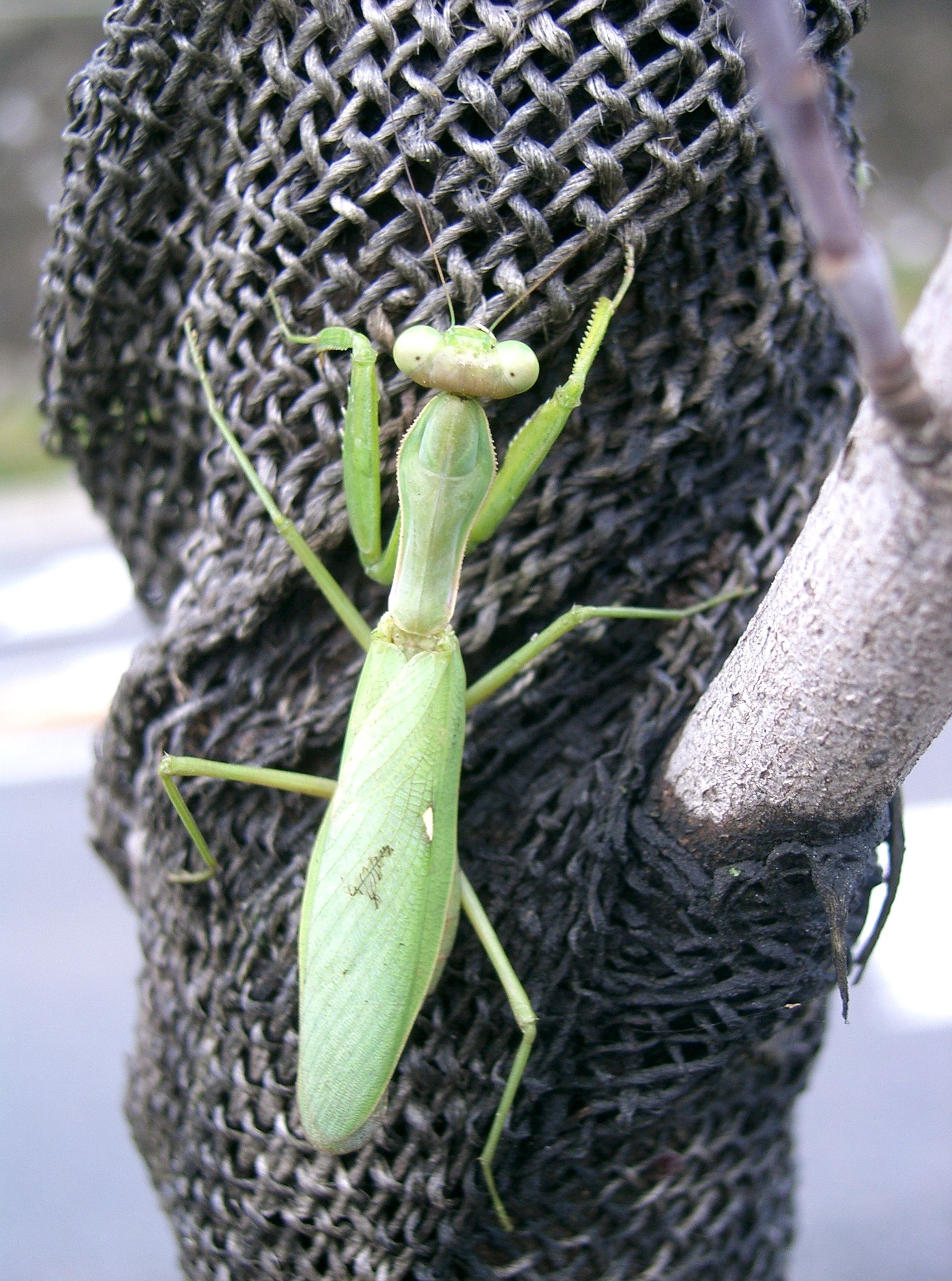

Scientific classification
- Kingdom: Animalia
- Phylum: Arthropoda
- Clade: Pancrustacea
- Class: Insecta
- Order: Mantodea
- Family: Mantidae
- Genus: Hierodula
- Species: H. patellifera

Binomial name
- Hierodula patellifera Serville, 1839

Synonyms
- Hierodula bipapilla Serville, 1839; Hierodula daqingshanensis Wang, 1993; Hierodula dispar Kirby, 1900; Hierodula manillana Giglio-Tos, 1912; Hierodula manillensis Saussure, 1870; Hierodula multispina Wang, 1993; Hierodula raptoria Stal, 1877; Hierodula xishaensis Wang, 1993; Hierodula yunnanensis Wang, 1993

= Hierodula patellifera =

Giant Asian mantis

Species of praying mantis

Hierodula patellifera, commonly known as giant Asian mantis, Asian mantis, or Indochina mantis, is a species of praying mantis in the family Mantidae. They are found in Malaysia, Hawaii, India, Nepal, Italy (San Paolo Solbrito), Indonesia (Java, West Sumba,), Korean Peninsula, Philippines, New Guinea, southern China, Taiwan, Vietnam, and Japan (Honshu, Shikoku, Kyushu, Okinawa). H. patellifera lives in trees and in grasslands at the edges of forests.

== Description ==
H. patellifera is a species that is part of the subfamily Hierodulinae. A distinct appearance makes this species recognizable owing to its elongated prothorax and slender body, which contributes to an overall stick-like structure. This species can be seen around the southeast Asia region, inhabiting grasslands and forest where it can effectively camouflage. Males are about 5.19 cm long while females range from 6.06 cm long, with individual variation into two different colours, green or brown. Significant morphological diversity has been observed within this species across populations. Research has observed variation of body size, shape of spines in the forelegs and genitalia size in specimens from Korea, Okinawa, Java and Guam. This degree of variation could suggest a high intraspecific variability with genetic cohesion, supporting classification of H. patellifera as a single unit, possibly a species complex.

== Reproductive behavior ==
In the unique world of insect communication, H. patellifera portray a unique type of behavior that benefits sexual reproduction in their species. According to a study by Perez (2005), virgin female mantis have a unique adaptation that help them attract mates. This type of behaviour is portraying body posture, signalling mates that they are available for mating. This type of behaviour is combined with the arching of the abdomen to expose its dorsal surface and a pumping movement that releases chemical signals such as pheromones which primarily attract males. Perez observed that this posture is linked with the female mantis's nutritional state and reproductive readiness. Males that are attracted to the released pheromones can distinguish between virgin and mated mantises, as only virgin mantises practice this kind of behaviour. Additionally, intricate predatory movement can also have effects in mate selection. Displaying the ability to stalk and ability to successfully capture prey can be used a signal to display over male fitness.

== Climate change bioindicator ==
H. patellifera is a type of thermophilic mantis native in the South-East Asia region. A company in Korea has used this species as a biological indicator species, due to the mantis' sensitivity toward climatic changes. Studies have shown that this species of mantises have developed phenological and geographical changes. H. patellifera has been observed to start foraging earlier and expanding their geographical habitat into cooler regions. This adjustment has resulted in shortened dormancy and delayed senescence. This study started from 1988 to 2022 from the help of citizen scientists, highlighting the role of the public understanding of biodiversity changes. The behaviour observed have helped researchers understand survival strategies that H. patellifera; moreover understand if similar thermophilic species has the same ability to detect and to see how climate change impacts the overall species. The responsive predatory behaviour observed in mantises such as the stalking behaviour is based on temperature, showing direct relationship with to changing climate conditions

== Crypsis ==
In the world of prey-predator relationship, the praying mantis, H. patellifera, exhibits unique behavioral adaptations due to environmental pressures. The behaviors that the mantises exhibit include how they modify their behavior to lower risk of predation in different wind conditions. The observed behavior is that increased wind velocity resulted in body-swaying and cryptic walking behaviors, increasing their chance of being camouflaged within their environment. Furthermore, the color polymorphism observed in H. patellifera, from vivid green to muted brown provides a significant advantage for mantises to blend seamlessly with their environment.

== Predatory behavior ==
One of the unique adaptation of H. patellifera is its ability to stalk and approach its prey, showcasing advanced predatory behaviors. In a field experiment, mantid was observed exhibiting "peering" movements, swaying back and forth while advancing toward its prey (moth). This is similar to their movement whilst camouflaged within their surrounding to mimic nearby leaves in windy conditions. The peering movement not only helps blend with the surroundings but also in gauging distance, increasing the perception of the insect. Despite the mantis probing the moth with its raptorial forelegs, the mantis refrained from attacking due to many reasons, such as moth's size being too big or having lack of feeding motivation.

In a field study conducted in the Quetta and Pishin districts in Pakistan, over 380 specimens on H. patellifera were collected; this marks the first record of this species in the Pakistani region. H. patellifera has been observed feeding mainly on homopterans.

A study by Sugiura (2021) highlights the interaction of H. patellifera and bombardier beetles. The interaction between the two species showed how bombardier beetle defend themselves against predators such as the mantis. When the mantis attacked the beetle, the beetle released hot chemicals, causing the mantis to loosen its grip allowing the beetle to escape. The mantis was observed cleaning itself, which could suggest that the chemical irritates the mantis significantly.

== Circadian rhythms ==
H. patellifera has been observed to exhibit circadian rhythms that regulate visual physiology, behavior, and locomotion. Studies used eletroretinograms (ERGs) to see the reaction of photoreceptors, finding that during night time the sensitivity of the photoreceptors increases while it decreases during day time. Pigment within the compound system aligns with light-dark cycles, it has been observed that it darkened during night and lightens in the morning. the behaviour of the H. patellifera is closely related to environmental light cycles. More activity has been observed more during day time compared to night time.

== Range expansion ==
The introduction of H. patellifera to countries far away from the peninsula are mostly due to human-linked activities such as cargo transport from Asian countries or its popularity on the exotic trade market. This particular species is native to the South East Asia region, but due to the growing global trade the species has also been found in the Mediterranean countries. Due to the species' ability to adapt accordingly to its new environment, it has enabled itself to establish itself in south region of France. The increasing global trade and the expansion of the exotic trade market has allowed H. patellifera beyond its native ecosystem spreading concerns over the possibility of competing with the native species and destabilizing the overall ecological system.

== Additional images ==
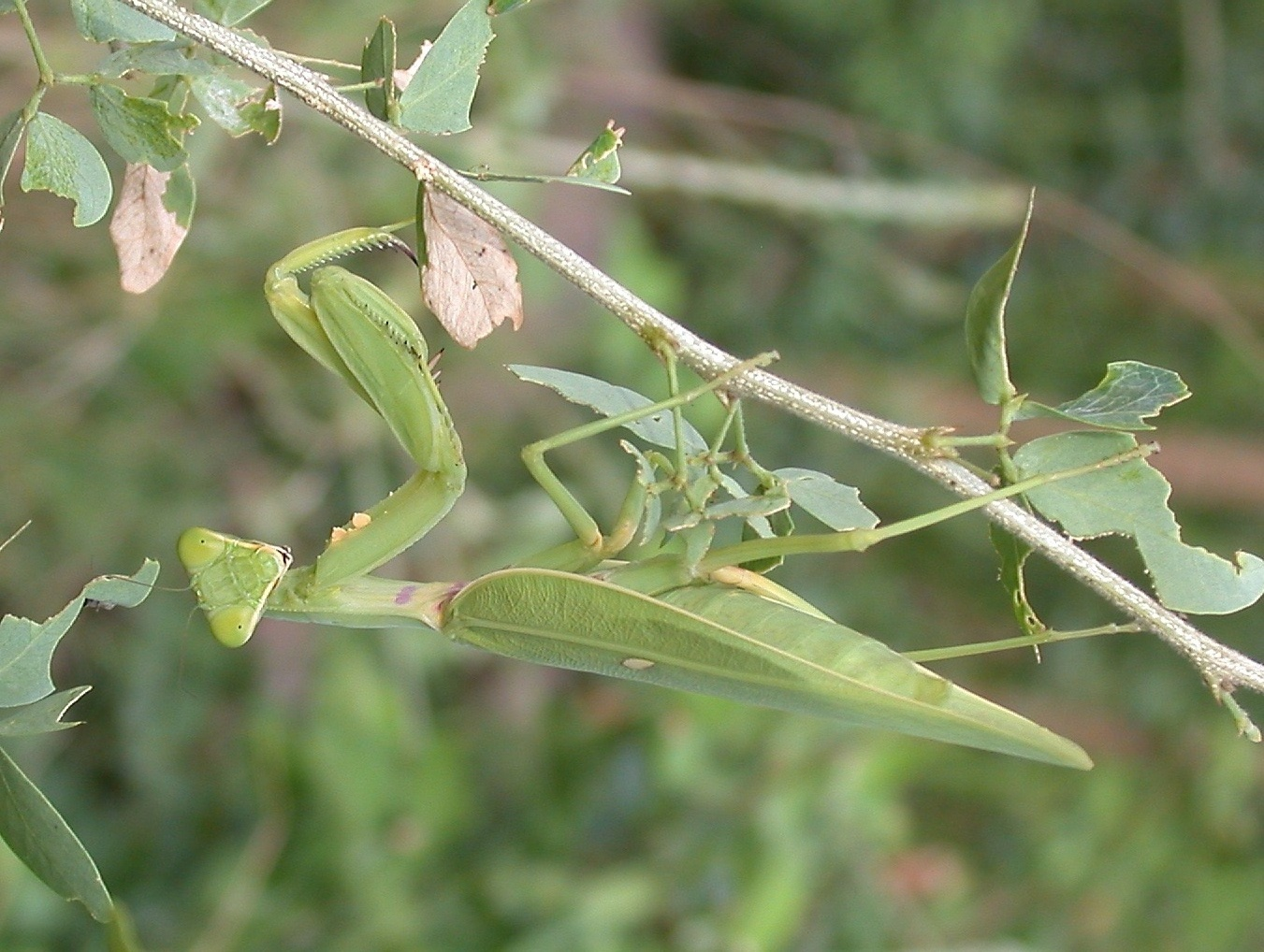
Adult female

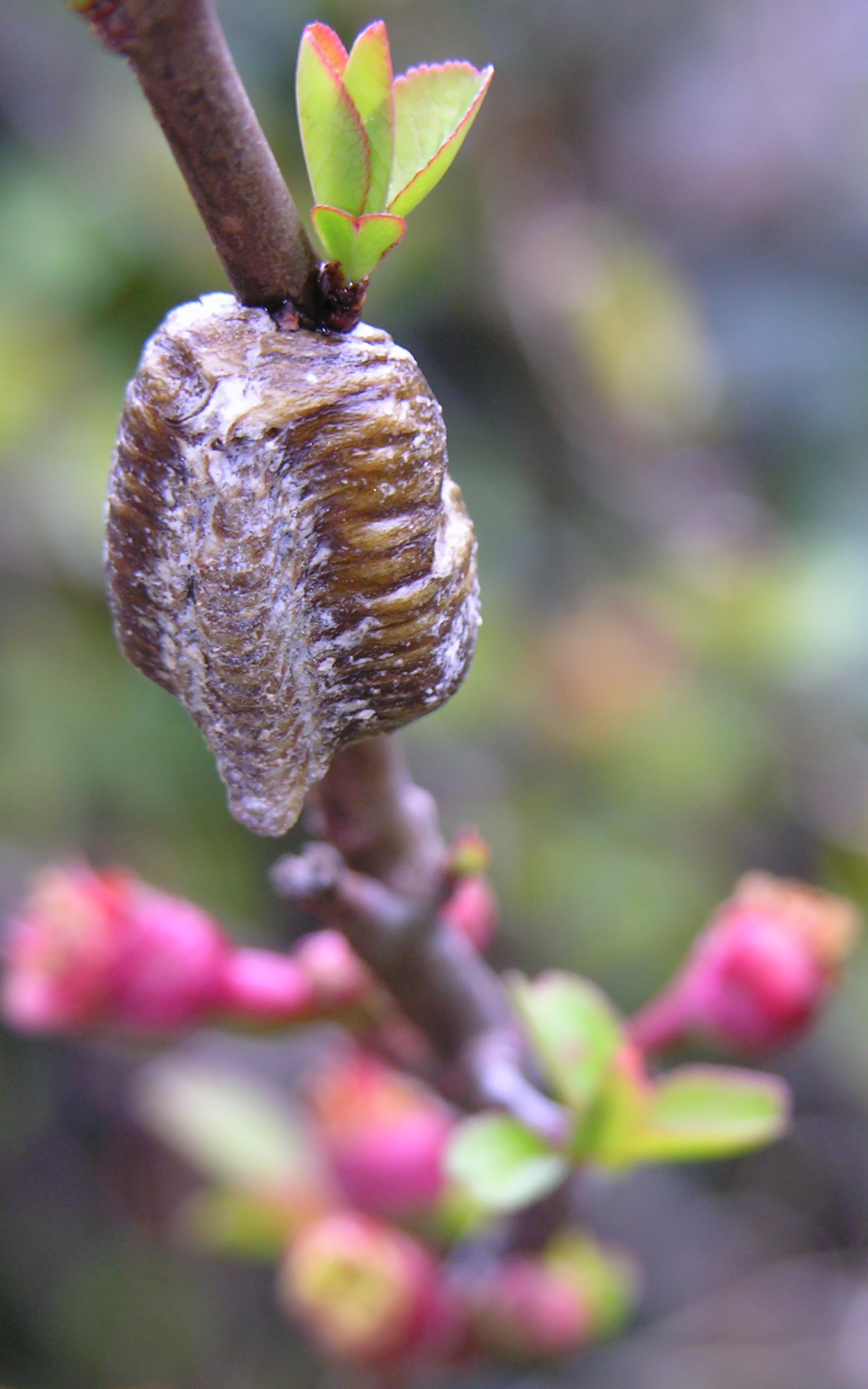
Ootheca of Hierodula patellifera

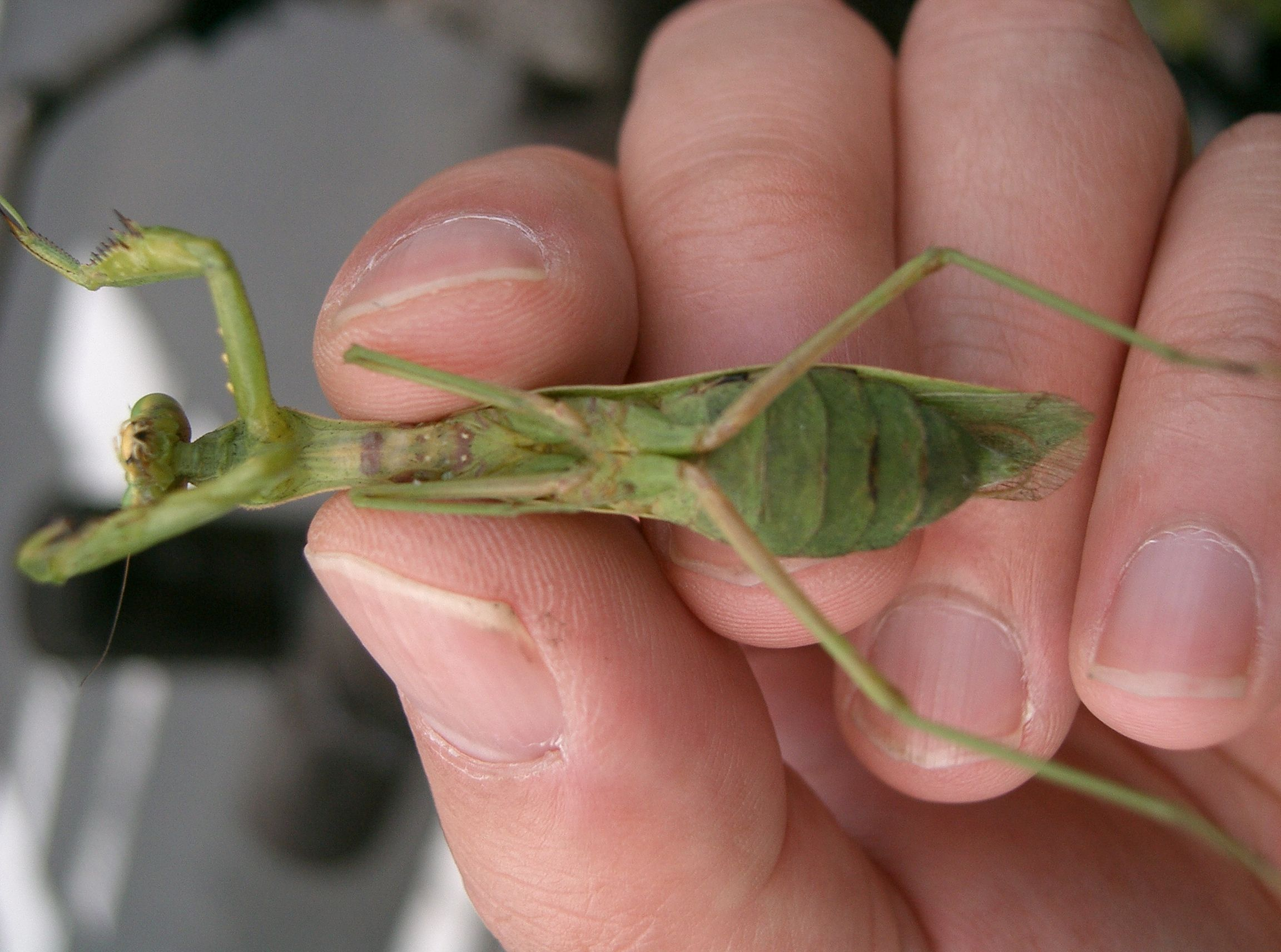
Underside of adult female Hierodula patellifera Osaka-ful, Japan

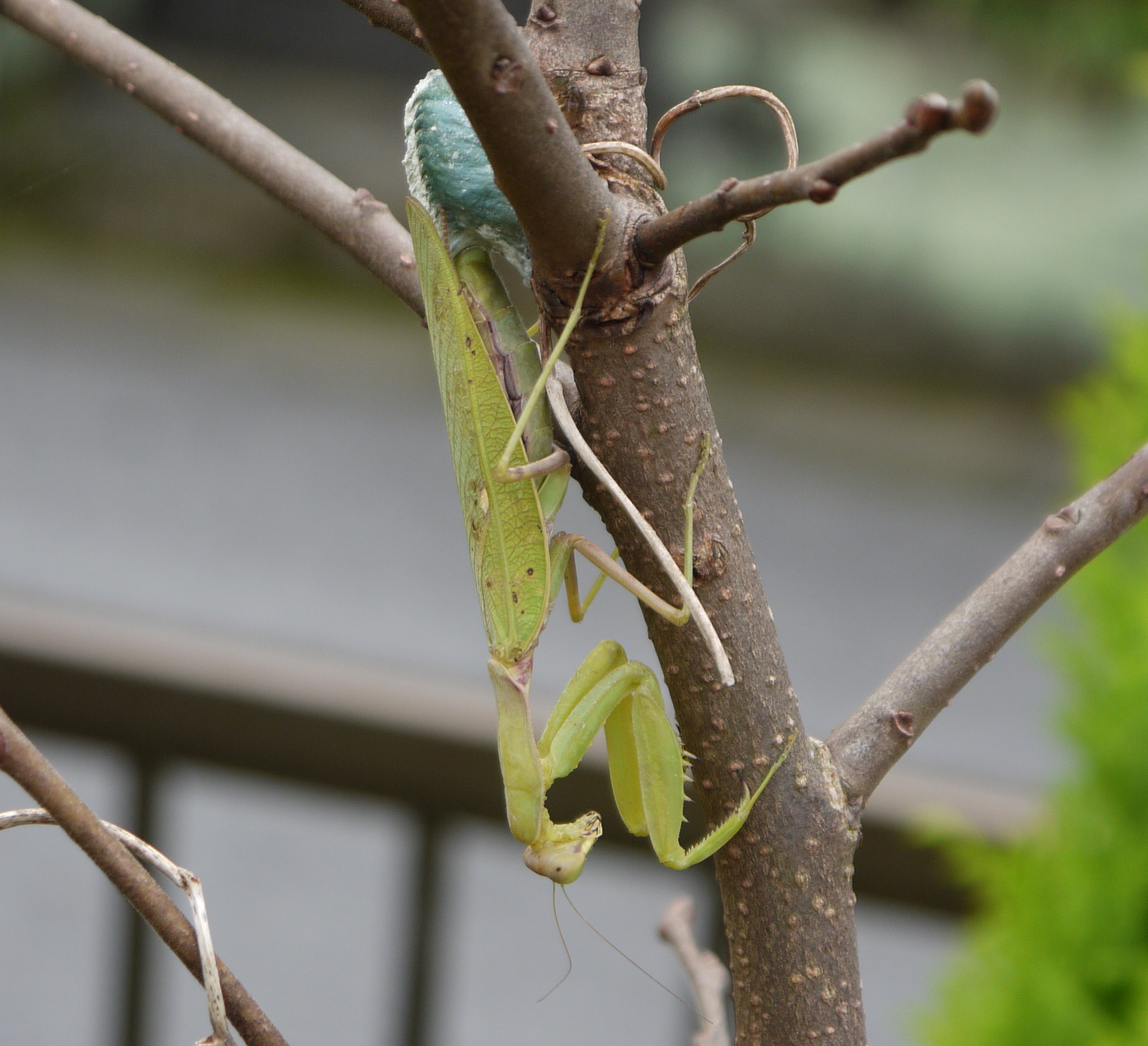
Hierodula patellifera laying ootheca

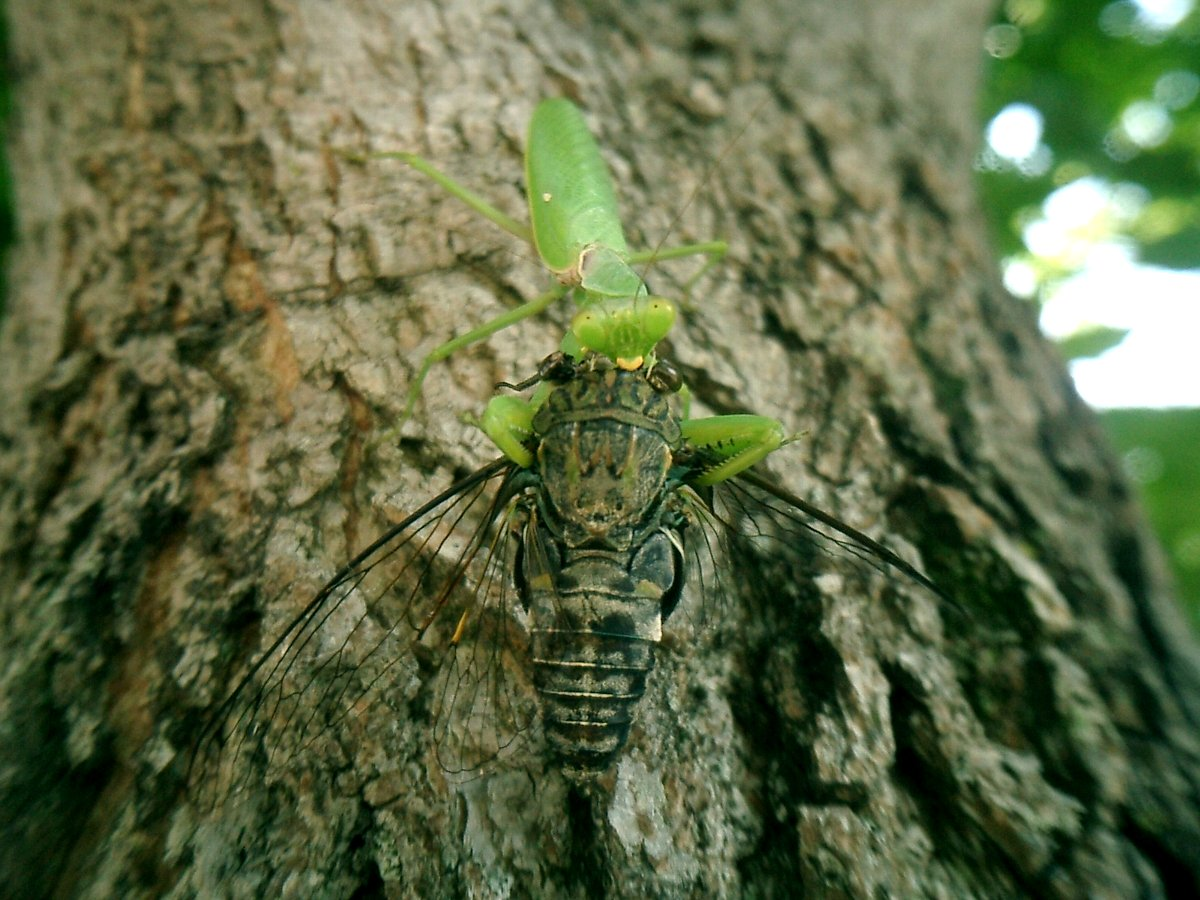
Hierodula patellifera preying on cicada

Hierodula patellifera filmed in Tokyo, Japan

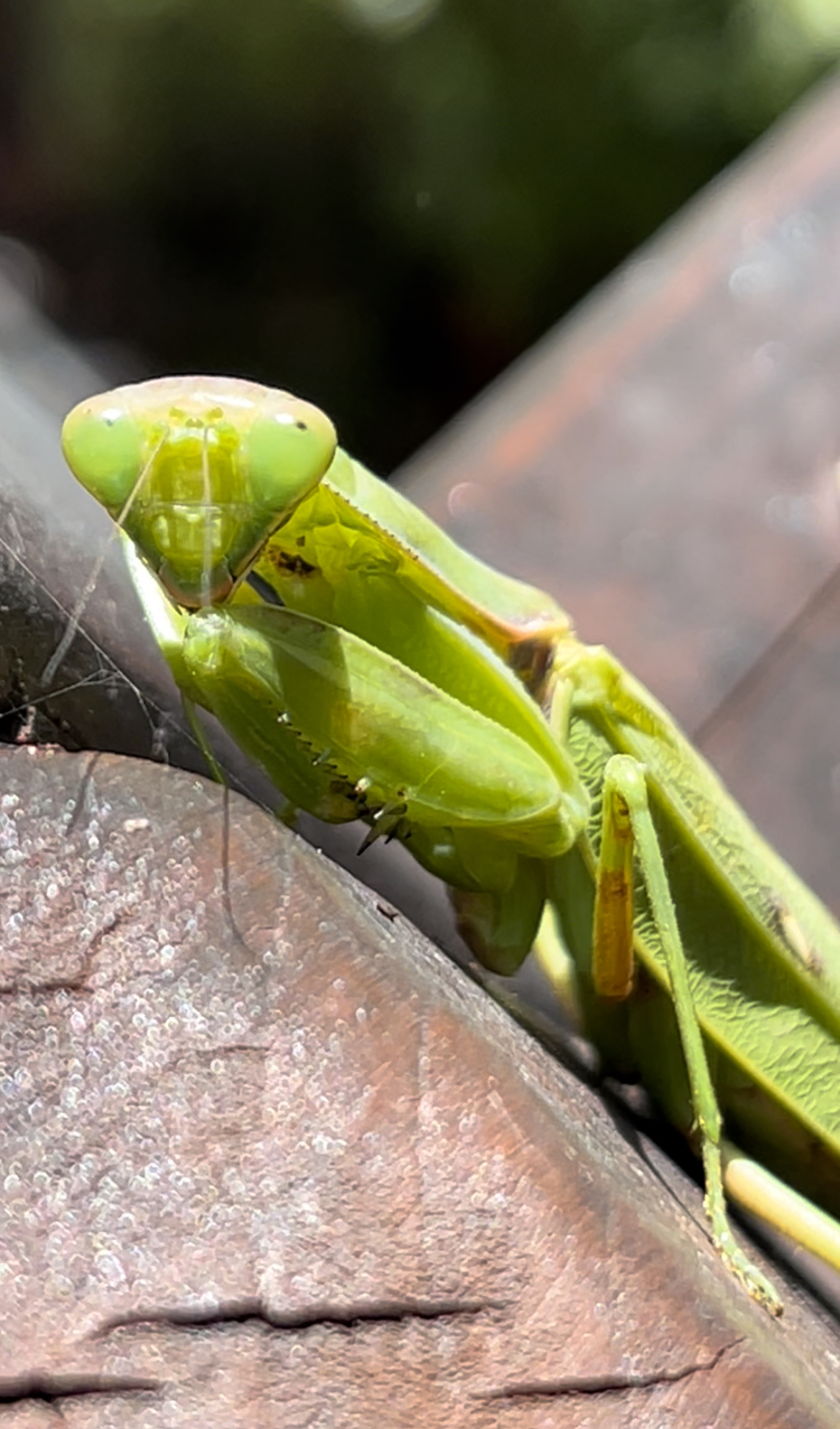
Hierodula patellifera found in Seoul, South Korea.

== See also ==
- List of mantis species and genera
