= Tanning activator =

Chemical

Tanning activators are chemicals that increase the effect of UV-radiation on the human skin.

== Overview ==
Since sunburn and suntan are induced by the same mechanism (direct DNA damage), these substances increase the likelihood for sunburn as well. The best known tanning activator is psoralen which is an ingredient of bergamot oil. Psoralen has been present in sunscreens in order to allow suntanning despite the reduced UV-intensity that acts on the deeper layers of the skin. In Switzerland, a ban was imposed on psoralen containing sunscreens in 1987 but it was loosely enforced for several years. In other countries these substances have been present in sunscreens until the first epidemiological results have shown that users have a fourfold risk of developing melanoma. They were finally banned in 1996. This happened more than 15 years after the photocarcinogenic potential of psoralen had been demonstrated. After the evidence for the photocarcinogenic potential of psoralen emerged, sunscreens which combined UVB filters and psoralen were introduced onto the market. These products were accompanied by campaigns to convince the public and the regulatory authorities that these products were safe or even better than usual sunscreens. These sunscreens were especially recommended to poor tanners. Psoralen tanning lotions were available in France, Belgium and Greece.

== Mechanism of tanning activators ==
The increased production of melanin is the reaction of the skin to UVB-induced direct DNA damage. Several substances are known to increase the amount of direct DNA damage (thymine dimers). In order to produce this action they have to penetrate into the skin, and this is in contrast to the assumptions which are made by those who endorse sunscreen use (see sunscreen controversy).

The tanning activator coumarin is known to induce thymine dimers (cyclobutane pyrimidine dimers).

Other Web sites state correctly that: "Coumarins produce photosensitivity therefore advise the patient to avoid direct sunlight after treatment.

== See also ==
- Sunscreen
- Indoor tanning lotion
- Sunless tanning
