= Melanocytic tumors of uncertain malignant potential =

Melanocytic tumors of uncertain malignant potential (MELTUMP) are melanocytic lesions in the skin that cannot be classified by morphology as either benign naevi (moles) or malignant melanomas because the mass shows features of both.

Several lesion types may be classified as MELTUMPs: these include atypical melanocytic proliferations with features that may overlap with atypical Spitz naevi/tumors, dysplastic naevi, pigmented epithelioid melanocytoma, deep penetrating naevi, congenital naevi, cellular nodules in congenital naevi, possible naevoid melanomas, and cellular blue naevi.

A related category of melanocytic proliferation is superficial atypical melanocytic proliferations of uncertain significance (SAMPUS). This category, unlike MELTUMP, which implies as yet undetermined potential for metastases even after complete excision, signifies lesions without metastatic potential at time of excision but with potential to progress upon incomplete excision. The SAMPUS category includes certain atypical junctional melanocytic proliferations and proliferations in both the epidermis and papillary dermis that are not accompanied by intradermal tumorigenic architecture or cell mitosis.

== See also ==
- List of cutaneous conditions
