= Bahamas sawshark =

Conservation status
- Least Concern (IUCN 3.1)

Scientific classification
- Kingdom: Animalia
- Phylum: Chordata
- Class: Chondrichthyes
- Subclass: Elasmobranchii
- Division: Selachii
- Order: Pristiophoriformes
- Family: Pristiophoridae
- Genus: Pristiophorus
- Species: P. schroederi

Binomial name
- Pristiophorus schroederi S. Springer & Bullis, 1960
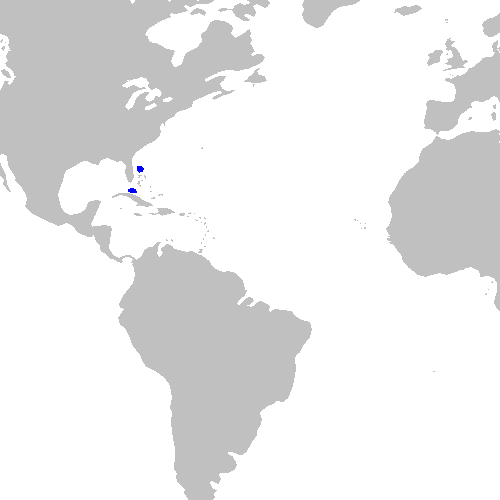
- Range of Bahamas sawshark (in blue)

Species of shark

The Bahamas sawshark, Pristiophorus schroederi, is a sawshark of the family Pristiophoridae, found in the western Central Atlantic Ocean from the Bahamas and Cuba at depths of between 400 and 1,000 m. These sharks are at least 80 cm long.

The Bahamas sawshark is found on continental and insular slopes. Its reproduction is ovoviviparous.

Pristiophorus schroederi is the first member of the sawsharks (family Pristiophoridae) described from the western hemisphere. Like its family members, it is most likely a descendant of the Cenozoic sawshark, Pristiophorus lanceolatus from New Zealand and Australia. It is a poorly known family and only consists of six members: P. cirratus, P. delicatus, P. japinicus, P. nancyae, P. nudipinnis, and P. schroederi. Three specimens of Pristiophoridae schroederi were discovered; 38.3, 64.5, and 80.5 centimeters in length, were collected by an incidental product of exploratory fishing operations by the U.S. Bureau of Commercial Fisheries. One was discovered in the Santaren Channel and two from the Atlantic, just north of Little Bahama Bank.

== Behavior ==
Despite the menacing appearance of this sawshark, it tends to feed primarily on fish and crustaceans like other species of its kind. They feed primarily on the seafloor. Although most shark species tend to spend most of their time solitary, sawsharks are known to form schools.

== Ecology ==
Many members of the family Pristiophoridae are endangered, including the P. schroederi. The sawsharks in general are among the most threatened sharks on the planet.

== Phylogeny ==
Springer and Bullis (1960) began to explore the possibility of only one extant Pristiophorus species worldwide, but failed to legitimize that statement due to several distinct species in our seas, one of those species being P. schroederi. The farthest lineage known goes back to early Cretaceous period, but this species (P. tumidens) is considered an offshoot of the main Pristiophorid lineage.

== Anatomy ==
Sharks in the sawshark family (Pristiophoridae) are similar to the sawfish (family Pristidae) in their saw-like snout, but are smaller and have the basic structural plan of sharks rather than rays. Distinguishing features include a slight compression of their body and strong flattening of their head, and they tend to reach maturity at around one meter.

=== Head ===
Pristiophorus schroederi has a flattened head, which is typical of this family. It has five gill slits, almost all equal in length. The fifth gill slit crosses the insertion of the pectoral fin and extends about equal distance above and below it. It has a thin saw-like snout, less than one third of the total length of body. The snout has a row of unserrated spines along the sides and two rows of shorter thornlike spines on the underside near the sides all the way from the tip to the nasal openings. Nostrils are oval and surrounded by a narrow raised rim. The spines are very slightly curved and alternate long (5 to 7 mm) and short (2 to 3 mm), 47 or 48 spines on either side of the snout. There is a pair of barbels located on either side of the snout. The mouth itself is slightly arched.

The upper jaw teeth are in 36 rows and the bottom jaw teeth are shaped similarly but in 32 rows. P. nudipinnis is within the same range as P. schroederi. The eyes are large in comparison to overall size, about two times the size horizontally compared to vertically. It is hard to establish any outrageous differences between the P. schroederi and other species of sawsharks, although the P. schroederi do tend to have a proportionately longer snout than other species. Notably longer than the snout of P. owenii and P. nudipinnis but only a little bit longer than that of P. cirratus. As for teeth (P. schroederi with 33 to 36 rows) is different from P. cirratus and P. japonicas with 39 to 56 rows. P. nudipinnis is within the same range as P. schroederi.

=== Body ===
It has no anal fin, but two dorsal fins approximately equal in size. The first dorsal fin originates about halfway from the tip of the snout to the tip of the caudal fin, the origin of the second dorsal fin is posterior to the tips of the pelvic fins. It has large pectoral fins, that's inner margins curve inward toward the base of the fins. There are dermal denticles on the dorsal surface of the body with very little overlapping. Fins are fully scaled but the snout is only partially covered. The ventral scales are usually leaf like with no accessory points or ridges. P. nudipinnis shows the largest difference in denticle structures. P. schroederi has typical denticles of the dorsal surface that are usually slender and leaf like, they bear a very long slender point directed up and back with two accessory points on either side. The dorsal dermal denticles of P. nudipinnis are thickened and broader rather than longer. They are about diamond-shaped, and paved. The 3-point denticles distinguish P. schroederi very apparently from all other species of Pristiophorus.
