= Undescribed taxon =

Taxon that has been discovered but not yet formally described and named

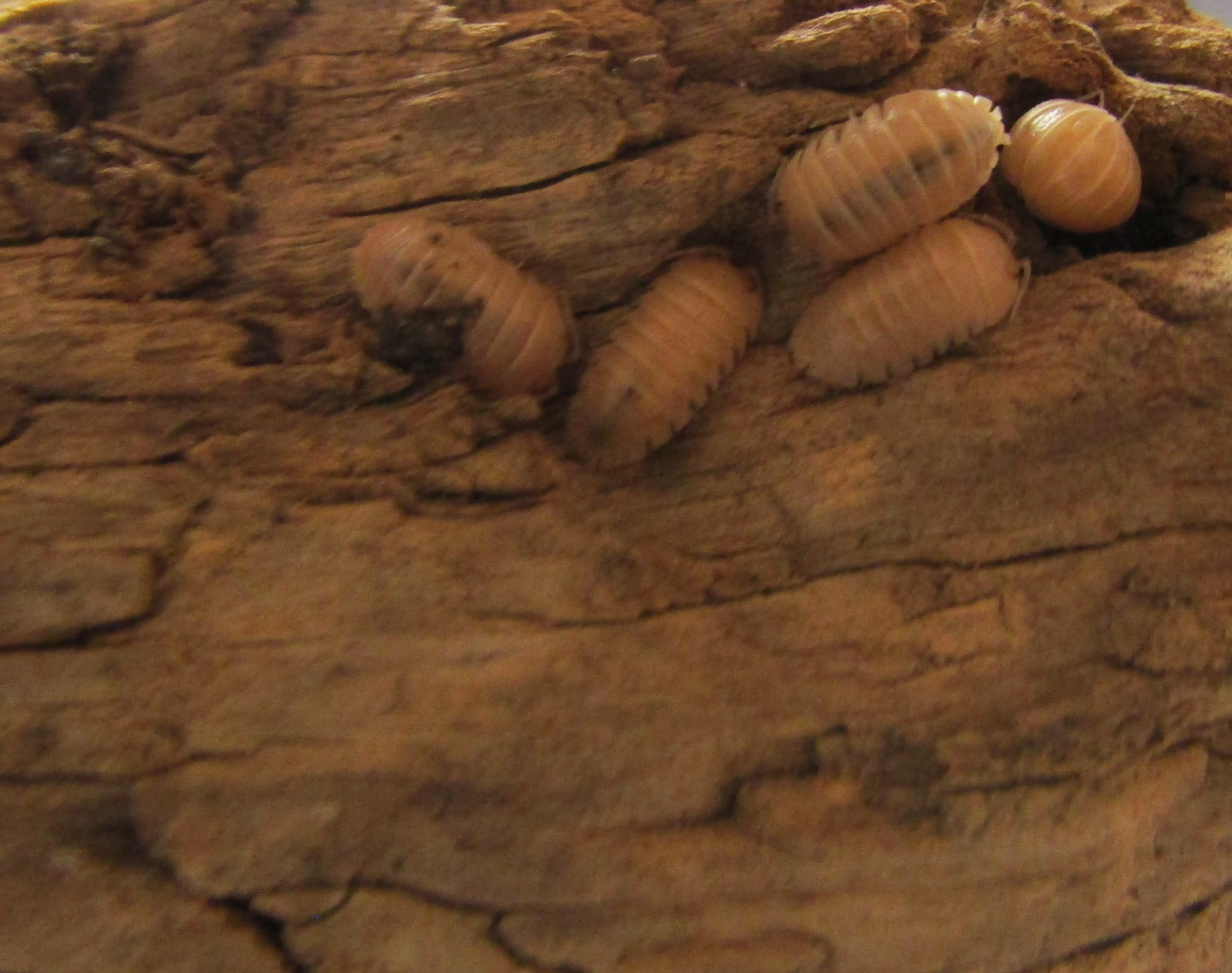
A conglomeration of Armadillidium sp. ''Lefkada'', currently an undescribed species in the isopod trade market.

In taxonomy, an undescribed taxon is a taxon (for example, a species) that has been discovered, but not yet formally described and named. The various nomenclature codes specify the requirements for a new taxon to be validly described and named. Until such a description has been published, the taxon has no formal or official name, although a temporary, informal name is often used. A published scientific name may not fulfil the requirements of the Codes for various reasons. For example, if the taxon was not adequately described, its name is called a nomen nudum. It is possible for a taxon to be "undescribed" for an extensive period of time, even if unofficial descriptions are published.

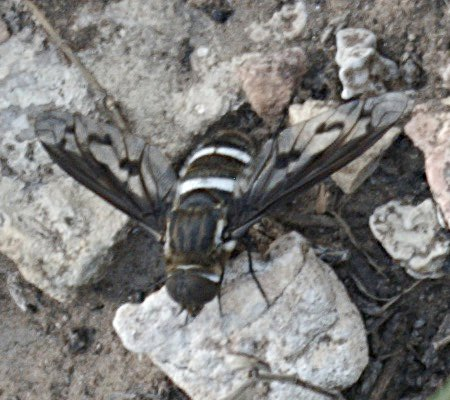
According to the entomologist Andy Calderwood, this fly of the genus Exoprosopa belongs to an undescribed species (as of September, 2009).

An undescribed species may be referred to with the genus name, followed by "sp.", but this abbreviation is also used to label specimens or images that are too incomplete to be identified at the species level. In some cases, there is more than one undescribed species in a genus. In this case, these are often referred to by a number or letter. In the shark genus Pristiophorus, for example, there were, for some time, four undescribed species, informally named Pristiophorus sp. A, B, C and D. (In 2008, sp. A was described as Pristiophorus peroniensis and sp. B as P. delicatus.) When a formal description for species C or D is published, its temporary name will be replaced with a proper binomial name.

== Modern context and challenges ==
The discovery of undescribed taxa has accelerated dramatically with advances in molecular biology and the growing use of image-based identifications. DNA barcoding and similar molecular techniques have revealed many cryptic species – organisms that appear morphologically identical but are genetically distinct enough to represent different species. This has led to a significant increase in the recognition of undescribed taxa within what were previously thought to be single species.

The scale of undescribed biodiversity is substantial. In marine environments alone, while there are over 246,000 formally described species, scientists estimate the total number of species ranges from several hundred thousand to multiple millions. The gap between discovery and formal description continues to widen, with estimates suggesting it takes between 13 and 21 years on average from initial discovery of a new species to its formal taxonomic description. This delay between discovery and formal description, often called the "taxonomic impediment", is exacerbated by a shortage of taxonomic experts and the time-intensive nature of preparing formal species descriptions. As a result, many clearly distinct species remain in an undescribed state for extended periods, known only by temporary names or identifiers.

== Molecular approaches ==
Modern molecular methods have introduced new ways of recognizing potential undescribed species through DNA analysis. Molecular Operational Taxonomic Units (MOTUs) are groups of organisms distinguished by DNA sequence similarity, often revealing diversity that exceeds known described species. For example, in some large-scale environmental DNA studies, the number of MOTUs can surpass described species by an order of magnitude.

DNA barcoding, which uses standardized genetic markers to identify species, has become particularly important in recognizing undescribed taxa. When DNA sequences from specimens do not match any known species in reference databases, they may represent undescribed species. These are sometimes called "dark taxa" in molecular databases, as they lack formal taxonomic names. However, while molecular methods are powerful tools for discovering potential new species, they do not replace traditional taxonomic description. MOTUs and similar molecular groupings serve as important indicators of undescribed diversity, but formal species description typically requires additional evidence, including morphological analysis and ecological data.

== Provisional names in bacteriology ==
In bacteriology, a valid publication of a name requires the deposition of the bacteria in a Bacteriology Culture Collection. Species for which this is impossible cannot receive a valid binomial name; these species are classified as Candidatus.

== Provisional names in botany ==
A provisional name for a species may consist of the number or of some other designation of a specimen in a herbarium or other collection. It may also consist of the genus name followed by such a specimen identifier or by a provisional specific epithet which is enclosed by quotation marks. In the latter case, the author citation may be replaced by the Latin term ineditus or ined., meaning "unpublished". As of 2013, many species of the flowering plant genus Polyscias can be found in the scientific literature under such a designation. An enquoted name, however, is not necessarily unpublished. It may be an illegitimate name that has not yet been replaced by a correct name. For example, the name "Endressia" (sensu Whiffin) was published in 2007 for a genus in family Monimiaceae, but is an illegitimate homonym of Endressia J.Gay in family Apiaceae. In 2010, it was noted as illegitimate, but still used with quotation marks. This name was replaced with Pendressia in 2018.

== Database management ==
Major biodiversity databases have developed various approaches to handle undescribed taxa while maintaining taxonomic rigor. The World Register of Marine Species (WoRMS) allows for five broad name status categories: Accepted, Unaccepted, Uncertain, Alternative representation, and Temporary. Within WoRMS, temporary names can be used both for higher-rank placeholder taxa that accommodate species of uncertain classification, and for unnamed species that have been clearly identified as distinct through taxonomic studies.

The Global Biodiversity Information Facility (GBIF) and Ocean Biodiversity Information System (OBIS) incorporate undescribed taxa into their occurrence records using standardized fields in Darwin Core, a biodiversity data standard. These databases use specific fields like "taxonConceptID" and "identificationQualifier" to track specimens that represent potentially new species.

Management of undescribed taxa in databases presents unique challenges. For example, when a specimen is identified as representing a new species, it may initially receive a temporary collection-based identifier. This same specimen might then be referenced in molecular databases like GenBank or BOLD (Barcode of Life Data System) with a different identifier, and appear in published literature with yet another temporary name. Biodiversity databases must track these various identifiers and maintain links between them until the species receives formal taxonomic description.

To address these challenges, database managers increasingly recommend standardized formats for temporary names. These often incorporate institutional collection codes, specimen numbers, or other stable identifiers that can help track specimens and their associated data across different databases and publications. When species are formally described, their temporary identifiers can be retained in databases as alternative names, maintaining the connection between pre- and post-description records.

== See also ==
- Glossary of scientific naming
- Candidatus, an interim taxonomic status for yet-to-be-cultured organisms
- Nomenclature codes
- Number of species described each year in the 2000s
- Species discovery curve
- Unseen species problem
