= Ikamauius =

Ikamauius Temporal range: Eocene-Pleistocene

Scientific classification
- Kingdom: Animalia
- Phylum: Chordata
- Class: Chondrichthyes
- Subclass: Elasmobranchii
- Division: Selachii
- Order: Pristiophoriformes
- Family: Pristiophoridae
- Genus: †Ikamauius; Keyes, 1979
- Species: †I. ensifer

Binomial name
- †Ikamauius ensifer (Davis, 1888)

Synonyms
- Trygon ensifer Davis, 1888; Pristiophorus ensifer (Davis, 1888); Pristiophorus napierensis Chapman, 1918

Extinct genus of cartilaginous fishes

Ikamauius is an extinct genus of sawshark from the Cenozoic of New Zealand. It contains a single species, I. ensifer. It is most closely related to the extant Pliotrema, but is distinguished by the presence of barbs on both sides of its rostral denticles.
