= Kaja's sixgill sawshark =

Conservation status
- Data Deficient (IUCN 3.1)

Scientific classification
- Kingdom: Animalia
- Phylum: Chordata
- Class: Chondrichthyes
- Subclass: Elasmobranchii
- Division: Selachii
- Order: Pristiophoriformes
- Family: Pristiophoridae
- Genus: Pliotrema
- Species: P. kajae

Binomial name
- Pliotrema kajae Weigmann, Gon, Leeney & Temple, 2020
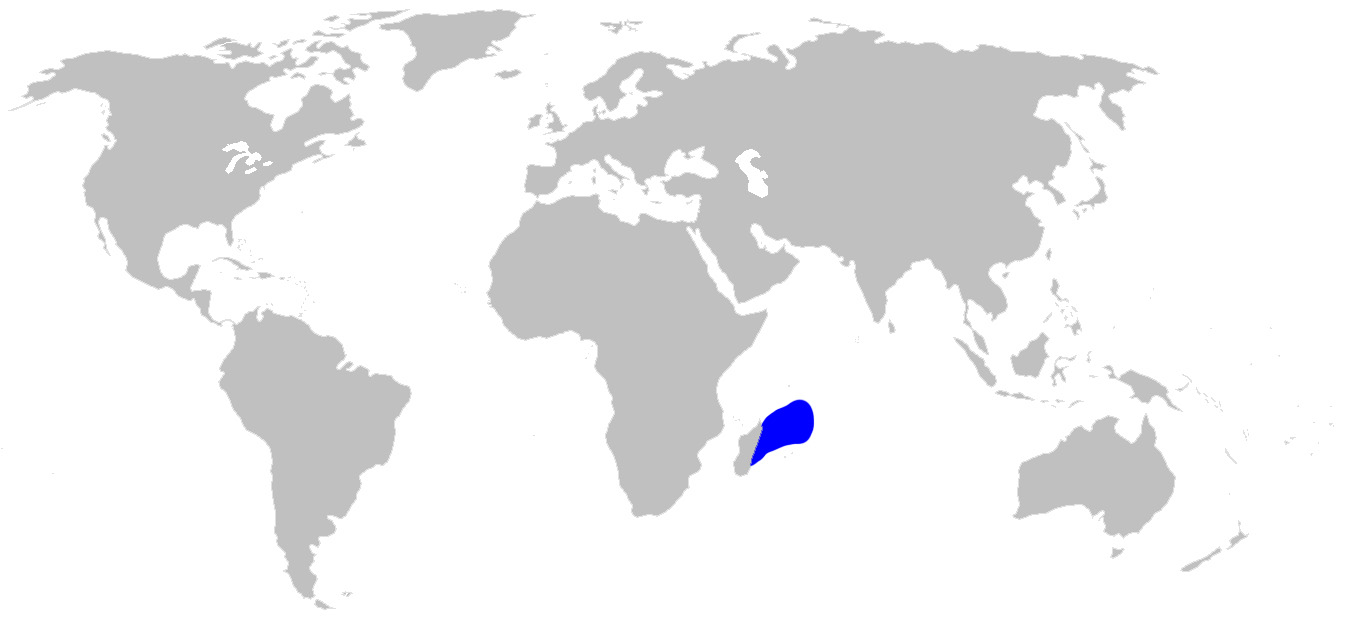
- Possible range of Kaja's sixgill sawshark

Species of shark

Kaja's sixgill sawshark (Pliotrema kajae) is a species of sawshark in the family Pristiophoridae found in Madagascar and the Mascarene Plateau. This sawshark lives in submarine ridges and upper insular slopes at depths of 214–320 m (702–1,050 ft).

Pliotrema kajae has its barbels situated roughly half way from the rostral tip to the mouth. It also has longer snout, more numerous rostral teeth, and lighter brown dorsal coloration if compared to Pliotrema annae (Anna's sixgill sawshark).
