= Eastern Australian sawshark =

Conservation status
- Near Threatened (IUCN 3.1)

Scientific classification
- Kingdom: Animalia
- Phylum: Chordata
- Class: Chondrichthyes
- Subclass: Elasmobranchii
- Division: Selachii
- Order: Pristiophoriformes
- Family: Pristiophoridae
- Genus: Pristiophorus
- Species: P. peroniensis

Binomial name
- Pristiophorus peroniensis Yearsley, Last & White, 2008
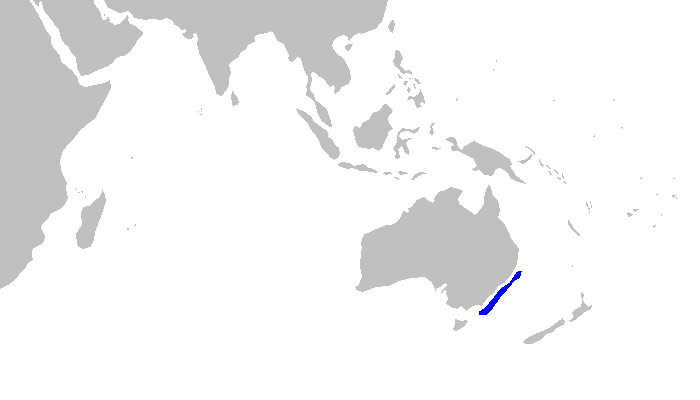
- Range of Eastern Australian sawshark

Species of shark

The Eastern Australian sawshark, Pristiophorus peroniensis, is a sawshark of the family Pristiophoridae, found off southeastern mainland Australia at depths of between 100 and 630 m. Its length is up to 1.36 m.

Prior to its description in 2008, this species was known as Pristiophorus sp. A. This species is now considered to be a synonym of Pristiophorus cirratus.
