= Pristiophorus striatus =

Pristiophorus striatus Temporal range: 20.43–15.97 Ma

Scientific classification
- Kingdom: Animalia
- Phylum: Chordata
- Class: Chondrichthyes
- Subclass: Elasmobranchii
- Division: Selachii
- Order: Pristiophoriformes
- Family: Pristiophoridae
- Genus: Pristiophorus
- Species: †P. striatus

Binomial name
- †Pristiophorus striatus Underwood & Schlogl, 2012

Extinct species of shark

Pristiophorus striatus is an extinct species of sawshark in the genus Pristiophorus. It existed in what is now Slovakia during the Miocene epoch, and was described by Charlie J. Underwood and Jan Schlogl in 2012.
