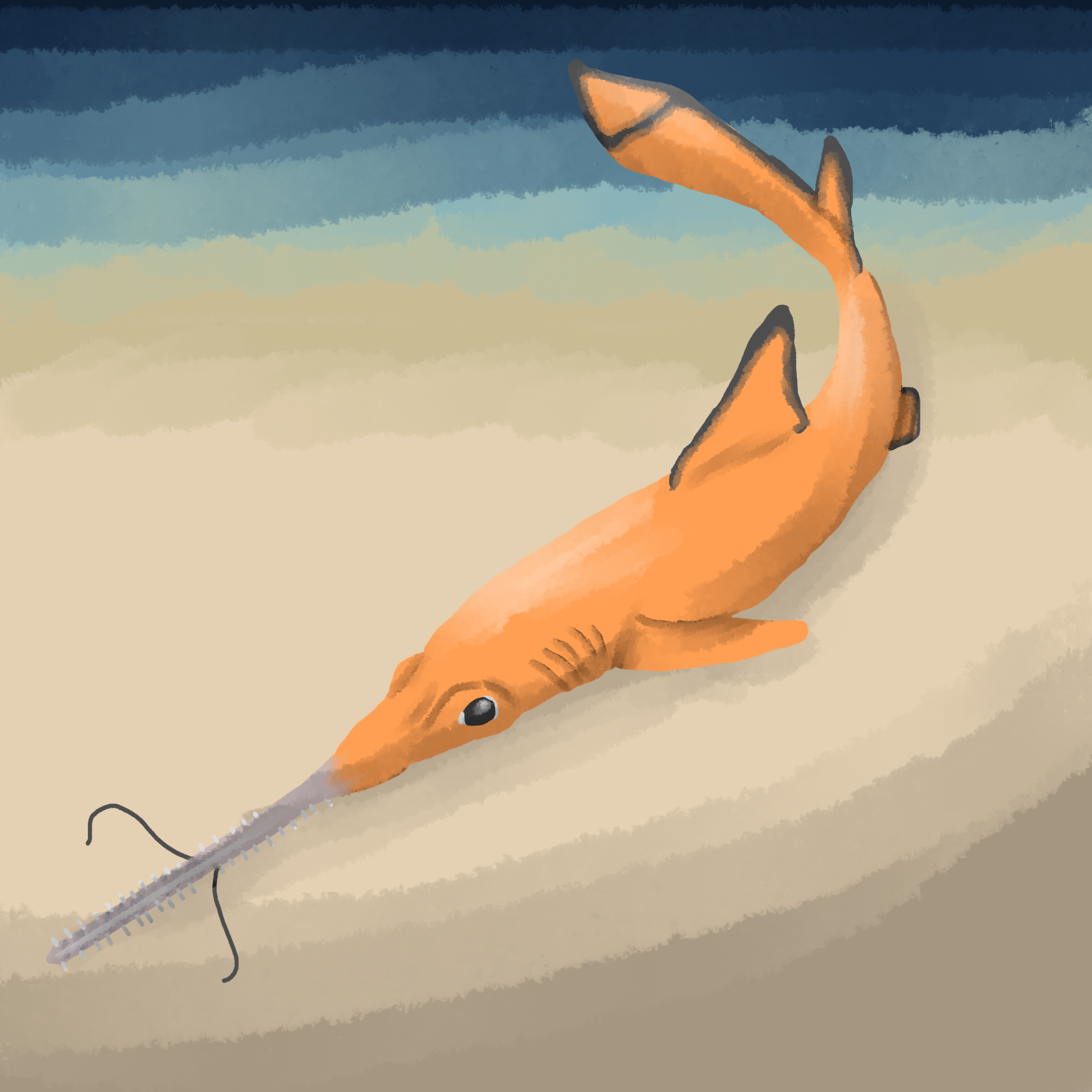

Scientific classification
- Kingdom: Animalia
- Phylum: Chordata
- Class: Chondrichthyes
- Subclass: Elasmobranchii
- Division: Selachii
- Order: Pristiophoriformes
- Family: Pristiophoridae
- Genus: †Pochitaserra; Villafaña et al, 2025
- Species: †P. patriciacanalae

Binomial name
- †Pochitaserra patriciacanalae Villafaña et al, 2025

= Pochitaserra =

Pochitaserra Temporal range: Late Miocene, 11–7 Ma

Extinct genus of shark

Pochitaserra (lit. Pochita saw) is an extinct genus of sawshark in the family Pristiophoridae. It was discovered in the Bahía Inglesa Formation in Chile, and is named after the character Pochita from the manga Chainsaw Man by Tatsuki Fujimoto. It is a monotypic taxon represented by the type species Pochitaserra patriciacanalae.

== Discovery and naming ==
Pochitaserra was discovered in the Bahía Inglesa Formation, a geological formation in Chile that contains deposits ranging from the Middle Miocene to the Early Pleistocene. The deposit containing Pochitaserra is thought to be Late Miocene-aged, and at least 7 million years old. The fossils of eight anterior teeth and one lateral tooth were discovered.

The genus name Pochitaserra is derived from the character Pochita from the manga Chainsaw Man by Tatsuki Fujimoto. The name was chosen because both sawsharks and the character have elongated, saw-like snouts. The specific name patriciacanalae is named after Chilean paleontologist Patricia Canales, who was a member of the team that described the species.

== See also ==
- List of organisms named after works of fiction
