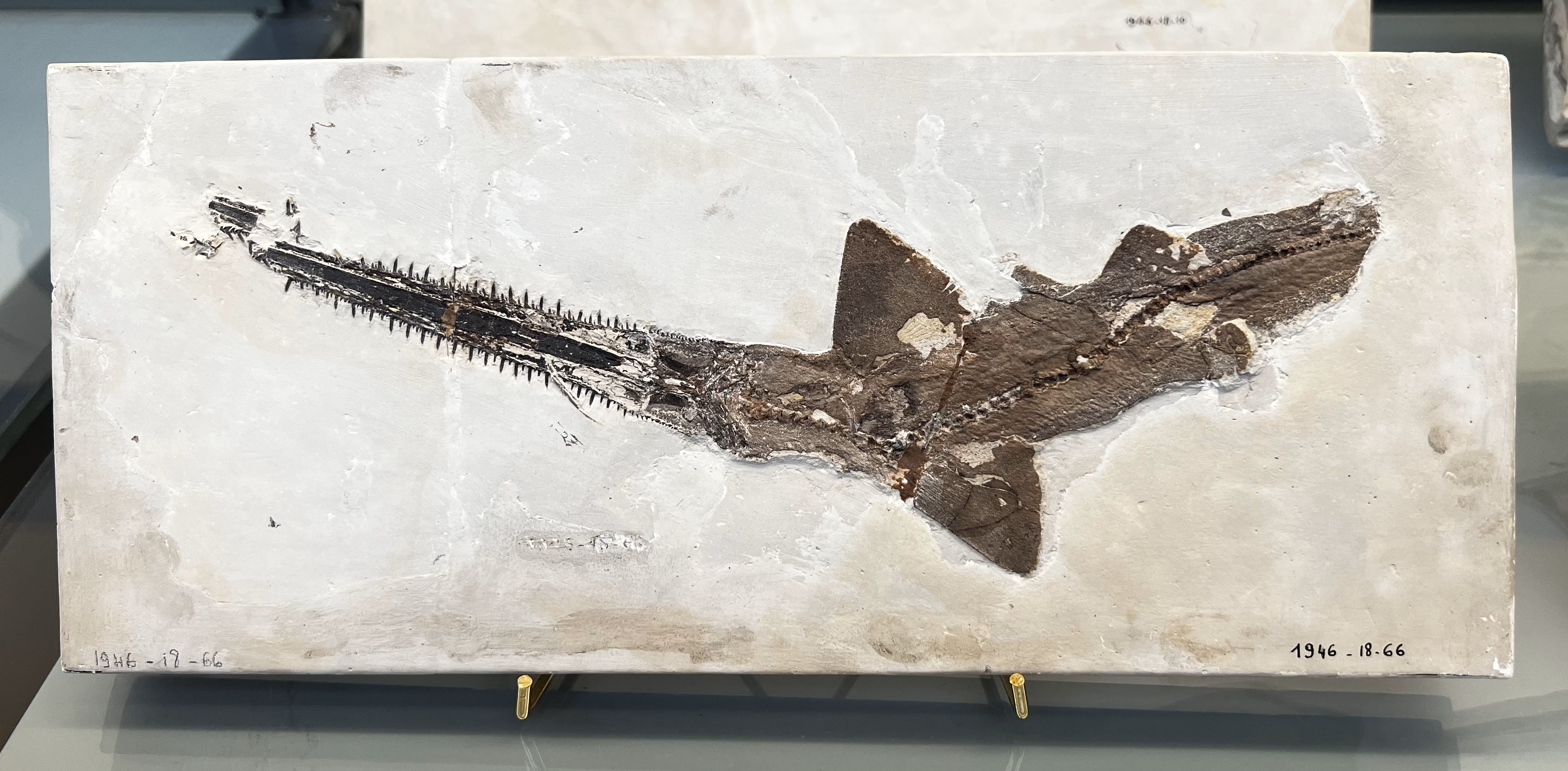
- Partial impression of P. tumidens (MNHN.F.SHA1593) at the National Museum of Natural History, France

Scientific classification
- Kingdom: Animalia
- Phylum: Chordata
- Class: Chondrichthyes
- Subclass: Elasmobranchii
- Division: Selachii
- Order: Pristiophoriformes
- Family: Pristiophoridae
- Genus: †Propristiophorus; Woodward, 1932
- Species: †P. tumidens

Binomial name
- †Propristiophorus tumidens Woodward, 1932

Synonyms
- Pristiophorus tumidens (Woodward, 1932)

= Propristiophorus =

Propristiophorus Temporal range: Santonian-Maastrichtian

Extinct genus of cartilaginous fishes

Propristiophorus is an extinct genus of sawshark that lived in the Late Cretaceous. It contains a single named species, P. tumidens, from Lebanon. Additional unnamed species have been found in Antarctica, Japan, and Madagascar. Propristiophorus was previously synonymized with Pristiophorus, but more recent authors have considered it a distinct genus.
