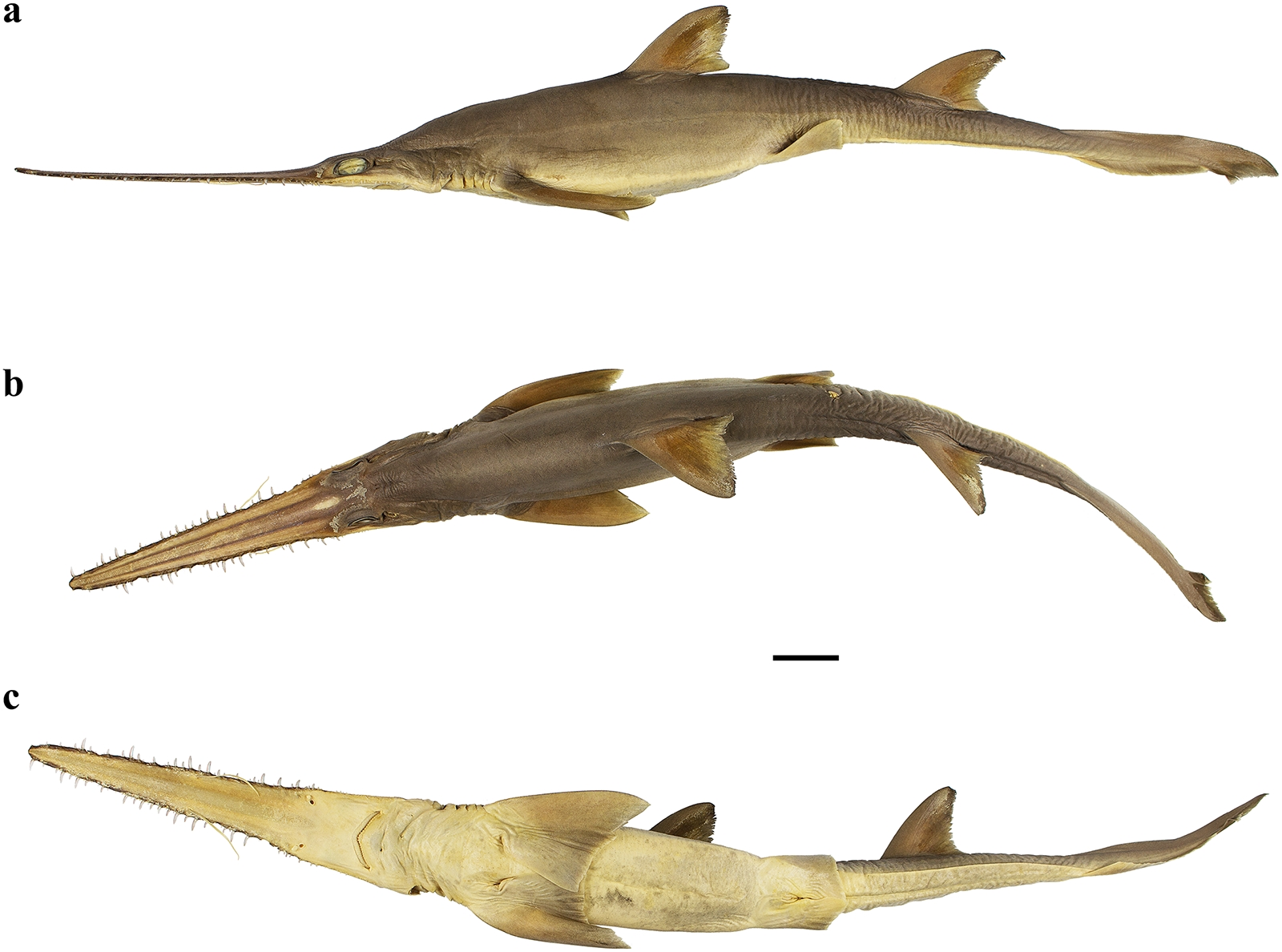

Conservation status
- Least Concern (IUCN 3.1)

Scientific classification
- Kingdom: Animalia
- Phylum: Chordata
- Class: Chondrichthyes
- Subclass: Elasmobranchii
- Division: Selachii
- Order: Pristiophoriformes
- Family: Pristiophoridae
- Genus: Pliotrema
- Species: P. warreni

Binomial name
- Pliotrema warreni Regan, 1906
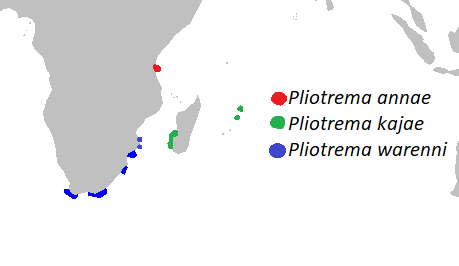
- Range of sixgill sawshark shark (in blue)

= Sixgill sawshark =

Sixgill sawshark Temporal range: 23–0 Ma Miocene to Present

Species of shark

The sixgill sawshark, Pliotrema warreni is a sawshark of the family Pristiophoridae. Unlike other sawsharks, the barbs on this shark's rostrum continue onto the sides of the head. Its barbels are also closer to its mouth than in other species. At maximum, females can reach over 136 cm (54 in) long, and males can reach over 112 cm (44 in) long.

== Range and habitat ==
The sixgill sawshark is found in the temperate and subtropical waters of the western Indian Ocean between latitudes 23° S and 37° S, at depths of between 37 and 500 m (120 and 1,640 ft). This shark lives in the benthic and benthopelagic zones of the continental shelf. Adults are partially segregated from juveniles, as they naturally tend to aggregate at lower depths.

== Behavior ==
Using their sensitive barbels and electric sense, sixgill sawsharks are able to find their prey and then incapacitate them with their rostrum. Their known diet includes small fish, crustaceans, and squids. The only observed predator of the sixgill sawshark is the tiger shark, though it is likely other large sharks predate this species. These sharks, like other sawsharks, are ovoviviparous. They are thought to breed annually, giving birth to around five to seven pups per litter. It is possible that they come to inshore pupping grounds to give birth. The pups are around 35 cm (14 in) at birth, and they later mature at around 83 cm (33 in) if they are male, and around 110 cm (43 in) if they are female.

== Conservation ==
The sixgill sawshark is listed as Least Concern by the IUCN Red List. Though they are not sought after in any market, they are frequently caught as by-catch and disposed. Because of their deep habitat, sixgill sawsharks are not considered a threat to people.

== See also ==
- List of prehistoric cartilaginous fish
