= Lana's sawshark =

Scientific classification
- Kingdom: Animalia
- Phylum: Chordata
- Class: Chondrichthyes
- Subclass: Elasmobranchii
- Division: Selachii
- Order: Pristiophoriformes
- Family: Pristiophoridae
- Genus: Pristiophorus
- Species: P. lanae

Binomial name
- Pristiophorus lanae Ebert & Wilms, 2013
- Range of Lana's sawshark

Species of shark

Lana's sawshark (Pristiophorus lanae) or the Philippine sawshark, is a sawshark of the family Pristiophoridae, found in the Philippines off Apo Island and southern Luzon at depths of between 230 and 590 m. Its length is up to 73 cm.

Max length : 66.9 cm TL male/unsexed, 83.0 cm TL (female)

Its reproduction is presumed to be ovoviviparous.
