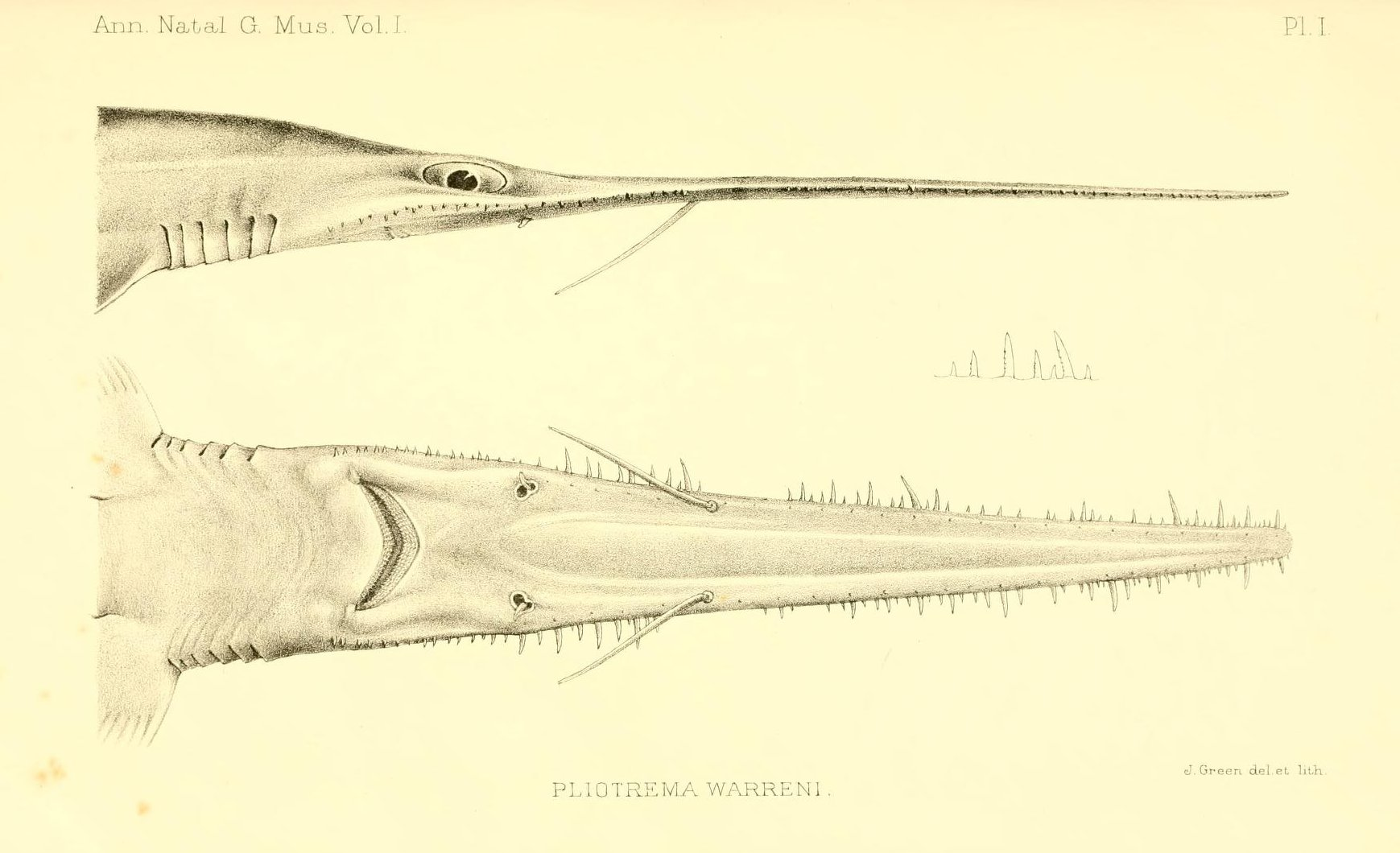
- Sixgill sawshark, (P. warreni)

Scientific classification
- Kingdom: Animalia
- Phylum: Chordata
- Class: Chondrichthyes
- Subclass: Elasmobranchii
- Division: Selachii
- Order: Pristiophoriformes
- Family: Pristiophoridae
- Genus: Pliotrema; Regan, 1906

Type species
- Pliotrema warreni Regan, 1906

= Pliotrema =

Pliotrema Temporal range: Middle Miocene–Recent

Genus of sharks

Pliotrema is a genus of sawsharks found in the Western Indian Ocean. Members of this genus differ from sawsharks of the genus Pristiophorus in having six gill slits. The presence of six pairs of gill slits highlights this genus among sharks; outside Hexanchiformes order, Pliotrema is the only shark genus with more than five gill slits. The genus was formerly monotypic, featuring only P. warreni until the two new species were described in 2020.

== Taxonomy ==
The genus name Pliotrema comes from Ancient Greek pléōn, meaning "many", and -trḗma, meaning "holes". The specific name warreni honours Ernest Warren (1871–1945), who sent specimens to the British Museum. The specific names of the two new species are named for female relatives of Simon Weigmann, the senior author - his daughter for P. kajae and his niece for P. annae.

== Species ==
There are currently three recognized species in this genus:

- Pliotrema annae Weigmann, Gon, Leeney & Temple, 2020 (Anna's sixgill sawshark)
- Pliotrema kajae Weigmann, Gon, Leeney & Temple, 2020 (Kaja's sixgill sawshark)
- Pliotrema warreni Regan, 1906 (Warren's sixgill sawshark)
