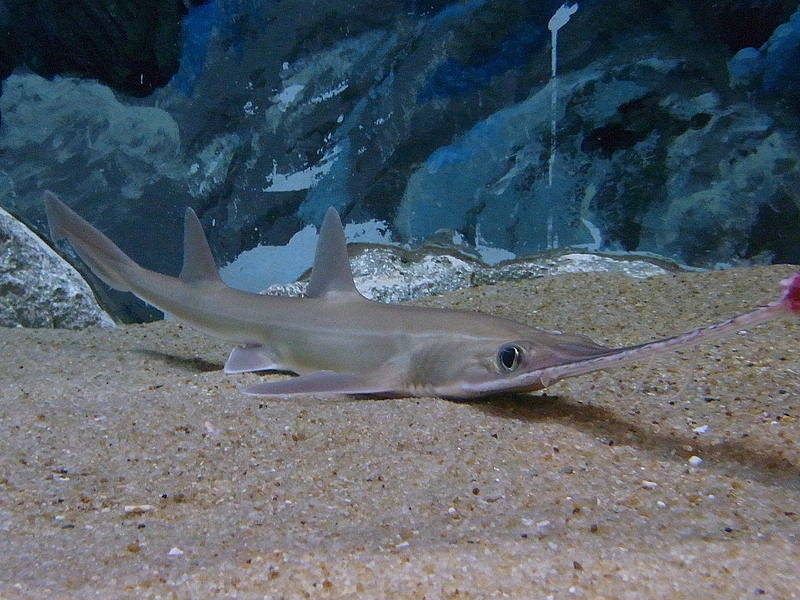

Conservation status
- Least Concern (IUCN 3.1)

Scientific classification
- Kingdom: Animalia
- Phylum: Chordata
- Class: Chondrichthyes
- Subclass: Elasmobranchii
- Division: Selachii
- Order: Pristiophoriformes
- Family: Pristiophoridae
- Genus: Pristiophorus
- Species: P. japonicus

Binomial name
- Pristiophorus japonicus Günther, 1870
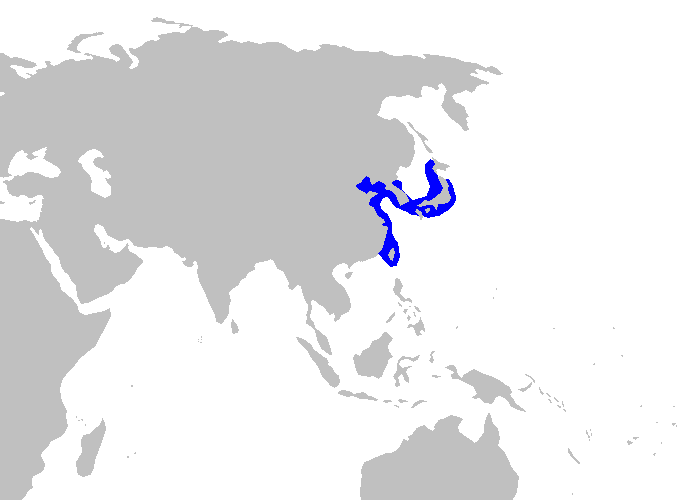
- Range of the Japanese sawshark

= Japanese sawshark =

Species of shark

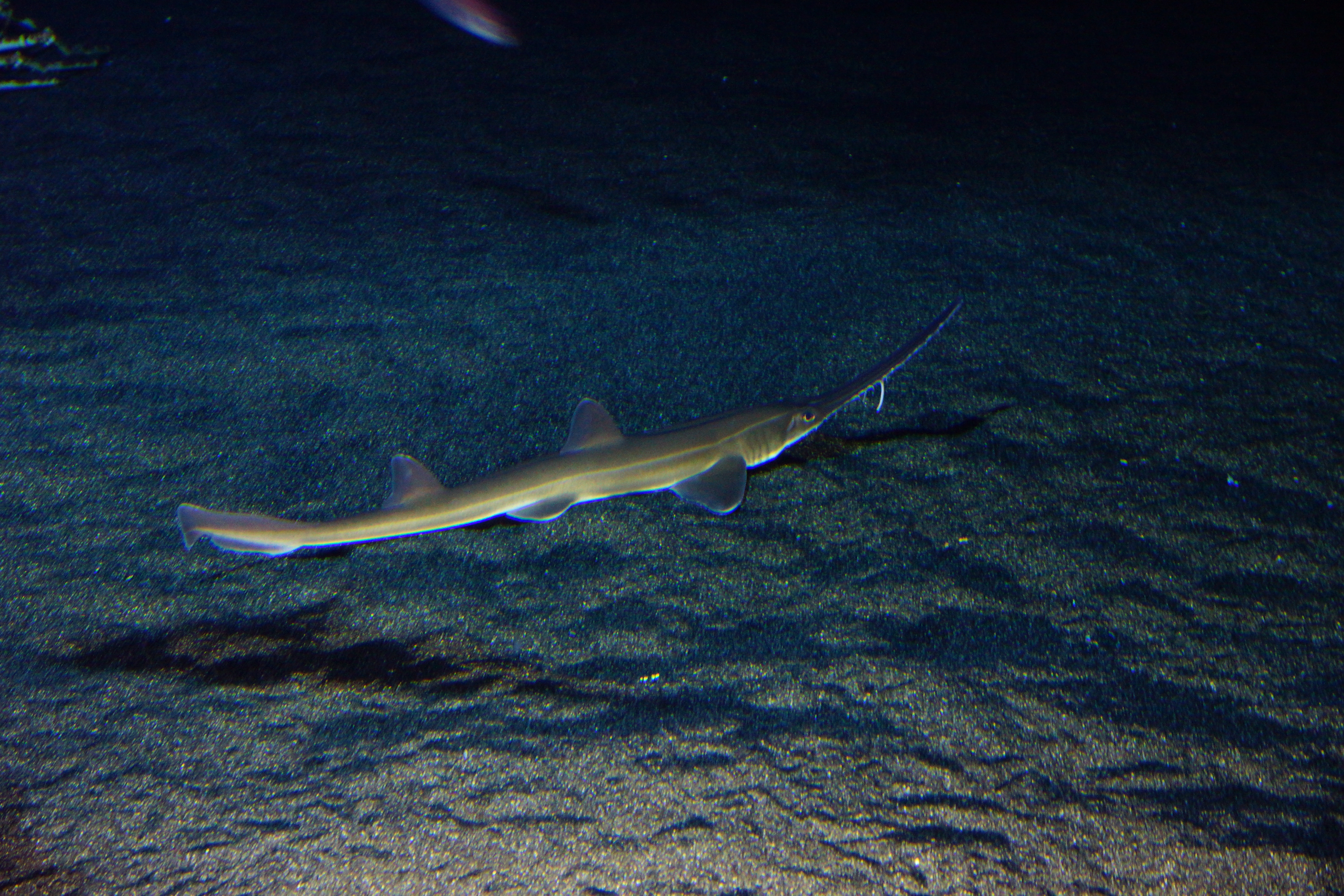
A Japanese sawshark laying on the sea-bottom

The Japanese sawshark (Pristiophorus japonicus) is a species of sawshark in the family Pristiophoridae. This shark has a long, narrow rostrum. Its first dorsal fin originates behind the tips of the pectoral fins, and its caudal fin is angled almost straight in line with the body. The Japanese sawshark reaches a maximum length of up to 1.36 m (4 ft 6 in).

== Range and habitat ==
Found in the northwest Pacific Ocean around Japan, Korea, Taiwan, and northern China between latitudes 48°N and 22°N. It is found over the sandy or muddy bottoms of the continental shelf at depths of 50 to 800 m (160 to 2,620 ft). This species may vertically migrate in the water column because of changes in temperature.

== Behavior ==
The Japanese sawshark has a varied diet of small benthic organisms. Like seemingly all sawsharks, this species is ovoviviparous. After an unknown gestation period, the female shark gives live birth to around 12 pups. These pups average around 30 cm (12 in) long. At sexual maturity the male is 80 to 100 cm (31 to 39 in) long, and the female is around 100 cm (39 in) long.

== Conservation ==
With little information on population size or frequency of bycatch, the Japanese sawshark is listed by the IUCN Red List as being Least Concern. Due to its benthic lifestyle, and because the range of this shark is heavily fished, it is safe to assume that the Japanese sawshark is at considerable risk of being caught as bycatch in bottom trawling and gillnet operations. Because of its habitat and behavior, this shark poses no threat to humans.
