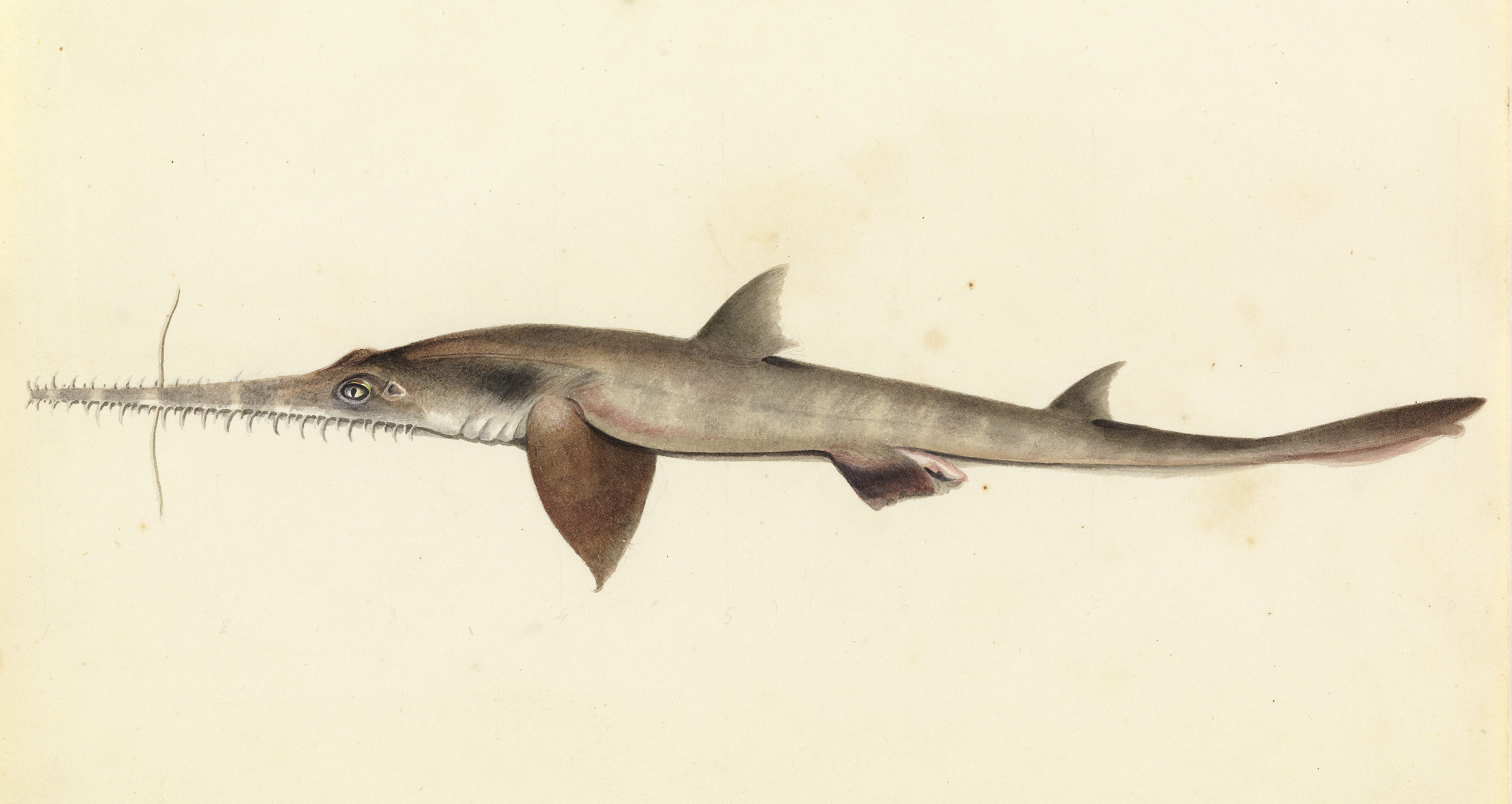
- Pristiophorus cirratus, from the Sketchbook of fishes by William Buelow Gould, 1832

Conservation status
- Least Concern (IUCN 3.1)

Scientific classification
- Kingdom: Animalia
- Phylum: Chordata
- Class: Chondrichthyes
- Subclass: Elasmobranchii
- Division: Selachii
- Order: Pristiophoriformes
- Family: Pristiophoridae
- Genus: Pristiophorus
- Species: P. cirratus

Binomial name
- Pristiophorus cirratus (Latham, 1794)
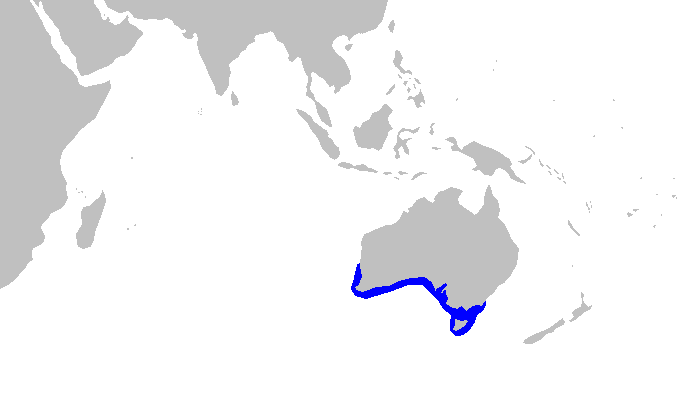
- Range of longnose sawshark (in blue)

= Longnose sawshark =

Species of shark

The longnose sawshark (Pristiophorus cirratus) or common sawshark, is a sawshark of the family Pristiophoridae.

== Description ==
The longnose sawshark has a slender, slightly flattened body with a very long rostrum that can make up to 30% of its total body length. It has pale yellow or grayish-brown dorsal coloring, white ventral coloring, and variegated, sometimes faint dark blotches, spots, and bars on its back. The barbels of the longnose sawshark are halfway down the rostrum, but slightly closer to the rostral tip than the nostrils. Its maximum length is 1.37 m (4 ft 6 in). The longnose sawshark can be confused with one of many species of sawfish, a family of rays, but is distinguished by the five gills located on the sides of its head, as opposed to sawfish which have gills located on the underside of the head.

== Distribution and habitat ==
The longnose sawshark is found in the eastern Indian Ocean around southern Australia and Tasmania on the continental shelf at depths of 20 - 600m. While it may venture into bays and estuaries on occasion, longnose sawsharks prefer sandy and gravelly areas offshore between 37–146 cm (15–57 in).

== Biology and ecology ==
Longnose sawsharks feed primarily on small crustaceans. Individuals find prey by running their barbels over the ocean floor. They use the teeth on their snouts to stir up sediment and strike prey.

Like all sawsharks, reproduction is ovoviviparous. Longnose sawsharks give birth every other winter to between 6 and 19 pups in a litter. After a 12-month gestation period, pups are born 27–37 cm (11–15 in) in length. Their teeth are folded against the snout at birth, which protects the mother from harm. Longnose sawsharks are highly productive in comparison to other shark species, maturing quickly and only living for around 15 years.

== Human interaction ==
The longnose sawshark is listed as Least Concern by the International Union for Conservation of Nature (IUCN). It used to be listed as Near Threatened, but data gathered after 2000 ultimately led to the new classification. Longnose sawsharks are highly productive and are protected by laws that keep their catch rate stable. Large tracts of their range are protected from all shark fishing, helping to buffer their population loss. Their meat is fairly popular in Australia and is said to have an excellent taste. Because of its deep habitat and overall behavior, the longnose sawshark is not a threat to humans.
