= Variegation (histology) =

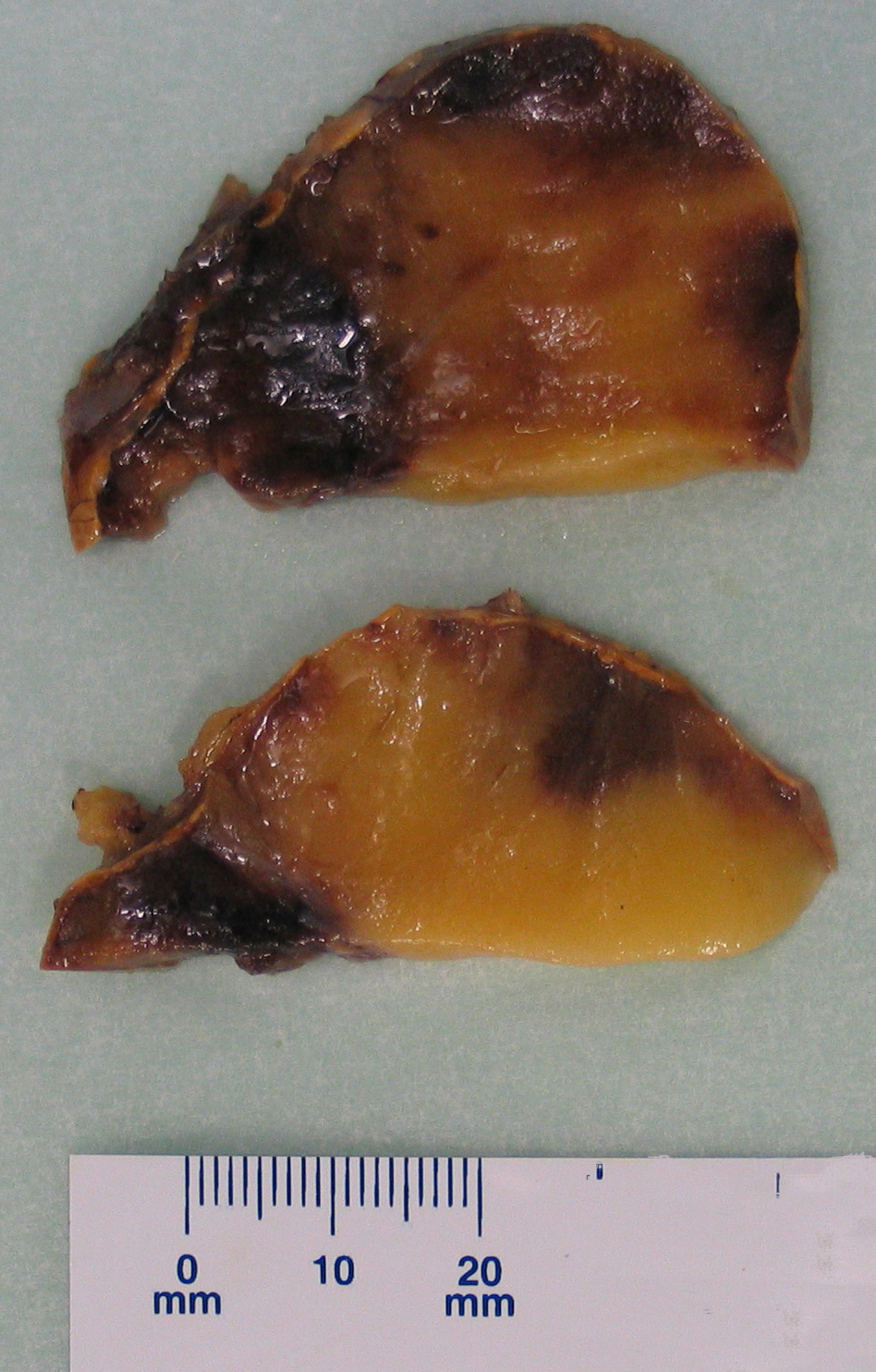
The cut surface of an adrenal myelolipoma shows colour variegation from yellow to red to brown depending on the distribution of fat, blood and myeloid elements

In histology, variegation is the property of having discrete markings of different colors.
