= Pristiophorus nancyae =

African dwarf sawshark

Scientific classification
- Kingdom: Animalia
- Phylum: Chordata
- Class: Chondrichthyes
- Subclass: Elasmobranchii
- Division: Selachii
- Order: Pristiophoriformes
- Family: Pristiophoridae
- Genus: Pristiophorus
- Species: P. nancyae

Binomial name
- Pristiophorus nancyae (Ebert & Cailliet, 2011)
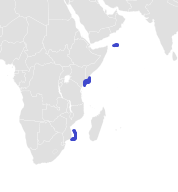
- Known range of the Dwarf sawshark

Species of shark

Pristiophorus nancyae, the African dwarf sawshark or dwarf sawshark, is a sawshark of the family Pristiophoridae. The species was discovered in 2011 when a specimen was caught off the coast of Mozambique at a depth of 1,600 ft (490 m).

== Description ==
Like other sawsharks, the African dwarf sawshark has a long "saw" like snout, or rostrum. The rostrum is edged with pointy teeth that are used for both hunting and defense. This species is noted for its general elongated and slender form and a rostrum roughly 1/3 of its total length.

This shark was named by researchers at the Pacific Shark Research Center at Moss Landing Marine Laboratories, the west coast representative of the National Shark Research Consortium. It was named after Nancy Packard of the Packard family, who has donated generously to organizations researching the oceans.

== Distribution and habitat ==
The African dwarf sawshark has primarily been found off the coast of Mozambique. Possible records of this species off the coasts of Somalia and Kenya remain unconfirmed. This sawshark lives a benthic lifestyle on the continental shelf, at depths reaching 286 to 500 m (938 to 1,640 ft).

== Behavior ==
Very little is known about the biology of the African dwarf sawshark. It would appear, based on the stomach samples taken in the field, that these sharks favor benthic invertebrates like small crustaceans. Nothing is known about the reproductive habits of this sawshark, though it is safe to assume that like other members of Pristiophoriformes it is ovoviviparous.

== Conservation ==
As the African dwarf sawshark was only recently discovered in 2011, the IUCN Red List has yet to evaluate the conservation status of this animal. Though it is not known to be utilized for food, this shark is at great risk of being caught as bycatch in shrimping and bottom trawling operations. Considering its habitat, rarity, and behavior, the African dwarf sawshark poses no threat to humans.
