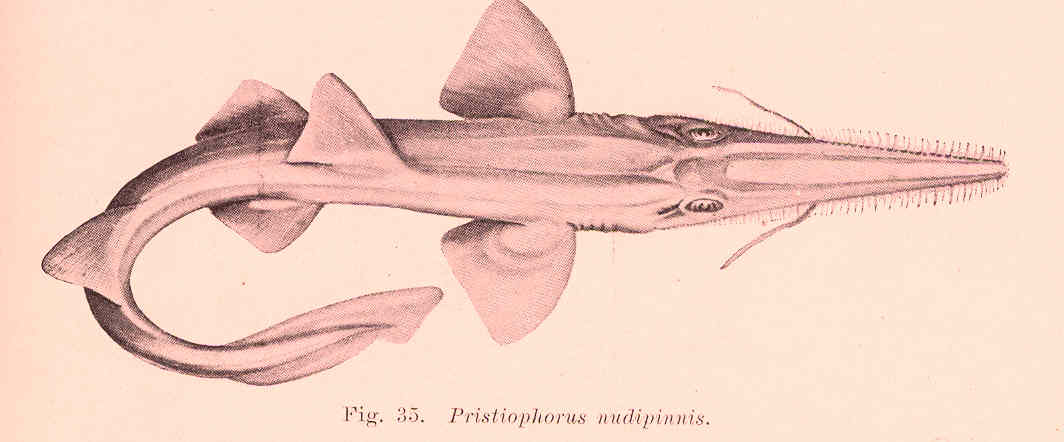

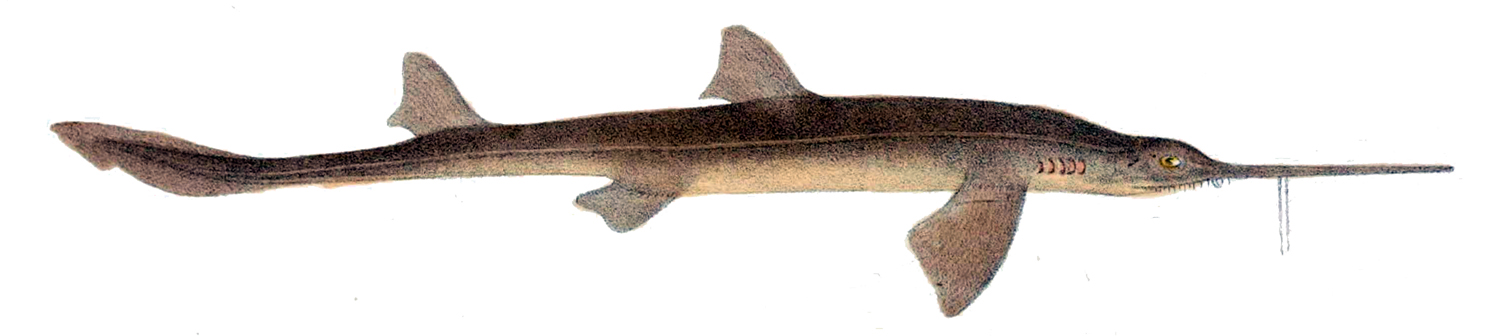

Conservation status
- Least Concern (IUCN 3.1)

Scientific classification
- Kingdom: Animalia
- Phylum: Chordata
- Class: Chondrichthyes
- Subclass: Elasmobranchii
- Division: Selachii
- Order: Pristiophoriformes
- Family: Pristiophoridae
- Genus: Pristiophorus
- Species: P. nudipinnis

Binomial name
- Pristiophorus nudipinnis Günther, 1870
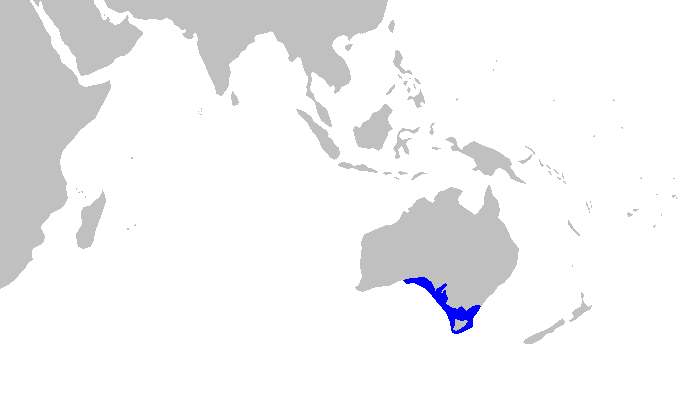
- Range of shortnose sawshark (in blue)

= Shortnose sawshark =

Species of shark

The shortnose sawshark, (Pristiophorus nudipinnis) or southern sawshark, is a sawshark of the family Pristiophoridae. The body of this shark is slightly compressed, and its rostrum is narrow. The two dorsal fins are almost identical in size. In color, the dorsal side of this sawshark tends to be uniformly slate gray, with few or no markings. The ventral side is pale white or cream. Females reach around 124 cm (49 in) long, and males reach around 110 cm (43 in) long. These sharks can live up to 9 years.

== Behavior ==
Leading a benthic lifestyle, the shortnose sawshark primarily feeds on benthic invertebrates and small bony fish. Like other sawsharks, this species' reproduction is ovoviviparous. It gives birth biannually to a litter of 7-14 pups. The size of pups at birth is about 35 cm (14 in).

== Conservation ==
Because of stable commercial catch rates, reduced Total Allowable Catch, protection in Victorian waters, and a high rate of biological productivity, the shortnose sawshark is listed as Least Concern by the IUCN Red List. While the shortnose sawshark is fairly popular commercially, the largest threat to the species is being caught as bycatch in gillnet operations. Because of its habitat, size, and behavior, this species is considered to be harmless to humans.
