= Pliotrema annae =

Anna's sixgill sawshark

Conservation status
- Data Deficient (IUCN 3.1)

Scientific classification
- Kingdom: Animalia
- Phylum: Chordata
- Class: Chondrichthyes
- Subclass: Elasmobranchii
- Division: Selachii
- Order: Pristiophoriformes
- Family: Pristiophoridae
- Genus: Pliotrema
- Species: P. annae

Binomial name
- Pliotrema annae Weigmann, Gon, Leeney & Temple, 2020
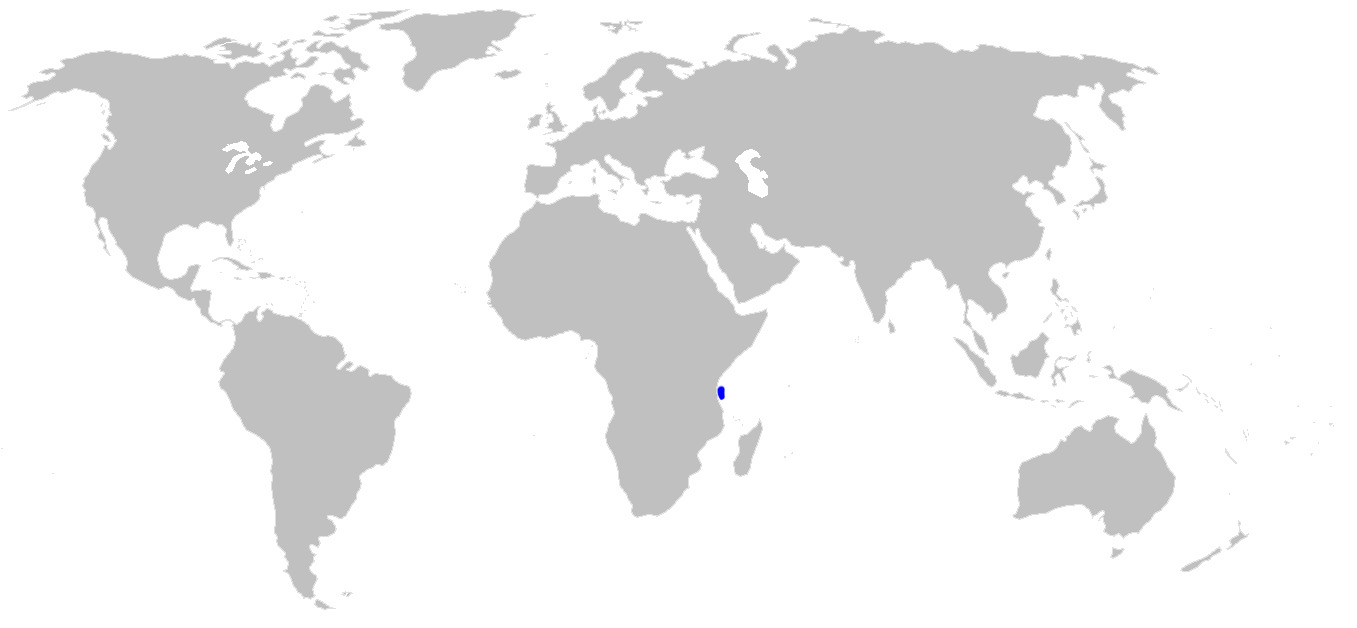
- Range of Anna's sixgill sawshark

Sawshark species

Pliotrema annae, Anna's sixgill sawshark, is a sawshark in the family Pristiophoridae found in Zanzibar (Western Indian Ocean). Until the latest observation, Pliotrema annae is known to live in shallow water at depths of 20–35 m (66–115 ft).

This shark has barbels which are located roughly half way from the rostral tip to the mouth. Its rostra are constricted between barbel origin and the nostrils.
