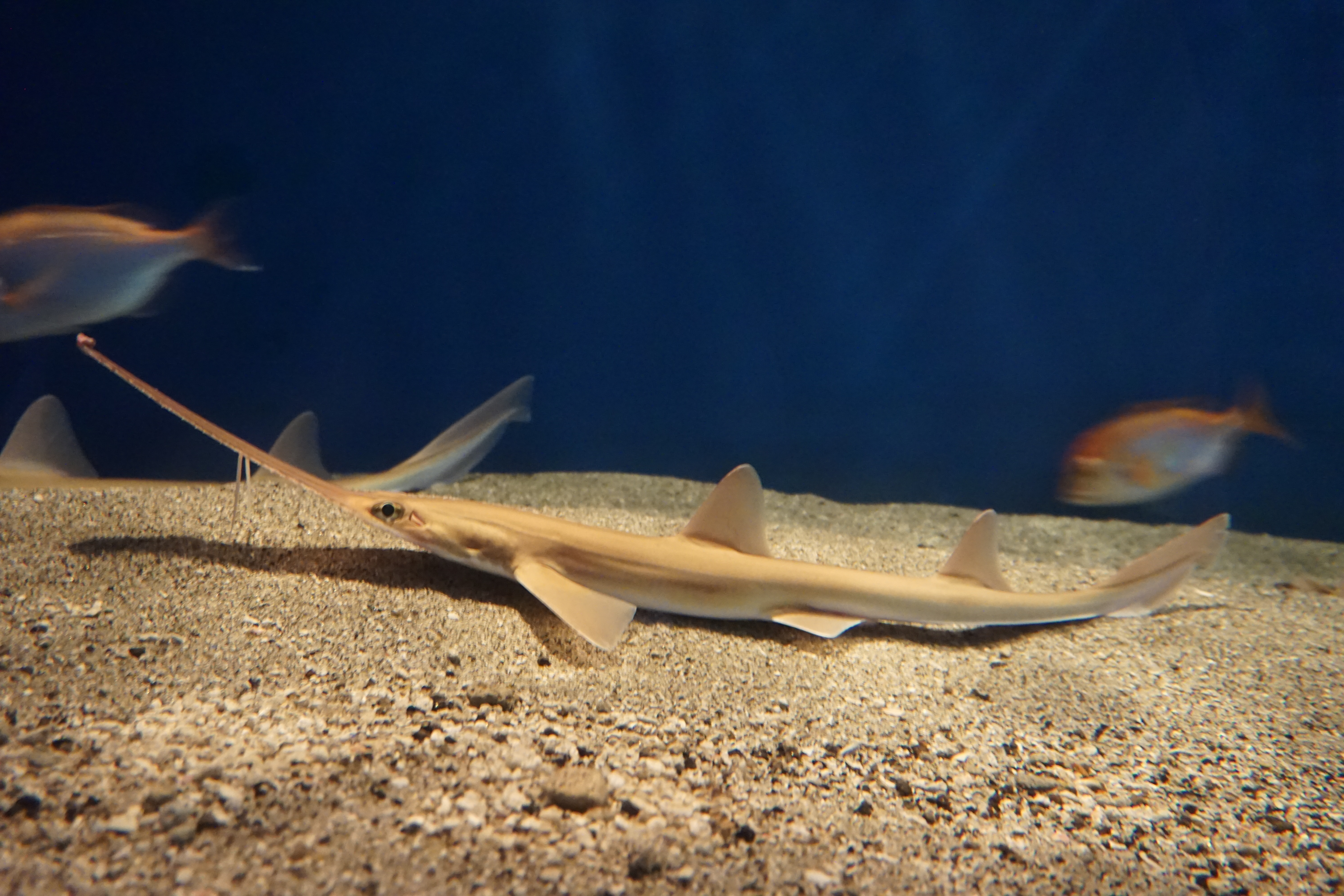
- Japanese sawshark, (P. japonicus)

Scientific classification
- Kingdom: Animalia
- Phylum: Chordata
- Class: Chondrichthyes
- Subclass: Elasmobranchii
- Division: Selachii
- Order: Pristiophoriformes
- Family: Pristiophoridae
- Genus: Pristiophorus; J. P. Müller & Henle, 1837

Type species
- Pristis cirratus Latham, 1794

= Pristiophorus =

Pristiophorus Temporal range: 86.3–Recent Ma

Genus of sharks

Pristiophorus is a genus of sawsharks found in the Pacific, Atlantic and Indian oceans. Members of this genus differ from sixgill sawsharks of the genus Pliotrema in having five gill slits. Their rostral sawteeth lack prominent transverse ridges on the basal ledges, and the large teeth are not posteriorly serrated.

== Taxonomy ==
The genus name Pristiophorus comes from Ancient Greek pristēs, meaning "saw", and -phóros, meaning "bearing".

== Species ==
There are currently seven recognized species in this genus:

- Pristiophorus cirratus (Latham, 1794) (Longnose sawshark)
- Pristiophorus delicatus Yearsley, Last & W. T. White, 2008 (Tropical sawshark)
- Pristiophorus japonicus Günther, 1870 (Japanese sawshark)
- Pristiophorus lanae Ebert & Wilms, 2013 (Lana's sawshark)
- Pristiophorus nancyae Ebert & Cailliet, 2011 (African dwarf sawshark)
- Pristiophorus nudipinnis Günther, 1870 (Shortnose sawshark)
- Pristiophorus peroniensis Yearsley, Last & W. T. White, 2008 (Eastern Australian sawshark)
- Pristiophorus schroederi S. Springer & Bullis, 1960 (Bahamas sawshark)

Fossil species

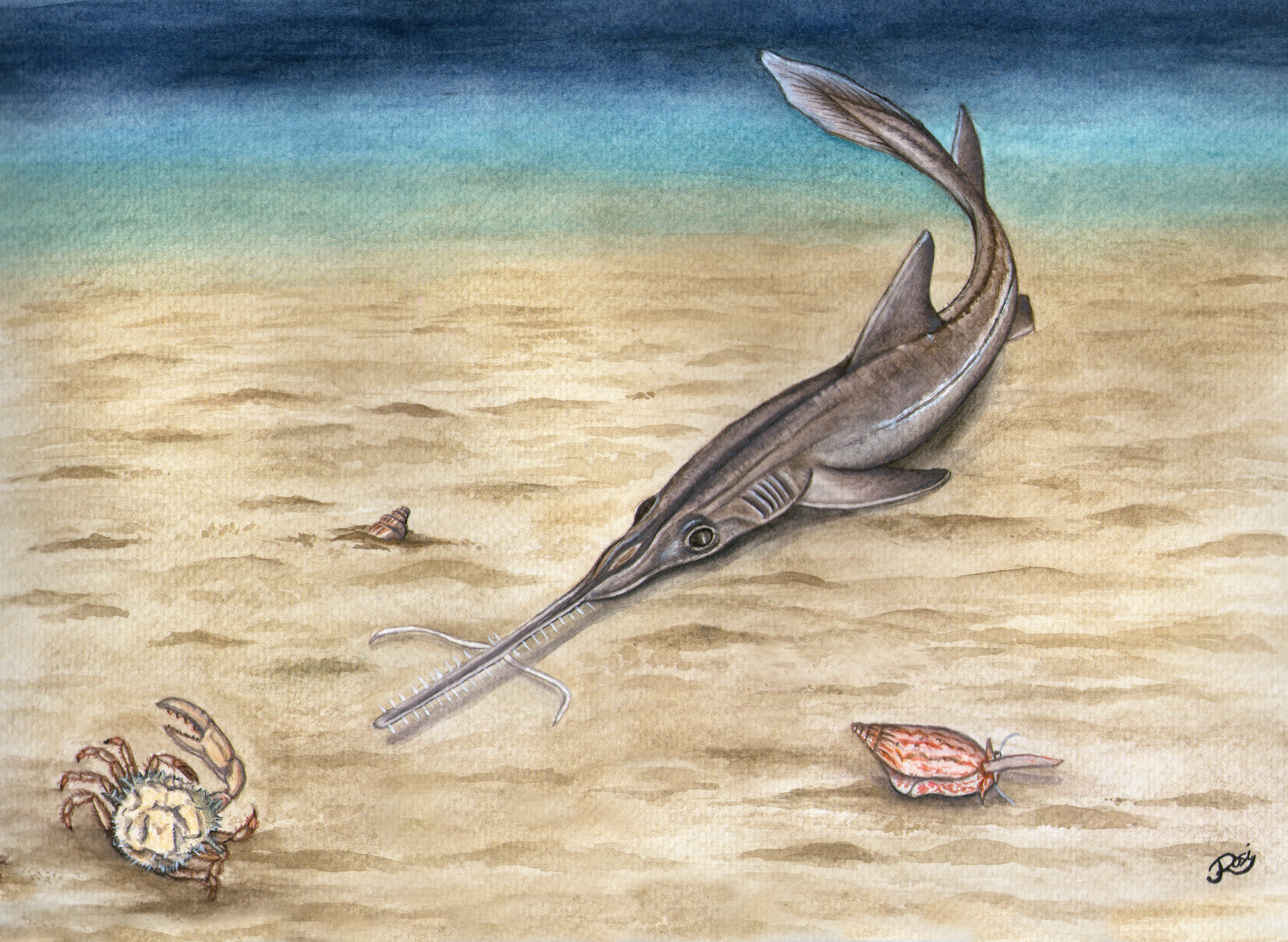
Illustration of the fossil species Pristiophorus humboldti

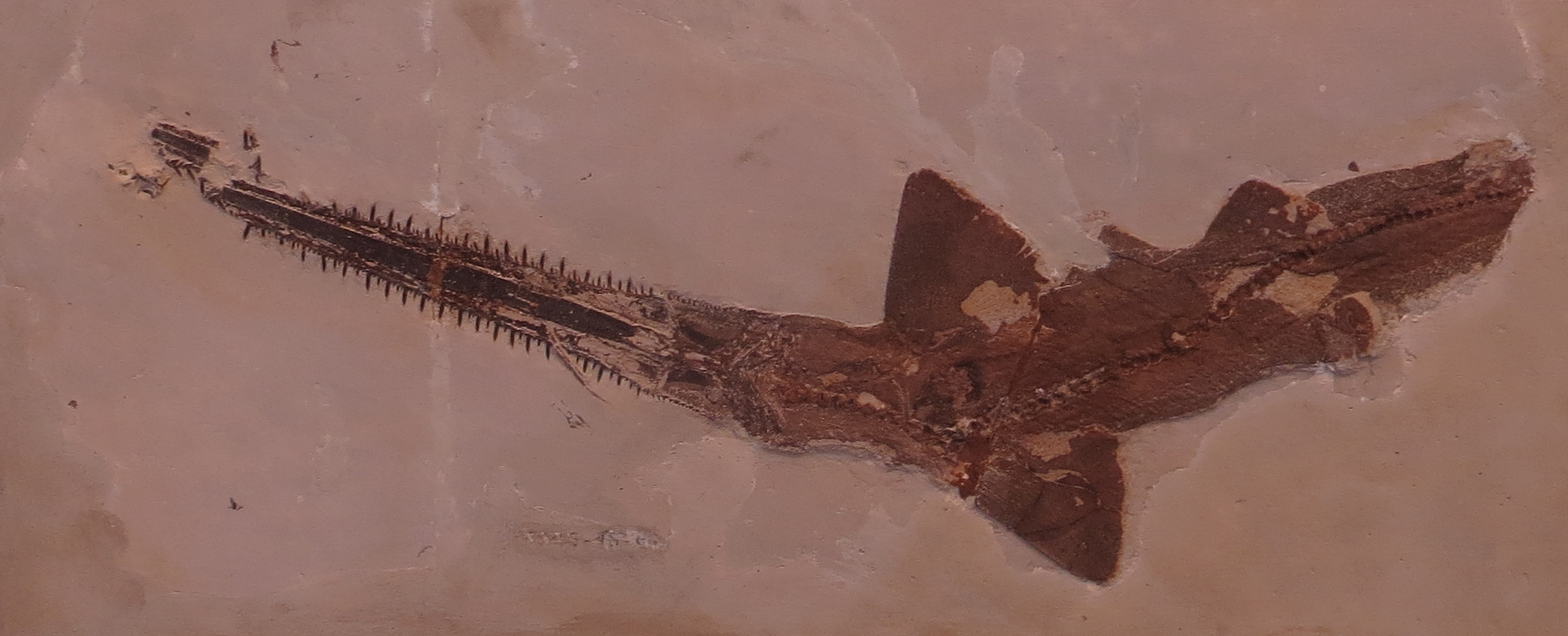
Fossil specimen of Pristiophorus tumidens (sometimes placed in the genus Propristiophorus)

Based on the Shark-References database:

- †Pristiophorus austriacus Reinecke et al., 2020
- †Pristiophorus borealis Reinecke et al., 2020
- †Pristiophorus humboldti Villafaña, Nielsen, Klug & Kriwet, 2019
- †Pristiophorus lacipidinensis Adnet, 2006
- †Pristiophorus laevis Engelbrecht, Mörs, Reguero & Kriwet, 2016
- †Pristiophorus lanceolatus Davis, 1888
- †Pristiophorus lineatus Applegate & Uyeno, 1968
- †Pristiophorus napierensis Chapman, 1918
- †Pristiophorus palaeocenicus (Herman, 1973)
- †Pristiophorus pricei Cappetta, Morrison & Adnet, 2019
- †Pristiophorus rupeliensis Steurbaut & Herman, 1978
- †Pristiophorus smithi Cappetta, Morrison & Adnet, 2019
- †Pristiophorus striatus Underwood & Schlogl, 2013
- †Pristiophorus suevicus Jaekel, 1890
- †Pristiophorus tortonicus Reinecke et al., 2020
- †Pristiophorus tumidens (Woodward, 1932)
- †Pristiophorus ungeri Reinecke et al., 2020

However, Villafaña et al. (2025) noted that the smooth rostral spines used to identify fossil Pristiophorus species may not necessarily be diagnostic to just Pristiophorus, at least in South American fossil localities on the Pacific coast. The most effective way to diagnose a fossil sawshark species to Pristiophorus, and as its own species, is via the rarely-preserved oral teeth, which tend to not be associated with the rostral spines.
