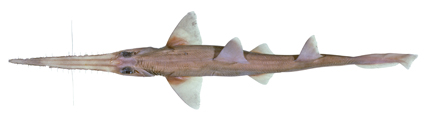

Conservation status
- Least Concern (IUCN 3.1)

Scientific classification
- Kingdom: Animalia
- Phylum: Chordata
- Class: Chondrichthyes
- Subclass: Elasmobranchii
- Division: Selachii
- Order: Pristiophoriformes
- Family: Pristiophoridae
- Genus: Pristiophorus
- Species: P. delicatus

Binomial name
- Pristiophorus delicatus Yearsley, Last & W. T. White, 2008
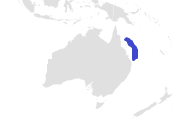
- Range of the Tropical sawshark

Synonyms
- Pristiophorus peroniensis Yearsley, Last & White, 2008

= Tropical sawshark =

Species of shark

The tropical sawshark, Pristiophorus delicatus, is a recently described species of sawshark, family Pristiophoridae, formerly known in literature as Pristiophorus sp. B. It is endemic to northeastern Australia, found on the upper continental slope off Queensland from south of the Samaurez Reef, at a depth of 246–405 meters (807–1,329 ft). Its specific epithet delicatus is Latin for "delicate", referring to the fine teeth on its saw-like rostrum.

This is a small species; the maximum known length is 85 cm (33 in) for females and 63 cm (25 in) for males (although no mature males have yet been examined). The body is slender with a circular cross-section, and depressed forward of the gill slits. The elongated, saw-like snout tapers evenly to its tip, and bears very slender lateral teeth of variable length and a pair of filamentous, dorsoventrally flattened barbels. The eyes are large and oval in shape. Its nostrils about one-third the distance from the corner of the mouth to the barbel attachment on the rostrum. The mouth is large and broadly arched; there are 47 tooth rows in the upper jaw and 37 in the lower. The teeth have flattened, oval bases and a single narrow, pointed cusp. The pectoral fins are large with narrowed rounded tips and weakly concave rear margins. The two dorsal fins are well-separated, the first longer and broader than the second. The caudal fin is short, with the lower lobe absent.

The coloration is medium brown above and white below; there are pronounced white rear margins on the dorsal and caudal fins. The paired fins are mostly pale with brownish basal portions clearly demarcated from the rest of the fin. Very little is known of the biology of the tropical sawshark; its small size may indicate that it is reproductively productive. There is little fishing pressure within its range, and so it is classified as of Least Concern by the World Conservation Union.
