= Sawshark =

Sawsharks Temporal range: Santonian-recent
- Japanese sawshark

Scientific classification
- Kingdom: Animalia
- Phylum: Chordata
- Class: Chondrichthyes
- Subclass: Elasmobranchii
- Division: Selachii
- Superorder: Squalomorphi
- Series: Squatinida
- Order: Pristiophoriformes; L. S. Berg, 1958
- Family: Pristiophoridae; Bleeker, 1859

Type species
- Pristiophorus cirratus Latham, 1794

Genera
- †Ikamauius Keyes, 1979; Pliotrema Regan, 1906; †Pochitaserra Villafaña et al., 2025; Pristiophorus J. P. Müller & Henle, 1837; ?†Propristiophorus Woodward, 1932

Family of fishes

A sawshark or saw shark is a member of a shark order (Pristiophoriformes /prɪstiˈɒfɒrɪfɔːrmiːz/) bearing a unique long, saw-like rostrum (snout or bill) edged with sharp teeth, which they use to slash and disable their prey. There are ten species within the Pristiophoriformes, the longnose or common sawshark (Pristiophorus cirratus), shortnose sawshark (Pristiophorus nudipinnis), Japanese sawshark (Pristiophorus japonicas), Bahamas sawshark (Pristiophorus schroederi), Warren's sixgill sawshark (Pliotrema warreni), Anna's sixgill sawshark (Pliotrema annae), Kaja's sixgill sawshark (Pliotrema kajae), African dwarf sawshark (Pristiophorus nancyae), Lana's sawshark (Pristiophorus lanae) and the tropical sawshark (Pristiophorus delicatus).

Sawsharks are found in many areas around the world, most commonly in waters from the Indian Ocean to the southern Pacific Ocean. They are normally found at depths around 40–100 m, but can be found much lower in tropical regions. The Bahamas sawshark was discovered in deeper waters (640 m to 915 m) of the northwestern Caribbean.

== Description and life cycle ==
Sawsharks have a pair of long barbels about halfway along the snout. They have two dorsal fins, but lack anal fins. Genus Pliotrema has six gill slits, and Pristiophorus the more usual five. The teeth of the saw typically alternate between large and small. Saw sharks reach a length of up to 5 feet and a weight of 18.7 pounds, with females tending to be slightly larger than males.

The body of a longnose saw shark is covered in tiny placoid scales: modified teeth covered in hard enamel. The body is a yellow-brown color which is sometimes covered in dark spots or blotches. This coloration allows the saw shark to easily blend with the sandy ocean floor.

These sharks typically feed on small fish, squid, and crustaceans, depending on species. The function of the sawshark barbels are not well understood, and neither is how they use their rostrum. It is possible they use it in a similar fashion as sawfishes, and hit prey with side-to-side swipes of the saw, crippling them. The saw could also be utilized against other predators in defense. The saw is covered with specialized sensory organs (ampullae of Lorenzini) which detect an electric field which is given off by buried prey.

Saw sharks life history is still poorly understood. Mating occurs seasonally in coastal areas. Saw sharks are ovoviviparous meaning eggs hatch inside the mother. They have litters of 3–22 pups every 2 years. After 12 months of pregnancy, the pups are born at 30 cm long. While in the mother, pups' rostral teeth are angled backwards to avoid harming the mother. The life expectancy of sawsharks is still poorly understood, but they are thought to live to 10 years or more.

== Human interaction ==
Among the different species of sawshark, all are listed on the IUCN Red List of 2017 as either data deficient or of least concern Saw sharks do not see much human interaction because of their deep habitats.

== Species ==
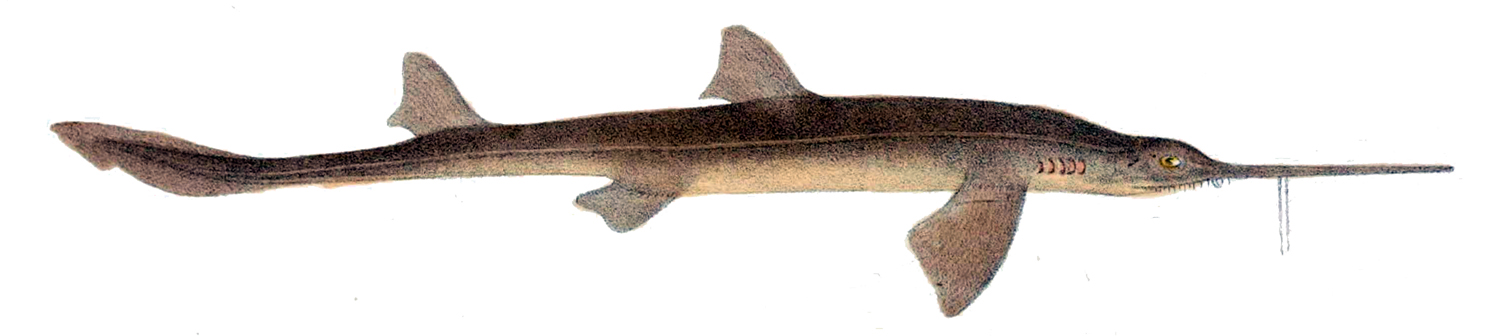
Shortnose sawshark

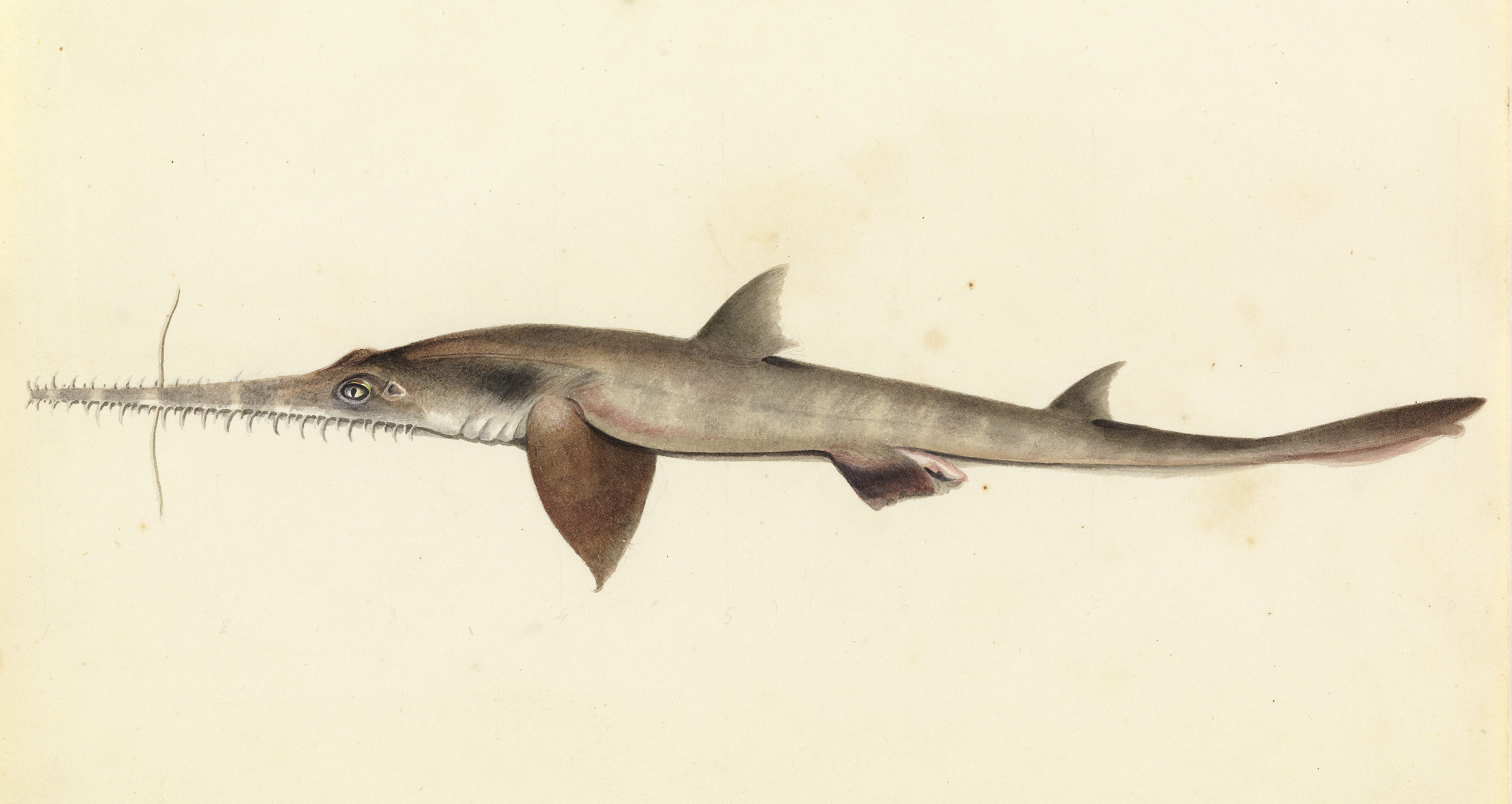
Longnose sawshark

There are currently ten known species of sawsharks across two genera in this family:

- Pliotrema Regan, 1906
  - Pliotrema annae Weigmann, Gon, Leeney & Temple, 2020 (Anna's sixgill sawshark)
  - Pliotrema kajae Weigmann, Gon, Leeney & Temple, 2020 (Kaja's sixgill sawshark)
  - Pliotrema warreni Regan, 1906 (Warren's sixgill sawshark)
- Pristiophorus J. P. Müller & Henle, 1837
  - Pristiophorus cirratus (Latham, 1794) (longnose sawshark or common sawshark)
  - Pristiophorus delicatus Yearsley, Last & White, 2008 (tropical sawshark)
  - Pristiophorus japonicus Günther, 1870 (Japanese sawshark)
  - Pristiophorus lanae Ebert & Wilms, 2013 (Lana's sawshark or Philippine Sawshark)
  - Pristiophorus nancyae Ebert & Cailliet, 2011 (African dwarf sawshark)
  - Pristiophorus nudipinnis Günther, 1870 (shortnose or southern sawshark)
  - Pristiophorus schroederi S. Springer & Bullis, 1960 (Bahamas sawshark)

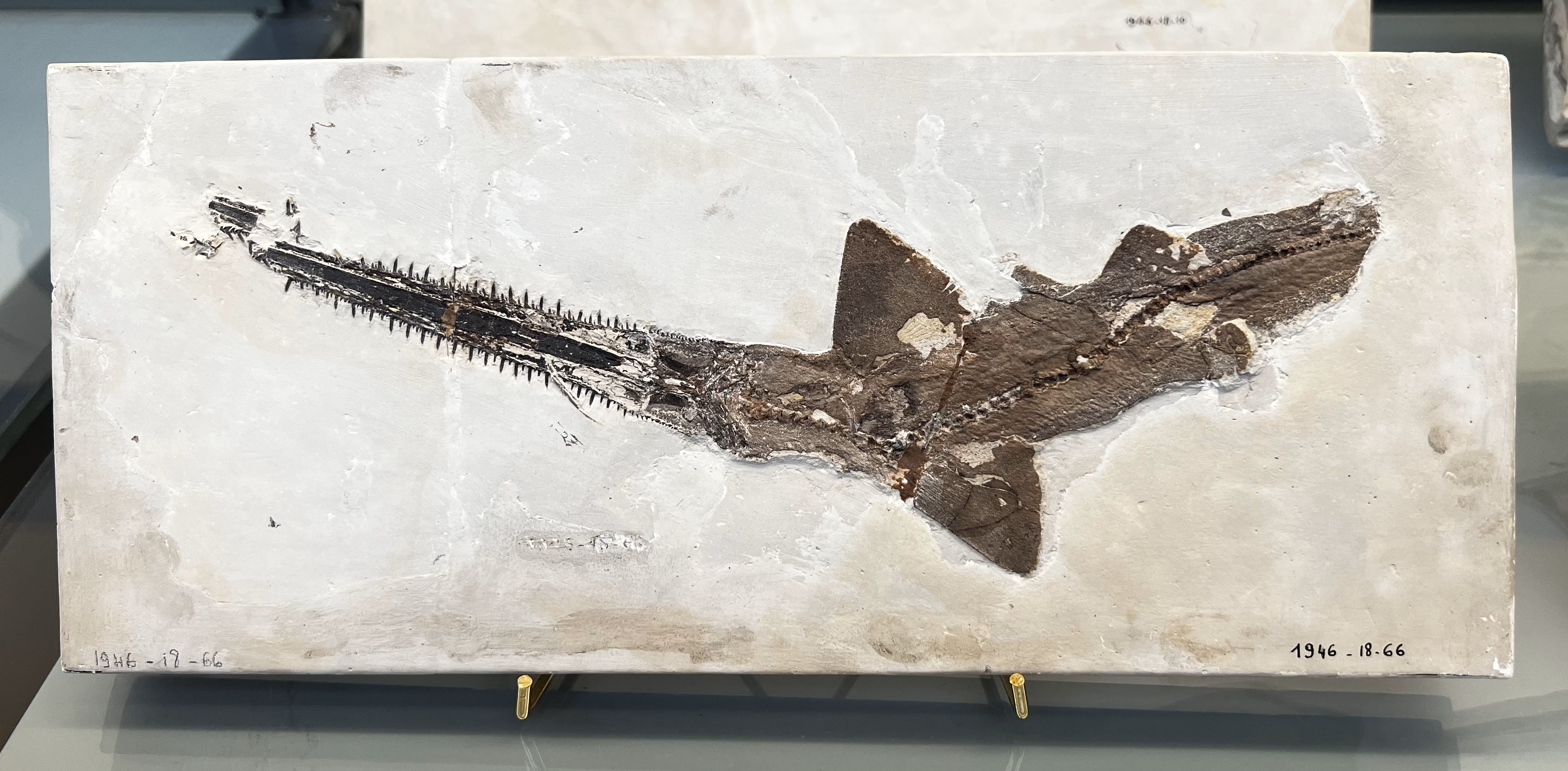
Fossil specimen of the extinct Cretaceous sawshark Pristiophorus (=Propristiophorus) tumidens

The following fossil genera are also known:

- †Ikamauius Keyes, 1979 (Eocene to Pleistocene of New Zealand)
- †Pochitaserra Villafaña et al., 2025 (Late Miocene of Chile)
- †Propristiophorus Woodward, 1932 (Late Cretaceous of Lebanon; potentially synonymous with Pristiophorus)

=== Warren's Sixgill sawshark ===
The sixgill sawshark (Pliotrema warreni) has six pairs of gills located on its sides close to the head. They are pale brown in color, with a white underbelly. Along with their color, their size sets them apart from the other types of sawfish: The females are around 136 cm where the males are around 112 cm. Sixgill sawsharks are native to the waters of southern South Africa and Madagascar.

=== Longnose or common sawshark ===
The longnose sawshark or common sawshark (Pristiophorus cirratus) has a distinctive snout longer than other sawshark species, with barbels on both sides. Near the barbels, the longnose sawshark has a pair of ampullae of Lorenzini. They are known to swim in the waters off the southern coast of Australia's continental shelf. They can also be found in the eastern portion of the Indian Ocean.

=== Shortnose or southern sawshark ===
The shortnose sawshark or southern sawshark (Pristiophorus nudipinnis) is found in south-eastern Australian waters. Much of its distribution overlaps with that of the common sawshark, however, it seems to occur less frequently. This species is similar in size as the common sawshark, but has a broader rostrum (saw) and a more brown coloration.

=== Tropical sawshark ===
The tropical sawshark (Pristiophorus delicatus) is pale brown with a yellow hue, and an underbelly that is pale yellow to white. This deep water dwelling fish is native to the northeastern shore of Australia, in depths up to 176–405 m. Due to its deep-dwelling habitat, little information is available on the species.

=== Japanese sawshark ===
The Japanese sawshark (Pristiophorus japonicus) is native to the coasts of Japan, Korea, and northern China. It has around 15–26 large rostral teeth in front of the barbels, which are equal distance from the gills to the snout, and about 9–17 teeth behind the barbels.

=== Lana's sawshark ===
Lana's sawshark (Pristiophorus lanae) is a species of sawshark that inhabits the Philippine coast. It was discovered in 1966 by Dave Ebert, who distinguished it as a new species. Lana's sawshark was named after Lana Ebert on the occasion of her graduation from the University of Francisco. It has a dark uniform brown color on the dorsal side and a pale white on the ventral side. It is slender bodied, has five gills on each side, and can grow to be around 70 cm.

=== African dwarf sawshark ===
The African dwarf sawshark (Pristiophorus nancyae) is native to the coasts of Mozambique, Kenya, and Yemen. It was first discovered in 2011 when a specimen was caught in Mozambique. The species can be distinguished from other sawsharks by its barbels, which are closer to its mouth than the end of its rostrum. It has a brownish grey color and becomes white along the ventral side.

=== Shortnose sawshark ===
The shortnose sawshark (Pristiophorus nudipinnis) is native to the coast of Australia. It is similar to the longnose sawshark; however, it has a slightly compressed body and shorter more narrow rostrum. It has 13 teeth in front of its barbels and 6 behind. The shortnose sawshark tends to be uniformly slate grey with no markings on its dorsal side and pale white or cream on its ventral side.

=== Bahamas sawshark ===
The Bahamas sawshark (Pristiophorus schroeder) is native to the coasts of Cuba, Florida, and the Bahamas, where they live in depths of 400–1000 m. As far as their appearance they can be identified by their snouts with teeth which appear as a saw, as well as their length, they are averaged at 80 cm in length.

== Comparison with sawfish ==
Saw sharks and sawfish are cartilaginous fish possessing large saws. These are the only two fish that have a long saw-like rostrum, however, there are extinct families that also possess the saw-like rostrum such as Sclerorhynchoidei, or sawskates. Although they are similar in appearances, saw sharks are distinct from sawfish. Sawfish are not sharks, but a type of ray. The gill slits of the sawfishes are positioned on the underside like a ray, but the gill slits of the saw shark are positioned on the side like a shark. Sawfish can have a much larger size, lack barbels, and have evenly sized saw-teeth rather than alternating saw-teeth of the saw shark. The saw-like rostrum shape also varies between the two families of fish, sawfish having a more broad rostrum and saw sharks demonstrating a more blade-like structure. A clear difference is that a sawfish has no barbels and a saw shark has a prominent pair halfway along the saw. The saw shark uses these like other bottom fish, as a kind of antennae, feeling the way along the ocean bottom until it finds some prey of interest. Both the saw shark and the sawfish utilize the electroreceptors on the saw, ampullae of Lorenzini, to detect the electric field given off by buried prey.

Comparison of sawsharks and sawfishes
Japanese sawshark Largetooth sawfish
| Characteristic | Sawshark | Sawfish | Sources |
|---|---|---|---|
| Gill openings | Peripheral (sides) | Ventral (underside) | |
| Barbels | Single pair of barbels on saw | No barbels | |
| Saw teeth | Alternate between large and small | Equal size | |
| Habitat | Deep offshore waters | Shallow coastal waters | |
| Size | Relatively small, reaching only 5 ft | Relatively large, reaching 23 ft | |
| Rostrum Shape | Blade-like, converging at tip | Broad, more rounded at tip | |

== See also ==
- List of sharks
