= Balloon cell nevus =

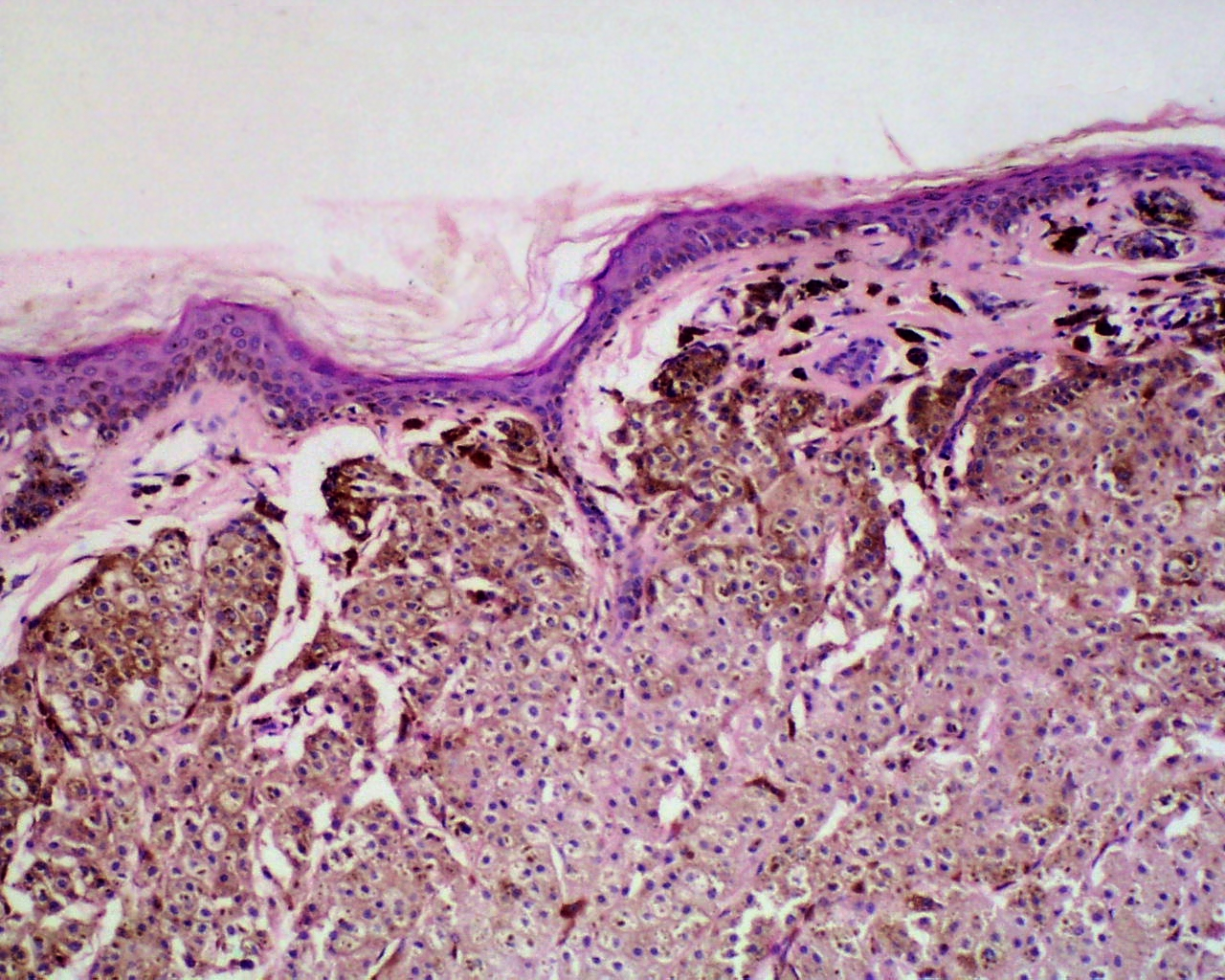
- Specialty: Dermatology

Balloon cell nevus is a benign nevus. It appears like a melanocytic nevus.

Histologically it is characterized by swollen, pale, polyhedral melanocytes, with pale cytoplasm and a central nucleus. It is different to balloon cell melanoma, which has larger nuclei and is structured like a melanoma.

It was first described by Judalaewitsch in 1901.

== Signs and symptoms ==
Balloon cell nevi can affect the skin, choroid, and conjunctiva. Usually, they appear as elevated, mobile, hyperpigmented masses in the ocular adnexa.

== Diagnosis ==
The characteristics of balloon cells include their relatively large sizes, small, round nuclei positioned in the center, and largely transparent cytoplasm.

Examining under a microscope is particularly crucial when it comes to balloon cell nevi. Progressive vacuolization of melanocytes or nevus cells, caused by the enlargement as well as eventual destruction of melanosomes, results in the formation of balloon cells.

== See also ==
- Pseudomelanoma
- Skin lesion
