= Animal-type melanoma =

Animal-type melanoma is a rare subtype of melanoma that is characterized by heavily pigmented dermal epithelioid and spindled melanocytes. Animal-type melanoma is also known to be called equine-type melanoma, pigment synthesizing melanoma, and pigmented epithelioid melanocytoma (PEM). While melanoma is known as the most aggressive skin cancer, the mortality for PEM is lower than in other melanoma types. Animal-type melanoma earned its name due to the resemblance of melanocytic tumors in grey horses.

All ages, including childhood, are susceptible to animal-type melanoma. According to recent studies, it is unknown which age group it is most prominent in and males and females are equally as likely to be impacted.

== Signs and symptoms ==
Animal-type melanoma can develop anywhere on the body, similar to general melanoma. It will be observed as arising from normal, unaffected skin, rather than skin with a pre-existing mole. Animal-type melanoma appears as a dark brown/black papule and resembles a melanocytic tumor in grey horses.

Early signs of animal-type melanoma can be summarized by the ABCDE criteria, excluding the E.

- Asymmetry
- Border irregularity
- Color variation
- Diameter more than 6mm

== Cause ==
Animal-type melanoma has the same likelihood of causes as general melanoma. Fair skin, family history, and sun damage are all common and well-known risk factors. Melanomas are usually caused by DNA damage resulting from exposure to UV light from the sun. Genetics also play a role and is responsible for melanoma occurring in skin areas with little sun exposure (i.e. mouth, feet soles, palms, and genital areas).

A weakened immune system aids in cancer development due to a lack of ability to fight cancer cells. Having more than 50 moles is also an indication of an increased risk of melanoma.

=== UV radiation ===
UVA and UVB rays are wavelengths expressed by the sun and absorbed by skin cell DNA that results in DNA damage. Exposure to radiation (UVA and UVB) is one of the major contributors to the development of melanoma. Likewise, occasional extreme sun exposure (sunburn) is related to melanoma. The use of sunbeds that contain deeply penetrating UVA rays has also been linked to the development of melanoma.

Having multiple severe sunburns increases the likelihood that future sunburns develop into melanoma. This is due to cumulative damage.

=== Genetics ===
When determining risk for melanoma, the intensity and duration of sun exposure, the age at which sun exposure occurs, and the degree of skin pigmentation all play a role. Familial melanoma is known as melanoma passed from generation to generation within a family. Two genes, CDKN2A and CDK4, have been linked to familial melanoma. When a mutation occurs in either of these genes, it will result in an increased risk of melanoma. While these two are primarily linked, the alterations in these genes only account for a small percentage of familial melanoma.

Familial melanoma follows an autosomal dominance inheritance pattern where a mutation happens in only one copy of the gene. This means a parent gene may either pass along a copy of their normal gene or a copy of the gene with the mutation.

== Diagnosis ==
By the time animal-type melanoma has been diagnosed, it likely has been a year or longer since it was first present on the skin. After a clinical assessment acknowledges a lesion on the skin that may point to melanoma, a dermascopic analysis may be required. When under analysis, animal-type melanoma appears to have a structureless blue pattern, irregular whitish structures, and irregular, large blood vessels.

If determined to be melanoma, the lesion may be removed with an excision biopsy (completely cutting out and removing a skin lesion). A histology report that determines animal-type melanoma may include:

- Heavily pigmented melanocytic tumor
- Epithelioid and splindled melanocytes
- Bland or malignant cytological appearance
- Low mitotic activity
- Infrequent ulceration
- No features to suggest regression

Due to the unknown nature of animal-type melanoma, a pathologist may find it challenging to make a definite diagnose between animal-type melanoma and blue naevi due to the similarities between the two.

== Treatment ==
Animal-type melanoma is generally excised, taking note of the clinical margin reliant on Breslow thickness. This is used as a prognostic factor in melanoma and provides a description of how deeply tumor cells have invaded.

=== Staging ===
Melanoma staging is the process of finding out if the melanoma has spread and if so, how far. This assists professionals in determining the intensity of the cancer and allows them to develop the best approach for treatment. Most melanoma specialists coincide with the American Joint Committee on Cancer (AJCC) for cutaneous melanoma staging guidelines:

Cutaneous Melanoma Staging Guidelines
Stage	Characteristics
Stage 0	In situ melanoma
Stage 1	Thin melanoma < 2mm in thickness
Stage 2	Thick melanoma > 2mm in thickness
Stage 3	Melanoma spread to involve local lymph nodes
Stage 4	Distance metastases have been detected

== See also ==
- Balloon cell nevus
- List of cutaneous conditions
