= Beauty mark =

Type of dark facial mark

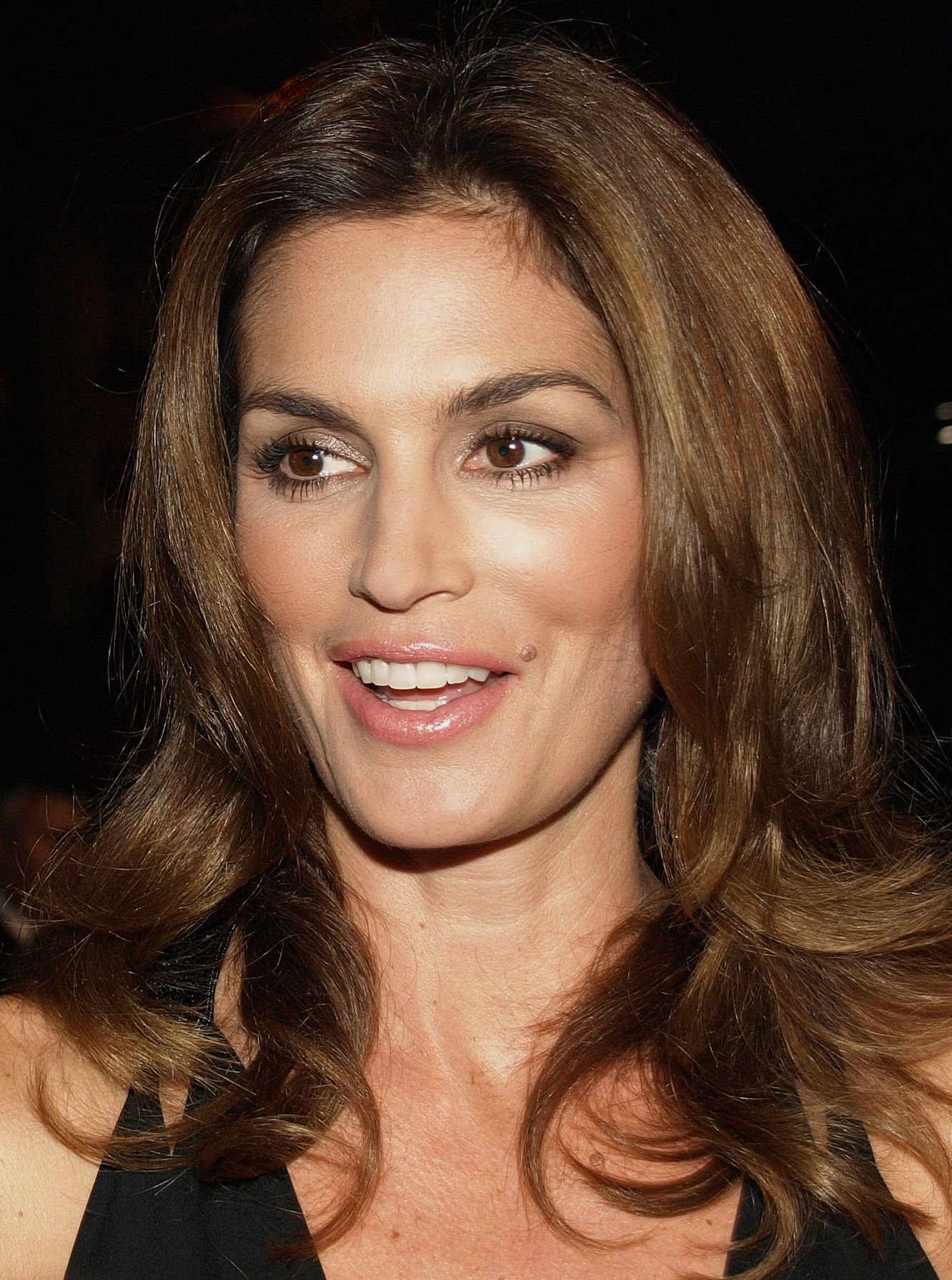
Supermodel Cindy Crawford is known for her beauty mark.

A beauty mark or beauty spot is a euphemism for a type of dark facial mark so named because such birthmarks are sometimes considered an attractive feature. Medically, such "beauty marks" are generally melanocytic nevus, more specifically the compound variant. Moles of this type may also be located elsewhere on the body, and may also be considered beauty marks if located on the face, shoulder, neck or breast. Artificial beauty marks have been fashionable in some periods.

== Artificial beauty marks ==
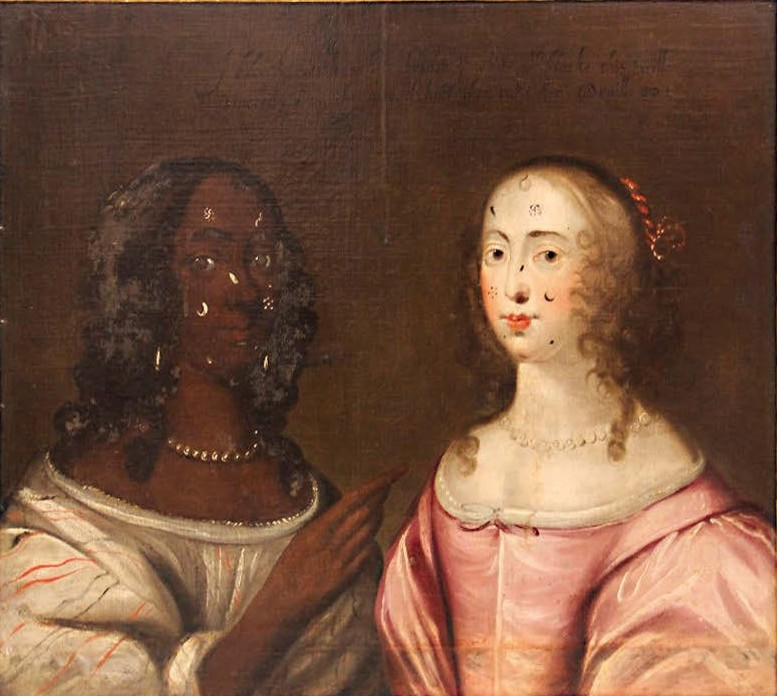
Allegorical Painting of Two Ladies, English School, c. 1650, by an anonymous hand. The two women, who appear to be of equal standing, are wearing face patches, which were a fashion of the time. The painting is captioned "I black with white bespott: you white with blacke: this evil proceeds from thy proud hart: then take her, Devill."

=== History ===
The wearing of artificial beauty marks trace back to the Roman Empire; it was believed that the godess of beauty, Venus, had a single beauty mark that accentuated her beauty. As such, beauty patches became a recognizable symbol of beauty designed to highlight the pale, unblemished skin of the wearer. In Europe, mouches (French, "flies"), became fashionable in sixteenth-century France, and the fashion persisted into the eighteenth century. When the fashion spread to Spain and the Spanish Empire they were called a chiqueador.

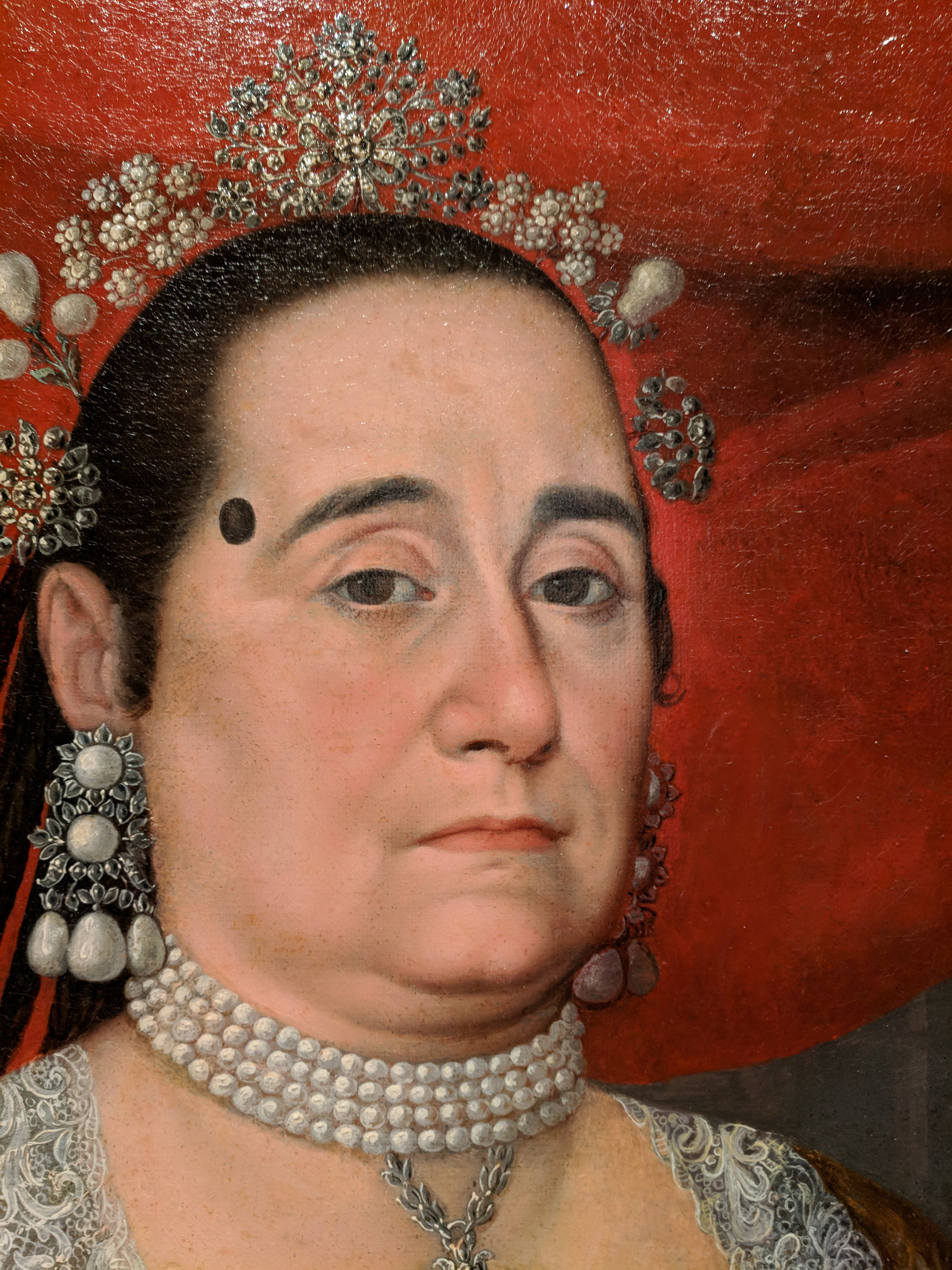
A chiqueador on a lady's temple, detail of Retrato de María Rosa de Rivera by Pedro José Diaz, Lima, Peru, 1785.

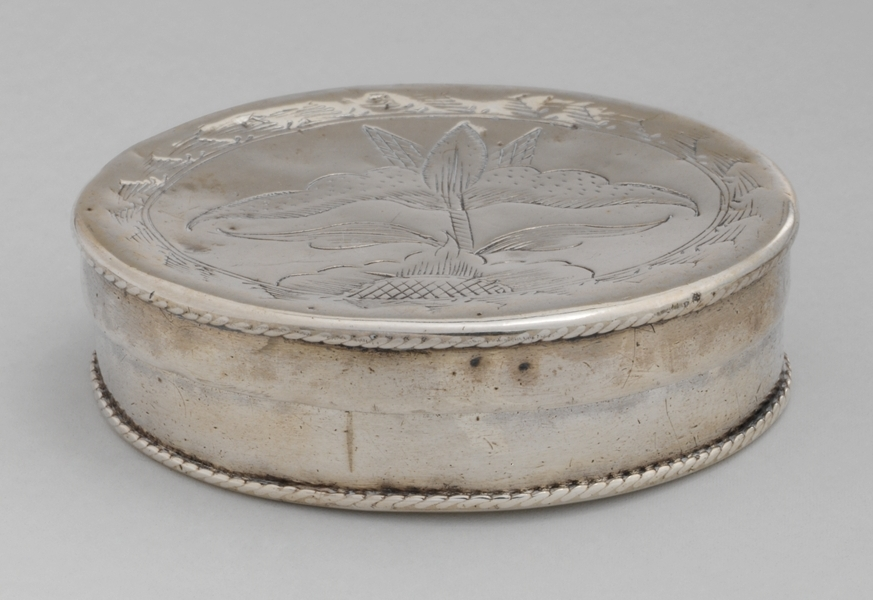
An example of a patch box from the early eighteenth-century, made of silver.

A mouche was generally made of paper, silk or velvet and was applied to the face as a form of make-up. They were kept in a patch box, or boîte à mouches ("box of flies"), and were often fanciful shapes such as hearts or stars. Patch boxes were often ornate, silver boxes, and formed an essential part of a woman's boudoir. Fashion prints from the late seventeenth century show women with an increasing number of beauty marks in a variety of sizes and shapes, placed on the cheeks, chins, and forehead.

Besides their decorative value, the patches could hide smallpox scars or syphilis sores, as well as acne. In 1668, the English diarist Samuel Pepys recorded attending the theatre and witnessing Barbara Villiers, one of the King's mistresses "called to one of her women… for a little patch off her face, and put it into her mouth and wetted it, and so clapped it upon her own by the side of her mouth, I suppose she feeling a pimple rising there." Contemporary satire or beauty manuals like R. Smith's A Wonder of Wonders: or, a Metamorphosis of fair Faces voluntarily transformed into foul Visages attested the wearing of patches could "turn botches into beauty."

=== Criticism of the beauty patch ===
Moral commentators in the early modern period increasingly expressed concern about the wearing of beauty patches, and linked it to sexual immorality and prostitution. The British diarist and intellectual John Evelyn referred to the wearing of patches, and make-up more general, as a "most ignominious thing". Other commentators saw the wearing of a black patch as a physical symbol of the wearers black morals, or soul, commonly attributing the wearing of patches to signs of the wearer's vanity. However, despite moral outcry, patches continued to be worn by men and women of diverse social ranks.

=== Contemporary beauty patches ===
Natural beauty marks are also often enhanced with color from an eyebrow pencil or pen.

== See also ==
- Bindi
- Dimple
- Freckles
