= Instruments used in dermatology =

Instruments and devices commonly used in dermatologic procedures include surgical instruments, electrosurgical devices, lasers, and cryotherapy equipment such as cryoprobes.

- Cautery or Diathermy: used to remove unwanted hair, moles, warts, et cetera
- Lasers: for surgeries
- Cryoprobes: used to remove unwanted, moles, warts, ctinic keratoses, seborrheic keratoses et cetera
