= Melanocytic nevus =

Benign skin tumor of pigment-producing cells

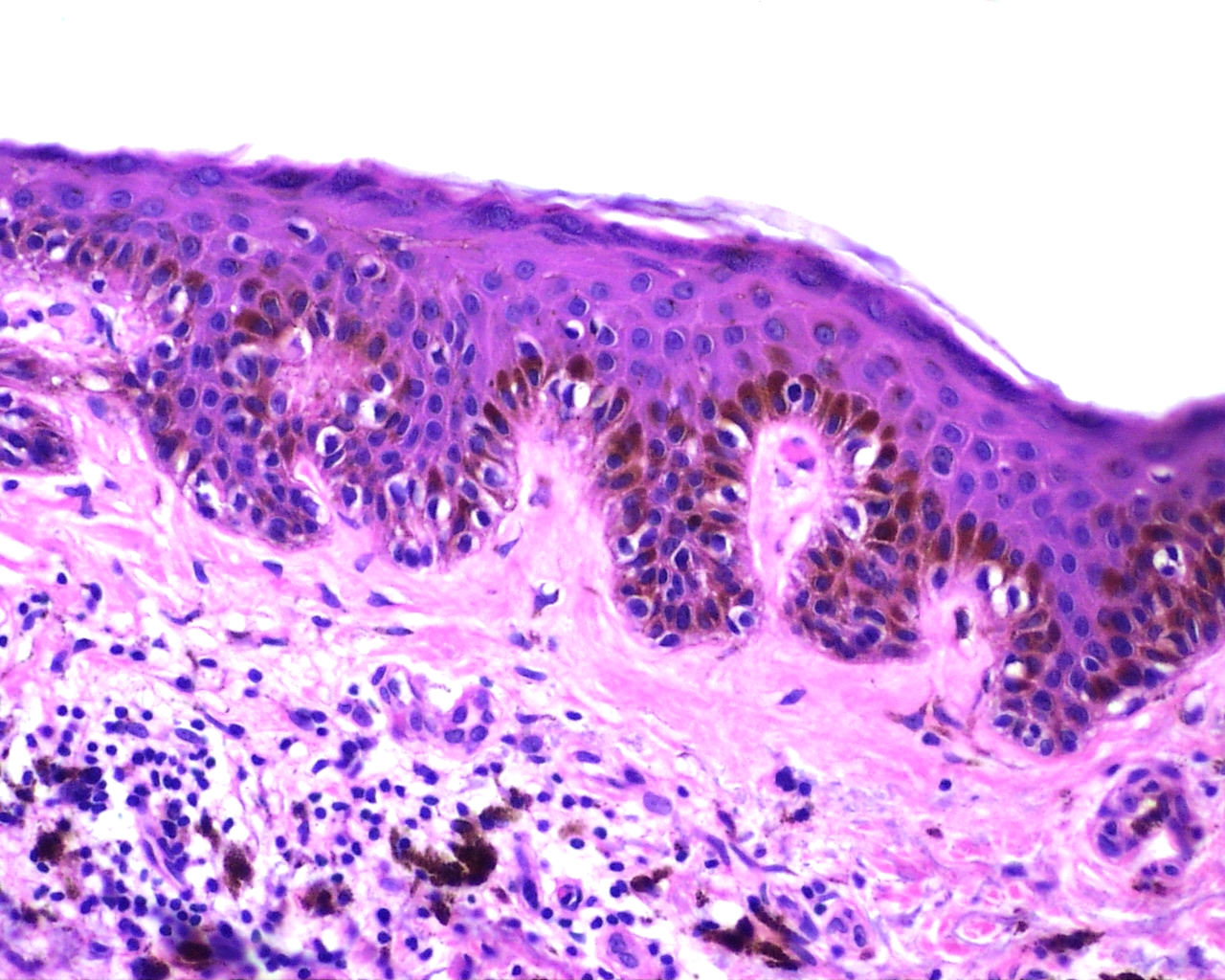
- Lentiginous melanocytic naevus
- Specialty: Dermatology

A melanocytic nevus (also known as nevocytic nevus, nevus-cell nevus, and commonly as a mole) is a usually noncancerous condition of pigment-producing skin cells. It is a type of melanocytic tumor that contains nevus cells. A mole can be either subdermal (under the skin) or a pigmented growth on the skin, formed mostly of a type of cell known as a melanocyte. The high concentration of the body's pigmenting agent, melanin, is responsible for their dark color. Moles are a member of the family of skin lesions known as nevi (singular "nevus"), occurring commonly in humans. Some sources equate the term "mole" with "melanocytic nevus", but there are also sources that equate the term "mole" with any nevus form.

The majority of moles appear during the first two decades of a person's life, with about 1 in every 100 babies being born with moles. Acquired moles are a form of benign neoplasm, while congenital moles, or congenital nevi, are considered a minor malformation or hamartoma and may be at a higher risk for melanoma.

== Signs and symptoms ==
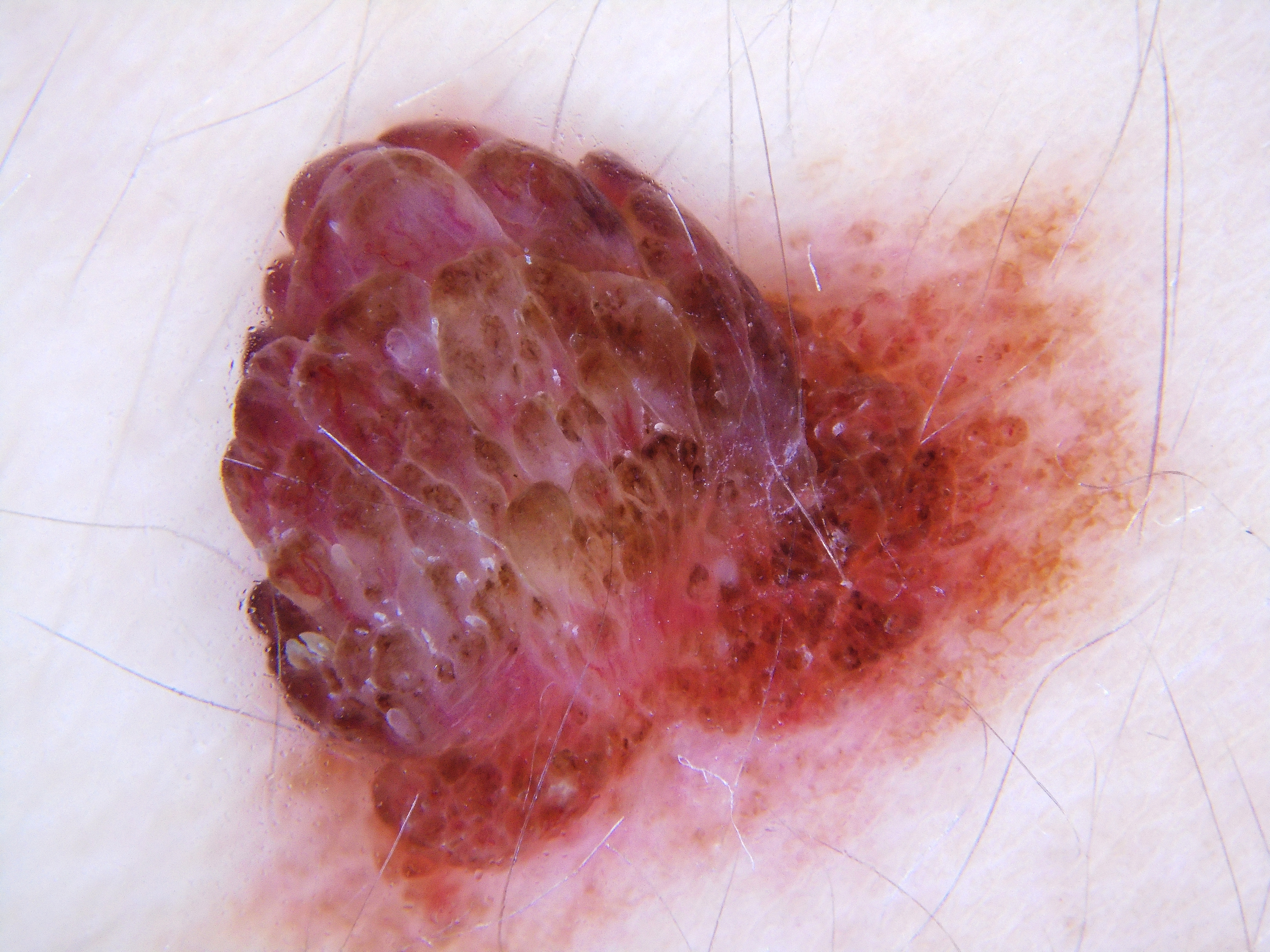
Intradermal melanocytic nevus (dermatoscopic image)

According to the American Academy of Dermatology, the most common types of moles are skin tags, raised moles, and flat moles. Benign moles are usually brown, tan, pink, or black (the latter especially on dark-colored skin). They are circular or oval and are usually small (commonly 1–3 mm), though some can be larger than the size of a typical pencil eraser (>5 mm). Some moles produce dark, coarse hair. Common mole hair removal procedures include plucking, cosmetic waxing, electrolysis, threading, and cauterization.

=== Aging ===
Moles tend to appear during early childhood and during the first 30 years of life. They may change slowly, becoming raised, changing color, or gradually fading. Most people have between 30 and 40 moles, but some have as many as 600.

The number of moles a person has was found to have a correlation with telomere length. However, the relation between telomeres and aging remains uncertain.

=== Complications ===
The American Academy of Dermatology says that the vast majority of moles are benign. Data on the chances of transformation from melanocytic nevus to melanoma are controversial, but it appears that about 10% of melanomas have a precursor lesion, of which about 10% are melanocytic nevi. Therefore, it appears that melanoma quite seldom (1% of cases) has a melanocytic nevus as a precursor.

== Cause ==
The cause of this condition is not clearly understood, but it is thought to result from a defect in embryologic development during the first 12 weeks of pregnancy. The defect is thought to cause a proliferation of melanocytes, the cells responsible for normal skin color. When melanocytes are produced at an extremely rapid rate, they form in clusters instead of spreading out evenly, resulting in abnormal skin pigmentation in some areas of the body.

=== Genetics ===
Genes can influence a person's moles. Dysplastic nevus syndrome is a largely hereditary condition that causes a person to have a large quantity of moles (often 100 or more), with some larger than normal or atypical. This often leads to a higher risk of melanoma, a serious type of skin cancer. Dysplastic nevi are more likely than ordinary moles to become cancerous. While dysplastic nevi are common, and many people have a few of these abnormal moles, having more than 50 ordinary moles also increases the risk of developing melanoma.

In the general population, a slight majority of melanomas do not form in existing moles but rather create new growths on the skin. Somewhat surprisingly, this pattern also applies to those with dysplastic nevi. These individuals are at a higher risk of melanoma occurring not only where there is an existing mole but also in areas without moles. Consequently, such persons need regular examinations to check for changes in their moles and to identify any new ones.

=== Sunlight ===
Ultraviolet (UV) light from the sun causes premature ageing of the skin and skin damage that can lead to melanoma. Researchers hypothesized that overexposure to UV, including excessive sunlight, may play a role in the formation of acquired moles. However, more research is needed to determine the complex interaction between genetic makeup and overall UV exposure. Some strong indications supporting this hypothesis (but falling short of proof) include:

- The relative lack of moles on the buttocks of people with dysplastic nevi
- The known influence of sunlight on freckles (spots of melanin on the skin, distinct from moles)

Studies have found that sunburns and excessive sun exposure can increase risk factors for melanoma. This is in addition to the higher risk already faced by individuals with dysplastic nevi (the uncertainty is regarding acquiring benign moles). To prevent and reduce the risk of melanoma caused by UV radiation, the American Academy of Dermatology and the National Cancer Institute recommend:

- Staying out of the sun between 10 a.m. and 4 p.m. standard time (or whenever one's shadow is shorter than one's height)
- Wearing long sleeves and trousers
- Wearing hats with a wide brim
- Applying sunscreens
- Wearing sunglasses that have UV-deflecting lenses

== Diagnosis ==
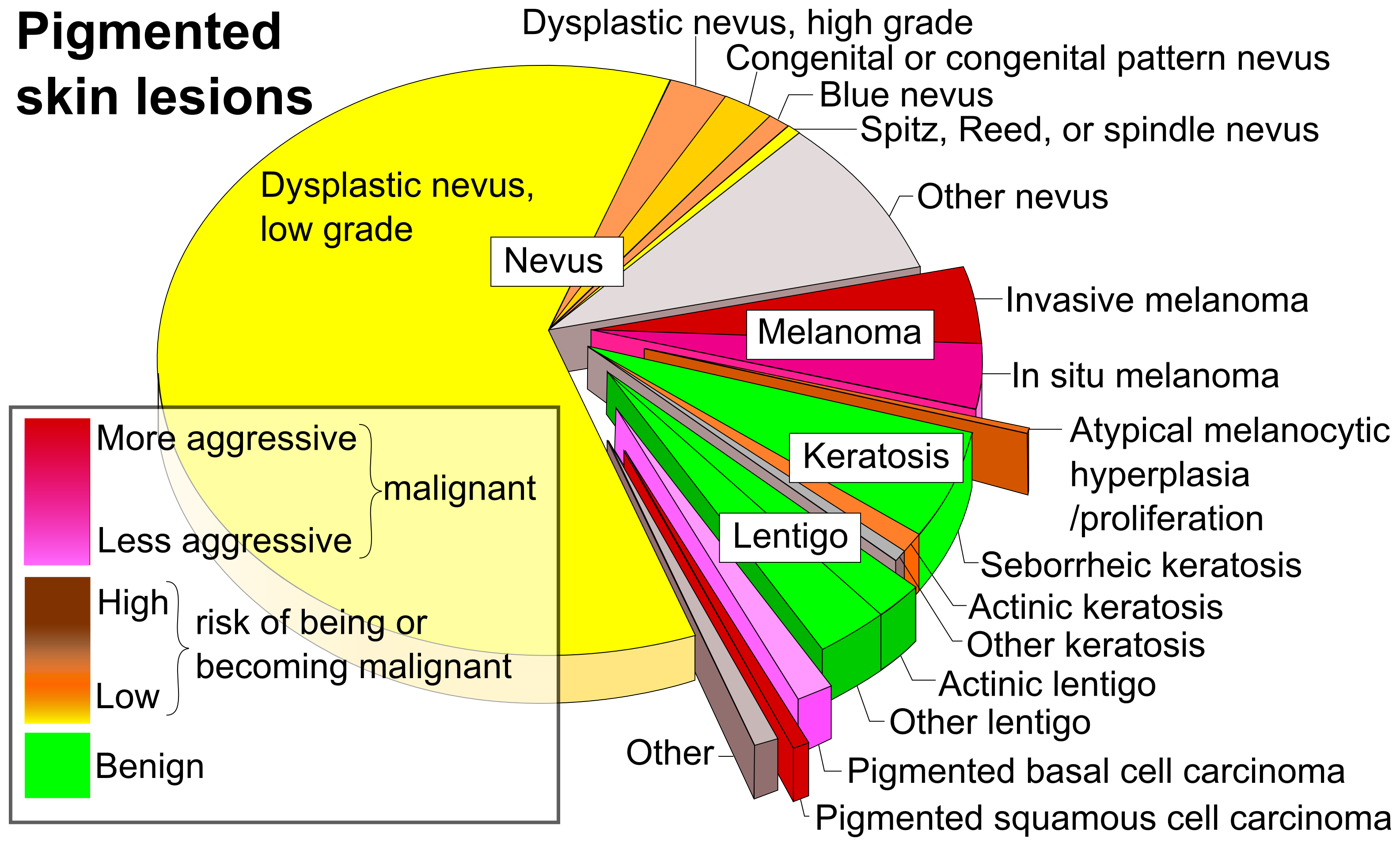
Various differential diagnoses of pigmented skin lesions, including nevi, showing the relative incidence of biopsied lesions, and their malignancy potential.

Clinical diagnosis can be made with the naked eye using the ABCD guideline or by using dermatoscopy. An online-screening test is also available to help screen out benign moles.

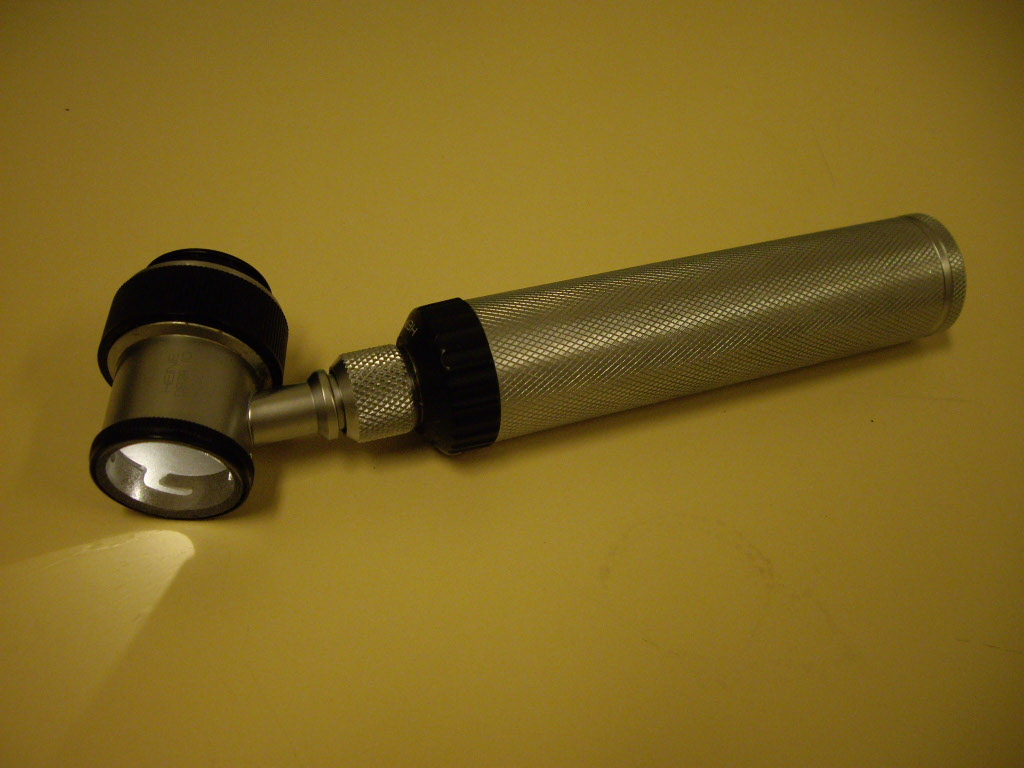
A dermatoscope.

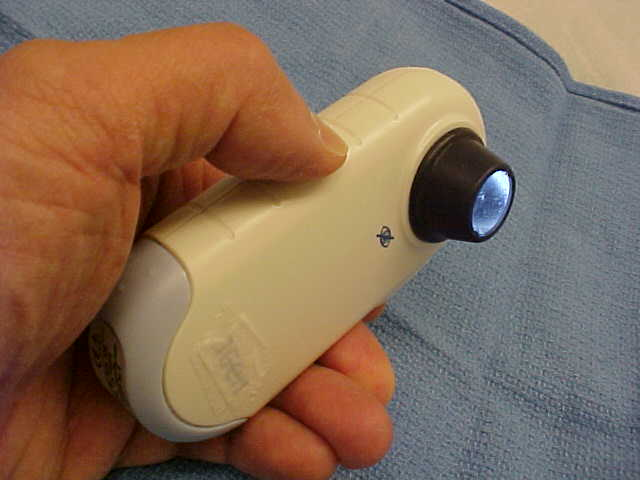
A modern polarized dermatoscope.

=== Classification ===
Melanocytic nevi can mainly be classified by depth, being congenital versus acquired, and/or specific dermatoscopic or histopathologic patterns:

Depth

Depth class	Location of nevus cells	Other characteristics	Image	ICD code
Junctional nevus	Along the junction of the epidermis and the underlying dermis.	May be colored and slightly raised.		ICD10: D22; ICDO: M8740/0
Compound nevus	Both the epidermis and dermis.			ICD10: D22 (ILDS D22.L14); ICDO: 8760/0
Intradermal nevus	Within the dermis.	A classic mole or birthmark. It typically appears as an elevated, dome-shaped bump on the surface of the skin.		

Congenital versus acquired

- Congenital nevus: Small to large nevus present at or near time of birth. Small ones have low potential for forming melanomas, however the risk increases with size, as in the giant pigmented nevus.
- Acquired nevus: Any melanocytic nevus that is not a congenital nevus or not present at birth or near birth.

Specific dermatoscopic or histopathologic patterns

Type	Characteristics	Photo- graphy	Histo- pathology
Dysplastic nevus	Usually a compound nevus with cellular and architectural dysplasia. Like typical moles, dysplastic nevi can be flat or raised. While they vary in size, dysplastic nevi are typically larger than normal moles and tend to have irregular borders and irregular coloration. Hence, they resemble melanoma, appear worrisome, and are often removed to clarify the diagnosis. Dysplastic nevi are markers of risk when they are numerous, such as in people with dysplastic nevus syndrome. According to the National Institute of Health (NIH), doctors believe that, when part of a series or syndrome of multiple moles, dysplastic nevi are more likely than ordinary moles to develop into the most virulent type of skin cancer called melanoma.	In this case, the central portion is a complex papule, and the periphery is macular, irregular, indistinct and slightly pink.	Characteristic rete ridge bridging, shouldering, and lamellar fibrosis. H&E stain.
Blue nevus	It is blue in color as its melanocytes are very deep in the skin.		Characteristic pigmented melanocytes between bundles of collagen. H&E stain.
Spitz nevus	A distinct variant of intradermal nevus, usually in a child.	They are raised and reddish (non-pigmented).	Characteristic vertically arranged nests of cells ("hanging bananas"). H&E stain.
Giant pigmented nevus	Large, pigmented, often hairy congenital nevi. They are important because melanoma may occasionally (10 to 15%) appear in them.		
Nevus of Ito and nevus of Ota	Congenital, flat brownish lesions on the face or shoulder.	Nevus of Ito.	
Mongolian spot	Congenital large, deep, bluish discoloration which generally disappears by puberty. It is named for its association with East Asian ethnic groups but is not limited to them.		

Recurrence

Recurrent nevus: Any incompletely removed nevus with residual melanocytes left in the surgical wound. It creates a dilemma for the patient and physician, as these scars cannot be distinguished from a melanoma.

=== Differentiation from melanoma ===
It often requires a dermatologist to fully evaluate moles. For instance, a small blue or bluish-black spot, often called a blue nevus, is usually benign but often mistaken for melanoma. Conversely, a junctional nevus, which develops at the junction of the dermis and epidermis, is potentially cancerous.

A basic approach to evaluating suspicious moles is found in the mnemonic A-B-C-D, used by institutions such as the American Academy of Dermatology and the National Cancer Institute (NCI). The letters stand for Asymmetry, Border, Color, and Diameter. Sometimes, the letter E (for Elevation or Evolving) is added. According to the American Academy of Dermatology, if a mole starts changing in size, color, shape or, especially, if the border of a mole develops ragged edges or becomes larger than a pencil eraser, it would be an appropriate time to consult with a physician. Other warning signs include a mole, even if smaller than a pencil eraser, that is different from the others and begins to crust over, bleed, itch, or become inflamed. Such changes may indicate the development of melanomas.

Another method of melanoma detection is the "ugly duckling sign". It is simple, easy to teach, and highly effective in detecting melanoma. Simply, correlation of common characteristics of a person's skin lesion is made. Lesions which greatly deviate from the common characteristics are labeled as an "ugly duckling", and further professional exam is required. The "little red riding hood sign", suggests that individuals with fair skin and light colored hair might have difficult-to-diagnose melanomas.

Extra care and caution should be rendered when examining such individuals, as they might have multiple melanomas and severely dysplastic nevi. A dermatoscope must be used to detect "ugly ducklings", as many melanomas in these individuals resemble non-melanomas or are considered to be "wolves in sheep's clothing". These fair-skinned individuals often have lightly pigmented or amelanotic melanomas, which will not present easy-to-observe color changes and variation in colors. The borders of these amelanotic melanomas are often indistinct, making visual identification without a dermatoscope very difficult.

People with a personal or family history of skin cancer or of dysplastic nevus syndrome (multiple atypical moles) should see a dermatologist at least once a year to be sure they are not developing melanoma.

== Management ==
First, a diagnosis must be made. If the lesion is suspected to be skin cancer, a skin biopsy may be done before considering removal. Alternatively, an excisional biopsy with complete removal of the lesion may be done. Other reasons for removal may be cosmetic or because a raised mole interferes with daily life (e.g., shaving).

If a melanocytic nevus is suspected of being a melanoma, it needs to be sampled or removed via skin biopsy, and sent for microscopic evaluation by a pathologist. Depending on the size and location of the original nevus, a complete excisional skin biopsy or a punch skin biopsy can be done. Removal can also occur by shaving. Shaving leaves a red mark on the site but changes to the patient's usual skin color in about 2 weeks. However, there might still be a risk of spread of the melanoma, so the methods of melanoma diagnosis, including excisional biopsy, are still recommended even in these instances. Moles can also be removed by laser, surgery, or electrocautery.

Medical lasers can be used to remove flat moles (those level with the surface of the skin), as well as some raised moles, leaving a scab. Some dermatologists think lasers are not the best method for removing moles because the laser only cauterizes or, in certain cases, removes very superficial levels of skin. Moles tend to go deeper into the skin than non-invasive lasers can penetrate. A second concern about laser treatment is that if the lesion is a melanoma and was misdiagnosed as a benign mole, the procedure might delay diagnosis. If the mole is incompletely removed by the laser, and the pigmented lesion regrows, it might form a recurrent nevus.

For surgery, many dermatologic and plastic surgeons first use a freezing solution, usually liquid nitrogen, on a raised mole and then shave it away with a scalpel. If the surgeon opts for the shaving method, they usually also cauterize the stump. However, freezing should not be done to a nevus suspected to be a melanoma, as the ice crystals can cause pathological changes called "freezing artifacts" which might interfere with the diagnosis of the melanoma.

Electrocautery is a procedure that uses an electrical current to burn moles, skin tags, and warts off the skin. Electric currents are set to a level such that they only reach the outermost layers of the skin, thus reducing the problem of scarring. Approximately 1–3 treatments may be needed to completely remove a mole. Typically, a local anesthetic is applied to the treated skin area before beginning the mole removal procedure.

=== Mole removal risks ===
The risks associated with mole removal vary depending on the method employed (e.g., surgical excision, shave removal, or laser therapy). In general, patients may experience mild postoperative discomfort, which is typically manageable with over-the-counter analgesics. Localized redness and the formation of a scab are also common but usually resolve within 1–2 weeks as the wound heals. Third, similar to other surgeries, there is also risk of infection, bleeding, allergic reactions to anesthesia, or even nerve damage. Lastly, the mole removal may leave an uncomfortable scar depending on the mole's size.

== Society and culture ==
Abraham Lincoln famously had a mole

Throughout much of human history, individuals with facial moles were often subject to ridicule, superstition, and stigma. Far from being viewed as marks of beauty, facial moles were commonly associated with negative imagery and folklore. In particular, moles located on the nose, cheeks, or chin were frequently linked to witches or other undesirable creatures, reflecting cultural beliefs that cast them as disfiguring or ominous growths rather than natural features.

During the Salem witch trials, warts and other dermatological lesions such as moles, scars, and other blemishes found on accused women were considered evidence of a pact with the devil.

=== Face mole reading ===
In traditional Chinese culture, facial moles are used in divination or fortune telling (moleomancy). Moles that can be easily seen may be considered warnings or reminders, while hidden moles may symbolize good luck and fortune. Furthermore, traditional Chinese culture holds that each facial mole indicates the presence of a corresponding mole on another part of the body. For instance, if a mole is present around the mouth, a corresponding mole should be found in the pubic region.

== See also ==
- Mole map
- Beauty mark
