= Pseudomelanoma =

- Specialty: Dermatology, oncology

Pseudomelanoma (also known as a "recurrent melanocytic nevus", and "recurrent nevus") is a cutaneous condition in which melanotic skin lesions clinically resemble a superficial spreading melanoma at the site of a recent shave removal of a melanocytic nevus.

== Problem with the recurrent nevus ==
The melanocytes left behind in the wound regrow in an abnormal pattern. Rather than the even and regular lace like network, the pigments tends to grow in streaks of varying width within the scar. This is often accompanied by scarring, inflammation, and blood vessel changes – giving both the clinical and histologic impression of a melanoma or a severe dysplastic nevus. When the patient is reexamined years later without the assistance of the original biopsy report, the physician will often require the removal of the scar with the recurrent nevus to assure that a melanoma is not missed.

== Saucerization biopsy ==
Also known as "scoop", "scallop", or "shave" excisional biopsy, or "shave excision". A trend has occurred in dermatology over the last 10 years with the advocacy of a deep shave excision of a pigmented lesion An author published the result of this method and advocated it as better than standard excision and less time-consuming. The added economic benefit is that many surgeons bill the procedure as an excision, rather than a shave biopsy. This save the added time for hemostasis, instruments, and suture cost. The great disadvantage, seen years later is the numerous scallop scars, and a very difficult to deal with lesions called a "recurrent melanocytic nevus". What has happened is that many "shave" excisions does not adequately penetrate the dermis or subcutaneous fat enough to include the entire melanocytic lesion. Residual melanocytes regrow into the scar. The combination of scarring, inflammation, blood vessels, and atypical pigmented streaks seen in these recurrent nevus gives the perfect dermatoscopic picture of a melanoma. When a second physicians re-examine the patient, he or she has no choice but to recommend the reexcision of the scar. If one does not have access to the original pathology report, it is impossible to tell a recurring nevus from a severely dysplastic nevus or a melanoma. As the procedure is widely practiced, it is not unusual to see a patient with dozens of scallop scars, with as many as 20% of the scars showing residual pigmentation. The second issue with the shave excision is fat herniation, iatrogenic anetoderma, and hypertrophic scarring. As the deep shave excision either completely remove the full thickness of the dermis or greatly diminishing the dermal thickness, subcutaneous fat can herniate outward or pucker the skin out in an unattractive way. In areas prone to friction, this can result in pain, itching, or hypertrophic scarring.

== See also ==
- Balloon cell nevus
- Skin lesion
- List of cutaneous conditions
