= Moleosophy =

Divination technique using bodily marks

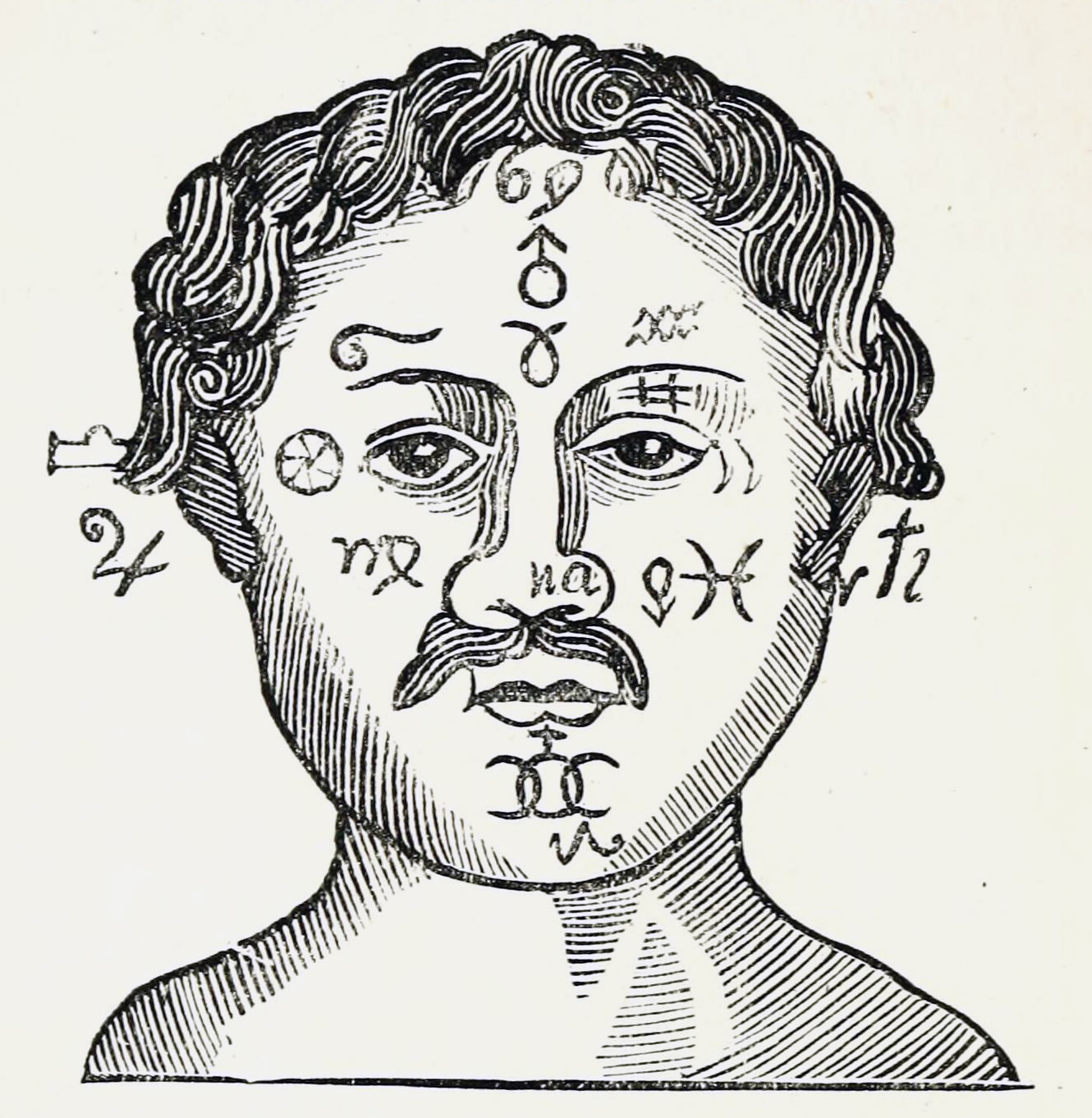
The Signification of Moles, illustration of an 18th-century chapbook

Moleosophy or moleomancy is a technique of divination and fortune telling based upon the observation and interpretation of bodily marks—primarily those of the melanocytic nevus condition (i.e. moles).

Although divination by moles, birthmarks and blemishes has been practiced in many societies throughout history, it has never achieved the status of dream divination, astrology, or even palmistry. As such, it has generally been classed a species of superstition or folklore, rather than a pseudo-science.

== Classical mole divination ==
Despite a cultural predilection for physiognomy, which developed in a considerable literature, mole divination was not a major feature of Greco-Roman culture, and references to the practice are rare. Birthmarks enjoyed a somewhat higher status, and are mentioned. Seleucus I Nicator, the first Macedonian king of Syria, was said to have received from Apollo an anchor-shaped birthmark on his thigh, which was also borne by his descendants.

A short Greek manual of mole interpretation survives from antiquity, appended to the end of a much longer work on divination by twitches ascribed to the legendary Greek seer Melampus. Although the treatise on moles lacks an author, and differs in style from the work on twitches, it is customarily also referred to as by pseudo-Melampus. The text is titled Peri Elaion tou Somatos "On the Olives of the Body", the term presumably being applied to moles because of their similarity in shape and color. There are indications, however, that the text also covers birthmarks, as "fiery" red "olives" are mentioned.

In general, the work relies on fairly straightforward analogical association. A mark on the back of the throat portends beheading. One on the lips portends overeating. A mark on the nose—which the Greeks like many other cultures associated with the privates—portends the recipient will be "insatiate in lovemaking". Some distinctions are made between men and women, left and right.

A later Turkish translation of the Ps-Melampus text, ascribed to "Leo the Wise", was translated into French by Jean Nicolaides (Les Livres de Divination Traduits sur un Manuscrit Turc Inédit, 1889).
