= Nevus of Ito =

- Other names: Nevus fuscocaeruleus acromiodeltoideus
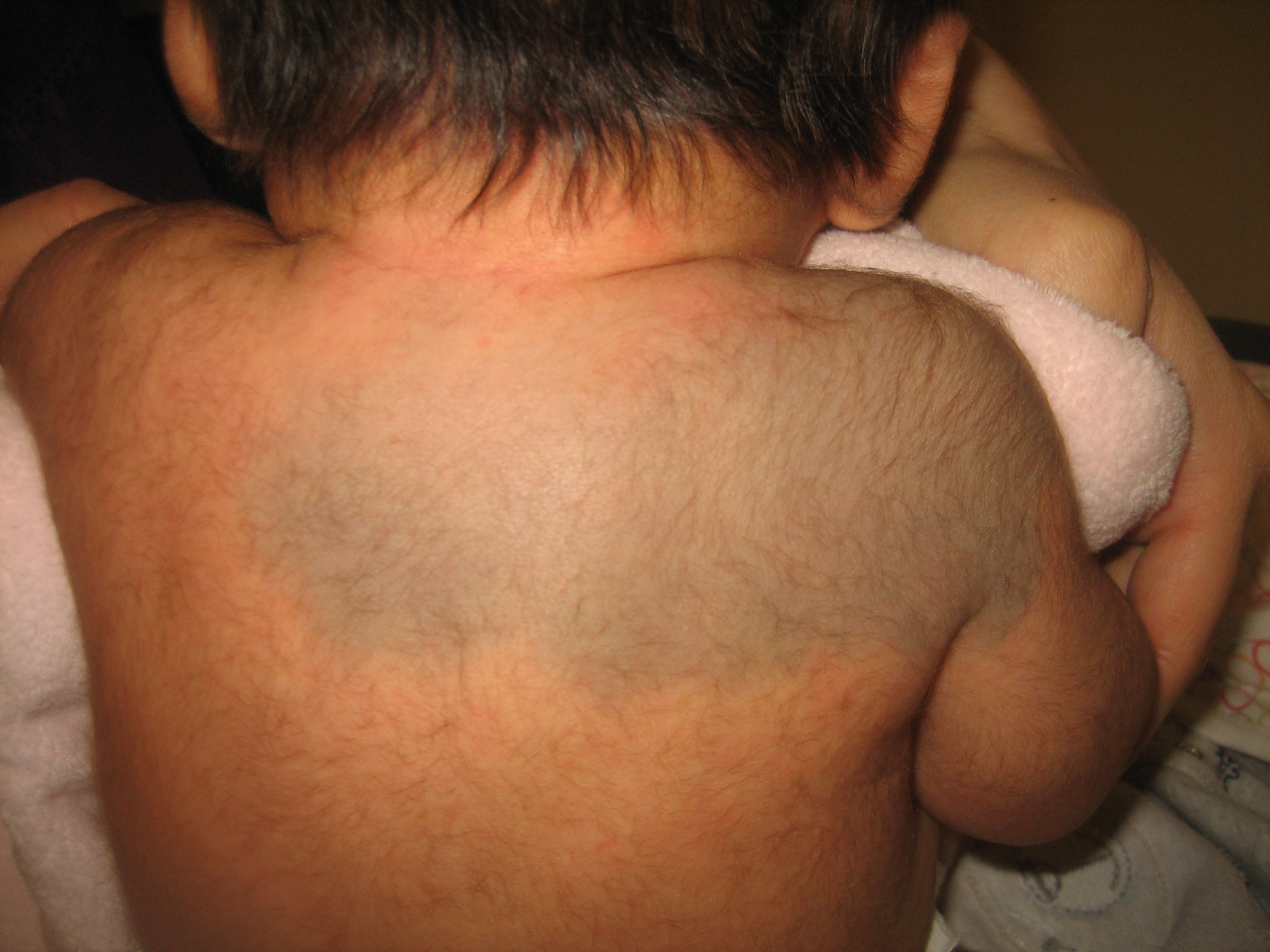
- Blue-grey segmental patch over the right posterior shoulder of a neonate
- Specialty: Oncology
- Symptoms: Similar to Nevus of Ota but occurring on shoulder and chest; blue in color

Nevus of Ito also known as nevus fuscoceruleus acromiodeltoideus is a skin condition with similar features to the Nevus of Ota, but occurring in a different distribution. It is a congenital, flat brownish lesions on the face or shoulder.

== See also ==
- Skin lesion
