= Allegorical Painting of Two Ladies, English School =

17th century painting

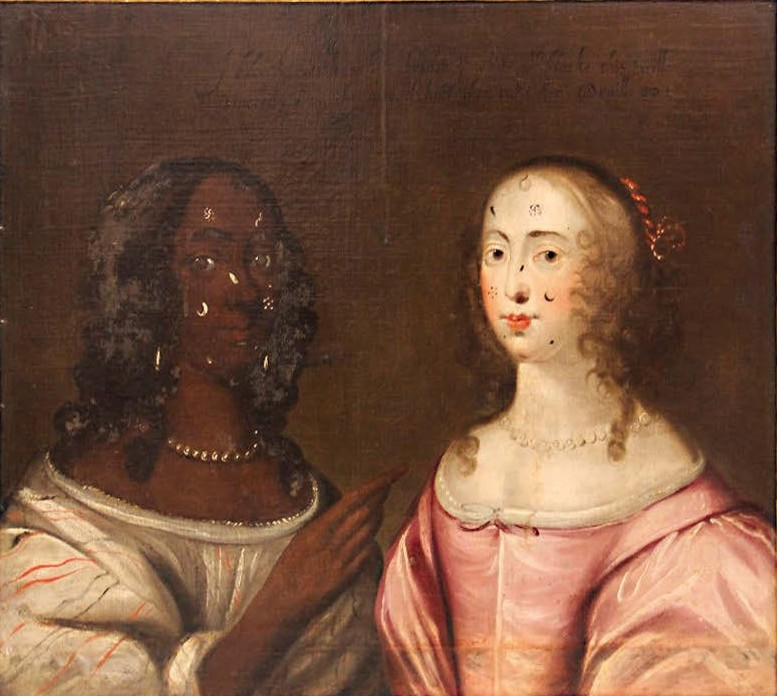
Allegorical Painting of Two Ladies (1650s)

Allegorical Painting of Two Ladies, English School is a 17th-century allegorical painting by an unknown artist, and dated from the 1650s. For its period, the painting is considered unusual in its depiction of a black woman and a white woman sitting side by side.

== Description ==
The painting depicts two women, one black and one white, sitting next to each other, with their faces covered in beauty patches. The painting is unusual for the time in its depiction of the sitters as equals. The women are presented as companions with similar dress, makeup, hair and jewellery. The work, created c. 1650, is probably not a portrait of real sitters, but an allegory with relevance within contemporaneous British print culture.

Above the women is the inscription, "I black with white bespott you white with blacke this evil proceeds from thy proud hart then take her, Devill". The writing is likely intended to be moralising, condemning the use of cosmetics and especially beauty patches, which were popular adornments at the time. In 1650, an act to forbid beauty patches was introduced to Parliament, although it was not passed.

== Provenance ==
The painting originates from the estate of Lloyd Tyrell-Kenyon, 6th Baron Kenyon (1947–2019). Kenyon was quoted as saying in 1949 that "We have a curious picture which has hung here for many years, but of which I know of no real explanation." It was in his manor house in Shropshire, England, since at least the nineteenth century.

== Export bar and acquisition ==
On 23 June 2021, the painting was sold at a small auction house in Shropshire with an estimate of £2000–4000. There was a fierce bidding war due to the inherent sociological interest of the allegorical depiction of a dark-skinned woman, and the final hammer price was £220,000, before the 20% buyer's premium. It was the highest sum ever paid for an item at the Shropshire auction house.

After its sale, the purchaser applied for an export licence. The British government subsequently barred the painting from export in the hope that a UK institution could purchase the painting within a time limit, a routine action intended to prevent overseas buyers from acquiring culturally important artworks.

The painting's export bar was set to be deferred on 9 March 2022. On 23 June 2023, The Guardian reported that the painting had been "saved" for Britain by Compton Verney Art Gallery for £300,000 with the help of grants from the National Heritage Memorial Fund and the Victoria and Albert Museum, valued at £154,600 and £50,000 respectively.
