= Nevus cell =

Type of pigment-producing skin cell

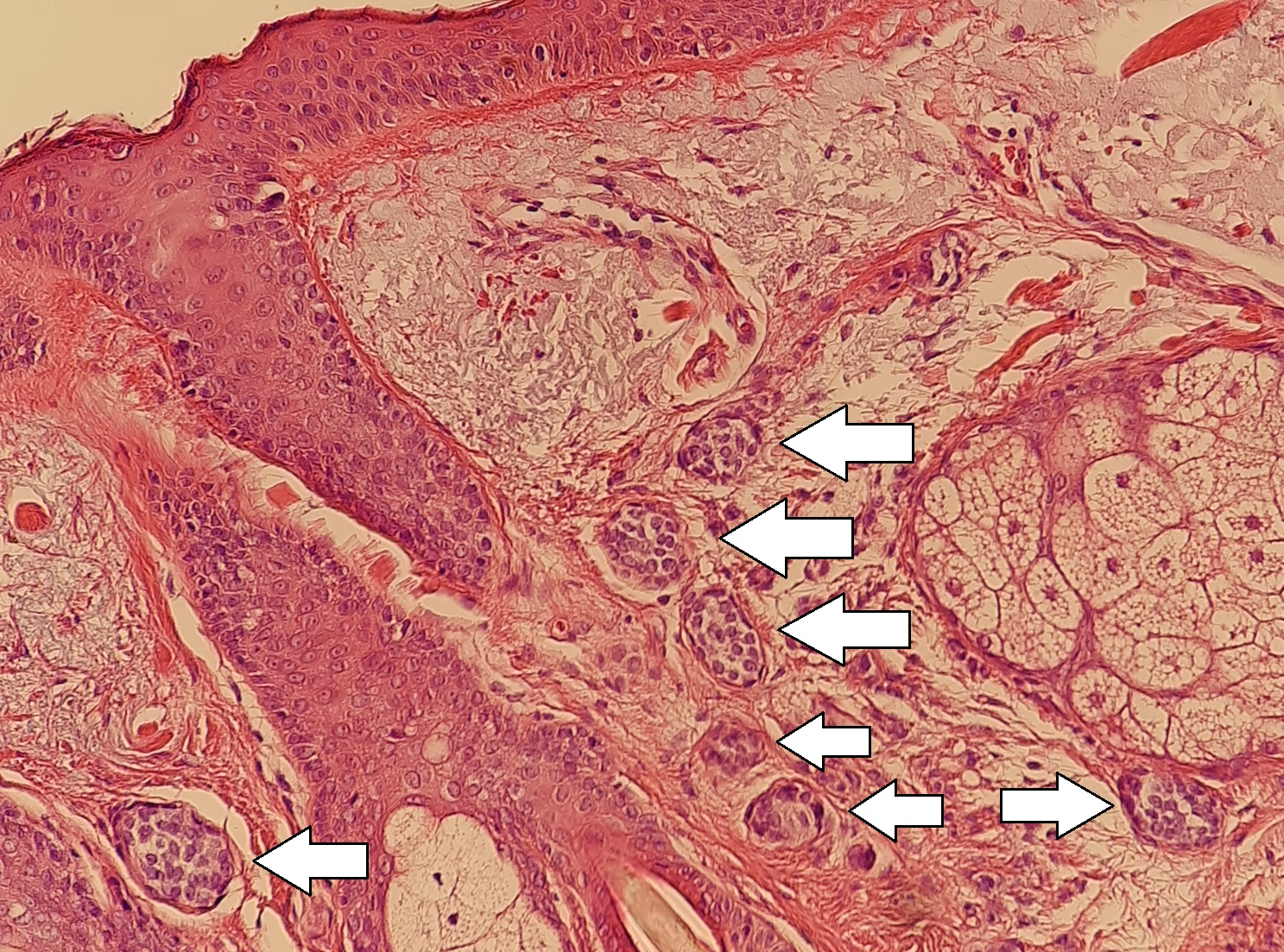
Histopathology of a dermal nevus, with nests of nevus cells (arrows).

Nevus cells are a variant of melanocytes. They are larger than typical melanocytes, do not have dendrites, and have more abundant cytoplasm with coarse granules. They are usually located at the dermoepidermal junction or in the dermis of the skin. Dermal nevus cells can be further classified: type A (epithelioid) dermal nevus cells mature into type B (lymphocytoid) dermal nevus cells which mature further into type C (neuroid) dermal nevus cells, through a process involving downwards migration.

Nevus cells are the primary component of a melanocytic nevus.

Nevus cells can also be found in lymph nodes and the thymus.

== See also ==
- List of human cell types derived from the germ layers
