= Nevus of Ota =

Human facial birthmark

- Other names: Congenital melanosis bulbi, nevus fuscoceruleus ophthalmomaxillaris, oculodermal melanocytosis, oculomucodermal melanocytosis
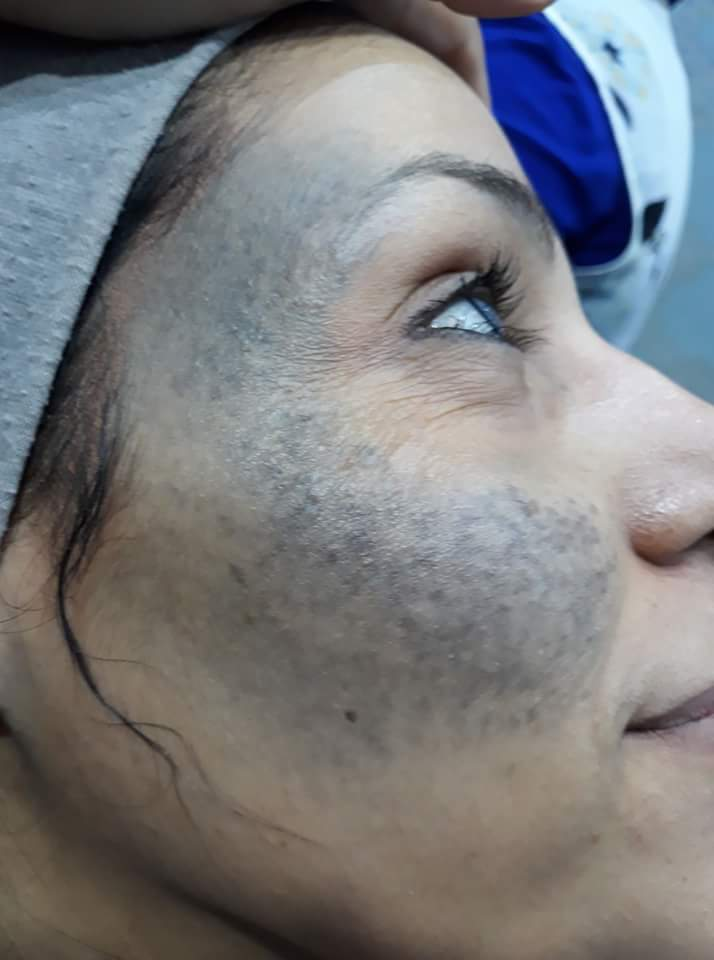
- Specialty: Oncology

Nevus of Ota is a hyperpigmentation that occurs on the face, most often appearing on the white of the eye. It also occurs on the forehead, nose, cheek, periorbital region, and temple.

It was first reported by Masao Ōta of Japan in 1939.

== Cause ==
Nevus of Ota is caused by the entrapment of melanocytes in the upper third of the dermis. It is found only on the face, most commonly unilaterally, rarely bilaterally and involves the first two branches of the trigeminal nerve. The sclera is involved in two-thirds of cases (causing an increased risk of glaucoma). It should not be confused with Mongolian spot, which is a birthmark caused by entrapment of melanocytes in the dermis but is located in the lumbosacral region. Women are nearly five times more likely to be affected than men, and it is rare among Caucasian people. Nevus of Ota may not be congenital, and may appear during puberty.

== Skin treatment ==
A Q-switched 1064 nm laser has been successfully used to treat the condition. The Q-switched lasers (694 nm ruby, 755 nm Alexandrite or 1064 nm Nd-YAG) with their high peak power and pulse width in nano second range are best suited to treat various epidermal, junctional, mixed and dermal lesions. The Q-switched 1064 nm Nd-YAG is an ideal choice to treat dermal pigment as in nevus of Ota and in darker skin types, as it reduces the risk of epidermal injury and pigmentary alterations. The pigment clearance can be expected to be near total, using multiple treatment sessions, each separated by a minimum of six weeks. The number of treatments required depends on the severity of the lesion. A darker lesion needs more treatments. The outcome also depends to some extent on the power output and quality of the laser system. Last but not least, the skill of the laser surgeon plays a role in achieving early and good clearance.

== Treatment ==
A specific form of conjunctivoplasty may help somewhat.

== Notable cases ==
- Actress Daniela Ruah of NCIS: Los Angeles, right eye
- Actor Eriq La Salle of ER, left eye
- YouTuber Evelien "Gab" Smolders, left eye

== See also ==
- Nevus of Ito
- List of cutaneous conditions
