= Cusco–Collao Quechua =

Quechua dialects of Peru

Cusco-Collao Quechua
- Qusqu-Qullaw
- Native to: Peru
- Ethnicity: Quechuas, Qullas
- Native speakers: (5 million cited 1987–2002)
- Language family: Quechuan: Quechua II; C; Cusco-Collao Quechua
- Dialects: Cuzco Quechua; Puno Quechua; South Bolivian Quechua; North Bolivian Quechua

Language codes
- ISO 639-3: –
- Glottolog: cusc1235 Cuscan Quechua boli1262 Bolivian-Argentinian Quechua

Cusco–Collao (Spanish, also Cuzco–Collao) or Qusqu–Qullaw (Quechua) is a collective term used for Quechua dialects that have aspirated (tʃʰ, pʰ, tʰ, kʰ, qʰ) and ejective (tʃʼ, pʼ, tʼ, kʼ, qʼ) plosives, apparently borrowed from Aymaran languages. They include Cusco Quechua, Puno Quechua, North Bolivian Quechua, and South Bolivian Quechua. Together with Ayacucho Quechua, which is mutually intelligible, they form the Southern Quechua language.

In 1975, the term "Cusco-Collao" was coined by the government of Juan Velasco Alvarado as the name of one of six officially recognized regional varieties of Quechua in Peru, and is still used in both Spanish and Quechua forms in publications of the Peruvian government and SIL International.

In linguistic terms, the group is problematic. Concerning vocabulary, Cusco Quechua is closest to Ayacucho Quechua, with which it has 96% lexical similarity, whereas Puno Quechua and the Bolivian Quechua varieties have borrowed more lexicon and morphology from Aymara and Spanish (e.g. the diminutive suffix -ita, -itu, -sita, -situ instead of -cha: cf. "small stone": rumisitu in Bolivia vs. rumicha in both Cusco and Ayacucho). Typical for Cusco-Collao dialects is the appearance of subordinating conjunctions, e.g. imaraykuchus (because) and sichus (if), or relative pronouns, e.g. pitachus (whom) or imachus (that, what), which are uncommon in Ayacucho Quechua and other Quechua varieties. Conjunctions like imaraykuchus are by far most common in the Bolivian dialects. Otherwise, subordination in Quechua can be expressed by means of suffixes and infixes like -pti- and -spa or (to substitute relative clauses) -q, -sqa and -na.

== See also ==
- Quechuan and Aymaran spelling shift

== Bibliography ==
- Antonio Cusihuamán (1976): Diccionario Quechua Cuzco-Collao [- Castellano y vice versa]. Ministerio de educación del Perú
- Antonio Cusihuamán (1976): Gramática Quechua Cuzco-Collao. Ministerio de educación del Perú
