= Language planning =

Deliberate effort to influence languages or their varieties within a speech community

In sociolinguistics, language planning (also known as language engineering) is a deliberate effort to influence the function, structure or acquisition of languages or language varieties within a speech community.

Robert L. Cooper (1989) defines language planning as "the activity of preparing a normative orthography, grammar, and dictionary for the guidance of writers and speakers in a non-homogeneous speech community". Along with language ideology and language practices, language planning is part of language policy – a typology drawn from Bernard Spolsky's theory of language policy. According to Spolsky, language management is a more precise term than language planning. Language management is defined as "the explicit and observable effort by someone or some group that has or claims authority over the participants in the domain to modify their practices or beliefs". However, his preferred term "language management" has not displaced the more established "language planning", such as in the journal titles Language Problems and Language Planning, Current Issues in Language Planning, and Journal of Language Planning.

Language planning is often associated with government planning, but is also used by a variety of non-governmental organizations such as grass-roots organizations as well as individuals. Goals of such planning vary. Better communication through assimilation of a single dominant language can bring economic benefits to minorities but is also perceived to facilitate their political domination. It involves the establishment of language regulators, such as formal or informal agencies, committees, societies or academies to design or develop new structures to meet contemporary needs.

== Language ideology ==
Four overarching language ideologies are proposed to explain motivations and decisions.

Internationalization
the adoption of a non-indigenous language as a means of wider communication, as an official language or in a particular domain, such as the use of English in India, Singapore, the Philippines, Papua New Guinea, and South Africa.

Linguistic assimilation
the belief that every member of a society, irrespective of their native language, should learn and use the dominant language of the society in which they live. An example is the English-only movement of some residents of the United States.

Linguistic pluralism
the recognition and support of many languages within one society. Examples include the coexistence of French, German, Italian, and Romansh in Switzerland; and the shared official status of English, Malay, Tamil, and Mandarin Chinese in Singapore. The coexistence of many languages may not necessarily arise from a conscious language ideology but rather the relative efficiency of communicating in a shared language.

Vernacularization
the restoration and development of an indigenous language, along with its adoption by the state as an official language. Examples include Hebrew in the state of Israel, Quechua in Peru and Māori in New Zealand.

== Goals ==
Eleven language planning goals have been recognized (Nahir 2003):

1. Language purification – prescription of usage norms in order to preserve the "linguistic purity" of language, protect language from foreign influences, and guard against perceived language deviation from within
2. Language revival – the attempt to restore to common use a language which has few or no surviving native speakers
3. Language reform – deliberate change in specific aspects of language or extralinguistic elements, such as grammar and orthography, in order to facilitate use
4. Language standardization – the attempt to garner prestige for a regional language or dialect, developing it as the chosen standard language of a region
5. Language spread – the attempt to increase the number of speakers of a language
6. Lexical modernization – word coining or adaptation
7. Terminology unification – development of unified terminologies, mainly in technical domains
8. Stylistic simplification – simplification of language usage in lexicon, grammar, and style. That includes changing the use of language in social and formal contexts.
9. Interlingual communication – facilitation of linguistic communication between members of distinct speech communities
10. Language maintenance – preservation of a group's native language as a first or second language where pressures threaten or cause a decline in the status of the language
11. Auxiliary-code standardization – standardization of marginal, auxiliary aspects of language, such as signs for the deaf, place names, or rules of transliteration and transcription

== Types ==
Language planning has been divided into three types:

=== Status planning ===
Status planning is the allocation or reallocation of a language or dialect to functional domains within a society, thus affecting the status, or standing, of a language.

==== Language status ====
Language status is distinct from, though intertwined with, language prestige and language function. Language status is the given position (or standing) of a language against other languages. A language garners status according to the fulfillment of four attributes, described in 1968 by two different authors, Heinz Kloss and William Stewart. Both Kloss and Stewart stipulated four qualities of a language that determine its status. Their respective frameworks differ slightly, but they emphasize four common attributes:

1. Language origin – whether a given language is indigenous or imported to the speech community
2. Degree of standardization – the extent of development of a formal set of norms that define 'correct' usage
3. Juridical status
  1. Sole official language (e.g. French in France and Turkish in Turkey)
  2. Joint official language (e.g. English and Afrikaans in South Africa; French, German, Italian and Romansh in Switzerland)
  3. Regional official language (e.g. Igbo in Nigeria; Marathi in Maharashtra, India)
  4. Promoted language – lacks official status on a national or regional level but is promoted and sometimes used by public authorities for specific functions (e.g. Spanish in New Mexico; West African Pidgin English in Cameroon)
  5. Tolerated language – neither promoted nor proscribed; acknowledged but ignored (e.g. Native American languages in the United States in the present day)
  6. Proscribed language – discouraged by official sanction or restriction (e.g. Welsh in the UK in the past, Breton, Alsatian and others in France; Elfdalian and Gutnish in Sweden; Galician, Basque and Catalan during Francisco Franco's regime in Spain; Macedonian in Greece; indigenous American languages during the boarding school era)
4. Vitality – the ratio, or percent, of users of a language to another variable, such as the total population. Kloss and Stewart both distinguish six classes of statistical distribution. However, they draw the line between classes at different percentages. According to Kloss, the highest level of vitality is demarcated by 90% or more speakers, followed by 70%, 40%, 20%, 3%, and less than 3%. According to Stewart, the six classes are determined by the following percentages of speakers: 75%, 50%, 25%, 10%, 5%, and less than 5%.

William Stewart outlines ten functional domains in language planning:

1. Official – An official language "function[s] as a legally appropriate language for all politically and culturally representative purposes on a nationwide basis." The official function of a language is often specified in a constitution.
2. Provincial – A provincial language functions as an official language for a geographic area smaller than a nation, typically a province or region (e.g. French in Quebec)
3. Wider communication – A language of wider communication (LWC) may be official or provincial, but more importantly, it functions as a medium of communication across language boundaries within a nation (e.g. Hindi in India; Swahili language in East Africa)
4. International – An international language functions as a medium of communication across national boundaries (e.g. English, formerly French as a diplomatic and international language)
5. Capital – A capital language functions as a prominent language in and around a national capital (e.g. Dutch and French in Brussels)
6. Group – A group language functions as a conventional language among the members of a single cultural or ethnic group
7. Educational – An educational language functions as a medium of instruction in primary and secondary schools on a regional or national basis (Urdu in West Pakistan and Bengali in East Pakistan)
8. School subject – A school subject language is taught as a subject in secondary school or higher education (e.g. Classical languages)
9. Literary – A literary language functions as a language for literary or scholarly purposes (Academese)
10. Religious – A religious language functions as a language for the ritual purposes of a particular religion (e.g. Liturgical Latin for the Latin Church within the Catholic Church; Arabic for the reading of the Qur'an)

Robert Cooper outlines two additional functional domains (mass media and work) and distinguishes three sub-types of official functions:

1. A statutory language is a "de jure" official language
2. A working language is used by a government for daily activities
3. A symbolic language is used as a state symbol

=== Corpus planning ===
Corpus planning refers to the prescriptive intervention in the forms of a language, whereby planning decisions are made to engineer changes in the structure of the language. Corpus planning activities often arise as the result of beliefs about the adequacy of the form of a language to serve desired functions. Unlike status planning, which is mostly undertaken by administrators and politicians, corpus planning is generally the work of individuals with greater linguistic expertise. There are three traditionally recognized types of corpus planning: graphization, standardization, and modernization.

==== Graphization ====
Graphization refers to development, selection and modification of scripts and orthographic conventions for a language. The use of writing in a speech community can have lasting sociocultural effects, which include easier transmission of material through generations, communication with greater numbers of people, and a standard against which varieties of spoken language are often compared. Linguist Charles A. Ferguson made two key observations about the results of adopting a writing system. First, the use of writing adds another form of the language to the community's repertory. Although written language is often viewed as secondary to spoken language, the vocabulary, grammatical structures and phonological structures of a language often adopt characteristics in the written form that are distinct from the spoken form. Second, the use of writing often leads to a folk belief that the written language is the 'real' language, and speech is a corruption of it. Written language is viewed as more conservative, while the spoken form is more susceptible to language change. Isolated relic areas of the spoken language may be less innovative than the written form, or the written language may have been based on a divergent variety of the spoken language.

In establishing a writing system for a language, corpus planners have the option of using an existing system or designing a new one. The Ainu of Japan chose to adopt the Japanese language's katakana syllabary as the writing system for the Ainu language. Katakana is designed for a language with a basic CV syllable structure, but Ainu contains many CVC syllables which cannot easily be adapted to this syllabary. Therefore, Ainu uses a modified katakana system, in which syllable-final codas are consonants by a subscript version of a katakana symbol that begins with the desired consonant.

An example of an original script includes the development of the Armenian script in 405 AD by St. Mesrop Mashtots. Though the script was modeled after the Greek alphabet, it distinguished Armenian from the Greek and Syriac alphabets of the neighboring peoples. Likewise, in the early 19th century, Sequoyah (Cherokee) designed an orthography for Cherokee in the Southeast of the present-day United States. It uses some Latin characters but also introduces new ones.

==== Standardization ====
The process of standardization often involves one variety of a language taking precedence over other social and regional dialects of a language. Another approach, where dialects are mutually intelligible, is to introduce a poly-phonemic written form that is intended to represent all dialects of a language adequately but with no standard spoken form. If one dialect is chosen, it comes to be perceived as supra-dialectal and the 'best' form of the language.

Choosing the standard language has important social consequences, as it benefits the speakers whose spoken and written dialect conforms closest to the chosen standard. The chosen standard is generally spoken by the most powerful social group within society, and it is imposed upon other groups as the form to emulate, making the standard norm necessary for socioeconomic mobility. In practice, standardization generally entails increasing the uniformity of the norm, as well as the codification of the norm.

By contrast, English has become standardized without any planning. The process began when William Caxton introduced the printing press in England in 1476. This was followed by the adoption of the south-east Midlands dialect, spoken in London, as the print language. Because of the dialect's use for administrative, government, business, and literary purposes, it became entrenched as the prestigious variety of English. After the development of grammars and dictionaries in the 18th century, the rise of print capitalism, industrialization, urbanization, and mass education led to the dissemination of this dialect as the cultural norm for the English language.

==== Modernization ====
Modernization occurs when a language needs to expand its resources to meet functions. Modernization often occurs when a language undergoes a shift in status, such as when a country gains independence from a colonial power or when there is a change in the language education policy. The main force in modernization is the expansion of the lexicon, which allows the language to discuss topics in modern semantic domains. Language planners generally develop new lists and glossaries to describe new technical terms, but it is also necessary to ensure that the new terms are consistently used by the appropriate sectors within society. While some languages, such as Japanese and Hungarian, have experienced rapid lexical expansion to meet the demands of modernization, other languages, such as Hindi and Arabic, have failed to do so. Such expansion is aided by the use of new terms in textbooks and professional publications. Issues of linguistic purism often play a significant role in lexical expansion, but technical vocabulary can be effective within a language, regardless of whether it comes from the language's own process of word formation or from extensive borrowing from another language. While Hungarian has almost exclusively used language-internal processes to coin new words, Japanese has borrowed extensively from English to derive new words as part of its modernization.

=== Acquisition planning ===
Acquisition planning is a type of language planning in which a national, state or local government system aims to influence aspects of language, such as language status, distribution and literacy through education. Acquisition planning can also be used by non-governmental organizations, but it is more commonly associated with government planning.

Acquisition planning is often integrated into a broader language planning process in which the statuses of languages are evaluated, corpuses are revised and the changes are finally introduced to society on a national, state or local level through education systems, ranging from primary schools to universities. This process of change can entail an alteration in student textbook formatting, a change in methods of teaching an official language, or the development of a bilingual language program, only to name a few. For example, if a government chooses to raise the status level of a certain language or change its level of prestige, it can establish a law which requires teachers to teach only in this language or that textbooks are written using only this language's script. This, in turn, would support the elevation of the language's status or could increase its prestige. In this way, acquisition planning is often used to promote language revitalization, which can change a language's status or reverse a language shift, or to promote linguistic purism. In a case where a government revises a corpus, new dictionaries and educational materials will need to be revised in schools in order to maintain effective language acquisition.

==== The education sector ====
The education ministry or education sector of government is typically in charge of making national language acquisition choices based on state and local evaluation reports. The duties of education sectors vary by country; Robert B. Kaplan and Richard B. Baldauf describe the sectors' six principal goals:

1. To choose the languages which should be taught within the curriculum.
2. To determine the amount and quality of teacher training.
3. To involve local communities.
4. To determine what materials will be used and how they will be incorporated into syllabi.
5. To establish a local and state assessment system to monitor progress.
6. To determine financial costs.

==== Problems ====
Although acquisition planning can be useful to governments, there are problems which must be considered. Even with a solid evaluation and assessment system, the effects of planning methods can never be certain; governments must consider the effects on other aspects of state planning, such as economic and political planning. Some proposed acquisition changes could also be too drastic or instituted too suddenly without proper planning and organization. Acquisition planning can also be financially draining, so adequate planning and awareness of financial resources is essential. Therefore, it is important that government goals be organized and planned carefully.

==== Multilingualism ====
There is also growing concern over the treatment of multilingualism in education, especially in many countries which were once colonized. Choosing the language of instruction which would be most beneficial to effective communication on the local and state level requires thoughtful planning, and it is surrounded by debate. Some states prefer to teach only in the official language, but some aim to foster linguistic and thus social diversity by encouraging teaching in several (native) languages. The use of a single language of instruction supports national unity and homogeneity whereas the incorporation of different languages may help students to learn better by offering alternative perspectives.

==== Non-governmental organizations ====
In addition to the education sector, there are non-governmental sectors or organizations that have a significant effect on language acquisition, such as the Académie française of France or the Real Academia Española of Spain. These organizations often write their own dictionaries and grammar books, thus affecting the materials which students are exposed to in schools. Although these organizations do not hold official power, they influence government planning decisions, such as with educational materials, affecting acquisition.

==== Ireland ====
Before the partition of Ireland, a movement began which aimed at the restoration of Irish, as the nation's primary language, based on a widespread sentiment for Irish nationalism and cultural identity. During and after colonisation, Irish had competed with English and Scots; the movement to restore the language gained momentum after the Irish War of Independence. The Gaelic League was founded to promote the acquisition of Irish in schools, thus "de-Anglicizing" Ireland. Immediately after The Irish Free State gained independence in 1922, the League declared that Irish must be the language of instruction for at least one hour in primary schools in the state. Irish-speaking teachers were recruited, and preparatory colleges were established to train new teachers.

The program implementation was mostly left to the individual schools, which did not consistently carry it out. Additionally, educating a generation is a long process, for which the League was not prepared. There was no consensus as to how the Irish language should be reinstituted; the League and schools did not develop a system assessment plan to monitor progress. Thus the movement lost strength, and the number of native Irish speakers has been in steady decline.

== Case study: Quechua in Peru ==
=== Status planning ===
Peru's history of language planning begins in the 16th century with Spanish colonization. When the Spanish first arrived in Peru, Quechua served as a language of wider communication, a lingua franca, between Spaniards and Peruvian natives. As the years passed, Spaniards asserted the superiority of the Spanish language; as a result, Spanish gained prestige, taking over as a language of wider communication and the dominant language of Peru. In 1975, under the leadership of President Juan Velasco Alvarado, the revolutionary government of Peru declared Quechua an official language of the Peruvian state, "coequal with Spanish." Four years later, the law was reversed. Peru's 1979 constitution declares Spanish the only official language of the state; Quechua and Aymara are relegated to "official use zones," equivalent to Stewart's provincial function described above. Quechua has officially remained a provincial language since 1979. Today, Quechua also serves a limited international function throughout South America in Argentina, Bolivia, Brazil, Chile, Colombia, and Ecuador; communities of Quechua speakers outside Peru enable communication in Quechua across borders. Still, because of Quechua's low status, Spanish is almost always used as the lingua franca instead. Recently, Quechua has also gained ground in the academic world, both as a school subject and a topic of literary interest.

=== Corpus planning ===
The three main types of corpus planning are all evident in the development of Quechua languages in Peru since the colonial era. Graphization has been in process since the arrival of the Spanish in the region, when the Spanish imperialists attempted to describe the exotic sounds of the language to Europeans.

When Quechua was made an official language in Peru in 1975, the introduction of the language into the education and government domains made it essential to have a standard written language. The task of adopting a writing system proved to be a point of contention among Quechua linguists. Although most agreed to use the Latin alphabet, linguists disagreed about how to represent the phonological system of Quechua, particularly in regards to the vowel system. Representatives from the Peruvian Academy of the Quechua language and the Summer Institute of Linguistics wanted to represent allophones of the vowels /i/ and /u/ with separate letters <e> and <o>, which creates an apparent five-vowel system. They argued that this makes the language easier to learn for people who are already familiar with written Spanish. However, other Quechua linguists argued that a three-vowel system was more faithful to the phonology of Quechua. After years of debate and disagreement, in 1985 Quechua linguists proposed the Pan-Quechua alphabet as an accurate representation of the language, and this was adopted in intercultural bilingual education programs and textbooks. However, the Peruvian Academy and the SIL both refused to adopt it and continued to propose new alphabets, leaving the issue unsettled. For more information, see Quechua writing system and Quechuan and Aymaran spelling shift. Another disagreement was about how to reflect the phonological differences apparent in different dialects of Quechua. For example, some distinct dialects utilize aspirated and glottalized versions of the voiceless uvular stop /q/, while others do not and some language planners found it important to reflect these dialectal differences.

The search for a unified alphabet reflects the process of standardization. Unlike other cases of standardization, in Quechua this has been applied only to the written language, not to the spoken language, and no attempt was made to change the spoken language of native speakers, which varied by regions. Rather, standardization was needed to produce a uniform writing system to provide education to Quechua speakers in their native language.

Language planners in Peru have proposed several varieties to serve as the supradialectal spoken norm. Some saw Qusqu-Qullaw as the natural choice for a standard since it is recognized as the form which is most similar to that spoken by the Incas. Others favor Ayacucho Quechua since it is more conservative, whereas Qusqu-Qullaw has been influenced by contact with the Aymara language.

Rodolfo Cerrón Palomino proposed a literary standard, Southern Quechua that combines features of both dialects. This norm has been accepted by many institutions in Peru.

Lexical modernization has also been critical to the development of Quechua. Language planners have attempted to coin new Quechua words by combining Quechua morphemes to give new meanings. Generally, loanwords are considered only when the words cannot be developed through existing Quechua structures. If loanwords are adopted, linguists may adjust them to match typical Quechua phonology.

=== Acquisition planning ===
Since Quechua is no longer an official language of Peru, Quechua literacy is not consistently encouraged in schools. Peru's education system is instead based on Spanish, the nation's official language. Despite its low prestige, Quechua is still spoken by millions of indigenous Peruvians, a great deal of whom are bilingual in Quechua and Spanish. There is a desire to preserve the uniqueness of Quechua as a language with its own attributes and representations of culture. Some argue that promoting a diverse literacy program gives students diverse perspectives on life, which could only enhance their educational experience. Before 1975, Peru had bilingual education programs, but Quechua was not taught as a subject in primary and secondary schools. After the 1975 education reform, Quechua and Spanish both had standing in bilingual programs, but only in restricted speech communities. These experimental programs were then canceled due to a change in government planning, but again reinstated in 1996. Even with national intercultural bilingual education programs, teachers at local schools and members of the community often prefer using Spanish, destabilizing support for bilingual education. This underscores the importance of community support as a goal for the education sector as mentioned earlier. Some believe that due to Spanish's higher national prestige, it is more socially and economically beneficial to learn and speak Spanish. It is debatable whether these education programs will benefit education or raise the status of Quechua.

== See also ==
- Abstand and ausbau languages
- Directorate of Language Planning and Implementation
- Language death
- Language policy
  - Inclusive language
  - Gender-neutral language
  - Political correctness
- Linguistic relativity
- Language shift
- Linguistic imperialism
- Linguistic purism
- Linguistic rights
- Interlinguistics
- Languages in censuses

== Relevant journals ==
- Current Issues in Language Planning (Routledge) Home page
- Language Policy (Springer) Home page
- Language Problems and Language Planning. Home page
