= Colla language =

The Colla or Kolla language may be either:

- The Aymara language or
- Any of several neighboring dialects of Quechua, such as South Bolivian Quechua.

== See also ==
- Kolla people
