= Academia Mayor de la Lengua Quechua =

Peruvian organization for teaching the Quechua language

High Academy of the Quechua Language
- Academia Mayor de la Lengua Quechua; Qheswa Simi Hamut'ana Kuraq Suntur; Qhichwa Simi Hamut'ana Kuraq Suntur
- Abbreviation: AMLQ
- Website: amlq.org.pe
- Formerly called: Peruvian Academy of the Quechua Language

The High Academy of the Quechua Language (Spanish: Academia Mayor de la Lengua Quechua; Quechua: Qheswa Simi Hamut'ana Kuraq Suntur/Qhichwa Simi Hamut'ana Kuraq Suntur), or AMLQ, is a Peruvian organization whose purpose is stated as the teaching, promotion, and dissemination of the Quechua language.

Although the institution has subsidiary associations in different regions of Peru and in several cities around the world, it mainly operates in the department of Cusco and uses the Cusco dialect in its publications and courses for Quechua as a second language. The institution is controversial because of its particularist linguistic ideologies and its defense of a 5-vowel alphabet for Quechua. There is no consensus about whether the organization is a private or a public institution.

The mission of the institution is to teach, promote, and disseminate the Quechua language and to stimulate the development of literature in this language. In practice, their main activity is offering courses for Quechua as a second language and organizing cultural events about Andean culture, making the AMLQ one of the major cultural organizations in Cusco. They also organize symposia called 'Quechua World Congresses' with participants coming from other departments and countries.

== History ==
The Academia de la Lengua Quechua (Sp: 'Academy of the Quechua Language') was founded on November 8, 1953, by Faustino Espinoza Navarro ("El Inca"), Santiago Astete Chocano, Father Jorge A. Lira, and Andrés Alencastre Gutiérrez (Killku Warak'a). Gutiérrez became the ALQ's first president. The institution was established with its headquarters in the city of Cusco, and its first statutes were approved in January 1954.

The institution's mission is to preserve the purity of the Quechua language, promote the development of Quechua literature, and encourage linguistic research. In practice, their main activity is offering courses for Quechua as a second language and organizing cultural events about Andean culture. As such, AMLQ is one of the major cultural organizations within Cuzco city society. They also organize symposia called "Quechua World Congresses" with participants coming from different departments and countries. The Academy previously published several magazines, including Inka Rimay, its main publication today is the dictionary Simi Taqe, first published in 1995 and reissued several times.

=== Recognition by the Peruvian state ===
On December 10, 1958, the Peruvian government under President Manuel Prado Ugarteche enacted Law No. 13059 which formally recognized the organization under the name Academia Peruana de la Lengua Quechua (Peruvian Academy of the Quechua Language).

Following the foundation of several departmental Quechua Academies during the 1980s, Law No. 25260 (enacted on June 6, 1990) mandated the establishment of a "High" (Mayor) Quechua Academy in Cusco. This new institution was intended to be composed of representatives from all Quechua academies across the country and to assume a leadership role over them. However, the provisions of this law were never regulated or implemented, and the law did not mention the APLQ by name. Consequently, there is ongoing debate regarding whether the currently-operating AMLQ is the legal entity as established by the 1990 regulations. Therefore, other regional Quechua academies, such as those in Cajamarca and Ancash, have continued to operate independently of the High Academy in Cusco. Nonetheless, the law marked the beginning of the AMLQ's transition to its modern form, culminating in the creation of its guiding statutes in 2009.

It was not until 2009 that the Ministry of Education formed a commission to define the statutes for the entity created by the 1990 law. The preamble of the ministerial resolution on this issue articulates the official legal stance of the state regarding the AMLQ:

[...] that the Major Academy of the Quechua Language was never implemented despite the fact that 19 years have passed since the Law of its creation, and that the Peruvian Academy of the Quechua Language has expired, for which reason it is not possible to comply with the requirement established in the final part of Article 7 of the aforementioned Law No. 25260, regarding the majority representation of the Peruvian Academy of the Quechua Language in the formation of the Commission that will prepare the Statute of the Major Academy of the Quechua Language [...] That, in this sense, it is necessary to designate the members of the Commission that will elaborate the Statute of the Major Academy of the Quechua Language [...]

— Ministerial Resolution N° 0283-2009-ED17

In November 2009, Juan Incaroca, the then-president of the Academy, reported that a group of former directors forcibly entered the Academy's premises and stole a significant amount of administrative documents. In 2010, four members of the Academy initiated a hunger strike lasting two weeks as a protest against the lack of budget and the absence of regulation of their statutes, which they also claimed were outdated. The strike concluded with the Ministry of Education promising to allocate a budget for the Academy; however, these efforts ultimately did not materialize.

In 2016, an arbitration commission of Indecopi determined that the existing AMLQ was not, in fact, the public entity as defined by current regulations:

From the aforementioned information, it can be noticed that the institution that uses the name of the Academia Mayor de la Lengua Quechua, does not have a statute approved by the Ministry of Culture; since it only has an internal statute where the designation as president of the board of directors of the accused is stated, as observed in the inspection report of May 14, 2015. Likewise, it is noted that the law of creation of the Academia Mayor de la Lengua Quechua is not in accordance with the current regulations in force. It follows that said institution de facto develops activities without having authorization from the Ministry of Culture; as well as it lacks existence, due to the fact that it does not have legal status in force, therefore, the Commission agrees to specify that the accused insofar as he directs said establishment and uses the denomination of Academia Mayor de la Lengua Quechua, through two signs, with the purpose of attracting users, becomes a beneficiary of the publicity disseminated. Consequently, the accused has the quality of advertiser, with responsibility for the alleged infringement.

— COMISION DE LA OFICINA REGIONAL DEL INDECOPI DE CUSCO Resolución N° 226 -2016/INDECOPI-CUS

During the 2018-2019 annual session, the Committee on Culture and Cultural Heritage of the Peruvian Congress reviewed a bill that proposed, among other measures, the "institutionalization of the Academy of the Quechua Language." Ultimately, the bill was not approved.

In practice, the AMLQ has been managed as a private association. In 2023, during the celebrations marking the 70th anniversary since the founding of the original Academia de la Lengua Quechua, then-president Fernando Hermoza stated that the institution is self-financed, clarifying that it does not receive any budget from the Peruvian state."Audicion Radial por los 70 Anos de la Academia Mayor de la Lengua Quechua.", Facebook, October 17, 2024 At those same celebrations, the foundation stone for the construction of the organization's new building was laid.

Tim Marr has characterized the management and functioning of the AMLQ as occurring "neither with the State nor with the social bases." Although the institution's official portal includes a section about it, its current statute is not publicly available. Additionally, the list of "full members" is not public, although it is known that new members are elected by the current academy members, who are predominantly professionals from Cusco. As of December 2023, the board of directors included Fernando Hermoza, David Quispe Orosco, Miguel Sánchez Andia, Julia Qquenaya Apaza, and Ronal Cjuyro Mescco.

The modern AMLQ operates independently of the Peruvian state, although it considers itself an integral part of it. This affiliation is declared on its official website:

The Academia Mayor de la Lengua Quechua, is a Decentralized Public Organization of the Education Sector, with legal status of internal public law; with administrative, academic, economic and regulatory autonomy. It is headquartered in the city of Cusco (QOSQO). It was founded as the Peruvian Academy of the Quechua Language by Law No. 13059 of November 8, 1953 and promoted to the rank of ACADEMIA MAYOR DE LA LENGUA QUECHUA by Law No. 25260 of June 19, 1990.

— AMLQ, Portal institucional

=== Quechua World Congresses ===
The Third World Congress of Quechua, Yuyayyaku Wawakuna, was held in Salta in October 2004. Key conclusions included tasks for the Academy and its affiliates, such as promoting "the original phonetics and phonology" of Quechua plant names, animal names, personal names, and place names, and coordinating efforts with political and tourism authorities. Recommendations also included encouraging affiliates to distribute language-related publications so that the institution could archive all works as part of its heritage. Additionally, the Congress advocated for the Academy to adopt an organizational structure reflecting Andean cultural principles, rather than models used by foreign academies, to establish its own unique structure.

In November 2010, the VI World Congress of Quechua, titled Pachakutip K'anchaynin ("New times of prosperity and change are shining on us"), was held in Cochabamba, Bolivia.

=== Impact on local and regional legislation ===
The AMLQ has influenced various local and regional regulations, often receiving support from Cuzco authorities who viewed its five-vowel system as a regionalist stance. Consequently, the 1991 law establishing the Inka Region made official the AMLQ's Quechua alphabet. Similarly, its widely criticized official dictionary was sponsored by the Provincial Municipality in 1995 and by the Regional Government in 2005.

On November 4, 2003, in recognition of the 50th anniversary of the founding of the AMLQ, the Regional Council of Cusco enacted Regional Ordinance No. 011-2003-CRC/GRC, which declares November 8 of each year as the "Day of the Quechua Language" or "Runasimi Inca" in the department of Cusco. The ordinance also mandates the teaching of the Quechua language at all levels of "primary, secondary, and non-university higher education," especially in predominantly Quechua-speaking areas of the Cusco department. It also assigns the regulation of the Regional Ordinance to the Academia Mayor de la Lengua Quechua.

In 2016, the Regional Government of Cusco issued an ordinance declaring Cusco Quechua as a "complete and pentavocal [five vowel]" language and again mandating its teaching in the region. Although the ordinance does not mention the Academia Mayor de la Lengua Quechua (AMLQ), it reflects the institution's preference for the Cusco dialect and the controversial five-vowel orthography. The ordinance cited a technical report from the Department of Linguistics at the National University San Antonio Abad of Cusco in support of the law; however, when educational authorities requested this report from the regional government, it was unable to provide a copy. In 2019, after requesting a new report from the same university -- which was delivered on November 8, 2021 -- the educational authorities decided not to implement the pentavocalism mandated by the ordinance.

== Linguistic policies and controversy ==
=== Ideology and linguistic policies ===
The AMLQ's documents and curriculum favor the Cusco dialect of Quechua. They often use honorific terms in both Quechua and Spanish to refer to the dialect, including: Inka Rimay (Qu: 'language of the Inca'), Quechua Inka/ Runasimi Inka (Sp: 'Inca Quechua'), Quechua Imperial (Sp: 'Imperial Quechua'), Qhapaq simi (Qu: 'the great language'), Qhapaq Runasimi (Qu: 'the great Quechua'), Qosqo simi (Qu: 'language of Cuzco') or Misk'i Simi (Qu: 'the sweet language'). From its inception, the AMLQ has maintained that Cusco Quechua is the "purest" form of Quechua and is the variety that should be taught in Quechua language schools. The AMLQ's official website presents its dictionary of Cusco Quechua as the "official dictionary of the Quechua language." They reject the Runa Simi that was more commonly spoken in everyday life, and instead state that these regional varieties should be taught in specialized schools known as Yachay Wasi. The organization has also opposed the use of the macro-dialectal category "Southern Quechua" in Peruvian state policies, such as in the development of intercultural bilingual education materials.

On May 27, 1975, the Peruvian government under President Juan Velasco Alvarado made Quechua an official language of Peru. The law establishing its official status prescribed a phonological alphabet that retained five vowel characters from Spanish. In 1983, professional Quechua and Aymara experts from all over Peru decided to implement a standardized orthography with just three vowels, under phonemic considerations: a for /a/, i for /ɪ/, and u for /ʊ/. This decision was controversial, with factions of linguists, teachers, and activists both in support and opposition. The AMLQ did not approve of the shift, and continues to use the five-vowel system from the 1976 version of the official alphabet. According to the AMLQ, Presidential Resolution No. 1 of October 12, 1990, "ratifies the 1975 Basic Alphabet of Imperial Quechua," which consists of 31 graphemes: five vowels and 26 consonants for the Qosqo-Puno region. Many AMLQ members and alumni have equated writing with three vowel letters as using a non-Cuzco variety of Quechua (usually labeled as "Chanka" or "ayacuchano").

=== Criticism ===
The AMLQ has been criticized for its attitude of linguistic purism. Critics argue that the AMLQ's attempts to promote contemporary Cusco Quechua as the official standard for the Quechua language will diminish the diversity of Quechua dialects and languages. Critics argue that this approach overlooks the distinct dialectal features present in other Quechua-speaking regions.

Several AMLQ members have been criticized for expressing views that Cusco Quechua is superior to and more legitimate than other Quechua dialects, or even other languages. For example:

The Qheswa Simi of Qosqo [Quechua Language of Cusco] is the mother language, which is why the headquarters of the Academia Mayor de la Lengua Quechua en America is located in that city.

— AMLQ, Diccionario oficial Simi Taqe

The qheswa simi or runa simi [...]. This language is metropolitan. Its birth and flourishing took place in Qosqo; that is why we say Imperial Quechua. It is the mother tongue [sic] or general language from which the dialectal and subdialectal Quechua languages have come, such as Ancash-Huaylas, Ayacucho-Chanca, Cajamarca-Cañaris, Collao, Huanca-Junín, San Martín, etc., as well as those of Argentina, Chile, Bolivia, Ecuador, Colombia, Brazil. At the present time it is spoken just as it was spoken, with sweetness and integration, with slight modifications, so natural and necessary in diachronic linguistics; but its greater purity and diction are preserved. It is one of the most expressive and accurate in the world; it is the heritage of a culture not surpassed by any other.

— Juan Antonio Manya A., expresidente de la AMLQ

...the most evolved, most scientific Quechua that does not have exceptions in its writing is Inca Quechua. The Inca Quechua that has been spread from Cuzco to the majority of the communities of Tawantinsuyu.

— E. Roque, member of the AMLQ

To speak of Quechua is to speak of a scientific language, an academic language, a technical language. To speak of Quechua is not only a medium of communication, in Quechua itself is its technology, its science, its philosophy, its mathematics, a whole set of human knowledge. [...] it is much more profound than the Spanish understanding, than the English understanding, than the German understanding, than the Japanese understanding [...]

— E. Mamani, member of the AMLQ

Critics have suggested that the AMLQ's discourse and policies are biased and aim to elevate the Quechua sociolect of urban bilingual mestizos in Cusco (often referred to by the glotonym "Qhapaq Simi") while relegating rural Cusco Quechua to a secondary status. Such attitudes may have roots in Inca Garcilaso's conception of Cuzco as the imperial capital and Cuzco Quechua as courtier tongue, giving it a higher status than other dialects. According to Tim Marr, the extensive setbacks over time have been result of Andean fascism.

Specialists in the field have argued that the AMLQ's linguistic ideology is outdated and many of their views have been disproven by more recent linguistic and historical evidence. For example, although the AMLQ supports a five-vowel orthography for Quechua, most linguists describe this position as an outdated view, lacking technical rigor and not aligning with modern phonological theory. Similarly, the AMLQ has faced criticism for its position that the Quechua language originated in the Cusco area and spread from there, such that all other Quechua dialects derived from Cusco Quechua (a view espoused by the AMLQ in the 1980s, by David Samanez Flórez in the 1990s and 2000s, and as recently as 2020 by then-president Juana Rodríguez Torres). Linguists Parker and Torero published studies in the 1960s that suggested that Quechua originated in the Central Sierra of Peru, and the mainstream linguistic community considers the AMLQ's views on the language's origin outdated.

Additionally, several Quechua scholars have highlighted multiple orthographic, methodological, and eytmological inconsistencies and errors within the DAMLQ, the AMLQ's official Quechua dictionary. The main problems noted, however, are the DAMLQ's claim of pan-Quechua value, while information about non-Cuzco Quechua varieties is actually poor and ancillary, and the systematic erasure of Quechua words of Spanish origin, as a result of linguistic purism. Jara Luna César states: "The DAMLQ (1995) is neither a serious work nor a reference tool. [...] Judging by its shortcomings, the work does not contribute to the achievement of the autonomy of the language learner, so it is not a thinking tool for encoding or decoding.

In 2006, a group of people linked to the institution vandalized a Wikipedia page about Southern Quechua, insulting its editors and defacing its title page. As a result, the main page became one of the few Wikipedia pages about endangered languages that required protection.

== See also ==
- Cuzco

== Publicacions ==
- AMLQ (Academia Mayor de la Lengua Quechua) y Municipalidad del Qosqo (1995): Diccionario Quechua-Español-Quechua/Qheswa-Español-Qheswa Simi Taqe. Cusco. Online version (pdf 7,68 MB).
