= Quh =

quh may refer to:

- <quh>, a trigraph in Scots
- South Bolivian Quechua, spoken in Argentina and Bolivia (ISO 636-3:quh)
