= Demetrio Túpac Yupanqui =

Demetrio Túpac Yupanqui Martínez
- Born: Limitryu Tupaq Yupanki; 22 December 1923; Cusco, Peru
- Died: 3 May 2018 (aged 94); Lima, Peru
- Education: National University of San Marcos; Pontifical Catholic University of Peru
- Known for: Translate Don Quijote to Quechua
- Scientific career
- Fields: Quechua language

Limitryu Tupaq Yupanki (Spanish: Demetrio Túpac Yupanqui Martínez) (22 December 1923 – 3 May 2018) was a Peruvian Quechua language professor (or more accurate Southern Quechua), a translator from Castilian to Quechua and journalist.

He went to Lima, where he studied Philosophy at the Pontifical Catholic University of Peru, and then Law at the National University of San Marcos. He worked in the newspaper La Prensa, and began teaching Quechua. Subsequently, he opened his own academy, Yachay Wasi. He also taught in the United States.

In November 2005, thanks to his work, the Quechua translation of the Spanish classic Don Quixote de la Mancha was finally published with the name Yachay sapa wiraqucha dun Qvixote Manchamantan

In 2008, his work The Quechua Course was translated into Russian by A. Skromnitsky.

He died on 3 May 2018.
