= Puno Quechua =

Dialect of the Southern Quechua language

- Quechua Collao
- Native to: Peru
- Native speakers: 500,000 (2002); 100,000 monolinguals (2002)
- Language family: Quechuan: Quechua II; Southern Quechua; Puno Quechua

Language codes
- ISO 639-3: qxp
- Glottolog: puno1238

Puno Quechua, also known as Quechua Collao (Qullaw), is a dialect of the Southern Quechua language, spoken in southern Peru near Bolivia.

== See also ==
- Quechuan and Aymaran spelling shift
