= South Bolivian Quechua =

Dialect of Southern Quechua

- Uralan Buliwya runasimi
- Native to: Bolivia; a few in Argentina, Chile
- Ethnicity: Quechuas, Kolla
- Native speakers: 2,785,120
- Language family: Quechuan: Quechua II; Southern Quechua; South Bolivian Quechua

Official status
- Official language in: Bolivia

Language codes
- ISO 639-3: quh
- Glottolog: sout2991
- ELP: Bolivian Quechua
- The four branches of Quechua. South Bolivian Quechua is a dialect of Southern Quechua (II-C).

South Bolivian Quechua, also known as Central Bolivian Quechua, is a dialect of Southern Quechua spoken in Bolivia and adjacent areas of Argentina, where it is also known as Colla. It is not to be confused with North Bolivian Quechua, which is spoken on the northern Andean slopes of Bolivia and is phonologically distinct from the South Bolivian variety. Estimates of the number of speakers of South Bolivian Quechua range from 2.3 to 2.8 million, making it the most spoken indigenous language in Bolivia, just slightly greater than Aymara, with roughly 2 million speakers in Bolivia. In comparison, the North Bolivian dialect has roughly 116,000 speakers.

== Classification and dialects ==
South Bolivian Quechua is a member of the Southern branch of the Quechuan languages, making it closely related to other Southern Quechua dialects including Ayacucho and particularly the Cuzco Quechua language, varieties which are both spoken in Peru.

The Quechua language family spans an extremely diverse set of languages, many of which are mutually unintelligible, which is why linguists have classified Quechua as a language family as opposed to one language with many dialects. Though it is believed that all Quechuan languages descended from a single ancestor, Proto-Quechua, there is still debate on how the modern Quechuan languages evolved into their current states, and what this timeline would look like. As a result of this, there have been numerous suggested classifications and theories of the relatedness of specific languages and dialects of Quechua. However, the current broad division of Quechua into four main branches is generally accepted.

There are some dialectal differences in South Bolivian Quechua across the regions of Bolivia. These dialects include Chuquisaca, Cochabamba, Oruro, Potosi, and Sucre in Bolivia, along with Northwest Jujuy in Argentina. There are perhaps still a few speakers, out of 8,000 ethnic Quechua, in Chile. Santiagueño Quechua in Argentina, though divergent, appears to derive at least partly from South Bolivian Quechua.

== Language status ==
Quechua is recognized as an official language of Bolivia, one of the 36 indigenous languages declared official in the nation's constitution. South Bolivian Quechua has a large number of speakers compared to other indigenous languages. However, Quechua is still in danger of devaluing and encroachment from the prestige language Spanish. In addition, the linguistic, ideological, and cultural differences among its many dialects make it difficult for policymakers to approach Quechua as a whole, as each Quechua community provides different challenges in regard to language policy and planning.

The Ethnologue lists South Bolivian Quechua as "developing", which indicates that "the language is in vigorous use, with literature in a standardized form being used by some though this is not yet widespread or sustainable." However, UNESCO's Atlas of Endangered Languages categorizes South Bolivian Quechua as "vulnerable", defined as the following: "Most but not all children or families of a particular community speak the language as their first language, but it may be restricted to specific social domains (such as at home, where children interact with their parents and grandparents)."

Over the past few decades, there has been a surge in revitalization efforts for Quechua and other indigenous languages due to factors such as a growth in international tourism promoting cultural pride. Efforts have been made to increase the linguistic and cultural status of the Quechua language and peoples. In Bolivia, many policymakers are advocating the teaching of Quechua and other indigenous languages like Aymara in all public schools and government offices. However, these revitalization efforts are often met with resistance, and their effectiveness in halting Quechua's decline is still questionable.

== Phonology ==
=== Vowels ===
	Front	Back
Close	i	u
Open	a	

South Bolivian Quechua has three basic vowel sounds: unrounded front vowel /i/, rounded back vowel /u/, and low central vowel /a/. The front vowel /i/ is lowered to [e] or [ɛ] when next to a uvular stop or when separated from a uvular stop only by a non-stop consonant. The back vowel /u/ is similarly lowered in this environment, to [o] or [ɔ].

=== Consonants ===
The following table displays the consonant sounds in South Bolivian Quechua using the orthographic system employed by Bills (1969). IPA equivalents are included in brackets where necessary.

		Bilabial	Dental (Note: Crapo and Bills refer to this category as "dental", but it is unclear whether they specifically mean dental as opposed to alveolar. Adelaar, in discussing the Quechua language family as a whole, categorizes these consonants as alveolar.)	Postalv./ Palatal	Velar	Uvular	Glottal
Nasal		m	n	ɲ ⟨ñ⟩	(ŋ)	(ɴ)	
Plosive/ Affricate	tenuis	p	t	tʃ ⟨ch⟩	k	q	
Plosive/ Affricate	aspirated	pʰ ⟨p"⟩	tʰ ⟨t"⟩	tʃʰ ⟨ch"⟩	kʰ ⟨k"⟩	qʰ ⟨q"⟩	
Plosive/ Affricate	ejective	pʼ	tʼ	tʃʼ ⟨chʼ⟩	kʼ	qʼ	
Fricative			s		(x)	(χ)	h
Approximant	median			j ⟨y⟩	w	(ʁ)	
Approximant	lateral		l	ʎ ⟨ll⟩			
Tap			ɾ ⟨r⟩				

There are four stops and one affricate /ch/ in the basic sound system. The five sounds contrast with both their aspirated and glottalized versions, a characteristic that occurs in many dialects of the Quechua language family and is believed to be as a result of exposure to Aymara, which makes the same distinctions. Aspiration and glottalization can be seen to be contrastive in minimal pairs such as puñun "he sleeps" versus p'uñun "his jug", and piña "pineapple" versus p"iña "wild".

All stops, affricates, and fricatives are voiceless with the exception of /q/, which becomes a voiced uvular fricative [ʁ] syllable-initially.

Additional phonological alternations include fricativization of /k/ and /q/ syllable-finally, to velar [x] and uvular [χ] respectively. The fricative /s/ has allophones [s] and [ʃ], of which the latter occurs quite infrequently. (Note: Crapo writes these allophones as two separate phonemes.) All fricatives occur only word-initially and medially, never finally.

The three nasal sounds assimilate to the point of articulation of the following consonant sound. Word-finally, /n/ is the only nasal that occurs; it becomes [ŋ].

=== Syllable structure ===
South Bolivian Quechua generally has a simple CV(C) syllable structure, where the coda consonant is optional. The onset consonant is also optional word-initially, as in the words ima "what" and uk "one", and Spanish borrowings can contain word-initial consonant clusters of the form CCV(C), as in bwenos diyas "good morning". No more than two consonants are allowed in a consonant cluster.

Proto-Quechua has few constraints on the combinations of consonant clusters allowed, but due to consonant lenition syllable-finally, there are greater restrictions on the types of consonant clusters that occur in South Bolivian Quechua. Some of the possible consonant clusters can be seen in the following examples:

- čilwi "chick, baby chicken"
- p'isqu "bird"
- qan munanki "you want it"
- kayqa "this"
- waliqlla rirquy "may you go well"

=== Stress ===
Primary stress generally occurs on the penultimate syllable of the word, with secondary stresses on alternating syllables. This can be seen in the following analyses for the words munankičis and munankičisñaču (root verb muna "want, desire"), where stress has been numbered below:

mu	nan	ki	čis
2		1	

mu	nan	ki	čis	ña	ču
2		3		1	

Rare exceptions exist where the final syllable of the word carries the primary stress, such as in ari "yes". There also exist some 'emotive' suffixes in the language that are always stressed, resulting in stress on the last syllable of the word. Stress on the final syllable can also occur through the dropping of some single-syllable suffixes (for instance, the yes/no question marker -chu) without a subsequent shifting of the stress.

== Morphology ==
South Bolivian Quechua is an agglutinative, polysynthetic language with a rich derivational morphology, allowing the language to convey a large amount of information in a single word. As a result of this, words in South Bolivian Quechua can be very long.

Words in the language are purely suffixal; no other types of affixes are used. These suffixes are also highly regular, with alternations generally only occurring to maintain syllable structure.

Morphemes within a word are ordered as follows:

- root + derivational suffixes + inflectional suffixes + clitics

=== Derivational morphology ===
South Bolivian Quechua has many clearly derivational suffixes, where a noun, verb, or adjective is derived from a different lexical category. The following are a few examples:

Note: -y is the verb infinitive marker.

- -cha (factive): wasi "house", wasi-cha-y "to build a house"
- -naya (desiderative): aycha "meat", aycha-naya-y "to feel like eating some meat"
- -ya (autotransformative): wira "fat", wira-ya-y "to get fat, put on weight"
- -na (obligative): tiya "sit", tiya-na "seat, chair"
- -yuq (possessive): wasi "house", wasi-yuq "householder"
- -li (adjective formative from verb): mancha "fear", mancha-li "cowardly, fearful"

Other suffixes are less clearly categorized as derivational or inflectional, including some aspectual suffixes as well as a class of suffixes termed “auxiliary”. For example, the causative suffix ‘’-chi’’ may seem straightforwardly inflectional in some instances:

- mik"u-chi- "make (someone) eat"
- puri-chi- "make (someone) walk"
- paka-chi- "cause (someone) to hide"

But in other cases it can be derivational:

- runa wañu-chi "man killer, murderer"
- puma wañu-chi "puma hunter"
- wasi saya-chi "house builder, carpenter"

=== Inflectional morphology ===
==== Verbs ====
There are several categories of verbal suffixes in South Bolivian Quechua. These include modal suffixes, object markers, tense and aspect markers, and person markers.

South Bolivian Quechua has a great amount of modal suffixes that are used to express a range of concepts. Some examples include:

- -ra "un-, undo"; wata-ra- "unknot, untie"
- -naya "intend to, about to, do as if to"; willa-naya- "act as if to tell"
- -ysi "help someone"; mik”u-ysi-y "help him eat"
- -na "have to, be able to" (obligative); willa-na- "have to tell"
- -pu "for someone else" (benefactive); qu-pu-y "give it to him"

Some of these modal suffixes can be derivational if used with a non-verb—for example, -naya and -na.

Person markers differentiate between first, second, and third persons and plurality, as well as an inclusive and exclusive first person plural. Object markers and subject markers are used in the language, and object markers appear before subject markers. The object marker is -wa for a first person object and -su for a second person object. The following table details possible combinations of object and subject markers. Some person categories lack a subject and/or object marker.

				Object					
				1st person			2nd person		3rd person
				singular	plural		singular	plural	3rd person
				singular	exclusive	inclusive	singular	plural	3rd person
Subject	1st person	singular					-su...-yki	...-ykichiq	...-ni
Subject	1st person	plural	exclusive				-su...-yku	...-ykichiq	...-yku
Subject	1st person	plural	inclusive						...-nchiq
Subject	2nd person	singular		-wa...-nki	-wa...-yku				...-nki
Subject	2nd person	plural		-wa...-nkichiq	-wa...-yku				...-nkichiq
Subject	3rd person	singular		-wa...-n	-wa...-yku	-wa...-nchiq	-su...-nki	-su...-nkichiq	...-n
Subject	3rd person	plural		-wa...-nku	-wa...-yku	-wa...-nchiq	-su...-nku	-su...-nkichiq	...-nku

All non-present tenses in the indicative are marked by a suffix directly preceding the person marking. The present subjunctive is marked with a suffix following the person marking. Examples of tense markers include the simple past suffix -rqa, past imperfect -yka, and past perfect -sqa. Tense suffixes can change form depending on person and can alter person marking in some cases: for instance, in the past imperfect tense, both the third person singular and plural subject markers (typically -n, -nchiq, or -nku depending on object) become -q, meaning that a verb in the past imperfect with a third person subject would end in -yka-q.

==== Nouns ====
Apart from case-marking suffixes, nouns in South Bolivian Quechua can also be pluralized with the suffix -kuna (or by a numeral modifier preceding the noun). However, most speakers use the suffix -s, borrowed from Spanish, when the noun ends in a vowel. For example, wasi ("house") becomes wasis ("houses") or runa ("person") becomes runas ("people/persons"). The Quechua suffix -kuna is usually only used when a noun ends in a consonant, such as with yan (road), which becomes yankuna (roads). A collective marker, -ntin, also exists to denote “togetherness”, as in alqu michi-ntin "the dog, together with the cat". Possessiveness is marked by a suffix attached to the noun, with the form that the morpheme takes dependent on person, plurality, and whether it is following a vowel or consonant.

==== Other lexical categories ====
Pronouns in the language have no person markers, but do have plural markers that vary by person. Possessive pronouns are marked by the addition of the appropriate genitive suffix.

Adjectives can be made into superlatives with the suffix -puni, as in kosa "good"; kosa-puni "good above all others, best".

==== Independent suffixes ====
Some suffixes in South Bolivian Quechua can be used with words of any lexical category, and are generally found at the end of the word after all other suffixes. Some examples are:

- -ri "please, nicely, with delight" (polite)
- -pis "even though, even if, and, also" (additive)
- -chu "is it so?" (non-factual, question marker)
- -chus "if, maybe" (dubitative)

=== Reduplication ===
Reduplication is used extensively for various purposes, and can be derivational:

- llañuy "thin"; llañuy llañuy "very thin"
- wasi "house"; wasi wasi "settlement, collection of houses"
- rumi "stone"; rumi rumi "rocky"

Reduplicated stems can be suffixal as well:

- taq "sound of hammer blow"; taq-taq-ya-y "to hit with a hammer"

== Syntax ==
=== Word order ===
The basic word order of South Bolivian Quechua is stated to be SOV. However, because nouns are marked for case, word order is in fact very flexible and is generally varied for the purposes of emphasis. For instance, the following sentences all mean "Atahuallpa had Huascar killed":

- Atawallpa sipi-chi-rqa Waskar-ta.
- Atawallpa Waskar-ta sipi-chi-rqa.
- Waskara-ta Atawallpa sipi-chi-rqa.
- Waskar-ta sipi-chi-rqa Atawallpa.

One aspect of word order that is constant in the language is the fact that noun modifiers must directly precede the noun (adjective-noun).

=== Case marking ===
South Bolivian Quechua is nominative–accusative. Nouns can have the following case markers:

- Genitive -q/-qpa/-qpata
- Accusative -ta
- Dative -man
- Ablative -manta
- Locative -pi
- Purposive -paq
- Causal -rayku
- Instrumental -wan
- Comitative -tawan
- Allative -kama

Lack of a case marker indicates the nominative.

=== Passives ===
Passives are marked by suffixes, including -sqa on the verb, -manta "from, by" on the agent, and -wan "with" on the instrument, as in the following examples:

- Chay runa alqu-manta k"ani-sqa "That man was bitten by the dog"
- Runa rumi-wan maqa-sqa "The man was hit with a rock"

=== Subordination ===
Subordination is mostly indicated by participles, and can be marked for tense only relative to the main verb. Subordination need not be explicitly marked, as certain participles can be understood as subordinative—for example, a literal gloss of His coming, I will leave can be interpreted as When he comes, I will leave or If he comes, I will leave. Other suffixes such as -qti "when" and -rayku "because" can also be used to mark a subordinate clause.

In addition, subordination can also be indicated lexically by ukta...chaymanta... "first...then..." or ukta...q"ipanta... "first...afterwards...", as in the following examples:

- Ukta q"awa-wa-n, chaymanta chaski-n "First he saw me, then he ran"
- Ukta q"awa-wa-spa, q"ipanta pay chaski-n "First seeing me, afterwards he ran" ("After seeing me, he ran")
