= Cusco Quechua =

Southern Quechua dialect of Cusco, Peru

- Qusqu runasimi
- Native to: Peru
- Native speakers: (c. 1.5 million cited 1989–2002)
- Language family: Quechuan: Quechua II; Southern Quechua; Cusco Quechua

Language codes
- ISO 639-3: Either: quz – Cusco qve – Eastern Apurímac
- Glottolog: cusc1236 Cusco east2551 Eastern Apurímac
- ELP: Cuzco Quechua
- Quechua of Cusco is classified as Vulnerable by the UNESCO Atlas of the World's Languages in Danger.

Cusco Quechua (Quechua: Qusqu qhichwa simi) is a dialect of Southern Quechua spoken in Cusco and the Department of Cusco of Peru.

It is the Quechua variety used by the Academia Mayor de la Lengua Quechua in Cusco, which also prefers the Spanish-based five-vowel alphabet. On the other hand, the official alphabet used by the ministry of education has only three vowels.

== Phonology ==
=== Vowels ===
Quechua only has three vowel phonemes: /a/ /i/ and /u/, with no diphthongs. Monolingual speakers pronounce them as [æ, ɪ, ʊ] respectively, but Spanish realizations [ä, i, u] may also be found. When the vowels appear adjacent to uvular consonants (/q/, /qʼ/, and /qʰ/), they are rendered more like [ɑ, ɛ, ɔ], respectively. There is debate about whether Cusco Quechua has five /a, e, i, o, u/ or three vowel phonemes: /a, ɪ, ʊ/.

While historically Proto-Quechua clearly had just three vowel phonemes /*a, *ɪ, *ʊ/, and although some other Quechua varieties have an increased number of vowels as a result of phonological vowel length emergence or of monophthongization, the current debate about the Cusco variety seems to be not phonological in matter but just orthographic.

Phoneme	IPA Phonetic realizations	3-vowel alphabet	5-vowel alphabet
/a/	[æ, a, ɑ]	a	a [æ, a, ɑ]
/i/	[i, ɪ, e, ɛ]	i	i [i, ɪ], e [e, ɛ]
/u/	[u, ʊ, o, ɔ]	u	u [u, ʊ], o [o, ɔ]

=== Consonants ===
Cusco Quechua consonant phonemes
		Bilabial	Alveolar	Postalv./ Palatal	Velar	Uvular	Glottal
Nasal		m	n	ɲ			
Plosive/ Affricate	tenuis	p	t	tʃ	k	q	
Plosive/ Affricate	aspirated	pʰ	tʰ	tʃʰ	kʰ	qʰ	
Plosive/ Affricate	ejective	pʼ	tʼ	tʃʼ	kʼ	qʼ	
Fricative			s	ʃ			h
Approximant	median			j	w		
Approximant	lateral		l	ʎ			
Tap			ɾ				

Gemination of the tap /ɾ/ results in a trill [r].

About 30% of the modern Quechua vocabulary is borrowed from Spanish, and some Spanish sounds (such as /f/, /b/, /d/, /ɡ/) may have become phonemic even among monolingual Quechua speakers.

== Grammar ==
=== Pronouns ===
Cusco Quechua	Northern Quechua	Ancash Quechua	English
noqa/ñoqa	ñuka	nuqa	I
qan	kan	qam	you
pay	pay	pay	he, she, it
noqanchis/ñoqanchis	ñukanchik (ñukapash kanpash)	nuqantsik	we (inclusive)
noqayku/ñoqayku	ñukanchik (shinapash mana kan/kikin)	nuqakuna	we (exclusive)
qankuna	qamkuna	qamkuna	you (plural)
paykuna	paykuna	paykuna	they

=== Nouns ===
Examples using the word wasi 'house'
Function		Suffix	Example	Translation
Suffix indicating number	Plural	-kuna	wasikuna	houses
Possessive suffix	1st person singular	-y	wasiy	my house
Possessive suffix	2nd person singular	-yki	wasiyki	your house
Possessive suffix	3rd person singular	-n	wasin	his/her/its house
Possessive suffix	1st person plural (incl.)	-nchis	wasinchis	our house (incl.)
Possessive suffix	1st person plural (excl.)	-y-ku	wasiyku	our house (excl.)
Possessive suffix	2nd person plural	-yki-chis	wasiykichis	your (pl.) house
Possessive suffix	3rd person plural	-n-ku	wasinku	their house
Suffixes indicating case	nominative	–	wasi	the house (subj.)
Suffixes indicating case	accusative	-(k)ta	wasita	the house (obj.)
Suffixes indicating case	instrumental	-wan	wasiwan	with the house, and the house
Suffixes indicating case	abessive	-naq	wasinaq	without the house
Suffixes indicating case	dative	-paq	wasipaq	to the house
Suffixes indicating case	genitive	-q/-pa	wasiq	of the house
Suffixes indicating case	causative	-rayku	wasirayku	because of the house
Suffixes indicating case	benefactive	-paq	wasipaq	for the house
Suffixes indicating case	locative	-pi	wasipi	at the house
Suffixes indicating case	directional	-man	wasiman	towards the house
Suffixes indicating case	inclusive	-piwan, puwan	wasipiwan, wasipuwan	including the house
Suffixes indicating case	terminative	-kama, -yaq	wasikama, wasiyaq	up to the house
Suffixes indicating case	transitive	-(rin)ta	wasinta	through the house
Suffixes indicating case	ablative	-manta, -piqta	wasimanta, wasipiqta	off/from the house
Suffixes indicating case	comitative	-(ni)ntin	wasintin	along with the house
Suffixes indicating case	immediate	-raq	wasiraq	first the house
Suffixes indicating case	intrative	-pura	wasipura	among the houses
Suffixes indicating case	exclusive	-lla(n)	wasilla(n)	only the house
Suffixes indicating case	comparative	-naw, -hina	wasinaw, wasihina	like the house

== See also ==
- Quechuan and Aymaran spelling shift
