= Quechuan languages =

Language family of the Andes in South America

Quechuan
- Qichwa/Qhichwa, Kichwa, Runa Simi
- Geographic distribution: Throughout the central Andes Mountains including Argentina, Bolivia, Chile, Colombia, Ecuador, and Peru.
- Ethnicity: Quechua
- Native speakers: 7.2 million
- Linguistic classification: One of the world's primary language families (or Quechumaran?)
- Proto-language: Proto-Quechuan
- Subdivisions: Quechua I; Quechua II

Language codes
- ISO 639-1: qu
- ISO 639-2 / 5: que
- ISO 639-3: que
- Glottolog: quec1387
- Linguasphere: 84-FAA
- Map showing the distribution of Quechuan languages

- Map showing the distribution of the Quechuan languages (solid gray) and the historical extent of the Inca Empire (shaded)

- Person: Runa / Nuna
- People: Runakuna / Nunakuna
- Language: Runasimi / Nunasimi

A short dialogue in Quechua.

Quechua (/ˈkɛtʃuə/; Spanish: [ˈketʃwa]), also called Runa simi in Southern Quechua (pronounced [ˈɾʊna ˈsɪmɪ], 'people's language'), is an indigenous language family that originated in central Peru and thereafter spread to other countries of the Andes. Derived from a common ancestral "Proto-Quechua" language, it is the most widely spoken pre-Columbian language family of the Americas, with an estimated 8–10 million speakers in 2004 and just under 7 million from the most recent census data available up to 2011. Approximately 13.9% (3.7 million) of Peruvians speak a Quechua language.

Although Quechua began expanding many centuries before the Incas, that previous expansion also meant that it was the primary language family within the Inca Empire. The Spanish tolerated its use until the Peruvian struggle for independence in the 1780s. As a result various Quechua languages are still widely spoken, being the majority language in a number of regions of Peru, the most-spoken or co-official language in many others and, as the Kichwa language, the second most-spoken language of Ecuador, after Spanish.

== History ==
The Quechua linguistic homeland may have been Central Peru. It has been speculated that it may have been used in the Chavín and Wari civilizations.

Quechua had already expanded across wide ranges of the central Andes long before the expansion of the Inca Empire. The Inca were one among many peoples in present-day Peru who already spoke a form of Quechua, which in the Cuzco region particularly was heavily influenced by Aymara, hence some of the characteristics that still distinguish the Cuzco form of Quechua today. Diverse Quechua regional dialects and languages had already developed in different areas, influenced by local languages, before the Inca Empire expanded and further promoted Quechua as the official language of the Empire.

After the Spanish conquest of Peru in the 16th century Quechua continued to be used widely by the indigenous peoples as the common language. It was officially recognized by the Spanish administration and many Spaniards learned it in order to communicate with local peoples. The clergy of the Catholic Church adopted Quechua to use as the language of evangelization. The oldest written records of the language are by missionary Domingo de Santo Tomás, who arrived in Peru in 1538 and learned the language from 1540. He published his Grammatica o arte de la lengua general de los indios de los reynos del Perú (Grammar or Art of the General Language of the Indians of the Kingdoms of Peru) in 1560. Given its use by the Catholic missionaries, the range of Quechua continued to expand in some areas.

In the late 18th century colonial officials ended the administrative and religious use of Quechua. They banned it from public use in Peru after the Túpac Amaru II rebellion of indigenous peoples. The Crown banned "loyal" pro-Catholic texts in Quechua, such as Garcilaso de la Vega's Comentarios Reales.

Despite a brief revival of the language immediately after the Latin American nations achieved independence in the 19th century, the prestige of Quechua had decreased sharply. Gradually its use declined so that it was spoken mostly by indigenous people in the more isolated and conservative rural areas. Nevertheless in the 21st century Quechua speakers number roughly 7 million people across South America, more than any other indigenous language family in the Americas.

As a result of Inca expansion into Central Chile, there were bilingual Quechua-Mapudungu Mapuche in Central Chile at the time of the Spanish arrival. It has been argued that Mapuche, Quechua and Spanish coexisted in Central Chile, with significant bilingualism, during the 17th century. Alongside Mapudungun, Quechua is the indigenous language that has influenced Chilean Spanish the most.

Quechua-Aymara and mixed Quechua-Aymara-Mapudungu toponymy can be found as far south as Osorno Province in Chile (latitude 41° S).

In 2017 the first thesis defense done in Quechua in Europe was done by Peruvian Carmen Escalante Gutiérrez at Pablo de Olavide University (Sevilla). The same year Pablo Landeo wrote the first novel in Quechua without a Spanish translation. A Peruvian student, Roxana Quispe Collantes of the University of San Marcos, completed and defended the first thesis in the language group in 2019; it concerned the works of poet Andrés Alencastre Gutiérrez and it was also the first non-Spanish native language thesis done at that university.

There are currently various initiatives promoting Quechua in the Andes and across the world: many universities offer Quechua classes, a community-based organization such as Elva Ambía's Quechua Collective of New York promote the language and governments are training interpreters in Quechua to serve in healthcare, justice and bureaucratic facilities.

== Current status ==
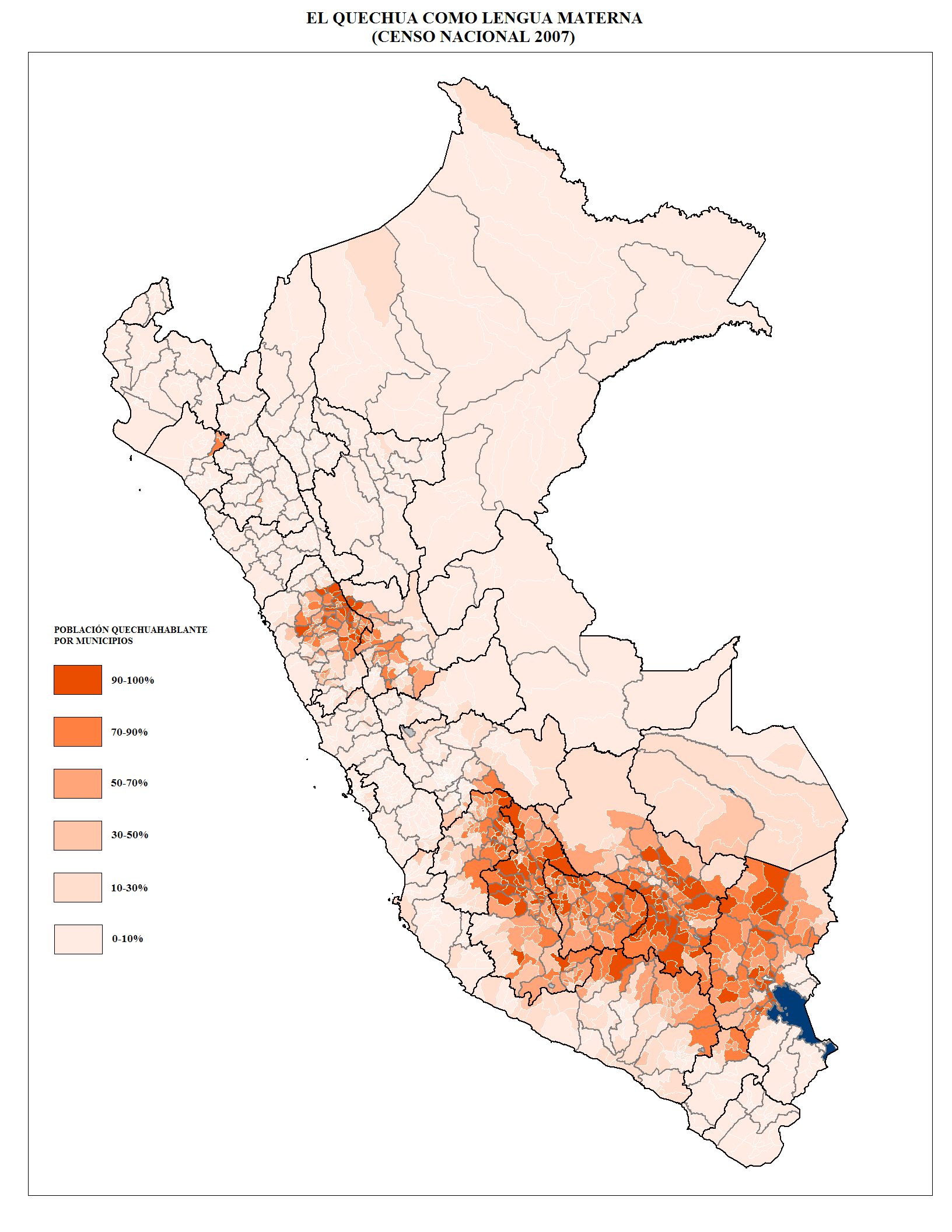
Map of Peru showing the distribution of overall Quechua speakers by district

In 1975, Peru became the first country to recognize Quechua as one of its official languages. Ecuador conferred official status on the language in its 2006 constitution and in 2009 Bolivia adopted a new constitution that recognized Quechua and several other indigenous languages as official languages of the country.

The major obstacle to the usage and teaching of Quechua languages is the lack of written materials, such as books, newspapers, software and magazines. The Bible has been translated into Quechua and is distributed by certain missionary groups. Quechua, along with Aymara and minor indigenous languages, remains essentially a spoken language.

In recent years Quechua has been introduced in intercultural bilingual education (IBE) in Peru, Bolivia and Ecuador. Even in these areas the governments are reaching only a part of the Quechua-speaking populations. Some indigenous people in each of the countries are having their children taught in Spanish for social advancement.

Radio Nacional del Perú broadcasts news and agrarian programs in Quechua for periods in the mornings.

Quechua and Spanish are now heavily intermixed in much of the Andean region, with many hundreds of Spanish loanwords in Quechua. Similarly Quechua phrases and words are commonly used by Spanish speakers. In southern rural Bolivia, for instance, many Quechua words such as wawa (infant), misi (cat) and waska (strap or thrashing) are as commonly used as their Spanish counterparts, even in entirely Spanish-speaking areas. Quechua has also had a significant influence on other native languages of the Americas, such as Mapuche.

=== Number of speakers ===
It is difficult to calculate the number of Quechua speakers. The number of speakers given varies widely according to the sources. The total in Ethnologue 16 is 10 million, primarily based on figures published in 1987–2002 but with a few dating from the 1960s. The figure for Imbabura Highland Quechua in Ethnologue, for example, is 300,000, an estimate from 1977.

The missionary organization FEDEPI, on the other hand, estimated one million Imbabura dialect speakers (published 2006). Census figures are also problematic owing to under-reporting. The 2001 Ecuador census reports only 500,000 Quechua speakers, compared with the estimate in most linguistic sources of more than 2 million. The censuses of Peru (2007) and Bolivia (2001) are thought to be more reliable.

- Argentina: 900,000 (1971)
- Bolivia: 2,100,000 (2001 census); 2,800,000 South Bolivian (1987)
- Chile: few, if any; 8,200 in ethnic group (2002 census)
- Colombia: 4,402 to 16,000
- Ecuador: 2,300,000 (Adelaar 1991)
- Peru: 3,800,000 (2017 census); 3,500,000 to 4,400,000 (Adelaar 2000)

Additionally there is an unknown number of speakers in emigrant communities.

== Classification ==
The four branches of Quechua: I (Central), II-A (North Peruvian), II-B (Northern), II-C (Southern)

There are significant differences among the varieties of Quechua spoken in the central Peruvian highlands and the peripheral varieties of Ecuador as well as those of southern Peru and Bolivia. They can be labeled Quechua I (or Quechua B, central) and Quechua II (or Quechua A, peripheral). Within the two groups there are few sharp boundaries, making them dialect continua.

However there is a secondary division in Quechua II between the grammatically simplified northern varieties of Ecuador, Quechua II-B, known there as Kichwa, and the generally more conservative varieties of the southern highlands, Quechua II-C, which include the old Inca capital of Cusco. The closeness is at least in part because of the influence of Cusco Quechua on the Ecuadorean varieties in the Inca Empire. Because Northern nobles were required to educate their children in Cusco, this was maintained as the prestige dialect in the north.

Speakers from different points within any of the three regions can generally understand one another reasonably well. There are nonetheless significant local-level differences across each. (Wanka Quechua, in particular, has several very distinctive characteristics that make the variety more challenging to understand, even for other Central Quechua speakers.) Speakers from different major regions, particularly Central or Southern Quechua, are not able to communicate effectively.

The lack of mutual intelligibility among the dialects is the basic criterion that defines Quechua not as a single language but as a language family. The complex and progressive nature of how speech varies across the dialect continua makes it nearly impossible to differentiate discrete varieties; Ethnologue lists 45 varieties, which are then divided into two groups - Central and Peripheral. The non-intelligibility between the two groups means they are all classified as separate languages.

As a reference point the overall degree of diversity across the family is a little less than that of the Romance or Germanic families and more of the order of Slavic or Arabic. The greatest diversity is within Central Quechua, or Quechua I, which is believed to lie close to the homeland of the ancestral Proto-Quechua language.

=== Family tree ===
Alfredo Torero devised the traditional classification, the three divisions above, plus a fourth, a northern or Peruvian branch. The latter causes complications in the classification, however, since various dialects (e.g. Cajamarca–Cañaris, Pacaraos and Yauyos) have features of both Quechua I and Quechua II and so are difficult to assign to either.

Torero classifies them as the following:

- Quechuan
  - Quechua I or Quechua B, a.k.a. Central Quechua or Waywash, spoken in Peru's central highlands and coast.
    - The most widely spoken varieties are Huaylas, Huaylla Wanca, and Conchuco
  - Quechua II or Quechua A or Peripheral Quechua or Wanp'una, divided into
    - Yungay (Yunkay) Quechua or Quechua II A, spoken in the northern mountains of Peru; the most widely spoken dialect is Cajamarca.
    - Northern Quechua or Quechua II B, spoken in Ecuador (Kichwa), northern Peru, and Colombia (Inga Kichwa)
      - The most widely spoken varieties in this group are Chimborazo Highland Quichua and Imbabura Highland Quichua.
    - Southern Quechua or Quechua II C, spoken in Bolivia, Chile, southern Peru and Northwest Argentina.
      - The most widely spoken varieties are South Bolivian, Cusco, Ayacucho, and Puno (Collao).

Willem Adelaar adheres to the Quechua I / Quechua II (central/peripheral) bifurcation. But, partially following later modifications by Torero, he reassigns part of Quechua II-A to Quechua I:

- Proto‑Quechua
  - Quechua I
    - Central
      - Ancash (Huaylas–Conchucos)
      - Alto Pativilca–Alto Marañón–Alto Huallaga
      - Yaru
      - Wanka (Jauja–Huanca)
      - Yauyos–Chincha (Huangáscar–Topará)
    - Pacaraos
  - Quechua II
    - Cajamarca–Cañaris (Quechua II-A, reduced)
      - Lambayeque (Cañaris)
      - Cajamarca
    - (Quechua II‑A split)
      Lincha
    - (Quechua II‑A split)
      Laraos
    - - Northern Quechua (Quechua II‑B)
        - Kichwa ("Ecuadorian" or Highlands and Oriente)
        - Chachapoyas (Amazonas)
        - Lamas (San Martín)
      - Southern Quechua (Quechua II-C)
        - Ayacucho
        - Cusco
        - Puno (Collao)
        - Northern Bolivian (Apolo)
        - Southern Bolivia
        - Santiago del Estero

Landerman (1991) does not believe a true genetic classification is possible and divides Quechua II so that the family has four geographical–typological branches: Northern, North Peruvian, Central, and Southern. He includes Chachapoyas and Lamas in North Peruvian Quechua so Ecuadorian is synonymous with Northern Quechua.

=== Geographical distribution ===
Quechua I (Central Quechua, Waywash) is spoken in Peru's central highlands, from the Ancash Region to Huancayo. It is the most diverse branch of Quechua, to the extent that its divisions are commonly considered different languages.

Quechua II (Peripheral Quechua, Wamp'una "Traveler")

- II-A: Yunkay Quechua (North Peruvian Quechua) is scattered in Peru's occidental highlands.
- II-B: Northern Quechua (also known as Runashimi or, especially in Ecuador, Kichwa) is mainly spoken in Colombia and Ecuador. It is also spoken in the Amazonian lowlands of Colombia and Ecuador, and in pockets of Peru.
- II-C: Southern Quechua, in the highlands further south, from Huancavelica through the Ayacucho, Cusco, and Puno regions of Peru, across much of Bolivia, and in pockets in north-western Argentina. It is the most influential branch, with the largest number of speakers and the most important cultural and literary legacy.

=== Cognates ===
This is a sampling of words in several Quechuan languages:

| | Ancash (I) | Wanka (I) | Cajamarca (II-A) | San Martin (II-B) | Kichwa (II-B) | Ayacucho (II-C) | Cusco (II-C) |
| 'one' | huk [uk ~ huk] | suk, huk [suk], [huk] | suq [soχ] | suk [suk] | shuk [ʃuk] | huk [huk] | huk [hoχ] |
| 'two' | ishkay [ɪʃkeˑ ~ ɪʃkɐj] | ishkay [iʃkaj] | ishkay [ɪʃkɐj] | ishkay [iʃkaj] | ishkay [iʃki ~ iʃkaj] | iskay [iskæj] | iskay [iskæj] |
| 'ten' | ćhunka, chunka [ʈ͡ʂʊŋkɐ], [t͡ʃʊŋkɐ] | ćhunka [ʈ͡ʂuŋka] | ch'unka [ʈ͡ʂʊŋɡɐ] | chunka [t͡ʃuŋɡa] | chunka [t͡ʃuŋɡɐ ~ t͡ʃuŋkɐ] | chunka [t͡ʃuŋkɐ] | chunka [t͡ʃuŋkɐ] |
| 'sweet' | mishki [mɪʃkɪ] | mishki [mɪʃkɪ] | mishki [mɪʃkɪ] | mishki [mɪʃkɪ] | mishki [mɪʃkɪ] | miski [mɪskɪ] | misk'i [mɪskʼɪ] |
| 'white' | yuraq [jʊɾɑq ~ jʊɾɑχ] | yulaq [julah ~ julaː] | yuraq [jʊɾɑx] | yurak [jʊɾak] | yurak [jʊɾax ~ jʊɾak] | yuraq [jʊɾɑχ] | yuraq [jʊɾɑχ] |
| 'he gives' | qun [qoŋ ~ χoŋ ~ ʁoŋ] | qun [huŋ ~ ʔuŋ] | qun [qoŋ] | kun [kuŋ] | kun [kuŋ] | qun [χoŋ] | qun [qoŋ] |
| 'yes' | awmi [oːmi ~ ɐwmɪ] | aw [aw] | ari [ɐɾi] | ari [aɾi] | ari [aɾi] | arí [ɐˈɾi] | arí [ɐˈɾi] |

=== Quechua and Aymara ===
Quechua shares a large amount of vocabulary, and some striking structural parallels, with Aymara, and the two families have sometimes been grouped together as a "Quechumaran family". This hypothesis is generally rejected by specialists, however. The parallels are better explained by mutual influence and borrowing through intensive and long-term contact. Many Quechua–Aymara cognates are close, often closer than intra-Quechua cognates, and there is a little relationship in the affixal system. The Puquina language of the Tiwanaku Empire is a possible source for some of the shared vocabulary between Quechua and Aymara.

=== Language contact ===
Jolkesky (2016) notes that there are lexical similarities with the Kunza, Leko, Mapudungun, Mochika, Uru-Chipaya, Zaparo, Arawak, Kandoshi, Muniche, Pukina, Pano, Barbakoa, Cholon-Hibito, Jaqi, Jivaro, and Kawapana language families due to contact.

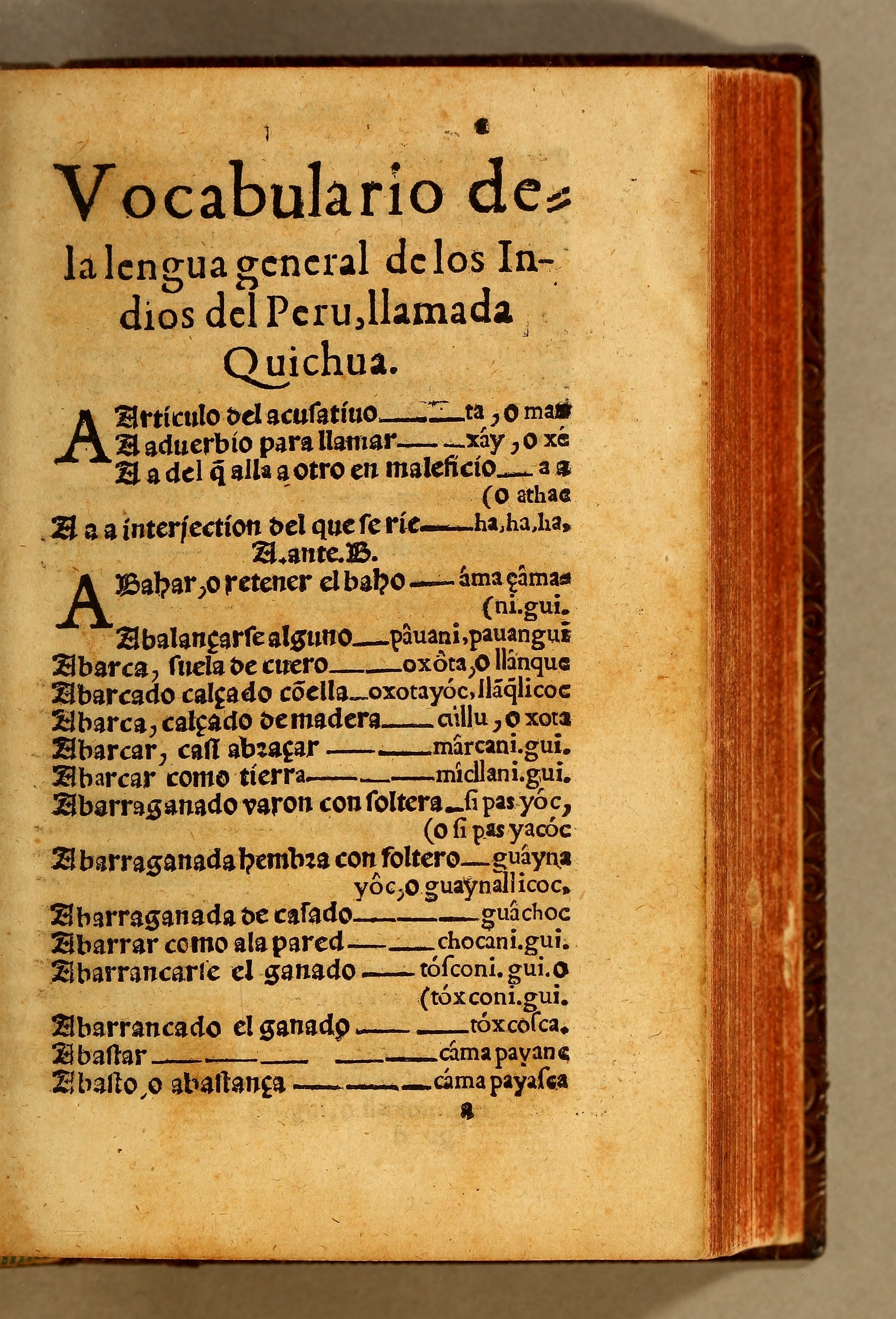
Vocabulary of the general language of the Indians of Peru, called Quichua (1560). From Domingo de Santo Tomás, the first writer in Quechua.

== Vocabulary ==
Quechua has borrowed a large number of Spanish words, such as piru (from pero, "but"), bwenu (from bueno, "good"), iskwila (from escuela, "school"), waka (from vaca, "cow") and wuru (from burro, "donkey").

A number of Quechua words have entered English and French via Spanish, including coca, condor, guano, jerky, llama, pampa, poncho, puma, quinine, quinoa, vicuña (vigogne in French), and, possibly, gaucho. The word lagniappe comes from the Quechuan word yapay "to increase, to add". The word first came into Spanish then Louisiana French, with the French or Spanish article la in front of it, la ñapa in Louisiana French or Creole, or la yapa in Spanish. A rare instance of a Quechua word being taken into general Spanish use is given by carpa for "tent" (Quechua karpa).

The Quechua influence on Latin American Spanish includes such borrowings as papa "potato", chuchaqui "hangover" in Ecuador, and diverse borrowings for "altitude sickness": suruqch'i in Bolivia, sorojchi in Ecuador, and soroche in Peru.

In Bolivia, particularly, Quechua words are used extensively even by non-Quechua speakers. These include wawa "baby, infant", chʼaki "hangover", misi "cat", jukʼucho "mouse", qʼumer uchu "green pepper", jaku "let's go", chhiri and chhurco "curly haired", among many others. Quechua grammar also enters Bolivian Spanish, such as the use of the suffix -ri. In Bolivian Quechua, -ri is added to verbs to signify an action is performed with affection or, in the imperative, as a rough equivalent to "please". In Bolivia, -ri is often included in the Spanish imperative to imply "please" or to soften commands. For example, the standard pásame "pass me [something]" becomes pasarime.

=== Etymology of Quechua ===
At first, Spaniards referred to the language of the Inca empire as the lengua general, the general tongue. The name quichua was first used in 1560 by Domingo de Santo Tomás in his Grammatica o arte de la lengua general de los indios de los reynos del Perú. It is not known what name the native speakers gave to their language before colonial times and whether it was Spaniards who called it quechua.

There are two possible etymologies of Quechua as the name of the language. There is a possibility that the name Quechua was derived from *qiĉwa, the native word which originally meant the "temperate valley" altitude ecological zone in the Andes (suitable for maize cultivation) and to its inhabitants. Alternatively, Pedro Cieza de León and Inca Garcilaso de la Vega, the early Spanish chroniclers, mention the existence of a people called Quichua in the present Apurímac Region, and it could be inferred that their name was given to the entire language.

The Hispanicised spellings Quechua and Quichua have been used in Peru and Bolivia since the 17th century, especially after the Third Council of Lima. Today, the various local pronunciations of "Quechua" include [ˈqʰeʃwa ~ ˈqʰeswa], [ˈχɪt͡ʃwa], [ˈkit͡ʃwa], and [ˈʔiʈ͡ʂwa].

Another name that native speakers give to their own language is runa simi, "language of man/people"; it also seems to have emerged during the colonial period.

== Phonology ==
=== Consonants ===
Voiceless bilabial plosives
Pronunciation of the voiceless bilabial plosives of Cusco Quechua

Voicing is not phonemic in Cusco Quechua. Cusco Quechua, North Bolivian Quechua, and South Bolivian Quechua are the only varieties to have glottalized consonants. They, along with certain kinds of Ecuadorian Kichwa, are the only varieties which have aspirated consonants. Because reflexes of a given Proto-Quechua word may have different stops in neighboring dialects (Proto-Quechua *čaki 'foot' becomes č'aki and Proto-Quechua *čaka 'bridge' becomes čaka), they are thought to be innovations in Quechua from Aymara, borrowed independently after branching off from Proto-Quechua.

=== Stress ===
Stress is penultimate in most dialects of Quechua. In some varieties, factors such as the apocope of word-final vowels may cause exceptional final stress. Stress in Chachapoyas Quechua falls word-initially.

== Orthography ==
Quechua has been written using the Roman alphabet since the Spanish conquest of Peru. However, written Quechua is rarely used by Quechua speakers due to limited amounts of printed material in the language.

Until the 20th century, Quechua was written with a Spanish-based orthography, for example Inca, Huayna Cápac, Collasuyo, Mama Ocllo, Viracocha, quipu, tambo, condor. This orthography is the most familiar to Spanish speakers, and so it has been used for most borrowings into English, which essentially always happens through Spanish.

In 1975, the Peruvian government of Juan Velasco Alvarado adopted a new orthography for Quechua. This is the system preferred by the Academia Mayor de la Lengua Quechua, which results in the following spellings of the examples listed above: Inka, Wayna Qhapaq, Qollasuyu, Mama Oqllo, Wiraqocha, khipu, tampu, kuntur. This orthography has the following features:

- It uses w instead of hu for /w/.
- It distinguishes velar k from uvular q, both of which were spelled c or qu in the traditional system.
- It distinguishes simple, ejective, and aspirated stops in dialects that make these distinctions, such as that of the Cusco Region, e.g. the aspirated khipu 'knot'.
- It continues to use the Spanish five-vowel system.

In 1985, a variation of this system was adopted by the Peruvian government that uses the Quechuan three-vowel system, resulting in the following spellings: Inka, Wayna Qhapaq, Qullasuyu, Mama Uqllu, Wiraqucha, khipu, tampu, kuntur.

The different orthographies are still highly controversial in Peru. Advocates of the traditional system believe that the new orthographies look too foreign and believe that it makes Quechua harder to learn for people who have first been exposed to written Spanish. Those who prefer the new system maintain that it better matches the phonology of Quechua, and they point to studies showing that teaching the five-vowel system to children later causes reading difficulties in Spanish.

For more on this, see Quechuan and Aymaran spelling shift.

Writers differ in the treatment of Spanish loanwords. These are sometimes adapted to modern orthography and sometimes left as in Spanish. For instance, "I am Roberto" could be written Robertom kani or Ruwirtum kani. (The -m is not part of the name; it is an evidential suffix, showing how the information is known: firsthand, in this case.)

In Cusco, Peru, the ancient capital of the Incas, there is a debate where some scholars claim that Quechua has three vowels while others claim it has five.

The Peruvian linguist Rodolfo Cerrón Palomino has proposed an orthographic norm for all of Southern Quechua: this Standard Quechua (el Quechua estándar or Hanan Runasimi) conservatively integrates features of the two widespread dialects Ayacucho Quechua and Cusco Quechua. For instance:

| English | Ayacucho | Cusco | Standard Quechua |
|---|---|---|---|
| to drink | upyay | uhyay | upyay |
| fast | utqa | usqha | utqha |
| to work | llamkay | llank'ay | llamk'ay |
| we (inclusive) | ñuqanchik | nuqanchis | ñuqanchik |
| (progressive suffix) | -chka- | -sha- | -chka- |
| day | punchaw | p'unchay | p'unchaw |

The Spanish-based orthography is now in conflict with Peruvian law. According to article 20 of the decree Decreto Supremo No 004-2016-MC, which approves regulations relative to Law 29735, published in the official newspaper El Peruano on July 22, 2016, adequate spellings of the toponyms in the normalized alphabets of the indigenous languages must progressively be proposed, with the aim of standardizing the spellings used by the National Geographic Institute (Instituto Geográfico Nacional, IGN) The IGN implements the necessary changes on the official maps of Peru.

== Grammar ==
=== Morphological type ===
Quechua is an agglutinating language, meaning that words are built up from basic roots followed by several suffixes, each of which carries one meaning. Their large number of suffixes changes both the overall meaning of words and their subtle shades of meaning. All varieties of Quechua are very regular agglutinative languages, as opposed to isolating ones, which have no inflections, or fusional ones, which use single inflectional morphemes for multiple grammatical, syntactic, or semantic features, and may contain more irregular inflections [Thompson]. Their normal sentence order is SOV (subject–object–verb). Notable grammatical features include bipersonal conjugation (verbs agree with both subject and object), evidentiality (indication of the source and veracity of knowledge), a set of topic particles, and suffixes indicating who benefits from an action and the speaker's attitude toward it, but some varieties may lack some of the characteristics.

=== Pronouns ===
Number
Singular
Plural
Person
First
Ñuqa
Ñuqanchik (inclusive)

Ñuqayku (exclusive)

Second
Qam
Qamkuna
Third
Pay
Paykuna

In Quechua, there are seven pronouns, gender distinction does not exist. First-person plural pronouns (equivalent to "we") may be inclusive or exclusive; which mean, respectively, that the addressee ("you") is or is not part of the "we". Quechua also adds the suffix -kuna to the second and third person singular pronouns qam and pay to create the plural forms, qam-kuna and pay-kuna. In Quechua IIB, or "Kichwa", the exclusive first-person plural pronoun, "ñuqayku", is generally obsolete.

=== Adjectives ===
Adjectives in Quechua are always placed before nouns and are invariable.

=== Numbers ===
- Cardinal numbers. ch'usaq (0), huk (1), iskay (2), kimsa (3), tawa (4), pichqa (5), suqta (6), qanchis (7), pusaq (8), isqun (9), chunka (10), chunka hukniyuq (11), chunka iskayniyuq (12), iskay chunka (20), pachak (100), waranqa (1,000), hunu (1,000,000), lluna (1,000,000,000,000, i.e. a trillion).
- Ordinal numbers. To form ordinal numbers, the word ñiqin is put after the appropriate cardinal number (iskay ñiqin = "second"). The only exception is that, in addition to huk ñiqin ("first"), the phrase ñawpaq is also used in the somewhat more restricted sense of "the initial, primordial, the oldest".

=== Nouns ===
Like pronouns, they are genderless. There are no articles either. Noun roots accept suffixes that indicate number, case, and the person of a possessor. In general, the possessive suffix precedes that of number. In the Santiago del Estero variety, however, the order is reversed. From variety to variety, suffixes may change. The use of the -kuna plural suffix is largely facultative in nouns, like in many languages where number indication is optional.

Examples using the word wasi (house)
| Function | | Suffix | Example | (translation) |
|---|---|---|---|---|
| suffix indicating number | plural | -kuna | wasikuna | houses |
| possessive suffix | 1.person singular | -y, -: | wasiy, wasii | my house |
| possessive suffix | 2.person singular | -yki | wasiyki | your house |
| possessive suffix | 3.person singular | -n | wasin | his/her/its house |
| possessive suffix | 1.person plural (incl) | -nchik | wasinchik | our house (incl.) |
| possessive suffix | 1.person plural (excl) | -y-ku | wasiyku | our house (excl.) |
| possessive suffix | 2.person plural | -yki-chik | wasiykichik | your (pl.) house |
| possessive suffix | 3.person plural | -n-ku | wasinku | their house |
| suffixes indicating case | nominative | – | wasi | the house (subj.) |
| suffixes indicating case | accusative | -(k)ta | wasita | the house (obj.) |
| suffixes indicating case | instrumental | -wan | wasiwan | with the house, and the house |
| suffixes indicating case | abessive | -naq/-nax/-naa | wasinaq | without the house |
| suffixes indicating case | dative/benefactive | -paq/-pax/-paa | wasipaq | to/for the house |
| suffixes indicating case | genitive | -p(a) | wasip(a) | the house's |
| suffixes indicating case | causative | -rayku | wasirayku | because of the house |
| suffixes indicating case | locative | -pi | wasipi | at the house |
| suffixes indicating case | directional | -man | wasiman | towards the house |
| suffixes indicating case | inclusive | -piwan, puwan | wasipiwan, wasipuwan | including the house |
| suffixes indicating case | terminative | -kama, -yaq | wasikama, wasiyaq | up to the house |
| suffixes indicating case | transitive | -(ni)nta | wasinta | through the house |
| suffixes indicating case | ablative | -manta, -piqta, -pu | wasimanta, wasipiqta | off/from the house |
| suffixes indicating case | comitative | -(ni)ntin | wasintin | along with the house |
| suffixes indicating case | immediate | -raq/-rax/-raa | wasiraq | first the house |
| suffixes indicating case | intrative | -pura | wasipura | among the houses |
| suffixes indicating case | exclusive | -lla(m) | wasilla(m) | only the house |
| suffixes indicating case | comparative | -naw, -hina | wasinaw, wasihina | than the house |

=== Adverbs ===
Adverbs can be formed by adding -ta or, in some cases, -lla to an adjective: allin – allinta ("good – well"), utqay – utqaylla ("quick – quickly"). They are also formed by adding suffixes to demonstratives: chay ("that") – chaypi ("there"), kay ("this") – kayman ("hither").

There are several original adverbs. For Europeans, it is striking that the adverb qhipa means both "behind" and "future" and ñawpa means "ahead, in front" and "past". Local and temporal concepts of adverbs in Quechua (as well as in Aymara) are associated to each other reversely, compared to European languages. For the speakers of Quechua, we are moving backwards into the future (we cannot see it: it is unknown), facing the past (we can see it: it is remembered).

=== Verbs ===
The infinitive forms have the suffix -y (e.g.., much'a 'kiss'; much'a-y 'to kiss'). These are the typical endings for the indicative in a Southern Quechua (IIC) dialect:

| | Present | Past | Past habitual | Future | Pluperfect | Optative |
|---|---|---|---|---|---|---|
| ñuqa | -ni | -rqa-ni | -qka-ni | -saq | -sqa-ni | -yman |
| qam | -nki | -rqa-nki | -qka-nki | -nki | -sqa-nki | -nki-man -waq |
| pay | -n | -rqa(-n) | -q | -nqa | -sqa | -nman |
| ñuqanchik | -nchik | -rqa-nchik | -qka-nchik | -su-nchik | -sqa-nchik | -nchik-man -sun(-chik)-man -swan |
| ñuqayku | -yku | -rqa-yku | -qka-yku | -saq-ku | -sqa-yku | -yku-man |
| qamkuna | -nki-chik | -rqa-nki-chik | -qka-nki-chik | -nki-chik | -sqa-nki-chik | -nki-chik-man -waq-chik |
| paykuna | -n-ku | -rqa-(n)ku | -q-ku | -nqa-ku | -sqa-ku | -nku-man |

The suffixes shown in the table above usually indicate the subject; the person of the object is also indicated by a suffix, which precedes the suffixes in the table. For the second person, it is -su-, and for the first person, it is -wa- in most Quechua II dialects. In such cases, the plural suffixes from the table (-chik and -ku) can be used to express the number of the object rather than the subject. There is a lot of variation between the dialects in the exact rules which determine this. In Central Quechua, however, the verbal morphology differs in a number of respects: most notably, the verbal plural suffixes -chik and -ku are not used, and plurality is expressed by different suffixes that are located before rather than after the personal suffixes. Furthermore, the 1st person singular object suffix is -ma-, rather than -wa-.

=== Grammatical particles ===
Particles are indeclinable: they do not accept suffixes. They are relatively rare, but the most common are arí 'yes' and mana 'no', although mana can take some suffixes, such as -n/-m (manan/manam), -raq (manaraq 'not yet') and -chu (manachu? 'or not?'), to intensify the meaning. Other particles are yaw 'hey, hi', and certain loan words from Spanish, such as piru (from Spanish pero 'but') and sinuqa (from sino 'rather').

=== Evidentiality ===
The Quechuan languages have three different morphemes that mark evidentiality. Evidentiality refers to a morpheme whose primary purpose is to indicate the source of information. In Quechuan languages, evidentiality is a three-term system: there are three evidential morphemes that mark varying levels of source information. The markers can apply to first, second, and third persons. The chart below depicts an example of these morphemes from Wanka Quechua:

Evidential morphemes
| -m(i) | -chr(a) | -sh(i) |
|---|---|---|
| Direct evidence | Inferred; conjecture | Reported; hearsay |

The parentheses around the vowels indicate that the vowel can be dropped when following an open vowel. For the sake of cohesiveness, the above forms are used to discuss the evidential morphemes. There are dialectal variations to the forms. The variations will be presented in the following descriptions.

The following sentences provide examples of the three evidentials and further discuss the meaning behind each of them.

==== -m(i) : Direct evidence and commitment ====
Regional variations: In Cusco Quechua, the direct evidential presents itself as –mi and –n.

The evidential –mi indicates that the speaker has a "strong personal conviction the veracity of the circumstance expressed." It has the basis of direct personal experience.

Wanka Quechua

ñawi-i-wan-mi lika-la-a
eye-1P-with-DIR see-PST-1
I saw them with my own eyes.

==== -chr(a) : Inference and attenuation ====
In Quechuan languages, not specified by the source, the inference morpheme appears as -ch(i), -ch(a), -chr(a).

The -chr(a) evidential indicates that the utterance is an inference or form of conjecture. That inference relays the speaker's non-commitment to the truth-value of the statement. It also appears in cases such as acquiescence, irony, interrogative constructions, and first person inferences. These uses constitute nonprototypical use and will be discussed later in the changes in meaning and other uses section.

Wanka Quechua

kuti-mu-n'a-qa-chr ni-ya-ami
return-AFAR-3FUT-now-CONJ say-IMPV-1-DIR
I think they will probably come back.

==== -sh(i) : Hearsay ====
Regional variations: It can appear as –sh(i) or –s(i) depending on the dialect.

With the use of this morpheme, the speaker "serves as a conduit through which information from another source passes." The information being related is hearsay or revelatory in nature. It also works to express the uncertainty of the speaker regarding the situation. However, it also appears in other constructions that are discussed in the changes in meaning section.

Wanka Quechua

shanti-sh prista-ka-mu-la
Shanti-HSY borrow-REF-AFAR-PST
(I was told) Shanti borrowed it.

Hintz discusses an interesting case of evidential behavior found in the Sihaus dialect of Ancash Quechua. The author postulates that instead of three single evidential markers, that Quechuan language contains three pairs of evidential markers.

==== Affix or clitic ====
The evidential morphemes have been referred to as markers or morphemes. The literature seems to differ on whether or not the evidential morphemes are acting as affixes or clitics, in some cases, such as Wanka Quechua, enclitics. Lefebvre and Muysken (1998) discuss this issue in terms of case but remark the line between affix and clitic is not clear. Both terms are used interchangeably throughout these sections.

==== Position in the sentence ====
Evidentials in the Quechuan languages are "second position enclitics", which usually attach to the first constituent in the sentence, as shown in this example.

huk-si ka-sqa huk machucha-piwan payacha
once-HSY be-SD one old.man-WITH woman
Once, there were an old man and an old woman.

They can, however, also occur on a focused constituent.

Pidru kunana-mi wasi-ta tuwa-sha-n
Pedro now-DIR.EV house-ACC build-PROG-3SG
It is now that Pedro is building the house.

Sometimes, the affix is described as attaching to the focus, particularly in the Tarma dialect of Yaru Quechua, but this does not hold true for all varieties of Quechua. In Huanuco Quechua, the evidentials may follow any number of topics, marked by the topic marker –qa, and the element with the evidential must precede the main verb or be the main verb.

However, there are exceptions to that rule, and the more topics there are in a sentence, the more likely the sentence is to deviate from the usual pattern.

Chawrana-qa puntataruu-qu trayaruptin-qa wamrata-qa mayna-shi Diosninchi-qa heqarkaykachisha syelutana-shi
so:already-TOP at:the:peak-TOP arriving-TOP child-TOP already-IND our:God-TOP had:taken:her:up to:heaven:already-IND
When she (the witch) reached the peak, God had already taken the child up into heaven.

==== Changes in meaning and other uses ====
Evidentials can be used to relay different meanings depending on the context and perform other functions. The following examples are restricted to Wanka Quechua.

The direct evidential, -mi

The direct evidential appears in wh-questions and yes/no questions. By considering the direct evidential in terms of prototypical semantics, it seems somewhat counterintuitive to have a direct evidential, basically an evidential that confirms the speaker's certainty about a topic, in a question. However, if one focuses less on the structure and more on the situation, some sense can be made. The speaker is asking the addressee for information so the speaker assumes the addressee knows the answer. That assumption is where the direct evidential comes into play. The speaker holds a certain amount of certainty that the addressee will know the answer. The speaker interprets the addressee as being in "direct relation" to the proposed content; the situation is the same as when, in regular sentences, the speaker assumes direct relation to the proposed information.

imay-mi wankayuu-pu kuti-mu-la
when-DIR Huancayo-ABL return-AFAR-PAST
When did he come back from Huancayo?
(Floyd 1999, p. 85)

The direct evidential affix is also seen in yes/no questions, similar to the situation with wh-questions. Floyd describes yes/no questions as being "characterized as instructions to the addressee to assert one of the propositions of a disjunction." Once again, the burden of direct evidence is being placed on the addressee, not on the speaker. The question marker in Wanka Quechua, -chun, is derived from the negative –chu marker and the direct evidential (realized as –n in some dialects).

tarma-kta li-n-chun
Tarma-ACC go-3-Y/N?
Is he going to Tarma?
(Floyd 1999, p. 89)

==== Inferential evidential, -chr(a) ====
While –chr(a) is usually used in an inferential context, it has some non-prototypical uses.

Mild Exhortation In these constructions the evidential works to reaffirm and encourage the addressee's actions or thoughts.

mas kalu-kuna-kta li-la-a ni-nki-chra-ri
more far-PL-ACC go-PST-1 say-2-CONJ-EMPH
Yes, tell them, "I've gone farther."
(Floyd 1999, p. 107)

This example comes from a conversation between husband and wife, discussing the reactions of their family and friends after they have been gone for a while. The husband says he plans to stretch the truth and tell them about distant places to which he has gone, and his wife (in the example above) echoes and encourages his thoughts.

Acquiescence With these, the evidential is used to highlight the speaker's assessment of inevitability of an event and acceptance of it. There is a sense of resistance, diminished enthusiasm, and disinclination in these constructions.

paaga-lla-shrayki-chra-a
pay-POL-1›2FUT-CONJ-EMPH
I suppose I'll pay you then.
(Floyd 1999, p. 109)

This example comes from a discourse where a woman demands compensation from the man (the speaker in the example) whose pigs ruined her potatoes. He denies the pigs as being his but finally realizes he may be responsible and produces the above example.

Interrogative Somewhat similar to the –mi evidential, the inferential evidential can be found in content questions. However, the salient difference between the uses of the evidentials in questions is that in the –m(i) marked questions, an answer is expected. That is not the case with –chr(a) marked questions.

ima-lla-kta-chr u-you-shrun llapa ayllu-kuna-kta-si chra-alu-l
what-LIM-ACC-CONJ give-ASP-12FUT all family-PL-ACC-EVEN arrive-ASP-SS
I wonder what we will give our families when we arrive.
(Floyd 1999, p. 111)

Irony Irony in language can be a somewhat complicated topic in how it functions differently in languages, and by its semantic nature, it is already somewhat vague. For these purposes, it is suffice to say that when irony takes place in Wanka Quechua, the –chr(a) marker is used.

chay-nuu-pa-chr yachra-nki
that-SIM-GEN-CONJ know-2
(I suppose) That's how you learn [that is the way in which you will learn].
(Floyd 199, p. 115)

This example comes from discourse between a father and daughter about her refusal to attend school. It can be interpreted as a genuine statement (perhaps one can learn by resisting school) or as an ironic statement (that is an absurd idea).

==== Hearsay evidential, -sh(i) ====
Aside from being used to express hearsay and revelation, this affix also has other uses.

Folktales, myths, and legends

Because folktales, myths, and legends are, in essence, reported speech, it follows that the hearsay marker would be used with them. Many of these types of stories are passed down through generations, furthering this aspect of reported speech. A difference between simple hearsay and folktales can be seen in the frequency of the –sh(i) marker. In normal conversation using reported speech, the marker is used less, to avoid redundancy.

Riddles

Riddles are somewhat similar to myths and folktales in that their nature is to be passed by word of mouth.

ima-lla-shi ayka-lla-sh juk machray-chru puñu-ya-n puka waaka
what-LIM-HSY how^much-LIM-HSY one cave-LOC sleep-IMPF-3 red cow
What is it? How much? A red cow is sleeping in a cave. [ans: a tongue]
(Floyd 1999, p. 142)

==== Omission and overuse of evidential affixes ====
In certain grammatical structures, the evidential marker does not appear at all. In all Quechuan languages the evidential will not appear in a dependent clause. No example was given to depict this omission. Omissions occur in Quechua. The sentence is understood to have the same evidentiality as the other sentences in the context. Quechuan speakers vary as to how much they omit evidentials, but they occur only in connected speech.

An interesting contrast to omission of evidentials is overuse of evidentials. If a speaker uses evidentials too much with no reason, competence is brought into question. For example, the overuse of –m(i) could lead others to believe that the speaker is not a native speaker or, in some extreme cases, that one is mentally ill.

==== Cultural aspect ====
By using evidentials, the Quechua culture has certain assumptions about the information being relayed. Those who do not abide by the cultural customs are less likely to be trusted. A passage from Weber (1986) summarizes them:

1. (Only) one's experience is reliable.
2. Avoid unnecessary risk by assuming responsibility for information of which one is not absolutely certain.
3. Do not be gullible. There are many folktales in which the villain is foiled by his gullibility.
4. Assume responsibility only if it is safe to do so. Successful assumption of responsibility builds stature in the community.

Evidentials also show that being precise and stating the source of one's information is important in the language and the culture. Failure to use them correctly can lead to diminished standing in the community. Speakers are aware of the evidentials and even use proverbs to teach children the importance of being precise and truthful. Precision and information source are of importance. They are a method of human communication.

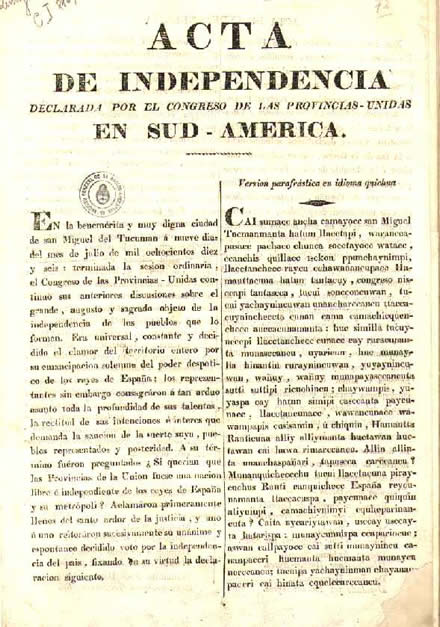
Act of Argentine Independence, written in Spanish and Quechua (1816)

== Literature ==
As in the case of the pre-Columbian Mesoamerica, there are a number of Andean texts in the local language which were written down in Latin characters after the European conquest, but which express, to a great extent, the culture of pre-Conquest times. For example, Quechua poems thought to date from Inca times are preserved as quotations within some Spanish-language chronicles dealing with the pre-Conquest period. However, the most important specimen of Quechua literature of this type is the so-called Huarochirí Manuscript (1598), which describes the mythology and religion of the valley of Huarochirí and has been compared to "an Andean Bible" and to the Mayan Popol Vuh. From the post-conquest period (starting from the middle of the 17th century), there are a number of anonymous or signed Quechua dramas, some of which deal with the Inca era, while most are on religious topics and of European inspiration. The most famous dramas are Ollantay and the plays describing the death of Atahualpa. Juan de Espinosa Medrano wrote several dramas in the language. Poems in Quechua were also composed during the colonial period. A notable example are the works of Juan Wallparrimachi, a participant in the Bolivian War of Independence.

As for Christian literature, as early as 1583, the Third Provincial Church Council of Lima, which took place in 1583, published a number of texts dealing with Christian doctrine and rituals, including a trilingual catechism in Spanish, Quechua and Aymara and a number of other similar texts in the years from 1584 to 1585. More texts of this type were published until the middle of the 17th century, mostly adhering to a Quechua literary standard that had been codified by the Third Council for this purpose. There is at least one Quechuan version of the Bible.

Dramas and poems continued to be written in the 19th and especially in 20th centuries as well; in addition, in the 20th century and more recently, more prose has been published. However, few literary forms were made present in the 19th century as European influences limited literary criticism. While some of that literature consists of original compositions (poems and dramas), the bulk of 20th century Quechua literature consists of traditional folk stories and oral narratives. Johnny Payne has translated two sets of Quechua oral short stories, one into Spanish and the other into English.

Demetrio Túpac Yupanqui wrote a Quechuan version of Don Quixote, under the title Yachay sapa wiraqucha dun Qvixote Manchamantan.

== Media ==
A news broadcast in Quechua, "Ñuqanchik" (all of us), began in Peru in 2016.

Many Andean musicians write and sing in their native languages, including Quechua and Aymara. Notable musical groups are Los Kjarkas, Kala Marka, J'acha Mallku, Savia Andina, Wayna Picchu, Wara, Alborada, Uchpa, and many others.

There are several Quechua and Quechua-Spanish bloggers, as well as a Quechua language podcast.

The 1961 Peruvian film Kukuli was the first film to be spoken in the Quechua language.

In the 1977 science fiction film Star Wars, the alien character Greedo speaks a simplified form of Quechua.

The first-person shooter game Overwatch features a Peruvian character, Illari, with some voice lines being in Quechua.

The science-fiction show Pluribus features a Peruvian character, Kusimayu, who speaks Quechua in the Season 1 finale.

== See also ==
- Languages of Peru
- Andes
- Quechua People
- Aymara language
- List of English words of Quechuan origin
- Quechuan and Aymaran spelling shift
- South Bolivian Quechua
- Sumak Kawsay
- International Mother Language Day
- Intercultural bilingual education
- List of English words from Indigenous languages of the Americas
- Indigenous languages of the Americas

== Sources ==
- Rolph, Karen Sue. Ecologically Meaningful Toponyms: Linking a lexical domain to production ecology in the Peruvian Andes. Doctoral Dissertation, Stanford University, 2007.
- Adelaar, Willem F. H (2004-06-10). The Languages of the Andes. Cambridge University Press. ISBN 978-1-139-45112-3. Archived from the original on 2024-05-26.
- Adelaar, Willem. The Languages of the Andes. With the collaboration of P.C. Muysken. Cambridge language survey. Cambridge University Press, 2007, ISBN 978-0-521-36831-5
- Cerrón-Palomino, Rodolfo. Lingüística Quechua, Centro de Estudios Rurales Andinos 'Bartolomé de las Casas', 2nd ed. 2003
- Cole, Peter. "Imbabura Quechua", North-Holland (Lingua Descriptive Studies 5), Amsterdam 1982.
- Cusihuamán, Antonio, Diccionario Quechua Cuzco-Collao, Centro de Estudios Regionales Andinos "Bartolomé de Las Casas", 2001, ISBN 978-9972-691-36-2
- Cusihuamán, Antonio, Gramática Quechua Cuzco-Collao, Centro de Estudios Regionales Andinos "Bartolomé de Las Casas", 2001, ISBN 978-9972-691-37-9
- Mannheim, Bruce, The Language of the Inka since the European Invasion, University of Texas Press, 1991, ISBN 978-0-292-74663-3
- Rodríguez Champi, Albino. (2006). Quechua de Cusco. Ilustraciones fonéticas de lenguas amerindias, ed. Stephen A. Marlett. Lima: SIL International y Universidad Ricardo Palma. Lengamer.org Archived 2018-12-21 at the Wayback Machine
- Aikhenvald, Alexandra. Evidentiality. Oxford: Oxford UP, 2004. Print.
- Floyd, Rick. The Structure of Evidential Categories in Wanka Quechua. Dallas, TX: Summer Institute of Linguistics, 1999. Print.
- Hintz, Diane. "The evidential system in Sihuas Quechua: personal vs. shared knowledge" The Nature of Evidentiality Conference, The Netherlands, 14–16 June 2012. SIL International. Internet. 13 April 2014.
- Lefebvre, Claire, and Pieter Muysken. Mixed Categories: Nominalizations in Quechua. Dordrecht, Holland: Kluwer Academic, 1988. Print.
- Weber, David. "Information Perspective, Profile, and Patterns in Quechua." Evidentiality: The Linguistic Coding of Epistemology. Ed. Wallace L. Chafe and Johanna Nichols. Norwood, NJ: Ablex Pub, 1986. 137–55. Print.
