= Southern Quechua =

Indigenous language of the central Andes of South America

- Quechua II-C, Urin
- Urin Qhichwa
- Pronunciation: [qʰɛtʃwa]
- Native to: Peru, Bolivia, Chile and Argentina
- Region: Countries of the Andean highlands of South America, minorities in neighboring countries and some parts of Asia and Europe
- Ethnicity: In the Andes: Quechua · Diaguita · Qulla; In Santiago: Lule · Vilela · Tonocotés · Spaniards
- Native speakers: (5 million cited 1987–2014)
- Language family: Quechuan: Quechua II; Quechua IIC; Southern Quechua
- Early form: Classical Quechua
- Dialects: Ayacucho; Cusco; Puno (Collao); North Bolivian; South Bolivian; Santiagueño; Catamarca and La Rioja †
- Writing system: Latin script (Quechua alphabet)

Official status
- Official language in: Bolivia; Peru; Argentina (regional)
- Recognised minority language in: Chile

Language codes
- ISO 639-3: Variously: qwc – Classical Quechua quy – Ayacucho Quechua qxu – Arequipa-La Unión Quechua quz – Cusco Quechua qve – Eastern Apurímac Quechua qxp – Puno Quechua (Collao) qul – North Bolivian Quechua (Apolo) quh – South Bolivian Quechua qus – Santiagueño Quechua
- Glottolog: quec1389
- ELP: Catamarca and La Rioja Quechua (extinct variety in Argentina)
- Linguasphere: 84-FAA-h
- Majority of Southern Quechua speakers Minority of Southern Quechua speakers

- People: Qulla
- Language: Qhichwa
- Country: Qullaw

Southern Quechua (Quechua: Urin qhichwa, Spanish: quechua sureño), or simply Quechua (Qichwa or Qhichwa), is the most widely spoken of the major regional groupings of mutually intelligible dialects within the Quechua language family, with about 6.9 million speakers. Besides Guaraní, it is the only indigenous language of the Americas with more than 5 million speakers. The term Southern Quechua refers to the Quechuan varieties spoken in regions of the Andes south of a line roughly east–west between the cities of Huancayo and Huancavelica in central Peru. It includes the Quechua varieties spoken in the regions of Ayacucho, Cusco and Puno in Peru, in much of Bolivia and parts of north-west Argentina. The most widely spoken varieties are Cusco, Ayacucho, Puno (Collao), and South Bolivian.

In the traditional classification of the Quechua language family by Alfredo Torero, Southern Quechua is equivalent to Torero's 'Quechua IIc' (or just 'QIIc'). It thus stands in contrast to its many sister varieties within the wider Quechuan family that are spoken in areas north of the Huancayo–Huancavelica line: Central Quechua (Torero's QI) spoken from Huancayo northwards to the Ancash Region; North Peruvian Quechua around Cajamarca and Incahuasi (Torero's IIa); and Kichwa (part of Torero's Quechua IIb).

== Dialects ==
Dialects are Ayacucho Quechua, Cusco Quechua, Puno Quechua (Collao Quechua), North Bolivian Quechua (Apolo Quechua), and South Bolivian Quechua. Santiagueño Quechua in Argentina is divergent, and appears to derive from a mix of dialects, including South Bolivian. The Argentinian dialects of Catamarca and La Rioja are extinct.

The most salient distinction between Ayacucho Quechua and the others is that it lacks the aspirated (tʃʰ, pʰ, tʰ, kʰ, qʰ) and ejective (tʃʼ, pʼ, tʼ, kʼ, qʼ) series of stop consonants. The other varieties of Bolivia and Southern Peru taken together have been called Cusco–Collao Quechua (or "Qusqu–Qullaw"); they are not monolithic. For instance, Bolivian Quechua is morphologically distinct from Cusco and Ayacucho Quechua, while North Bolivian is phonologically quite conservative compared to both South Bolivian and Cusco so there is no bifurcation between Ayacucho and Cusco–Collao.

Santiagueño also lacks the aspirated and ejective series, but it was a distinct development in Argentina. It also maintains remnants of the Quechua s–š distinction, which has otherwise been lost from Southern Quechua, which suggests other varieties of Quechua in its background.

== Standard Quechua ==
The Peruvian linguist Rodolfo Cerrón Palomino has devised a standard orthography intended to be viable for all the different regional forms of Quechua that fall under the umbrella term Southern Quechua. It is a compromise of conservative features in the pronunciations of the various regions that speak forms of Southern Quechua. It has been accepted by many institutions in Peru and Bolivia and is also used on Wikipedia Quechua pages, and by Microsoft in its translations of software into Quechua.

Here are some examples of regional spellings different from the standard orthography:

Ayacucho	Cuzco	Standard	Translation
upyay	uhyay	upyay	"to drink"
llamkay	llank'ay	llamk'ay	"to work"
ñuqanchik	nuqanchis	ñuqanchik	"we (inclusive)"
-chka-	-sha-	-chka-	(progressive suffix)
punchaw	p'unchay	p'unchaw	"day"

In Bolivia, the same standard is used except for "j", which is used instead of "h" for the sound [h] (like in Spanish).

Sound examples for words pata, phata p'ata.

The following letters are used for the inherited Quechua vocabulary and for loanwords from Aymara:
a, ch, chh, ch', h, i, k, kh, k', l, ll, m, n, ñ, p, ph, p', q, qh, q', r, s, t, th, t', u, w, y.

Instead of "sh" (appearing in the northern and central Quechua varieties), "s" is used.
Instead of "ĉ" (appearing in the Quechua varieties of Junín, Cajamarca, and Lambayeque), "ch" is used.

The following letters are used in loanwords from Spanish and other languages (not from Aymara):
b, d, e, f, g, o.

The letters e and o are not used for native Quechua words because the corresponding sounds are simply allophones of i and u that appear predictably next to q, qh, and q'. This rule applies to the official Quechua orthography for all varieties. Thus, the spellings ⟨qu⟩ and ⟨qi⟩ are pronounced [qo] and [qe].

The letters appear, however, in proper names or words adopted directly from Spanish:
c, v, x, z; j (in Peru; in Bolivia, it is used instead of h).

== Phonology ==
=== Consonants ===
Consonant phonemes
		Bilabial	Dental/ Alveolar	Palatal/ Postalveolar	Velar	Uvular	Glottal
Nasal		m	n	ɲ	ŋ	ɴ	
Plosive	voiceless	p	t	t͡ʃ	k	q	
Plosive	aspirated	pʰ	tʰ	t͡ʃʰ	kʰ	qʰ	
Plosive	ejective	pʼ	tʼ	t͡ʃʼ	kʼ	qʼ	
Fricative			s	ʃ, ʒ		χ	h
Approximant	median			j	w		
Approximant	lateral		l	ʎ			
Tap			ɾ				

=== Vowels ===
Vowel phonemes
	Front	Central	Back
Close	i, iː		u, uː
Close-mid	eː		oː
Mid		ə	
Open-mid	ɛ		ɔ
Open		a, aː	

== Grammar ==
=== Morphological type ===
Quechua is an agglutinating language, meaning that words are built up from basic roots followed by several suffixes, each of which carry one meaning. Their large number of suffixes changes both the overall meaning of words and their subtle shades of meaning. All varieties of Quechua are very regular agglutinative languages, as opposed to isolating or fusional ones [Thompson]. Their normal sentence order is SOV (subject–object–verb). Notable grammatical features include bipersonal conjugation (verbs agree with both subject and object), evidentiality (indication of the source and veracity of knowledge), a set of topic particles, and suffixes indicating who benefits from an action and the speaker's attitude toward it, but some varieties may lack some of the characteristics.

=== Pronouns ===
Number
Singular
Plural
Person
First
Ñuqa
Ñuqanchik (inclusive)

Ñuqayku (exclusive)

Second
Qam
Qamkuna
Third
Pay
Paykuna

In Quechua, there are seven pronouns. First-person plural pronouns (equivalent to "we") may be inclusive or exclusive, which means, respectively, that the addressee ("you") is and is not part of the "we". Quechua also adds the suffix -kuna to the second and third person singular pronouns qam and pay to create the plural forms, qam-kuna and pay-kuna.

=== Adjectives ===
Adjectives in Quechua are always placed before nouns. They lack gender and number and are not declined to agree with substantives.

=== Numbers ===
- Cardinal numbers. ch'usaq (0), huk (1), iskay (2), kimsa (3), tawa (4), pichqa (5), suqta (6), qanchis (7), pusaq (8), isqun (9), chunka (10), chunka hukniyuq (11), chunka iskayniyuq (12), iskay chunka (20), pachak (100), waranqa (1,000), hunu (1,000,000), lluna (1,000,000,000,000).
- Ordinal numbers. To form ordinal numbers, the word ñiqin is put after the appropriate cardinal number (iskay ñiqin = "second"). The only exception is that, in addition to huk ñiqin ("first"), the phrase ñawpaq is also used in the somewhat more restricted sense of "the initial, primordial, the oldest".

=== Nouns ===
Noun roots accept suffixes that indicate person (defining of possession, not identity), number, and case. In general, the personal suffix precedes that of number. In the Santiago del Estero variety, however, the order is reversed. From variety to variety, suffixes may change.

Examples using the word wasi (house)
Function		Suffix	Example	(translation)
suffix indicating number	plural	-kuna	wasikuna	houses
possessive suffix	1.person singular	-y, -:	wasiy, wasii	my house
possessive suffix	2.person singular	-yki	wasiyki	your house
possessive suffix	3.person singular	-n	wasin	his/her/its house
possessive suffix	1.person plural (incl)	-nchik	wasinchik	our house (incl.)
possessive suffix	1.person plural (excl)	-y-ku	wasiyku	our house (excl.)
possessive suffix	2.person plural	-yki-chik	wasiykichik	your (pl.) house
possessive suffix	3.person plural	-n-ku	wasinku	their house
suffixes indicating case	nominative	–	wasi	the house (subj.)
suffixes indicating case	accusative	-(k)ta	wasita	the house (obj.)
suffixes indicating case	instrumental	-wan	wasiwan	with the house, and the house
suffixes indicating case	abessive	-naq	wasinaq	without the house
suffixes indicating case	dative	-paq	wasipaq	to the house
suffixes indicating case	genitive	-p(a)	wasip(a)	of the house
suffixes indicating case	causative	-rayku	wasirayku	because of the house
suffixes indicating case	benefactive	-paq	wasipaq	for the house
suffixes indicating case	locative	-pi	wasipi	at the house
suffixes indicating case	directional	-man	wasiman	towards the house
suffixes indicating case	inclusive	-piwan, puwan	wasipiwan, wasipuwan	including the house
suffixes indicating case	terminative	-kama, -yaq	wasikama, wasiyaq	up to the house
suffixes indicating case	transitive	-(rin)ta	wasinta	through the house
suffixes indicating case	ablative	-manta, -piqta	wasimanta, wasipiqta	off/from the house
suffixes indicating case	comitative	-(ni)ntin	wasintin	along with the house
suffixes indicating case	immediate	-raq	wasiraq	first the house
suffixes indicating case	intrative	-pura	wasipura	among the houses
suffixes indicating case	exclusive	-lla(m)	wasilla(m)	only the house
suffixes indicating case	comparative	-naw, -hina	wasinaw, wasihina	than the house

=== Adverbs ===
Adverbs can be formed by adding -ta or, in some cases, -lla to an adjective: allin – allinta ("good – well"), utqay – utqaylla ("quick – quickly"). They are also formed by adding suffixes to demonstratives: chay ("that") – chaypi ("there"), kay ("this") – kayman ("hither").

There are several original adverbs. For Europeans, it is striking that the adverb qhipa means both "behind" and "future" and ñawpa means "ahead, in front" and "past". Local and temporal concepts of adverbs in Quechua (as well as in Aymara) are associated to each other reversely, compared to European languages. For the speakers of Quechua, we are moving backwards into the future (we cannot see it: it is unknown), facing the past (we can see it: it is remembered).

=== Verbs ===
The infinitive forms have the suffix -y (e.g.., much'a 'kiss'; much'a-y 'to kiss'). These are the endings for the indicative:

	Present	Past	Past Habitual	Future	Pluperfect	Optative
Ñuqa	-ni	-rqa-ni	-qka-ni	-saq	-sqa-ni	-yman
Qam	-nki	-rqa-nki	-qka-nki	-nki	-sqa-nki	-nki-man
Pay	-n	-rqa(-n)	-q	-nqa	-sqa	-nman
Ñuqanchik	-nchik	-rqa-nchik	-qka-nchik	-su-nchik	-sqa-nchik	-nchik-man -swan
Ñuqayku	-yku	-rqa-yku	-qka-yku	-saq-ku	-sqa-yku	-yku-man
Qamkuna	-nki-chik	-rqa-nki-chik	-qka-nki-chik	-nki-chik	-sqa-nki-chik	-nki-chik-man -waq-chik
Paykuna	-n-ku	-rqa-(n)ku	-q-ku	-nqa-ku	-sqa-ku	-nku-man

The suffixes shown in the table above usually indicate the subject; the person of the object is also indicated by a suffix (-a- for first person and -su- for second person), which precedes the suffixes in the table. In such cases, the plural suffixes from the table (-chik and -ku) can be used to express the number of the object rather than the subject.

Various suffixes are added to the stem to change the meaning. For example, -chi is a causative suffix and -ku is a reflexive suffix (example: wañuy 'to die'; wañuchiy 'to kill'; wañuchikuy 'to commit suicide'); -naku is used for mutual action (example: marq'ay 'to hug'; marq'anakuy 'to hug each other'), and -chka is a progressive, used for an ongoing action (e.g., mikhuy 'to eat'; mikhuchkay 'to be eating').

=== Grammatical particles ===
Particles are indeclinable: they do not accept suffixes. They are relatively rare, but the most common are arí 'yes' and mana 'no', although mana can take some suffixes, such as -m (manam), -raq (manaraq 'not yet') and -chu (manachu? 'or not?'), to intensify the meaning. Other particles are yaw 'hey, hi', and certain loan words from Spanish, such as piru (from Spanish pero 'but') and sinuqa (from sino 'rather').

=== Evidentiality ===
The Quechuan languages have three different morphemes that mark evidentiality. Evidentiality refers to a morpheme whose primary purpose is to indicate the source of information. In Quechuan languages, evidentiality is a three-term system: there are three evidential morphemes that mark varying levels of source information. The markers can apply to first, second, and third persons. The chart below depicts an example of these morphemes:

Evidential morphemes	-m(i)	-ch(a)	-s(i)
Meaning	Direct evidence	Inferred; conjecture	Reported; hearsay

The parentheses around the vowels indicate that the vowel can be dropped in when following an open vowel. For the sake of cohesiveness, the above forms are used to discuss the evidential morphemes. There are dialectal variations to the forms. The variations will be presented in the following descriptions.

== See also ==
- Quechuan and Aymaran spelling shift

== Bibliography ==
- Rodolfo Cerrón-Palomino (1994). Quechua sureño, diccionario unificado quechua–castellano, castellano–quechua [Southern Quechua, Quechua–Spanish, Spanish–Quechua Unified Dictionary]. Lima, Biblioteca Nacional del Perú.
- Óscar Chávez Gonzales (2017). Urin Qichwa. Siminchik allin qillqanapaq: chankakunapaq qullawkunapaqwan. Lima, Editorial Textos. 72 pp., ISBN 9786124686832
- César Itier (2017). Diccionario Quechua Sureño – Castellano. Lima, Editorial Commentarios. 303 pp., 3900 entries, ISBN 9789972947094

Indigenous languages of the Americas with Wikipedia
Item	Label/en	native label	Code	distribution map	number of speakers, writers, or signers	UNESCO language status	Ethnologue language status	?itemwiki
Q36806	Southern Quechua	qu:Urin Qichwa qu:Qhichwa qu:Qichwa	qu		6000000	2 vulnerable		Quechua Wikipedia
Q35876	Guarani	gn:Avañe'ẽ	gn		4850000	1 safe	1 National	Guarani Wikipedia
Q4627	Aymara	ay:Aymar aru	ay		4000000	2 vulnerable		Aymara Wikipedia
Q13300	Nahuatl	nah:Nawatlahtolli nah:nawatl nah:mexkatl	nah		1925620	2 vulnerable		Nahuatl Wikipedia
Q891085	Wayuu	guc:Wayuunaiki	guc		300000	2 vulnerable	5 Developing	Wayuu Wikipedia
Q33730	Mapudungun	arn:Mapudungun	arn		300000	3 definitely endangered	6b Threatened	Mapuche Wikipedia
Q13310	Navajo	nv:Diné bizaad nv:Diné	nv		169369	2 vulnerable	6b Threatened	Navajo Wikipedia
Q25355	Greenlandic	kl:Kalaallisut	kl		56200	2 vulnerable	1 National	Greenlandic Wikipedia
Q29921	Inuktitut	ike-cans:ᐃᓄᒃᑎᑐᑦ iu:Inuktitut	iu		39770	2 vulnerable		Inuktitut Wikipedia
Q33388	Cherokee	chr:ᏣᎳᎩ ᎧᏬᏂᎯᏍᏗ chr:ᏣᎳᎩ	chr		12300	4 severely endangered	8a Moribund	Cherokee Wikipedia
Q33390	Cree	cr:ᐃᔨᔨᐤ ᐊᔨᒧᐎᓐ' cr:nēhiyawēwin	cr		10875; 8040			Cree Wikipedia
Q32979	Choctaw	cho:Chahta anumpa cho:Chahta	cho		9200	2 vulnerable	6b Threatened	Choctaw Wikipedia
Q56590	Atikamekw	atj:Atikamekw Nehiromowin atj:Atikamekw	atj		6160	2 vulnerable	5 Developing	Atikamekw Wikipedia
Q27183	Iñupiaq	ik:Iñupiatun	ik		5580	4 severely endangered		Inupiat Wikipedia
Q523014	Muscogee	mus:Mvskoke	mus		4300	3 definitely endangered	7 Shifting	Muscogee Wikipedia
Q33265	Cheyenne	chy:Tsêhesenêstsestôtse	chy		2400	3 definitely endangered	8a Moribund	Cheyenne Wikipedia
