= Ayacucho Quechua =

Dialect of the Southern Quechua language in Peru

- Chanka runasimi
- Native to: Peru
- Native speakers: (918,200 cited 2000)
- Language family: Quechuan: Quechua II; Southern Quechua; Ayacucho Quechua

Language codes
- ISO 639-3: Either: quy – Ayacucho qxu – Arequipa–La Unión
- Glottolog: ayac1238
- ELP: Ayacucho Quechua

Ayacucho (also called Chanca or Chanka after the local Chanka ethnicity that dominated the area before the Inca conquest) is a variety of Southern Quechua spoken in the Ayacucho Region, Peru, as well as by immigrants from Ayacucho in Lima. With roughly a million speakers, it is the largest variety of Southern Quechua after Cusco Quechua. The literary standard of Southern Quechua is based on these two closely related Quechua varieties.

== Phonology ==
=== Vowels ===
	Front	Back
High	i	u
Mid	e (Note: Loanword letter)	o
Low	a	

Ayacucho Quechua has three vowels: /a/, /i/, and /u/, which are rendered by native speakers as [æ], [ɪ], and [ʊ] respectively. When these vowels appear adjacent to the uvular fricative /χ/, they are lowered (with [æ] instead being produced further back), yielding [ɑ], [ɛ], and [ɔ] respectively. In bilingual speakers, the Spanish realizations [a], [i], and [u] may also be found.

=== Consonants ===
The consonant phonemes of Ayacucho Quechua are outlined below. Orthographic symbols at odds with the IPA are given in angle brackets.

Ayacucho Quechua consonant phonemes
	Labial	Alveolar	Palatal	Velar	Uvular	Glottal
Stop	p / b (Note: Loanword letter)	t / d		k / g		
Affricate			tʃ ⟨ch⟩			
Fricative	f	s			χ ⟨q⟩	h
Nasal	m	n	ɲ ⟨ñ⟩			
Lateral		l	ʎ ⟨ll⟩			
Trill		r				
Glide		ɹ ⟨rr⟩	j ⟨y⟩	w		

Notable differences from Cusco Quechua:

- There are no ejective stops. See Cusco Phonology for examples of ejective consonants.
- ⟨q⟩ represents the uvular fricative /χ/ rather than the uvular stop /q/ of Cusco. The ⟨q⟩ grapheme is kept merely to allow for easy comparison due to its use with other Quechua languages.
- Ayacucho Quechua lacks the characteristic spirantization of stops at the end of a syllable; compare Cusco ñuqanchis with Ayacucho ñuqanchik 'we/you and I'.

Ayacucho Quechua has borrowed hundreds of words from Spanish, and some speakers (even monolinguals) approximate the Spanish pronunciation. For such speakers, /f/ /r/ /b/ /d/ /ɡ/ /e/ /o/ are phonemes in borrowed words like libru (from Spanish libro 'book') or serbey (from Spanish servir 'to serve')

=== Stress rules and syllable structure ===
Quechua primary (strong) stress regularly falls on the penultimate syllable (if a word has more than one syllable). It may also occur on the final syllable, in which case it is directly indicated by the acute diacritic. In slow speech, weak stress tends to fall on the first syllable of a word.

All phonemes appear in word initial position, though vowel clusters are not allowed, and word initial consonant clusters occur only in words borrowed from Spanish (these clusters are bl-, br-, bw-, by-, pl-, pr-, pw-, py-, dy, dr-, ty-, tr-, gr-, gl-, gw-, kr-, kl-, kw-, fr-, fl-, sp-, sk-, "st"-, "sw"- and sy-). The consonants h, l, and ñ cannot occur in word-final position (as well as borrowed Spanish consonants b, g, and f). This leads to a minimal possible syllable of V (only word initially) and a maximal native syllable of CVC ñan (with the prohibited consonants unable to appear in the final position), and a maximal possible syllable of CCVC kreyey (from Spanish creer 'to believe').

== Morphology ==
=== Substantive morphology ===
==== Overview ====
Quechua is a largely agglutinative language and nouns can be modified by many affixes (mostly suffixes) which can mark the case of a noun or derive a new word. Some suffixes are possible in combination, such as -pa + -ta, ñuqapata, 'to my place'. Pronouns are marked with the same suffixes as regular nouns, as in -ñuqa 'I', -ñuqa-pa 'my'.

==== Personal pronouns ====
	Singular	Plural	
1st person	ñuqa	ñuqanchik	ñuqayku
2nd person	qam	qamkuna	
3rd person	pay	paykuna	

The first person plural pronouns Ayacucho Quechua are divided into inclusive and exclusive pairs. Ñuqanchik, the inclusive pronoun, means 'we' and includes the person to whom the speaker is talking, as in 'you and I'. The exclusive pronoun, ñuqayku, also means 'we', but does not include the listener, meaning approximately 'we but not you'.

==== Case marking ====
Ayacucho Quechua substantives are marked for eleven grammatical cases, which are also conveyed through the use of suffixes. These suffixes may be placed onto nouns, numerals, pronouns, and—with an adverbial meaning—on adjectives and adverbs.

- -ta marks the object or goal of a transitive verb. This includes the direct object in sentences like wasita qawan 'he watches the house'. It also has an adverbial function with adjectives (e.g. allin 'good' → allinta 'well'), numbers in telling time, adverbs, and adverbial nouns (e.g. punchaw 'day' → punchawta 'by day').
- -pi marks location in, on, at, or within the noun to which it is attached (e.g. wasipi 'in the house'). When attached to an adverbial noun, -pi acquires the meaning 'during', as in setembripi 'during September'. When suffixed to a nominalized verbal, it means 'while', as in suyasqampi 'while he waited'. Additionally, -pi can be affixed to adjectives to indicate an adverbial function (e.g. katulikapi kasarakunqa 'they'll get married in a Catholic church').
- -pa marks the genitive case (e.g. wasipa 'the house's; of the house'. A number of adverbials can also be formed from nouns + -pa (e.g. waqta 'side' → waqtapa 'on its side, sideways'.
- -man means almost the same as -ta but is related to movement (e.g. wasiman rin 'he goes to the house'). It marks the direction towards a noun for a non-human actor (e.g. kay ñanmi ayakuchuman riq 'this road goes to Ayacucho').
- -manta (which is not composed of the individual suffixes -man and -ta) marks motion away from a noun (e.g. wasimanta 'from the house'). It is also used for a number of other relational meanings such as 'about', 'instead of', or 'made of' (e.g. firumantam 'made of iron'; wasimanta riman 'he speaks about the house').
- -wan marks accompaniment (as in ñuqawanmi rin 'he goes with me'), or indicates the means by which an action is performed (as in lampawan llamkachkan, 'he is working with the hoe').
- -paq indicates the beneficiary of an action, as in amikumpaqmi rimapunqa, 'he'll speak on behalf of his friend'). When attached to a verbal, it means 'about to', as in mikuypaq kachkan, 'he is about to eat'.
- -rayku indicates causality (e.g. ñuqarayku 'because of me'; munasqayrayku, 'because I want to').
- -kama marks motion up to but not farther than the object (or, in the case of a verbal, passage of time until the affixed verbal), as in wasikama 'up to the house'.
- -pura indicates the location of an object among others of its kind (e.g. kikinchikpura qunakuranchik papakunta, 'we exchanged potatoes amongst ourselves').
- -nka implies equal distribution among members in a group (e.g. iskayninka* quwanchik 'he gives us two each'). This suffix appears as -ninka following a consonant.
- -kuna pluralizes the noun to which it is attached (e.g. wasikuna 'the houses'). It can be used in conjunction with other suffixes and precedes all other suffixes except the personal markers, as in wasikichikkunaman 'to your (pl.) houses'. This suffix is not obligatory and can be omitted if the meaning is clear without it, as in runa and runakuna which both mean 'people' (runa may also mean a single person).

=== Verbal morphology ===
==== Verbal conjugations ====
In contrast to the fairly simple morphology for nouns, Quechua verbal morphology is much more complex. Verbs are conjugated for person and number of both the subject and the object. Subject suffixes precede explicit object suffixes as in riku-y-ki-ku 'We see you', in which the first person -y appears before the second person -ki (ku, in this case pluralizes the first person). However, even the subject markers are preceded by the suffixes -wa and -su which indirectly convey the direct object of the verb, as in riku-wa-n-ki 'You see me'. Explicit personal markers are preceded by one of the tentatively titled "aspect" morphemes. The simple present tense is marked by the suffix -n-, apart from first-person subject and second-person object, where there is no suffix.

- Verbal suffixes
  - -y refers to the speaker. It appears as -y following a vowel, -niy following a consonant, -i following the -n- marker of the simple present, and Zero following the future ending -sqa.
  - -ki refers to the addressee, the person to whom one is speaking. It appears as -yki following /a/ or /u/, -niki following a consonant, and as -ki elsewhere.
  - -n refers to a person other than the speaker or the addressee (third person). It appears as -n following a vowel, and -nin following a consonant.
  - -chik refers to a group which includes the addressee. It -nchik following a vowel, -ninchik following a consonant, and -chik elsewhere (as when it follows the -n- morpheme).
  - -ku refers to a group which excludes the addressee. It has no allomorphy.
  - -wa indicates that the speaker is the object of second or third person action
  - -su indicates that the addressee is the object of action by the third person (when followed by the second person ending).

Below is shown the verb rikuy 'to see', fully conjugated in the simple present tense. The persons are shown accompanied by their corresponding Quechua pronouns declined into the appropriate cases. Blocks which are left empty are either instances in which the object is the same as the subject, which requires the reflexive marker -ku-, as in riku-ku-y 'I saw myself', or cases where such a statement is logically impossible, as in the intersection between a second person subject and a first person plural inclusive object, which would mean, approximately 'You helped you and I'.

	1st (ñuqata)	2nd (qamta)	3rd (payta)	1st plural (ñuqanchikta)	1st plural (ñuqaykuta)	2nd (qamkunata)	3rd (paykunata)
1st (ñuqa)		riku-y-ki	riku-n-i			riku-y-ki-chik	riku-ni
2nd (qam)	riku-wa-n-ki		riku-n-ki		riku-wa-n-ki-ku		riku-n-ki
3rd (pay)	riku-wa-n	riku-su-n-ki	riku-n	riku-wa-n-chik	riku-wa-n-ku	riku-su-n-ki-chik	riku-n
1st plural (ñuqanchik)			riku-n-chik				riku-n-chik
1st plural (ñuqayku)		riku-y-ki-ku	riku-y-ku			riku-y-ku	riku-y-ku
2nd plural (qamkuna)	riku-wa-n-ki-chik		riku-n-ki-chik		riku-wa-n-ki-ku		riku-n-ki-chik
3rd (paykuna)	riku-wa-n-ku	riku-su-n-ki-ku	riku-n-ku	riku-wa-n-chik	riku-wa-n-ku	riku-su-n-ki-chik	riku-n-ku

== Syntax ==
Ayacucho Quechua has a standard subject–object–verb (SOV) word order, as in (pay) wasitam ruwachkan 'he is building a house', but this can be inverted, since the syntactic relationship between nouns is made clear by the overt case markers. However, unlike in other case-marked languages (like Russian or Latin), the inversion of the standard word order in Ayacucho Quechua does not serve to topicalize the word (or phrase) in question since this too is explicitly marked by the -qa discourse topic marker. Primarily then, inversions of word order serve to emphasize words as particularly relevant or salient (particularly verbs). Compare standard wasita qawan 'he watches the house' with qawan wasita 'he watches the house' (as opposed to feeling it or hearing about it) in which the act of watching is being specifically highlighted.

With respect to smaller constituents, the order is much more fixed. Modifiers, such as adjectives, preadjectivals, adverbials and attributive nouns all occur before the head which they modify (including possessive nouns marked with -pa). Prepositions, when they occur, are also placed before their noun phrases.
