= North Bolivian Quechua =

Dialect of Southern Quechua

- North La Paz Quechua
- Native to: Bolivia
- Region: La Paz Department
- Native speakers: (116,000 in Bolivia cited 1978 census)
- Language family: Quechuan: Quechua II; Southern Quechua; North Bolivian Quechua

Language codes
- ISO 639-3: qul
- Glottolog: nort2976
- ELP: Northern Bolivian Quechua

North Bolivian Quechua is a dialect of the Southern Quechua language, spoken in northern Bolivia on the Peruvian border, as well as by immigrants in Peru.
