= Benefactive case =

Grammatical case

The benefactive case (abbreviated ben, or sometimes b when it is a core argument) is a grammatical case typically used where English would use "for", "for the benefit of", or "intended for." For instance, "She opened the door for Tom" or "This book is for Bob" would both be examples of benefactive case (although generally unmarked in English).

The benefactive case expresses that the referent of the noun it marks receives the benefit of the situation expressed by the clause. This meaning is often incorporated through dative case. In Latin, this type of dative is called the dativus commodi.

== Cross-linguistic examples ==
=== Basque ===
Basque has a benefactive case ending in -entzat, from the genitive -en and essive -tzat.

=== Quechua ===
Quechua is another example of a language with the benefactive case. Some researchers have argued that the benefactive and genitive cases, both marked with the ending -paq, have become indistinguishable. The following example is from Cuzco Quechua:

Pi-paq-taq chay punchu-ta-ri awa-sha-nki
Who-BEN-EMP that poncho-ACC-CNTR weave-PR-2SG
“For who are you weaving that poncho?”

=== Tangkhul-Naga ===
Tangkhul-Naga (from the Tibeto-Burman group of languages) has the benefactive case marker -wiʋaŋ. The case marker comes from the combining the genitive case marker -wùi and the suffix -vaη.

=== Aymara ===
In Aymara, the benefactive case is marked with -taki, expressing that the referent of the inflected noun benefits from the situation expressed by the verb, or, when there is no verb, that the noun to which it attaches is a recipient, as in the word below:

khuchi -ja -naka -taki -w(a)
pig -1.POSS -PL -BEN -DECL
'for my pigs'

=== Tamil ===
In Tamil, the benefactive case is shown using "உக்காக" (ukkaaka), showing that the predicate of the clause was done or intended for the inflected noun. When there is no verb, the clause means that the subject exists for the inflected noun.

For example:

Intha thosai Kannanukkaaka caeythaen.
I made this dosai for Kannan.

Benefactive meaning may also be marked on the verb, in a common type of applicative voice.

== Autobenefactive ==
An autobenefactive case marks a case where the agent and the benefactor are the same.

=== Examples ===
In Rhinelandic colloquial German, one finds expressions like:

Ich rauch mer en Zigarett.

(I smoke a cigarette for myself), where mer (for myself) is optional.

In the Colognian language, there is a compulsory autobenefactive. For example, the verb bedde (to pray) requires the benefactive when it is used intransitively:

Hä deiht sesch bedde

(He is praying).

Similarly, in French one can say, in informal but fully correct language:

Je me fume une cigarette. Je me fais une pause.

(Literally: I (to) myself smoke a cigarette. I (to) myself do a pause.)

Formally, those forms coincide with reflexives in these languages.

A similar construction is also found in colloquial English with a pronoun that is reflexive in function, but not form:

I love me some chicken.

== See also ==
- Ditransitive verb
- Malefactive case
- Genitive case
