= Quechuan and Aymaran spelling shift =

Orthography reform for indigenous place names

In recent years, Peru has revised the official spelling for place-names originating from Aymara and the Quechuan languages. A standardized alphabet for done Quechua was adopted by the Peruvian government in 1975; a revision in 1985 moved to a three-vowel orthography.

The major changes are to replace the digraph ⟨hu⟩ with the single letter ⟨w⟩, and to replace the consonants c/q[u] with either ⟨k⟩ or ⟨q⟩, as appropriate in the word in question. K and q represent different sounds in most Andean languages: k is a velar stop [k], as in Spanish and English; q is a uvular stop [q], a sound not heard in Spanish or English, (but frequently in Arabic; e.g. Quran (Koran)). As Spanish does not have uvular [q], traditional spellings lose this distinction (although sometimes a double cc was used to represent the k-like sounds of Quechua that differed from the "plain k" sound known in Spanish; e.g., in place names such as Ccarhuacc, Chopcca, Cconocc, Llacce, Manyacc, Chihuilluyocc, Chilcahuaycco, etc., and Quechua or Aymara sources must be consulted to select the right consonant. For instance, the Temple of the Sun in Cusco is called the Qurikancha in Quechua, with both sounds (quri "gold", kancha "courtyard, enclosure"), and is spelled Coricancha in hispanicized spelling.

Additionally, the phoneme inventory of Quechua and Aymara includes just three vowels, /a/, /i/, and /u/. Older Spanish transcriptions (as well as the 1975 standard) used the letters ⟨o⟩ and ⟨e⟩ as well; this is because the pronunciation of /u/ and /i/ opens to [o] and [e] adjacent to a /q/, an instance of allophonic variation. For instance, Quechua qucha 'lake' sounds to Spanish speakers like cocha, as in the sample Huiracocha below, or with Coricancha previously mentioned above. Some sources, such as dictionary published by the Academia Mayor de la Lengua Quechua, still use the five-vowel 1975 orthography.

In Bolivia and Southern Peru, including Cuzco, there are three versions of all the stop consonants: the basic unaspirated sounds (p, t, ch, k, q), an aspirated series spelled with an h (ph, th, chh, kh, qh); and finally an ejective series spelled with an apostrophe (p', t', ch', k', q'). In Aymara and Southern Quechua, these are distinct sounds, making a total of 15 stop consonants, and these differences must be shown in the spelling: in the example words below, the kh in khipu is not the same as the k in Inka or in Tiwanaku; nor is the qh sound at the start of "qhapaq" the same as the q sound at the start of "Qusqu". In most regions north of Cusco, these variants do not exist, and only the basic unaspirated sounds are used.

These changes are considered to be part of a general process of spelling standardisation and reassertion of the right of these native languages to their own spelling system appropriate for their sound systems, which are very different from that of Spanish. This accompanies a growth of pride in the Andean heritage of these countries, and moves to recover the prestige of their indigenous languages. These spelling changes are part of the official alphabets for Quechua and Aymara in Peru, Bolivia and Ecuador, though debate continues on the extent to which they are to be used when writing in Spanish.

== Regulations ==
Today the Spanish spellings are in conflict with Peruvian law. According to Article 20 of Decreto Supremo No 004-2016-MC (Supreme Decree) which approves the Regulations to Law 29735, published in the official newspaper El Peruano on July 22, 2016, adequate spellings of the toponyms in the normalized alphabets of the indigenous languages must progressively be proposed with the aim of standardizing the namings used by the National Geographic Institute (Instituto Geográfico Nacional, IGN). The IGN realizes the necessary changes in the official maps of Peru.

The following table shows examples of modern spellings of Aymara and Quechua expressions according to the normalized alphabets, their meanings and common Spanish spellings.

Aymara	Meaning	Hispanicized spellings
Ch'iyar Juqhu	ch'iyara "black", juqhu "muddy place", "black muddy place"	Chearoco, Chearaco, Chiaroco, Chiaraco
Janq'u Uma	janq'u "white", uma "water", "white water"	Ancohuma, Jankho Uma, Jankhouma
Wila Quta or Wilaquta	wila "red", quta "lake", "red lake"	Vila Cota, Wila Kkota, Wila Khota, Wila Kota, Vila Ccota, Vilaccota, Wilaccota, Wila Ccota, Vilakkota, Vilakota, Vilacota
Quechua	Meaning	Hispanicized spellings
Qiwllarahu	qiwlla "gull", rahu "snow, ice, mountain with snow", "gull mountain with snow"	Caullaraju, Jeulla Rajo, Jeulla Raju, Queulla Raju, Queullaraju
Wayna Qhapaq	wayna "young, young man", qhapaq "sovereign, the mighty one"	Huayna Capac, Huayna Cápac, Huayna Ccapacc, Guayna Capac
Wiraqucha	wira "fat", qucha "lake", wiraqucha or Wiraqucha "mister, sir, gentleman / god"	Huiracocha, Huiraccocha, Viracocha, Wiracocha

Quechuan and Aymaran Wikipedias are also a good example of using of the modern spelling.
