= Quechua =

Quechua may refer to:

- Quechua people, several Indigenous ethnic groups in South America, especially in Peru
- Quechuan languages, an Indigenous South American language family with over 7 million speakers, mostly in Peru and neighbouring countries, derived from a common ancestral language known as the Proto-Quechuan language
  - Southern Quechua, the most widespread Quechua language, with over 5 million speakers, spoken in southern Peru, Bolivia and northern Argentina
    - Ayacucho Quechua
    - Cusco Quechua
    - Puno Quechua
    - North Bolivian Quechua
    - South Bolivian Quechua
    - Santiagueño Quechua
  - Quechua I, or Central Quechua, spoken in central Peru
    - Ancash Quechua, with about 700,000 speakers
    - Alto Pativilca–Alto Marañón–Alto Huallaga Quechua
    - Yaru Quechua
    - Wanka Quechua
    - Yauyos Quechua
    - Pacaraos Quechua
  - Cajamarca–Cañaris Quechua, spoken in northern Peru
    - Cajamarca Quechua
    - Lambayeque Quechua
  - Northern Quechua, spoken in Ecuador and in neighbouring areas of Peru and Colombia
    - Kichwa language, with about 450,000 speakers
    - Chachapoyas Quechua
    - Lamas Quechua
  - Classical Quechua, historical forms of Quechua used between the 14th and 17th centuries

== Other uses ==
- Quechua (brand), a French sporting goods brand
- Quechua (geography), a natural region of Peru
- Quechua (plant), a genus of plants in the family Orchidaceae
- Quechua alphabet, orthography based on the Latin alphabet to write Quechua languages
- Quechua Wikipedia, a language edition of Wikipedia

== See also ==
- Quecha (disambiguation)
- Kʼicheʼ language
- Qʼeqchiʼ language
