= Yacolla (garment) =

Outer garment in Incan men's clothing

Yacolla was an outer garment in the Inca men's clothing that was similar to a mantle worn over the Uncu.

== Style ==
Yacolla was a square-shaped woven cloth worn over the shoulder and tied to the corners of the cloth. Yacolla was made of finer cloth when the royals wore it. "Llicilla" was a woman's mantle held together with tupu pins.

Yacolla was a part of daily clothing and also an item for grave goods.

== See also ==
- Tocapu, geometrical motifs used by Incas.
- Anaku (dress), a skirt-type draped garment of indigenous women in the Inca Empire.
- Cumbi, a fine luxurious fabric of the Inca Empire.
