= Andean textiles =

Textile tradition indigenous to South America

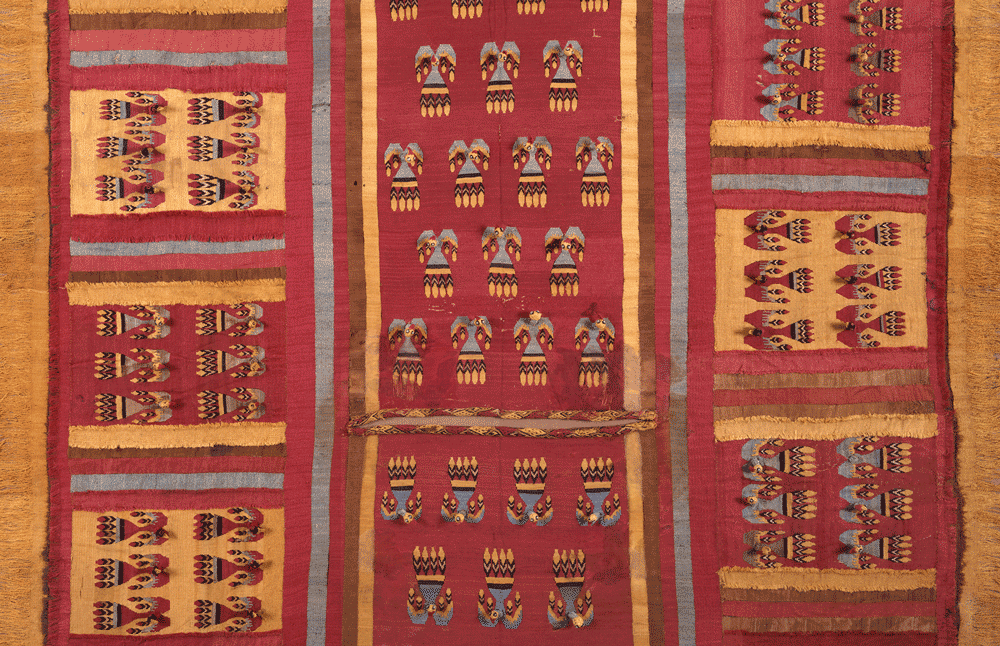
Chancay sleeved tunic with flying condors, Chancay culture, Central Coast, A.D. 1200–1400. Yale University Art Gallery, New Haven.

The Andean textile tradition spanned from the Pre-Columbian to the Colonial era throughout the western coast of South America, but was mainly concentrated in what is now Peru. The arid desert conditions along the coast of Peru have allowed for the preservation of these dyed textiles, which can date to 6000 years old. Many of the surviving textile samples were from funerary bundles, however, these textiles also encompassed a variety of functions. These functions included the use of woven textiles for ceremonial clothing or cloth armor as well as knotted fibers for record-keeping. The textile arts were instrumental in political negotiations, and were used as diplomatic tools that were exchanged between groups. Textiles were also used to communicate wealth, social status, and regional affiliation with others. The cultural emphasis on the textile arts was often based on the believed spiritual and metaphysical qualities of the origins of materials used, as well as cosmological and symbolic messages within the visual appearance of the textiles. Traditionally, the thread used for textiles was spun from indigenous cotton plants, as well as alpaca and llama wool.

== Origins ==
=== Lithic Period ===
The earliest known surviving textiles are samples of fiberwork found in Guitarrero Cave, Peru dating back to 8000 BCE. Early fiberwork by the Norte Chico civilization consisted of plant fibers that were intertwined and knotted to form baskets and other containers. Surviving examples of finely spun thread and simple cloths indicate that knowledge of spinning and weaving had already been well-established and developed in the area.

Mummified human skeletons dating to this period were stuffed with plant fibers and wrapped in rope and cane, a preservation method invented in the Chilean Chinchoros area around 5000 BC. Existence of this technology demonstrates early knowledge of spinning naturally occurring fibers into cord.

=== Pre-Ceramic Era ===
Coastal civilizations were the first to create fishnets, and were the first to utilize the openwork tradition in knotted objects. The fishnets were created through twining, a non-loom technique similar to macramé. Knotting patterns depicting standing humans, parrots, snakes, and cats have been decoded from surviving fragments.

=== Initial Period ===
The introduction of camelid herding for their meat, fibrous hair, and ability to transport cargo was developed in response to remarkably inhospitable environmental conditions found in Andean highlands. As a result, alpacas and llamas were revered for their hardiness and ability to provide resources in both life and death. The scaly fibers produced by these animals were both flexible and dye-permeable, allowing them to be woven with cotton to produce sturdy threads and textiles.

Chavín culture began to emerge around the late Initial Period (c. 900-500 BC). Surviving textiles found from looted burials feature brown dye painted on large, seamed panels of cloth. Textiles from the burials of Karwa are featured as ritual cult center objects, and depict explicitly feminine deities. The Chavín culture may have demonstrated the first extensive production of textiles for ritualistic and symbolic purposes.

Paracas culture rapidly developed the textile industry into a time-intensive and labor-consuming practice. Embroidered and woven textiles became commonplace,

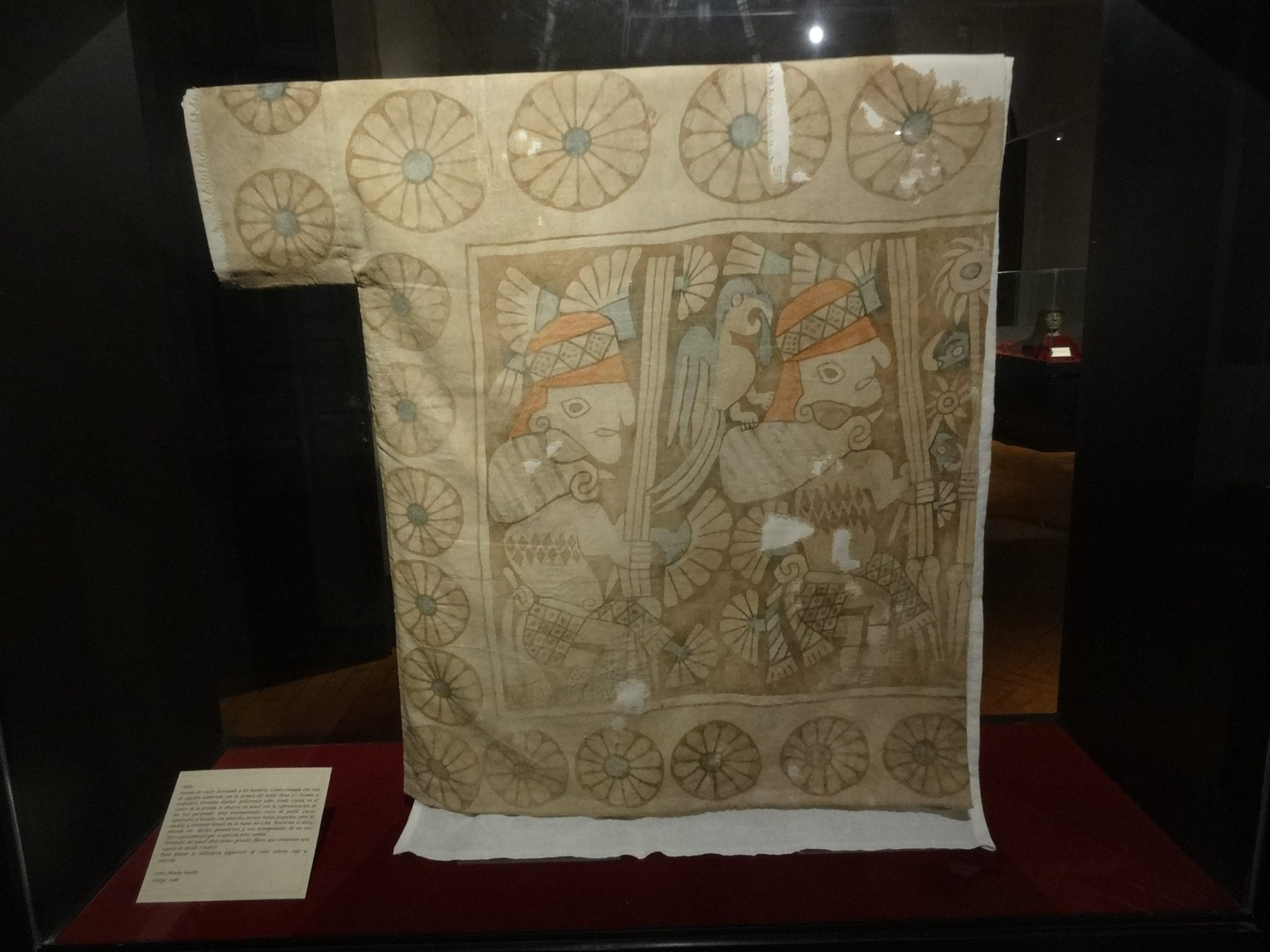
Late Moche unku shirt fragment.

featuring consistent repetition and variation of motifs. Nonwoven fabric structures, such as headbands, were created through cross-knit looping. Paracas officials adopted the practice of wearing multiple garments in sets, including headbands, turbans, mantles, ponchos, tunics, skirts, and loincloths.

The Moche wove textiles, mostly using wool from vicuña and alpaca. Although there are few surviving examples of this, descendants of the Moche people have strong weaving traditions.

=== Middle Horizon ===
The Middle Horizon is characterized by the supremacy of the Wari and Tiwanaku cultures over the central Andes.

Wari, as the former capital city was called, is located 11 km (6.8 mi) north-east of the modern city of Ayacucho, Peru. This city was the center of a civilization that covered much of the highlands and coast of modern Peru.

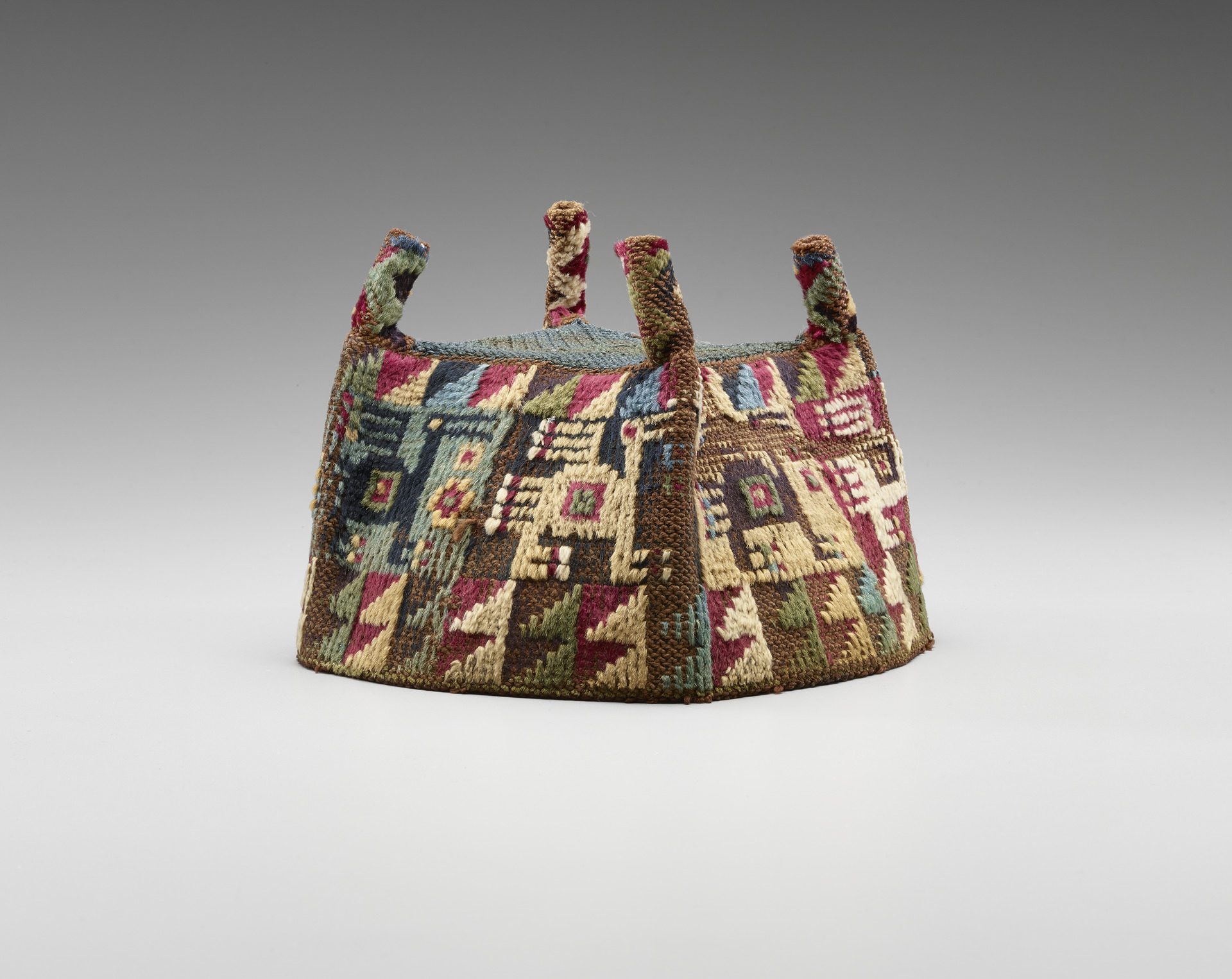
Wari wool-pile cap, 700-900 C.E., Yale University Art Gallery, New Haven.

The discovery in early 2013 of an undisturbed royal tomb, El Castillo de Huarmey, offers new insight into the social and political influence of the Wari during this period. The variety and extent of the burial items accompanying the three royal women indicate a culture with significant material wealth and the power to dominate a significant part of northern coastal Peru for many decades.^{[4]}

The Wari are particularly known for their textiles, which were well-preserved in desert burials. The standardization of textile motifs serves as artistic evidence of state control over elite art production in the Wari state.^{[7]} Surviving textiles include tapestries, hats and tunics for high-ranking officials. There are between six and nine miles of thread in each tunic, and they often feature highly abstracted versions of typical Andean artistic motifs, such as the Staff God.

Wari fiber arts featured large-scale textiles created in state-sponsored workshops. Political messages of abundance and control were depicted using chaotic geometric imagery and camelid-like figures. Examples of surviving imagery (see image) feature multiple repeating motifs of highly geometric patterns, punctuated with highly expressive color palettes. Scholars have argued that the complexity of such designs broadcast the abilities and abundances of state-controlled resources.

=== Late Intermediate Period ===
Some of the main cultures during the late intermediate period were Lambayeque, Chimor, and Chancay, late Cajamarca, Chincha, late Chachapoya, Wanka, Chanka, Qolia, Lupaca, Yaro, Warko, and others Lambayeque emerged around the 750 AD, with its peak between 900 AD and 1100. The Lambayeque style of textiles often combined the styles of earlier cultures, like the Moche and the Wari, but added its own local iconography. This led to a unique style of textile art. These earlier influences from the Wari and Moche include emphasis on narratives. However, Lambayeque's local style included motifs such as sea birds and fish, as well as crescent-shaped headdresses. The Chancay tended to have many different styles in their textiles.These styles included openwork, painted, slit tapestry, and three-dimensional figures. The Chancay textiles tended to use soft colors, which contrasts with the Chimú, who used bright, vibrant colors.

=== Late Horizon (Inca Period) ===
Inca cloth played an important role in both the social and economic foundations of the empire. Cloth production was, after agriculture, the second largest industry in the Inca Empire and was linked to social stratification.

==== Coarse Cloth – Chusi ====
The coarsest grade of Inca cloth was called chusi. Chusi was not worn, but used for basic household items such as blankets, rugs and sacking. "Individual threads used in this type of cloth were said to sometimes be as thick as a finger.

==== Standard Cloth – Awaska ====
The next grade of Inca weaving was known as awaska. Of all the ancient Peruvian textiles, this was the grade most commonly used in the production of Inca clothing. Awaska was made from llama or alpaca wool and had a much higher thread count (approximately 120 threads per inch) than that found in chusi cloth.

Thick garments made from awaska were worn as standard amongst the lower-classes of the Andean highlands, while lighter cotton clothing was produced on the warmer coastal lowlands. Peruvian Pima cotton, as used by the Incas, is still regarded as one of the finest cottons available on today’s market.

==== Textiles of Tawantinsuyu's Nobility & Royalty – Qompi ====
The finest Inca textiles were reserved for the nobility and the royalty, including the emperor himself. This cloth, known as qompi (alternative spellings cumbi or kumpi), was of exceptionally high quality and required a specialized and state-run body of dedicated workers.

Qompi cloth was produced in state-run institutions called aklla-wasi. Here, chosen women (aklla) weaved clothes for the nobility and clergy. A full-time body of male weavers, the qompi-kamayok produced qompi cloth for the state.

Qompi was made from the finest materials available to the Inca. Alpaca, particularly baby alpaca, and vicuña wool were used to create elaborate and richly decorated items. As a result of their smoothness, Inca textiles made of vicuña fiber are described as "silk" by the first Spanish explorers.

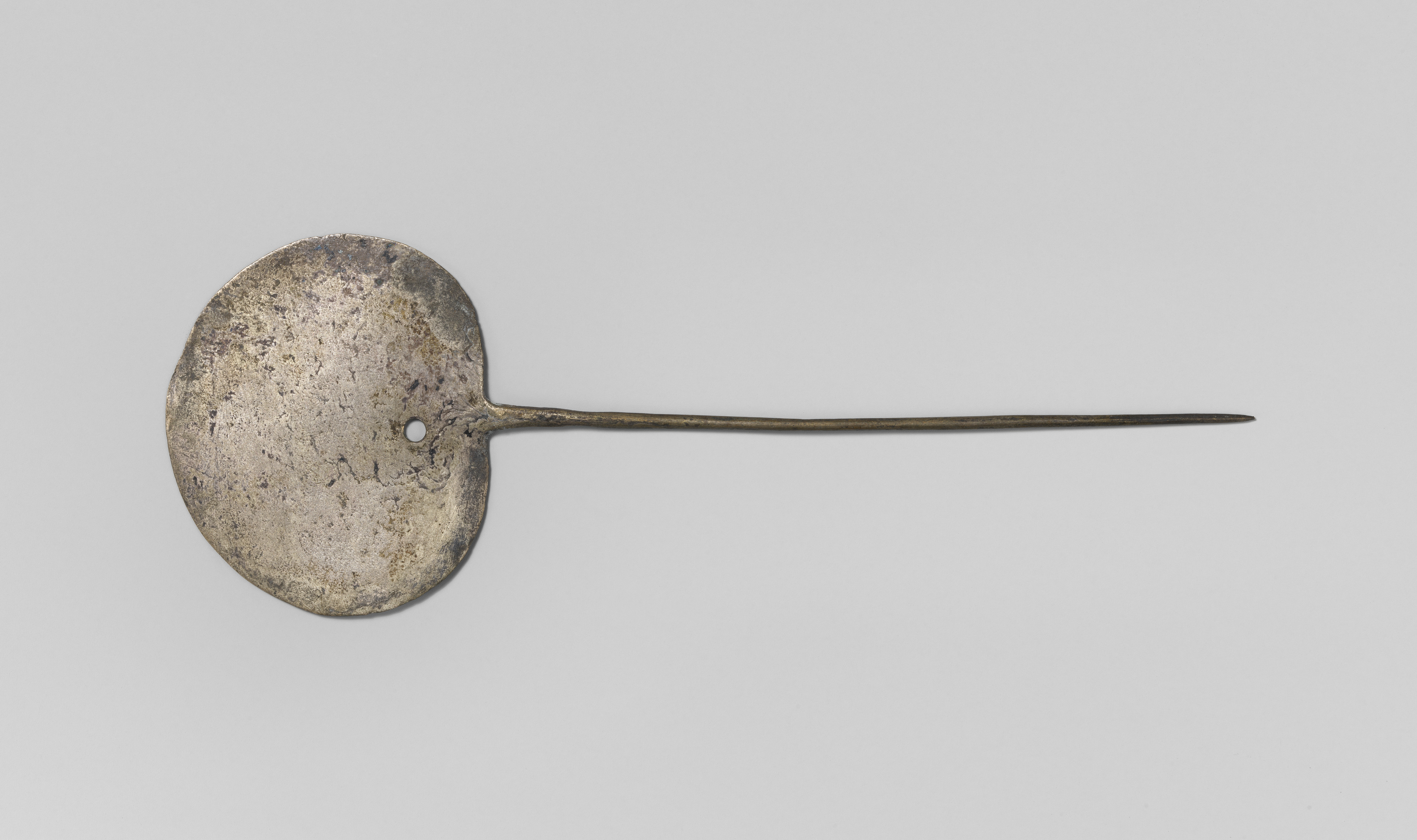
Tupu (pin) before the 17th century

Remarkably, the finest Inca cloth had a thread count of more than 600 threads per inch, higher than that found in contemporaneous European textiles and not excelled anywhere in the world until the industrial revolution in the 19th century.

==== Tawantinsuyu nationals' costume ====
The style of Inca clothing was subject to geography. Heavier, warmer materials were common in the colder Andean highlands (such as llama, alpaca and vicuna wool, the latter being worn almost exclusively by royalty), while lighter cloth was used in the warmer coastal lowlands (usually cotton). However, the basic design of Inca costume differed little throughout the Inca realm, with the quality of the materials and the value of decorative items making most of the differentiation of the social ranks.

===== Clothing Worn by Women =====
The main item of Inca clothing worn by women was a long dress known as an anaku (regional difference in style existed, with the aksu, a longer version of the male unku, being common). The anaku reached to the wearer's ankles and was held around the waist by a broad belt or sash called a chumpi.

A type of shawl or mantle, known as a lliclla, was worn over the shoulders. The mantle was fastened with tupu pins made of copper, bronze, silver, or gold. The mantle was used as a carrying device during the Inca farming process and other daily tasks. As was the case throughout the empire, the materials used in the fabrication of all these items depended upon the rank of the wearer.

===== Clothing Worn by Men =====
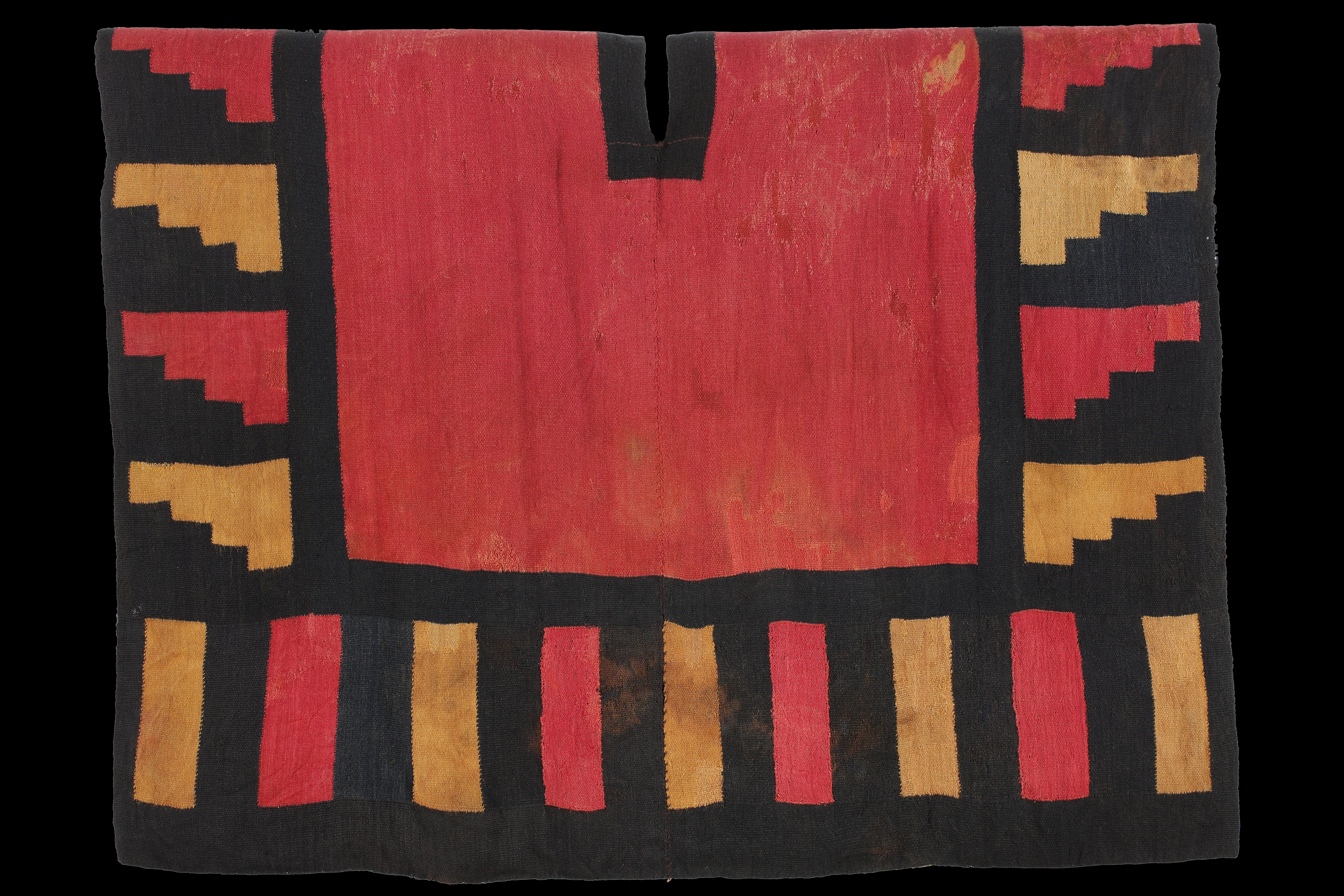
Nasca-Huari ceremonial unku of llama wool, 500 AD-700 AD.

A usually sleeveless shirt or tunic, known as an Unku (or cushma), was the main item of men's dress. The unku was commonly rectangular in form, however variations existed, the unku worn by the people of the Altiplano (Qolla, Lupaca, etc.) was rather trapezoidal for instance. The majority of the surviving examples of the unku having a width to length ratio of about 7:9. UIt was about 30 ins (76 cm) wide, reached to just above the knee in most Inca provinces (wamani), and had slits for the head and arms.

Unku varieties worn in some areas of the warmer coastal provinces were much shorter in comparison to typical Inca unku, some reached to just above the waist (resembling the proportions used by the local ancient desert people such as the Nazca-Paracas), others were hip length, both could be used in tandem with a skirt.

Inca military unku were easily identifiable by their black and white checkered design.

A great deal of recovered Inca unku (shirts and tunics) are from the coast of Peru and Chile, rather than the Andes highlands, due to the climate of the Atacama desert being much more favorable for textile preservation. Beneath this tunic was worn a breechclout or wara, a type of loincloth, it was exclusively worn by men and consisted of two rectangular strips of material that hung down from the wearer's waist. Wrapped skirts were worn in some provinces.

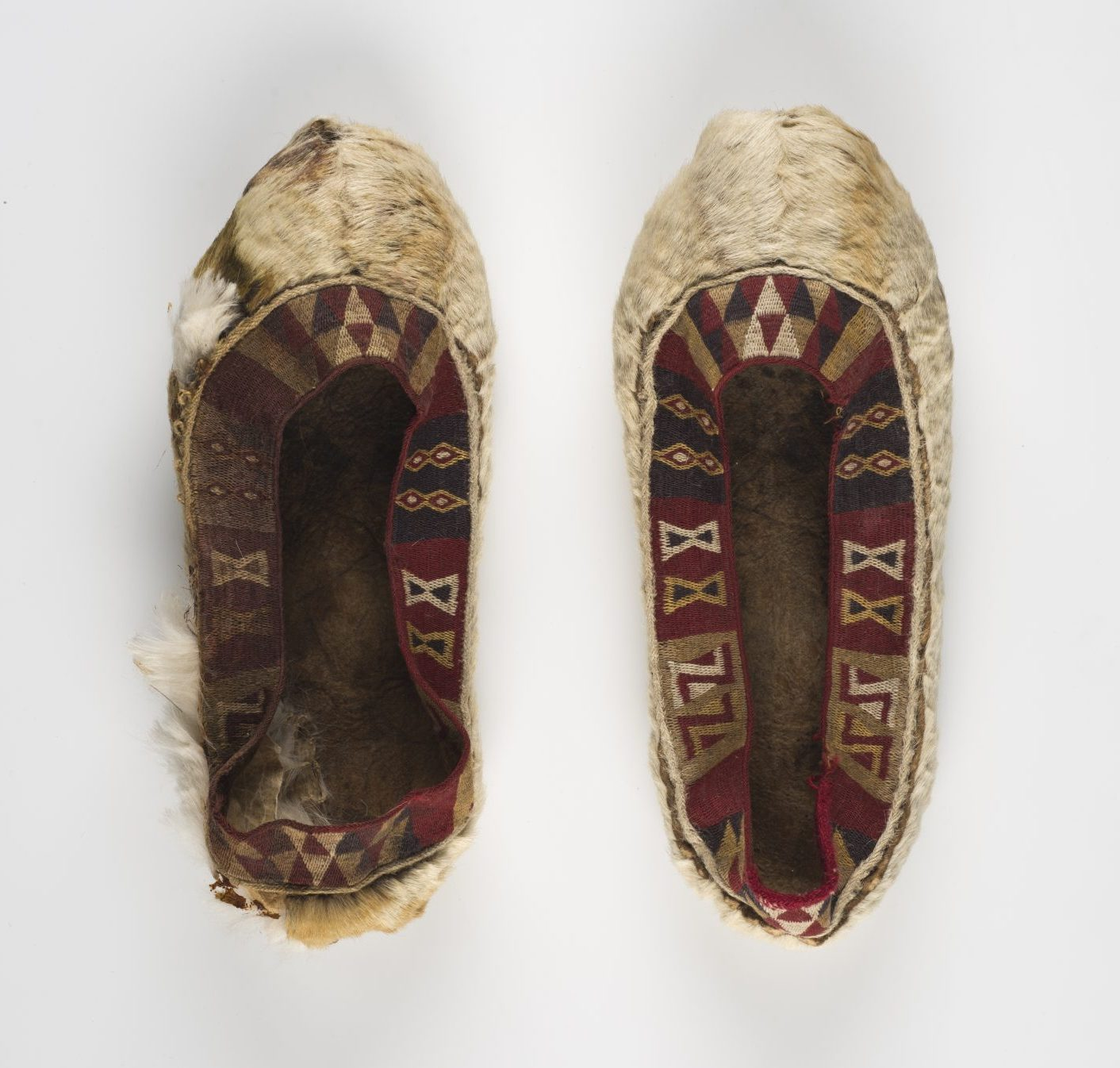
Pair of Inca shoes made of camelid wool.

An outer garment called a yakkoya (cloak) was worn over the unku. The yacolla was basically a blanket that could be thrown over the shoulders. While working, or dancing, the yacolla was tied over one shoulder to keep it in place.

Men and women often carried a woven bag known as a chuspa. The bag hung down by the wearer's side from a strap about the neck. The bag held such items as coca leaves, personal possessions, slingstones, among other things.

Male belts were much more narrow than the waistbands worn by women, and unlike women, it was not mandatory for men to wear them, nevertheless in some provinces belts seem to have been quite popular, however it appears that they did not enjoy much popularity among the ethnic-Inca nobility of Cusco, judging by the representations of themselves. A hybrid of a belt and a bag (chuspa) was very popular and commonly worn among the ethnic groups of the Altiplano in the south of the Empire.

Headdresses were very diverse in shape and form, many kinds of hats, turbans and headbands, even including things like deer antlers, slings, or cords wrapped around the head were worn. The various headdresses and head adornments indicated the place of origin of the diverse inhabitants of the Tawantinsuyu. Thus, for instance the Wanka wore a wide black headband on their heads, the Chachapoya wore wollen turbans (probably of white color), the Yungas or coastal peoples wore turbans "like those of the gypsies", while the Kana wore bonnets larger than those of the Qolla, those of Cajamarca wore slings on top of their hair.

===== Inca footwear =====
It was not uncommon, for many members of society, particularly among the lower classes but without excluding the nobility, to spend most of their time bare-footed. Several types of sandals, shoes similar in design to Native American moccasins prior to European influence, and high boots worn in the coldest areas, were the types of footwear worn by both men and women. The soles of Inca sandals could be made from leather or woven plant fibers, among other materials. The upper part of the sandal consisted of brightly colored braided woolen cord.

== Woven textiles ==
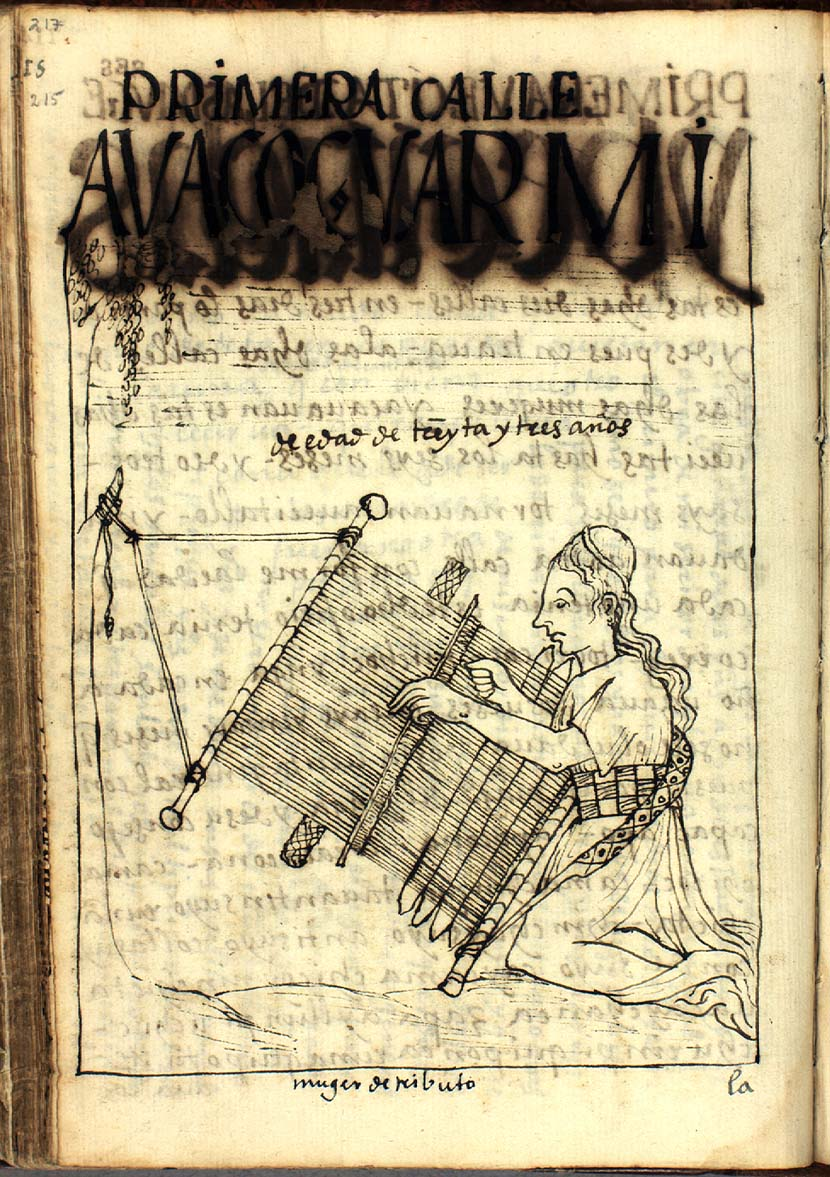
A page from the El primer nueva corónica y buen gobierno by Felipe Guaman Poma de Ayala, ca. 1600. Traditional Inca weaving, as depicted in Spanish text.

=== Manufacturing technique ===
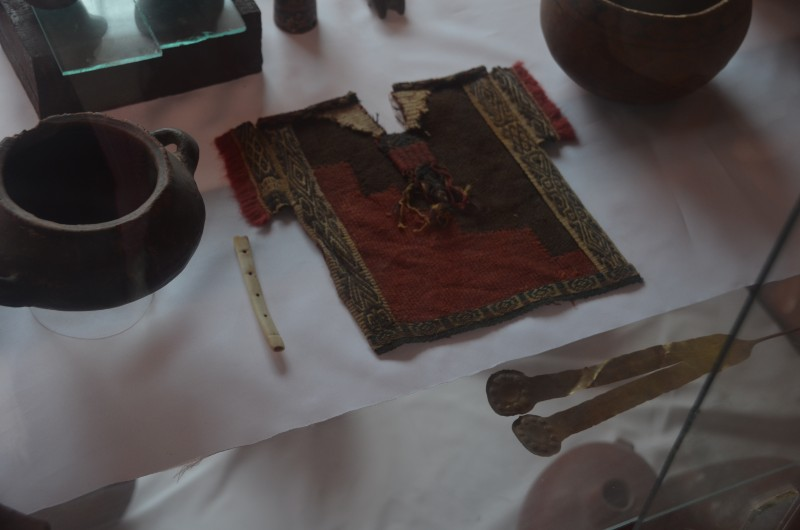
A miniature unku shirt for children.

Many textiles, such as baskets and fishing nets, did not require the use of a loom. The Andeans used the back strap loom to create woven textiles, as chronicled in El primer nueva corónica y buen gobierno. Several techniques were used to produce fabric, including plain weave, tapestry weave, and scroll weave. Smaller woven pieces produced on the same loom were often stitched together to create a larger fabric. Borders of embroidered tunics and mantles are often decorated with yarn tassels or fringe.

Prehistoric Andean weavers pioneered new weaving techniques, such as the triple weave and quadruple weave. The use of fine yarn and consistency in stitch size is remarkable, with analyses counting an average of 250 wefts per inch on average, and some samples exceeding 500 wefts per inch. This is attributed to the regularity in diameter and consistency of thread, as well as maintenance of tension on the loom throughout the entire weaving process.

A combination of cotton and dyed camelid threads contribute structural strength and colorful visual imagery to textiles. The scaly hair of camelids is permeable to dye, allowing natural plant-based dyes to be fixed to camelid fibers in the presence of a natural mordant, such as urine. Complex combinations of coloration and patterning were used to repeat geometric patterns while maintaining visual consistency; Paracas textiles are especially well known for their regular gridlike arrangement of iconographic images. The consistency of scale and shape of these patterns point to the use of counting systems used by textile artisans to record the number of stitches and distance between each geometric pattern.

=== Workshop production ===
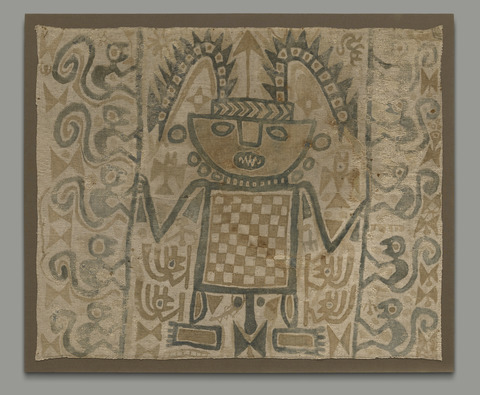
Chancay or Chimu painted textile, 800-1200 C.E., Yale University Art Gallery, New Haven.

Several different methods of embroidery are attributed to distinctive styles of coloring and depiction of images in woven textiles. Block color, linear, and broad line styles of embroidery imparted different visual effects upon the woven textile, and were used to convey different types of information. Designs were also painted directly onto woven textiles using various dyes (see figure).

Professional textile artisans in pre-Incan cultures often worked in large workshops with artisans in several specialties. Proximity to other artisans allowed for additional features to be incorporated into plain weave textiles, including metallic threads, knotted strings of feathers, and brocading. Textile painting was common practice in the preparation of special cloths for funerary bundles of high-ranking members of society. Pigments such as ochre and cinnabar have been used for painting textiles since the Early Horizon period.

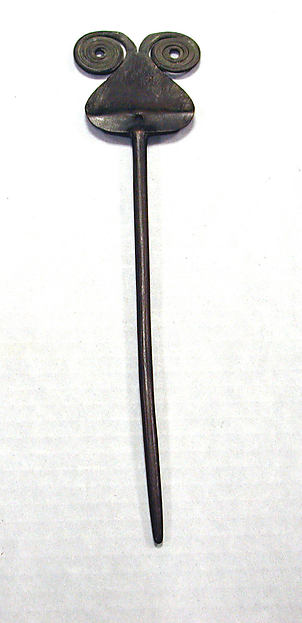
Tupu pin, 1400-1533 AD, Metropolitan Museum of Art, New York.

=== Social significance ===
Intricately woven mantles were created to be worn by nobles and elites, both in life and death. Mantles were often extensive and large, averaging 275 centimeters in length and 130 centimeters in width, and were draped around the neck and over the shoulders. Women fastened fabrics at the front of the body with a tupu, or shawl pin. The size of the mantle and foreshortening effects of imagery contributed to the appearance of the wearer as being "larger than life," serving as explicit status symbols.

Bright dyes served to distinguish social elite from those of lesser status, as undyed fabric worn by commoners was brown. Chinchero officers wore red ponchos to signify rank during formal government occasions. Inca rulers wore a llautu, or tasseled red fringe, on their forehead to demonstrate their status.

Gifts were also given to conquered territories in ceremonial shows of dominance over the peoples of the region. A region's ability to produce textiles was intricately connected to its success of camelid herding, indicating the value of state-controlled wealth in a territory.

=== Burial bundles ===
Woven garments worn during life indicated an individual's social rank, and were often interred with the individual in death. Gift textiles created expressly for funerary purposes were also interred, without being worn in life. Ritual gift objects wrapped in "mummy bundles" include obsidian knives, combs, and balls of thread.

Paracas culture practiced mummification by wrapping the deceased in several layers of woven textiles. Over 429 funeral bundles containing gift textiles, reams of plain cloth, and various ritual paraphernalia have been excavated from a necropolis at Cerro Colorado. These artifacts offer the largest source of pre-Columbian Andean textile arts known to date.

== Military use ==
While Andean civilizations had knowledge of and were capable of working metal, quilted armor was preferred for its light weight and flexibility. Soldiers depicted by Felipe Guaman Poma de Ayala wear cloth tunics and wind strips of fabric around themselves to create a sturdy armor that allowed for movement while providing defense. The use of cloth rather than metallic armor was also motivated by cultural reasons. The properties of cloth were believed to transfer spiritual reinforcement and power to its wearer, supplying strength and force.

For similar reasons, woven slings made of plant fibers were the preferred weapons of Moche civilization, rather than stiff wooden or metallic implements. Cloth blankets and tent-making equipment were readily transportable, allowing caches of resources to be delivered to battle frontiers. Storage warehouses containing cloth equipment have been excavated throughout Tawantin Suyu. Defeated armies forced to retreat often burned all cloth unable to be carried, preventing enemy forces from capturing these valuable stashes.

== Colonial Period ==
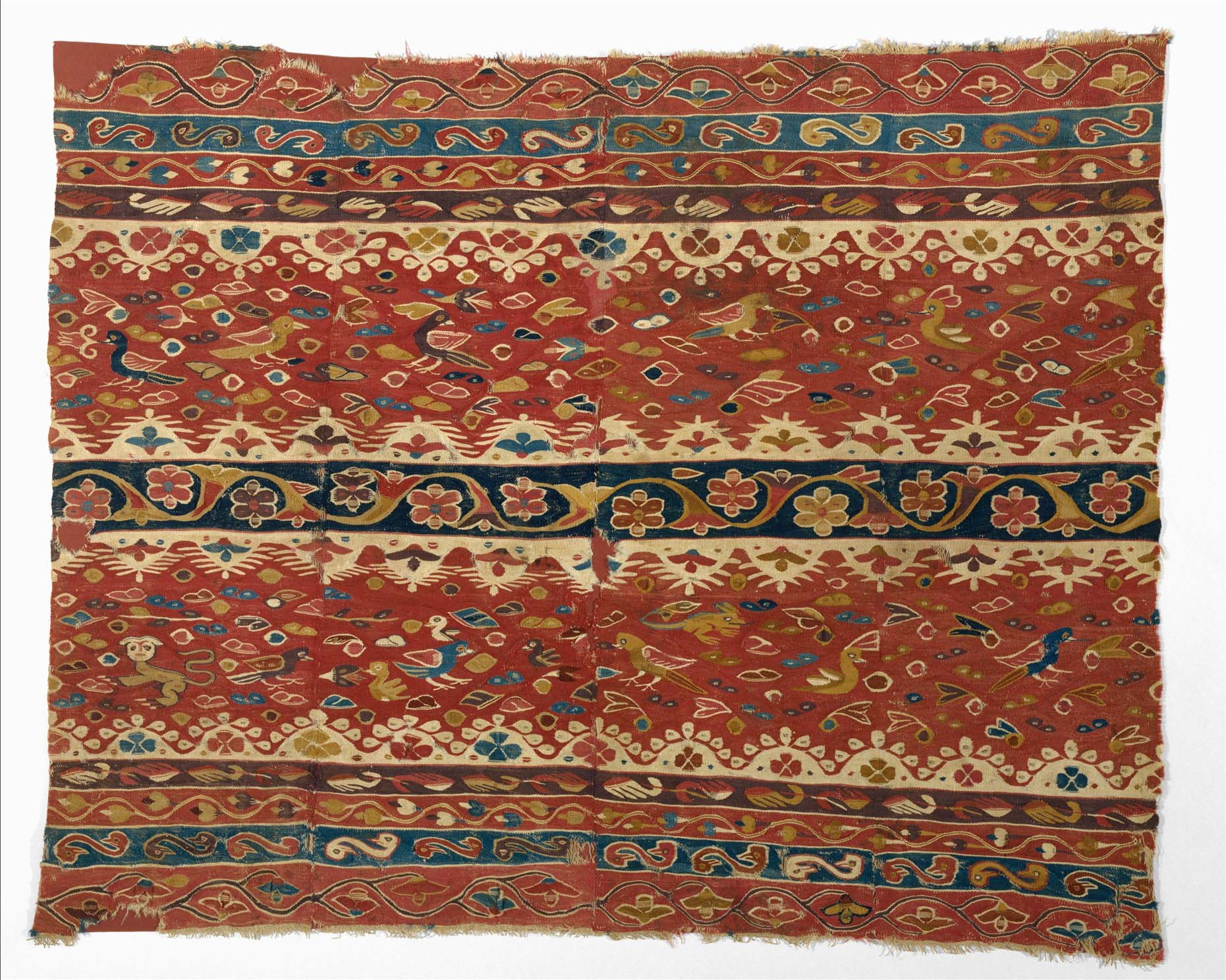
Woman's mantle, 1600-1700 C.E., Metropolitan Museum of Art, New York.

The Spanish conquest of the Inca Empire resulted in the immigration of Spanish settlers to the Andean coast. Middle- and upper-class Spanish families recognized the value of finely woven native textiles, and demanded luxury textiles to decorate their own homes. As a result, cumbi, a fine tapestry cloth woven from alpaca fibers, was modified to a Spanish color palette and produced for the homes and churches of settlers. The term tornasol refers to the style of textile absorbed by Andean weavers after the European context, characterized by a silky texture that appears to change color from different perspectives.

Native weavers modified their technique to produce common items for their colonial audience. Bedcovers, table covers, rugs, and wall hangings became popular textile formats in the late 18th century. European influences introduced lace-inspired borders and stylized circular patterns.

While garments had traditionally been brightly colored and highly patterned, the garments worn by highland Andeans during the Colonial period were characteristically plain and black. This has been interpreted as an act of mourning for the lost Inca empire, but may also be a result of cultural influence imported by arriving Spanish colonists.

In the sixteenth century, Spanish policy makers began recognizing Andean textiles as a marketable commodity. Historian Karen Graubart explains in her own work that Spanish policy makers obliged Indian women to make clothing, which would then be sold by their caciques. According to Graubart, this gender division of weaving occurred in the colonial period because Spanish policy makers assumed that Indian men would be busy with their mitas.

The main buyers of this clothing were mitayos, indigenous laborers mostly working in mining areas, and urban Indians. Employers of Indian servants and laborers bought this clothing as well because many of them guaranteed outfits in their labor contracts.

== Gallery ==
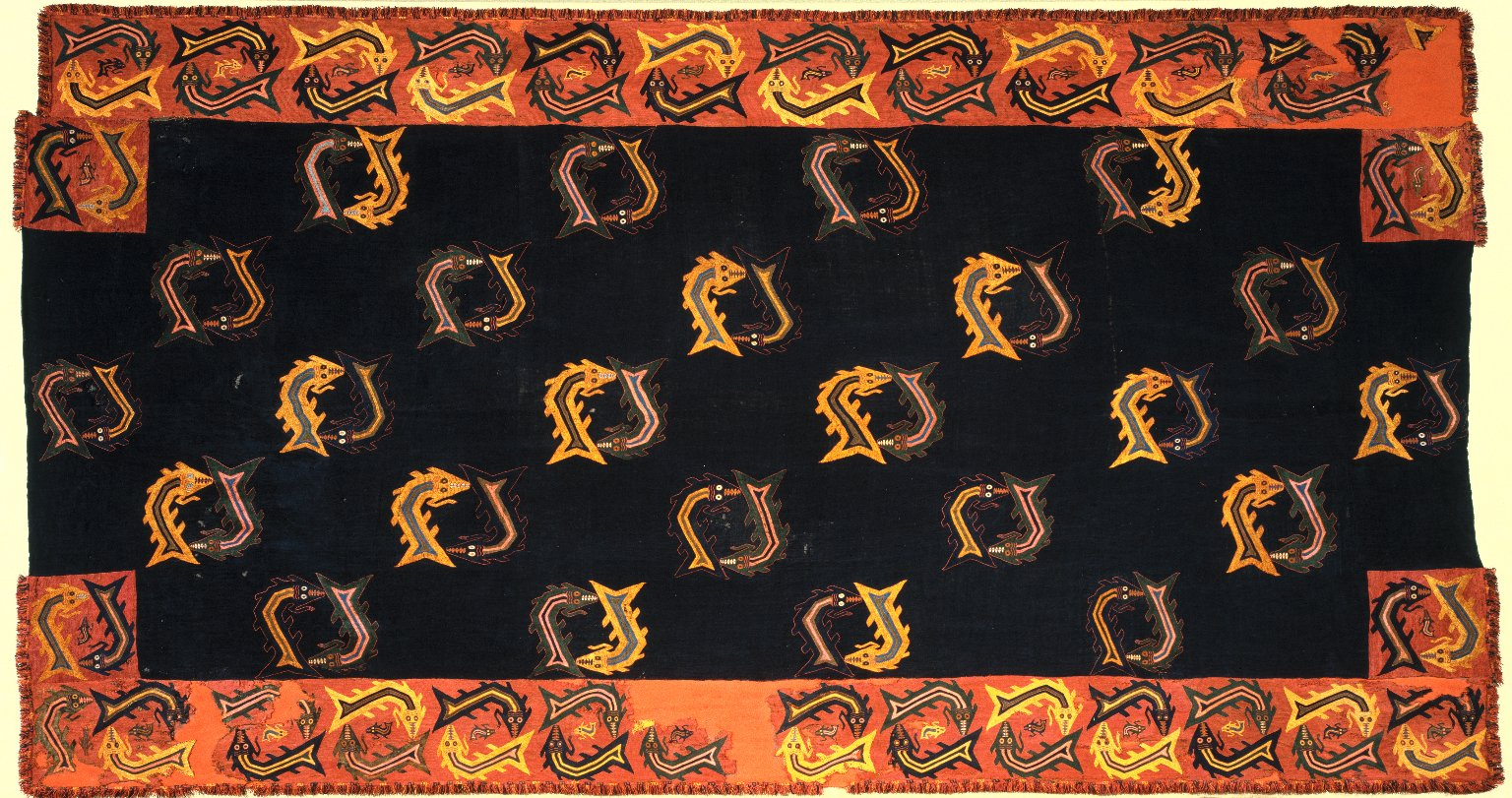
Nazca-Paracas mantle, 1-100 CE, Brooklyn Museum, Brooklyn.

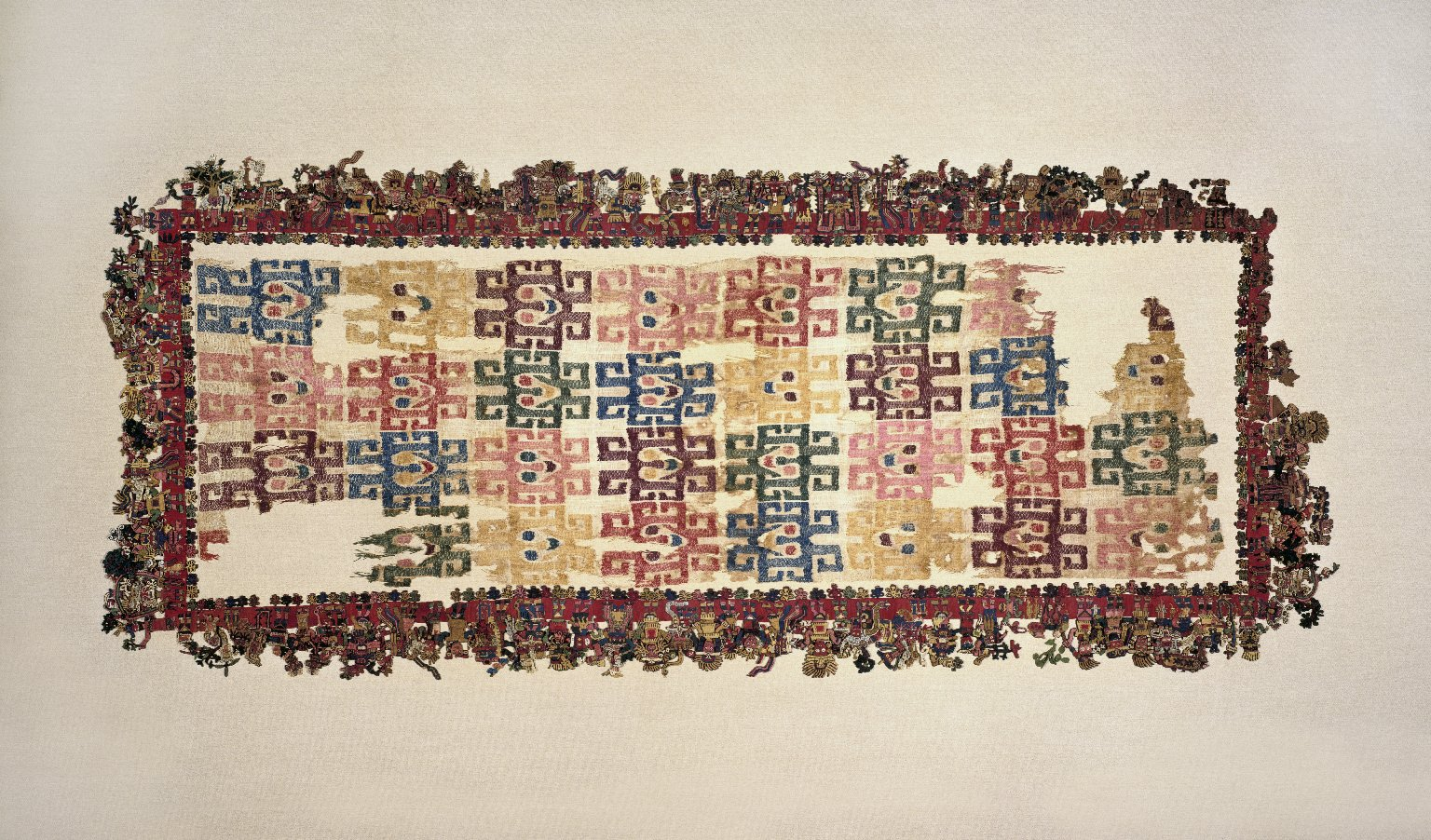
Paracas textile, 100-300 C.E., Brooklyn Museum, Brooklyn.

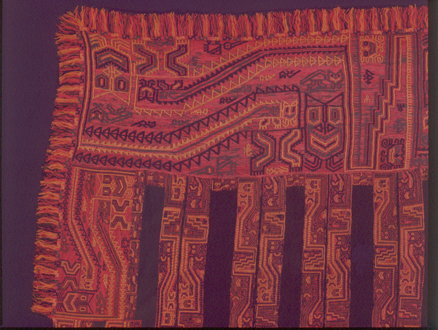
Paracas mantle, c. 200 C.E., Larco Museum, Lima.

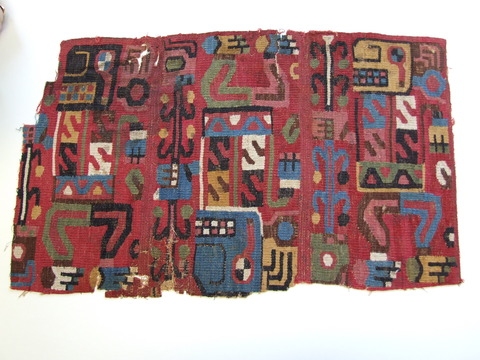
Wari textile fragment, 650-900 C.E., Yale University Art Gallery, New Haven.

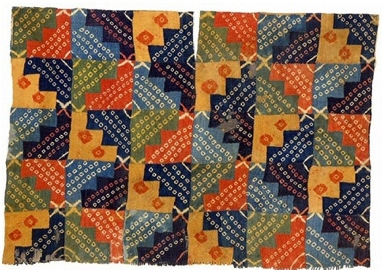
Wari tunic, 750-950 C.E., Textile Museum, Washington, D.C.

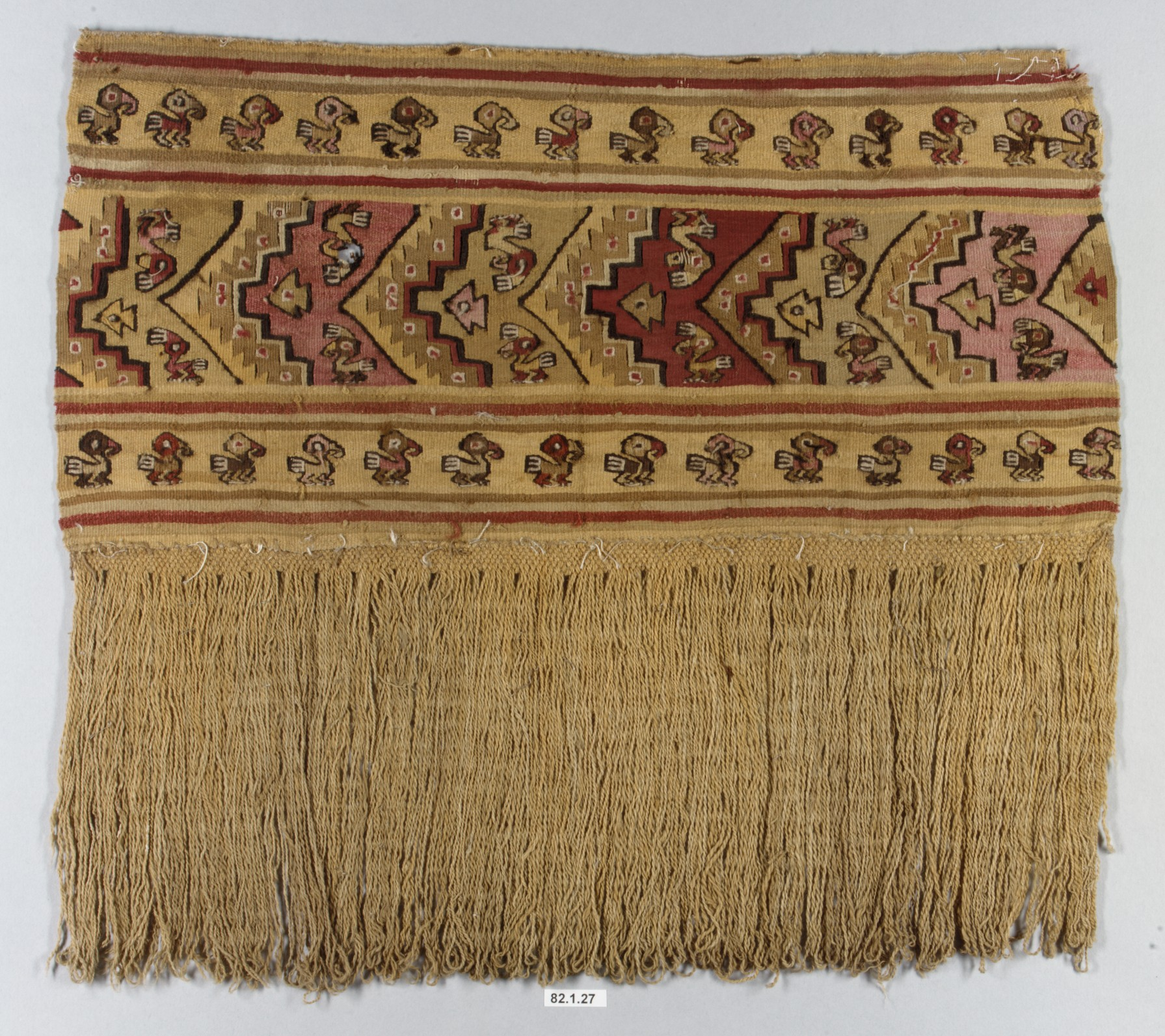
Border fragment, 900-1400 C.E., Metropolitan Museum of Art, New York.

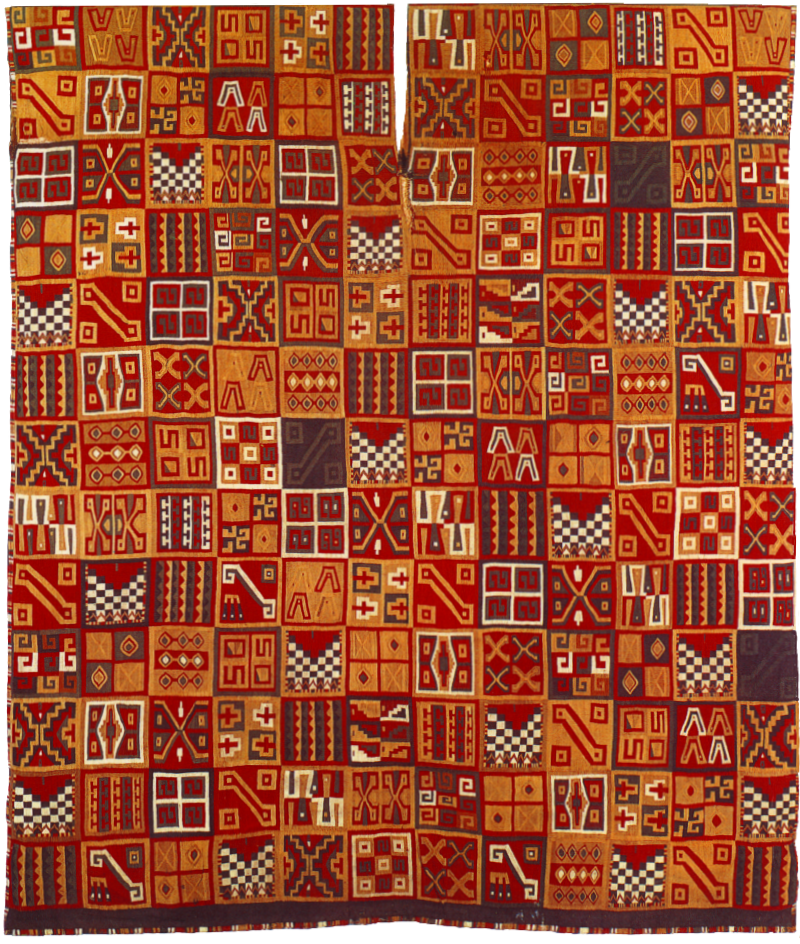
Tupa Inca tunic, c. 1550 C.E., Dumbarton Oaks, Washington, D.C.

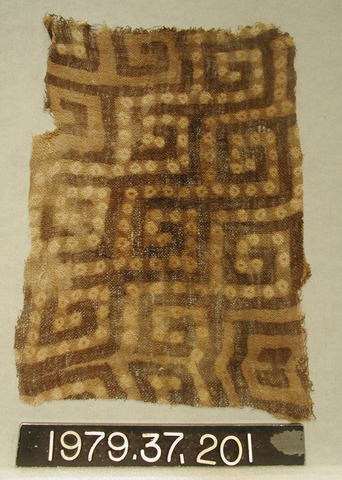
Painted textile fragment, 1000-1476 C.E., Yale University Art Gallery, New Haven.

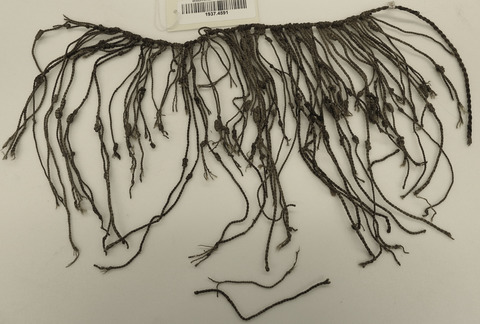
Cotton quipu, 1400-1600 C.E., Yale University Art Gallery, New Haven.

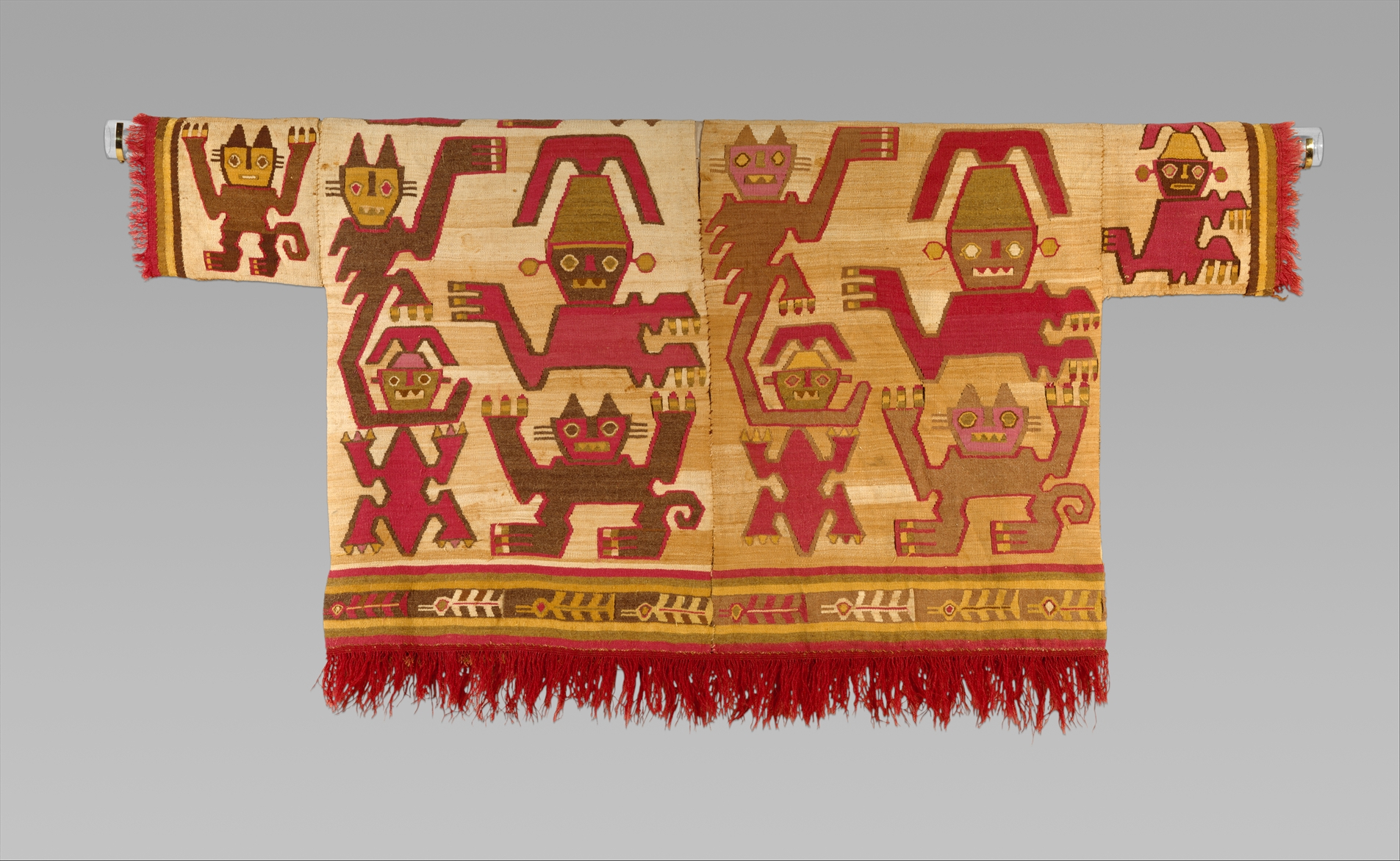
Chimu shirt, 1450-1550 C.E., Metropolitan Museum of Art, New York.

Incan quipu, date unknown, Larco Museum, Lima.

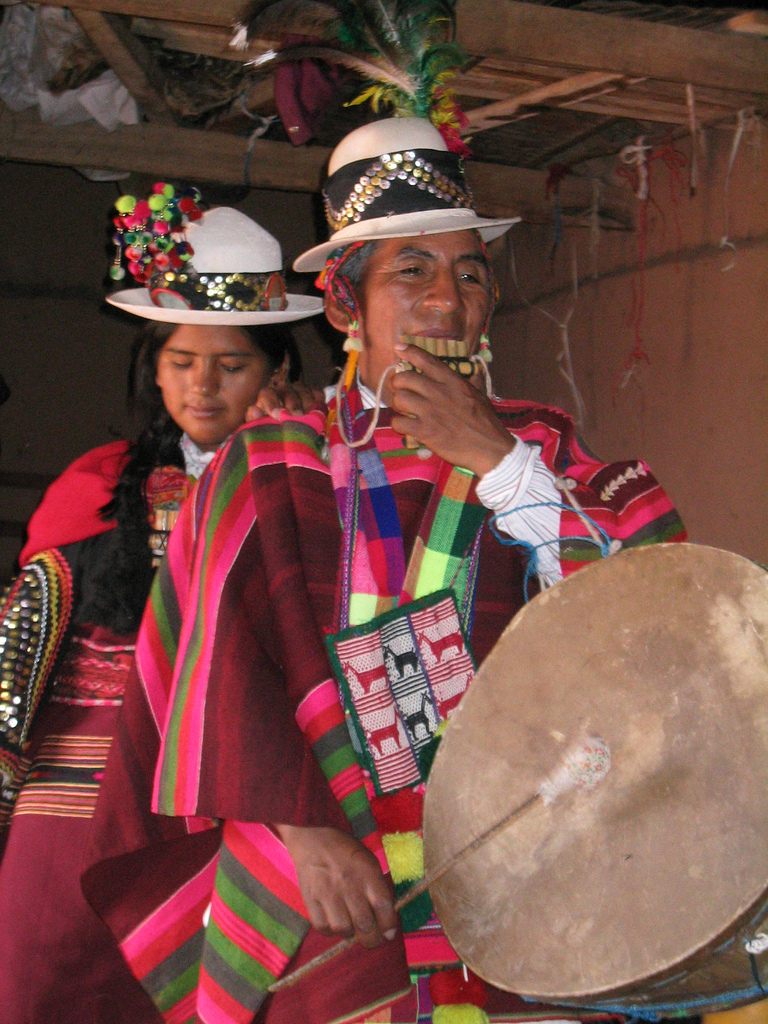
Quechua people wearing contemporary weavings, Sucre, Bolivia

== See also ==
- Mapuche textiles
- Mathematics and art
- Ichcahuipilli
- Textile arts of indigenous peoples of the Americas
- Chuspas
- Chullo
- Lliklla
- Aguayo

== Sources ==
- Paul, Anne (1990). Paracas ritual attire: symbols of authority in ancient Peru. Norman: University of Oklahoma Press. ISBN 978-0806122304.
- Paul, Anne (1985). "The Stitching of Paracas Embroidered Images: Procedural Variations and Differences in Meaning". Res: Anthropology and Aesthetics. 9: 91–100. doi:10.1086/RESv9n1ms20166727. S2CID 193747952.
- Phipps, Elena (2004). The colonial Andes: tapestries and silverwork. New York: The Metropolitan Museum of Art. pp. 1530–1830. ISBN 978-1588391315.
- Phipps, Elena (2014). The Peruvian Four-Selvaged Cloth: Ancient Threads/New Directions. Seattle: University of Washington Press. ISBN 978-0984755059.
- Pillsbury, Joanne (2002). "Inka Unku: Strategy and Design in Colonial Peru". Cleveland Studies in the History of Art. 7: 68–103.
- Stone-Miller, Rebecca (2002). Art of the Andes: from Chavín to Inca. London: Thames and Hudson. ISBN 978-0-500-20363-7.
- Stone-Miller, Rebecca (1994). To Weave for the Sun: Ancient Andean Textiles in the Museum of Fine Arts, Boston. Boston: Thames and Hudson. ISBN 978-0500277935.
