= North Junín Quechua =

Language dialect of Quechua

- Native to: Peru
- Native speakers: (60,000 cited 1998)
- Language family: Quechua: Central (Quechua I); Yaru Quechua; North Junín Quechua

Language codes
- ISO 639-3: Either: qvn – North Junín qvl – Cajatambo North Lima
- Glottolog: nort2980

North Junín Quechua is a language of Quechua spoken throughout the Andean highlands of the Northern Junín and Tarma provinces of Peru. Dialects under North Junín Quechua include Tarma Quechua spoken in Tarma Province and the subdialect San Pedros de Cajas Quechua. North Junín Quechua belongs to the Yaru Quechua dialect cluster under the Quechua I dialects. Initially spoken by Huancas and neighboring native people, the Junín dialect was absorbed by the Inca Empire in 1460 but relatively unaffected by the Southern Cuzco dialect. The Inca Empire had to defeat stiff resistance by the Huanca people.

Currently listed as an endangered language, the San Pedros de Cajas dialect of Quechua has been under study and found in use mainly at home with Spanish being used in schools. A survey conducted in a secondary school resulted in only one out of fifty students answering that they used Quechua at home.

Willem Adelaar has conducted extensive work on Quechua dialects and has published findings on the Tarma dialect. Recent work by linguists have focused on tracing the origin of Quechua by comparing the reconstructed language, Proto- Quechua, with Proto-Aymaran. There exist arguments on both sides as Paul Heggarty argues against a distant relationship. Similarities have been found to span both proto-languages from reconstruction of a variety of Quechua dialects; commonalities include apa- meaning "to carry," picqa meaning "five," urqu meaning "mountain," and qipa meaning "before (space), after (time)," all words in Junín Quechua. Qipa exemplifies relative temporal marking rather than tense marking.

== Phonology ==
For an inventory of phonemes of both Tarma and San Juan de Cajas dialects see and respectively. The de-aspiration of the phoneme tʃ, i.e. tʃ' -> tʃ, has been noted. In addition, stops do not have aspiration or glottalization, but can be voiced; as discussed earlier, vowel length can be phonemic.

The Tarma dialect has 3 vowels: /a, i, u/. All vowels have long equivalents, and North Junin displays contrastive vowel length. The consonant chart is from the Tarma dialect.

Consonants
		Bilabial	Alveolar	Palato-alveolar	Retroflex	Palatal	Velar
Stop	voiceless	p	t				k
Stop	voiced	b					g
Affricate				t͡ʃ	tʂ		
Fricative			s	ʃ			x
Nasal		m	n			ɲ	ŋ
Approximant	plain					j	w
Approximant	lateral					ʎ	
Flap							

The variety of Tarma spoken in San Pedro de Cajas lacks a voiced bilabial stop /b/ and adds a voiceless uvular fricative /χ/.

== Morphology ==
An agglutinating language, Quechua has been analyzed by sub-grouping its copious morphemes together, particularly its suffixes. A feature of Junín Quechua and Quechua I, which includes North Junín dialect, belongs to characterization of non-final suffixes.

The suffixes of verbs in basically every Quechua I dialect subdivides into final and non-final suffixes. North Junín Quechua holds a division of non-final verb suffixes into the left and right block. The right block, usually inflectional, participates in similar fashion to final verb suffixes in allowing long vowels. The left block merges (and co-lexicalizes) with verb roots such that its non-final verb suffixes can be both derivational and inflectional. A prescribed order affects the right-block suffixes such that, for a causative suffix, morphemes occur in a specified order regardless of their relationship to the subject. Vowel length can change meaning in ways including but not limited to marking first person, marking causation, and marking pronouns. These relationships form a structural explanation for Tarma Quechua's agglutinating script.

Tarma Quechua possesses some unique changes to the directional morphemes that denote "Up," "Down," "In," and "Out." The "Down" morpheme "rpu" exists as a left hand block suffix and has productively led to "lpu" meaning overcoming resistance in addition to simplification to "ru."

=== Nominalization ===
Nominalized clauses can be case marked entirely. The Huanca dialect of North Junin Quechua allows case marking of nominal clauses as the genitive case, restricted in most other Quechua dialects. Furthermore, the nominal clauses only mark relative temporal differences, i.e. no tense marking.
