= Proto-Quechuan language =

Proto-language of the Quechuan language family

Proto-Quechuan
- Reconstruction of: Quechuan languages
- Region: Central Peru
- Era: before 500 BCE

Proto-Quechuan is the hypothetical proto-language that would have given rise to the various languages of the Quechuan language family. This proto-language is reconstructed based on evidence from modern Quechuan languages, as well as records of ancient forms.

== Development ==
Proto-Quechuan was likely spoken in the central region of ancient Peru according to Alfredo Torero. It then expanded southwards to replace Aymara. At the beginning of the fifth century, the proto-Quechua would have crossed the mountain range to settle in the central highlands (Mantaro Valley), then proto-Aymara-speaking, producing the division between Quechua I (to the east) and Quechua II.

== Phonology ==
The syllables of the Quechua languages are composed of at least one vowel as nucleus. As a general rule, the syllables allow a consonant in position of onset and coda (beginning and end of syllable, respectively).

Three vowel phonemes are distinguished: an open vowel /a/, a closed rounded vowel /u/, and unrounded /i/. The precise pronunciation of these vowel phonemes varies with their phonetic environment. The vicinity of a uvular consonant produces more centralized allophones such as [ɑ], [e], [ɛ], [o], [ɔ] and that of the semiconsonant palatal approximant /j/ also causes an overtaking of /a/ to [æ]. As for the consonants, Proto-Quechua would have had three nasal consonants /m, n, ɲ/, four occlusives /p, t, k, q/, two affricates /t͡ʃ, ʈ͡ʂ/, three fricatives /s, ʂ, h/, two approximants /j, w/ and two or three liquids /ʎ, ɾ, (l)/.

Consonant phonemes of Proto-Quechuan
		Bilabial	Alveolar	Post-alveolar	Retroflex	Palatal	Velar	Uvular	Glottal
Nasal		*m	*n			*ɲ			
Plosive		*p	*t				*k	*q	
Affricate				*tʃ	*ʈʂ				
Fricative			*s		*ʂ				*h
Approximant	median					*j	*w		
Approximant	lateral		(*l)			*ʎ			
Tap			*ɾ						

== Phonetic correspondences ==
The following table shows the numerals in Proto-Quechuan and its evolution in different modern Quechua languages:

GLOSS	PROTO- QUECHUAN	Quechua I				Quechua II							
GLOSS	PROTO- QUECHUAN	Huaylas	Huánuco	Huanca	Pacaraos	Cajamarca	Imbabura	Salasaca	Tena	Ayacucho	Cuzco	Bolivian	Santiagueño
'1'	*suk	huk	huk	huk, suk	huk	suχ	ʃux	ʃuh	ʃuk	huk	hux	ux	suk
'2'	*iʂkaj	iʃkaj	iʃkaj	iʃkaj	iʃkaj	iʃkaj	iʃgaj	iʃki	iʃki	iskaj	iskaj	iskaj	iʃkaj
'3'	*kimsa	kima, kimsa	kimsa	kimsa	kima	kimsa	kinsa	kinsa	kinsa	kimsa	kinsa	kinsa	kimsa
'4'	*ʈʂusku	ʧusku	ʧusku	ʈʂusku	ʈʂusku	ʈʂusku	ʧusku	ʧusku	ʧusku	tawa	tawa	tawa	taa
'5'	*piʧqa	piʦqa	piʧɢa	piʧʔa	pisχa	piʧqa	piʧa	piʧka	piʧka	piʧχa	pʰisqa	pʰiʃqa	piʃqa
'6'	*suqta	huqta	suχta	suʔta	huχta	suχta	sukta	sukta	sukta	suχta	suqta	suhta	suqta
'7'	*qanʈʂis	qanʧis	ɢanʧis	ʔanʈʂis	ʁanʈʂis	qanʈʂis	kanʧis	kanʧis	kanʤis	χanʧis	qanʧis	qanʧis	qanʧis
'8'	*pusaq	puwaq	pusaχ	pusaː	puwaχ	pusaχ	pusax	pusah	pusak	pusaχ	pusaq	pusah	pusaq
'9'	*isqun	isqun	isɢun	isʕun	isʁun	isqun	iskun	iskun	iskun	isχun	isqun	hisqʼun	isqun
'10'	*ʈʂunka	ʧuŋka	ʧuŋka	ʈʂunka	ʈʂuŋka	ʈʂuŋga	ʧuŋga	ʧuŋga	ʧuŋga	ʧuŋka	ʧunka	ʧuŋka	ʧuŋka
