= Anaku (disambiguation) =

- Anaku, an exercise in karate
- Anaku Town, place in Anambra State, Nigeria
- Anaku (dress), a skirt-type draped garment of indigenous women in the Inca Empire
