= Ancash Quechua =

Quechua variety of Peru

- qichwa, nuna shimi
- Native to: Peru
- Native speakers: (est. 700,000 cited 1994–2017)
- Language family: Quechua: Quechua I; Central; Ancash Quechua

Language codes
- ISO 639-3: Variously: qwa – Corongo qwh – Huaylas qxn – Norte de Conchucos qws – Sihuas qxo – Sur de Conchucos qvh – Huamalíes y Norte de Dos de Mayo
- Glottolog: huay1239
- ELP: Conchucos Quechua
- Linguasphere: 84-FAA-e
- 84-FAA-fa

Ancash Quechua (Huaylas Ancash Quechua: qichwa [ˈqɛtʃ.wa], or less often nuna shimi), also Huaylay or Waylay in linguistic terminology, is a Quechua variety spoken in the Peruvian department of Ancash by approximately 1,000,000 people. Like Wanka Quechua, it belongs to Quechua I (according to Alfredo Torero).

== Classification ==
The Ancash Quechua varieties belong to the Quechua I branch of the homonymous language family, belonging to a dialectal continuum extended in the central Peruvian Sierra from Ancash in the north to the provinces of Castrovirreyna and Yauyos in the south.

Some varieties bordering this continuum partially share morphological characteristics that distinguish the Ancash group from the other central Quechua, so it is difficult to establish a discrete limit. Among these nearby varieties are the Quechua of Bolognesi, Ocros and Cajatambo and that of the Alto Marañón region in the department of Huánuco.

== See also ==
- Quechuan and Aymaran spelling shift
