= Quecha =

Quecha may refer to two different groups of Native American peoples and languages:

- Quechan, people who live on the Fort Yuma Indian Reservation in Arizona and California
  - Quechan language, language of the Quechan people
- Quechua people of South America, including Peru, Ecuador, Bolivia, Chile, Colombia and Argentina
  - Quechuan languages, family of languages spoken by the Quechua peoples

== See also ==
- Quechua (disambiguation)
