= Funeral bundle =

A funeral bundle is a method of enclosing a corpse before burial, practiced by the Paracas culture of the Peruvian Andes. The well-preserved funeral bundles of the Paracas have allowed archaeologists to study their funeral rituals in detail. Over 429 funeral bundles containing gift textiles, reams of plain cloth, and various ritual paraphernalia have been excavated from a necropolis at Cerro Colorado. These artifacts offer the largest source of pre-Columbian Andean textile arts known to date.

The naked body of the deceased is bundled in the fetal position before rigor mortis sets in. A long strip of coarse cotton cloth was then wrapped around the body. Along with the bodies, different kinds of memorabilia have been found, including clothing, food, scraps of cloth or clothed dolls with religious embroidered motifs, and small badges of gold, and these "gifts" form the nucleus of the bundle. Many fabrics interred with the dead were created for expressly for the funerary ritual, and were not worn during life. Also found in numerous burial sites were bodiless heads, wrapped in fine cloth, similar to those depicted in the borders of the textiles wrapping the body of the deceased.

In adult burials, one usually finds on this nucleus an additional layer, formed of pieces of ceremonial garments, decorated with embroideries and protected by several sheets of cotton fabric. These were cooked and tied with cord to facilitate the transportation of the bundle to the burial site. Facing the bundle, mourners would place between one and seven ceramic pieces. A pole or a cane indicated the precise place of the burial. Individuals of major status received more textile gifts and, in this case, the number of layers increased substantially: up to three successive layers could be added onto the nucleus. These layers, and in particular the last one, usually contained decorative embroidered cloaks.

The burials have a collective character, as it is thought that related individuals were generally buried together in the caverns dug in the rock or in the sand. In several cases, it has been determined that remains were transported and re-interred some years after death. Burial areas are located next to established living places. Often, an area that was inhabited earlier by the living, such as the ruins of houses and public buildings, were used for a necropolis.
