= Uncu =

Men's garment of the Inca Empire

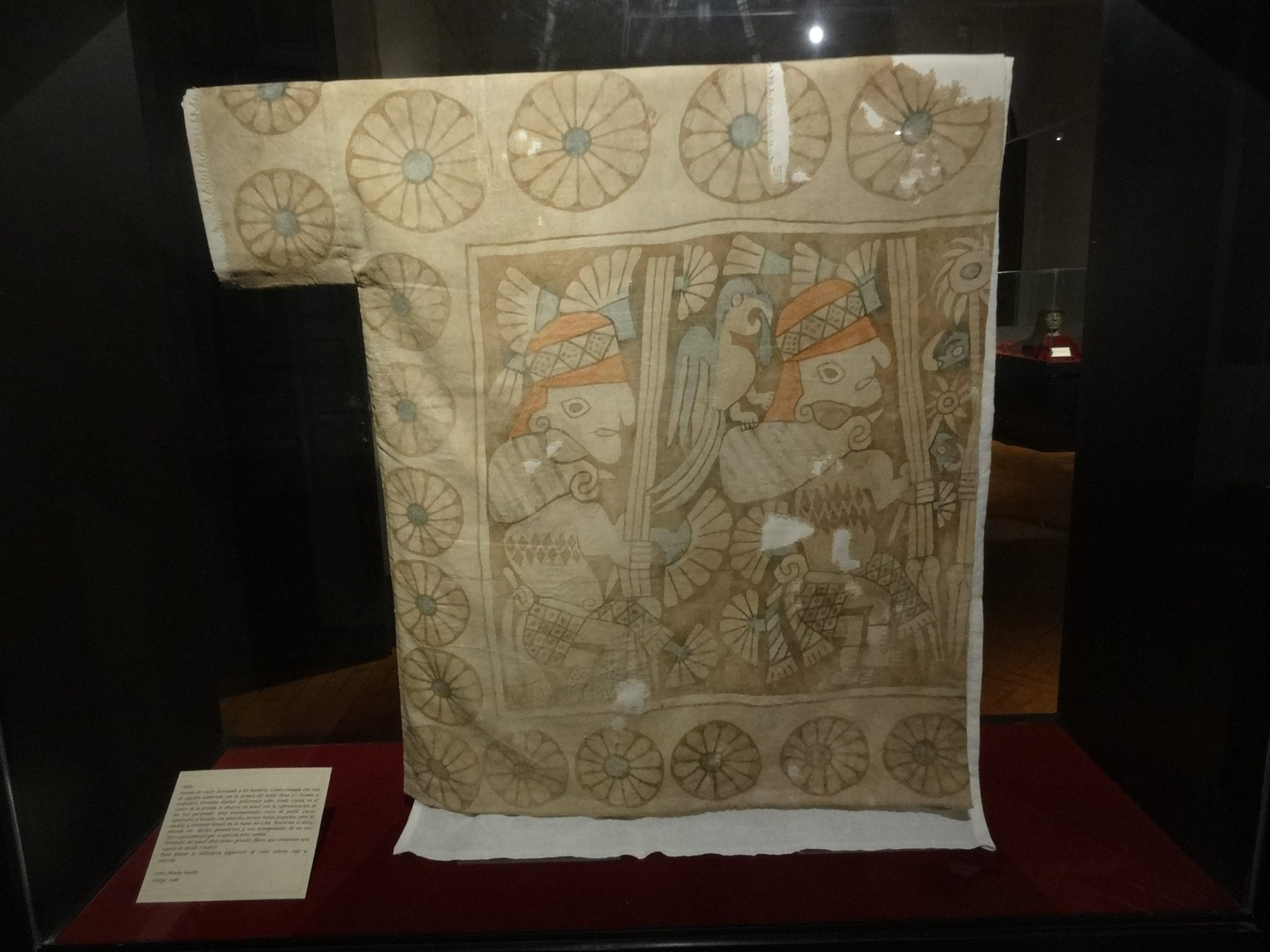
Uncu

Uncu (Unku) was a men's garment of the Inca Empire. It was an upper-body garment of knee-length; Royals wore it with a mantle cloth called ''yacolla.'' Women wore a long dress known as an anaku.

== Structure ==
Uncu was similar to a long tunic, ranging between 84 and 100 cms, with a 72-79 cms width range. However, the length of the highland and coastal garments was different; Uncu in the highland were sleeveless and longer than the coastal tunic. Kings, nobles, and ordinary people all wore Uncu. The design and motifs for these dresses were rank-, cultural-, and event-specific. For example, capac uncu was a rich, powerful shirt worn by Inca Roca (the king). Inca royals clothing consisted of ''tocapu'' an art of geometric figures enclosed by rectangles or squares.

Each garment was woven individually.

== Material ==
Ordinary Uncu was made from cotton blending with various camelidae fibres such as llama, alpaca, guanaco, and vicuña, but for royal use, a whole finest cloth (cumbi) was used.

== Gallery ==
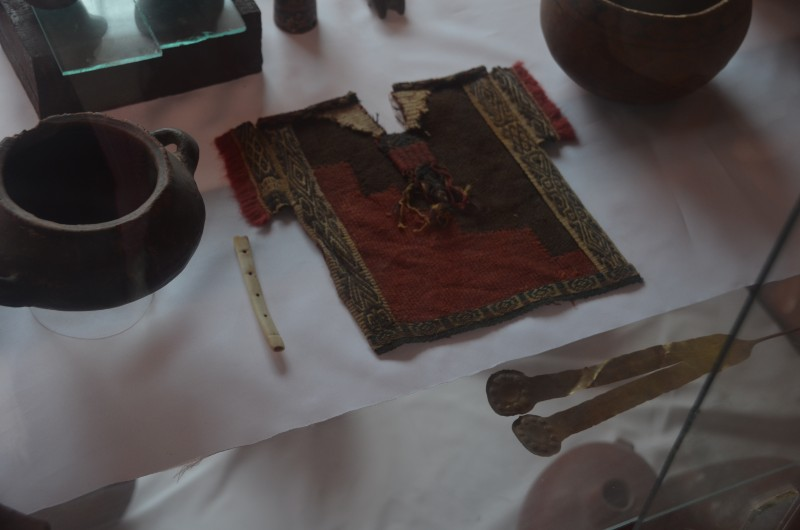
Uncu

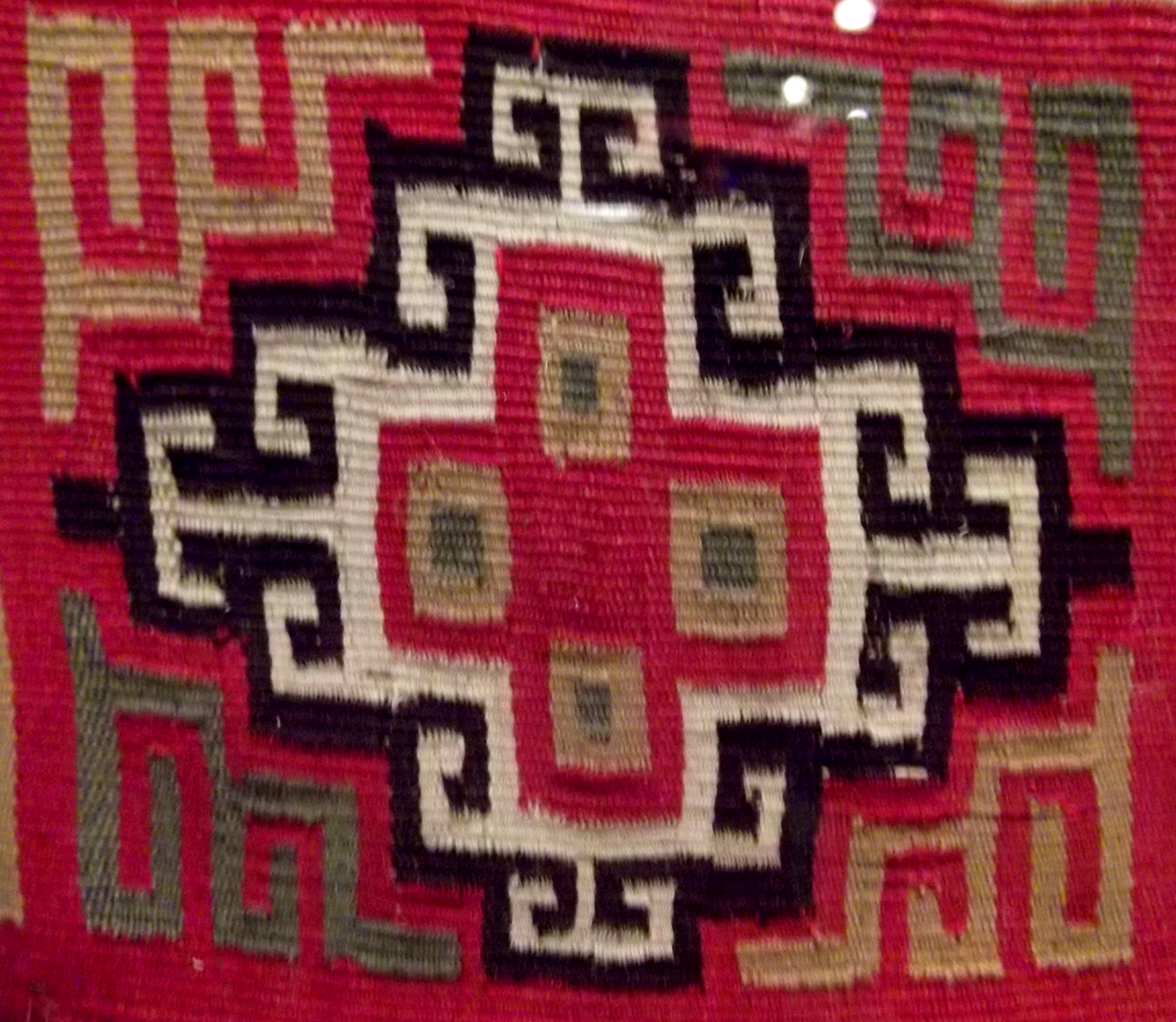
Uncu

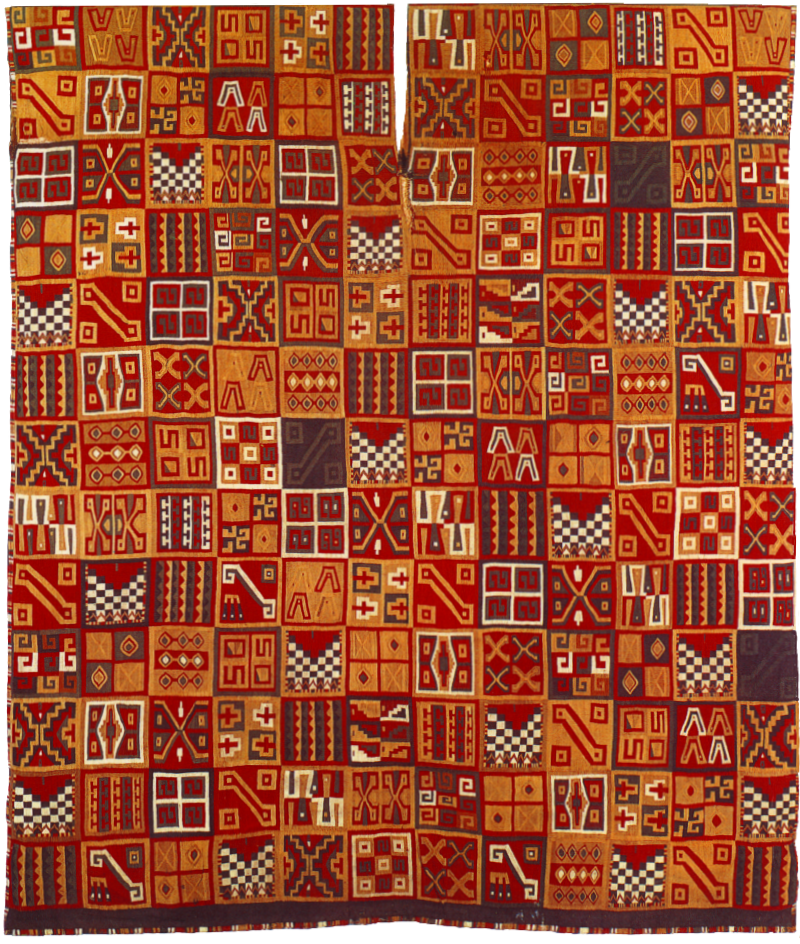
Inca tunic

Inca Tunic, 15th-16th Century
