= Cumbi =

Fine luxurious fabric of the Inca Empire

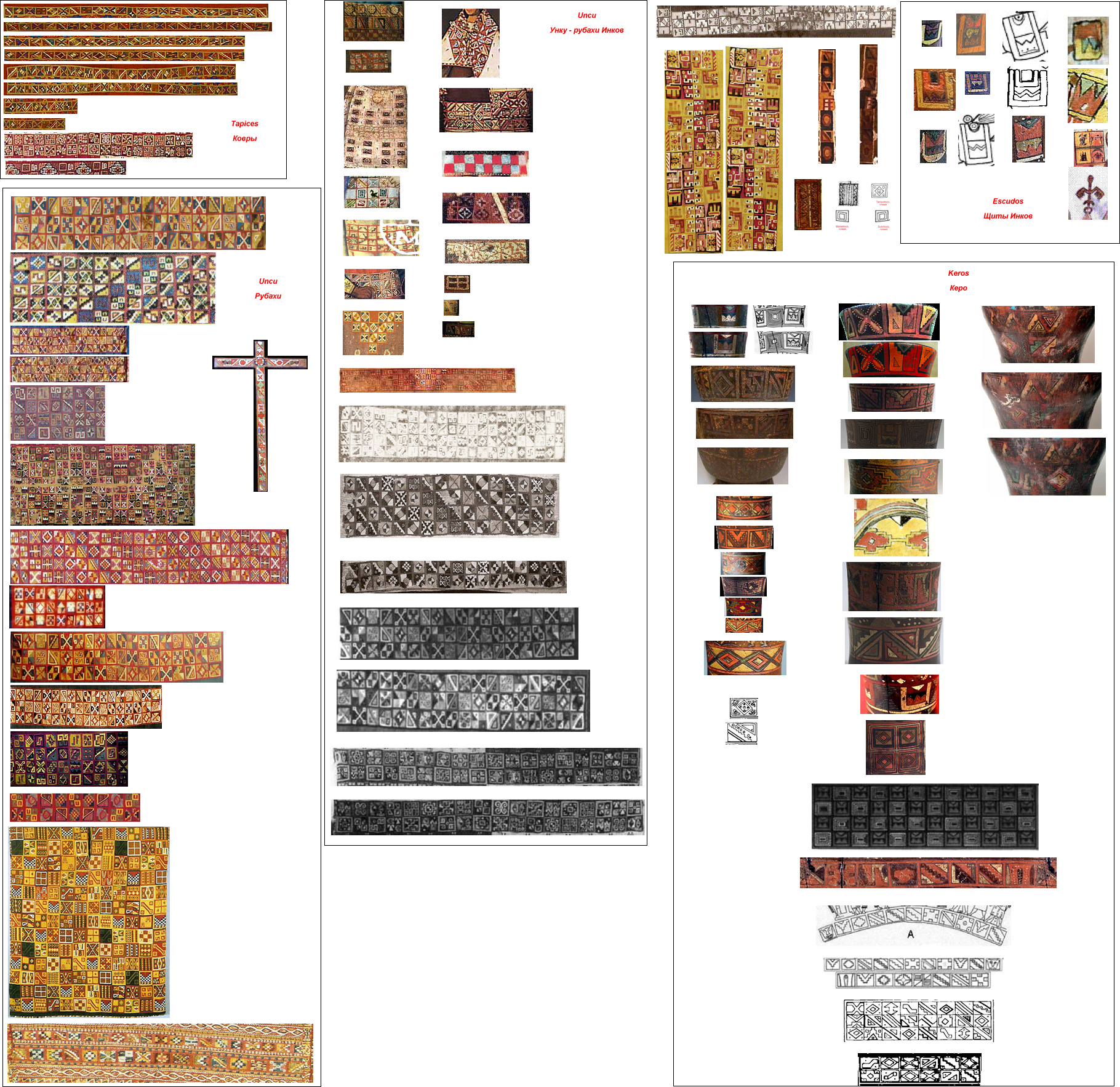
Tocapu. Textiles worn by the Inca elite consisting of geometric figures enclosed by rectangles or squares.

Cumbi (Qunpi, Qompi, Kumpi) was a fine luxurious fabric of the Inca Empire. Elites used to offer cumbi to the rulers, and it was a reserved cloth for Royalty. Common people were not allowed to use Cumbi. Cumbi was a phenomenal textile art of Andean textiles.

== Structure ==
The fabric was a fine tapestry structure woven with superfine local cotton and vicuña wool. The male weavers used upright looms.

== Inca textiles ==
Textile production was the second most important after agriculture in the Inca period. The strength was the raw material like alpaca and llama wool as well as indigenous cotton. Textile materials were classified into many categories, Chusi was the coarsest cloth used for blankets and rugs. The closest to Cumbi are the following:

=== Awsaka ===
Awaska, a warp faced plain weave cloth with a 120 thread count for regular use, like daily household goods. Awaska was used for blankets and rugs. It was a coarse wool material from sheep or llama.

=== Qunpi ===
Qunpi was a finer and more delicate type than Awaska, divided further into two varieties:

- Male weavers wove this type. Highly skilled weavers were engaged in weaving Cumbi. They were called ''Cumbi camayos'' (cumbi cloth makers). Cumbi weaving was their only job. It was allowed for specific usages like the clothing of the rulers, gifts for the nobles, and trading purposes.
- The finest cloth type of Qunpi had a thread count of 600, was woven by ''acllas'' exclusive female weavers in Cuzco. The fabric was used for defined practices like religious rituals and royal use only. This particular type of cloth was unmatchable throughout the world till machines overtook in the 19th century.

Cumbi was a valuable textile material; hence the material used was the finest wool from lamb. However, the richest version of the cloth was woven with Vicuña.

== Use ==
Cumbi and Tokapu, a traditional decorative work, was exclusive to the Inca monarchy. After the destruction of the Inca state, the rules relaxed, and nobles were allowed to use the fabric. Cumbi was used for Royal usages, e.g., various clothing items such as Uncu and attire for religious rituals.
