= Yaru Quechua =

Quechuan dialect cluster of west-central Peru

- Kichwa
- Native to: Peru
- Native speakers: (90,000 cited 1993–2017) plus 20,000 Chaupihuaranga (1972 census, decreasing)
- Language family: Quechua: Central (Quechua I); Yaru Quechua

Language codes
- ISO 639-3: Variously: qva – Ambo-Pasco qur – Chaupihuaranga / Yanahuanca qxt – Santa Ana de Tusi Pasco qvn – North Junín
- Glottolog: yaru1256 paca1245 Pacaraos
- ELP: Yaru Quechua

Yaru Quechua is a dialect cluster of Quechua, spoken in the Peruvian provinces of Pasco and Daniel Alcides Carrión and neighboring areas in northern Junín and Lima department.

The branch of Yaru which has been best described is Tarma Quechua, by Willem F. H. Adelaar in his 1977 Tarma Quechua: Grammar, texts, dictionary. Tarma Quechua is spoken in the districts of Tarma, Huaricolca, Acobamba, La Unión Leticia, Palca, Palcamayo, Tapo, Huasahuasi and San Pedro de Cajas in Junín region, Peru. (See North Junín Quechua.)

== Bibliography ==
- Adelaar, Willem (2004). The Languages of the Andes. Cambridge Language Surveys. With the collaboration of Pieter C. Muysken. Cambridge University Press. doi:10.1017/CBO9780511486852. ISBN 978-0-521-36831-5.
