= Huanca =

Huanca Quechua
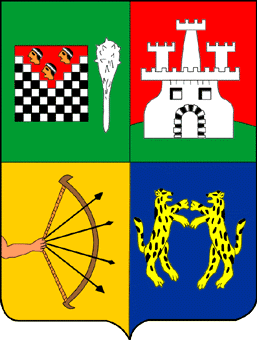
- Coat of Arms given by Philip II, representing the union between the Huancas and the Spaniards

Total population
- 90,727 (2000–2002)

Regions with significant populations
- Peru

Languages
- Jauja Wanca Quechua, Huaylla Wanca Quechua, Spanish

Religion
- Roman Catholicism, traditional religion

Related ethnic groups
- other Quechua peoples

The Huancas, Wancas, or Wankas are a Quechua people living in the Junín Region of central Peru, in and around the Mantaro Valley.

== Names ==
The southern branch of Huanca people are called the Wanka Waylla Quechua and Southern Huancayo Quechua. The Jauja Wanka are also called Wanka Jauja Quechua and Shawsha Wanka Quechua people. They gave their name to the Peruvian football team Deportivo Wanka.

== History ==
Prior to being incorporated into the Inca Empire, the Huanca had a polity that has by some been described as a state and by others as a chiefdom. The Huanca cultivated various root crops and maize, as well as herded llama.

After fierce fighting, the Huanca people were conquered by Pachacuti in the 15th century and incorporated into Tawantinsuyu, the Inca Empire. After being conquered, the Huanca provided soldiers for Inca campaigns in Quito. However, upon the arrival of Spaniards, the Huanca allied with the Spaniards against the Inca during the conquest of Peru. They provided supplies and men to the Spanish army.

== Language ==
The Huanca people speak Jauja Wanka Quechua and Waylla Wanka Quechua, both Quechua I languages. These languages differ significantly from the Incas' Quechua of Cusco. (see Mantaro Valley)
