= Anaku (dress) =

Skirt-type draped garment of women in the Inca Empire

Anaku (Quechua pronunciation: [aˈnaku]) or aksu (Quechua pronunciation: [ˈak.su] or [ˈax.su]) was a skirt-type garment of indigenous women in the Inca Empire. It was a long draped dress straight in shape, falling to ankle length.

== Style ==
Anaku was a typical dress of Andean women. It was a long rectangular piece of woven cloth wool fibers, a simple draping garment. The traditional wearing style of Otavalo women was different, as they were wearing it with a blouse. An ankle-length anaku (as an underskirt) was wrapped over with another anku.

=== Evolution ===
The full-body Anaku evolved to half-body Anaku in certain areas. Initially, the anaku was larger, that changed with generations; the length of the garment became shorter and changed to half of the ancestral version. It is still a costume that Otavalo people wore. Anku was tied around the waist with a sash called ''chumbi'' or ''chumpi'' or ''Chumpia''. There was a similar type but ankle-length garment ''aksu'' that was worn in Southern parts. Anaku as a wrap skirt still worn around Northern Ecuador.

== See also ==
- Uncu, a men's garment of the Inca Empire
- Tocapu, geometrical motifs used by Incas
- Cumbi, a fine luxurious fabric of the Inca Empire
