= Huaylas Quechua =

Quechuan language of west-central Peru

- Nunashimi, Qichwa
- Native to: Peru
- Native speakers: 170,000 (2017)
- Language family: Quechua: Central (Quechua I); Ancash Quechua languages; Huaylas Quechua

Language codes
- ISO 639-3: qwh
- Glottolog: huay1240
- ELP: Huaylas Quechua
- Linguasphere: 84-FAA-ebc
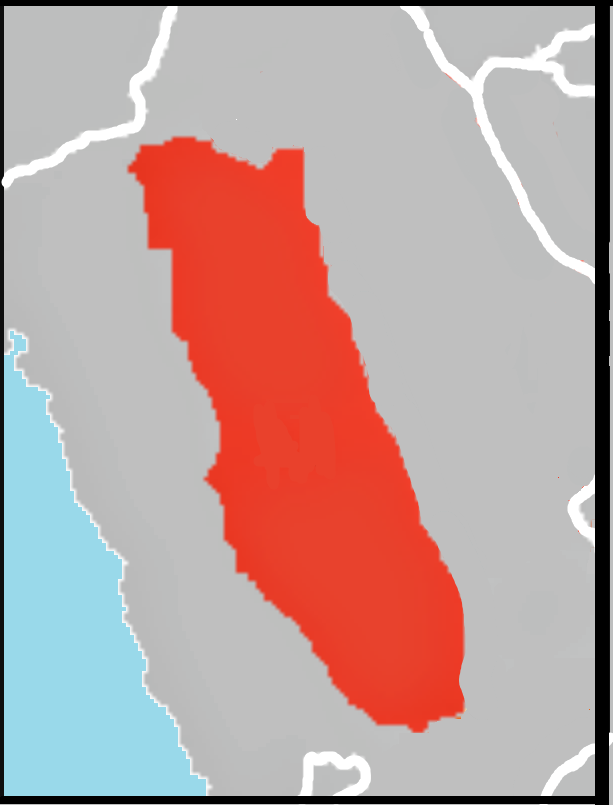
- Huaylas Quechua in Ancash

Huaylas Quechua is an Ancash Quechua dialect spoken in the Callejón de Huaylas and in the western slope of the Cordillera Negra.

The main peculiarities of this variety are phonetic. In Quechua Ancash-Huailas a phenomenon of monophthongation of syllables with semiconsonants in coda is present: "aw" is often pronounced as [oː] elongated, likewise "ay" as [eː]. For example, awmi is pronounced [oːmi], chawpi (center) [t͡ʃoːpi] and aywan (walks) as [eːwan]. In grammatical terms, Huaylas lacks the suffix -ski.

== Phonology ==
=== Consonants ===
		Labial	Alveolar		Retroflex	Palatal	Velar	Uvular
		Labial	plain	sibilant	Retroflex	Palatal	Velar	Uvular
Nasal		m	n			ɲ	(ŋ)	
Plosive/ Affricate	voiceless	p	t	t͡s	t͡ʂ	t͡ʃ	k	q
Plosive/ Affricate	voiced	(b)	(d)				(ɡ)	
Fricative		(f)		s		ʃ	x	
Approximant	central	w				j		
Approximant	lateral		l			ʎ		
Tap/Trill			r		(ɽ)			

- Sounds /b, d, ɡ, f/ are heard from Spanish loanwords.
- /r/ may be heard as either a tap [ɾ] or a trill [r]. It is also heard as a retroflex tap [ɽ] when in final positions.
- /n/ is heard as velar [ŋ] when preceding other consonants, or in word-final position.
- /q/ may be heard as fricatives [χ] when in final-syllable position, and as voiced [ʁ] when in intervocalic or initial-syllable positions.
- /x/ may also be heard as glottal [h] in free variation.

=== Vowels ===
	Front	Central	Back
High	i iː		u uː
Mid	(e eː)		(o) oː
Low		a aː	

- Diphthong sounds include /aj, uj, aw/.
- Sounds /i, u/ are heard as mid [e, o] when within the positions of a uvular /q/.
- A long mid [eː] is heard as a realization of a diphthong /aj/. [oː] is commonly heard as a realization of the diphthong /aw/.

== Bibliography ==
- Menacho López, Leonel Alexander (2005). Yachakuqkunapa Shimi Qullqa: Anqash Qichwa Shimichaw. Lima: Ministerio de Educación de Perú. ISBN 9972-881-30-X.
- Parker, Gary (1976). Gramática quechua: Ancash-Huailas. Lima: Ministerio de Educación e Instituto de Estudios Peruanos.
