= Wanka Quechua =

Quechua variety of Peru

- Wanka Nunashimi, Wanka Limay
- Native to: Peru
- Native speakers: (Shawsha Wanka: 25,000 cited 1962 census); Waylla Wanka: 250,000 (2002)
- Language family: Quechua: Central (Quechua I); Wanka Quechua

Language codes
- ISO 639-3: Either: qvw – Waylla Wanka qxw – Shawsha (Jauja) Wanka
- Glottolog: jauj1237

Wanka Quechua (Wanka Limay, Wanka Nunashimi) is a Quechuan language (part of the Quechua languages), spoken in the southern part of Peruvian region of Junín by the Wanka people.

Wanka Quechua belongs to Quechua I, similar to Ancash Quechua. It has about 300,000 speakers and three main dialects: Waylla Wanka in Huancayo and Chupaca provinces, Waycha Wanka in Concepción and Shawsha Wanka in Jauja. Rodolfo Cerrón Palomino, a native Wanka speaker, published the first Wanka grammar and dictionary in 1977.

== Phonology ==
=== Consonants ===
		Labial	Alveolar	Retroflex	Palatal	Velar	Glottal
Nasal		m	n		ɲ	(ŋ)	
Plosive/Affricate		p	t	t͡ʂ	t͡ʃ	k (ɡ)	
Fricative			s	(ʂ)	ʃ	(x)	h
Approximant	central	w			j		
Approximant	lateral		l		ʎ		
Trill			r				

- Other sounds /b, d, f/ are heard from Spanish loanwords.
- /n/ may be heard as velar [ŋ] when in other environments.
- /ʃ/ can be heard as retroflex [ʂ] in free variation.
- /k/ can be heard as [ɡ] when in intervocalic positions.
- /h/ may also be heard as velar [x] in free variation.

=== Vowels ===
	Front	Central	Back
High	i		u
Mid	(e)		(o)
Low		a	

- Vowel length is also distinctive
- Sounds [e, o] are from Spanish loanwords.
