= Alto Marañón =

Region in Peru

Alto Marañón is a region in Peru with an area of more than 30,000 square kilometres. It is located within the northeastern region of the Marañón. The region has five significant rivers and a population in excess of 40,000 people. The population is distributed across 240 communities of mainly indigenous people. The settlers of the zone characterize themselves by a strong indigenous feeling, pride and participation at level of organization and political activity.
