= Tocapu =

Geometrical motifs used by Incas

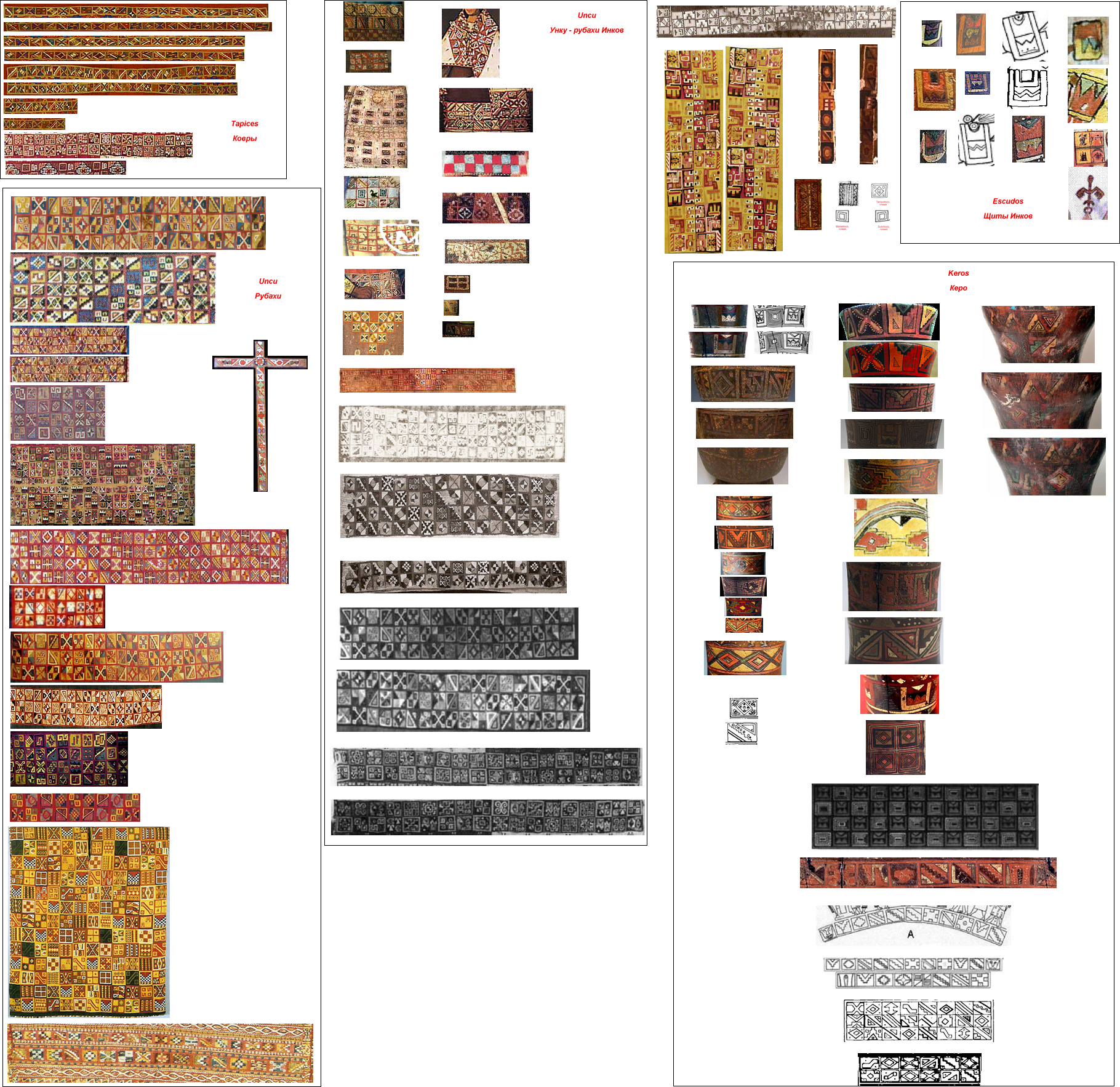
Tocapu. Textiles worn by the Inca elite consisting of geometric figures enclosed by rectangles or squares.

Tocapu (Tocapo or Tokapu) was a decorative artwork with discrete geometrical motifs. It was associated with Andean textiles, especially for the use of the Royals' clothing. Tocapu was also painted on wooden boards.

== Motifs ==
Tocapu was an integral part of the various textiles used in the Inca Empire. The designs were woven into the fabrics. In Tocapu, a nearly square frame inside a field is divided and subdivided into various geometric shapes.

=== Repeat Setting ===
A repeat of the designs was combined following the suitability, for example, of repeating the single design unit or forming a group of units, such as a band (for example, a band on the bottom of uncu) or sometimes Tocapu motifs were given in a scattered way also (without any arrangement).

== Study ==
Tocapu used by Incas always remained a subject of research for assuming the existence of pictographic or ideographic writing.

=== About symbols and signs ===
The Tocapu is evaluated more than decorative values.

Santacruz Pachacuti Yamqui explained:

Each town was referred to by a sign system well recognized in the Andes, the pacarina. Manco Capac is credited with originating this custom whereby each province and each town chose an object to symbolize its origin.

— Signs, songs, and memory in the Andes: translating Quechua language and culture

== Gallery ==
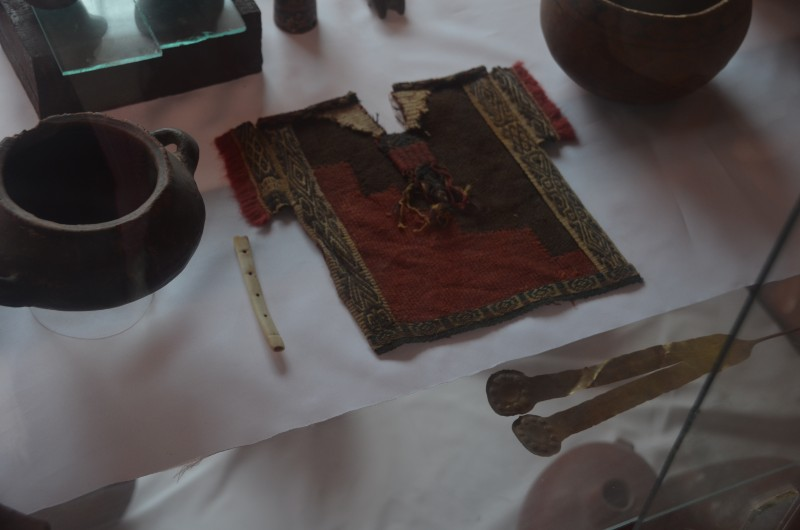
Uncu with Tocapu

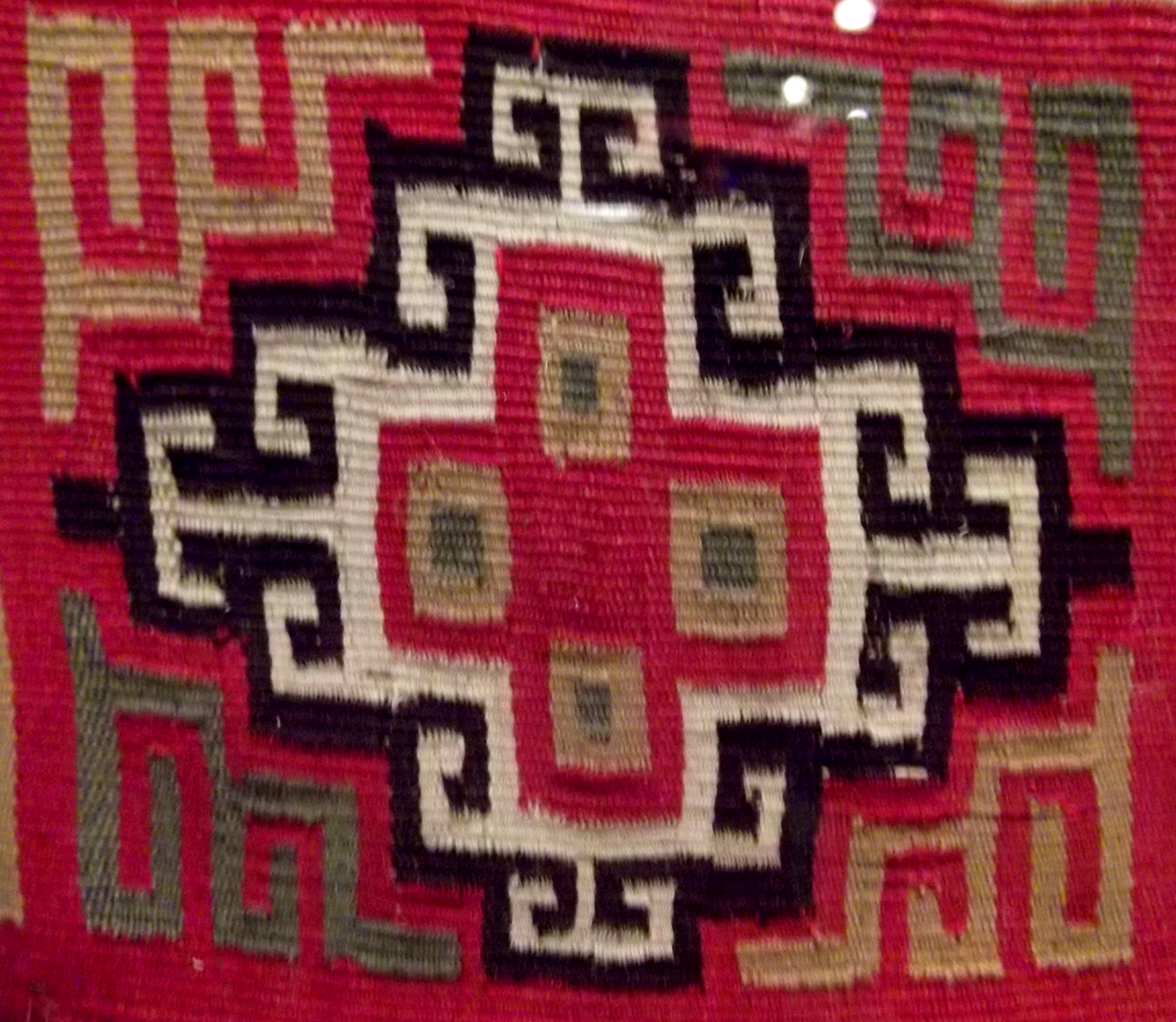
Uncu with Tocapu

Inca Tunic, 15th-16th Century

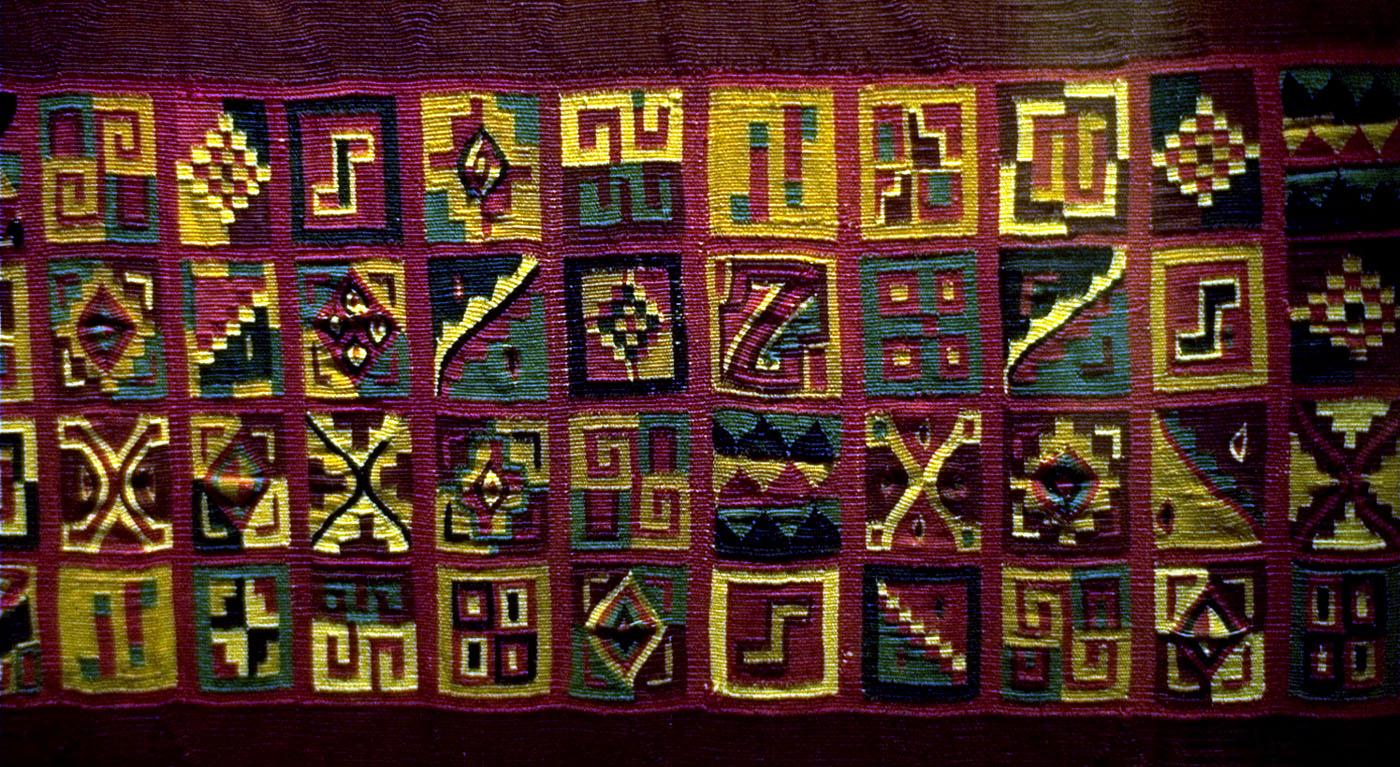

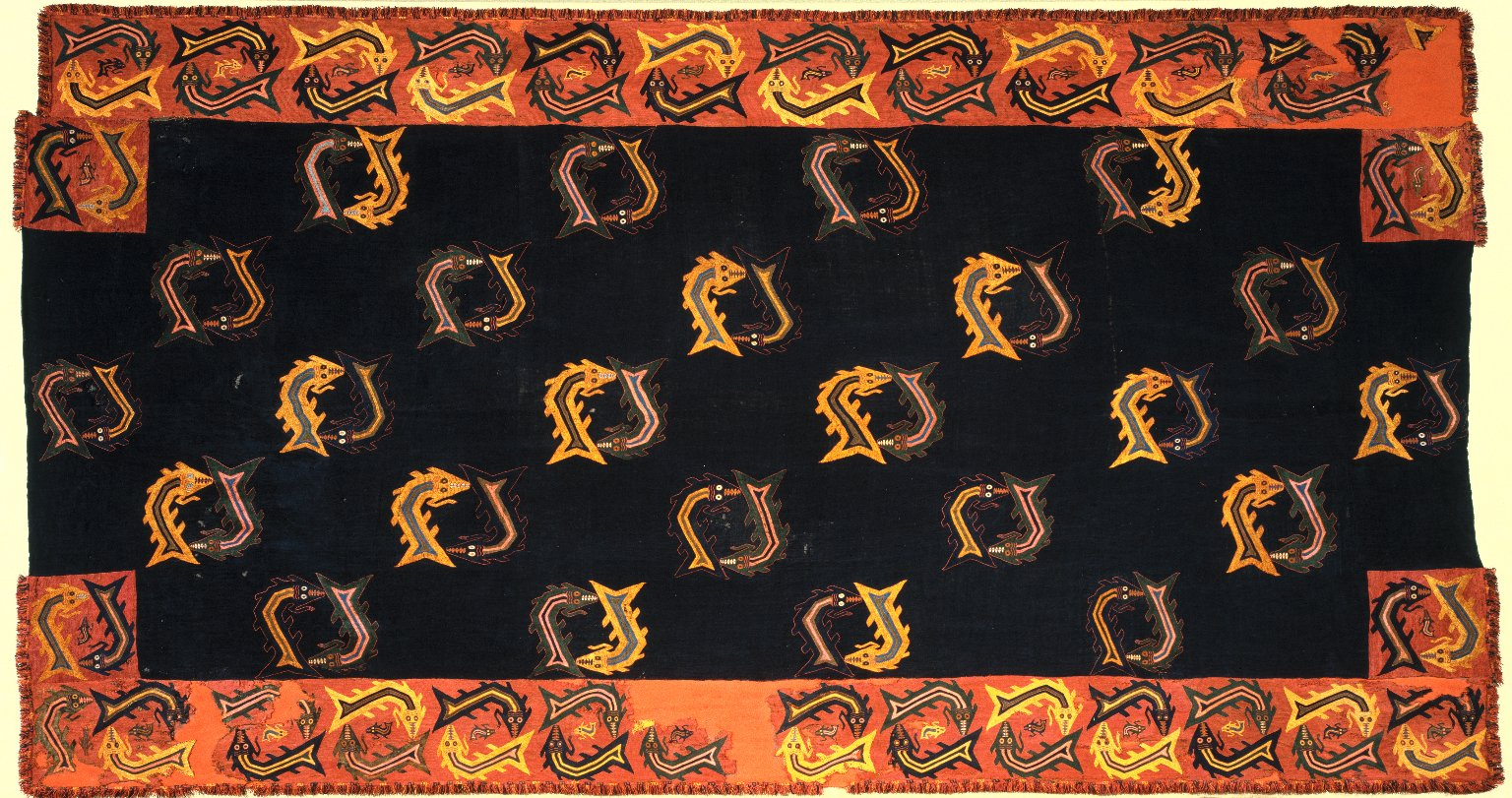
Nazca-Paracas mantle, 1-100 CE, Brooklyn Museum, Brooklyn.

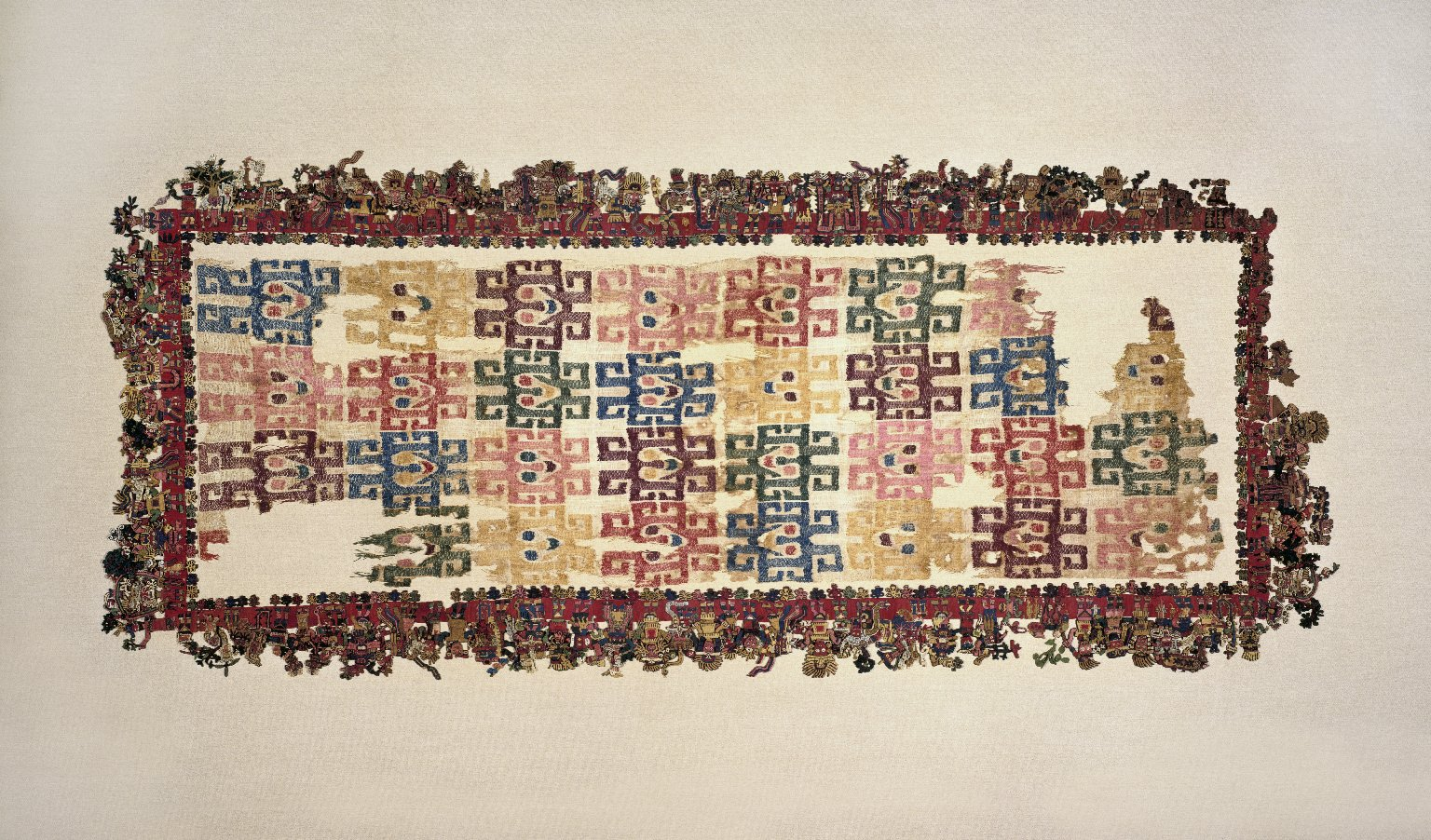
Paracas textile, 100-300 C.E., Brooklyn Museum, Brooklyn.

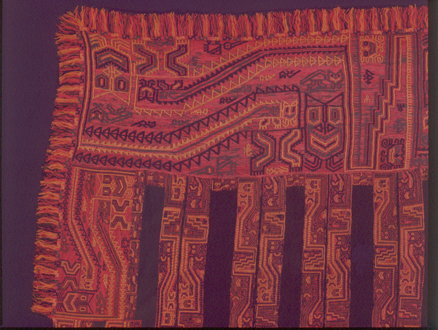
Paracas mantle, c. 200 C.E., Larco Museum, Lima.

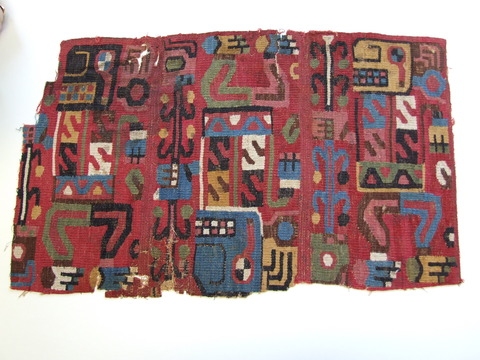
Wari textile fragment, 650-900 C.E., Yale University Art Gallery, New Haven.

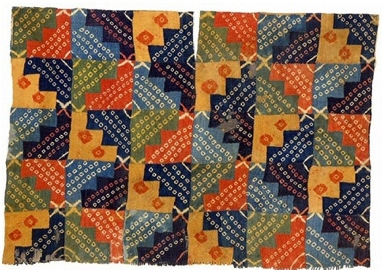
Wari tunic, 750-950 C.E., Textile Museum, Washington, D.C.

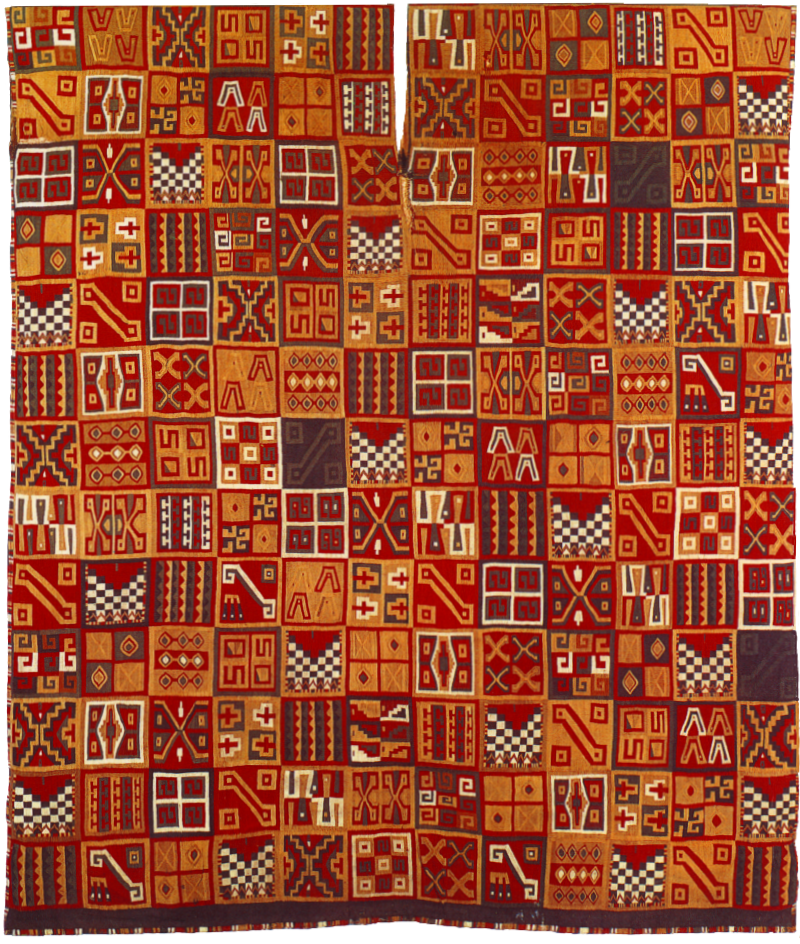
Tupa Inca tunic with Tocapu, c. 1550 C.E., Dumbarton Oaks, Washington, D.C.

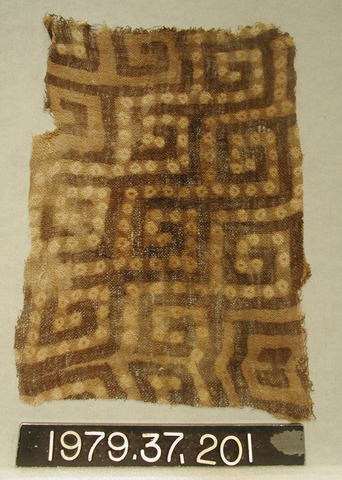
Painted textile fragment, 1000-1476 C.E., Yale University Art Gallery, New Haven.

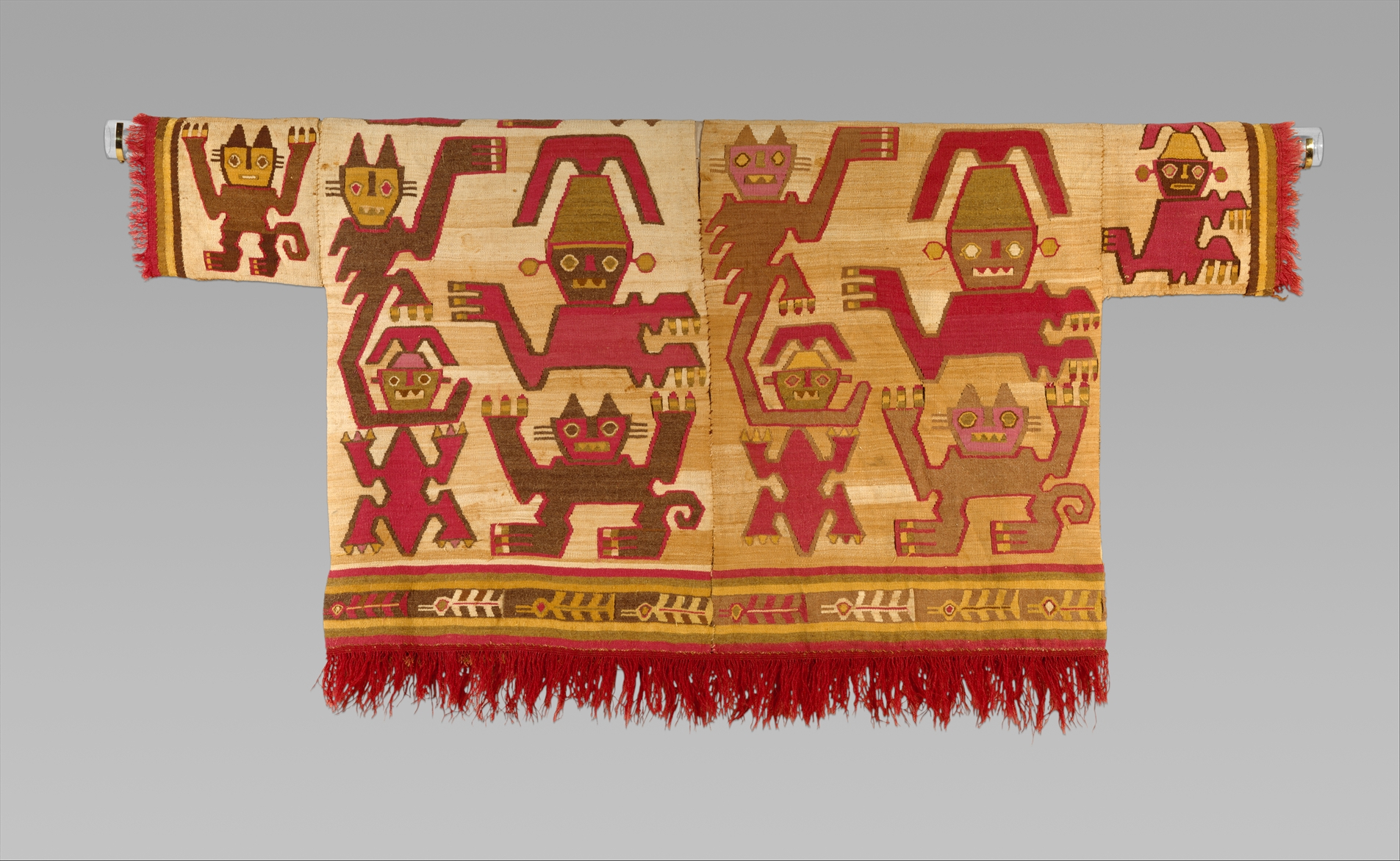
Chimu shirt, 1450-1550 C.E., Metropolitan Museum of Art, New York.

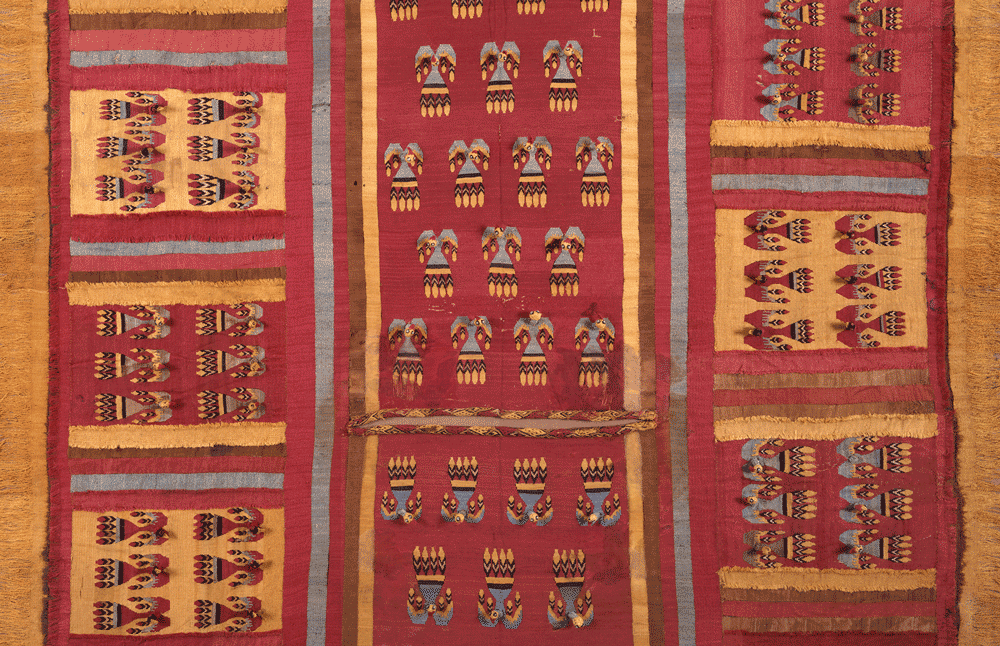
Chancay sleeved tunic with flying condors
