= Quechua I =

Group of Quechuan languages of Peru

- Central Quechua, Waywash Quechua, Quechua B
- Geographic distribution: Central Andes in Peru.
- Ethnicity: Quechua
- Linguistic classification: Quechuan: Quechua I
- Subdivisions: Pacaraos; Central

Language codes
- Glottolog: quec1386 (Quechua I)
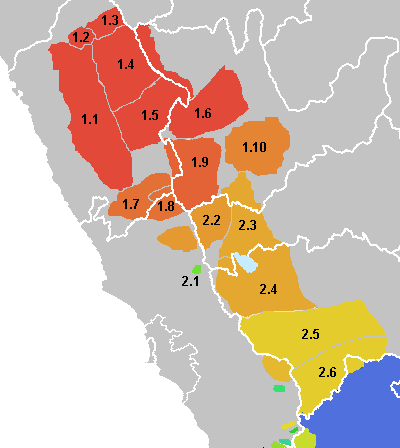

Quechua I, also known as Quechua Wáywash, or Quechua B, is one of the two branches or genealogical groups of the Quechua languages. It is composed of a great diversity of linguistic varieties distributed in the mountains of central Peru, in the departments of Ancash, Huánuco, Pasco, Junín and Lima. This Quechua I differs from the Quechua II by the use of long vowels and in several morphemes. According to the linguists Torero and Carranza, they are older than Quechua II.

== Classification ==
The Quechua of Pacaraos is the most divergent variety of Quechua I, in the first works of Torero was considered within sub-A of Quechua II, the group "of transition", but later works by Adelaar and Taylor allowed it to be located in the branch I. The remaining and majority group, the Quechua central languages in the strict sense, form a dialectal continuum with isoglosses that do not allow dividing into discrete groups. In his seminal work, Torero (1964) delineated eight dialectal varieties, namely:

- Huaylas
- Conchucos
- Western Huayhuash
- Middle Huayhuash
- Oriental Huayhuash
- Mantaro Valley
- Huánuco-Marañón
- Huánuco-Huallaga

Later (1974), Torero presents two ways of grouping these languages. The first, in relation to its proximity to the most extreme dialects, the Callejón de Huaylas and the huanca, nominating both groups as Wáylay and Wánkay respectively. Both would differ in the pluralization of verbs. In parallel, it presents five zones based on the intercommunication of speakers:

- Zone 1: Ancash-Conchucos (Wáylay)
- Zone 2: Alto Marañón-Alto Huaura-Alto Huallaga (Intermediate between Wáylay and Wánkay)
- Zone 3: Yaru
- Zone 4: Jauja-Huanca
- Zone 5: Huangáscar-Topará (eventually immersed in Quechua Yauyino)
