= Huallanca =

Huallanca (Hispanicized spelling) or Wallanka (Quechua for "mountain range") may refer to the following:

- Huallanca District, Bolognesi - a district in the Bolognesi Province of the Ancash Region in Peru
- Huallanca District, Huaylas - a district in the Huaylas Province of the Ancash Region in Peru
- Huallanca (Ayacucho) - a town in the Ayacucho Region in Peru
- Huallanca (Huánuco) - a town in the Huánuco Region in Peru
- Wallanka - a mountain in the Ancash Region in Peru
- Wallanka mountain range - one part of the Cordillera Occidental in the Andes mountain range in western Peru
- Río Huallanca - headwaters of Marañón River (Peru)
