= Kuntur Wayi =

Mountain in Peru

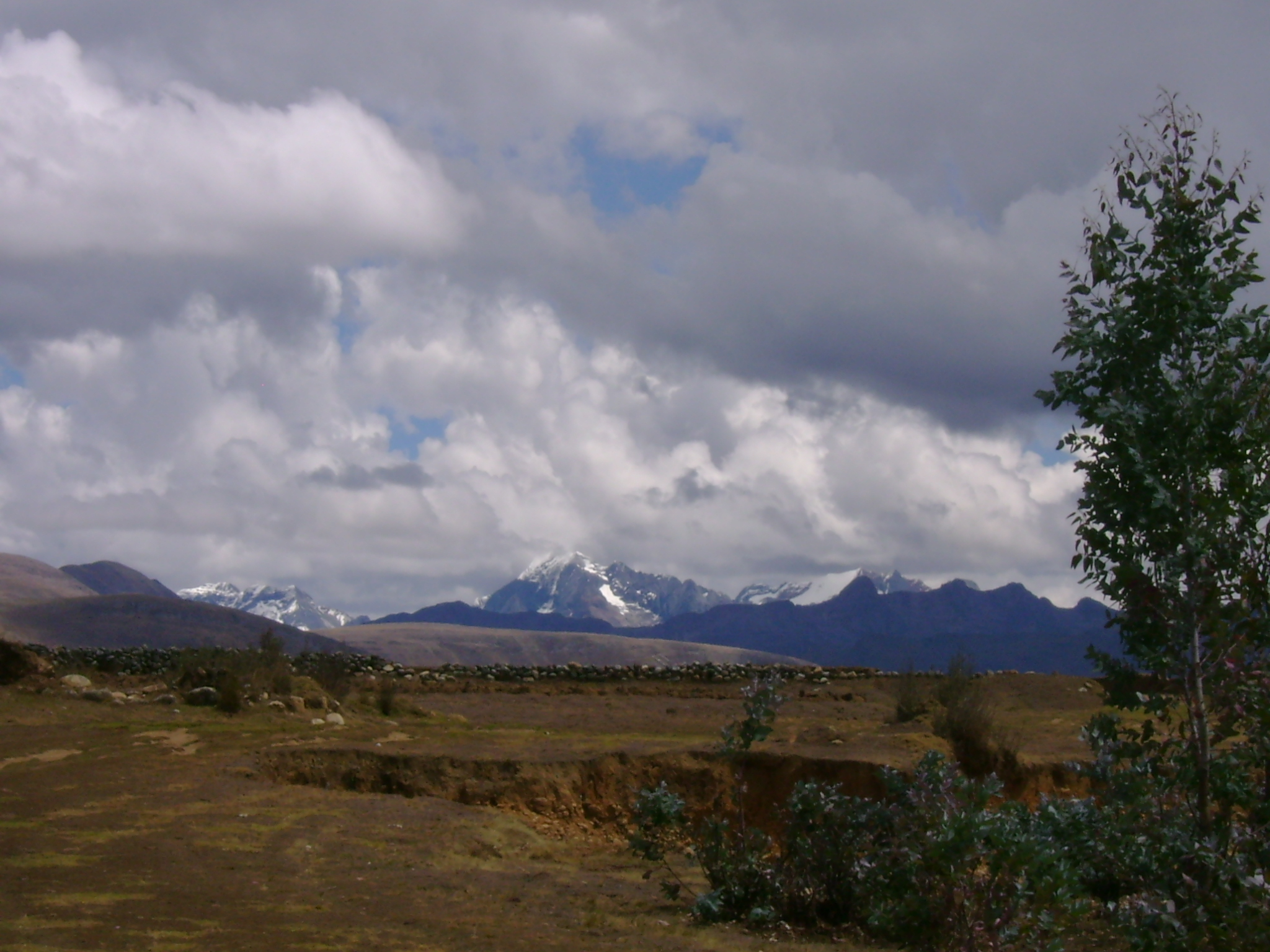
- Kuntur Wayi (on the left), Wallanka and Tankanqucha

Highest point
- Elevation: 5,171 m (16,965 ft)
- Coordinates: 9°56′24″S 77°02′33″W

Geography
- Location within Peru
- Location: Peru, Ancash, Bolognesi Province
- Parent range: Wallanka

Kuntur Wayi or Kuntur Wayin (Quechua kuntur condor, Ancash Quechua wayi house, "condor house", also spelled Condorhuayi, Condor-Huain) is a 5,171-metre-high (16,965 ft) mountain in the Wallanka mountain range in the Andes of Peru. It is situated in the Ancash Region, Bolognesi Province, on the border of the districts of Aquia and Huallanca. Kuntur Wayi lies east of the Minapata valley, southwest of Kunkush, south of Wallanka and southeast of Minapata.
