= Pachapaqui =

Pachapaqui Pacha P'aki
- settlement
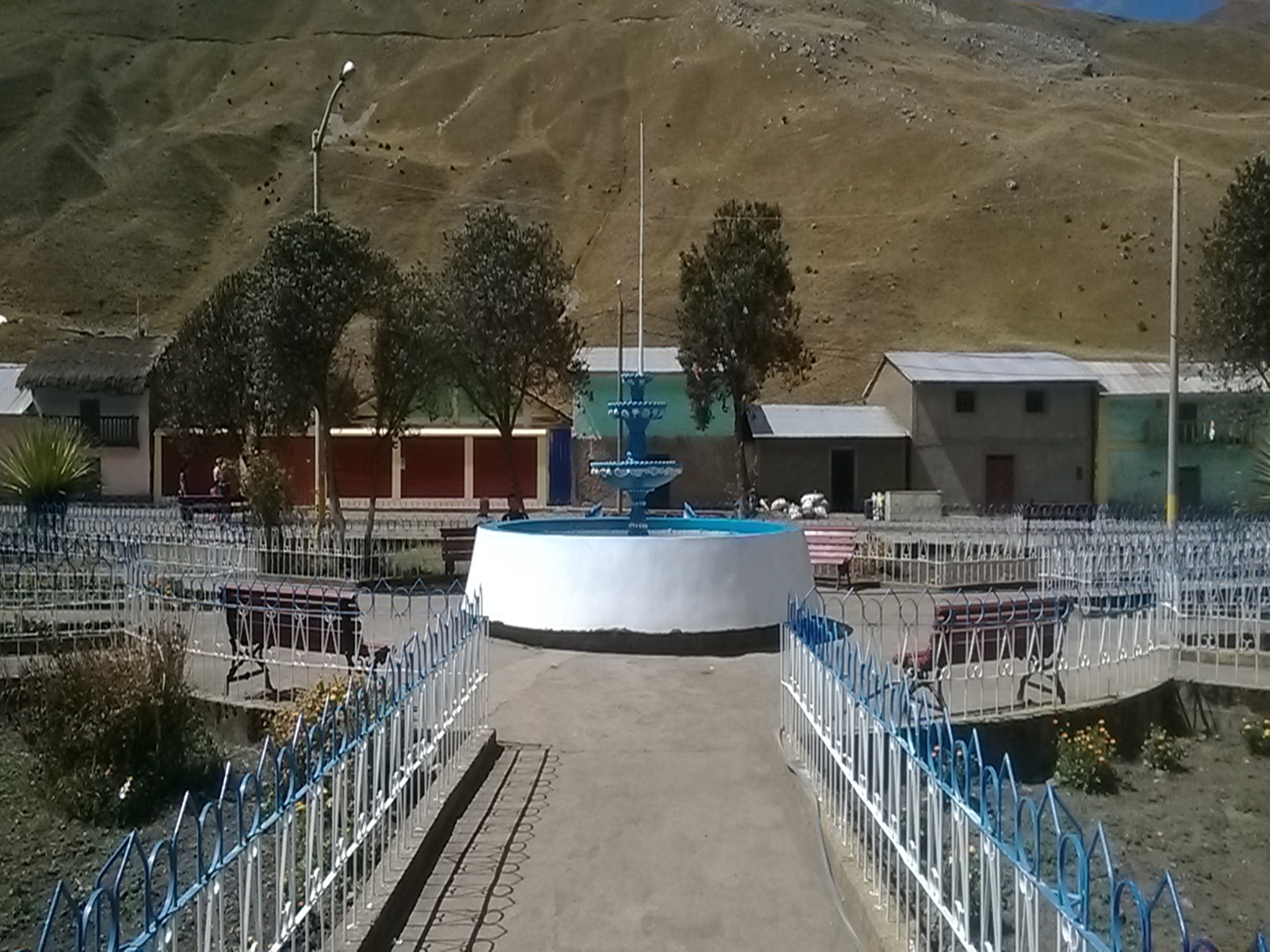
- The main square of Pachapaqui
- Interactive map of Pachapaqui
- Country: Peru
- Region: Ancash
- Province: Bolognesi
- District: Aquia
- Capital: Pachapaqui

Area
  - Total: 326.5 km^{2} (126.1 sq mi)
- Elevation: 3,800 m (12,500 ft)

Population (2007 census)
  - Total: 1,000
  - Density: 3.1/km^{2} (7.9/sq mi)
- Time zone: UTC-5 (PET)
- UBIGEO: 020504

Pachapaqui is a village in the north of Aquia District in the Bolognesi Province of the Ancash Region, Peru. It has about a thousand inhabitants, mostly engaged in raising cattle and sheep, and small-scale agriculture.

== Geography ==
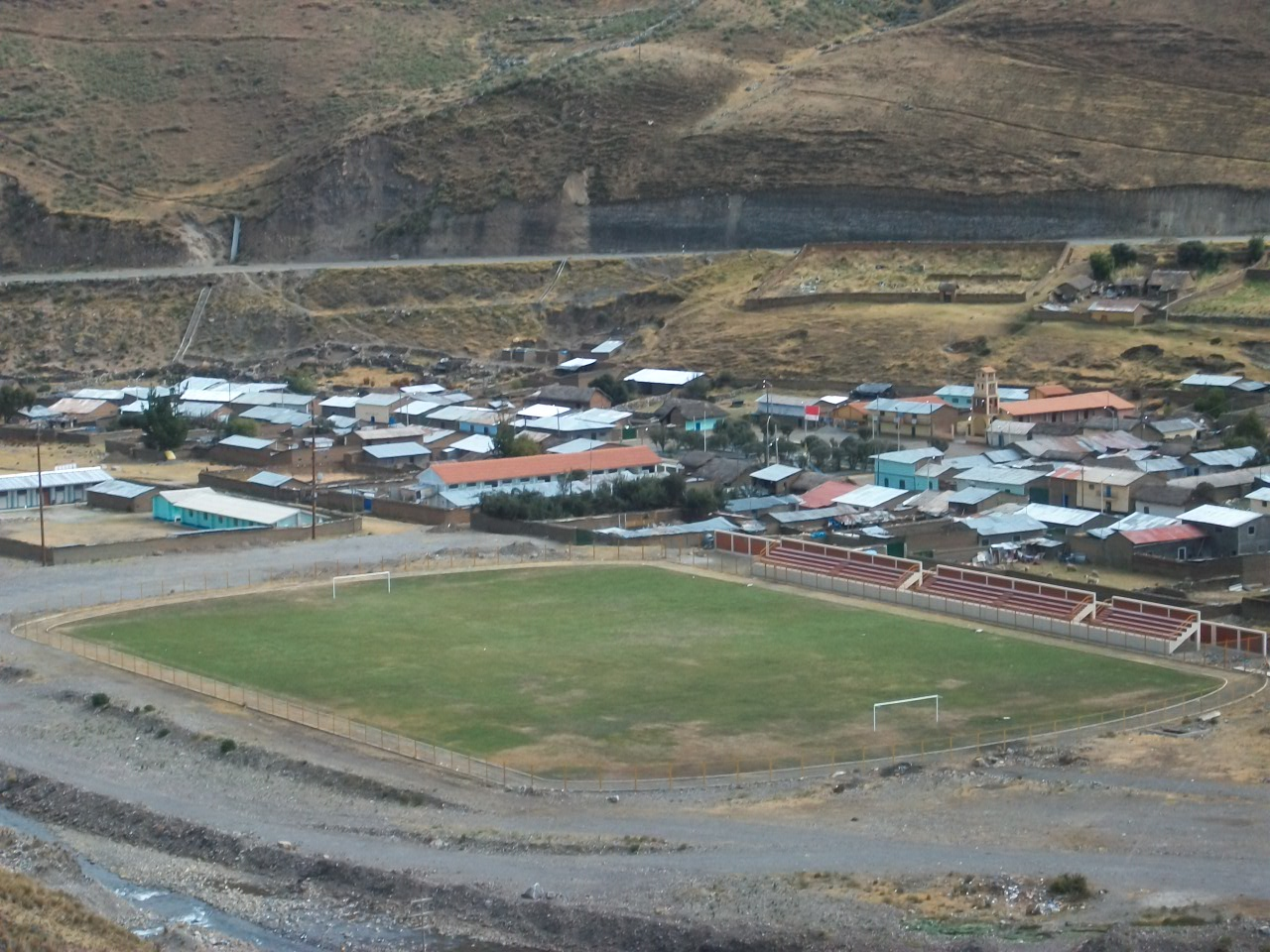
The stadium

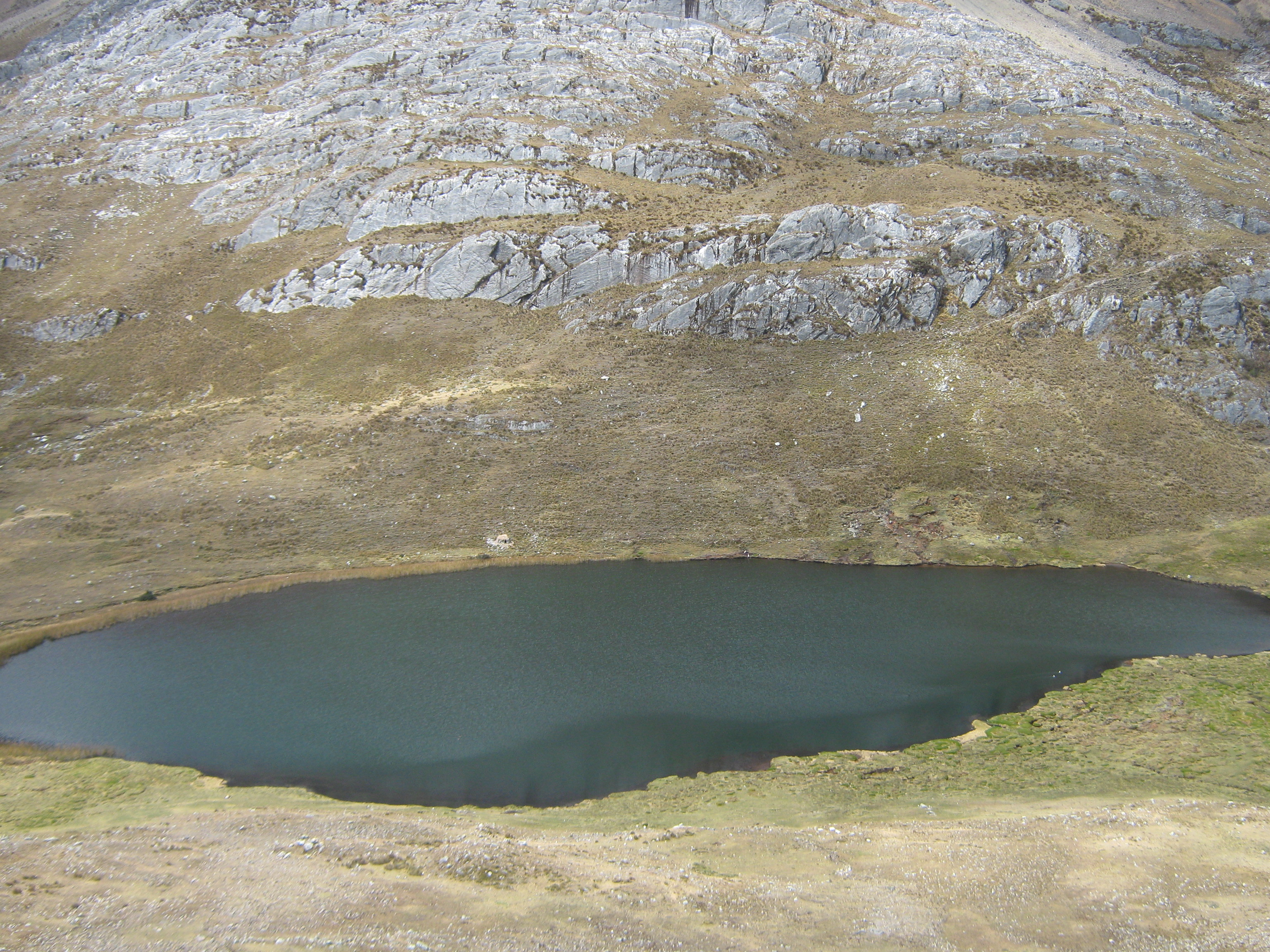
Yanaqucha ("black lake") at the foot of Jupa Tawqaña

=== Location ===
It is located at 3,800 m on a platform of uniform relief, on the western side of the Pativilca River. The distance to Lima is 350 km, to Huaraz in the Callejón de Huaylas 80 km and to Barranca 160 km.

=== Climate ===
Due to its altitude it is located in the Suni or Jalca region according to Javier Pulgar Vidal. The climate is mild and cold with annual temperature of 12 °C, dry during the months of May to October, precipitation from October to April. There may be some frost in June July and August. The rainy season is from December to March. It is characterized by heavy rainfall and occurrences of fog that can stay in the valleys all day long. There is frost in the months from July to September. The rest of the year is dry with mostly sunny days. However, in July and August there may be short rains and clouds.

== Language ==
Fifty years ago, the main language was Quechua, different forms of Ancash Quechua. Now the dominant language is Castilian while Quechua is spoken almost entirely by the elderly due to the recent influx of new residents from the coast who speak only Spanish.

== Tourism ==
- The feast in honor of Sacred Heart from 4 to 8 July.
- The town is a starting point to visit the Puya raimondii.
- Christmas with typical dances of the Ancash Region from 24 to 26 December.

== Communication channels ==
Pachapaqui can be reached as follows:

- Lima: From Lima by Pan-American Highway north to Paramonga (about 200 km) detour to Chasquitambo and ascending by a paved road leading to Conococha and taking the road toward the highway Antamina.
- Huaraz: It comes from Huaraz, by diverting the town of Conococha (4,100 m) take the turn onto the road Antamina.
- Huánuco: From La Union as the previous case, take the bus leaves for the city of Lima.
- In both cases, the roads are paved.
