= Muya Wayin =

Mountain in Peru

- Location within Peru

Highest point
- Elevation: 4,600 m (15,100 ft)
- Coordinates: 9°55′26″S 76°59′41″W

Geography
- Location: Peru, Ancash Region
- Parent range: Andes

Muya Wayin (Quechua muya garden, Ancash Quechua wayi house, "garden house", -n a suffix, also spelled Moyahuain) is a mountain in the eastern extensions of the Wallanka mountain range in the Andes of Peru which reaches a height of approximately 4,600 m (15,092 ft). It is located in the Ancash Region, Bolognesi Province, Huallanca District. Muya Wayin lies on a ridge east of Wallanka, west of Yana Pukyu (Quechua for "black spring").
