= Chancayoc =

Mountain in Peru

- Location within Peru

Highest point
- Elevation: 4,800 m (15,700 ft)
- Coordinates: 10°04′07″S 77°00′58″W

Geography
- Location: Peru, Ancash Region
- Parent range: Andes

Chancayoc or Chhankayuq (Quechua chhanka cliff, Ancash Quechua -yuq a suffix, "the one with a cliff", also spelled Chancayoc) is a mountain in the Andes of Peru which reaches an altitude of approximately 4,800 m (15,700 ft). It is located in the Ancash Region, Bolognesi Province, Huasta District. Chancayoc lies near Pisqan Punta, southwest of the Huallanca mountain range.
