= Yana Jaqhi =

Mountain in Peru

- Location within Peru

Highest point
- Elevation: 4,600 m (15,100 ft)
- Coordinates: 10°01′15″S 77°01′33″W

Geography
- Location: Peru, Ancash Region
- Parent range: Andes, Wallanka

Yana Jaqhi (Aymara yana dark, jaqhi cliff, "dark cliff", hispanicized spelling Yanajaque) is a mountain in the Wallanka mountain range in the Andes of Peru which reaches an altitude of approximately 4,600 m (15,100 ft). It is located in the Ancash Region, Bolognesi Province, Huasta District, west of Chawpi Hanka.
