= Yuraq Kallapu =

Mountain in Peru

- Location within Peru

Highest point
- Elevation: 4,800 m (15,700 ft)
- Coordinates: 10°00′08″S 77°02′26″W

Geography
- Location: Peru, Ancash Region
- Parent range: Andes, Wallanka

Yuraq Kallapu (Quechua yuraq white, Aymara kallapu stairs close to the walls, step of the stairs in a mine; buttress, wood to prop up, possibly meaning "white stairs", Hispanicized spelling Yuraccalapo, Yurajalapu) is a mountain in the Wallanka mountain range in the Andes of Peru which reaches an altitude of approximately 4,800 m (15,700 ft). It is located in the Ancash Region, Bolognesi Province, Huasta District, northwest of Chawpi Hanka.

The name of the mountain correlates with the name of two lakes at its feet, Yuraq Kallapu (Hispanicized Yurac Calapu) and Kallapuyuq ("the one with stairs", also spelled Calupuyoc), and the name of a valley (Calupuyoc).
