= Calapo =

Mountain in Peru

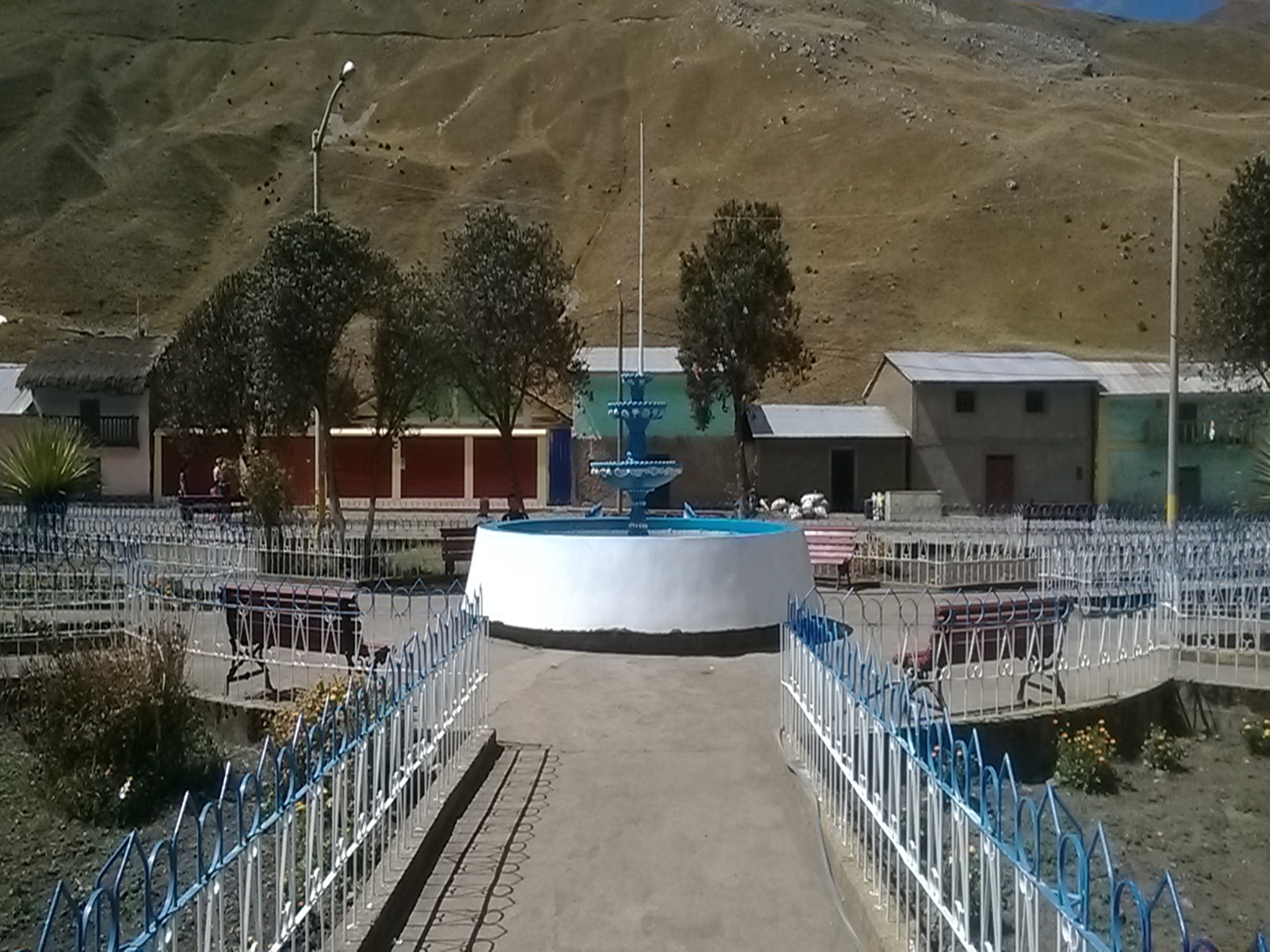
- The main square of Pachapaqui at the foot of Calapo

Highest point
- Elevation: 4,800 m (15,700 ft)
- Coordinates: 09°57′49″S 77°04′23″W

Geography
- Location within Peru
- Location: Peru, Ancash Region
- Parent range: Andes, Huallanca

Calapo or Kallapu (Aymara for stairs close to the walls, a step of the stairs in a mine; buttress, wood to prop up, Hispanicized spelling Calapo) is a mountain in the Huallanca mountain range in the Andes of Peru which reaches an altitude of approximately 4,800 m (15,700 ft). It is located in the Ancash Region, Bolognesi Province, Aquia District, east of the town of Pachapaqui.
