= Chiquián (disambiguation) =

Chiquián can refer to a city and a district in Peru.

For the use of the term in a specific setting, see:

- Chiquián for the town in Peru
- Chiquián District for the district in the Bolognesi province in Ancash
