= Pampacocha (Ancash) =

Lake in Peru

- Location within Peru
- Location: Peru; Ancash Region
- Coordinates: 10°02′05″S 76°58′0.6″W
- Surface area: 0.020234 km^{2} (20,234 m^{2})
- Surface elevation: 4,408 m (14,462 ft)

Pampacocha (possibly from Quechua pampa a large plain, qucha lake, "plain lake") is a lake in the south of the Huallanca mountain range in the Andes of Peru. It is situated at a height of 4,408 m (14,462 ft) comprising an area of 0.020234 km^{2} (20,234 m^{2}). Pampacocha is located in the Ancash Region, Bolognesi Province, Huallanca District, near a lake named Suerococha.
