= Puma Wayin =

Puma Wayin (Quechua puma cougar, puma, Ancash Quechua wayi house, "cougar house", -n a suffix, also spelled Puma Huain, Pumahuain, Pumahuaín, Pumahuayin, Pumahuin) may refer to:

- Puma Wayin (Aija), a mountain in the Aija Province, Ancash Region, Peru
- Puma Wayin (Bolognesi), a mountain near Kunturqucha in the Huallanca District, Bolognesi Province, Ancash Region, Peru
- Puma Wayin (Huallanca), a mountain near Ismu Cruz in the Huallanca District, Bolognesi Province, Ancash Region, Peru.
- Puma Wayin (Huánuco), a mountain in the Huánuco Region, Peru
- Puma Wayin (Recuay), a mountain in the Recuay Province, Ancash Region, Peru
