= Munti Wayi =

Mountain in Peru

- Location within Peru

Highest point
- Elevation: 4,902 m (16,083 ft)
- Coordinates: 9°57′45″S 77°09′05″W

Geography
- Location: Peru, Ancash Region
- Parent range: Andes, Cordillera Blanca

Munti Wayi (Ancash Quechua munti tree, wayi house, "tree house", Hispanicized spelling Monte Huay) is a 4,902-metre-high (16,083 ft) mountain in the Cordillera Blanca in the Andes of Peru. It is located in the Ancash Region, Bolognesi Province, Aquia District. It lies northeast of Rahu Kutaq and southeast of Pastu Ruri.
