= Quntayqucha Punta =

Mountain in Peru

- Location within Peru

Highest point
- Elevation: 4,800 m (15,700 ft)
- Coordinates: 10°02′09″S 77°00′31″W

Geography
- Location: Peru, Ancash Region
- Parent range: Andes, Wallanka

Quntayqucha Punta (Quechua quntay clay, gypsum or magnesia, qucha lake, punta peak, ridge, Hispanicized spelling Contaycocha Punta) is a mountain in the Wallanka mountain range in the Andes of Peru which reaches an altitude of approximately 4,800 m (15,700 ft). It is located in the Ancash Region, Bolognesi Province, Huasta District, southwest of Chawpi Hanka.

The name of the mountain correlates with the name of a small lake at its feet, Quntayqucha (Contaycocha), at 10°02′56″S 77°00′22″W.
