= Chasquitambo =

Location in Ancash, Peru

Coordinates: 10.3133°S 77.6263°W

Chasquitambo (Quechua: Chaskitampu) is a location in the Peruvian Bolognesi Province located in the Ancash Region. It is the seat of the Colquioc District.
