= Pucarajo (Bolognesi-Huari) =

Mountain in Peru

- Location within Peru

Highest point
- Elevation: 5,000 m (16,000 ft)
- Coordinates: 9°49′03″S 77°06′05″W

Geography
- Location: Peru, Ancash Region
- Parent range: Andes

Pucarajo (possibly from Quechua puka red, rahu snow, ice, mountain with snow, "red snow-covered mountain") is a mountain in the Andes of Peru, about 5,000 m (16,404 ft) high. It is situated in the Ancash Region, Bolognesi Province, Huallanca District, and in the Huari Province, San Marcos District. Pucarajo lies northwest of the Yanashallash pass.
