= Puka Hirka =

Puka Hirka or Pukahirka (Quechua puka red, hirka mountain, "red mountain", also spelled Puca Jirca, Pucairca, Pucahirca, Pucajirca) may refer to:

- Pukahirka, a mountain in the provinces of Huaylas and Pomabamba, Ancash Region, Peru
- Puka Hirka (Aija-Recuay), a mountain in the provinces of Aija and Recuay, Ancash Region, Peru
- Puka Hirka (Bolognesi), a mountain in the Bolognesi Province, Ancash Region, Peru
- Puka Hirka (Corongo), a mountain in the Corongo Province, Ancash Region, Peru
- Puka Hirka (Huánuco), a mountain in the Huánuco Region, Peru
- Puka Hirka (Huaraz-Yungay), a mountain in the provinces of Huaraz and Yungay, Ancash Region, Peru
