= C. canis =

C. canis may refer to:

- Carasobarbus canis, a ray-finned fish species found in Israel, Jordan and Syria
- Ctenocephalides canis, the dog flea, a flea species that dwells primarily on the blood of dogs

== See also ==
- Canis (disambiguation)
