= Rumi Wayin Punta =

Mountain in Peru

- Location within Peru

Highest point
- Elevation: 4,600 m (15,100 ft)
- Coordinates: 10°09′56″S 77°11′39″W

Geography
- Location: Peru, Ancash Region
- Parent range: Andes

Rumi Wayin Punta (quechua rumi stone, Ancash Quechua wayi house, -n a suffix, punta peak; ridge, "stone house peak (or ridge)", also spelled Rumihuainpunta) is a mountain in the Andes of Peru which reaches a height of approximately 4,600 m (15,100 ft). It is located in the Ancash Region, Bolognesi Province, Chiquian District, southwest of Chiquian.
