= Pisqan Punta =

Mountain in Peru

- Location within Peru

Highest point
- Elevation: 4,800 m (15,700 ft)
- Coordinates: 10°03′47″S 77°00′42″W

Geography
- Location: Peru, Ancash Region
- Parent range: Andes, Wallanka

Pisqan Punta (Quechua pichqa, pisqa five, -n a suffix, punta peak; ridge, hispanicized spelling Pisccanpunta, Pisjanpunta) is a mountain in the southernmost part of the Wallanka mountain range in the Andes of Peru which reaches an altitude of approximately 4,800 m (15,700 ft). It is located in the Ancash Region, Bolognesi Province, Huasta District. Pisqan Punta lies at the Quntayqucha valley, southwest of a lake named Quntayqucha.

== Name ==
The name Pisqan Punta derives from the Quechua language, where pisqa (or pichqa) means “five”, and the suffix -n is often used as a grammatical ending. The word punta means “peak”, “ridge”, or “point”.

Thus, the name can be interpreted as “the fifth peak” or “the peak of five”.
