= Yana Hirka =

Yana Hirka (Quechua: yana black, hirka mountain, "black mountain", also spelled Yanairca, Yanajirca) may refer to:

- Yana Hirka (Ancash), a mountain in the Ancash Region, Peru
- Yana Hirka (Huánuco), a mountain in the Huánuco Region, Peru
- Yana Hirka (Lima), a mountain in the Lima Region, Peru
