= Kunkush (Bolognesi) =

Mountain in Peru

- Location within Peru

Highest point
- Elevation: 4,626 m (15,177 ft)
- Coordinates: 9°55′03″S 77°0′33″W

Geography
- Location: Peru, Ancash, Bolognesi Province
- Parent range: Wallanka

Kunkush (Ancash Quechua for Puya raimondii, Hispanicized spelling Cuncush) is a 4,626-metre-high (15,177 ft) mountain in the Wallanka mountain range in the Andes of Peru. It is situated in the Ancash Region, Bolognesi Province, Huallanca District. Kunkush lies at the Ch'uspi valley on an eastern extension of the range, west of Tuna Wayin, Yana Puyku and Muya Wayin and east of Wallanka.
