= Munti Hirka =

Mountain in Peru

- Location within Peru

Highest point
- Elevation: 4,400 m (14,400 ft)
- Coordinates: 9°57′05″S 76°58′29″W

Geography
- Location: Peru, Ancash Region
- Parent range: Andes, Wallanka mountain range

Munti Hirka (Ancash Quechua munti tree, hirka mountain, "tree mountain", also spelled Montejirca) is a mountain in the eastern extensions of the Wallanka mountain range in the Andes of Peru which reaches a height of approximately 4,400 m (14,400 ft). It is located in the Ancash Region, Bolognesi Province, Huallanca District.
