= M. canis =

M. canis may refer to:

- Microsporum canis, a fungus species that causes Tinea capitis in humans
- Mustelus canis, the dusky smooth-hound or smooth dogfish, a hound shark species
  - Mustelus canis canis, an M. canis subspecies
  - Mustelus canis insularis

== See also ==
- Canis (disambiguation)
