= Huallanca (mountain) =

Mountain in Peru

- Burro
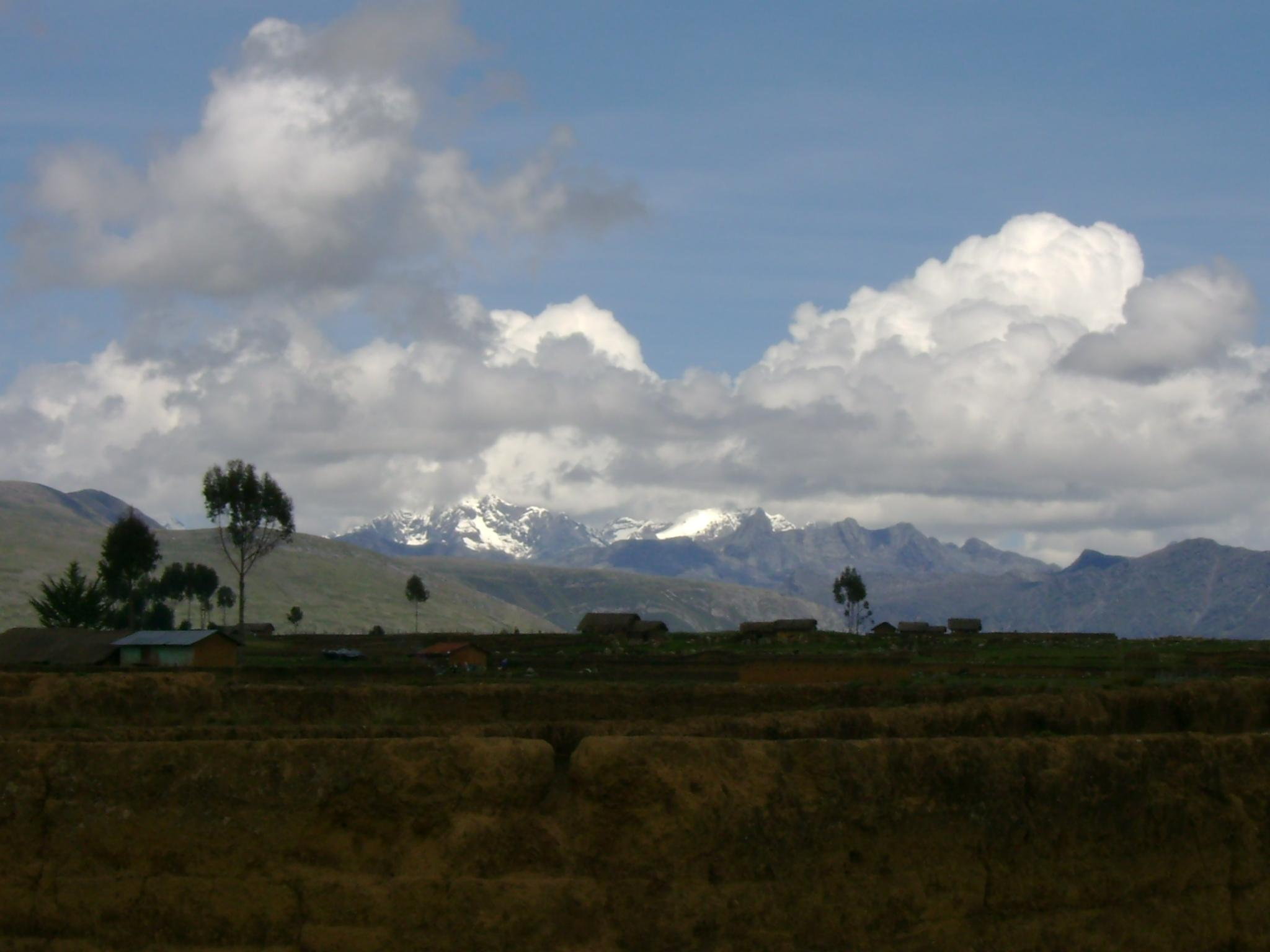
- Huallanca (on the left) as seen from Wanuku Pampa

Highest point
- Elevation: 5,470 m (17,950 ft)
- Coordinates: 9°55′11″S 77°02′13″W

Geography
- Location within Peru
- Location: Peru, Ancash Region
- Parent range: Huallanca mountain range

Climbing
- First ascent: 1968

Huallanca (possibly from Quechua for "mountain range" and a cactus plant (Opuntia subulata)), also known as Burro (Spanish for "donkey"), is a 5,470 m (17,950 ft)) high mountain in the Andes of Peru. It is the highest peak in the Huallanca mountain range. Huallanca is located in the Ancash Region, Bolognesi Province, in the districts of Aquia and Huallanca. It is situated in the northern half of the range, southeast of the Yanashallash pass and the peaks of Tankan, Ch'uspi and Tankanqucha. Kuntur Wayi lies southwest of it. Winchus 4,795 m (15,732 ft)) is the peak west of Wallanka at the Tuna Kancha valley.
