= Chawpi Punta =

Mountain in Peru

- Location within Peru

Highest point
- Elevation: 4,600 m (15,100 ft)
- Coordinates: 10°06′56″S 77°01′27″W

Geography
- Location: Peru, Ancash Region
- Parent range: Andes

Chawpi Punta (Quechua chawpi center, middle, punta peak; ridge, "central peak (or ridge)", also spelled Chaupipunta) is a mountain in the Andes of Peru which reaches an altitude of approximately 4,600 m (15,100 ft). It is located in the Ancash Region, Bolognesi Province, Huasta District. Chawpi Punta lies at the Pampa Wayi valley, southwest of Puka Qaqa (Quechua for "red rock").
