= Tawqan =

Mountain in Peru

- Location within Peru

Highest point
- Elevation: 5,200 m (17,100 ft)
- Coordinates: 09°58′41″S 77°01′23″W

Geography
- Location: Peru, Ancash Region
- Parent range: Andes, Wallanka

Tawqan (Quechua tawqa heap, pile, -n a suffix, Hispanicized spelling Taucán) is a mountain in the Wallanka mountain range in the Andes of Peru which reaches an altitude of approximately 5,200 m (17,100 ft). It is located in the Ancash Region, Bolognesi Province, in the districts of Aquia, Huallanca and Huasta, northwest of Chawpi Hanka.

The name of the mountain correlates with the name of a small lake at its feet at 9°59′00″S 77°00′26″W, Tawqanqucha in Quechua (Hispanicized Laguna Taucán or Laguna Aguascocha Superior). Awasqucha (Laguna Aguascocha Inferior) lies immediately east of it. This is where the Ch'iyar Juqhu River (Aymara for "black swamp", also spelled Chiurucu, Chiúrucu, Chuirucu) originates. Its waters flow to the Marañón River.
