= Huasta District =

Coordinates: 10.12385°S 77.1573°W

Huasta
- District
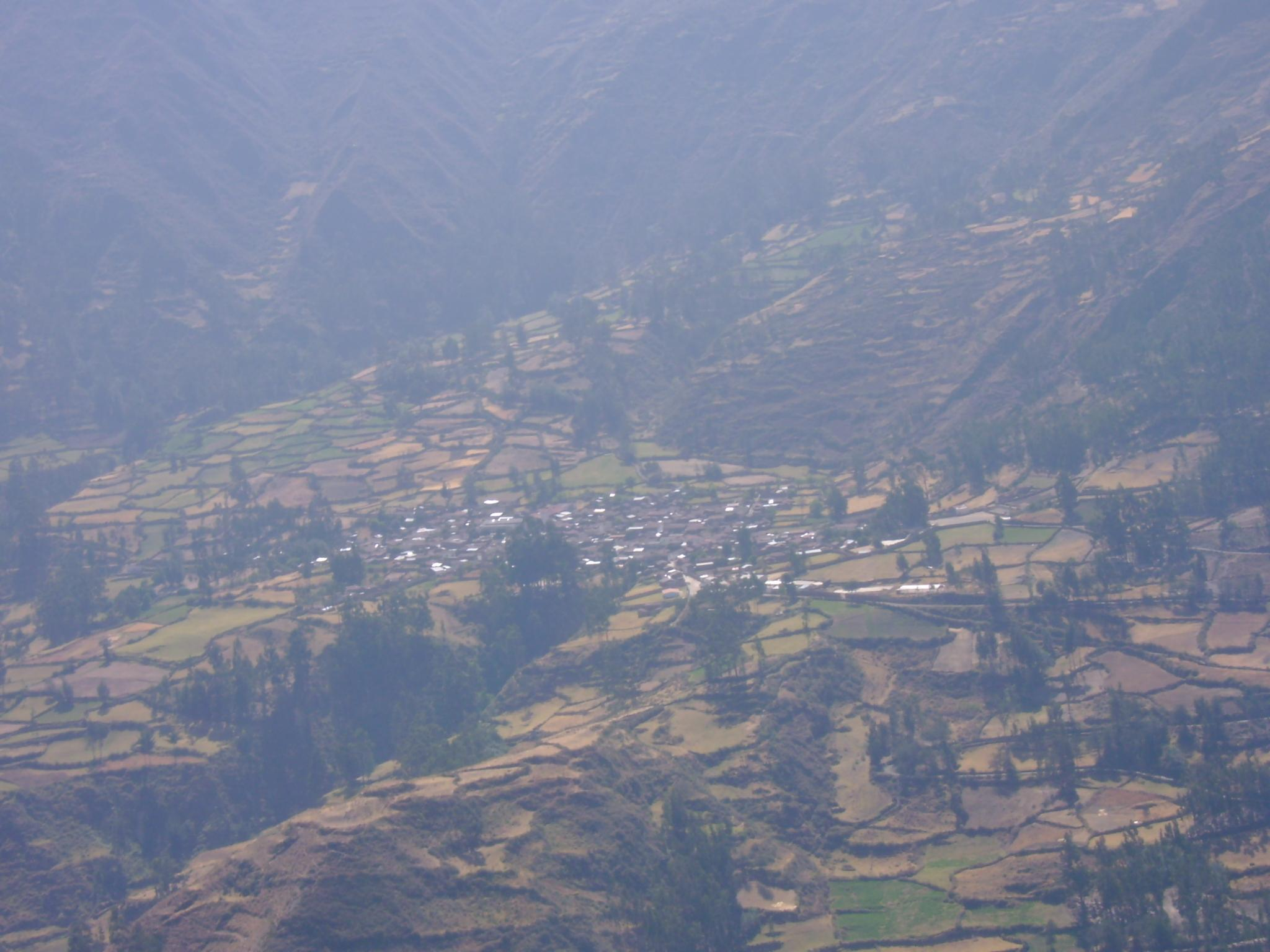
- Interactive map of Huasta
- Country: Peru
- Region: Ancash
- Province: Bolognesi
- Founded: January 28, 1863
- Capital: Huasta

Government
  - Mayor: Teofanes Alva Valderrama

Area
  - Total: 387.91 km^{2} (149.77 sq mi)
- Elevation: 3,385 m (11,106 ft)

Population (2005 census)
  - Total: 2,278
  - Density: 5.872/km^{2} (15.21/sq mi)
- Time zone: UTC-5 (PET)
- UBIGEO: 020509

Huasta is a district of the province of Bolognesi, in the Ancash Region of Peru. The capital of Huasta is "Villa de Huasta" and the Temple is located in the Jr Grau in front of the "Seat of Arms", a monument declared by Supreme Resolution Nº 505-74-ED dated 15 October 1974. Huasta is on a plain 3,375 meters above sea level on the left banks of the river Chiquián. The seat of arms is located at the town center and there are four longitudinal streets and seven cross-sectional streets, all paved with stones.

== Geography ==
The Wallanka mountain range traverses the district. Some of the highest peaks of the district are listed below:

- Asulqucha
- Chakra Chakra
- Chawpi Hanka
- Chawpi Hanka (Anc.-Huán.)
- Chawpi Punta
- Chhankayuq
- Kushuru
- Khuchi Mach'ay
- K'uchu Punta
- Pisqan Punta
- Puka Punta
- Puka Qaqa
- Pukash Punta
- Qawi
- Quntayqucha Punta
- Shumaq
- Tawqan
- Tunash Punta
- Wamash Mach'ay
- Yana Hirka
- Yana Jaqhi
- Yuraq Kallapu

== History ==
The district of Huasta was created by law of October 28, 1863, and Villa de Huasta became the capital by law of November 15, 1909. There is no documentary evidence for the Spanish foundation but it is generally supposed that Huasta was founded by the Spaniards between years 1535 and 1540 along with many other towns founded by missionaries of the Spanish king. It is considered possible that Huasta was colonized by the Dominicans.

== Catholic influence ==
Construction of the Temple of Huasta began in 1575 while Felipe II was king of Spain, a period of much catholic evangelism in Peru. The religious work was in the hands of Archbishop Toribio, Rodriguez de Mendoza, during the mandate of 5th Virrey of Peru Don Francisco Toledo.

The Church, which dates from the 16th century, is in the colonial style with a fusion of Hispanic and Peruvian art. The ceilings are of wood with clay roofing tiles. The facade has images of San Pedro, San Pablo, San Francisco and the Virgin Maria with angels,. At the top is the Eternal Father. The main tower, with three bells which replaced the original Mariangolas bells, collapsed as a result of the earthquake of 1970. In the entranceway to the front door of the Temple can be seen two holes which previously held two logs used to discipline felons, this was called "the Trap".
