= Yanajirca (Huallanca) =

Mountain in Peru

- Location within Peru

Highest point
- Elevation: 4,600 m (15,100 ft)
- Coordinates: 10°03′22″S 76°57′33″W

Geography
- Location: Peru, Ancash Region
- Parent range: Andes

Yanajirca or Yana Hirka (Quechua yana black, Ancash Quechua hirka mountain, "black mountain", also spelled Yanajirca) is a mountain in the Andes of Peru which reaches an altitude of approximately 4,600 m (15,100 ft). It is located in the Ancash Region, Bolognesi Province, Huallanca District. Yana Hirka lies southeast of the Wallanka mountain range.
