= Yanaqucha (Bolognesi) =

Lake in Peru

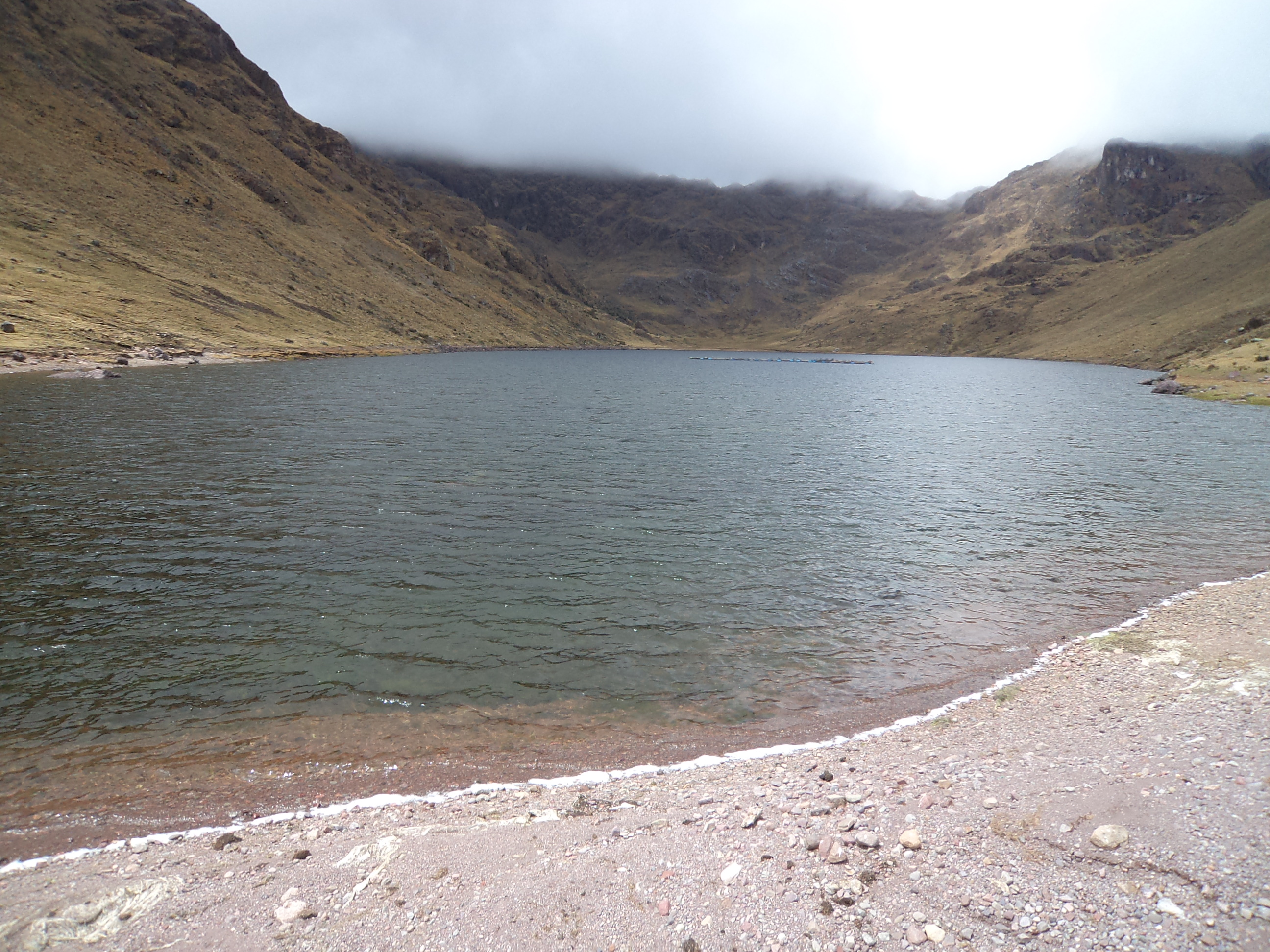

- Location within Peru
- Location: Peru; Ancash Region
- Coordinates: 10°02′32.4″S 77°12′30.1″W
- Surface area: 0.186192 km^{2} (186,192 m^{2})
- Surface elevation: 4,373 m (14,347 ft)

Yanaqucha (Quechua yana black, qucha lake, "black lake") also spelled Yanacocha, is a lake in the Andes of Peru. It is situated at a height of 4,373 m (14,347 ft) comprising an area of 0.186192 km^{2} (186,192 m^{2}). Yanaqucha is located in the Aquia District, Bolognesi Province, and Ancash Region. The lake receives water from the Yanaqucha brook, which originates southwest of the peak of Rahu Kutaq.
