= Inca Huagansa =

Mountain in Peru

- Location within Peru

Highest point
- Elevation: 4,000 m (13,000 ft)
- Coordinates: 10°09′41″S 77°19′05″W

Geography
- Location: Peru, Ancash Region
- Parent range: Andes

Inca Huagansa or Inka Waqanqa (quechua inka Inca, waqay to cry, -nqa a suffix, "the Inca will cry", erroneously also spelled Inca Huagansa, a meaningless term) is a mountain in the Andes of Peru which reaches a height of approximately 4,000 m (13,000 ft). It is located in the Ancash Region, Bolognesi Province, Cajacay District. It lies south of a place named Inca Huacanca (also quechua Inka Waqanqa).
