= Cajacay District =

Coordinates: 10°08′26″S 77°26′36″W

Cajacay
- District
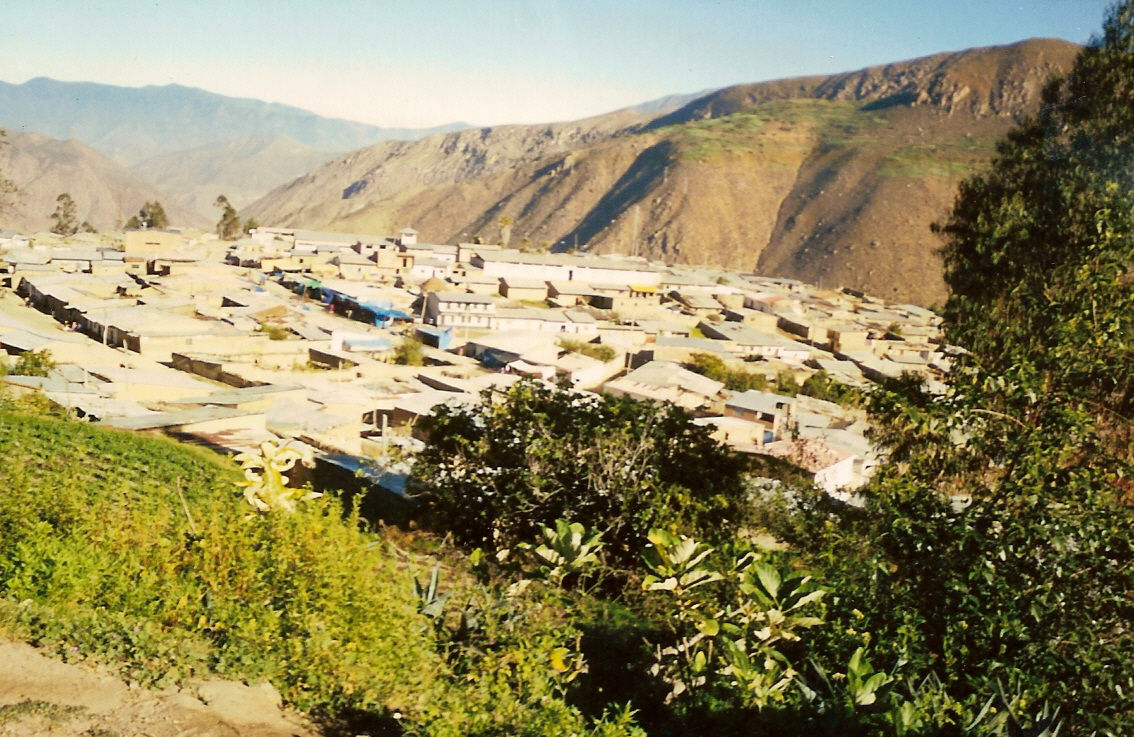
- Interactive map of Cajacay
- Country: Peru
- Region: Ancash
- Province: Bolognesi
- Founded: January 2, 1857
- Capital: Cajacay

Government
  - Mayor: Joaquin Edmundo Castillo Sarazu

Area
  - Total: 193.06 km^{2} (74.54 sq mi)
- Elevation: 2,599 m (8,527 ft)

Population (2005 census)
  - Total: 1,748
  - Density: 9.054/km^{2} (23.45/sq mi)
- Time zone: UTC-5 (PET)
- UBIGEO: 020505

Cajacay District ([kaˈxakaj]) is one of fifteen districts of the Bolognesi Province in Peru.

== Geography ==
One of the highest peaks of the district is Kushuru Punta at approximately 4,800 m (15,700 ft). Other mountains are listed below:

- Chakwa Pukyu
- Ch'illka Raqra
- Hatun Punta
- Hirkan Wayi
- Ichik Punta
- Inka Waqanqa
- Kima Wank'a
- Mina Punta
- Pichaq Wayin
- Qucha Marka
- Quraw
- Tuku Wachanan
- Yana Punta
- Yuraq Punta
