= Lake Niancocha =

Lake in Huanuco, Peru

- Location within Peru Location within South America
- Interactive map of Lake Niancocha
- Location: Peru; Ancash Region
- Coordinates: 10°04′57.1″S 76°52′4.6″W

Lake Niancocha (possibly from Quechua nina fire qucha lake,) is a lake in the Huallanca District of Bolognesi Province, in Peru's Ancash Region. It is northeast of the Cordillera Huayhuash, south of Lake Condorcocha and northwest of Mount Chonta.
