= Abelardo Pardo Lezameta District =

Coordinates: 10°21′S 77°15′W

Abelardo Pardo Lezameta Llaqlla
- District
- Interactive map of Abelardo Pardo Lezameta
- Country: Peru
- Region: Ancash
- Province: Bolognesi
- Founded: January 28, 1956
- Capital: Llaclla

Government
  - Mayor: Maximo Pelayo Bravo Laus

Area
  - Total: 11.31 km^{2} (4.37 sq mi)
- Elevation: 2,096 m (6,877 ft)

Population (2005 census)
  - Total: 262
  - Density: 23.2/km^{2} (60.0/sq mi)
- Time zone: UTC-5 (PET)
- UBIGEO: 020502

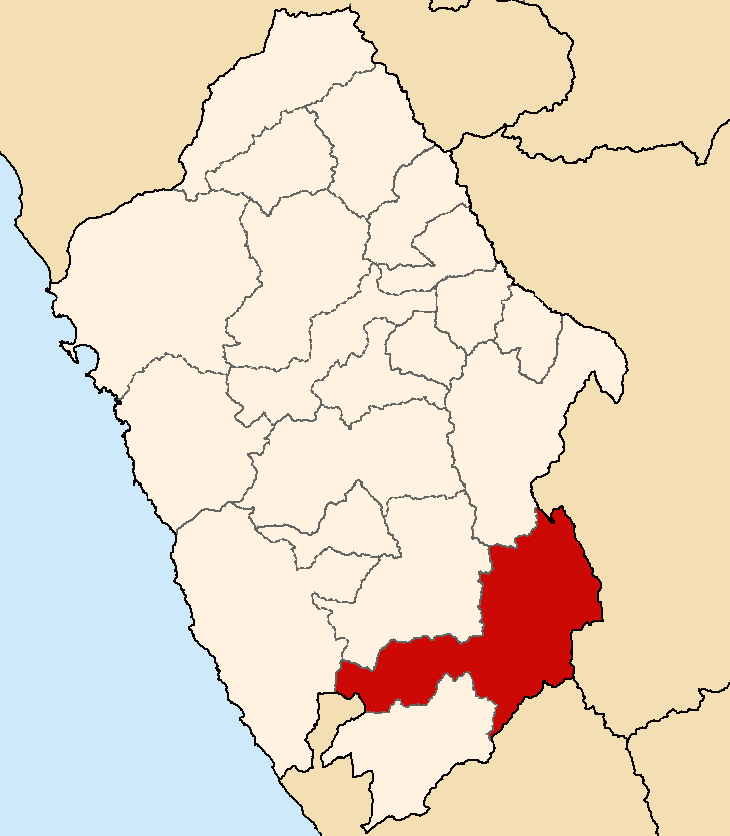
Location of the province Bolognesi in Ancash

Abelardo Pardo Lezameta District is one of fifteen districts of the province Bolognesi in Peru.
