= Aquia District =

Coordinates: 10°04′59″S 77°07′59″W

Aquia
- District
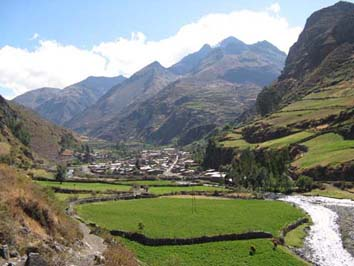
- Aquia with the mountain Kikash in the background
- Interactive map of Aquia
- Country: Peru
- Region: Ancash
- Province: Bolognesi
- Founded: January 2, 1857
- Capital: Aquia

Government
  - Mayor: Ivo Dominovich Acuña Tapia

Area
  - Total: 434.6 km^{2} (167.8 sq mi)
- Elevation: 3,337 m (10,948 ft)

Population (2017)
  - Total: 2,062
  - Density: 4.745/km^{2} (12.29/sq mi)
- Time zone: UTC-5 (PET)
- UBIGEO: 020504

Aquia District is one of fifteen districts of the province Bolognesi in Peru.

== Geography ==
The Cordillera Blanca and the Wallanka mountain range traverse the district. Some of the highest peaks of the district are listed below:

- Challwa
- Ch'uspi
- Jupa Tawqaña
- Kallapu
- Kikash
- Kinwa Kuta
- Kuntur Wayi
- Minapata
- Mulli Mach'ay
- Munti Wayi
- Muntiyuq
- Pastu Ruri
- Puka Hirka
- Rahu Kutaq
- Shikra Shikra
- Tankan
- Tankanqucha
- Tawqan
- Tuku
- Wallanka
- Wamanripa
- Watiyaqucha
- Yanashallash

== See also ==
- Yanaqucha
