= Millwa Qaqa =

Mountain in Peru

- Location within Peru

Highest point
- Elevation: 4,600 m (15,100 ft)
- Coordinates: 9°51′12″S 76°58′55″W

Geography
- Location: Peru, Ancash Region
- Parent range: Andes

Millwa Qaqa (Ancash Quechua millma, millwa wool, qaqa rock, "wool rock", also spelled Millhuagaga) is a mountain in the Andes of Peru which reaches a height of approximately 4,600 m (15,100 ft). It is located in the Ancash Region, Bolognesi Province, Huallanca District.
