= San Miguel de Corpanqui District =

Coordinates: 10.285083°S 77.1987°W

San Miguel de Corpanqui
- District
- Interactive map of San Miguel de Corpanqui
- Country: Peru
- Region: Ancash
- Province: Bolognesi
- Founded: October 15, 1954
- Capital: Corpanqui

Government
  - Mayor: José Manuel Solis Obregon

Area
  - Total: 43.78 km^{2} (16.90 sq mi)
- Elevation: 3,379 m (11,086 ft)

Population (2005 census)
  - Total: 359
  - Density: 8.20/km^{2} (21.2/sq mi)
- Time zone: UTC-5 (PET)
- UBIGEO: 020514

San Miguel de Corpanqui District is one of fifteen districts of the province Bolognesi in Peru.

== See also ==
- Shinwaqucha
