= Kushuru Punta =

Mountain in Peru

- Location within Peru

Highest point
- Elevation: 4,800 m (15,700 ft)
- Coordinates: 10°15′54″S 77°16′30″W

Geography
- Location: Peru, Ancash Region
- Parent range: Andes

Kushuru Punta (Ancash Quechua kushuru an edible kind of seaweed, punta peak; ridge, "kushuru peak (or ridge)", also spelled Cushuropunta) is a mountain in the Andes of Peru which reaches a height of approximately 4,800 m (15,700 ft). It is located in the Ancash Region, Bolognesi Province, Cajacay District and in the Ocros Province, Cajamarquilla District. The small lake northwest of the mountain is named Kushuruqucha ("kushuru lake", erroneously spelled Cashurococha).
