= La Primavera District =

Coordinates: 10°24′00″S 77°10′59″W

La Primavera
- District
- Interactive map of La Primavera
- Country: Peru
- Region: Ancash
- Province: Bolognesi
- Founded: September 21, 1985
- Capital: Gorgorillo

Government
  - Mayor: Juscelino Ruiz Atachagua

Area
  - Total: 68.61 km^{2} (26.49 sq mi)
- Elevation: 2,644 m (8,675 ft)

Population (2005 census)
  - Total: 315
  - Density: 4.59/km^{2} (11.9/sq mi)
- Time zone: UTC-5 (PET)
- UBIGEO: 020511

La Primavera District is one of fifteen districts of the province Bolognesi in Peru.
