= Colquioc District =

Coordinates: 10°18′S 77°36′W

Colquioc Qullqiyuq
- District
- Interactive map of Colquioc
- Country: Peru
- Region: Ancash
- Province: Bolognesi
- Founded: January 29, 1965
- Capital: Chasquitambo

Government
  - Mayor: Guillermo Carlos Pariasca Dextre

Area
  - Total: 274.61 km^{2} (106.03 sq mi)
- Elevation: 743 m (2,438 ft)

Population (2017 census)
  - Total: 1,972
  - Density: 7.181/km^{2} (18.60/sq mi)
- Time zone: UTC-5 (PET)
- UBIGEO: 020507

Colquioc (Hispanicized spelling of the Quechua term Qullqiyuq, qullqi silver, -yuq a suffix, "the one with silver") is one of the fifteen districts of the province Bolognesi in Peru.
