= Yuraq Punta (Ancash) =

Mountain in Peru

- Location within Peru

Highest point
- Elevation: 4,800 m (15,700 ft)
- Coordinates: 10°16′07″S 77°17′27″W

Geography
- Location: Peru, Ancash Region
- Parent range: Andes

Yuraq Punta (Quechua yuraq white, punta peak; ridge, "white peak (or ridge)", also spelled Yuracpunta) is a mountain in the Andes of Peru which reaches a height of approximately 4,800 m (15,700 ft). It is located in the Ancash Region, Bolognesi Province, Cajacay District, and in the Ocros Province, Cajamarquilla District.
