= Mama Hirka =

Mountain in Peru

- Location within Peru

Highest point
- Elevation: 4,200 m (13,800 ft)
- Coordinates: 9°47′13″S 76°57′39″W

Geography
- Location: Peru, Ancash Region
- Parent range: Andes

Mama Hirka (Quechua mama vein, hirka mountain, "vein mountain", also spelled Mamajirca) is a mountain in the Andes of Peru which reaches a height of approximately 4,200 m (13,800 ft). It is located in the Ancash Region, Bolognesi Province, Huallanca District.
