= Canis (disambiguation) =

Canis is a genus which includes dogs, wolves and jackals.

Canis may also refer to:

== People with the surname ==
- Cornelius Canis (between 1500 and 1510–1561), Franco-Flemish composer of the Renaissance

== Astronomy ==
- Canis Major, the 'big dog' constellation
- Canis Minor, the 'small dog' constellation
- Canes Venatici, the hunting dogs
- Canis Major Dwarf Galaxy
- Tau Canis Majoris Cluster, an open cluster of stars

== Places ==
- Canis District in the Ancash Region, Peru

== Other ==
- Stercus canis officinale, the dung of dogs or hyenas that has become white through exposure to air used in dressing leather

== See also ==
- Including use as a species name
