= Kushuru (Bolognesi) =

Mountain in Peru

- Location within Peru

Highest point
- Elevation: 4,800 m (15,700 ft)
- Coordinates: 10°07′53″S 76°58′47″W

Geography
- Location: Peru, Ancash Region
- Parent range: Andes

Kushuru (Ancash Quechua for an edible kind of seaweed, erroneously also spelled Cshuro) is a mountain in the Andes of Peru which reaches an altitude of approximately 4,800 m (15,700 ft). It is located in the Ancash Region, Bolognesi Province, Huasta District. Kushuru lies south of the Pampa Wayi valley.
