= Jupa Tawqaña =

Mountain in Peru

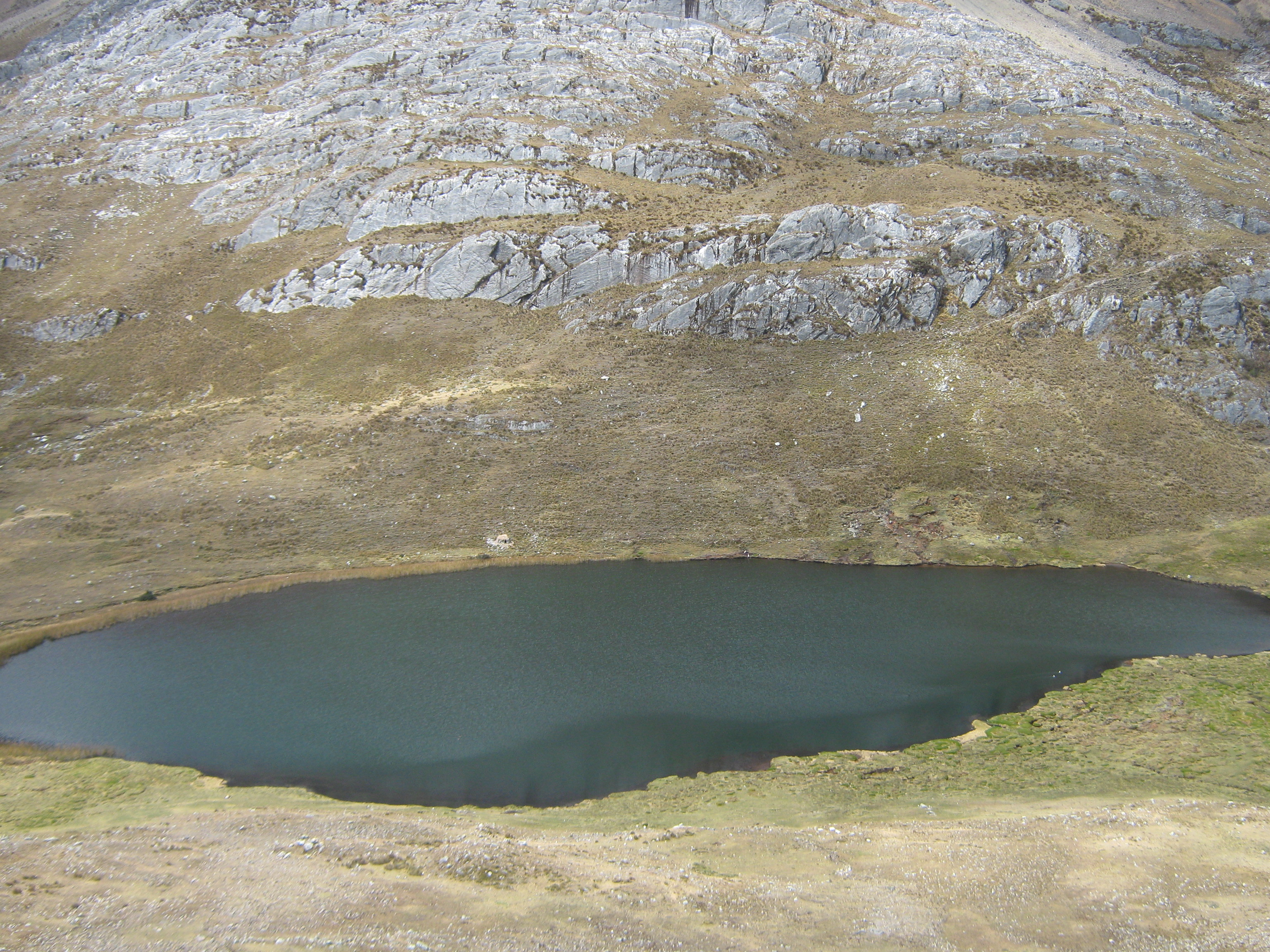
- Yanaqucha ("black lake") at the foot of Jupa Tawqaña

Highest point
- Elevation: 4,800 m (15,700 ft)
- Coordinates: 09°59′01″S 77°03′17″W

Geography
- Location within Peru
- Location: Peru, Ancash Region
- Parent range: Andes, Wallanka

Jupa Tawqaña (Aymara jupa quinoa, tawqaña to pile, "where quinoa is piled", Hispanicized spelling Jupaytaugana) or Jupa Tawqana (Quechua tawqa heap, pile, -na a suffix) is a mountain in the Wallanka mountain range in the Andes of Peru which reaches an altitude of approximately 4,800 m (15,700 ft). It is located in the Ancash Region, Bolognesi Province, Aquia District. Jupay Tawqaña lies at the Kinwa Raqra valley (Quechua kinwa quinoa, raqra crack, crevice, "quinoa crack", Hispanicized Quennua Ragra) northeast of Kinwa Quta ("quinoa lake", Hispanicized Genhuacuta).
