= Cajamarquilla District =

Coordinates: 9°37′59″S 77°45′00″W

Cajamarquilla
- District
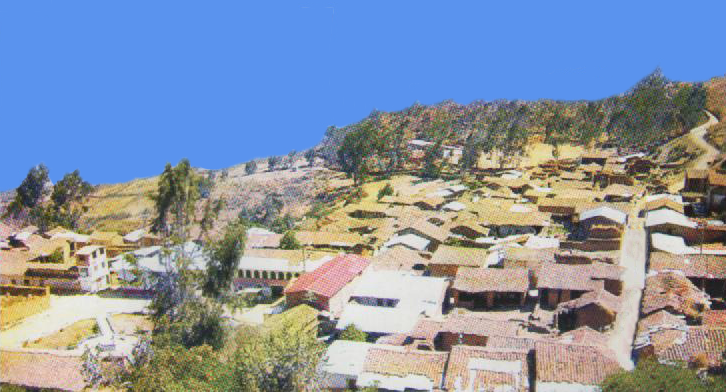
- Interactive map of Cajamarquilla
- Country: Peru
- Region: Ancash
- Province: Ocros
- Founded: October 23, 1907
- Capital: Cajamarquilla

Government
  - Mayor: Ediles Euler Huaman Pajuelo

Area
  - Total: 75.52 km^{2} (29.16 sq mi)
- Elevation: 3,514 m (11,529 ft)

Population (2005 census)
  - Total: 188
  - Density: 2.49/km^{2} (6.45/sq mi)
- Time zone: UTC-5 (PET)
- UBIGEO: 021403

Cajamarquilla District is one of ten districts of the Ocros Province in Peru.

== See also ==
- Kushuru Punta
- Shinwaqucha
- Yuraq Punta
