= Tuku Wachanan =

Mountain in Peru

- Location within Peru

Highest point
- Elevation: 4,600 m (15,100 ft)
- Coordinates: 10°14′52″S 77°18′47″W

Geography
- Location: Peru, Ancash Region
- Parent range: Andes

Tuku Wachanan (Quechua tuku owl, wacha birth, to give birth, -na, -n suffixes, "where the owl is born", also spelled Tucuhuachanan) is a mountain in the Andes of Peru which reaches a height of approximately 4,600 m (15,100 ft). It is located in the Ancash Region, Bolognesi Province, Cajacay District.
