= Kikash =

Mountain in Peru

- Pampash
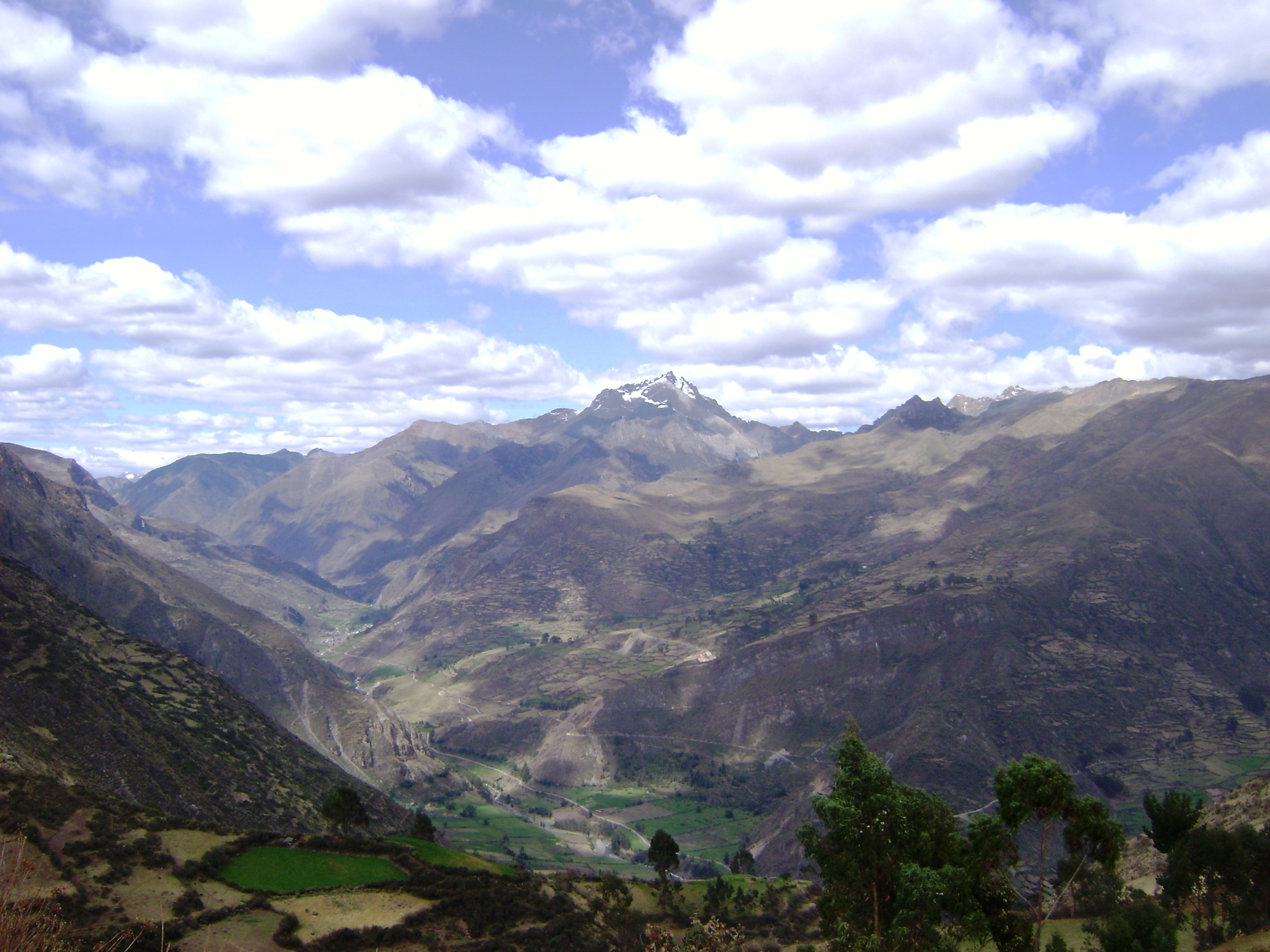
- Kikash as seen from the southwest (Chiquián District)

Highest point
- Elevation: 5,338 m (17,513 ft)
- Coordinates: 10°03′16″S 77°06′00″W

Geography
- Location within Peru
- Location: Peru, Ancash Region
- Parent range: Wallanka mountain range

Climbing
- First ascent: 1-1984

Kikash (Quechua, Hispanicized spelling Quicash) or Pampash (in the local Quechua variant, pampa means "large plain") is a mountain in the Wallanka mountain range in the Andes of Peru, about 5,338 m (17,513 ft)) high. It is located in the Ancash Region, Bolognesi Province, Aquia District. It is situated southwest of the main range in a small subrange called Waman Wiqi (Quechua waman falcon or variable hawk, wiqi tear, "falcon tear" or "hawk tear", Hispanicized Huaman Hueque, Huamán Hueque, Huamanhuequi). There is a small lake named Waman Wiqi southeast of Kikash. The stream Pampash originates on the west side of the mountain, flowing west to the Patiwillka River.

== Images ==
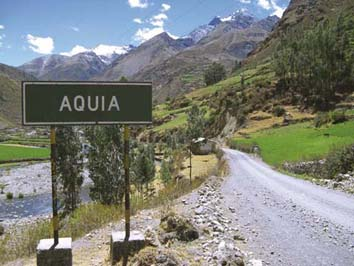
Kikash as seen from Aquia
