= Rupha Wayi =

Mountain in Peru

- Location within Peru

Highest point
- Elevation: 4,400 m (14,400 ft)
- Coordinates: 9°47′24″S 76°58′43″W

Geography
- Location: Peru, Ancash Region
- Parent range: Andes

Rupha Wayi (Quechua rupha burning, Ancash Quechua wayi house, "burning house", also spelled Rupahuay) is a mountain in the Andes of Peru which reaches a height of approximately 4,400 m (14,436 ft). It is located in the Ancash Region, Bolognesi Province, Huallanca District.
