= Puka Qaqa (Bolognesi) =

Mountain in Peru

- Location within Peru

Highest point
- Elevation: 4,800 m (15,700 ft)
- Coordinates: 10°06′32″S 77°00′58″W

Geography
- Location: Peru, Ancash Region
- Parent range: Andes

Puka Qaqa (Quechua puka red, qaqa rock, "red rock", Hispanicized spelling Pucaccacca) is a mountain south of the Wallanka mountain range in the Andes of Peru which reaches an altitude of approximately 4,800 m (15,700 ft). It is located in the Ancash Region, Bolognesi Province, Huasta District. Puka Qaqa lies at the Pampa Wayi valley, southwest of a lake named Kunturqucha ("condor lake").
