= Allgojirca =

Mountain in Peru

- Location within Peru

Highest point
- Elevation: 4,400 m (14,400 ft)
- Coordinates: 9°50′06″S 76°58′31″W

Geography
- Location: Peru, Ancash Region
- Parent range: Andes

Allgojirca or Allqu Hirka (Quechua allqu 'dog', hirka 'mountain') is a mountain in the Andes of Peru which reaches a height of approximately 4,400 m (14,400 ft). It is located in the Ancash Region, Bolognesi Province, Huallanca District.
