= Mangas District =

Coordinates: 10.37394°S 77.1011°W

Mangas
- District
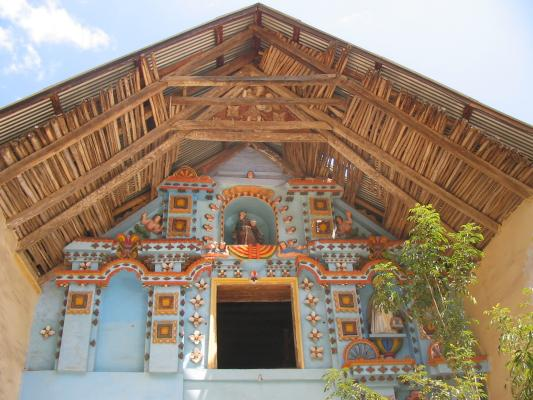
- Interactive map of Mangas
- Country: Peru
- Region: Ancash
- Province: Bolognesi
- Capital: Mangas

Government
  - Mayor: Mariano Rojas Garcia

Area
  - Total: 115.84 km^{2} (44.73 sq mi)
- Elevation: 3,459 m (11,348 ft)

Population (2005 census)
  - Total: 559
  - Density: 4.83/km^{2} (12.5/sq mi)
- Time zone: UTC-5 (PET)
- UBIGEO: 020512

Mangas District is one of fifteen districts of the province Bolognesi in Peru.

Manuel Burga has shown that in Mangas many of the social structures are pre-Hispanic and have only slowly been modified in the recent centuries. Much like imperial Cuzco, there are two districts Hana Barrio and Ura Barrio. The alcalde and regidor positions, positions of authority rotate from one side to the other each year. Many of the women in Mangas speak only Quechua while the men tend to be more bilingual Spanish-Quechua.

== Bibliography ==
- Burga, Manuel. Nacimiento de una utopía: Muerte y resurrección de los Incas. Segunda edición. Lima/Guadalajara: Universidad Nacional Mayor de San Marcos/Universidad de Guadalajara, [1988], 2005.
