= Yanashallash =

Mountain in Peru

- Location within Peru

Highest point
- Elevation: 4,600 m (15,100 ft)
- Coordinates: 9°51′00″S 77°05′17″W

Geography
- Location: Peru, Ancash Region
- Parent range: Wallanka

Yanashallash, Yanashalla, or Yanashayash (in the regional Quechua spellings, yana black, salla large cliff of gravel; bride, girlfriend, lover, aya corpse, "black cliff of gravel", "black bride" or "black corpse") is a mountain in the north of the Wallanka mountain range in the Andes of Peru, about 4,600 m (15,100 ft) high.

Yanashallash or Yanashayash is also the name of the mountain pass at 4,600 m (15,100 ft) at the mountain. It connects the towns of Chiquián and Huallanca. The mountain and the pass are located in the Ancash Region, Bolognesi Province, in the districts of Aquia and Huallanca.
