= Chawpi Hanka (Ancash-Huánuco) =

Mountain in Peru

- Location within Peru

Highest point
- Elevation: 4,800 m (15,700 ft)
- Coordinates: 10°07′09″S 76°54′58″W

Geography
- Location: Peru, Ancash, Huánuco Region
- Parent range: Andes

Chawpi Hanka (Quechua chawpi central, middle, hanka snowcapped ridge or peak; ice, "central ridge (or peak)", Hispanicized spelling Chaupijanca) is a mountain in the Andes of Peru, about 4,800 m (15,748 ft) high. It is situated in the Ancash Region, Bolognesi Province, in the districts of Huallanca and Huasta, and the Huánuco Region Lauricocha Province, Queropalca District. It lies on a ridge north of the Waywash mountain range.
