= Ticllos District =

Coordinates: 10.218°S 77.066°W

Ticllos
- District
- Interactive map of Ticllos
- Country: Peru
- Region: Ancash
- Province: Bolognesi
- Founded: January 2, 1857
- Capital: Ticllos

Government
  - Mayor: Jorge Carhuachin Serna

Area
  - Total: 89.41 km^{2} (34.52 sq mi)
- Elevation: 3,655 m (11,991 ft)

Population (2005 census)
  - Total: 810
  - Density: 9.1/km^{2} (23/sq mi)
- Time zone: UTC-5 (PET)
- UBIGEO: 020515

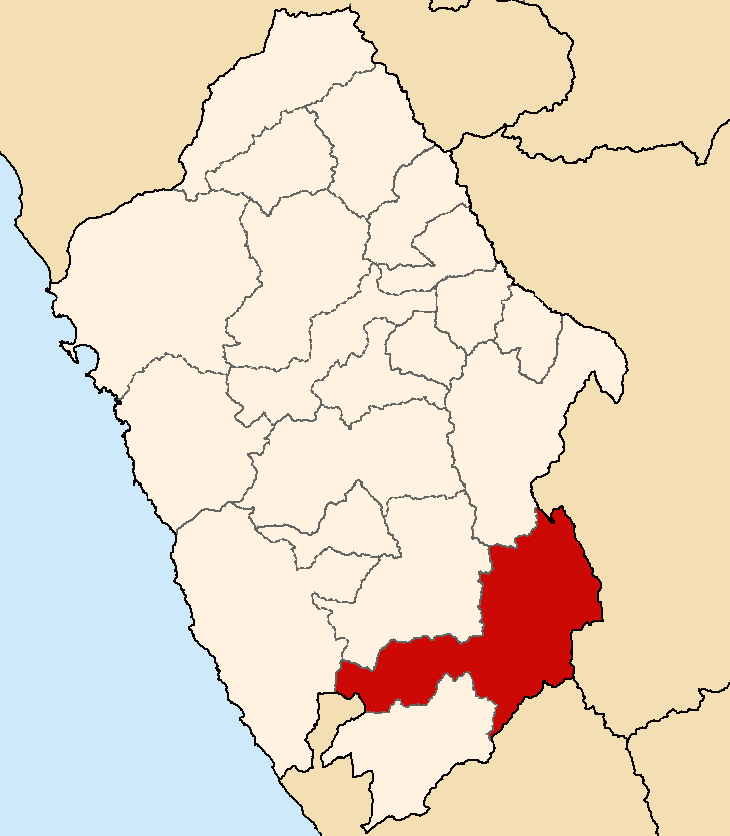
Location of the province Bolgnesi on the Ancash region in Peru

Ticllos District is one of fifteen districts of the province Bolognesi in Peru.
