= Shinuacocha =

Mountain in Peru

- Location within Peru

Highest point
- Elevation: 4,800 m (15,700 ft)
- Coordinates: 10°18′26″S 77°14′28″W

Geography
- Location: Peru, Ancash Region
- Parent range: Cordillera Negra

Shinuacocha (possibly from Ancash Quechua shinwa nettle, qucha lake, "nettle lake") is a mountain in the Cordillera Negra in the Andes of Peru, about 4,800 metres (15,748 ft) high. It is situated in the Ancash Region, Bolognesi Province, Corpanqui District, and in the Ocros Province, Cajamarquilla District.

The mountain was named after a little lake east of it in the Corpanqui District at 10°18′19″S 77°14′18″W.
