= Huallanca District, Bolognesi =

Huallanca Wallanka
- District
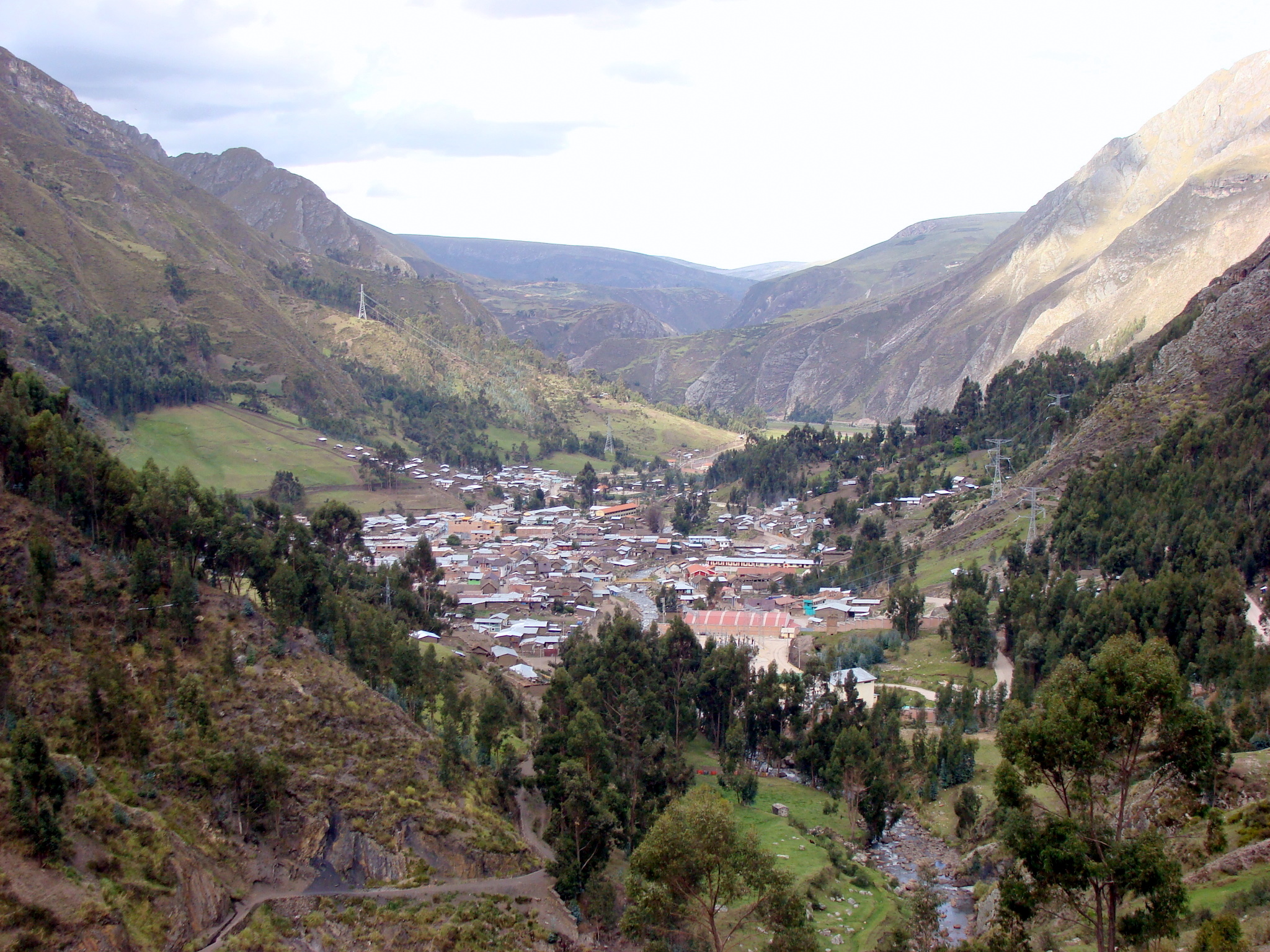
- Huallanca as seen from Huamantanga
- Interactive map of Huallanca
- Coordinates: 09°52′48″S 76°57′36″W
- Country: Peru
- Region: Ancash
- Province: Bolognesi
- Founded: January 2, 1857
- Capital: Huallanca

Government
  - Mayor: Wilmer Serafin Cornelio Rojas

Area
  - Total: 873.39 km^{2} (337.22 sq mi)
- Elevation: 3,540 m (11,610 ft)

Population (2005 census)
  - Total: 6,353
  - Density: 7.274/km^{2} (18.84/sq mi)
- Time zone: UTC-5 (PET)
- UBIGEO: 020508

Huallanca (hispanicized spelling) or Wallanka (Quechua for "mountain range" and the cactus species Austrocylindropuntia subulata) is a district of the Bolognesi Province in the Ancash Region of Peru.

== Geography ==
The Wallanka mountain range mountain range traverses the district. Some of the highest mountains of the district are listed below:

- Allqu Hirka
- Asul Kunkush
- Asul Qaqa
- Chawpi Hanka
- Chawpi Hanka (Anc.-Huán.)
- Ch'uspi
- Kunkush
- Kuntur Wayi
- Kushuru
- Mama Hirka
- Mashwa Raqra
- Millwa Qaqa
- Mina Punta
- Munti Hirka
- Muya Wayin
- Ñawin Punta
- Puka Kushuru
- Puka Yaku
- Pukarahu
- Puma Wayin
- Puma Wayin (near Kunturqucha)
- P'unchaw
- Qayqu
- Ritama
- Rupha Wayi
- Tankan
- Tankanqucha
- Tarush Kancha
- Tawqan
- Tiklla
- T'uru Hirka
- Waka Rumi
- Wallanka
- Wathiya Wathiya
- Waychaw Punta
- Wayllas
- Yana Hirka
- Yana Hirka (Huallanca)
- Yana Pukyu
- Yana Wank'a
- Yanashallash
- Yantaq

== See also ==
- Ninaqucha
- Pampaqucha
- Suyruqucha
