= Huayllacayán District =

Coordinates: 10.244694°S 77.4344°W

Huayllacayán
- District
- Interactive map of Huayllacayán
- Country: Peru
- Region: Ancash
- Province: Bolognesi
- Founded: January 2, 1857
- Capital: Huayllacayán

Government
  - Mayor: Marcial Dedicacion Ramos Luna

Area
  - Total: 127.99 km^{2} (49.42 sq mi)
- Elevation: 3,256 m (10,682 ft)

Population (2005 census)
  - Total: 1,357
  - Density: 10.60/km^{2} (27.46/sq mi)
- Time zone: UTC-5 (PET)
- UBIGEO: 020510

Huayllacayán District is one of fifteen districts of the province Bolognesi in Peru.
