= Yanajirca (Ancash) =

Mountain in Peru

- Location within Peru

Highest point
- Elevation: 4,800 m (15,700 ft)
- Coordinates: 10°06′09″S 76°57′04″W

Geography
- Location: Peru, Ancash Region
- Parent range: Andes

Yanajirca or Yana Hirka (Quechua yana black, Ancash Quechua hirka mountain, "black mountain", also spelled Yanajirca) is a mountain in the Andes of Peru which reaches an altitude of approximately 4,800 m (15,700 ft). It is located in the Ancash Region, Bolognesi Province, on the border of the districts of Huallanca and Huasta. Yana Hirka lies east of Wamash Mach'ay.
