= Chuspi (Ancash) =

Mountain in Peru

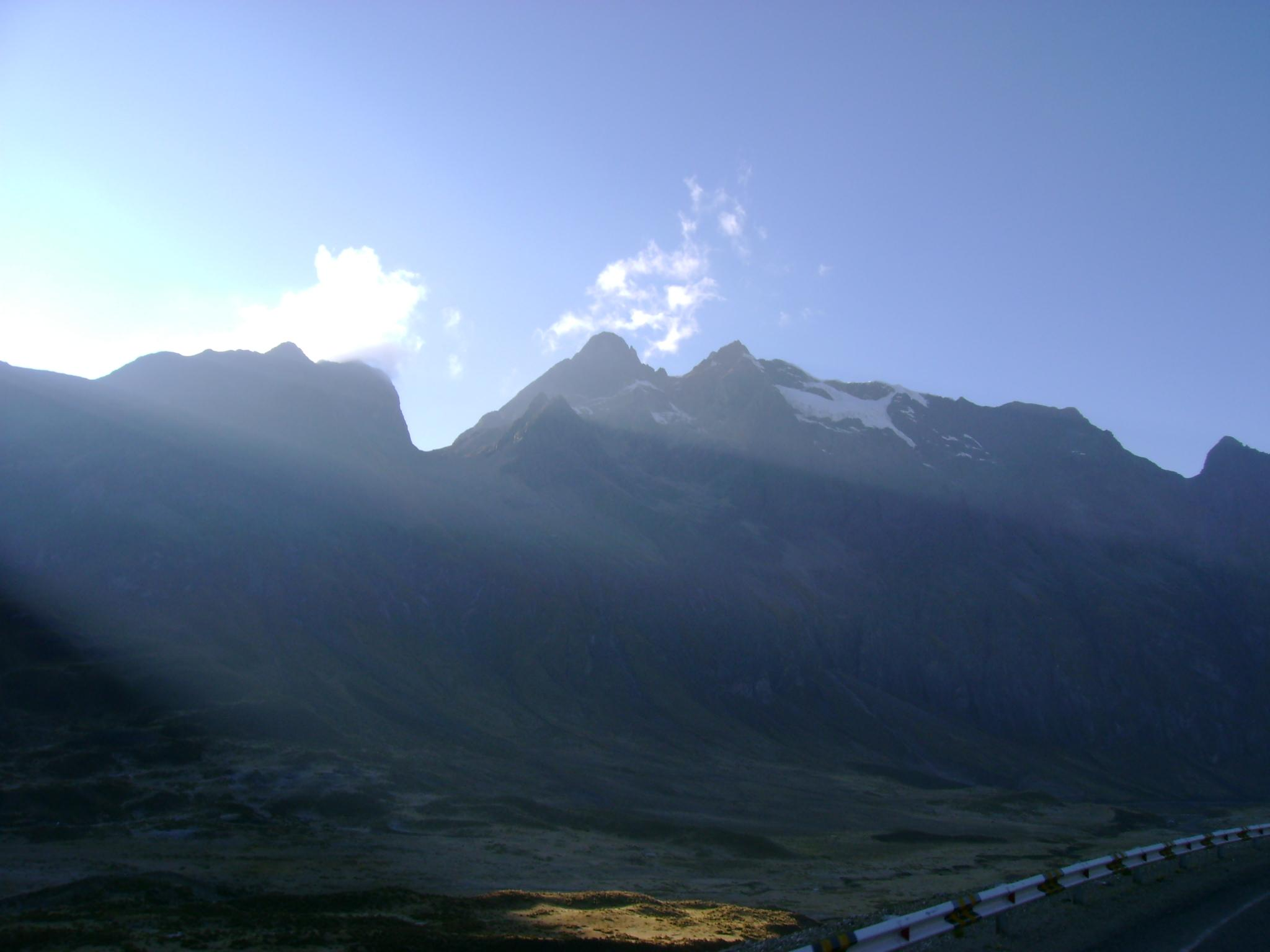
- Chuspi as seen from the northwest

Highest point
- Elevation: 5,090 m (16,700 ft)
- Coordinates: 9°53′46″S 77°03′16″W

Geography
- Location within Peru
- Location: Peru, Ancash Region
- Parent range: Andes, Huallanca

Chuspi or Chuspic (possibly from Quechua for insect, generic name of flies or two-winged insects; fly,) is a 5,090-metre-high (16,700 ft) mountain in the north of the Huallanca mountain range in the Andes of Peru. It is located in the Ancash Region, Bolognesi Province, in the districts of Aquia and Huallanca.
