= Canis District =

Coordinates: 10°09′00″S 77°10′59″W

Canis
- District
- Interactive map of Canis
- Country: Peru
- Region: Ancash
- Province: Bolognesi
- Founded: January 29, 1965
- Capital: Canis

Government
  - Mayor: Hugo Leonid Aldave Huaman

Area
  - Total: 19.45 km^{2} (7.51 sq mi)
- Elevation: 2,460 m (8,070 ft)

Population (2005 census)
  - Total: 256
  - Density: 13.2/km^{2} (34.1/sq mi)
- Time zone: UTC-5 (PET)
- UBIGEO: 020506

Canis District is one of fifteen districts of the province Bolognesi in Peru.
