= Suerococha (Huallanca) =

Lake in Peru

- Location within Peru
- Location: Peru; Ancash Region
- Coordinates: 10°02′4.6″S 76°58′15.5″W
- Surface area: 0.035992 km^{2} (35,992 m^{2})
- Surface elevation: 4,450 m (14,600 ft)

Suerococha (possibly from Quechua suyru a very long dress tracked after when worn, qucha lake,) is a lake in the south of the Huallanca mountain range in the Andes of Peru. It is situated at a height of 4,450 m (14,600 ft) comprising an area of 0.035992 km^{2} (35,992 m^{2}). Suerococha is located in the Ancash Region, Bolognesi Province, Huallanca District.
