= Tankan (Peru) =

Mountain in Peru

- Ruq'a Qaqa
- Location within Peru

Highest point
- Elevation: 5,162 m (16,936 ft)
- Coordinates: 9°52′19″S 77°03′43″W

Geography
- Location: Peru, Ancash Region
- Parent range: Wallanka

Tankan (Quechua tanka a deep bifurcation, fork, -n a suffix, Hispanicized spelling Tancan) or Ruq'a Qaqa (Quechua ruq'a Opuntia floccosa), qaqa rock, Hispanicized Rucagaga) is a 5,162-metre-high (16,936 ft) mountain in the northern part of the Wallanka mountain range in the Andes of Peru. It is located in the Ancash Region, Bolognesi Province, in the districts of Aquia and Huallanca.
