= Chiquián District =

Coordinates: 10°09′00″S 77°10′59″W

Chiquián Chiqllan
- District
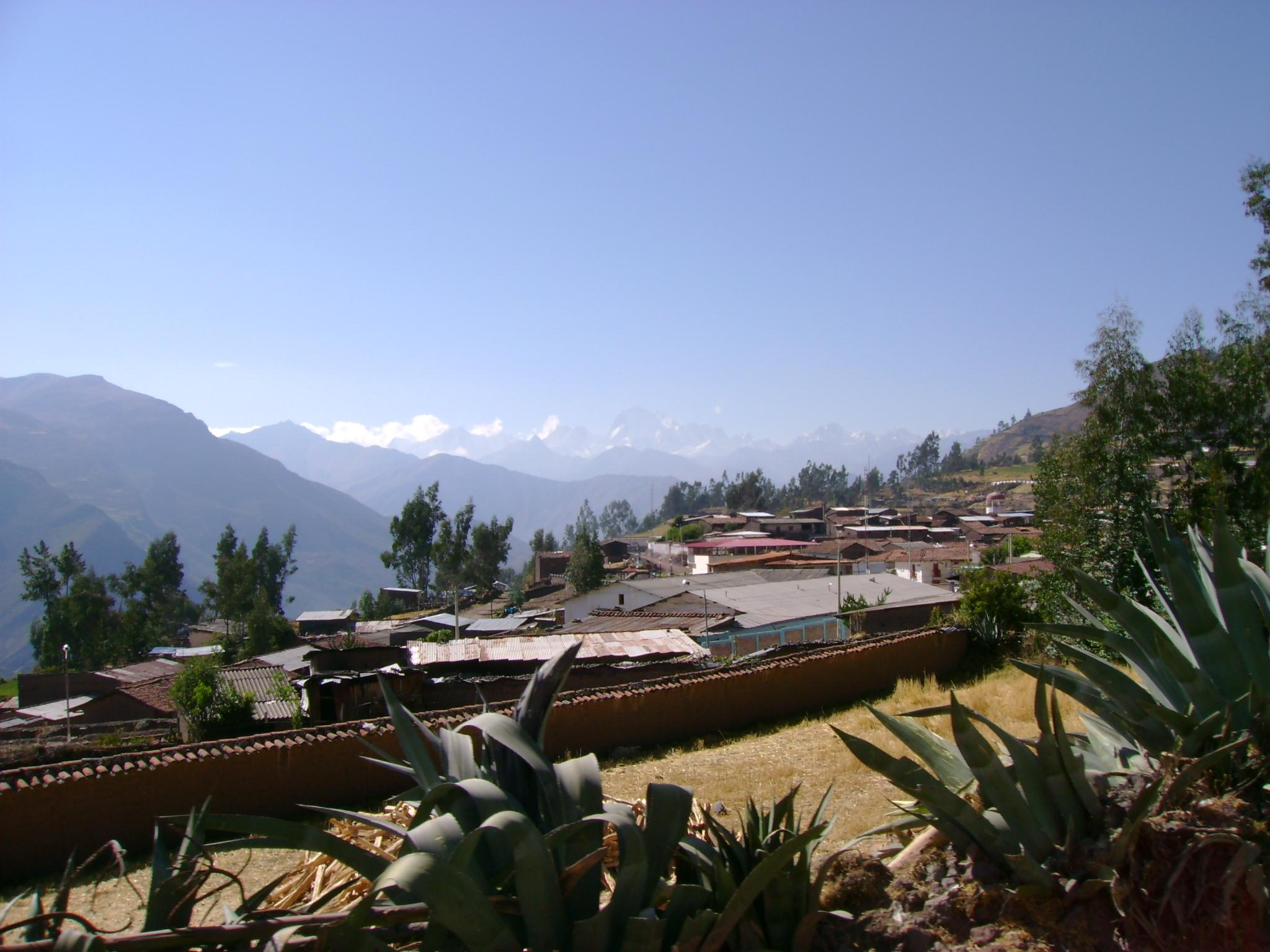
- Interactive map of Chiquián
- Country: Peru
- Region: Ancash
- Province: Bolognesi
- Capital: Chiquián

Government
  - Mayor: Gudberto Carrera Padilla

Area
  - Total: 184.16 km^{2} (71.10 sq mi)
- Elevation: 4,023 m (13,199 ft)

Population (2017)
  - Total: 4,508
  - Density: 24.48/km^{2} (63.40/sq mi)
- Time zone: UTC-5 (PET)
- UBIGEO: 020501

Chiquián is a district of the province of Bolognesi, in the Ancash Region of Peru.

It is located on the Nor-Eastern part of the Bolognesi Province, Ancash Department in Peru. Its altitude is 3,350 meters above sea level, has approximately 6,500 people and an area of 184,165 km^{2}. Its topography seems jagged because of the Cordillera Blanca of Tucuchira, which is characterized for its everlasting snow mountains Cara Cara and Huara Pasca that are located in the north part of the district. The Nudo de Chonta is located in the western part with its noticeable chains of mountains comparable to the Cordillera Negra, with its evident absence of snow. The climate is dry and fluctuates from cold to tempered.

== Climate ==
Climate data for Chiquián, elevation 3,414 m (11,201 ft), (1991–2020)
Month	Jan	Feb	Mar	Apr	May	Jun	Jul	Aug	Sep	Oct	Nov	Dec	Year
Mean daily maximum °C (°F)	21.2 (70.2)	20.8 (69.4)	20.8 (69.4)	21.0 (69.8)	21.0 (69.8)	20.6 (69.1)	20.8 (69.4)	21.3 (70.3)	21.7 (71.1)	21.4 (70.5)	21.4 (70.5)	21.2 (70.2)	21.1 (70.0)
Mean daily minimum °C (°F)	4.3 (39.7)	4.5 (40.1)	4.5 (40.1)	4.5 (40.1)	3.9 (39.0)	3.3 (37.9)	3.1 (37.6)	3.5 (38.3)	4.0 (39.2)	4.1 (39.4)	4.1 (39.4)	4.3 (39.7)	4.0 (39.2)
Average precipitation mm (inches)	106.1 (4.18)	127.8 (5.03)	145.9 (5.74)	66.0 (2.60)	13.7 (0.54)	0.9 (0.04)	0.2 (0.01)	1.9 (0.07)	11.8 (0.46)	34.2 (1.35)	42.5 (1.67)	92.6 (3.65)	643.6 (25.34)
Source: National Meteorology and Hydrology Service of Peru

== Events ==
Fiesta de Santa Rosa de Lima, Patrona de Chiquián is an annual celebration held in August in commemoration of Saint Rosa of Lima, Patron of Chiquián.

== See also ==
- Rumi Wayin Punta
