= Puka Hirka (Bolognesi) =

Mountain in Peru

- Location within Peru

Highest point
- Elevation: 4,800 m (15,700 ft)
- Coordinates: 9°53′30″S 77°09′46″W

Geography
- Location: Peru, Ancash Region
- Parent range: Andes, Cordillera Blanca

Puka Hirka (Quechua puka red, hirka mountain, "red mountain", Hispanicized spelling Puca Jirca) is a mountain in the Cordillera Blanca in the Andes of Peru, about 4,800 m (15,700 ft) high. It is situated in the Ancash Region, Bolognesi Province, Aquia District, northeast of Pastururi.
