= Album graecum =

Album græcum, or stercus canis officinale, is the dung of dogs or hyenas that has become white through exposure to air. It is used in dressing leather.

White dog dung (often mixed with honey) was formerly used as a medicinal drug to treat inflammations of the throat, or as plaster, spread on skin to close and heal wounds.

"Dogs white Dung, or Album Graecum, as it is commonly call'd. This is said to cleanse and deterge; but is used in little else than in Inflammations of the Throat, with Honey; and that outwardly as a Plaster more than any other way: but is seldom appears to any great purpose."

At the time of its use, it was thought by some to be a form of witchcraft.

"I inquired next how she became dumb. She told me, by reason of a sore swelling she took in her throat and tongue; but afterwards by the application of Album Graecum, "which I thought," said she, “was revealed to me, I recovered my speech.” I asked her, how she came to the knowledge of witches and their practices."
