= Puma Wayin (Huallanca) =

Mountain in Peru

- Location within Peru

Highest point
- Elevation: 4,400 m (14,400 ft)
- Coordinates: 10°00′06″S 76°51′42″W

Geography
- Location: Peru, Ancash Region
- Parent range: Andes

Puma Wayin (Quechua puma cougar, puma, Ancash Quechua wayi house, "cougar house", -n a suffix, also spelled Pumahuain, Pumahuin) is a mountain in the Andes of Peru which reaches a height of approximately 4,400 m (14,436 ft). It is located in the Ancash Region, Bolognesi Province, Huallanca District, east of Ismu Cruz.
