= Bolognesi province =

Coordinates: 10°09′00″S 77°10′59″W

Bolognesi
- Province
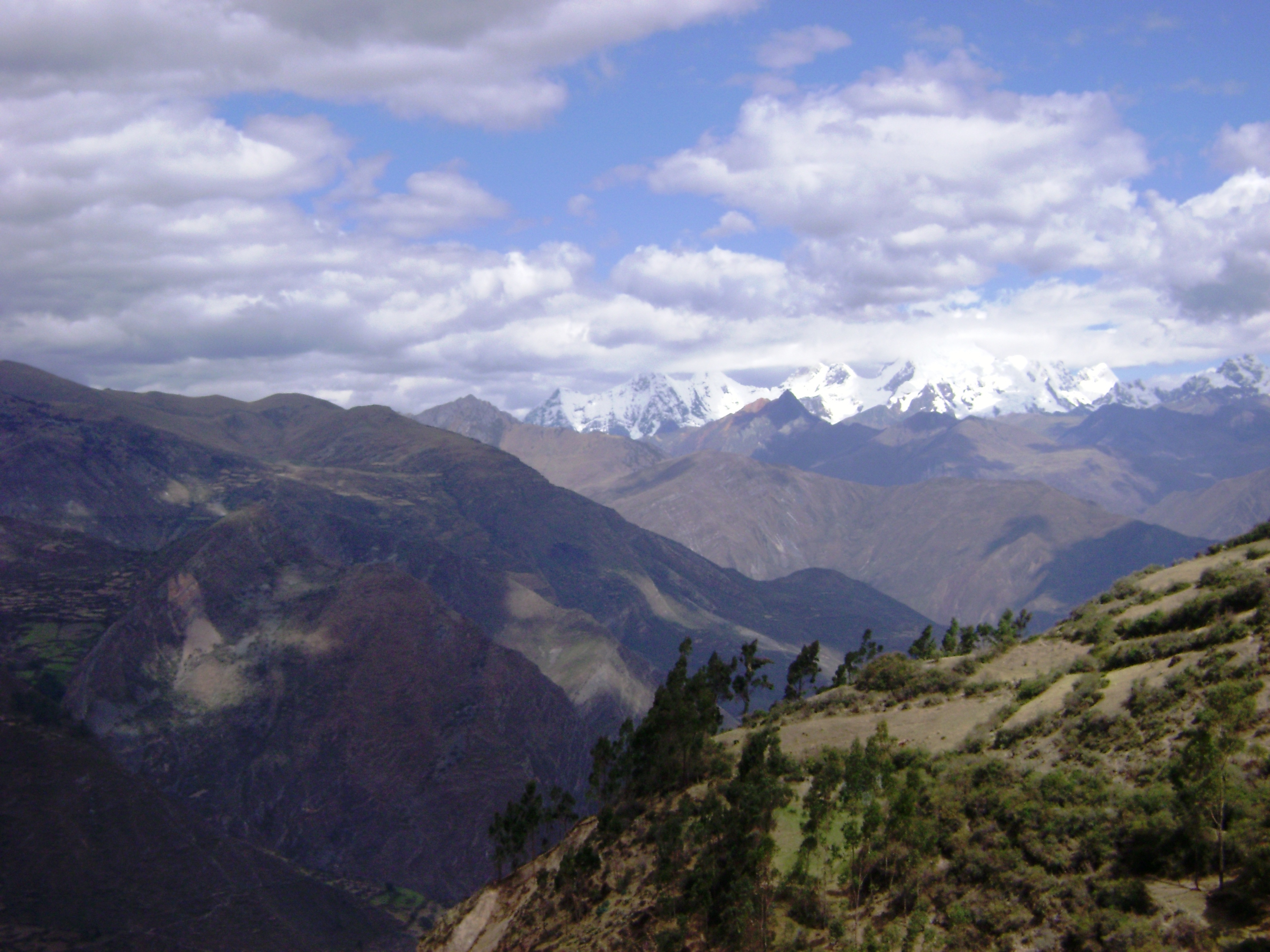
- Waywash mountain range as seen from Chiquián

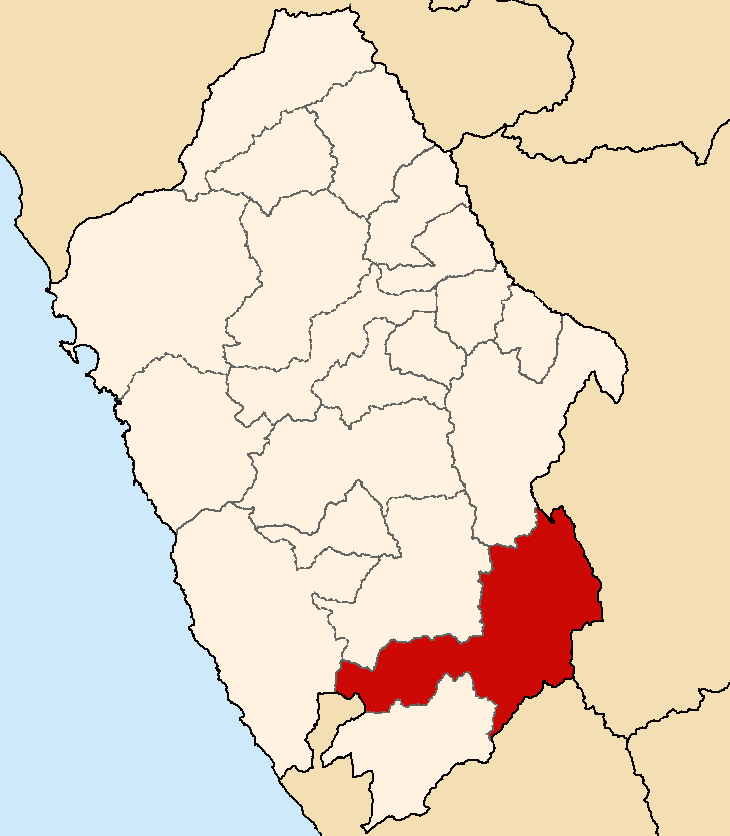
- Location of Bolognesi in the Ancash Region
- Country: Peru
- Region: Ancash
- Capital: Chiquián

Government
  - Mayor: Gudberto Carrera Padilla

Area
  - Total: 3,155 km^{2} (1,218 sq mi)

Population
  - Total: 23,797
  - Density: 7.543/km^{2} (19.54/sq mi)
- Website: www.munibolognesi.gob.pe

Bolognesi is one of 20 provinces of the Ancash Region of Peru.

== Overview ==
The province originally was part of the province of Cajatambo (part of Lima Region since 1916) until 1903, when it was split off and named after Col. Francisco Bolognesi, the hero of the Battle of Arica. In 1990, the province of Ocros split off from Bolognesi.

== Geography ==
The area of the province comprises parts of four Andean mountain ranges with snow-covered mountains: the Cordillera Blanca, the Cordillera Negra, the Wallanka mountain range and the Waywash mountain range. Some of the highest peaks of the province are listed below:

- Allqu Hirka
- Aqus
- Asul Kunkush
- Asulqucha
- Awkillu
- Chakra Chakra
- Challwa
- Chawpi Hanka
- Chawpi Hanka (Anc.-Huán.)
- Chawpi Punta
- Chunta
- Chhankayuq
- Ch'uspi
- Inka Waqanqa
- Jupa Tawqaña
- Kallapu
- Kasha
- Kikash
- Kunkush
- Kuntur Wayi
- Kushuru
- Kushuru Punta
- Mama Hirka
- Mashwa Raqra
- Millwa Qaqa
- Minapata
- Mina Punta
- Mit'urahu
- Mulli Mach'ay
- Munti Hirka
- Munti Wayi
- Muntiyuq
- Muya Wayin
- Ñawin Punta
- Parya
- Pataqucha
- Pisqan Punta
- Puka Hirka
- Puka Kushuru
- Puka Qaqa
- Puka Yaku
- Pukarahu
- Puma Wayin
- Puma Wayin (near Kunturqucha)
- P'unchaw
- Qawi
- Qayqu
- Quntayqucha Punta
- Q'iruqucha
- Rahu Kutaq
- Rahu Qulluta
- Ritama
- Rumi Wayin Punta
- Rupha Wayi
- Shinwaqucha
- Shumaq
- Suyruqucha
- Tankan
- Tankanqucha
- Tarush Kancha
- Tawqan
- Tuku Wachanan
- Tuna Wayin
- Tunash Punta
- Tuku
- T'uru Hirka
- Waka Rumi
- Wakrish
- Wallanka
- Wamash Mach'ay
- Wari Hirka
- Wathiya Wathiya
- Wayi Sinqa
- Wayllas
- Yana Hirka
- Yana Hirka (Huallanca)
- Yana Jaqhi
- Yana Puyku
- Yana Wank'a
- Yanarahu
- Yanashallash
- Yuraq Punta
- Yuraq Kallapu

== Political division ==
Bolognesi is divided into fifteen districts, which are:

- Abelardo Pardo Lezameta
- Antonio Raymondi
- Aquia
- Cajacay
- Canis
- Chiquián
- Colquioc
- Huallanca
- Huasta
- Huayllacayán
- La Primavera
- Mangas
- Pacllón
- San Miguel de Corpanqui
- Ticllos

== Ethnic groups ==
The province is inhabited by indigenous citizens of Quechua descent. Spanish is the language which the majority of the population (84.05%) learnt to speak in childhood, 15.43% of the residents started speaking using the Quechua language (2007 Peru Census).

== See also ==
- Intipa Ñawin
- Ninaqucha
- Pampaqucha
- Suyruqucha
- Yanaqucha
