= Raju Cutac =

Mountain in Peru

Raju ancha
- Rajutuna
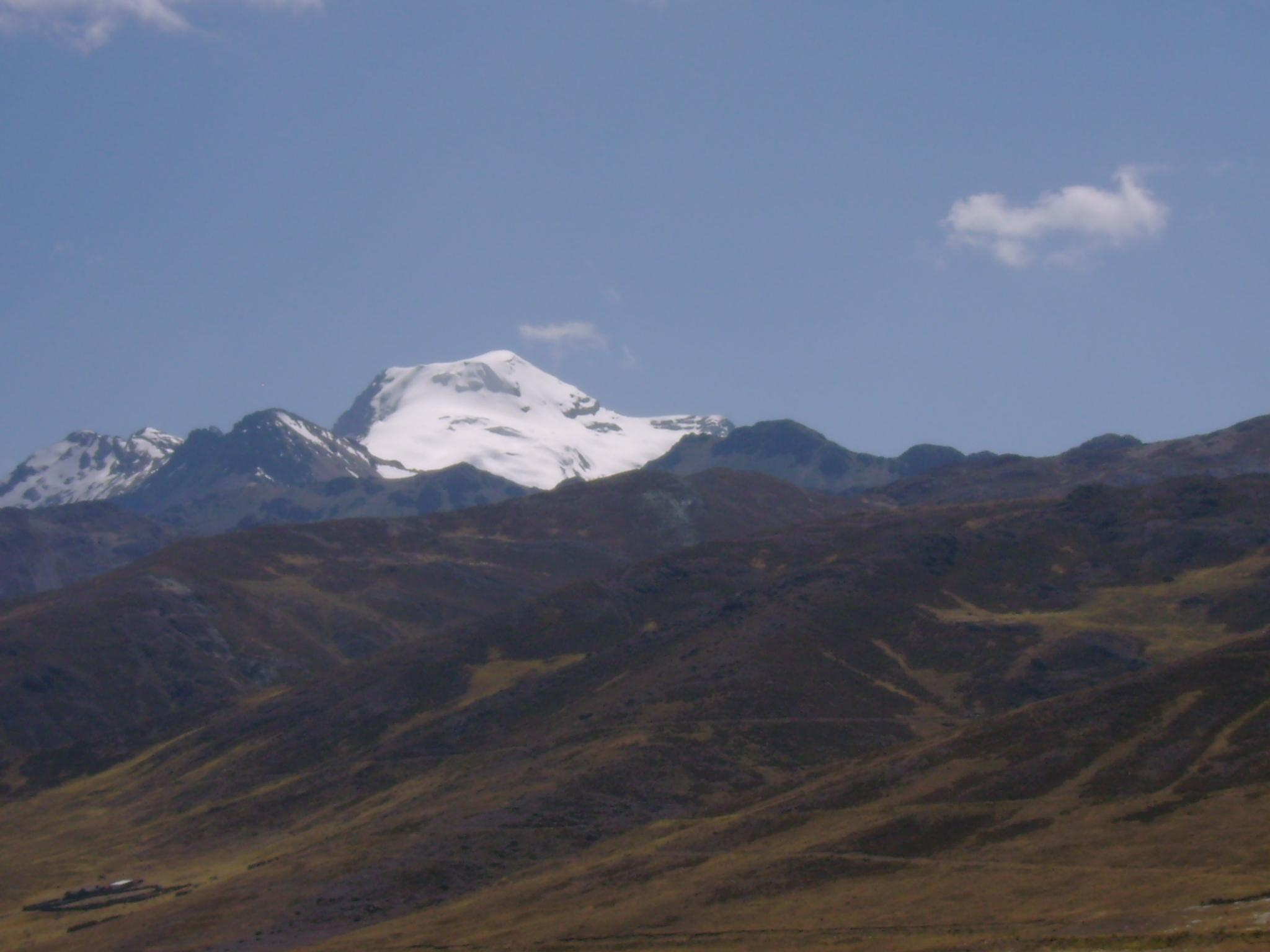
- Raju ancha as seen from Lake Conococha

Highest point
- Elevation: 5,355 m (17,569 ft)
- Coordinates: 10°00′34″S 77°10′36″W

Geography
- Location within Peru
- Location: Peru, Ancash Region
- Parent range: Andes, Cordillera Blanca

Climbing
- First ascent: 1962

Raju Cutac (possibly from Quechua rahu snow, ice, mountain with snow, Ancash Quechua kuta flour; corner, -q a suffix), Rajo Cutac or Rajutuna (possibly from Quechua tuna slope, "snow peak slope"), is a 5,355-metre-high (17,569 ft) mountain in the Cordillera Blanca in the Andes of Peru. It is situated in the Ancash Region, Bolognesi Province, Aquia District. Raju Cutac lies southeast of Challhua and Tuco.
