= Tancancocha =

Mountain in Peru

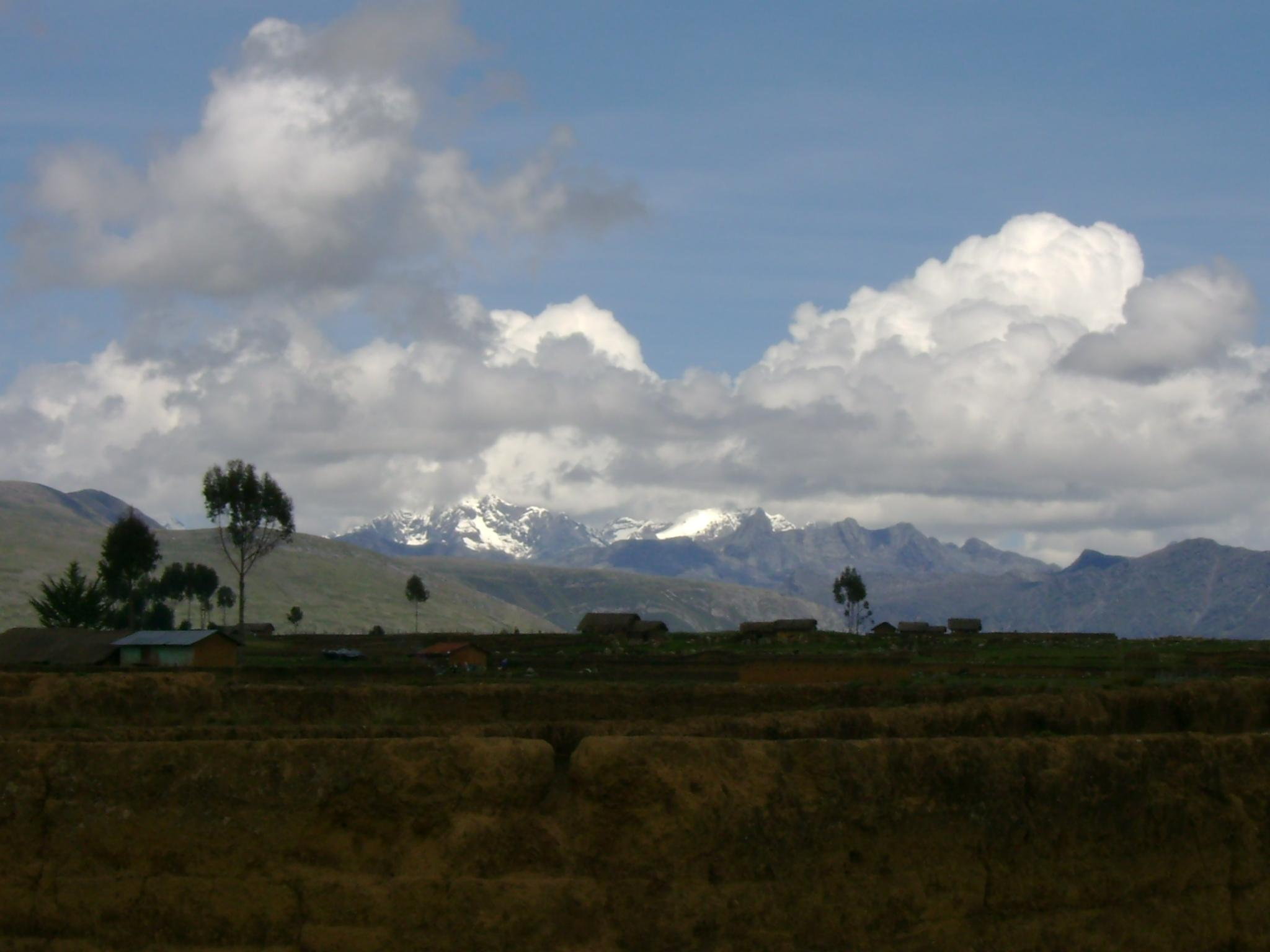
- Huallanca mountain range and Tancancocha as seen from the archaeological site of Huánuco Pampa

Highest point
- Elevation: 5,200 m (17,100 ft)
- Coordinates: 9°54′31″S 77°03′12″W

Geography
- Location within Peru
- Location: Peru, Ancash Region
- Parent range: Andes, Huallanca

Tancancocha (possibly from Quechua tanka fork, a deep bifurcation, -n a suffix, qucha lake, "lake of the bifurcation") is a mountain in the north of the Huallanca mountain range in the Andes of Peru at a small lake of that name. The mountain reaches an altitude of approximately 5,200 m (17,100 ft). It is located in the Ancash Region, Bolognesi Province, in the districts of Aquia and Huallanca.

The lake named Tancancocha lies in the Huallanca District at 9°53′55″S 77°02′56″W, northeast of the peak.
