= Chiquián =

Coordinates: 10.151°S 77.156°W

Chiquián Chiqllan
- Town
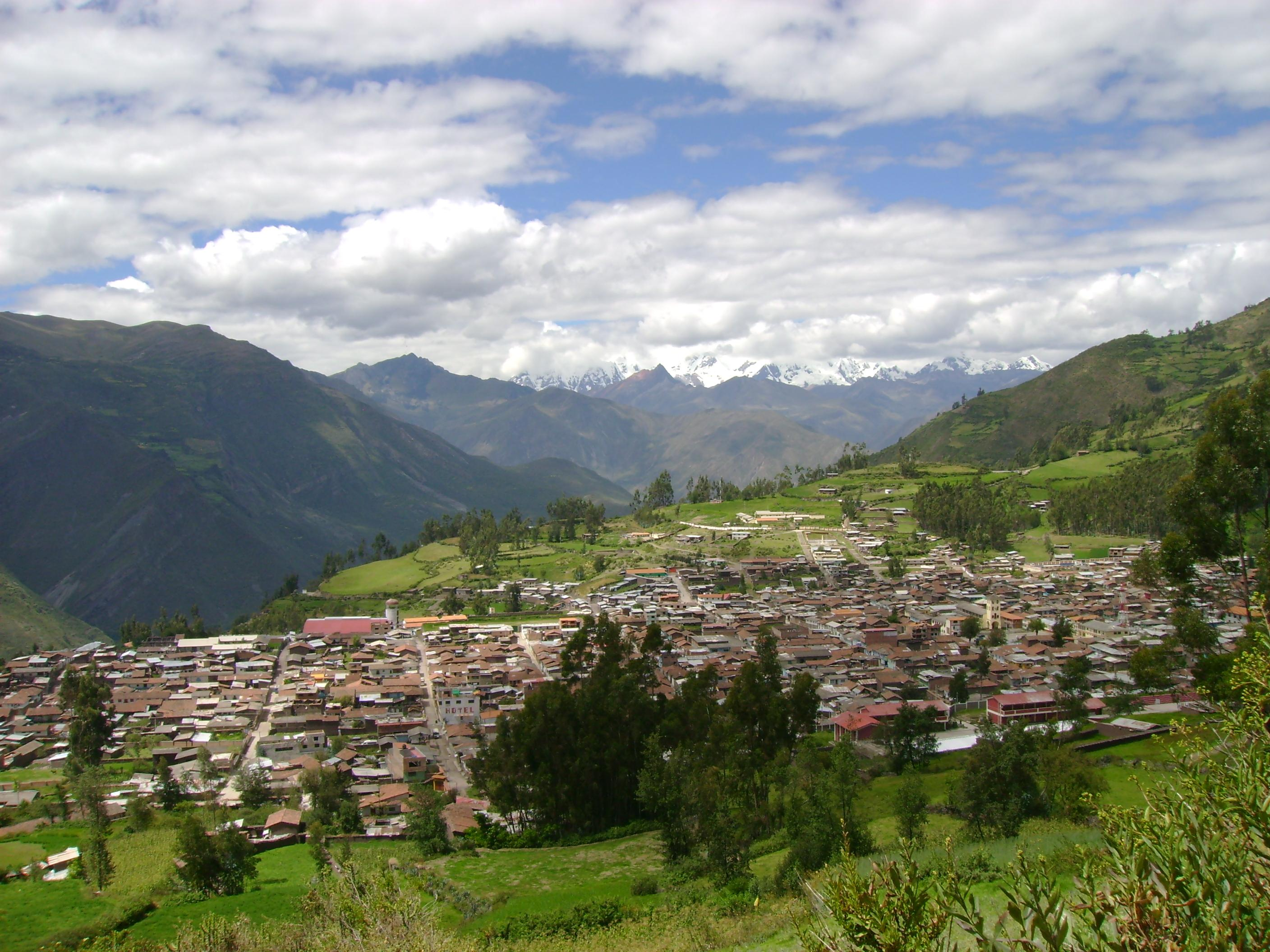
- The town Chiquián with the Huayhuash mountain range in the background
- Interactive map of Chiquián
- Country: Peru
- Region: Ancash
- Province: Bolognesi
- District: Chiquián

Government
  - Mayor: Gudberto Carrera Padilla

Population (2019)
  - Total: 3,641

Chiquián (Quechua Chiqllan) is a town in central Peru. It is the capital of the Bolognesi Province in the Ancash Region. Its nickname is "the mirror of the sky" [el espejito del cielo in Spanish].

== Climate ==
Climate data for Chiquián, elevation 3,414 m (11,201 ft), (1991–2020)
Month	Jan	Feb	Mar	Apr	May	Jun	Jul	Aug	Sep	Oct	Nov	Dec	Year
Mean daily maximum °C (°F)	21.2 (70.2)	20.8 (69.4)	20.8 (69.4)	21.0 (69.8)	21.0 (69.8)	20.6 (69.1)	20.8 (69.4)	21.3 (70.3)	21.7 (71.1)	21.4 (70.5)	21.4 (70.5)	21.2 (70.2)	21.1 (70.0)
Mean daily minimum °C (°F)	4.3 (39.7)	4.5 (40.1)	4.5 (40.1)	4.5 (40.1)	3.9 (39.0)	3.3 (37.9)	3.1 (37.6)	3.5 (38.3)	4.0 (39.2)	4.1 (39.4)	4.1 (39.4)	4.3 (39.7)	4.0 (39.2)
Average precipitation mm (inches)	106.1 (4.18)	127.8 (5.03)	145.9 (5.74)	66.0 (2.60)	13.7 (0.54)	0.9 (0.04)	0.2 (0.01)	1.9 (0.07)	11.8 (0.46)	34.2 (1.35)	42.5 (1.67)	92.6 (3.65)	643.6 (25.34)
Source: National Meteorology and Hydrology Service of Peru
