= Chaupijanca =

Mountain in Peru

- Location within Peru

Highest point
- Elevation: 5,283 m (17,333 ft)
- Coordinates: 10°01′00″S 77°00′09″W

Geography
- Location: Peru, Ancash Region
- Parent range: Andes, Huallanca

Chaupijanca or Chaupi Janca (possibly from Quechua chawpi central, middle, hanka snowcapped ridge or peak; ice, "central ridge (or peak)") is a 5,283-metre-high (17,333 ft) mountain in the Huallanca (or Chaupijanca) mountain range in the Andes of Peru. It is located in the Ancash Region, Bolognesi Province, in the districts of Huallanca and Huasta.
