= Huallanca mountain range =

Mountains in Peru

- Chaupi Janca / Shicra Shicra
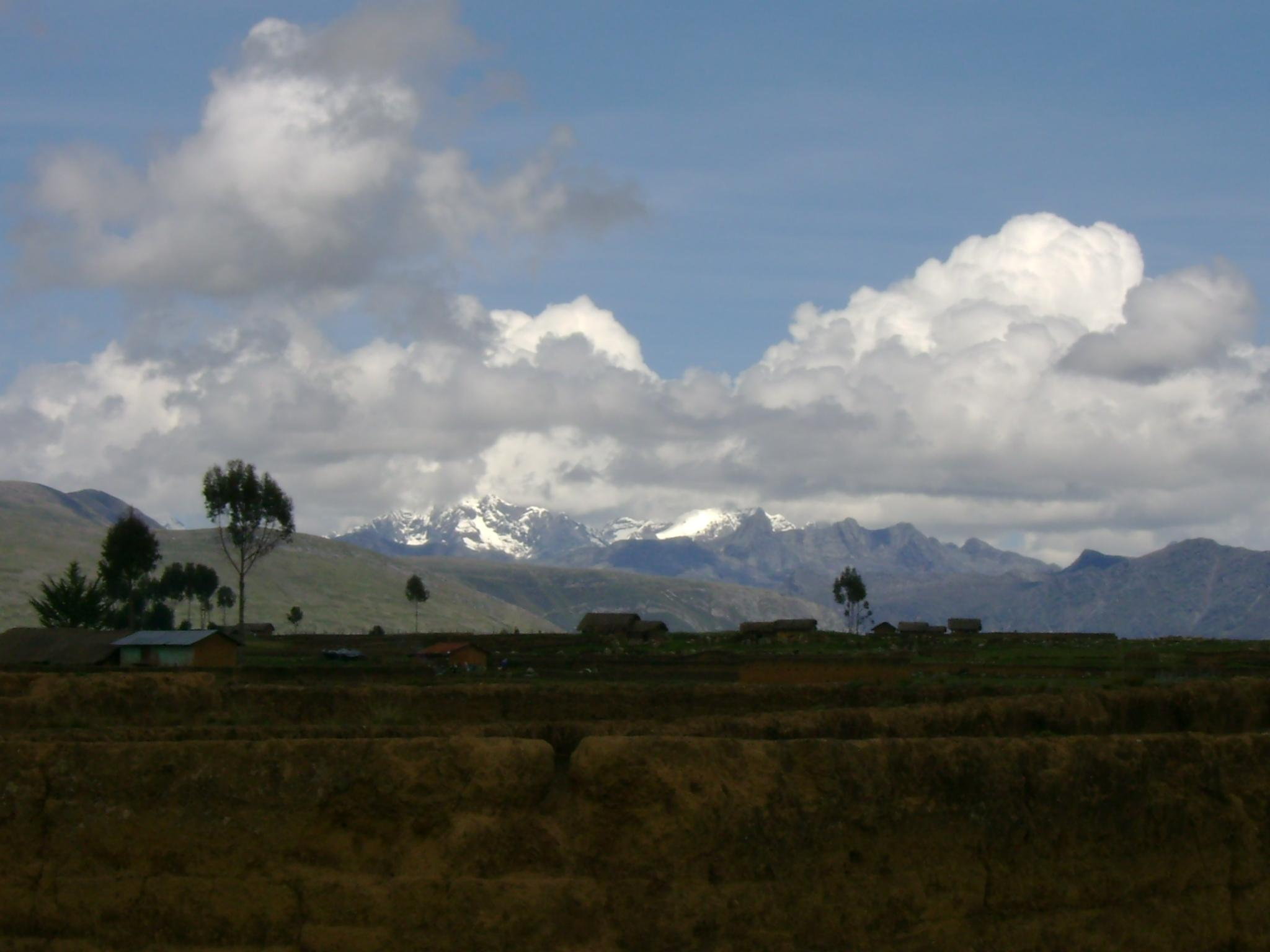
- The northern part of the Huallanca mountain range as seen from Huánuco Pampa

Highest point
- Peak: Huallanca
- Elevation: 5,470 m (17,950 ft)
- Coordinates: 10°00′44″S 77°00′22″W

Dimensions
- Length: 19 km (12 mi) N-S

Geography
- Country: Peru
- Region: Ancash Region
- Parent range: Andes

The Huallanca mountain range (possibly from Quechua, wallanka mountain range; a cactus plant (Opuntia subulata); also called Chaupi Janca or Shicra Shicra (possibly from Quechua sikra woven basket) lies in the Andes of Peru. It is located in the Ancash Region, Bolognesi Province. The Huallanca mountain range is a small range southeast of the Cordillera Blanca and north of the Huayhuash mountain range extending between 9°52' and 10°03'S and 76°58' and 77°04'W for about 19 km in a northeasterly direction.

East of the town of Aquia there is a small range called Huaman Hueque (possibly from Quechua waman falcon or variable hawk, wiqi tear). It is sometimes considered a sub-range of the Huallanca range. The Huaman Hueque range is dominated by Kikash.

== Mountains ==
The highest peak in the range is Huallanca at 5,470 metres (17,946 ft). The main peaks are listed below:

- Chaupijanca, 5,283 m (17,333 ft)
- Chuspi, 5,090 m (16,700 ft)
- Kikash, 5,338 m (17,513 ft)
- Kuntur Wayi, 5,171 m (16,965 ft)
- Minapata, 5,065 m (16,617 ft)
- Qawi, 5,000 m (16,000 ft)
- Tankan, 5,162 m (16,936 ft)
- Tancancocha, 5,200 m (17,100 ft)
- Tawqan, 5,200 m (17,100 ft)

== Lakes ==
There are numerous mostly small lakes along the range. Some of them on the western side are Tankanqucha, Yanaqucha, Kallapuyuq and Quntayqucha (from north to south). East the range there are Quntayqucha, Suyruqucha, Tankanqucha, Awasqucha, Tawqanqucha, Asulqucha, Pampaqucha and Susuqucha.
