= Aymaran languages =

Language family of the central Andes of South America

Aymaran
- Jaqi, Aru
- Geographic distribution: Central South America, Andes Mountains
- Linguistic classification: One of the world's primary language families (Quechumaran?): Aymaran
- Subdivisions: Aymara; Jaqaru–Kawki

Language codes
- Glottolog: ayma1253
- Linguasphere: 84-JA
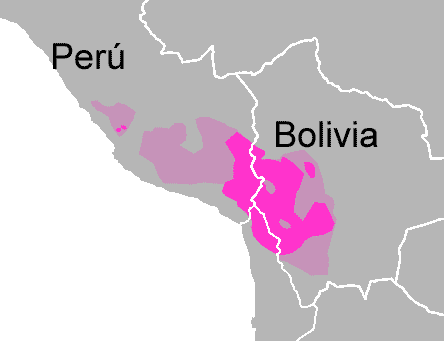
- Dark color: current extent of Aymaran languages. Light color: former extent, as evidenced by place names.

Aymaran (also Jaqi or Aru) is one of the two dominant language families in the central Andes alongside Quechuan. The family consists of Aymara, widely spoken in Bolivia, and the endangered Jaqaru and Kawki languages of Peru.

Hardman (1978) proposed the name Jaqi for the family of languages, Alfredo Torero Aru 'to speak', and Rodolfo Cerrón Palomino Aymaran, with two branches, Southern (or Altiplano) Aymaran and Central Aymaran (Jaqaru and Kawki). Other names for the family are Jaqui (also spelled Haki) and Aimara.

Quechuan languages, especially those of the south, share a large amount of vocabulary with Aymara, and the languages have often been grouped together as Quechumaran. This proposal is controversial, however; the shared vocabulary may be better explained as intensive borrowing due to long-term contact.

== Family division ==
The Aymaran family consists of two languages:

- Aymaran
  - Aymara. Southern and Central dialects divergent and sometimes considered separate languages.
  - Jaqaru (Haqearu, Haqaru, Haq'aru, Aru).

Aymara has approximately 2.2 million speakers; 1.7 million in Bolivia, 350,000 in Peru, and the rest in Chile and Argentina. Jaqaru has approximately 725 speakers in central Peru, and its dialect Kawki had 9 surviving speakers as of 2005.

== History ==
The Aymaran linguistic homeland may have been the southern Peruvian coast, particularly the area of the Paracas culture and the later Nazca culture. Aymaran speakers then migrated into the highlands and played a role in the Huari Empire. Sometime between the collapse of the Tiwanaku Empire and the rise of the Inca, some Aymaran speakers invaded the Altiplano, while others moved to the northwest, presumably ancestral to the Jaqaru and influencing Quechua I. Aymaran varieties were documented in the southern Peruvian highlands (including Lucanas, Chumbivilcas, and Condesuyos) by the 1586 Relaciones geográficas, and they appear to have persisted up until the 19th century. The eastern and southern Bolivian highlands were still predominantly Aymara-speaking around 1600, but may have adopted Quechua as a result of development of the mining industry.

== Language contact ==
Jolkesky (2016) notes that there are lexical similarities with the Kechua, Kunza, Leko, Uru-Chipaya, Arawak, and Pukina language families due to contact.

== Phonology ==
=== Vowels ===
Aymaran languages have only three phonemic vowels /a i u/, which in most varieties of Aymara and Jaqaru are distinguished by length. Length is commonly transcribed using diaereses in Aymara and length diacritics in Jaqaru.

=== Consonants ===
Though Aymaran languages vary in terms of consonant inventories, they have several features in common. Aymara and Jaqaru both contain phonemic stops at labial, alveolar, palatal, velar and uvular points of articulation. Stops are distinguished by ejective and aspirated features. Both also contain alveolar, palatal, and velar fricatives and several central and lateral approximants.

=== Morphophonology ===
Aymaran languages differ from Quechuan languages in that all verbal and nominal roots must end in a vowel, even in loanwords: Spanish habas ("beans") became Aymara hawasa and Jaqaru háwaša. This feature is not found in other Andean languages.

Like Quechuan languages, Aymaran languages are highly agglutinative. However, they differ in that many agglutinative suffixes trigger vowel suppression in the preceding roots. An example is the loss of final vowel in the word apa ("to take"), when it becomes ap-su ("to take out").

== See also ==
- Quechuan and Aymaran spelling shift

== Bibliography ==
- Adelaar, Willem F. H.; Muysken, Pieter (2004). The languages of the Andes. Cambridge language surveys. Cambridge; New York: Cambridge University Press. ISBN 978-0-521-36275-7.
- Campbell, Lyle. (1997). American Indian languages: The historical linguistics of Native America. New York: Oxford University Press. ISBN 0-19-509427-1.
- Kaufman, Terrence. (1994). The native languages of South America. In C. Mosley & R. E. Asher (Eds.), Atlas of the world's languages (pp. 46–76). London: Routledge.
