= Quechumaran languages =

Proposed language family of South America

Quechumaran
- (controversial)
- Geographic distribution: Andes
- Linguistic classification: Proposed language family
- Subdivisions: Quechuan; Aymaran

Language codes
- Glottolog: None

Quechumaran or Kechumaran is a language family proposal that unites Quechua and Aymaran. Quechuan languages, especially those of the south, share a large amount of vocabulary with Aymara. The hypothesis of the existence of Quechuamara was originally posted by linguist Norman McQuown in 1955. Terrence Kaufman finds the proposal reasonably convincing, but Willem Adelaar, a Quechua specialist, believes the similarities to be caused by borrowing during long-term contact. Lyle Campbell suspects that the proposal is valid but does not consider it to have been conclusively proved.

Moulian et al. (2015) posits the Puquina language of the Tiwanaku Empire as a possible source for some of the shared vocabulary between Quechua, Aymara and Mapuche.

== Swadesh lists ==
100-word Swadesh lists of Proto-Aymaran and Proto-Quechuan from Cerrón (2000):

no.	gloss	Proto-Quechuan	Proto-Aymaran
1.	I	*ya-qa	*na-ya
2.	you	*qam	*huma
3.	we	*ya-qa-nčik	*hiwa-sa
4.	this	*kay	*aka
5.	that	*čay	*uka
6.	who?	*pi	*qači
7.	what?	*ima	*qu
8.	not	*mana	*hani
9.	all	*λapa	*taqi
10.	many	*ačka	*aλuqa
11.	one	*ŝuk	*maya
12.	two	*iŝkay	*paya
13.	big	*hatu(n)	*haĉ’a
14.	long	*suni	*suni
15.	small	*učuk	*hisk’a
16.	woman	*warmi	*marmi
17.	man	*qari	*čača
18.	person	*runa	*haqi
19.	fish	*čaλwa	*čǎλwa
20.	bird	*pisqu	*amač’i
21.	dog	*aλqu	*anu(qa)
22.	louse	*usa	*lap’a
23.	tree	*maλki	*quqa
24.	seed	*muhu	*atʰa
25.	leaf	*rapra	*lapʰi
26.	root	*sapʰi	*asu
27.	bark	*qara	*siλp’i
28.	skin	*qara	*lip’iči
29.	flesh	*ayča	*hanči
30.	blood	*yawar	*wila
31.	bone	*tuλu	*ĉ’aka
32.	grease	*wira	*lik’i
33.	egg	*runtu / *ruru	*k’awna
34.	horn	*waqra	*waqra
35.	tail	*ĉupa	*wič’inkʰa
36.	feather	*pʰuru	*pʰuyu
37.	hair	*aqča / *čukča	*nik’uĉa
38.	head	*uma	*p’iqi
39.	ear	*rinri	*hinču
40.	eye	*ñawi	*nawra
41.	nose	*sinqa	*nasa
42.	mouth	*simi	*laka
43.	tooth	*kiru	*laka ĉ’akʰa
44.	tongue	*qaλu	*laqra
45.	claw	*ŝiλu	*šiλu
46.	foot	*ĉaki	*kayu
47.	knee	*qunqur	*qhunquru
48.	hand	*maki	*ampara
49.	belly	*paĉa / *wiksa	*puĉa(ka)
50.	neck	*kunka	*kunka
51.	breasts	*ñuñu	*ñuñu
52.	heart	*ŝunqu	*čuyma
53.	liver	*k’ipĉa(n)	*k’ipĉa
54.	drink	*upya-	*uma-
55.	eat	*mikʰu-	*manq’a- / *palu-
56.	bite	*kani-	*aĉu-
57.	see	*rikʰu-	*uλa-
58.	hear	*uya-	*iša-
59.	know	*yaĉa-	*yaĉi-
60.	sleep	*puñu-	*iki-
61.	die	*wañu-	*hiwa-
62.	kill	*wañu-či-	*hiwa-ya-
63.	swim	*wayt’a-	*tuyu-
64.	fly	*pʰaya-ri-	*hala-
65.	walk	*puri-	*sara- / *wasa-
66.	come	*ŝa-mu-	*huta-
67.	lie	*anĉ’a-ra-	*haqu-ši-
68.	sit	*taya-ku-	*uta-ĉ’a-
69.	stand	*ŝaya-ri-	*saya-
70.	give	*qu-	*čura-
71.	say	*ñi-	*saya-
72.	sun	*rupay	*lupi
73.	moon	*kiλa	*paqši
74.	star	*quyλur	*wara(wara)
75.	water	*yaku	*uma
76.	rain	*tamya / *para	*haλu
77.	stone	*rumi	*qala
78.	sand	*aqu	*č’aλa
79.	earth	*paĉa	*uraqi
80.	cloud	*pʰuyu / *pukutay	*qhinaya / *urpi
81.	smoke	*q’usñi / *quntay	*iwq’i
82.	fire	*nina	*nina
83.	ashes	*uĉpa	*qhiλa
84.	burn	*k’añay	*nak’a-
85.	path	*ñayani	*tʰaki
86.	mountain	*urqu	*quλu
87.	red	*puka	*čupika
88.	green	*q’umir / *ĉiqya(q)	*č’uqña
89.	yellow	*q’iλu / *qarwa	*tuyu
90.	white	*yuraq	*anq’u
91.	black	*yana	*ĉ’iyara
92.	night	*tuta	*aruma
93.	hot	*q’unu	*hunĉ’u
94.	cold	*čiri	*tʰaya
95.	full	*hunta	*pʰuqa
96.	new	*muŝuq	*mačaqa
97.	good	*aλi	*aski
98.	round	*muyu	*muruqu
99.	dry	*čaki	*waña
100.	name	*suti	*suti
