= Jaqaru language =

Aymaran language spoken in Peru

Jaqaru–Cauqui
- Tupe, Jaqi, Aru, Kawki
- Jaqaru
- Native to: Peru
- Region: Yauyos Province
- Ethnicity: 2,000 Jaqaru and Kawki (2000)
- Native speakers: 740 (2004)
- Language family: Aymaran: Jaqaru–Cauqui
- Dialects: Kawki; Jaqaru

Language codes
- ISO 639-3: jqr
- Glottolog: jaqa1244
- ELP: Jaqaru
- Linguasphere: 84-JAA-aa
- 84-JAA-ab
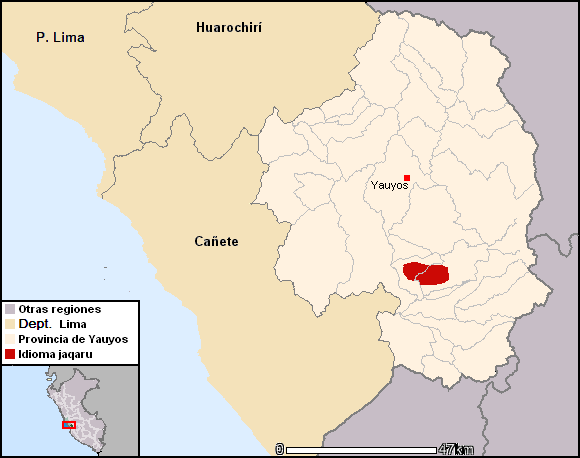
- Distribution of Jaqaru (red).

Jaqaru or Jacaru is a language of the Aymaran family. It is also known as Jaqi and Aru. It is spoken in the districts of Tupe and Catahuasi in Yauyos Province, Lima Region, Peru. Most of the 2,000 ethnic Jaqaru have migrated to Lima.

Kawki (Cauqui), a divergent dialect, is spoken in the nearby communities of Cachuy, Canchán, Caipán and Chavín by a few elderly individuals (9 surviving in early 2005). Hardman has noted that while Jaqaru and Kawki share a degree of mutual intelligibility, speakers of one were unable to understand tape recordings of the other, and in a few cases of marriage between Kawki and Jaqaru speakers, the home language was Spanish. (However, the home language of most Jaqaru and Kawki is now Spanish.) Historical analysis shows that the two languages were out of contact for a period. The name Tupe is used for Jaqaru and Kawki together.

There exist clear differences between Jaqaru and Kawki in regard to morphology. Jaqaru has ten verb persons, whereas Kawki has only nine (due to a case of homophony wherein Kawki maintained the semantic distinction between two different person markers, but lost the form distinction between the two). Additionally, regressive vowel harmony is present throughout the verb person system in Jaqaru, but does not appear in Kawki. Phonologically, Kawki is differentiated from Jaqaru in its vowel system. Jaqaru contains six vowels- three of regular length and three short, whereas Kawki has only the three regular-length vowels.

== Phonology ==
=== Vowels ===
Jaqaru has three phonemic vowels /a i u/, which distinguish two degrees of length. Long vowels /aː iː uː/ are indicated in writing with a grave accent: à ì ù.

=== Consonants ===
		Bilabial	Dental/ Alveolar			Retroflex	Palatal	Velar	Uvular
		Bilabial	plain	palatal	sibilant	Retroflex	Palatal	Velar	Uvular
Nasal		m ⟨m⟩	n ⟨n⟩				ɲ ⟨ñ⟩	ŋ ⟨nh⟩	
Plosive/ Affricate	voiceless	p ⟨p⟩	t ⟨t⟩	ṯʲ ⟨tx⟩	t͡s ⟨tz⟩	ʈʂ ⟨cx⟩	t͡ʃ ⟨ch⟩	k ⟨k⟩	q ⟨q⟩
Plosive/ Affricate	aspirated	pʰ ⟨p’⟩	tʰ ⟨t’⟩	ṯʲʰ ⟨tx’⟩	t͡sʰ ⟨tz’⟩	ʈʂʰ ⟨cx’⟩	t͡ʃʰ ⟨ch’⟩	kʰ ⟨k’⟩	qʰ ⟨q’⟩
Plosive/ Affricate	ejective	pʼ ⟨p’’⟩	tʼ ⟨t’’⟩	ṯʲʼ ⟨tx’’⟩	t͡sʼ ⟨tz’’⟩	ʈʂʼ ⟨cx’’⟩	t͡ʃʼ ⟨ch’’⟩	kʼ ⟨k’’⟩	qʼ ⟨q’’⟩
Fricative					s ⟨s⟩		ʃ ⟨sh⟩	x ⟨j⟩	
Approx.	central	w ⟨w⟩					j ⟨y⟩		
Approx.	lateral		l ⟨l⟩				ʎ ⟨ll⟩		
Tap			ɾ ⟨r⟩						

== Morphology ==
Jaqaru morphology is extremely complex. Most of the grammatical information in Jaqaru is carried in the morphology. The basic person system consists of four persons. In the verb system, these four persons are expanded into a conjugation of ten grammatical person markers, each marking both subject and object in a single suffix. Also characteristic of the Jaqaru morphology (and all of the Jaqi languages) is the use of extensive vowel dropping for grammatical marking. The rules constraining vowel dropping are extensive, and can be conditioned by such things as morpheme identity, morpheme sequence, syntactic requirements, some phonological requirements and suffix requirements. (Hardman, 2000).

The primary form classes are root and suffix. Root classes are verb, noun, and particle; suffix classes are nominal, verbal, thematic, and sentence.

Evidentiality marking is reflected in every sentence of the language. The three major grammatical categories of evidentiality are:

1. personal knowledge (PK)--typically referring to sight
2. knowledge-through-language (KTW)--referring to all that is learned by hearing others speak and by reading
3. non-personal-knowledge (NPK)--used for all myths, histories from longer ago than any living memory, stories, and non-involvement of the speaker in the current situation (Hardman, 2000)

=== Nominal morphology ===
Nominal morphology involves suffixes, with two kinds of nominal suffixes: possession and modification. Noun suffixes consist of two types. One set involves the interplay of nouns with the rest of the sentence (there are 10 of these suffixes: 4 possessives, 5 directionals, and 1 object marker). All other nominal suffixes function to create complex nouns (Hardman, 2000).

Nominal morphology is based on a four-person paradigm which marks the relationship of the second person to the utterance. Therefore, the first person excludes the addressee. Second person excludes the speaker. Third person excludes both the speaker and the addressee, and is used for unmarked or null instances. Fourth person marks the inclusion of both the speaker and the addressee (Hardman, 2000).

=== Verbal morphology ===
Verbal morphology in Jaqaru is extremely complex, in both inflections and derivations. A great deal of the grammatical work of the language is done within the verbal morphological system. The standard paradigm is of ten persons, which define the relationships between the four basic persons (Hardman, 2000, 56):

- 2›2p: none
- 2›1p: -uta, -utumata, and -utusama
- 2›4p: -ushta, -ushtumata, and -ushtusama
- 2›3p: -ta, -mata, and -sama

- 1›2p: -imi, -mama and -shtama
- 1›1p: none
- 1›4p: none
- 1›3p: -t"a, -nha, and -sa

- 4›2p: none
- 4›1p: none
- 4›4p: none
- 4›3p: -tana, -tana, and -sana

- 3›2p: -tama, -matama, and -masama
- 3›1p: -utu, -utuni, and -utusp"a
- 3›4p: -ushtu, -ushtuni, and -ushtusp"a
- 3›3p: -i, -ni, and -sp"a

In Jaqaru (and all other Jaqi languages), the tie between object and subject is one of union; they are not separable morphologically, and conjugation requires simultaneous specification of both as a unit. Verbs are conjugated in two sets: one for principal clauses with ten tenses and one for subordinate clauses with twelve tenses. Verbs ordinarily consist of a minimum of three morphemes. However, typical verbs consist of many more (Hardman, 2000).

== Syntax ==
Syntax in Jaqaru consists mainly of a system of sentence suffixes. These suffixes indicate sentence type (interrogative, declarative, etc.) Suffixes can and often do occur more than one per sentence, marking sentence type and creating complex constructions. Simply put, for sentences to be grammatical in Jaqaru, they must be inflected. Morphological words and syntactic phrases which do not contain a sentence suffix are judged by native speakers to be ungrammatical and for some, impossible to say (Hardman, 2000).

=== Sentence suffixes ===
Sentence suffixes occur after all other morphological processes and can occur on any morphological words or syntactic phrases. The nature of sentence suffixes allows for freedom of word order and creativity in sentence construction, useful to storytellers (Hardman, 2000).

There are seven classes of sentence suffixes in Jaqaru, listed below:

Order classes of sentence suffixes (Hardman, 2000: 92)

- I—Temporal: -kasa (completive) and -ra (continuative)
- II—Aggregational: -rk"a (additive) and -sk"a (sequential)
- III—Categorizer: -sa (information), -txi (negative; yes/no), -wa (PK—personal knowledge), -qa (attenuator; topic), and -psa (aggregational)
- IV—KTL (knowledge through language): -mna ('it is said')
- V—Surprisal: -ja (rhetorical)
- VI—Emphatic: -illi ('really!")
- VII—FinalDS: -ashi ('maybe') and -ishi ('remember')

These suffixes can occur in combination on words and most Class I suffixes rarely appear without another suffix on a morphological word. Classes II, III, and IV occur most frequently and are considered the core of syntactic inflection. It is theoretically possible for all sentence suffixes to occur in a sentence, but no case has ever been found. At most three or four sentence suffixes have been found in a text, as of the year 2000. However, because many morphological suffixes can also be stacked, syntactic words frequently carry up to seven or eight suffixes (Hardman, 2000).

=== Phrases ===
Unlike sentence word order, within phrases a fixed word order is either preferred or obligatory. Two main types of phrases occur in Jaqaru: noun phrases and verb phrases.

Noun Phrases. There are three types of noun phrases: modifier phrases, number phrases, and possessive phrases. Modifier phrases consist of a head noun preceded by a one or more modifier noun, which is marked by vowel dropping. Numbers in Jaqaru are on a base ten scale. Number phrases are carefully ordered to build larger numbers using multipliers of 10, 100, and 1000. The number phrase order is: number x multiplier + number. Neutral, unmarked possessive phrases follow a specific order: possessor + -na + possessed + one of the four personal possessive suffixes (Hardman, 2000). Verb Phrases. Verb phrases in Jaqaru are rare and never consist of more than two parts. There are four fixed order types: the careful phrase, the facultative phrase, the effort phrase, and the OV phrase (vowel-drop modifier + verb root). Verbs can additionally be modified by a quantifier modifier (Hardman, 2000).

=== Particles ===
There are three types of particles in Jaqaru: negatives, greetings, and a few special ones. Three particles are used for negation: imperative negative, principle negative, and subordinate negative. Four greetings are used in Jaqaru for addressing people, which mark the sex of the speaker and the addressee and do not carry any suffixes of any kind. Four special particles take no suffixes and comprise utterances in and of themselves: Jira (“Let's go”), Jalli (“I don't know, could be.”), Wala (“Go on, get going, bye.”), and Chiku (“I'm going, I'm off, bye.”) (Hardman, 2000: 115).

== See also ==
- Aymara language
- Aymaran
- Quechua language

== Bibliography ==
- Belleza Castro, N. (1995). Vocabulario jacaru-castellano/castellano-jacaru (aimara tupino). (Monumenta Lingüística Andina, 3.) Cuzco: Centro "Bartolome de Las Casas".
- Hardman, Martha James 1978. "Jaqi: The Linguistic Family". The International Journal of American Linguistics. Volume 44. pp. 146–153.
- Hardman-de-Bautista, Martha James 1978. "Linguistic Postulates and Applied Anthropological Linguistics". In V. Honsa and M. J. Hardman-de-Bautista (eds) Papers on Linguistics and Child Language. New York: Mouton Publishers.
- Hardman, Martha James 1983. "'And if We Lose Our Name, Then What About Our Land', or What Price Development?" Evaluating Gender Relations Volume 35, number 3. pp. 151–161.
- Hardman, Martha James 2000. Jaqaru. Germany: Lincom Europa.
