= Aymara language =

Indigenous language of South America

Aymara
- Aymar aru
- Pronunciation: [ˈajmaɾ ˈaɾu]
- Native to: Bolivia; Chile; Peru; Argentina
- Ethnicity: Aymara
- Native speakers: 1.7 million (2007–2014)
- Language family: Aymaran: Aymara
- Writing system: Latin script

Official status
- Official language in: Bolivia; Peru (Note: Official only in Aymara-dominated areas.)
- Recognised minority language in: Chile; Argentina

Language codes
- ISO 639-1: ay
- ISO 639-2: aym
- ISO 639-3: aym – inclusive code Individual codes: ayr – Central Aymara ayc – Southern Aymara
- Glottolog: nucl1667
- ELP: Aymara
- Linguasphere: 84-JAB-a
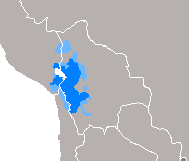
- Areas where it is the majority language Areas where it is the minority language

Aymara (Aymara pronunciation: [ajˈmaɾa]; also Aymar aru) is an Aymaran language spoken by the Aymara people of the Bolivian Andes. It is one of only a handful of Amerindian languages with over one million speakers. Aymara, along with Spanish and Quechua, is an official language in Bolivia and Peru. It is also spoken, to a much lesser extent, by some communities in northern Chile and northern Argentina, where it is a recognized minority language.

Academic sources confirm that Aymara is spoken in Argentina, particularly in the provinces of Jujuy and Salta. Aymara is recognized as one of the indigenous language families within the country, often grouped alongside others such as Quechua, Mapuche, and Guaraní. The University of Arizona identifies the Kolla people, who speak Aymara, as having a significant presence in these provinces.

The expansion of the Aymaran language family predates the expansion of the Quechuan language family across the southern Peruvian Andes.

Some linguists have claimed that Aymara is related to its more widely spoken neighbor, Quechua. That claim, however, is disputed. Although there are indeed similarities, the majority position among linguists today is that the similarities are better explained as areal features arising from prolonged cohabitation, rather than natural genealogical changes that would stem from a common protolanguage.

Aymara is an agglutinating and, to a certain extent, a polysynthetic language. It has a subject–object–verb word order. Aymara is normally written using the Latin alphabet.

== Etymology ==
The ethnonym "Aymara" may come from the name of a group in the southern part of what is now the Quechua speaking area of Apurímac. Regardless, the use of the word "Aymara" as a label for this people was standard practice as early as 1567, as evident from Garci Diez de San Miguel's report of his inspection of the province of Chucuito (1567, 14; cited in Lafaye 1964). In this document, he uses the term aymaraes to refer to the people. The language was then called Colla. It is believed that Colla was the name of an Aymara nation at the time of conquest, and later was the southernmost region of the Inca empire Collasuyu. However, Cerrón Palomino disputes this and asserts that Colla were Puquina speakers who ruled Tiwanaku in the first and third centuries (2008:246). This hypothesis suggests that the linguistically-diverse area ruled by the Puquina came to adopt Aymara languages in their southern region.

In any case, the use of "Aymara" for the language may have first occurred in the works of Polo de Ondegardo, a lawyer, magistrate and tax collector in Potosí and Cusco. Do Ondegardo, who later helped Viceroy Toledo to create the system under which the indigenous population would be ruled for the next 200 years, wrote a report in 1559 entitled 'On the lineage of the Yncas and how they extended their conquests' in which he discusses land and taxation issues of the Aymara under the Inca Empire.

More than a century passed before "Aymara" entered general use to mean the language spoken by the Aymara people (Briggs, 1976:14). In the meantime the Aymara language was called "the language of the Colla". The best account of the history of Aymara is that of Cerrón-Palomino, who shows that the ethnonym Aymara, which came from the glottonym, is likely derived from the Quechuaized toponym ayma-ra-y 'place of communal property'. The entire history of this term is thoroughly outlined in his book, Voces del Ande (2008:19–32) and Lingüística Aimara.

The suggestion that "Aymara" comes from the Aymara words "jaya" (ancient) and "mara" (year, time) is almost certainly a mistaken folk etymology.

== Classification ==
It is often assumed that the Aymara language descends from the language spoken in Tiwanaku because it is the native language of that area today. That is far from certain, and most specialists now think that Aymara did not expand into the Tiwanaku area until recently, as it spread southwards from an original homeland, more likely to have been in Central Peru. Aymara placenames are found all the way north into central Peru. Indeed, (Altiplano) Aymara is one of two surviving members of a wider language family, the other being Jaqaru.

The family was established by the research of Lucy Briggs (a fluent speaker) and Martha Hardman de Bautista of the Program in Linguistics at the University of Florida. Jaqaru [jaqi aru = human language] and Kawki communities are in the district of Tupe, Yauyos Valley, in the Dept. of Lima, in central Peru. Terminology for this wider language family is not well established. Hardman has proposed the name 'Jaqi' ('human') while other Peruvian linguists have proposed alternatives. Alfredo Torero uses the term 'Aru' ('speech'); Rodolfo Cerrón-Palomino, meanwhile, has proposed that 'Aymara' should be used for the whole family, distinguished into two branches, Southern (or Altiplano) Aymara and Central Aymara (Jaqaru and Kawki). Each of these proposals has followers in Andean linguistics. In English, some linguists use the term Aymaran languages for the family and reserve 'Aymara' for the Altiplano branch.

== Dialects ==
There is some degree of regional variation within Aymara, but all dialects are mutually intelligible.

Most studies of the language focused on either the Aymara spoken on the southern Peruvian shore of Lake Titicaca or the Aymara spoken around La Paz. Lucy Therina Briggs classifies both regions as being part of the Northern Aymara dialect, which encompasses the department of La Paz in Bolivia and the department of Puno in Peru. The Southern Aymara dialect is spoken in the eastern half of the Tarapacá Region in northern Chile and in most of the Bolivian department of Oruro. It is also found in northern Potosi and southwest Cochabamba but is slowly being replaced by Quechua in those regions.

Intermediate Aymara shares dialectical features with both Northern and Southern Aymara and is found in the eastern half of the Tacna and Moquegua departments in southern Peru and in the northeastern tip of Chile.

== Geographical distribution ==
Aymara language domain as of 1984

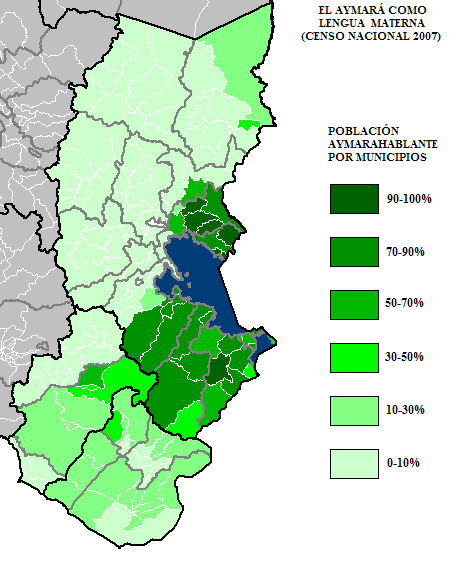
Distribution of the Aymara language within three southern departments in Peru: Puno, Moquegua, Tacna.

There are roughly two million Bolivian speakers, half a million Peruvian speakers, and perhaps a few thousand speakers in Chile. At the time of the Spanish conquest in the sixteenth century, Aymara was the dominant language over a much larger area than today, including most of highland Peru south of Cusco. Over the centuries, Aymara has gradually lost speakers both to Spanish and to Quechua; many Peruvian and Bolivian communities that were once Aymara-speaking now speak Quechua.

== Phonology ==
=== Vowels ===
Aymara has three phonemic vowel qualities /a i u/, which, in most varieties of the language, occur as either long or short (i.e. /aː a iː i uː u/). Long vowels are indicated in the spelling with a diaeresis in writing: ä, ï, ü. The high vowels /i u/ occur as mid-high [e o] when near uvular consonants /q qʰ qʼ χ/. The three vowel sounds are heard as [ə, ɪ, ʊ] when in unstressed positions.

Vowel deletion is frequent in Aymara. Vowel deletion typically occurs due to one of three factors: (i) phonotactic, (ii) syntactic, and (iii) morphophonemic.

- Phonotactic vowel deletion takes the shape of hiatus reduction when two vowels co-occur through word construction or through suffixation. In such environments, one vowel deletes. (i) if one of the two vowels is /u/, the other vowels assimilate to it, (ii) if the vowels are /i/ and /a/, /a/ assimilates. (iii) If the sequence is composed of two identical vowels, one will delete.
- Vowel elision can be syntactically conditioned. For example, in nominal compounds and noun phrases, all adjectival/nominal modifiers with three or more vowels in a modifier + nucleus NP lose their final vowel.
- Morphemic vowel deletion is the most common. Some suffixes never co-occur with the preceding vowel in the root, whereas others lose their own vowel in certain environments. Patterns of morphophonological vowel deletion derive from historical changes that affected individual suffixes differently, so that no clear patterns emerge.

=== Consonants ===
Aymara has phonemic stops at the labial, alveolar, palatal, velar and uvular points of articulation. Stops show no distinction of voice (e.g. there is no phonemic contrast between [p] and [b]), but each stop occurs in three laryngeal settings: plain or voiceless unaspirated (aka tenuis), glottalized, and aspirated. Sounds such as [ʃ, h, ŋ] occur as allophones of /t͡ʃ, χ, n/. Aymara also has a tapped /ɾ/, and an alveolar/palatal contrast for nasals and laterals, as well as two semivowels (/w/ and /j/).

Orthographic representation is the same as the IPA where not shown.

		Bilabial	Dental/ Alveolar	Palatal (-alveolar)	Velar	Uvular	Glottal
Nasal		m	n	ɲ ⟨ñ⟩	(ŋ) ⟨nh⟩		
Plosive/ Affricate	tenuis	p	t	t͡ʃ ⟨ch⟩	k	q	
Plosive/ Affricate	aspirated	pʰ ⟨ph⟩	tʰ ⟨th⟩	t͡ʃʰ ⟨chh⟩	kʰ ⟨kh⟩	qʰ ⟨qh⟩	
Plosive/ Affricate	ejective	pʼ	tʼ	t͡ʃʼ ⟨chʼ⟩	kʼ	qʼ	
Fricative			s	(ʃ)	x ⟨j⟩	χ ⟨x⟩	(h)
Sonorant	median		ɾ ⟨r⟩	j ⟨y⟩	w		
Sonorant	lateral		l	ʎ ⟨ll⟩			

=== Stress ===
Stress is usually on the second-to-last syllable, but long vowels may shift it. Although the final vowel of a word is elided except at the end of a phrase, the stress remains unchanged.

=== Syllable structure ===
The vast majority of roots are disyllabic and, with few exceptions, suffixes are monosyllabic. Roots conform to the template (C)V(C)CV, with CVCV being predominant. The majority of suffixes are CV, though there are some exceptions: CVCV, CCV, CCVCV and even VCV are possible but rare.

The agglutinative nature of this predominantly suffixing language, coupled with morphophonological alternations caused by vowel deletion and phonologically conditioned constraints, gives rise to interesting surface structures that operate in the domain of the morpheme, syllable, and phonological word/phrase. The phonological/morphophonological processes observed include syllabic reduction, epenthesis, deletion, and reduplication.

== Orthography ==
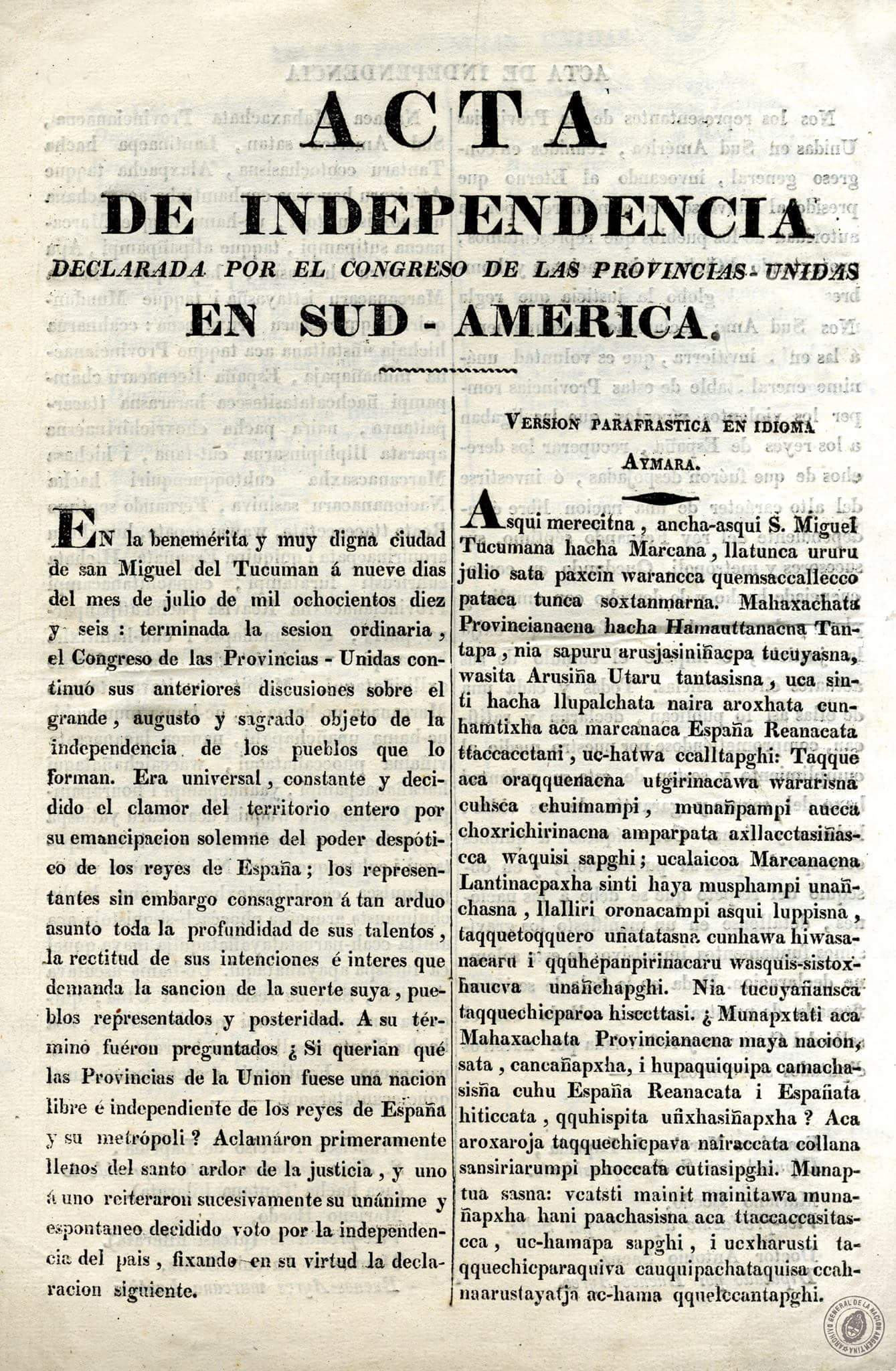
Declaration of Independence of the United Provinces of South America (present-day Argentina) in Spanish and Aymara

Beginning with Spanish missionary efforts, there have been many attempts to create a writing system for Aymara. The colonial sources employed a variety of writing systems heavily influenced by Spanish, the most widespread one being that of Bertonio. Many of the early grammars employed unique alphabets as well as the one of Middendorf's Aymara-Sprache (1891).

The first official alphabet to be adopted for Aymara was the Scientific Alphabet. It was approved by the III Congreso Indigenista Interamericano de la Paz in 1954, though its origins can be traced as far back as 1931. Rs. No 1593 (Deza Galindo 1989, 17). It was the first official record of an alphabet, but in 1914, Sisko Chukiwanka Ayulo and Julián Palacios Ríos had recorded what may be the first of many attempts to have one alphabet for both Quechua and Aymara, the Syentifiko Qheshwa-Aymara Alfabeto with 37 graphemes.

Several other attempts followed, with varying degrees of success. Some orthographic attempts even expand further: the Alfabeto Funcional Trilingüe, made up of 40 letters (including the voiced stops necessary for Spanish) and created by the Academia de las Lenguas Aymara y Quechua in Puno in 1944 is the one used by the lexicographer Juan Francisco Deza Galindo in his Diccionario Aymara – Castellano / Castellano – Aymara. This alphabet has five vowels ⟨a, e, i, o, u⟩, aspiration is conveyed with an ⟨h⟩ next to the consonant, and ejectives with ⟨'⟩. The most unusual characteristic is the expression of the uvular /χ/ with ⟨jh⟩. The other uvular segment, /q/, is expressed by ⟨q⟩, but transcription rules mandate that the following vowel must be ⟨a, e, o⟩ (not ⟨i, u⟩), presumably to account for uvular lowering and to facilitate multilingual orthography.

The alphabet created by the Comisión de Alfabetización y Literatura Aymara (CALA) was officially recognized in Bolivia in 1968 (co-existing with the 1954 Scientific Alphabet). Besides being the alphabet employed by Protestant missionaries, it is also the one used for the translation of the Book of Mormon. Also in 1968, de Dios Yapita created his take on the Aymara alphabet at the Instituto de Lenga y Cultura Aymara (ILCA).

Nearly 15 years later, the Servicio Nacional de Alfabetización y Educación Popular (SENALEP) attempted to consolidate these alphabets to create a system which could be used to write both Aymara and Quechua, creating what was known as the Alfabeto Unificado. The alphabet, later sanctioned in Bolivia by Decree 20227 on 9 May 1984 and in Peru as la Resolución Ministerial Peruana 1218ED on 18 November 1985, consists of 3 vowels, 26 consonants and an umlaut to mark vowel length. The orthography was shown in the phonological table in the previous section, and is the same where angle brackets are not shown.

In 2015 a full writing system was developed for Aymara using the Korean script Hangeul.

== Morphology ==
Aymara is a highly agglutinative, predominantly suffixing language. All suffixes can be categorized into the nominal, verbal, transpositional and those not subcategorized for lexical category (including stem-external word-level suffixes and phrase-final suffixes), as below:

- Nominal and verbal morphology is characterized by derivational- and inflectional-like suffixes as well as non-productive suffixes.
- Transpositional morphology consists of verbalizers (that operate on the root or phrasal levels) and nominalizers (including an action nominalizer, an agentive, and a resultative).
- Suffixes not subcategorized for lexical category can be divided into three stem-external, word-level suffixes (otherwise known as "independent suffixes") and around a dozen phrase-final suffixes (otherwise known as "sentence suffixes").

=== Nominal suffixes ===
- Non-productive nominal suffixes vary considerably by variant but typically include those below. Some varieties additionally also have (1) the suffix -wurasa (< Spanish 'horas'), which expresses 'when' on aka 'this', uka 'that' and kuna 'what'; (2) temporal suffixes -unt ~ -umt; and (3) -kucha, which attaches to only two roots, jani 'no' and jicha 'now':
  - kinship suffixes, including -la, -lla, -chi, and/or -ta
  - the expression of size with -chʼa
  - the suffix -sa 'side', which attaches to only the demonstratives and kawki 'where'
- Nominal derivational-like suffixes:
  - diminutive suffixes
  - delimitative suffix -chapi
- Nominal inflectional-like suffixes:
  - Attributive suffix -ni
  - Possessive paradigm
  - Plural -naka
  - Reciprocal/inclusor -pacha
  - Case suffixes – Syntactic relations are generally case-marked, with the exception of the unmarked subject. Case is affixed to the last element of a noun phrase, usually corresponding to the head. Most varieties of Aymara have 14 cases (though in many, the genitive and locative have merged into a single form): ablative -ta, accusative (indicated by vowel suppression), allative -ru, benefactive -taki, comparative -jama, genitive -na, instrumental/comitative -mpi, interactive -pura, locative -na, limitative -kama, nominative (zero), perlative -kata, purposive -layku.

=== Verbal suffixes ===
All verbs require at least one suffix to be grammatical.

- Verbal derivational-like suffixes
  - Direction of motion — Although these suffixes are quite productive, they are not obligatory. The meaning of a word which is affixed with a member of this category is often but not always predictable, and the word formed may have a different meaning than the root.
  - Spatial location — The nine spatial locations suffixes are likewise highly productive and not obligatory. Similarly, the meaning of the word that contains a member of this category is typically (but not consistently) predictable. There are also contexts in which the word formed has a meaning that significantly differs from that of the root to which it attaches.
  - Valency-increasing — The five valency increasing suffixes may occur on a wide range of verbs but are not obligatory. The meaning expressed when a word receives one of these suffixes is predictable.
  - Multipliers/reversers — The two multipliers/reversers are comparatively less productive and are not obligatory. In some contexts, attachment to a verb conveys a reverser meaning and effectively express the opposite of the meaning of the plain root. In this respect, the multipliers/reversers are the most derivational-like of all the suffixes discussed so far.
  - Aspect — This category is complicated insofar as it is made up of a diverse array of suffix types, some of which are more productive and/or obligatory than others.
  - Others — In some varieties of Aymara, there are three suffixes not classified into the categories above: the verbal comparative -jama, the category buffer -(w)jwa, and the intensifier -paya. Semantically, these three suffixes do not have much in common. They also vary with respect to the degree which they may be classified as more derivational-like or more inflectional-like.
- Verbal inflectional-like suffixes:
  - Person/tense — Person and tense are fused into a unitary suffix. These forms are among the most inflectional-like of the verbal suffixes insofar as they are all obligatory and productive. The so-called personal-knowledge tenses include the simple (non-past) and the proximal past. The non-personal knowledge tenses includes the future and distal past.
  - Number — The plural verbal suffix, -pha (just as the nominal one,-naka) is optional. Thus, while pluralization is very productive, it is not obligatory.
  - Mood and modality — Mood and modality includes mood, evidentials, event modality, and the imperative. These suffixes are both productive and obligatory. Their semantic affect is usually transparent.

=== Transpositional suffixes ===
A given word can take several transpositional suffixes:

- Verbalizers: There are six suffixes whose primary function is to verbalize nominal roots (not including the reflexive -si and the propagative -tata). These forms can be subdivided into two groups, (1) phrase verbalizers and (2) root verbalizers.
- Nominalizers: There are three suffixes are used to derive nouns: the agentive -iri, the resultative -ta, and the action nominalizer (sometimes glossed as the "infinitive" in some descriptions) -ña.

=== Suffixes not subcategorized for lexical categories ===
There are two kinds of suffixes not subcategorized for lexical categories:

- Stem external word-final suffixes (sometimes known as "independent suffixes") — There are three suffixes that are not classifiable as members of either nominal or verbal morphology and are not phrase-final suffixes: the emphatic -puni, the delimitative -ki, and the additive -raki
- Phrase-final suffixes (sometimes known as "sentence suffixes" in the literature) — Most Aymara phrases have at least one of the eleven (depending on variant) possible phrase-final suffixes to be grammatical. The phrase-final suffix must appear minimally on a noun, noun phrase, verb, or verb phrase (note that two phrase-final suffixes, the additive -sa and the confirmatory -pi appear exclusively on nouns but otherwise pattern with phrase-final suffixes and so may not be best treated with nominal morphology). Exceptions to the requirement that a phrase has at least one phrase-final suffix are mainly limited to imperative constructions.

== Idiosyncrasies ==
Linguistic and gestural analysis by Núñez and Sweetser also asserts that the Aymara have an apparently unique (or at least very rare) understanding of time. Aymara is, with Quechua, one of very few [Núñez & Sweetser, 2006, p. 403] languages in which speakers seem to represent the past as in front of them and the future as behind them. Their argument is mainly within the framework of conceptual metaphor, which recognizes in general two subtypes of the metaphor "the passage of time is motion": one is "time passing is motion over a landscape" (or "moving-ego"), and the other is "time passing is a moving object" ("moving-events"). The latter metaphor does not explicitly involve the individual/speaker. Events are in a queue, with prior events towards the front of the line. The individual may be facing the queue, or it may be moving from left to right in front of him/her.

The claims regarding Aymara involve the moving-ego metaphor. Most languages conceptualize the ego as moving forward into the future, with ego's back to the past. The English sentences prepare for what lies before us and we are facing a prosperous future exemplify the metaphor. In contrast, Aymara seems to encode the past as in front of individuals and the future behind them. That is typologically a rare phenomenon [Núñez & Sweetser, 2006, p. 416].

The fact that English has words like before and after that are (currently or archaically) polysemous between 'front/earlier' or 'back/later' may seem to refute the claims regarding Aymara uniqueness. However, those words relate events to other events and are part of the moving-events metaphor. In fact, when before means in front of ego, it can mean only future. For instance, our future is laid out before us while our past is behind us. Parallel Aymara examples describe future days as qhipa uru, literally 'back days', and they are sometimes accompanied by gestures to behind the speaker. The same applies to Quechua-speakers, whose expression qhipa pʼunchaw corresponds directly to Aymara qhipa uru. Possibly, the metaphor is from the fact that the past is visible (in front of one's eyes), but the future is not.

== Pedagogy ==
There is increasing use of Aymara locally and there are increased numbers learning the language, both Bolivian and abroad. In Bolivia and Peru, intercultural bilingual education programs with Aymara and Spanish have been introduced in the last two decades. There are even projects to offer Aymara through the internet, such as by ILCA.

== Sample ==
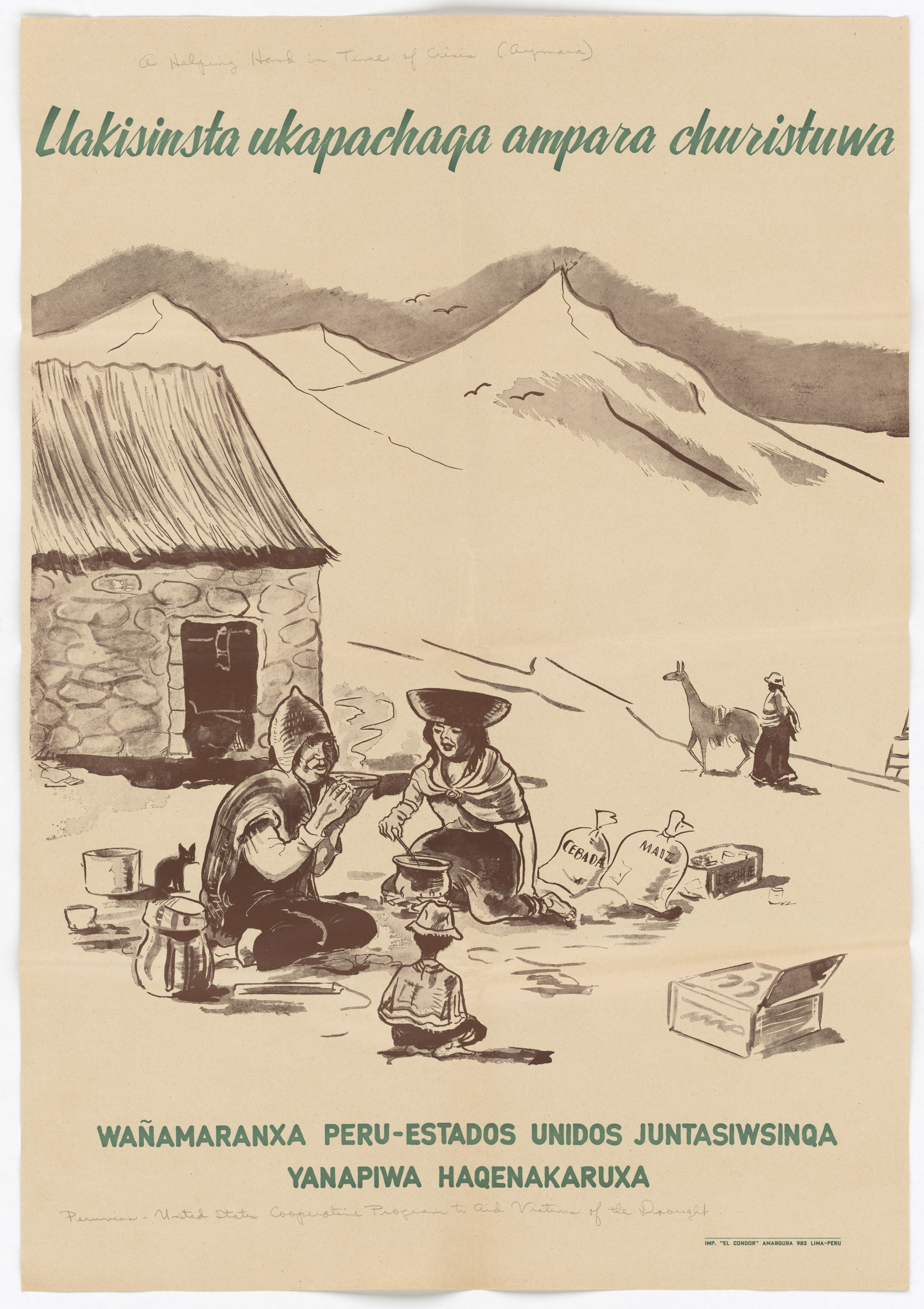
"A Helping Hand in Time of Crisis," from the United States Information Agency, 1958

The following is a sample text in Aymara, Article 1 of the Universal Declaration of Human Rights (by the United Nations):

Taqi jaqinakaxa qhispiyata yuripxi ukhamaraki jerarquía ukhamaraki derechos ukanakana kikipa. {} Jupanakax amuyt’añampi ukat concienciampi phuqt’atapxiwa ukat maynit maynikamaw jilat kullakanakjam sarnaqapxañapa.
/ˈtaqi haqinaˈkaχa qʰispiˈjata juˈɾipχi ukʰamaˈɾaki hiɾaɾˈkia ukʰamaˈɾaki diˈɾitʃus ukanaˈkana kiˈkipa | hupaˈnakaχ amujtʼaˈɲampi ˈukat kunsiinsiˈampi pʰuqtʼatapˈχiwa ˈukat ˈmajnit majnˈkamaw ˈhilat kuʎakaˈnakham saɾnaqapχaˈɲapa/
All human beings are born free and equal in ranking and rights. They are endowed with reason and conscience and should act towards one another in a spirit of brotherhood.

== See also ==
- Jaqaru language
- Indigenous languages of the Americas
- Languages of Peru
- List of Spanish words of Indigenous American Indian origin

== Sources ==
- Coler, Matt. A Grammar of Muylaqʼ Aymara: Aymara as spoken in Southern Peru . Brill: Leiden, 2014.
- Núñez, R. E.; Sweetser, E. (2006). "With the Future Behind Them: Convergent Evidence From Aymara Language and Gesture in the Crosslinguistic Comparison of Spatial Construals of Time". Cognitive Science. 30 (3): 401–450. doi:10.1207/s15516709cog0000_62. PMID 21702821.

Indigenous languages of the Americas with Wikipedia
Item	Label/en	native label	Code	distribution map	number of speakers, writers, or signers	UNESCO language status	Ethnologue language status	?itemwiki
Q36806	Southern Quechua	qu:Urin Qichwa qu:Qhichwa qu:Qichwa	qu		6000000	2 vulnerable		Quechua Wikipedia
Q35876	Guarani	gn:Avañe'ẽ	gn		4850000	1 safe	1 National	Guarani Wikipedia
Q4627	Aymara	ay:Aymar aru	ay		4000000	2 vulnerable		Aymara Wikipedia
Q13300	Nahuatl	nah:Nawatlahtolli nah:nawatl nah:mexkatl	nah		1925620	2 vulnerable		Nahuatl Wikipedia
Q891085	Wayuu	guc:Wayuunaiki	guc		300000	2 vulnerable	5 Developing	Wayuu Wikipedia
Q33730	Mapudungun	arn:Mapudungun	arn		300000	3 definitely endangered	6b Threatened	Mapuche Wikipedia
Q13310	Navajo	nv:Diné bizaad nv:Diné	nv		169369	2 vulnerable	6b Threatened	Navajo Wikipedia
Q25355	Greenlandic	kl:Kalaallisut	kl		56200	2 vulnerable	1 National	Greenlandic Wikipedia
Q29921	Inuktitut	ike-cans:ᐃᓄᒃᑎᑐᑦ iu:Inuktitut	iu		39770	2 vulnerable		Inuktitut Wikipedia
Q33388	Cherokee	chr:ᏣᎳᎩ ᎧᏬᏂᎯᏍᏗ chr:ᏣᎳᎩ	chr		12300	4 severely endangered	8a Moribund	Cherokee Wikipedia
Q33390	Cree	cr:ᐃᔨᔨᐤ ᐊᔨᒧᐎᓐ' cr:nēhiyawēwin	cr		10875; 8040			Cree Wikipedia
Q32979	Choctaw	cho:Chahta anumpa cho:Chahta	cho		9200	2 vulnerable	6b Threatened	Choctaw Wikipedia
Q56590	Atikamekw	atj:Atikamekw Nehiromowin atj:Atikamekw	atj		6160	2 vulnerable	5 Developing	Atikamekw Wikipedia
Q27183	Iñupiaq	ik:Iñupiatun	ik		5580	4 severely endangered		Inupiat Wikipedia
Q523014	Muscogee	mus:Mvskoke	mus		4300	3 definitely endangered	7 Shifting	Muscogee Wikipedia
Q33265	Cheyenne	chy:Tsêhesenêstsestôtse	chy		2400	3 definitely endangered	8a Moribund	Cheyenne Wikipedia
