= Rodolfo Cerrón-Palomino =

Peruvian linguist

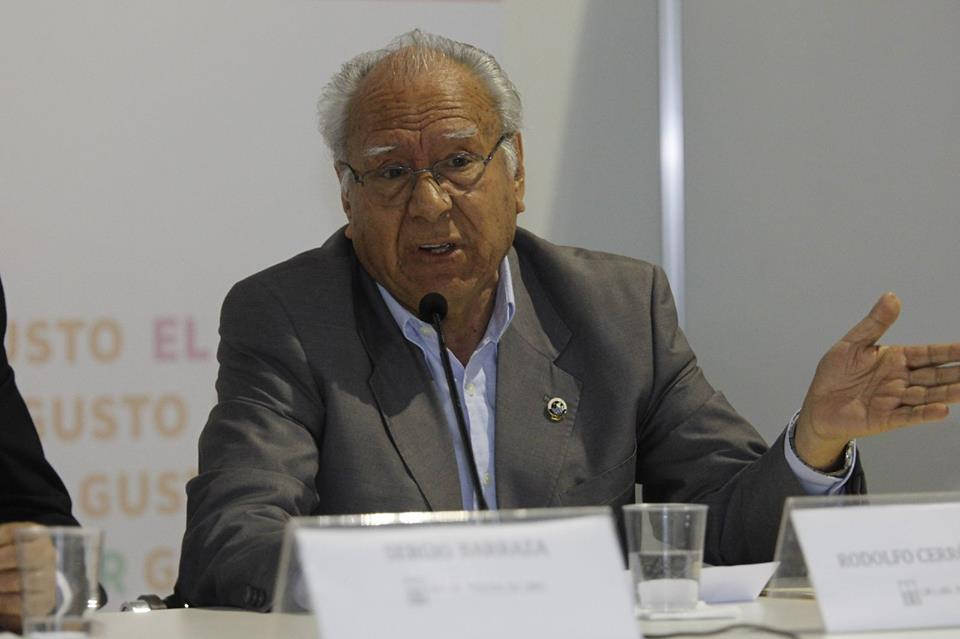
Rodolfo Cerrón Palomino in 2015.

Rodolfo Marcial Cerrón-Palomino Balbín (born February 10, 1940, in Huancayo, Peru) is a Peruvian linguist who has crucially contributed to the investigation and development of the Quechuan languages. He has also made outstanding contributions to the study of the Aymara, Mochica and Chipaya languages.

== Biography ==
He pursued his first degree at the National University of San Marcos in Lima. After graduating, he obtained his master's degree at Cornell University and his Ph.D. degree at the University of Illinois at Urbana–Champaign. He started his studies by researching the Quechuan variety spoken in his homeland: the Mantaro Valley region. Engaged by the Peruvian Ministry of Education, he wrote the first grammar and dictionary of Wanka Quechua, both published in 1976. He has fought strongly for preservation and development of Quechua in all of its varieties. In 1994 he published a dictionary of Southern Quechua, proposing a unified orthographic standard for all Quechua of southern Peru, Bolivia and Argentina. This standard has been accepted by many institutions in Peru and is used officially for Quechua in Bolivia, as well as on the Wikipedia Quechua pages.

Cerrón-Palomino is currently a professor in linguistics at the Pontifical Catholic University of Peru in Lima.

== Works (selection) ==
- 1976 Diccionario quechua Junín-Huanca. Ministerio de educación del Perú
- 1976 Gramática quechua Junín-Huanca. Ministerio de educación del Perú
- 1987 Unidad y diferenciación lingüística en el mundo andino. Lexis, 11: 1, pp. 71–010-t. También en López, Luis Enrique (Comp.) Pesquisas en lingüística andina. Lima: Gráfica Bellido, pp. 121–152.
- 1987 Lingüística Quechua. Cuzco, Perú: Bartolomé de Las Casas
- 1989 Quechua y mochica: lenguas en contacto. Lexis, 13: 1, pp. 47–68.
- 1989 Lengua y sociedad en el Valle del Mantaro. Lima: Instituto de Estudios Peruanos.
- 1990 Reconsideración del llamado quechua costeño. Revista Andina, 16: 2, pp. 335–409.
- 1991 El Inca Garcilaso o la lealtad idiomática. Lexis, 1.5: 2, pp. 133–178.
- 1992 Diversidad y unificación léxica en el mundo andino. En Godenzzi, Juan Carlos (Comp.) El quechua en debate: ideología normal y enseñanza. Cuzco: C.E.R.A. "Bartolomé de Las Casas", pp. 205–235.
- 1993 Los fragmentos de Gramática del Inca Garcilaso. Lexis, 17: 2, pp. 219–257.
- 1994 Quechua sureño, diccionario unificado quechua-castellano, castellano-quechua. Lima, Biblioteca Nacional del Perú.
- 1994 Quechumara. Estructuras paralelas del quechua y del aymara. Lima: CIPA, 42
- 1995 La lengua de Naimlap (reconstrucción y obsolescencia del mochica). Lima: Fondo editorial de la PUC.
- 1996 "El Nebrija indiano". Prólogo a la edición de la Grammatica de Fray Domingo de Santo Tomás, Cuzco: C.E.R.A. Bartolomé de las Casas.
- 1998 El cantar de Inca Yupanqui y la lengua secreta de los incas. Revista Andina, 32, pp. 417–452.
- 1999 Tras las huellas del aimara cuzqueño. Revista Andina, 33, pp. 137–161.
- 2000 Lingüística aimara Cuzco: C.E.R.A. Bartolomé de Las Casas.
- 2003. Castellano Andino. Aspectos sociolingüísticos, pedagógicos y gramaticales. Lima: PUCP.
- 2006 El chipaya o la lengua de los hombres del agua. Lima: PUCP.
- 2008 Voces del Ande. Ensayos sobre Onomástica Andina. Lima: PUCP.
