= Qarwa K'anti =

Mountain in Peru

- Location within Peru

Highest point
- Elevation: 5,000 m (16,000 ft)
- Coordinates: 12°58′42″S 75°09′29″W

Geography
- Location: Peru, Huancavelica Region
- Parent range: Andes, Chunta

Qarwa K'anti (Quechua qarwa pale, yellowish, golden, k'anti a kind of distaff, "yellowish distaff", Hispanicized spelling Jarhuacante) is a mountain in the Chunta mountain range in the Andes of Peru, about 5,000 metres (16,404 ft) high. It lies in the Huancavelica Region, Castrovirreyna Province, on the border of the districts of Castrovirreyna and Santa Ana, and in the Huancavelica Province, Huancavelica District. Qarwa K'anti lies south of Wachu Intiyuq, southwest of Antarasu and north of Yawar Q'asa.
