= Kunkayuq =

Mountain in Peru

- Location within Peru

Highest point
- Elevation: 5,000 m (16,000 ft)
- Coordinates: 12°39′55″S 75°24′00″W

Geography
- Location: Peru, Huancavelica Region
- Parent range: Andes, Chunta

Kunkayuq (Quechua kunka throat, gullet -yuq a suffix to indicate ownership, "the one with a throat (or gullet)", Hispanicized spelling Cuncayoc) is a mountain in the northern part of the Chunta mountain range in the Andes of Peru, about 5,000 m (16,404 ft) high. It is located in the Huancavelica Region, Huancavelica Province, Acobambilla District. Kunkayuq lies southeast of Anqasqucha and Huch'uy Anqas. The lakes named Chiliqucha and Anqasqucha are southwest and northwest of the mountain.
