= Llaqta Qulluy =

Llaqta Qulluy (Quechua llaqta place (village, town, city, country, nation), qulluy to die out, become extinct; to fail, "extinct town", also spelled Llaccta Ccolloy, Llacta Ccolloy, Llaqta Qolloy, Llactaccolloy) may refer to:

- Llaqta Qulluy, Acoria, an archaeological site in the Acoria District, Huancavelica Province, Huancavelica Region, Peru
- Llaqta Qulluy, Conayca, an archaeological site in the Conayca District, Huancavelica Province, Huancavelica Region, Peru
- Llaqta Qulluy, Tayacaja, an archaeological site in the Ahuaycha District, Tayacaja Province, Huancavelica Region, Peru
- Llaqta Qulluy, Vilca, an archaeological site in the Vilca District, Huancavelica Province, Huancavelica Region, Peru
