= Puka Q'asa (Castrovirreyna-Huancavelica) =

Mountain in Peru

- Location within Peru

Highest point
- Elevation: 4,800 m (15,700 ft)
- Coordinates: 12°57′27″S 75°10′21″W

Geography
- Location: Peru, Huancavelica Region
- Parent range: Andes, Chunta

Puka Q'asa (Quechua puka red, q'asa mountain pass, "red mountain pass", Hispanicized spelling Pucajasa) is a mountain in the Chunta mountain range in the Andes of Peru, about 4,800 metres (15,748 ft) high. It lies in the Huancavelica Region, Castrovirreyna Province, Castrovirreyna District, and in the Huancavelica Province, Huancavelica District. Puka Q'asa lies at the Yuraq Ranra valley west of Wachu Intiyuq. Its intermittent stream flows to the Kachimayu in the north.
