= Ichhu Rutuna =

Mountain in Peru

- Location within Peru

Highest point
- Elevation: 5,000 m (16,000 ft)
- Coordinates: 12°51′05″S 75°24′41″W

Geography
- Location: Peru, Huancavelica Region
- Parent range: Andes, Chunta

Ichhu Rutuna (Quechua ichhu Peruvian feather grass (stipa ichu), rutuna sickle, "ichhu sickle", also spelled Ichurutuna) is a mountain in the Chunta mountain range in the Andes of Peru, about 5,000 metres (16,404 ft) high. It is located in the Huancavelica Region, Castrovirreyna Province, on the border of the districts of Chupamarca and Aurahuá. Ichhu Rutuna lies north of Wallu Q'asa, northeast of Wichinka Lake and east of Qarwa Q'asa.
