= Q'ara Wayuna =

Mountain in Peru

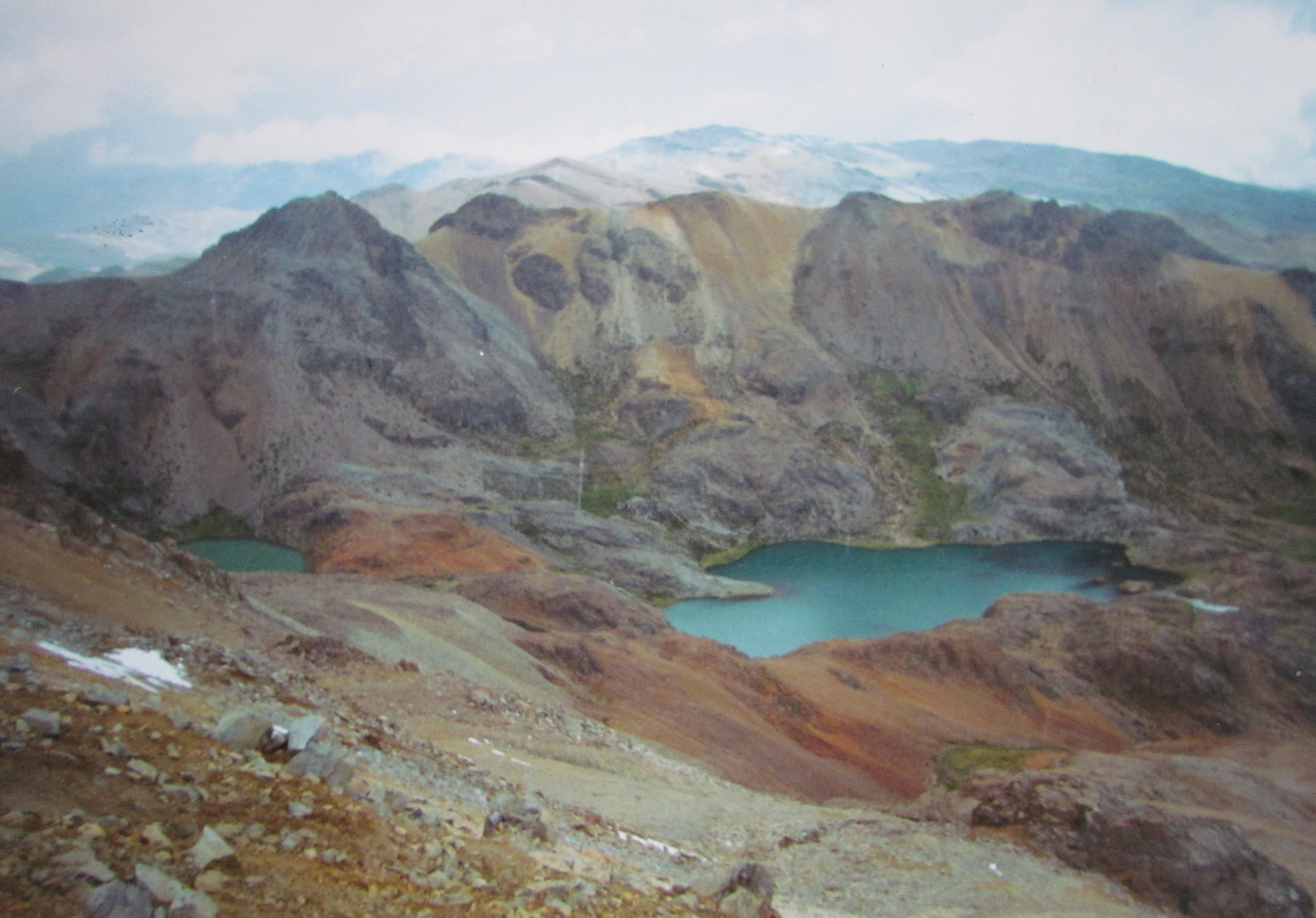
- The western extensions of the Chunta mountain range as seen from Sukullu (looking to the south). Q'ara Wayuna lies in the background

Highest point
- Elevation: 4,800 m (15,700 ft)
- Coordinates: 13°01′47″S 75°22′30″W

Geography
- Location within Peru
- Location: Peru, Huancavelica Region
- Parent range: Andes, Chunta

Q'ara Wayuna (Quechua q'ara bare, naked, wayuna basket, "bare basket", Hispanicized spelling Jarahuayuna) is a mountain in the Chunta mountain range in the Andes of Peru, about 4,800 m (15,700 ft) high. It is located in the Huancavelica Region, Castrovirreyna Province, on the border of the districts of Aurahuá and Castrovirreyna. It lies southwest of Sukullu and a lake named Antaqucha ("copper lake", Hispanicized Antacocha).
