= Pata Pata (Peru) =

Mountain in Peru

- Location within Peru

Highest point
- Elevation: 5,052 m (16,575 ft)
- Coordinates: 12°52′45″S 75°15′01″W

Geography
- Location: Peru, Huancavelica Region
- Parent range: Andes, Chunta

Pata Pata (Aymara and Quechua) is a 5,052-metre-high (16,575 ft) mountain in the Chunta mountain range in the Andes of Peru. It is located in the Huancavelica Region, Castrovirreyna Province, Castrovirreyna District, and in the Huancavelica Province, Ascensión District. Pata Pata lies southwest of Pinqullu and Hatun Pata. The river Kachimayu originates southeast of the mountain. It flows to the northeast as a tributary of Ichhu River.
