= Yana Urqu (Castrovirreyna) =

Mountain in Peru

- Location within Peru

Highest point
- Elevation: 5,000 m (16,000 ft)
- Coordinates: 13°06′58″S 75°02′30″W

Geography
- Location: Peru, Huancavelica Region
- Parent range: Andes, Chunta

Yana Urqu (Quechua yana black, urqu mountain, "black mountain", Hispanicized spelling Yana Orjo) is a mountain in the Chunta mountain range in the Andes of Peru, about 5,000 metres (16,404 ft) high. It is located in the Huancavelica Region, Castrovirreyna Province, Santa Ana District. Yana Urqu lies south of Wayra Q'asa.
