= Anqasqucha =

Anqasqucha (Quechua anqas blue, qucha lake, "blue lake", Hispanicized spellings Ancasccocha, Ancascocha, Anccasccocha, Angascocha, Angasjocha, also Anqasqocha) may refer to:

- Anqasqucha (Acobambilla), a mountain in the Acobambilla District, Huancavelica Province, Huancavelica Region, Peru
- Anqasqucha (Ayacucho), a lake in the Ayacucho Region, Peru
- Anqasqucha (Huancavelica), a lake in the Acobambilla District, Huancavelica Province, Huancavelica Region, Peru
