= Ch'aqra Punta =

Mountain in Peru

- Location within Peru

Highest point
- Elevation: 5,000 m (16,000 ft)
- Coordinates: 13°03′42″S 75°01′59″W

Geography
- Location: Peru, Huancavelica Region
- Parent range: Andes, Chunta

Ch'aqra Punta (Quechua ch'aqra ford, punta peak; ridge; first, before, in front of, also spelled Chajrapunta) or Chakra Punta (Quechua chakra field) is a mountain in the Chunta mountain range in the Andes of Peru, about 5,000 metres (16,404 ft) high. It is situated in the Huancavelica Region, Castrovirreyna Province, Santa Ana District, and in the Huancavelica Province, Huacocolpa District. Ch'aqra Punta lies southwest of K'allapayuq and northeast of Wayra Q'asa.
