= Kachi Mach'ay Urqu =

Mountain in Peru

- Location within Peru

Highest point
- Elevation: 5,000 m (16,000 ft)
- Coordinates: 12°56′40″S 75°09′00″W

Geography
- Location: Peru, Huancavelica Region
- Parent range: Andes, Chunta

Kachi Mach'ay Urqu (Quechua kachi salt, mach'ay cave, urqu mountain, "salt cave mountain", hispanicized spelling Cachimachay Orjo) is a mountain in the Chunta mountain range in the Andes of Peru, about 5,000 m (16,000 ft) high. It is located in the Huancavelica Region, Huancavelica Province, Huancavelica District. Kachi Mach'ay Urqu lies west of Antarasu and northeast of Wachu Intiyuq.
