= Pinqullu (Huancavelica) =

Mountain in Peru

- Location within Peru

Highest point
- Elevation: 4,800 m (15,700 ft)
- Coordinates: 12°54′09″S 75°04′59″W

Geography
- Location: Peru, Huancavelica Region
- Parent range: Andes, Chunta

Pinqullu (Aymara for a kind of flute of the Andes, Hispanicized spelling Pencoyllo) is a mountain in the Chunta mountain range in the Andes of Peru, about 4,800 metres (15,748 ft) high. It lies in the Huancavelica Region, Huancavelica Province, Huancavelica District. Pinqullu is situated northwest of Kuntur Wamani and Wamanrasu.
