= Hatun Pata =

Mountain in Peru

- Location within Peru

Highest point
- Elevation: 5,182 m (17,001 ft)
- Coordinates: 12°51′30″S 75°12′53″W

Geography
- Location: Peru, Huancavelica Region
- Parent range: Andes, Chunta

Hatun Pata (Quechua hatun big (in Bolivia always jatun), pata elevated place; above, at the top; edge; bank (of a river), shore, "big elevated place", also spelled Jatun Pata) is a 5,182-metre (17,001 ft) mountain in the Chunta mountain range in the Andes of Peru. It is located in the Huancavelica Region, Huancavelica Province, Ascensión District. Hatun Pata lies northwest of Pinqullu and northeast of Pata Pata. The river Kachimayu originates south of the mountain. It flows to the northeast as a tributary of Ichhu River.
