= Ccarhuarazo (Huancavelica) =

Mountain in Peru

- Location within Peru

Highest point
- Elevation: 5,169 m (16,959 ft)
- Coordinates: 12°57′49″S 75°02′14″W

Geography
- Location: Peru, Huancavelica Region
- Parent range: Andes, Chunta

Ccarhuarazo or Qarwarasu (Quechua, qarwa leaf worm; larva of a beetle; pale, yellowish, golden, Ancash Quechua rasu snow, ice, mountain with snow, Hispanicized spelling Ccarhuarazo) is a 5,169-metre-high (16,959 ft) mountain in the Chunta mountain range in the Andes of Peru. It is located in the Huancavelica Region, Castrovirreyna Province, Santa Ana District, and in the Huancavelica Province, Huancavelica District. Ccarhuarazo is situated southeast of Kuntur Wamani and Wamanrasu. Its highest peak is on the border of the provinces. Two other peaks which reach 5,062 metres (16,608 ft) and more than 5,000 metres (16,404 ft) lie to the northeast in the Huancavelica District.
