= Wamanripayuq (Huancavelica) =

Mountain in Peru

- Location within Peru

Highest point
- Elevation: 5,000 m (16,000 ft)
- Coordinates: 12°59′37″S 75°10′45″W

Geography
- Location: Peru, Huancavelica Region
- Parent range: Andes, Chunta

Wamanripayuq (Quechua wamanripa Senecio, -yuq a suffix, "the one with the wamanripa", also spelled Huamanripayoc) is a mountain in the Chunta mountain range in the Andes of Peru, about 5,000 m (16,000 ft) high. It located in the Huancavelica Region, Castrovirreyna Province, on the border of the districts of Castrovirreyna and Santa Ana.
