= Yawar Q'asa =

Mountain in Peru

- Location within Peru

Highest point
- Elevation: 5,000 m (16,000 ft)
- Coordinates: 12°59′40″S 75°08′47″W

Geography
- Location: Peru, Huancavelica Region
- Parent range: Andes, Chunta

Yawar Q'asa (Quechua yawar blood, q'asa mountain pass, "blood pass", Hispanicized spelling Yahuarjasa) is a mountain in the Chunta mountain range in the Andes of Peru, about 5,000 metres (16,404 ft) high. It is located in the Huancavelica Region, Castrovirreyna Province, on the border of the districts of Castrovirreyna and Santa Ana. Yawar Q'asa lies southwest of Antarasu.
