= Waqutuyuq =

Mountain in Peru

- Location within Peru

Highest point
- Elevation: 4,800 m (15,700 ft)
- Coordinates: 12°54′17″S 75°08′05″W

Geography
- Location: Peru, Huancavelica Region
- Parent range: Andes, Chunta

Waqutuyuq (Quechua waqutu a variety of potatoes, -yuq a suffix to indicate ownership, "the one with the waqutu", also spelled Huajotuyo) is a mountain in the Chunta mountain range in the Andes of Peru, about 4,800 metres (15,748 ft) high. It is located in the Huancavelica Region, Huancavelica Province, Huancavelica District, north of Antarasu. Waqutuyuq lies at a valley named Qarwa Q'asa ("yellowish valley", also spelled Carhuajasa). The waters of its intermittent stream flow to Kachimayu in the north.
