= Chapi Urqu =

Mountain in Peru

- Location within Peru

Highest point
- Elevation: 4,800 m (15,700 ft)
- Coordinates: 13°04′30″S 74°57′38″W

Geography
- Location: Peru, Huancavelica Region, Huancavelica Province
- Parent range: Andes

Chapi Urqu (Quechua chapi tin, urqu mountain, "tin mountain", Hispanicized spelling Chapeorcco) is a mountain in the Andes of Peru, about 4,800 m (15,700 ft) high. It is located in the Huancavelica Region, Huancavelica Province, Huacocolpa District. Chapi Urqu lies northeast of Inqhana and Yana Urqu.
