= Puka Q'asa (Huancavelica) =

Mountain in Peru

- Location within Peru

Highest point
- Elevation: 4,800 m (15,700 ft)
- Coordinates: 12°47′41″S 75°10′46″W

Geography
- Location: Peru, Huancavelica Region
- Parent range: Andes, Chunta

Puka Q'asa (Quechua puka red, q'asa mountain pass, "red mountain pass," Hispanicized spelling Pucajasa) is a mountain in the Chunta mountain range in the Andes of Peru, about 4,800 m (15,748 ft) high. It is situated in the Huancavelica Region, Huancavelica Province, Nuevo Occoro District. Puka Q'asa lies northeast of Q'iru Pinqullu and Winchu Q'asa, and east of Tipiqucha.
