= Sukullu =

Mountain in Peru

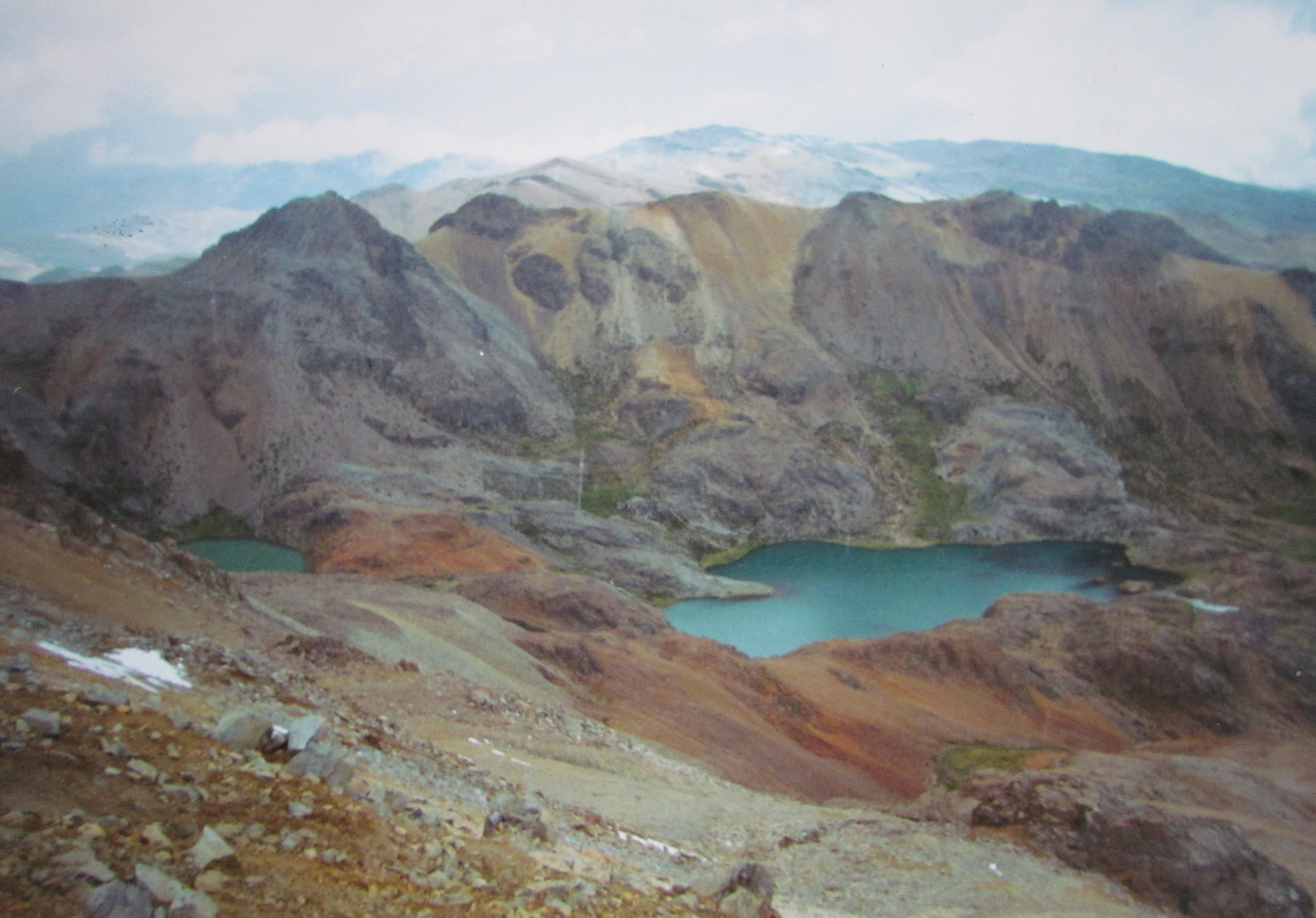
- The western extensions of the Chunta mountain range as seen from Sukullu (looking to the south)

Highest point
- Elevation: 5,095 m (16,716 ft)
- Coordinates: 12°59′10″S 75°21′41″W

Geography
- Location within Peru
- Location: Peru, Huancavelica Region
- Parent range: Andes, Chunta

Sukullu (Aymara for a baby boy for whom a certain traditional rite was celebrated in the main square together with the other children who were born in the same year, Hispanicized spelling Sucullo) is a 5,095-metre-high (16,716 ft) mountain in the Chunta mountain range in the Andes of Peru. It is located in the Huancavelica Region, Castrovirreyna Province, on the border of the districts of Aurahuá and Castrovirreyna.
