= Yarq'asqa =

Mountain in Peru

- Location within Peru

Highest point
- Elevation: 5,000 m (16,000 ft)
- Coordinates: 12°49′27″S 75°15′02″W

Geography
- Location: Peru, Huancavelica Region
- Parent range: Andes, Chunta

Yarq'asqa (Quechua yarq'a artificial canal, -sqa a suffix, "canalized", Hispanicized spelling Yarjasca) is a mountain in the Chunta mountain range in the Andes of Peru, about 5,000 m (16,000 ft) high. It is located in the Huancavelica Region, Huancavelica Province, Ascensión District. Yarq'asqa lies southwest of Sitaq.
