= Winchu Q'asa =

Mountain in Peru

- Location within Peru

Highest point
- Elevation: 5,000 m (16,000 ft)
- Coordinates: 12°48′36″S 75°11′14″W

Geography
- Location: Peru, Huancavelica Region
- Parent range: Andes, Chunta

Winchu Q'asa (Quechua winchu magnetite, q'asa mountain pass, "magnetite pass", Hispanicized spelling Huinchujasa) is a mountain in the Chunta in the Andes of Peru, about 5,000 m (16,404 ft) high. It is situated in the Huancavelica Region, Huancavelica Province, Nuevo Occoro District. Winchu Q'asa lies southwest of Puka Q'asa, southeast of Tipiqucha and northeast of Q'iru Pinqullu.
