= Jorge Marticorena Cuba =

Peruvian politician (1956–2021)

District Mayor of Lurín
- In office 1 January 2019 – 1 March 2021
- Preceded by: José Arakaki Nakamine
- Succeeded by: Francisco Julca Mideyros
- In office 1 January 2007 – 31 December 2014
- Preceded by: José Luis Ayllón Mini
- Succeeded by: José Arakaki Nakamine

District Councillor of Lurín
- In office 1 January 1990 – 28 March 1993

Personal details
- Born: Jorge Juan Marticorena Cuba; 9 November 1956; Tantara District, Peru
- Died: 1 March 2021 (aged 64)
- Political party: APRA; PDSP

Jorge Marticorena Cuba (9 November 1956 – 1 March 2021) was a Peruvian politician. He was District Mayor of Lurín, serving from 2007 to 2014 and again from 2019 until his death in 2021.

== Biography ==
Cuba was born in the Tantara District to Jorge Marticorena Salvatierra and Sebastiana Cuba Violeta. He attended the Alfonso Ugarte School in Lima for his primary and secondary studies, and Inca Garcilaso de la Vega University for his accounting degree.

Cuba stood in the 1989 Lima municipal elections as a member of the Peruvian Aprista Party, which would later merge into the American Popular Revolutionary Alliance. He was elected to be a Municipal Councillor for the Lurín district from 1990 to 1993. He ran for Mayor of the district in 2002, but was defeated by José Luis Ayllón Mini. However, he redeemed himself in 2006, winning the seat. He was reelected in the 2010 elections but lost to José Arakaki Nakamine in the 2014 elections. For the 2018 elections, he switched to the party We Are Peru and once again won the seat of District Mayor of Lurín.

Jorge Marticorena contracted COVID-19 during the COVID-19 pandemic in Peru in February 2021. He died on 1 March 2021 at the age of 64, becoming the third district mayor in the Lima metropolitan area to die of the disease, following Luis Chauca Navarro and Claudio Marcatoma Ccahuana.
