= Qiwllaqucha (Huancavelica) =

Lake in Huancavelica, Peru

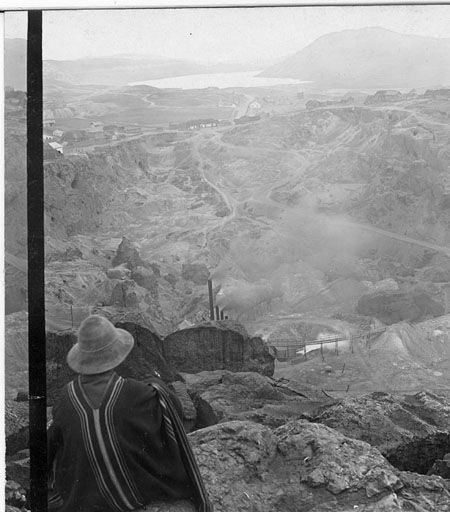

- Location within Peru
- Location: Peru; Huancavelica Region
- Coordinates: 12°51′30″S 74°59′20″W

Qiwllaqucha (Quechua qillwa, qiwlla, qiwiña gull, qucha lake, "gull lake", Hispanicized spelling Jeullacocha) is a lake in the Huancavelica Region in Peru. It is located in the Huancavelica Province, Huancavelica District, south of Huancavelica.
