= Kuntur Wamani =

Mountain in Peru

- Location within Peru

Highest point
- Elevation: 4,800 m (15,700 ft)
- Coordinates: 12°55′04″S 75°03′58″W

Geography
- Location: Peru, Huancavelica Region
- Parent range: Andes, Chunta

Kuntur Wamani (Quechua kuntur condor, wamani sternum; xiphoid process; god of the Ch'anka mythology; provinces of the Inca Empire, Hispanicized spellings Condor Huamani, Condor Huamaní) is a mountain in the Chunta mountain range in the Andes of Peru, about 4,800 metres (15,748 ft) high. It is located in the Huancavelica Region, Castrovirreyna Province, Santa Ana District, and in the Huancavelica Province, Huancavelica District. Kuntur Wamani lies southeast of Wamanrasu, northwest of Qarwarasu and northeast of Antarasu.
