= Qarwa Q'asa =

Mountain in Peru

- Location within Peru

Highest point
- Elevation: 5,005 m (16,421 ft)
- Coordinates: 12°51′08″S 75°26′06″W

Geography
- Location: Peru, Huancavelica Region
- Parent range: Andes, Chunta

Qarwa Q'asa (Quechua qarwa pale, yellowish, golden, q'asa mountain pass, "yellowish pass", Hispanicized spelling Carhuajasa) is a 5,005-metre-high (16,421 ft) mountain in the Chunta mountain range in the Andes of Peru. It is located in the Huancavelica Region, Castrovirreyna Province, on the border of the districts of Chupamarca and Aurahuá. Qarwa Q'asa lies west of Ichhu Rutuna, northwest of Wallu Q'asa and Phiruru Urqu and northeast of Wichinka Lake.
