= Qarwa Urqu (Huancavelica) =

Mountain in Peru

- Location within Peru

Highest point
- Elevation: 4,600 m (15,100 ft)
- Coordinates: 12°54′15″S 75°10′06″W

Geography
- Location: Peru, Huancavelica Region
- Parent range: Andes, Chunta

Qarwa Urqu (Quechua qarwa pale, yellowish, golden, urqu mountain, "yellowish mountain", Hispanicized spelling Jarhua Orjo) is a mountain in the Chunta mountain range in the Andes of Peru, about 4,600 metres (15,092 ft) high. It lies in the Huancavelica Region, Huancavelica Province, Huancavelica District, northwest of Antarasu.
