= Moisés Tambini del Valle =

Peruvian lawyer, judge and politician (born 1934)

Member of the National Political Commission of the Peruvian Aprista Party
- In office 10 December 2020 – 18 October 2026
- President: César Trelles

Ambassador of Peru to Costa Rica
- In office 15 April 2009 – June 2011
- Preceded by: Luis Wilfredo Sándiga Cabrera
- Succeeded by: Fernando Rojas Samanez

President of the State Judicial Defense Council
- In office 2006–2008
- President: Alan García

Member of the Chamber of Deputies
- In office 26 July 1985 – 26 July 1990
- Constituency: Junín

Personal details
- Born: Moisés Tambini del Valle; 25 November 1934 (age 91) Pilchaca, Huancavelica, Peru
- Party: Peruvian Aprista Party (1956–present)
- Education: National University of Trujillo; National University of San Marcos; University of San Martín de Porres
- Occupation: Lawyer, notary, judge, academic

Moisés Tambini del Valle (born 25 November 1934) is a Peruvian lawyer, notary, former judge and politician. A member of the Peruvian Aprista Party (APRA) since 1956, he served as a member of the Chamber of Deputies for Junín from 1985 to 1990, as president of the State Judicial Defense Council during the second government of Alan García, and as Peru's ambassador to Costa Rica from 2009 to 2011. He has served as a defense attorney for Alan García.

== Early life and education ==
Tambini was born on 25 November 1934 in the Pilchaca District, in the Peruvian region of Huancavelica, the son of Cornelio Tambini Casmac and Rosalía del Valle Tambini.

He studied law at the National University of Trujillo, where he qualified as a lawyer. He later earned a postgraduate qualification in human rights from the Complutense University of Madrid, a master's degree in criminal law from the University of San Martín de Porres, a postgraduate qualification in criminal law from the University of Salamanca, and a doctorate in law and political science from the National University of San Marcos. He also completed a master's degree in governance at the University of San Martín de Porres and a doctorate in constitutional law at the Universidad Escuela Libre de Derecho in Costa Rica.

== Legal and judicial career ==
Tambini is a practising lawyer and the founder of the law firm Estudio Tambini Abogados.

In 1974 he was elected dean of the Bar Association of Junín (Colegio de Abogados de Junín). The following year he became a judge (vocal) of the Superior Court of Justice of Junín, and he later served as a permanent judge of the Superior Court of Justice of Lima.

He has taught at the University of San Martín de Porres, where he has been a principal professor and director general of its postgraduate section.

== Political career ==
Tambini joined the Peruvian Aprista Party, founded by Víctor Raúl Haya de la Torre, in 1956. In the 1985 general election he was elected to the Chamber of Deputies for the Junín constituency on the APRA list, serving for the 1985–1990 term. As a deputy, he chaired the Human Rights Committee (1987–1988) and the Justice Committee (1989–1990).

After leaving Congress in 1990, he represented Peru at the United Nations Commission on Human Rights in Geneva.

=== García government (2006–2011) ===
From 2006 to 2008, during Alan García's second term, Tambini served as the state's chief litigation officer, presiding over the State Judicial Defense Council (Consejo de Defensa Judicial del Estado), the body that oversaw the government's public attorneys (procuradores). In February 2009 he was appointed Peru's ambassador to Costa Rica, a post he held until June 2011.

=== 2026 Senate candidacy ===
For the 2026 Peruvian general election, the first to elect a restored Senate, APRA's national leadership designated Tambini as a candidate on the party's Senate list. A party member who had been left off the list challenged its composition before the electoral authorities, arguing among other things that Tambini had placed only 20th in the party's internal vote. Tambini, then aged 91, campaigned on criticism of the state of Congress, the Public Prosecutor's Office and the justice system. APRA failed to pass the electoral threshold in the April 2026 election and won no seats in either chamber.

== Controversies ==
In February 2017 the news site Útero.pe published photographs showing Tambini together with Julia Príncipe, a former state anti-money-laundering prosecutor whose office had been involved in investigations connected to the Lava Jato case, which reached several former Peruvian presidents, including García. It was also reported that a granddaughter of Tambini had been hired at the anti-money-laundering prosecutor's office under Príncipe. Tambini responded publicly, defending his relationship with Príncipe and stating that she should be protected.

== Selected works ==
- El derecho procesal penal peruano (1980)
- La Constitución de 1979 (1981)
- Los derechos humanos en el Perú (1987)
- La prueba en el derecho procesal penal (1996)
- El derecho procesal penal y los procedimientos especiales (1997)
- La prueba en el derecho penal (2000)
- El proceso penal ordinario y las pruebas en el derecho penal (2003)
- La inobservancia del debido proceso en el derecho penal peruano (2005)
- Fundamentos del nuevo proceso penal peruano (2008)

== Honours ==
- Honorary member of the Bar Association of Guayas, Guayaquil, Ecuador (1996)
- Mother Teresa of Calcutta Medal, awarded by the civil association Sembrando Valores, Lima (21 May 2008)
- Full member of the Inter-American Academy of International and Comparative Law, inducted in San José, Costa Rica (14 October 2010)
- Vicente Morales Duárez Medal, Lima Bar Association (24 November 2010)
- Grand Cross of the National Order of Juan Mora Fernández, Costa Rica (21 July 2011)
