= Puka Punta (disambiguation) =

Puka Punta (Quechua: puka red, punta peak, ridge, "red peak (or ridge), also spelled Puca Punta, Pucapunta) may refer to:

- Puka Punta, a mountain in the Cusco Region, Peru
- Puka Punta (Ancash), a mountain in the Ancash Region, Peru
- Puka Punta (Huancavelica), a mountain in the Huancavelica Region, Peru
