= Palca District =

Palca District may refer to several districts in Peru:

- Palca District, Huancavelica
- Palca District, Lampa
- Palca District, Tacna
- Palca District, Tarma
