= Yana Urqu (Chapi Urqu) =

Mountain in Peru

- Location within Peru

Highest point
- Elevation: 4,890 m (16,040 ft)
- Coordinates: 13°05′07″S 74°58′41″W

Geography
- Location: Peru, Huancavelica Region, Huancavelica Province
- Parent range: Andes

Yana Urqu (Quechua yana black, urqu mountain, "black mountain", Hispanicized spelling Yanaorcco) is a 4,890-metre-high (16,040 ft) mountain in the Andes of Peru. It is located in the Huancavelica Region, Huancavelica Province, Huacocolpa District. Yana Urqu lies southeast of Chapi Urqu and northeast of Inqhana.
