= Yauli District, Huancavelica =

Coordinates: 12.7707°S 74.8491°W

Yauli Yawlli
- District
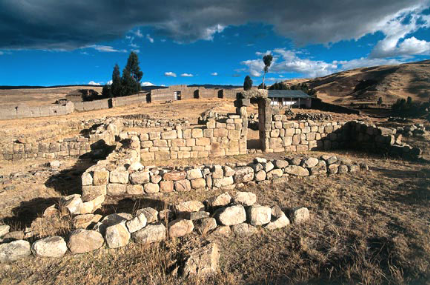
- The archaeological site Uchkus Inkañan in the Yauli District
- Interactive map of Yauli
- Country: Peru
- Region: Huancavelica
- Province: Huancavelica
- Founded: June 23, 1962
- Capital: Yauli

Government
  - Mayor: Edwin Taipe Condori

Area
  - Total: 319.92 km^{2} (123.52 sq mi)
- Elevation: 3,391 m (11,125 ft)

Population (2005 census)
  - Total: 25,113
  - Density: 78.498/km^{2} (203.31/sq mi)
- Time zone: UTC-5 (PET)
- UBIGEO: 090117

Yauli District is one of nineteen districts of the province Huancavelica in Peru.

The capital of the district is the town of Yauli.

== Ethnic groups ==
The people in the district are mainly indigenous citizens of Quechua descent. Quechua is the language which the majority of the population (88.36%) learnt to speak in childhood, 11.42% of the residents started speaking using the Spanish language (2007 Peru Census).

== Places of interest ==
The archaeological site Uchkus Inkañan is situated in the district.
