= Ascensión District =

Coordinates: 12.7840°S 74.9782°W

Ascensión
- District
- Interactive map of Ascensión
- Country: Peru
- Region: Huancavelica
- Province: Huancavelica
- Founded: June 8, 2000
- Capital: Ascención

Government
  - Mayor: Marcos Mariano Paytan Cuba

Area
  - Total: 432.24 km^{2} (166.89 sq mi)
- Elevation: 3,650 m (11,980 ft)

Population (2005 census)
  - Total: 9,897
  - Density: 22.90/km^{2} (59.30/sq mi)
- Time zone: UTC-5 (PET)
- UBIGEO: 090118

Ascensión District is one of nineteen districts of the province Huancavelica in Peru.

== Geography ==
The Chunta mountain range traverses the district. Some of the highest peaks of the district are listed below:

- Añas Q'asa
- Hatun Pata
- Kawra Wasi
- Kuntur Qaqa
- Pata Pata
- Pinqullu
- Puka Pata
- Qullpa Muqu
- Qusqu
- Wamani Punta
- Wari
- Wayta Urqu
- Yarq'asqa
- Yawar Pukyu

== Climate ==
Climate data for Huancavelica, Ascensión, elevation 3,717 m (12,195 ft), (1991–2020)
Month	Jan	Feb	Mar	Apr	May	Jun	Jul	Aug	Sep	Oct	Nov	Dec	Year
Mean daily maximum °C (°F)	16.4 (61.5)	15.9 (60.6)	15.7 (60.3)	15.8 (60.4)	16.6 (61.9)	16.7 (62.1)	16.7 (62.1)	17.4 (63.3)	17.2 (63.0)	17.6 (63.7)	19.0 (66.2)	16.9 (62.4)	16.8 (62.3)
Mean daily minimum °C (°F)	3.8 (38.8)	3.8 (38.8)	3.7 (38.7)	2.6 (36.7)	0.7 (33.3)	−0.2 (31.6)	−0.1 (31.8)	0.6 (33.1)	2.3 (36.1)	3.0 (37.4)	3.4 (38.1)	3.7 (38.7)	2.3 (36.1)
Average precipitation mm (inches)	153.7 (6.05)	166.6 (6.56)	155.8 (6.13)	70.7 (2.78)	21.1 (0.83)	10.7 (0.42)	16.7 (0.66)	25.6 (1.01)	50.5 (1.99)	72.3 (2.85)	71.9 (2.83)	131.2 (5.17)	946.8 (37.28)
Source: National Meteorology and Hydrology Service of Peru

== See also ==
- Kachimayu
