= Huancavelica District =

Coordinates: 12.7873°S 74.9731°W

Huancavelica Wankawillka
- District
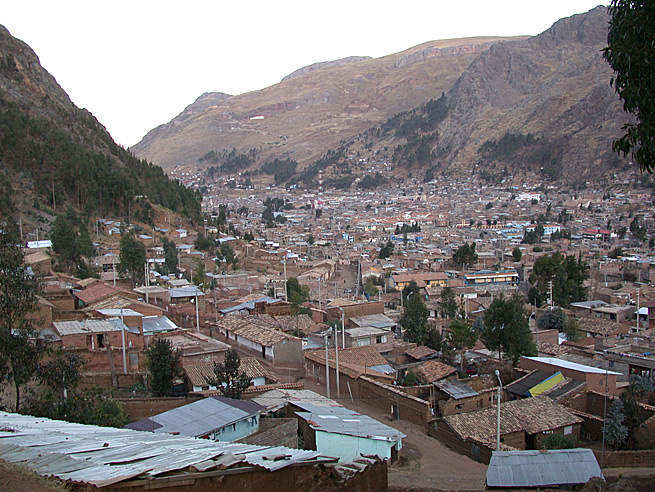
- Huancavelica

- Flag Coat of arms
- Interactive map of Huancavelica
- Country: Peru
- Region: Huancavelica
- Province: Huancavelica
- Capital: Huancavelica

Government
  - Mayor: Rómulo Cayllahua Paytán (2019–2022)

Area
  - Total: 514.1 km^{2} (198.5 sq mi)
- Elevation: 3,660 m (12,010 ft)

Population (2017)
  - Total: 39,776
  - Density: 77.37/km^{2} (200.4/sq mi)
- Time zone: UTC-5 (PET)
- UBIGEO: 090101

Huancavelica District is one of nineteen districts of the province Huancavelica in Peru.

== Geography ==
The Chunta mountain range traverses the district. Some of the highest mountains of the district are listed below:

- Hatun Pirwayuq
- Hatun Q'asa
- Huch'uy Pirwayuq
- Kachi Mach'ay Urqu
- Kuntur Wamani
- Pinqullu
- Puka Q'asa
- Puka Urqu
- Puywan
- Qarwa K'anti
- Qarwa Urqu
- Qarwarasu
- Qucha Q'asa
- Tiklla Q'asa
- Ukhu P'ukru
- Wachu Intiyuq
- Wamanrasu
- Waqutuyuq
- Wayq'u Kancha
- Yana Kancha

== See also ==
- Administrative divisions of Peru
- Kachimayu
- Qiwllaqucha
