= Huch'uy Anqas =

Mountain in Peru

- Location within Peru

Highest point
- Elevation: 5,182 m (17,001 ft)
- Coordinates: 12°39′15″S 75°24′40″W

Geography
- Location: Peru, Huancavelica Region
- Parent range: Andes, Chunta

Huch'uy Anqas (Quechua huch'uy 'little', anqas 'blue', Hispanicized spelling Uchiangas, Uchuiangas) is a 5,182-metre-high (17,001 ft) mountain in the Chunta mountain range in the Andes of Peru.

== Location ==
It is situated in the Huancavelica Region, Huancavelica Province, Acobambilla District. Huch'uy Anqas lies south of Anqasqucha and east of the lake named Anqasqucha (Quechua for 'blue lake') and north of Chiliqucha.
