= Yana Urqu (Huancavelica) =

Mountain in Peru

- Location within Peru

Highest point
- Elevation: 5,000 m (16,000 ft)
- Coordinates: 13°04′26″S 75°00′41″W

Geography
- Location: Peru, Huancavelica Region, Huancavelica Province
- Parent range: Andes, Chunta

Yana Urqu (Quechua yana black, urqu mountain, "black mountain", hispanicized spelling Yana Orjo) is a mountain in the Chunta mountain range in the Andes of Peru, about 5,000 metres (16,404 ft) high. It is located in the Huancavelica Region, Huancavelica Province, Huacocolpa District. Yana Urqu lies northwest of Inqhana and northeast of Wayra Q'asa.
