= Yuraq Mach'ay (Huancavelica) =

Mountain in Peru

- Location within Peru

Highest point
- Elevation: 4,800 m (15,700 ft)
- Coordinates: 13°03′39″S 75°00′21″W

Geography
- Location: Peru, Huancavelica Region, Huancavelica Province
- Parent range: Andes, Chunta

Yuraq Mach'ay (Quechua yuraq white, mach'ay cave, "white cave", Hispanicized spelling Yurac Machay) is a mountain in the Chunta mountain range in the Andes of Peru, about 4,800 m (15,700 ft) high. It is located in the Huancavelica Region, Huancavelica Province, Huacocolpa District. Yuraq Mach'ay lies north of Yana Urqu.
