= Puka Punta (Huancavelica) =

Mountain in Peru

- Location within Peru

Highest point
- Elevation: 5,136 m (16,850 ft)
- Coordinates: 13°00′41″S 75°01′52″W

Geography
- Location: Peru, Huancavelica Region
- Parent range: Andes, Chunta

Puka Punta (Quechua puka red, punta peak; ridge, "red peak (or ridge)", also spelled Pucapunta) is a 5,136-metre-high (16,850 ft) mountain in the Chunta mountain range in the Andes of Peru. It is situated in the Huancavelica Region, Castrovirreyna Province, Santa Ana District, and in the Huancavelica Province, Huacocolpa District. Puka Punta lies northwest of K'allapayuq.
