= Qusqu (Huancavelica) =

Mountain in Peru

- Location within Peru

Highest point
- Elevation: 5,000 m (16,000 ft)
- Coordinates: 12°54′52″S 75°17′41″W

Geography
- Location: Peru, Huancavelica Region
- Parent range: Andes, Chunta

Qusqu (Quechua for boundary stone; nucleus; navel; heap of earth and stones; bed, dry bed of a lake, Hispanicized spelling Josjo) is a mountain in the Chunta mountain range in the Andes of Peru, about 5,000 m (16,000 ft) high. It is located in the Huancavelica Region, Castrovirreyna Province, Castrovirreyna District, and in the Huancavelica Province, Ascensión District.

The little lake northeast of Qusqu is named Yawriqucha ("needle lake", Hispanicized Yauricocha). This is where the Yawriqucha River originates. Its waters flow to the Mantaro River in the northeast.
