= Puka Rumi =

Mountain in Peru

- Location within Peru

Highest point
- Elevation: 5,000 m (16,000 ft)
- Coordinates: 12°37′28″S 75°26′02″W

Geography
- Location: Peru, Huancavelica Region, Junín Region
- Parent range: Andes, Chunta

Puka Rumi (Quechua puka red, rumi stone, "red stone", Hispanicized spelling Pucarumi) is a 5,000-metre-high (16,404 ft) mountain in the northern part of the Chunta mountain range in the Andes of Peru. It is situated in the Huancavelica Region, Huancavelica Province, Acobambilla District, and in the Junín Region, Huancayo Province, Chongos Alto District. Puka Rumi lies southeast of Ñawinqucha.
