= Cuenca District, Huancavelica =

Coordinates: 12°25′51″S 75°02′11″W

Cuenca District
- District
- Interactive map of Cuenca District
- Country: Peru
- Region: Huancavelica
- Province: Huancavelica
- Founded: August 17, 1920
- Capital: Cuenca

Government
  - Mayor: Hugo Barra Huarocc

Area
  - Total: 50.25 km^{2} (19.40 sq mi)
- Elevation: 3,167 m (10,390 ft)

Population (2005 census)
  - Total: 2,669
  - Density: 53.11/km^{2} (137.6/sq mi)
- Time zone: UTC-5 (PET)
- UBIGEO: 090105

Cuenca District is one of nineteen districts of the province Huancavelica in Peru.

== Ethnic groups ==
The people in the district are mainly Indigenous citizens of Quechua descent. Quechua is the language which the majority of the population (64.01%) learnt to speak in childhood, 35.65% of the residents started speaking using the Spanish language (2007 Peru Census).
