= Huancavelica =

- City
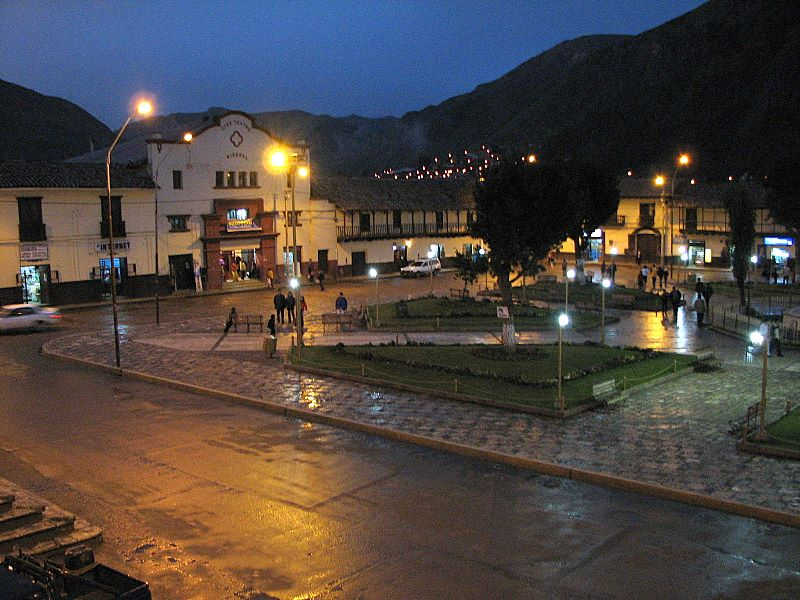
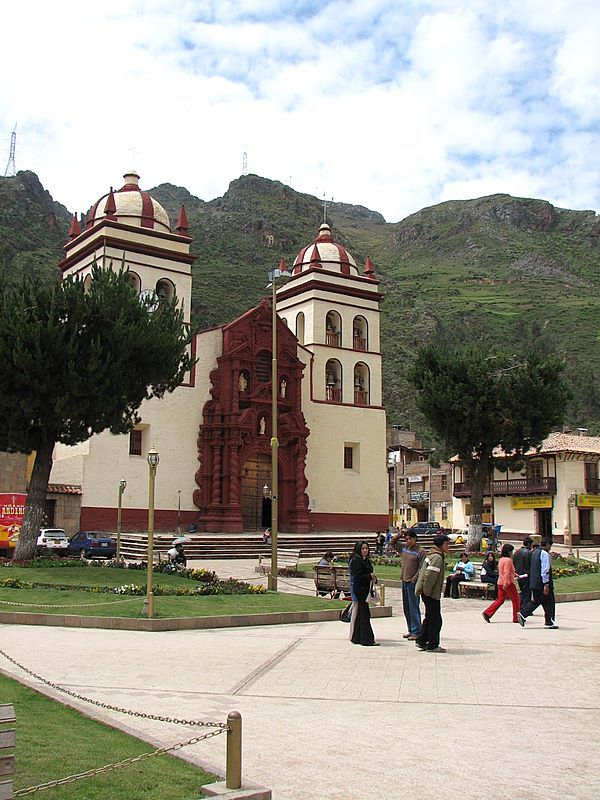
- Plaza de armas of Huancavelica at night, The cathedral of Huancavelica.

- Flag Seal
- Nickname: "Villa Rica de Oropesa"
- Location within Peru
- Coordinates: 12°47′11″S 74°58′32″W
- Country: Peru
- Region: Huancavelica
- Province: Huancavelica
- Founded: 5 August 1572
- Founder: Francisco de Toledo

Government
  - Mayor: Rómulo Cayllahua Paytán

Area
  - Total: 514.10 km^{2} (198.50 sq mi)
- Elevation: 3,676 m (12,060 ft)

Population (2017)
  - Total: 49,570
  - Estimate (2015): 47,866
  - Density: 96.42/km^{2} (249.7/sq mi)
- Demonym: Huancavelicano(a)
- Time zone: UTC-5 (PET)
  - Summer (DST): UTC-5 (PET)
- Postal code: 67
- Website: www.munihuancavelica.gob.pe

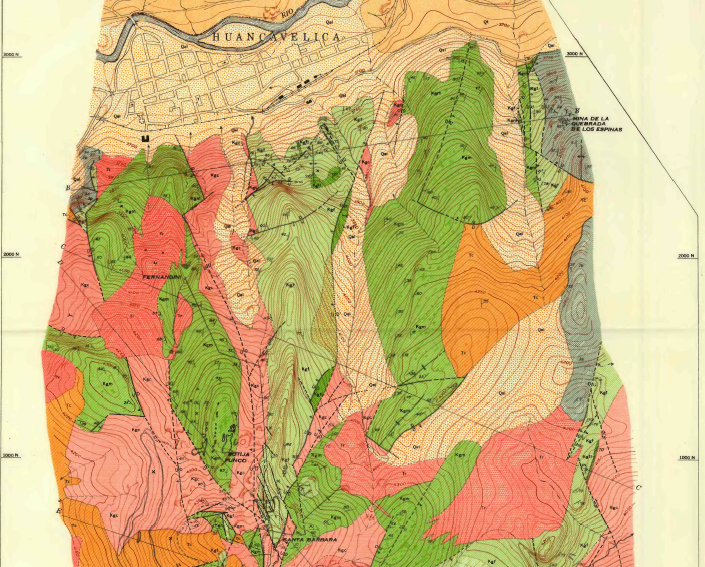
Huancavelica geological map. The Santa Barbara mine (Peru) is in the bottom center, south of the city. Dark green marks the location of the Machay limestone, while light green indicates the Gran Farallon sandstone.

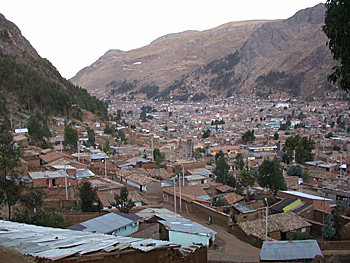
Aerial view of Huancavelica

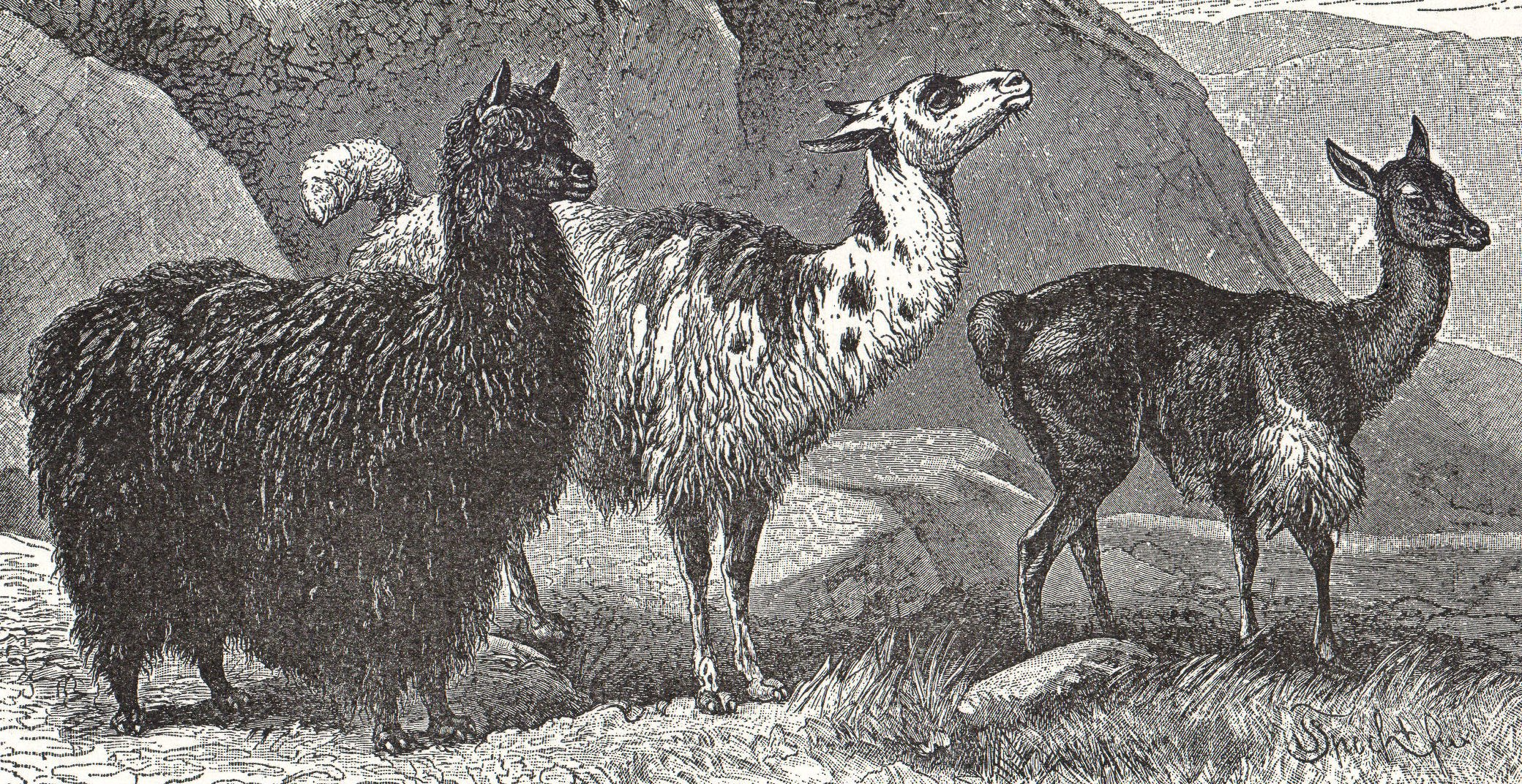
In the Neolithic period the ancient inhabitants of this city began to domesticate some camelids as alpaca and llama.

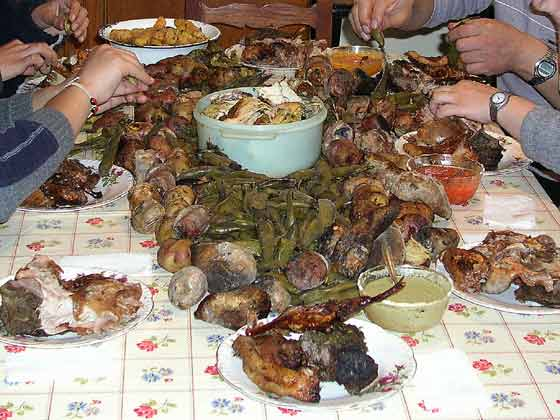
The Huancavelican pachamanca has products such as sheep, goat, pig, guinea pigs and beef and choclos, potatoes, beans, quesillos, cheese and humitas.

Huancavelica (Spanish pronunciation: [waŋkaβeˈlika]) or Wankawillka in Quechua is a city in Peru. It is the capital of the department of Huancavelica and according to the 2017 census had a population of 49,570 people. The city was established on August 5, 1572 by the Viceroy of Peru Francisco de Toledo. Indigenous peoples represent a major percentage of the population. It has an approximate altitude of 3,676 metres (12,060 ft); the climate is cold and dry between the months of February and August with a rainy season between September and January. It is considered one of the poorest cities in Peru.

== Geography ==
The Huancavelica area features a rough geography with highly varied elevation, from 1,950 metres (6,400 ft) in the valleys to more than 5,000 metres (16,000 ft) on its snow-covered summits. These mountains contain metallic deposits. They consist of the western chain of the Andes, which includes the Chunta mountain range, formed by a series of hills, the most prominent of which are: Sitaq (5,328 m; 17,480 ft), Wamanrasu (5,298 m; 17,382 ft) and Altar (5,268 m; 17,283 ft).

Among the rivers of the region there are the Mantaro, the Pampas, the Huarpa and the Churcampa. The Mantaro River penetrates Huancavelica, forming Tayacaja's Peninsula. Another river that shapes the relief is the Pampas River which is born in the lakes of the high mountains of Huancavelica, Chuqlluqucha and Urququcha.

=== Geology ===
The principal ore mineral is cinnabar, which occurs within the Cretaceous Gran Farallón sandstones, and fractures found in the Jurassic Pucara and Cretaceous Machay limestones and igneous rocks. Other sulfide minerals occurring with these deposits include pyrite, arsenopyrite and realgar.

Caving became top to bottom in 1806 in order to avoid several disasters in previous years. The most infamous one being the Marroquin caving in 1786, which took the lives of over two hundred Indians.

Most of the quicksilver was produced from 1571 until 1790, amounting to more than 1,400,000 flasks.

== History ==
At the time of Spanish conquest, Huancavelica was known as the Wankawillka region or "sacred stone". The city itself was established on August 5, 1572 by viceroy Francisco de Toledo. The community has expanded throughout the region.

The mercury deposits of Huancavelica were disclosed in 1564, or 1566, by the Indian Nahuincopa to his master Jerónimo Luis de Cabrera. The Spanish Crown appropriated them in 1570 and operated them until Peruvian independence in 1821. Considered the "greatest jewel in the crown", they eliminated the need to ship mercury from Almadén. A miners guild, Gremio de Mineros, administered the mines from 1577 until 1782. Production stopped from 1813 through 1835. In 1915 E.E. Fernandini took over ownership.

The area was the most prolific source of mercury in Spanish America, and as such was vital to the mining operations of the Spanish colonial era. Mercury was necessary to extract silver from the ores produced in the silver mines of Peru, as well as those of Potosí in Upper Peru (now Bolivia), using amalgamation processes such as the patio process or pan amalgamation. Mercury was so essential that mercury consumption was the basis upon which the tax on precious metals, known as the quinto real ("royal fifth"), was levied.

The extraction of the 'quicksilver' in the socavones (tunnels) was extremely difficult. Every day before the miners came down, a mass for the dead was celebrated. Due to the need of numerous hand-workers and the high rate of mortality, the Viceroy of Peru Francisco de Toledo resumed and improved the pre-Columbian mandatory service of the mita. The allotted concession were rectangular, about 67x33m. Miners were divided in carreteros and barreteros.

Due to the discovery and then the extraction of the azogue (mercury) in a hill close to the actual location of the city, the Santa Barbara mine became famous in the new world and its activity led to the Viceroy of Peru, Francisco de Toledo, to establish the city in 1572 with the name of Villa Rica de Oropesa.

In 1648 the Viceroy of Peru, declared that Potosí and Huancavelica were "the two pillars that support this kingdom and that of Spain". Moreover, the viceroy thought that Spain could, if necessary, dispense with the silver from Potosí, but it could not dispense with the mercury from Huancavelica.

In the modern times, due to different political and economical events, the city went through a period of decades of lack of progress from the rest of the country. Now, this situation appears to change due to the attention of the recent government administrations.

A 1977 recording of a wedding song sung by a young girl from this region was included on the Golden Record carried on board the Voyager 1 and Voyager 2 probes.

== Climate ==
Climate data for Huancavelica (elevation 3,717 m (12,195 ft), (1991–2020 normals)
| Month | Jan | Feb | Mar | Apr | May | Jun | Jul | Aug | Sep | Oct | Nov | Dec | Year |
|---|---|---|---|---|---|---|---|---|---|---|---|---|---|
| Mean daily maximum °C (°F) | 16.4 (61.5) | 15.9 (60.6) | 15.7 (60.3) | 15.8 (60.4) | 16.6 (61.9) | 16.7 (62.1) | 16.7 (62.1) | 17.4 (63.3) | 17.2 (63.0) | 17.6 (63.7) | 19.0 (66.2) | 16.9 (62.4) | 16.8 (62.3) |
| Mean daily minimum °C (°F) | 3.8 (38.8) | 3.8 (38.8) | 3.7 (38.7) | 2.6 (36.7) | 0.7 (33.3) | −0.2 (31.6) | −0.1 (31.8) | 0.6 (33.1) | 2.3 (36.1) | 3.0 (37.4) | 3.4 (38.1) | 3.7 (38.7) | 2.3 (36.1) |
| Average precipitation mm (inches) | 153.7 (6.05) | 166.6 (6.56) | 155.8 (6.13) | 70.7 (2.78) | 21.1 (0.83) | 10.7 (0.42) | 16.7 (0.66) | 25.6 (1.01) | 50.5 (1.99) | 72.3 (2.85) | 71.9 (2.83) | 131.2 (5.17) | 946.8 (37.28) |
Source: National Meteorology and Hydrology Service of Peru

== Transportation ==
Buses run from Huancavelica to Huancayo and Lima by a paved road. There is another road that connects it with the city of Pisco in the coast. Buses depart from the bus station on the west side of the city.

Huancavelica is serviced by a train which runs between it and Huancayo known as "el Tren Macho". According to popular saying, this train "leaves when it wants and arrives when it can...".

In 2009, the line between the break-of-gauge at Huancayo to Huancavelica was being converted from 914 mm (3 ft) gauge to 1,435 mm (4 ft 8 1/2 in) gauge. By October 2010 it was finished and it is now in service.

== Education ==
Huancavelica is home of the local university, the National University of Huancavelica, which has branches in other cities in the region. The region is also home to the University for Andean Development (Universidad para el Desarrollo Andino) located in Lircay, which is a city one hour from Huancavelica. There are other technical institutes like the Technological High Institute (Instituto Superior Tecnologico) and the Instituto Superior Pedagogico.

== Health ==
The city has one hospital; the Hospital General, that serves the city and the nearby towns. Close to the hospital there is a clinic; the Policlinico EsSalud. Mercury, lead, and arsenic contamination owing to centuries of quicksilver mining in the city's surrounding expose approximately 19,000 of Huancavelica's residents to severe health threats. Exposure to these toxics has been linked to neuropsychological damage, kidney damage, fertility problems, and cancer, amongst others. Pregnant mothers, foetuses, and children are most at risk of health implications from mercury exposure.

== Places of interest ==
The city has monuments from the colonial era, most of them are churches in a number of eight, located in different parts of the city, of which the most important is the cathedral located at the main square. Another important site is the former Santa Barbara mine, located about three km. from the city on an ancient road that was famous during colonial times for the extraction of mercury.

The main sporting stadium is the IPD Stadium of Huancavelica. At 3,676 metres (12,060 ft) above sea level, it is one of the highest sporting stadiums in the world and has a capacity of 2,500 spectators.

== Notable residents ==
- Patricia Benavides (born 1969) - Lawyer, Peru's attorney general from June 2022 to December 2023

== See also ==
- Almadén (the other major source of mercury in the Spanish empire).
- Transport in Peru
