= Uchkus Inkañan =

Archaeological site in Peru

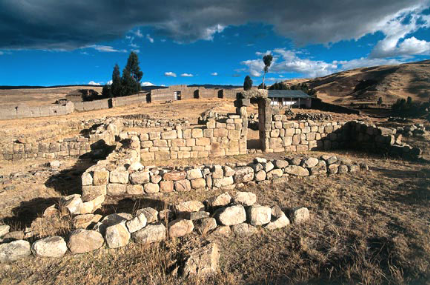
- Uchkus Inkañan

- Location within Peru
- 12.7374°S 74.8629°W
- Location: Peru
- Region: Huancavelica Region

Uchkus Inkañan (Quechua uchku hole, opening Inka Inca, ñan road, route, hispanicized spellings Uchcus Incañan, Uchkus Incanan, Uchkus Incañan) is an archaeological site in the Huancavelica Region in Peru. It is located in the Huancavelica Province, Yauli District.
