= Nuevo Occoro District =

Coordinates: 12.5948°S 75.0196°W

Nuevo Occoro
- District
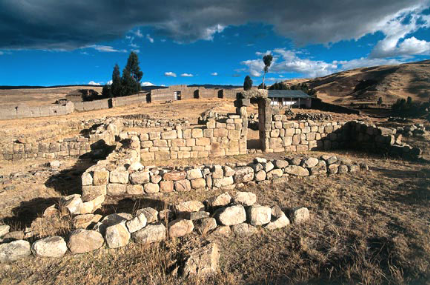
- Interactive map of Nuevo Occoro
- Country: Peru
- Region: Huancavelica
- Province: Huancavelica
- Founded: May 10, 1955
- Capital: Occoro

Government
  - Mayor: Alfredo Pariona Sinche

Area
  - Total: 211.56 km^{2} (81.68 sq mi)
- Elevation: 3,825 m (12,549 ft)

Population (2005 census)
  - Total: 2,638
  - Density: 12.47/km^{2} (32.30/sq mi)
- Time zone: UTC-5 (PET)
- UBIGEO: 090113

Nuevo Occoro District is one of nineteen districts of the province Huancavelica in Peru.

== Ethnic groups ==
The people in the district are mainly Indigenous citizens of Quechua descent. Quechua is the language which the majority of the population (77.14%) learnt to speak in childhood, 22.82% of the residents started speaking using the Spanish language (2007 Peru Census).

== See also ==
- Puka Q'asa
- Sitaq
- Tipiqucha
- Winchu Q'asa
