= Pinqullu (Ascensión) =

Mountain in Peru

- Location within Peru

Highest point
- Elevation: 5,096 m (16,719 ft)
- Coordinates: 12°51′58″S 75°10′18″W

Geography
- Location: Peru, Huancavelica Region
- Parent range: Andes, Chunta

Pinqullu (Aymara for a kind of flute of the Andes, Hispanicized spelling Pincullo) is a 5,096-metre (16,719 ft) mountain in the Chunta mountain range in the Andes of Peru. It lies in the Huancavelica Region, Huancavelica Province, Ascensión District, northwest of Antarasu. The river Kachimayu originates southwest of the mountain. It flows along the southern slopes of Pinqullu. Yawarqucha ("blood lake", Yahuarcocha) is the name of the little lake southwest of the peak.
