= Mariscal Cáceres District, Huancavelica =

Coordinates: 12.5341°S 74.9333°W

Mariscal Cáceres
- District
- Interactive map of Mariscal Cáceres
- Country: Peru
- Region: Huancavelica
- Province: Huancavelica
- Founded: March 27, 1935
- Capital: Mariscal Cáceres

Government
  - Mayor: Eugenio Cardenas Flores

Area
  - Total: 5.63 km^{2} (2.17 sq mi)
- Elevation: 2,847 m (9,341 ft)

Population (2005 census)
  - Total: 462
  - Density: 82.1/km^{2} (213/sq mi)
- Time zone: UTC-5 (PET)
- UBIGEO: 090111

Mariscal Cáceres District (Spanish mariscal marshal) is one of nineteen districts of the province Huancavelica in Peru.

The district was named after the Peruvian president Andrés Avelino Cáceres.
