= Acoria District =

Coordinates: 12.6429°S 74.8616°W

Acoria
- District
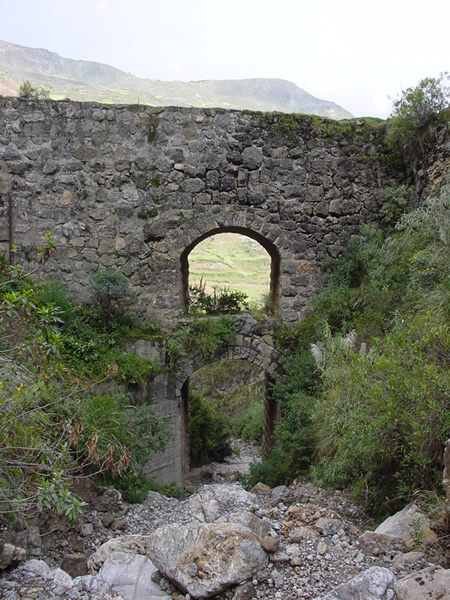
- Stone bridge in Acoria
- Interactive map of Acoria
- Country: Peru
- Region: Huancavelica
- Province: Huancavelica
- Capital: Acoria

Government
  - Mayor: Leonidas Leopoldo Bendezu Fernandez

Area
  - Total: 535.1 km^{2} (206.6 sq mi)
- Elevation: 3,167 m (10,390 ft)

Population (2005 census)
  - Total: 27,713
  - Density: 51.79/km^{2} (134.1/sq mi)
- Time zone: UTC-5 (PET)
- UBIGEO: 090103

Acoria District is one of nineteen districts of the Huancavelica Province in Peru.

== Geography ==
One of the highest peaks of the district is Pichqa Pukyu at approximately 4,400 m (14,400 ft). Other mountains are listed below:

- Asna Qucha
- Hatun Urqu
- Lima Lima
- Mulli Pata
- Muntiruyuq
- Qiñwa Pata
- Sallqantuy
- Suyu Qaqa
- Tika Wasi
- T'ula Urqun
- T'uru Rumi Urqu
- Willka P'iti
- Yana Chaka
- Yuraq Qaqa

== Ethnic groups ==
The people in the district are mainly Indigenous citizens of Quechua descent. Quechua is the language which the majority of the population (79.44%) learnt to speak in childhood, 20.35% of the residents started speaking using the Spanish language (2007 Peru Census).

== See also ==
- Llaqta Qulluy
