= Vilca District =

Coordinates: 12.4774°S 75.1835°W

Vilca Willka
- District
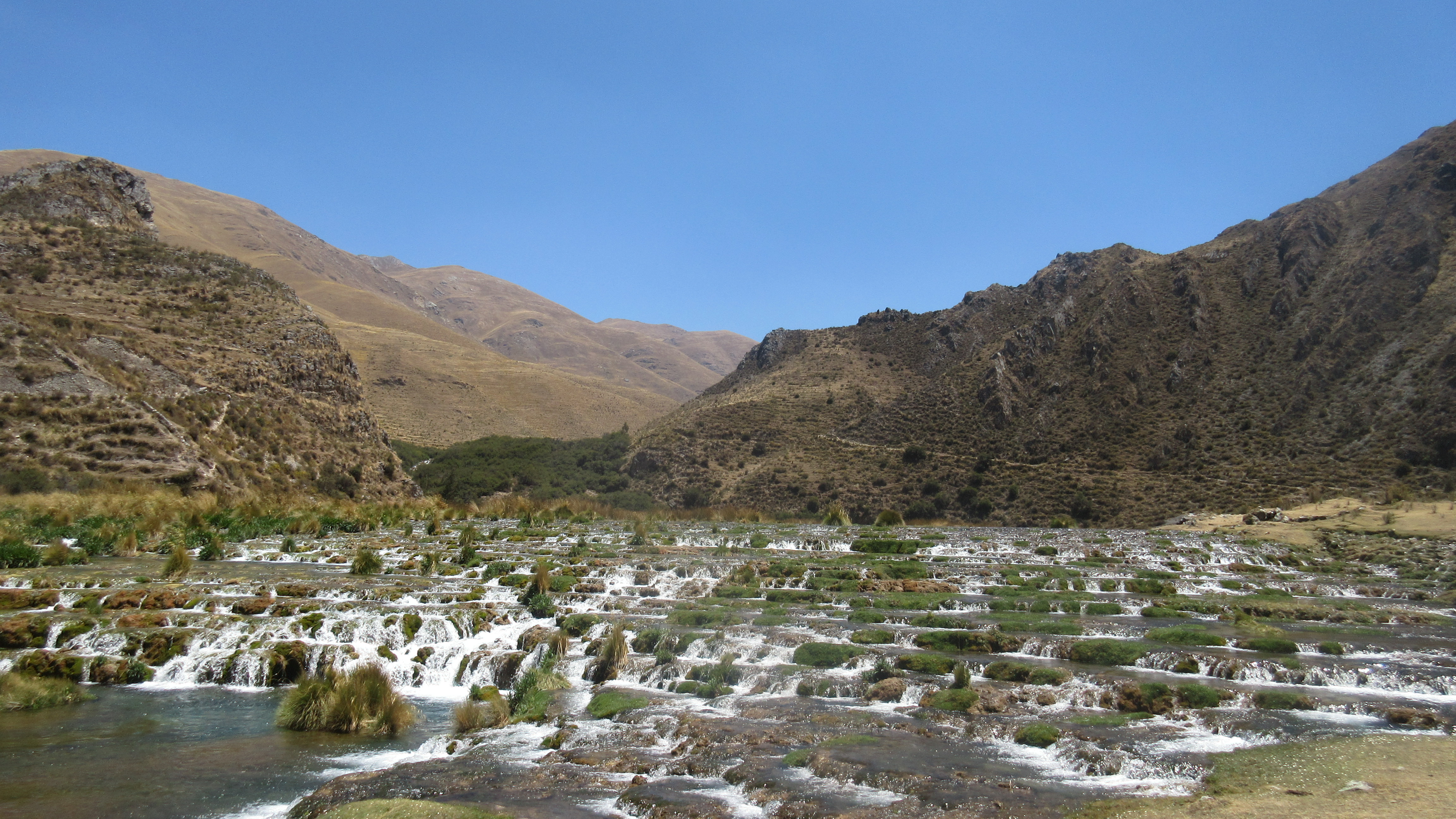
- Interactive map of Vilca
- Country: Peru
- Region: Huancavelica
- Province: Huancavelica
- Founded: September 15, 1920
- Capital: Vilca

Government
  - Mayor: Eugenio Surichaqui Lazo

Area
  - Total: 317.76 km^{2} (122.69 sq mi)
- Elevation: 3,275 m (10,745 ft)

Population (2005 census)
  - Total: 3,123
  - Density: 9.828/km^{2} (25.45/sq mi)
- Time zone: UTC-5 (PET)
- UBIGEO: 090116

Vilca District is one of nineteen districts of the Huancavelica Province in Peru.

== Geography ==
One of the highest peaks of the district is Wamanripayuq at approximately 4,600 m (15,100 ft). Other mountains are listed below:

- Anta Rumi
- Aqu Urqu
- Inti Wañunan
- Kuntur Pukyu
- Kuntur Saywa
- Llama Rumi
- Minasniyuq
- Puywanniyuq
- P'ukru
- Qucha Wayq'u
- Qutu Qutu
- Ranra Kancha
- Rasu Marka
- Suni Marka
- Suraqucha
- Tullpa
- Waman Urqu
- Wamani Urqu
- Wamanripa
- Wamanripayuq
- Wari
- Waych'aw
- Wayta Pata
- Yana Urqu

== Climate ==
Climate data for Huancalpi, Vilca, elevation 3,846 m (12,618 ft), (1991–2020)
Month	Jan	Feb	Mar	Apr	May	Jun	Jul	Aug	Sep	Oct	Nov	Dec	Year
Mean daily maximum °C (°F)	16.1 (61.0)	16.0 (60.8)	15.9 (60.6)	16.5 (61.7)	17.0 (62.6)	16.6 (61.9)	16.5 (61.7)	16.4 (61.5)	16.4 (61.5)	16.9 (62.4)	17.5 (63.5)	16.9 (62.4)	16.6 (61.8)
Mean daily minimum °C (°F)	4.7 (40.5)	5.1 (41.2)	5.1 (41.2)	4.1 (39.4)	2.5 (36.5)	0.4 (32.7)	−0.2 (31.6)	1.0 (33.8)	3.1 (37.6)	4.0 (39.2)	4.2 (39.6)	4.9 (40.8)	3.2 (37.8)
Average precipitation mm (inches)	150.5 (5.93)	151.9 (5.98)	132.8 (5.23)	69.8 (2.75)	26.5 (1.04)	19.6 (0.77)	20.0 (0.79)	25.5 (1.00)	42.1 (1.66)	82.8 (3.26)	76.2 (3.00)	135.7 (5.34)	933.4 (36.75)
Source: National Meteorology and Hydrology Service of Peru

== See also ==
- Llaqta Qulluy
