= Lake Agnococha =

- Location within Peru
- Location: Peru; Huancavelica Region
- Coordinates: 13°07′16″S 75°09′15″W
- Max. length: 3.54 km (2.20 mi)
- Max. width: 1.80 km (1.12 mi)
- Surface elevation: 4,714 m (15,466 ft)
Agnococha Dam
- Location within Peru
- Country: Peru
Dam and spillways
- Height: 19 m (62 ft)
- Length: 147 m (482 ft)
Reservoir
- Total capacity: 30,500,000 m^{3} (24,700 acre⋅ft)

Lake Agnococha (possibly from Quechua aknu beautiful, qucha lake) is a lake in Peru located in the Huancavelica Region, Castrovirreyna Province, Santa Ana District. It is situated at a height of approximately 4,714 m (15,466 ft), about 3.54 km long and 1.80 km at its widest point. Agnococha lies north of a larger lake named Orcococha.

The Agnococha dam was erected in 1957. It is 147 m (161 yd) long and 19 m (62 ft) high. The reservoir has a volume of 74,000 m^{3} (60 acre⋅ft) and a capacity of 30,500,000 m^{3} (24,700 acre⋅ft).
