= Manta District =

Coordinates: 12.6203°S 75.2110°W

Manta
- District
- Interactive map of Manta
- Country: Peru
- Region: Huancavelica
- Province: Huancavelica
- Founded: June 1, 1940
- Capital: Manta

Government
  - Mayor: Cirilo Araujo Matos

Area
  - Total: 154.14 km^{2} (59.51 sq mi)
- Elevation: 3,727 m (12,228 ft)

Population (2005 census)
  - Total: 1,244
  - Density: 8.071/km^{2} (20.90/sq mi)
- Time zone: UTC-5 (PET)
- UBIGEO: 090110

Manta District is one of nineteen districts of the province Huancavelica in Peru.

== Geography ==
One of the highest peaks of the district is Yana Q'asa at approximately 4,600 m (15,100 ft). Other mountains are listed below:

- Asnaq Aqu
- Chaqlla Q'asa
- Chunta Q'asa
- Hatun Saywa
- Huch'uy P'unqu
- Kunkayuq
- Mina Urqu
- Pichqa Pukyu
- Puka Urqu
- Phiruruyuq
- Thujsa
- Wiska
