= Chupamarca District =

Coordinates: 13.0376°S 75.6097°W

Chupamarca District Distrito de Chupamarka
- District
- Interactive map of Chupamarca District
- Country: Peru
- Region: Huancavelica
- Province: Castrovirreyna
- Founded: 2 January 1857
- Capital: Chupamarca

Area
  - Total: 373.78 km^{2} (144.32 sq mi)
- Elevation: 3,325 m (10,909 ft)

Population (2005 census)
  - Total: 1,209
  - Density: 3.235/km^{2} (8.377/sq mi)
- Time zone: UTC-5 (PET)
- UBIGEO: 090405

Chupamarca District is one of thirteen districts of the Castrovirreyna Province in Peru.

== Geography ==
One of the highest peaks of the district is Wallu Q'asa at approximately 5,100 m (16,700 ft). Other mountains are listed below:

- Aqchi
- Atuq Sipina
- Chuntani
- Ichhu Rutuna
- Inti Punku
- Pilluni
- Purun Kancha
- Phiruru Urqu
- Qarwa Q'asa
- Quri Mach'ay
- Saywa
- Tintayuq
- Umaña
- Urqu Pata
- Wamanripa
- Wamanripayuq
- Wayta Pampa
- Yanaqucha
- Yana Urqu
