= Huachocolpa District, Huancavelica =

Coordinates: 13.0317°S 74.9471°W

Huachocolpa Wachu Qullpa
- District
- Interactive map of Huachocolpa
- Country: Peru
- Region: Huancavelica
- Province: Huancavelica
- Founded: October 29, 1953
- Capital: Huachocolpa

Government
  - Mayor: Celso Condori Ramos (2007-2010)

Area
  - Total: 336.28 km^{2} (129.84 sq mi)
- Elevation: 3,956 m (12,979 ft)

Population ( (2005))
  - Total: 3,255
  - Density: 9.679/km^{2} (25.07/sq mi)
- Time zone: UTC-5 (PET)
- UBIGEO: 090106

Huachocolpa District is one of nineteen districts of the province Huancavelica in Peru.

== Geography ==
Some of the highest mountains of the district are listed below:

- Anqas
- Atuq Marka
- Chapi Urqu
- Chawpi Urqu
- Ch'aqra Punta
- Hatun Chupa Urqu
- Inqhana
- K'allapayuq
- Llipllina
- Pata Wasi
- Puka Punta
- Rayusqa
- Uña Paka
- Wamanripa
- Wayra Q'asa
- Yana Chuku
- Yana Mach'ay
- Yana Urqu (near Chapi Urqu)
- Yana Urqu
- Yawarqucha
- Yuraq Mach'ay

== Ethnic groups ==
The people in the district are mainly Indigenous citizens of Quechua descent. Quechua is the language which the majority of the population (54.92%) learnt to speak in childhood, 44.83% of the residents started speaking using the Spanish language (2007 Peru Census).
