= Moya District =

Coordinates: 12.4233°S 75.1538°W

Moya Muya
- District
- Interactive map of Moya
- Country: Peru
- Region: Huancavelica
- Province: Huancavelica
- Capital: Moya

Government
  - Mayor: Carlos Alberto Fonseca Martel

Area
  - Total: 94.08 km^{2} (36.32 sq mi)
- Elevation: 3,162 m (10,374 ft)

Population (2005 census)
  - Total: 1,706
  - Density: 18.13/km^{2} (46.97/sq mi)
- Time zone: UTC-5 (PET)
- UBIGEO: 090112

Moya District is one of nineteen districts of the province Huancavelica in Peru.
