= Conayca District =

Coordinates: 12.5199°S 75.0070°W

Conayca
- District
- Interactive map of Conayca
- Country: Peru
- Region: Huancavelica
- Province: Huancavelica
- Capital: Conayca

Government
  - Mayor: Alexander Darwin Cardenas Perales

Area
  - Total: 37.79 km^{2} (14.59 sq mi)
- Elevation: 3,682 m (12,080 ft)

Population (2005 census)
  - Total: 1,307
  - Density: 34.59/km^{2} (89.58/sq mi)
- Time zone: UTC-5 (PET)
- UBIGEO: 090104

Conayca District is one of nineteen districts of the province Huancavelica in Peru.

== See also ==
- Llaqta Qulluy (Conayca)
