= Huancavelica province =

Coordinates: 12°47′09″S 74°58′22″W

Huancavelica
- Province
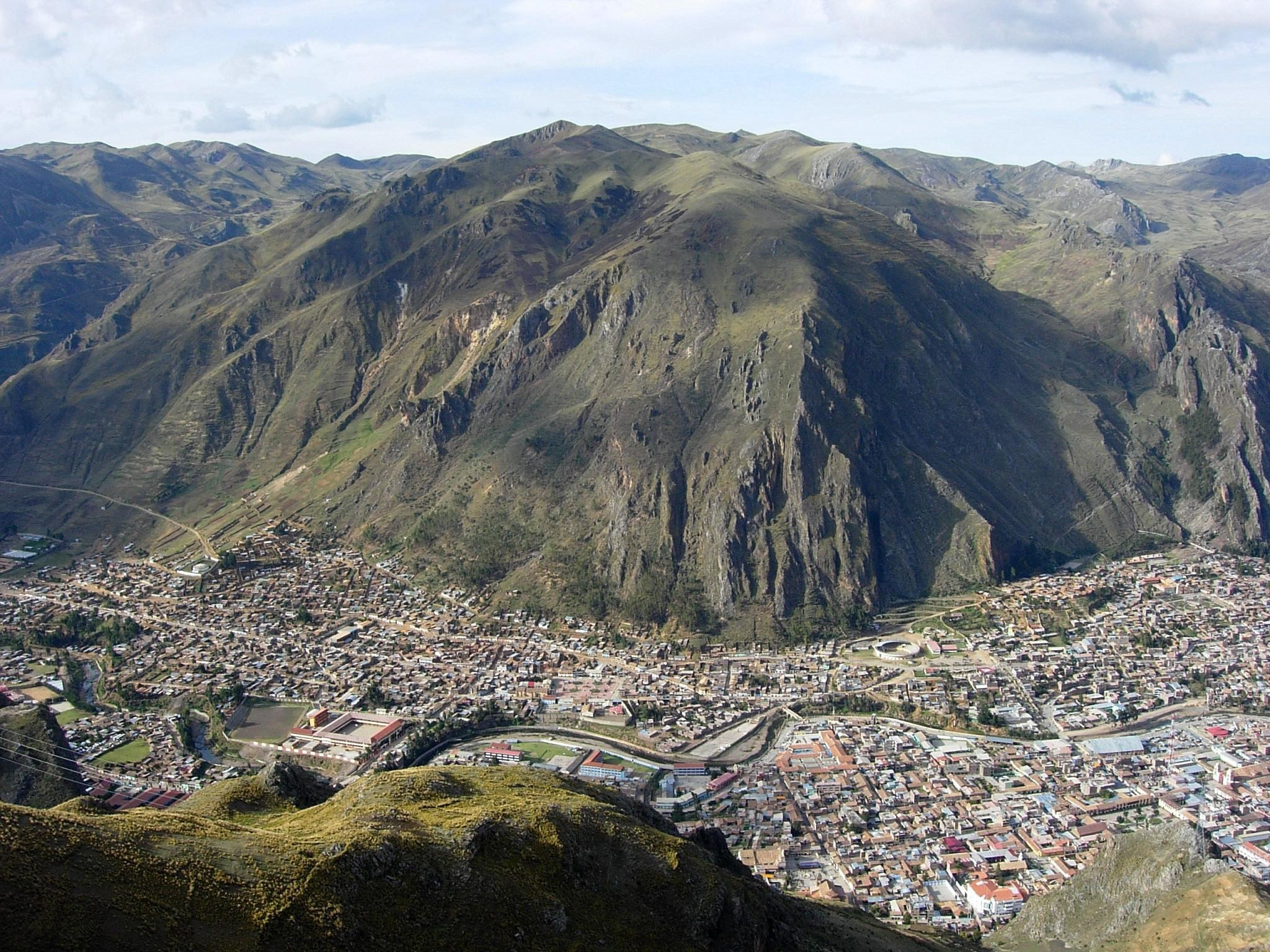
- Huancavelica

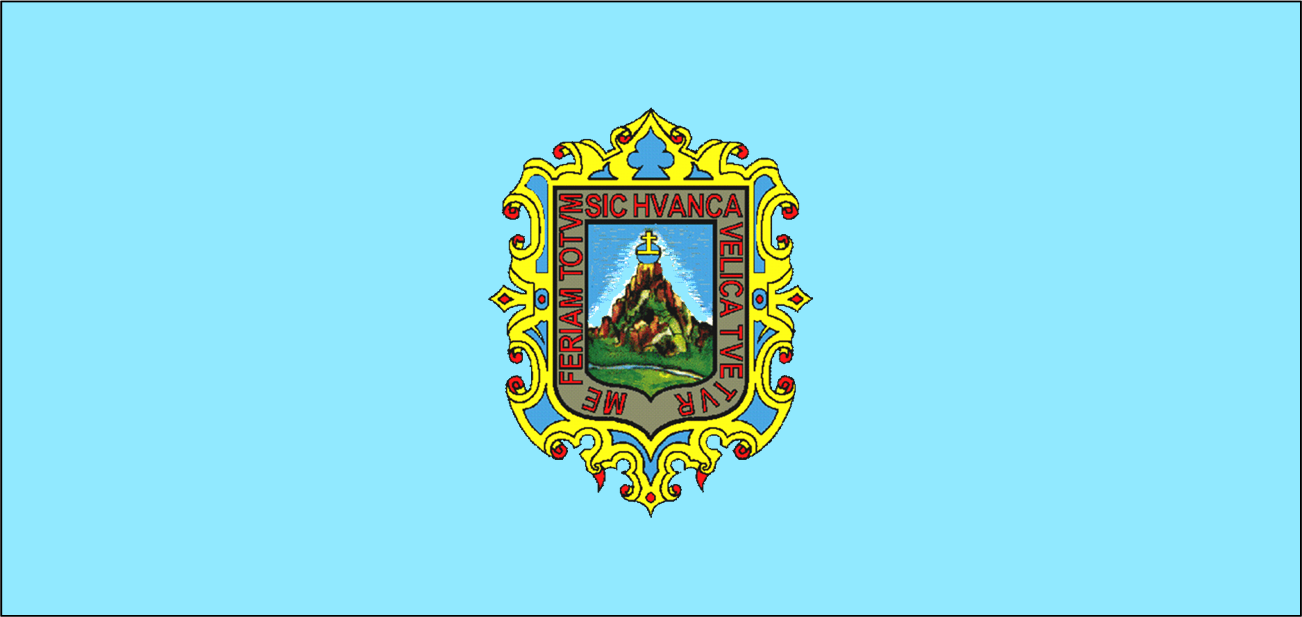
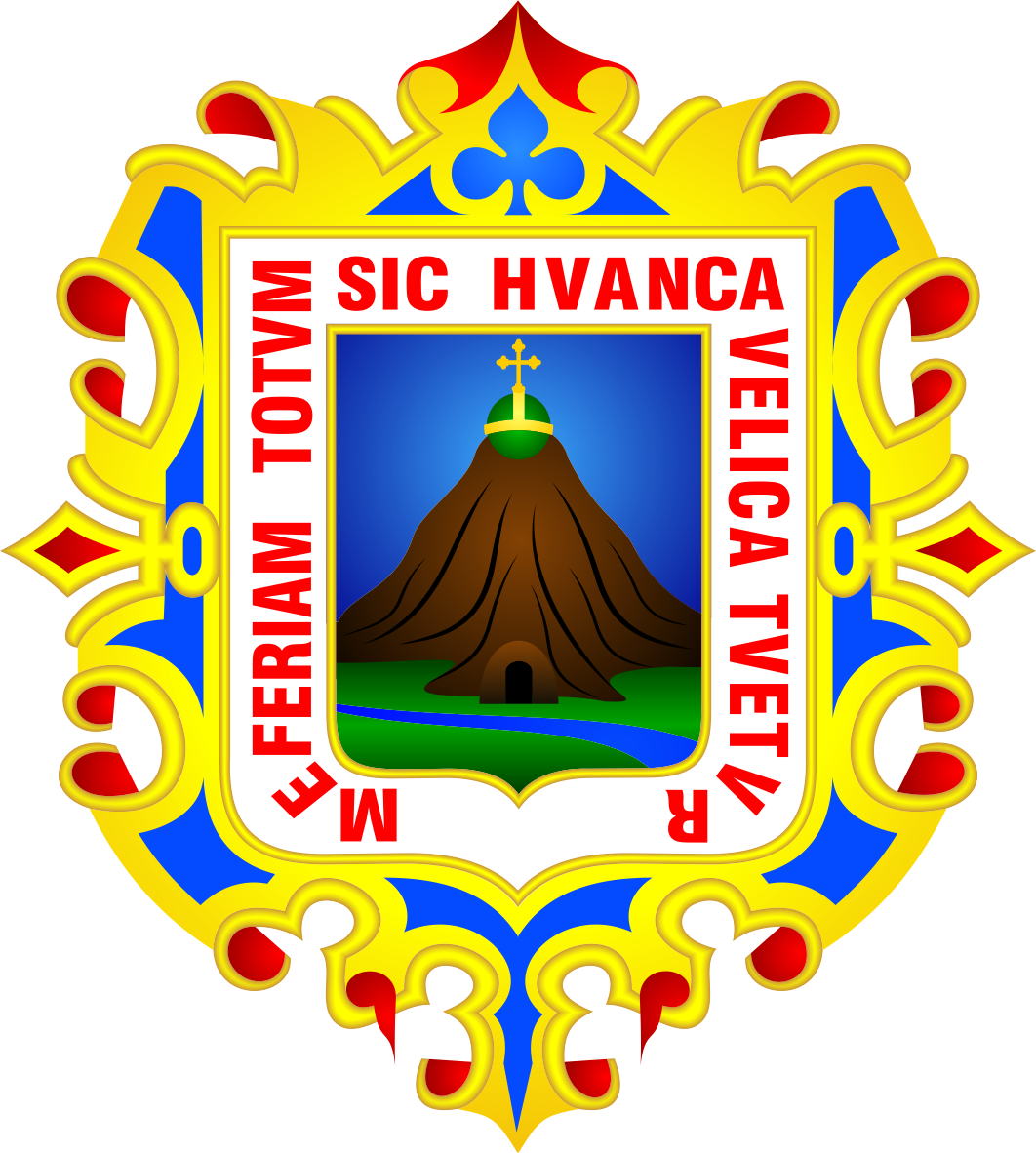
- Flag Coat of arms

- Location of Huancavelica in the Huancavelica Region
- Country: Peru
- Region: Huancavelica
- Capital: Huancavelica

Government
  - Mayor: Rómulo Cayllahua Paytán

Area
  - Total: 4,215.56 km^{2} (1,627.64 sq mi)

Population
  - Total: 115,054
  - Density: 27.2927/km^{2} (70.6878/sq mi)
- UBIGEO: 0901

Huancavelica is one of seven provinces located in the Huancavelica Region of Peru. The capital of this province is the city of Huancavelica.

== Boundaries ==
- North: province of Tayacaja
- East: provinces of Acobamba, Churcampa and Angaraes
- South: provinces of Huaytará and Castrovirreyna
- West: Lima Region and Junín Region

== Geography ==
There are a couple of large lakes in the province like Anqasqucha, Astuqucha, Chiliqucha, Chunchuqucha, Kanllaqucha, Milluqucha, Papaqucha, Qiwllaqucha, Tipiqucha, Warmiqucha and Ñawinqucha some of which belong to the largest lakes of Peru.

The Chunta mountain range traverses the province. Some of the highest peaks of the province are listed below:

- Anqas
- Anqasqucha
- Anta Q'asa
- Aqu Urqu
- Atuq Marka
- Chapi Urqu
- Chawpi Urqu
- Ch'aqra Punta
- Ch'uspi
- Hatun Chupa Urqu
- Hatun Pata
- Hatun Pirwayuq
- Hatun Q'asa
- Huch'uy Anqas
- Huch'uy Pirwayuq
- Inqhana
- Inti Wañunan
- Kachi Mach'ay Urqu
- Kaywa
- Kunkayuq
- Kuntur Wamani
- K'allapayuq
- Llipllina
- Millpu
- Pilluni
- Pinqullu (Ascensión)
- Pinqullu (Huancavelica)
- Pata Pata
- Pirwayuq
- Puka
- Puka Punta
- Puka Q'asa (Huanc.)
- Puka Q'asa (Cast.-Huanc.)
- Puka Rumi
- Puka Urqu
- Puywan
- Phiruruyuq
- Qarwa K'anti
- Qarwa Q'asa
- Qarwa Urqu
- Qarwarasu
- Qucha Q'asa
- Qullpa Qaqa
- Qullpapata
- Qusqu
- Q'iru Pinqullu
- Ranra Mach'ay
- Rayusqa
- Sitaq
- Uturunku
- Uña Paka
- Wachu Intiyuq
- Wamanrasu
- Waqutuyuq
- Wari
- Warmi Mach'ay
- Wasi Qaqa
- Wayllasqa
- Wayq'u Kancha
- Wayra Q'asa
- Winchu Q'asa
- Yana Chuku
- Yana Kancha
- Yana Ranra
- Yana Urqu
- Yana Urqu (near Chapi Urqu)
- Yarq'asqa
- Yawar Pukyu
- Yawarqucha
- Yawray
- Yuraq Mach'ay

== Political division ==
The province is divided into nineteen districts, which are:

- Acobambilla (Acobambilla)
- Acoria (Acoria)
- Ascensión (Ascención)
- Conayca (Conayca)
- Cuenca (Cuenca)
- Huachocolpa (Huachocolpa)
- Huancavelica (Huancavelica)
- Huando (Huando)
- Huayllahuara (Huayllahuara)
- Izcuchaca (Izcuchaca)
- Laria (Laria)
- Manta (Manta)
- Mariscal Cáceres (Mariscal Cáceres)
- Moya (Moya)
- Nuevo Occoro (Occoro)
- Palca (Palca)
- Pilchaca (Pilchaca)
- Vilca (Vilca)
- Yauli (Yauli)

== Ethnic groups ==
The people in the province are mainly Indigenous citizens of Quechua descent. Quechua is the language which the majority of the population (55.06%) learnt to speak in childhood, 44.70% of the residents started speaking using the Spanish language (2007 Peru Census).

== See also ==
- Administrative divisions of Peru
- Llaqta Qulluy (Acoria)
- Llaqta Qulluy (Conayca)
- Llaqta Qulluy (Vilca)
- Uchkus Inkañan
