= Huayllahuara District =

Huayllahuara Wayllawara
- District
- Location within Peru
- Coordinates: 12.4095°S 75.1784°W
- Country: Peru
- Region: Huancavelica
- Province: Huancavelica
- Founded: January 12, 1942
- Capital: Huayllahuara

Government
  - Mayor: Lucia Teofila Martinez Huaroc

Area
  - Total: 38.8 km^{2} (15.0 sq mi)
- Elevation: 3,896 m (12,782 ft)

Population (2005 census)
  - Total: 1,613
  - Density: 41.6/km^{2} (108/sq mi)
- Time zone: UTC-5 (PET)
- UBIGEO: 090107

Huayllahuara District is one of nineteen districts of the province Huancavelica in Peru.

The district has an approximate population of 14,000.
