= Huando District =

Coordinates: 12.5644°S 74.9473°W

Huando Wantu
- District
- Interactive map of Huando
- Country: Peru
- Region: Huancavelica
- Province: Huancavelica
- Founded: November 16, 1892
- Capital: Huando

Government
  - Mayor: Robert Geronimo Guerra Quinteros

Area
  - Total: 193.9 km^{2} (74.9 sq mi)
- Elevation: 3,562 m (11,686 ft)

Population (2005 census)
  - Total: 8,678
  - Density: 44.76/km^{2} (115.9/sq mi)
- Time zone: UTC-5 (PET)
- UBIGEO: 090119

Huando District is one of nineteen districts of the province Huancavelica in Peru.

== Ethnic groups ==
The people in the district are mainly Indigenous citizens of Quechua descent. Quechua is the language which the majority of the population (53.49%) learnt to speak in childhood, 46.10% of the residents started speaking using the Spanish language (2007 Peru Census).
