= Wallu Q'asa =

Mountain in Peru

- Location within Peru

Highest point
- Elevation: 5,100 m (16,700 ft)
- Coordinates: 12°51′52″S 75°24′53″W

Geography
- Location: Peru, Huancavelica Region
- Parent range: Andes, Chunta

Wallu Q'asa (Quechua wallu earless, someone whose ears are amputated, q'asa mountain pass, Hispanicized spelling Huallojasa) is a mountain in the Chunta mountain range in the Andes of Peru, about 5,100 metres (16,732 ft) high. It is located in the Huancavelica Region, Castrovirreyna Province, on the border of the districts of Chupamarca and Aurahuá. Wallu Q'asa lies northeast of Wichinka Lake.
