= Llaqta Qulluy, Conayca =

Archaeological site in Peru

Llaqta Qulluy
- Location: Peru
- Region: Huancavelica Region, Huancavelica Province

Site notes
- Height: 3,400 m (11,200 ft)

Llaqta Qulluy (Quechua llaqta place (village, town, city, country, nation), qulluy to die out, become extinct; to fail, "extinct town", also spelled Llaqta Qolloy) is an archaeological site in Peru on a mountain of that name. It is situated in the Huancavelica Region, Huancavelica Province, Conayca District. The predominantly circular walls of Llaqta Qulluy are situated at a height of about 3,400 m (11,200 ft).
