= Tantara District =

Coordinates: 13.0739°S 75.6447°W

Tantara
- District
- Interactive map of Tantara
- Country: Peru
- Region: Huancavelica
- Province: Castrovirreyna
- Founded: January 12, 1921
- Capital: Tantara

Area
  - Total: 113.01 km^{2} (43.63 sq mi)
- Elevation: 2,882 m (9,455 ft)

Population (2005 census)
  - Total: 727
  - Density: 6.43/km^{2} (16.7/sq mi)
- Time zone: UTC-5 (PET)
- UBIGEO: 090412

Tantara District is one of thirteen districts of the province Castrovirreyna in Peru.
