= Palca District, Huancavelica =

Coordinates: 12.6567°S 74.9806°W

Palca P'allqa
- District
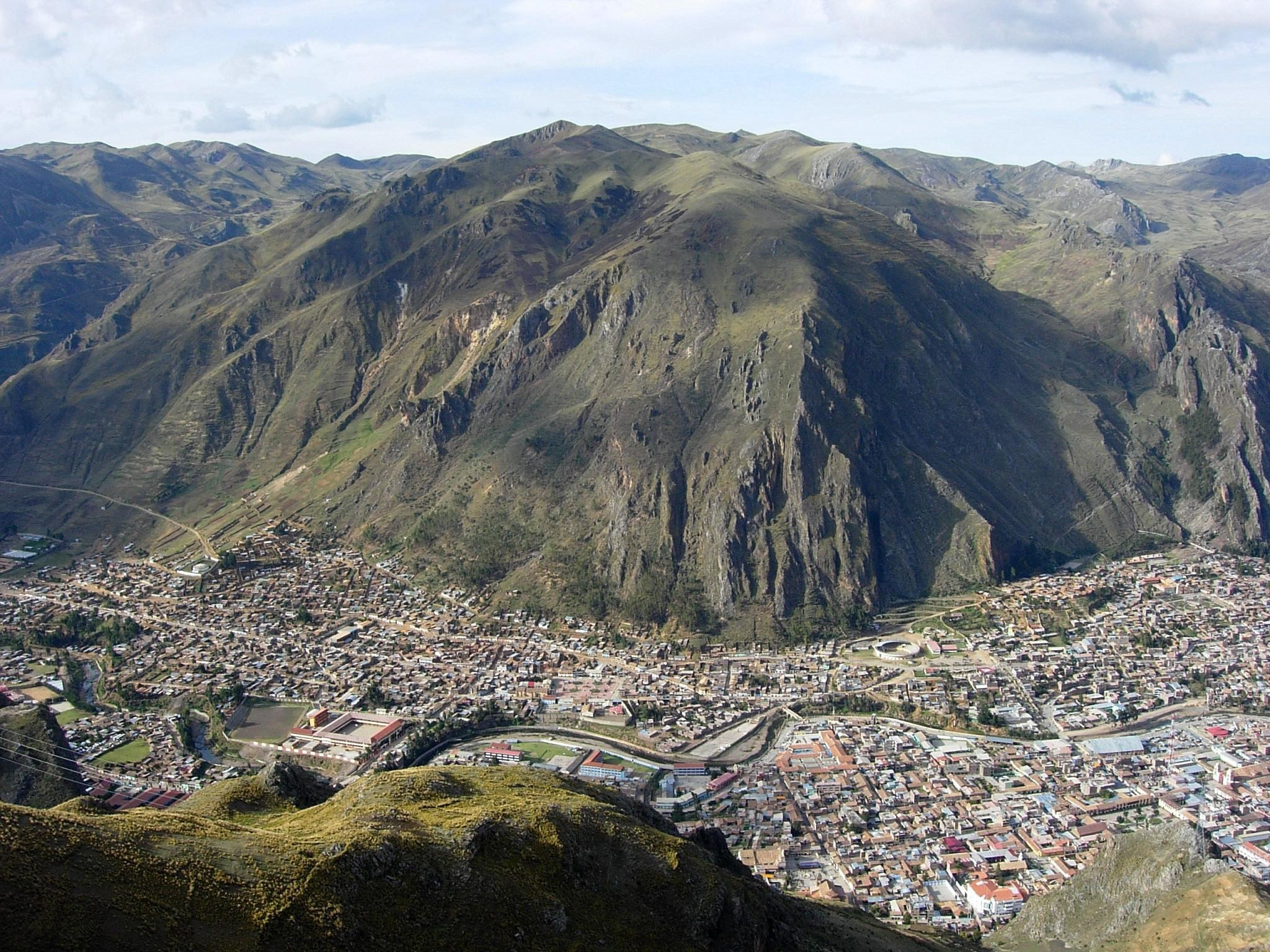
- Palca District, Huancavelica
- Interactive map of Palca
- Country: Peru
- Region: Huancavelica
- Province: Huancavelica
- Founded: June 8, 1959
- Capital: Palca

Area
  - Total: 82.08 km^{2} (31.69 sq mi)
- Elevation: 3,650 m (11,980 ft)

Population (2005 census)
  - Total: 3,527
  - Density: 42.97/km^{2} (111.3/sq mi)
- Time zone: UTC-5 (PET)
- UBIGEO: 090114

Palca District is one of nineteen districts of the province Huancavelica in Peru.

== Ethnic groups ==
The people in the district are mainly Indigenous citizens of Quechua descent. Quechua is the language which the majority of the population (70.33%) learnt to speak in childhood, 29.49% of the residents started speaking using the Spanish language (2007 Peru Census).
