= K'allapayuq =

Mountain in Peru

- Location within Peru

Highest point
- Elevation: 5,000 m (16,000 ft)
- Coordinates: 13°02′19″S 75°01′26″W

Geography
- Location: Peru, Huancavelica Region
- Parent range: Andes, Chunta

K'allapayuq (Quechua k'allapa stretcher, -yuq a suffix to indicate ownership, "the one with a stretcher", Hispanicized spelling Callapayoc) is a mountain in the Chunta mountain range in the Andes of Peru, about 5,000 metres (16,404 ft) high. It is located in the Huancavelica Region, Huancavelica Province, Huacocolpa District. K'allapayuq lies northeast of Ch'aqra Punta and southeast of Puka Punta.
