= Sitaq =

Mountain in Peru

- Location within Peru

Highest point
- Elevation: 5,304 m (17,402 ft)
- Coordinates: 12°48′7″S 75°14′8″W

Geography
- Location: Peru, Huancavelica Region
- Parent range: Andes, Chunta

Climbing
- First ascent: 1961

Sitaq (Quechua, Hispanicized spelling Citac) is a mountain in the Chunta mountain range in the Andes of Peru, about 5,304 metres (17,402 ft) high. It is located in the Huancavelica Region, Huancavelica Province, on the border of the districts Acobambilla and Nuevo Occoro. The ridge of Sitaq, formed like a semicircle, lies west of the lake Tipiqucha.
