= Pilchaca District =

Coordinates: 12.4012°S 75.0838°W

Pilchaca
- District
- Interactive map of Pilchaca
- Country: Peru
- Region: Huancavelica
- Province: Huancavelica
- Founded: August 16, 1920
- Capital: Pilchaca

Government
  - Mayor: Ruben Francisco Matos Diaz

Area
  - Total: 42.97 km^{2} (16.59 sq mi)
- Elevation: 3,584 m (11,759 ft)

Population (2005 census)
  - Total: 790
  - Density: 18/km^{2} (48/sq mi)
- Time zone: UTC-5 (PET)
- UBIGEO: 090115

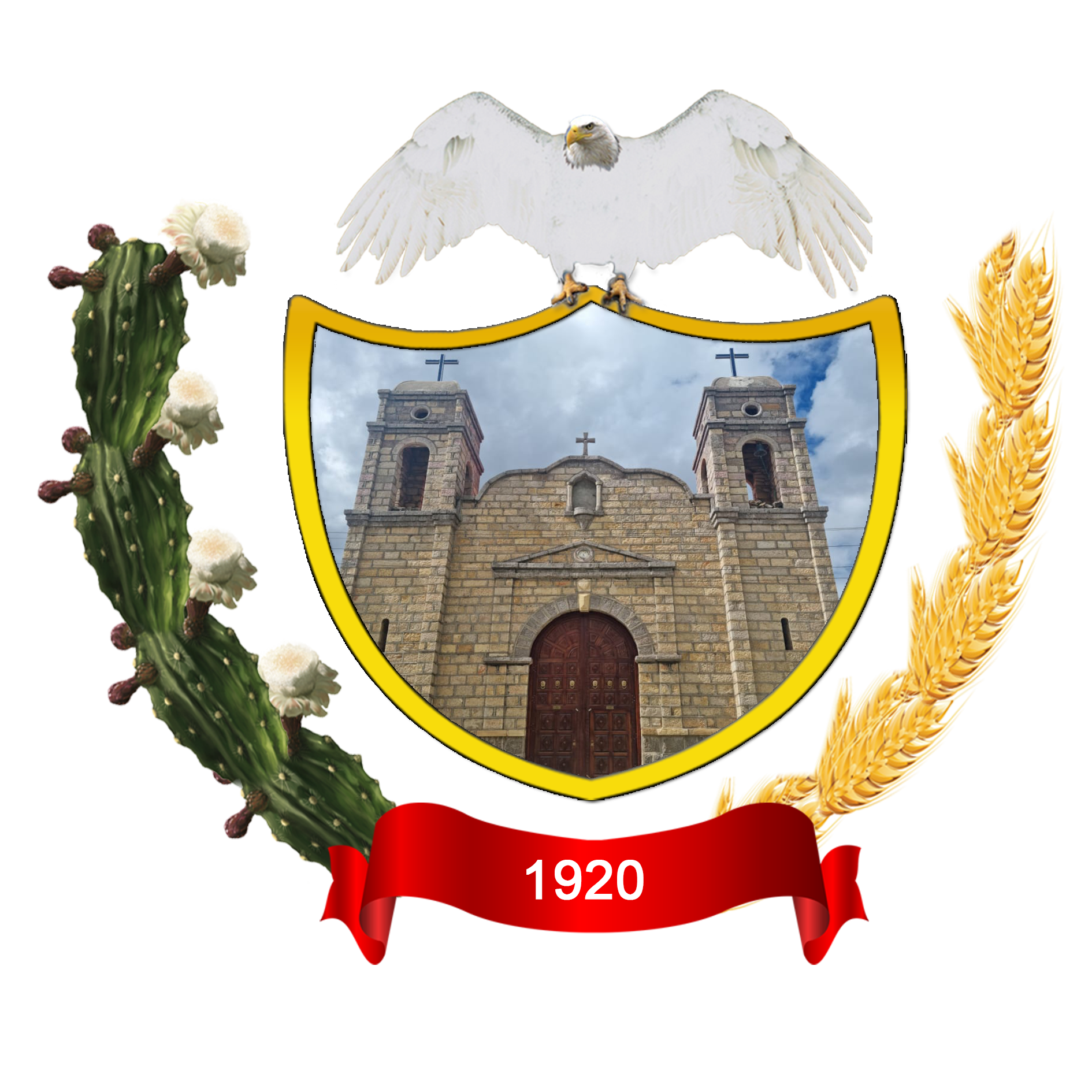
The Pilchaca shield

Pilchaca District is one of nineteen districts of the province Huancavelica in Peru.

== Climate ==
Climate data for Pilchaca, elevation 3,586 m (11,765 ft), (1991–2020)
Month	Jan	Feb	Mar	Apr	May	Jun	Jul	Aug	Sep	Oct	Nov	Dec	Year
Mean daily maximum °C (°F)	17.0 (62.6)	16.8 (62.2)	16.8 (62.2)	17.6 (63.7)	18.4 (65.1)	18.2 (64.8)	18.1 (64.6)	18.1 (64.6)	18.0 (64.4)	18.2 (64.8)	18.7 (65.7)	17.9 (64.2)	17.8 (64.1)
Mean daily minimum °C (°F)	5.5 (41.9)	5.7 (42.3)	5.8 (42.4)	5.2 (41.4)	3.7 (38.7)	2.4 (36.3)	2.0 (35.6)	2.8 (37.0)	3.9 (39.0)	4.8 (40.6)	5.2 (41.4)	5.4 (41.7)	4.4 (39.9)
Average precipitation mm (inches)	120.2 (4.73)	129.3 (5.09)	96.9 (3.81)	39.1 (1.54)	15.8 (0.62)	7.9 (0.31)	11.2 (0.44)	16.6 (0.65)	36.1 (1.42)	54.6 (2.15)	56.7 (2.23)	93.7 (3.69)	678.1 (26.68)
Source: National Meteorology and Hydrology Service of Peru
