= Llaqta Qulluy, Vilca =

Archaeological site in Peru

Llaqta Qulluy
- Location: Peru
- Region: Huancavelica Region, Huancavelica Province, Vilca District

Llaqta Qulluy (Quechua llaqta place (village, town, city, country, nation), qulluy to die out, become extinct; to fail, "extinct town", also spelled Llaqta Qolloy) is an archaeological site in Peru. It is situated in the Huancavelica Region, Huancavelica Province, Vilca District. Llaqta Qulluy was declared a National Cultural Heritage (Patrimonio Cultural).
