= Lake Chilicocha =

- Location within Peru
- Location: Peru; Huancavelica Region
- Coordinates: 12°41′14″S 75°24′34″W

Chilicocha Dam
- Location within Peru
- Country: Peru

Dam and spillways
- Height: 4 m (13 ft)

Power Station
- Operator: Electroperu

Lake Chilicocha (in the local (Wanka Quechua) pronunciation variant where r is often pronounced as l) or Lake Chiricocha (possibly from Southern Quechua chiri cold, qucha lake, "cold lake") is a lake in Peru located in the Huancavelica Region, Huancavelica Province, Acobambilla District. Lake Chilicocha lies southeast of lakes Acchicocha and Angascocha. The mountain at the western shore of Lake Chilicocha is named Wilacocha (or Wiracocha). The lake belongs to the watershed of the Mantaro River.

The Chilicocha dam was built in 1999. It is 4 m (4.4 yd) high. It is operated by Electroperu.
