= Wachu Intiyuq =

Mountain in Peru

- Location within Peru

Highest point
- Elevation: 5,000 m (16,000 ft)
- Coordinates: 12°57′13″S 75°09′21″W

Geography
- Location: Peru, Huancavelica Region
- Parent range: Andes, Chunta

Wachu Intiyuq (Quechua wachu ridge between two furrows; row, inti sun, -yuq a suffix to indicate ownership, Hispanicized spelling Huachuintiyoc) is a mountain in the Chunta mountain range in the Andes of Peru, about 5,000 metres (16,404 ft) high. It lies in the Huancavelica Region, Huancavelica Province, Huancavelica District, southwest of Antarasu.
