= Wayra Q'asa (Huancavelica) =

Mountain in Peru

- Location within Peru

Highest point
- Elevation: 5,000 m (16,000 ft)
- Coordinates: 13°05′22″S 75°02′30″W

Geography
- Location: Peru, Huancavelica Region
- Parent range: Andes, Chunta

Wayra Q'asa (Quechua wayra wind, q'asa mountain pass, "wind pass", Hispanicized spelling Huayrajasa) is a mountain in the Chunta mountain range in the Andes of Peru, about 5,000 metres (16,404 ft) high. It is located in the Huancavelica Region, Castrovirreyna Province, Santa Ana District, and in the Huancavelica Province, Huachocolpa District.
