= Angascocha (mountain) =

Mountain in Peru

- Location within Peru

Highest point
- Elevation: 5,000 m (16,000 ft)
- Coordinates: 12°38′20″S 75°24′50″W

Geography
- Location: Peru, Huancavelica Region
- Parent range: Andes, Chonta

Angascocha (possibly from Quechua anqas blue, qucha lake) is a mountain in the northern part of the Chonta mountain range in the Andes of Peru, about 5,000 m (16,404 ft) high. It is situated in the Huancavelica Region, Huancavelica Province, Acobambilla District, near the border with the Junín Region. Angascocha lies north of Huch'uy Anqas and northeast of the lake named Anqasqucha.
