= Yauli, Huancavelica =

Town in Peru

Coordinates: 12°46′15″S 74°51′03″W

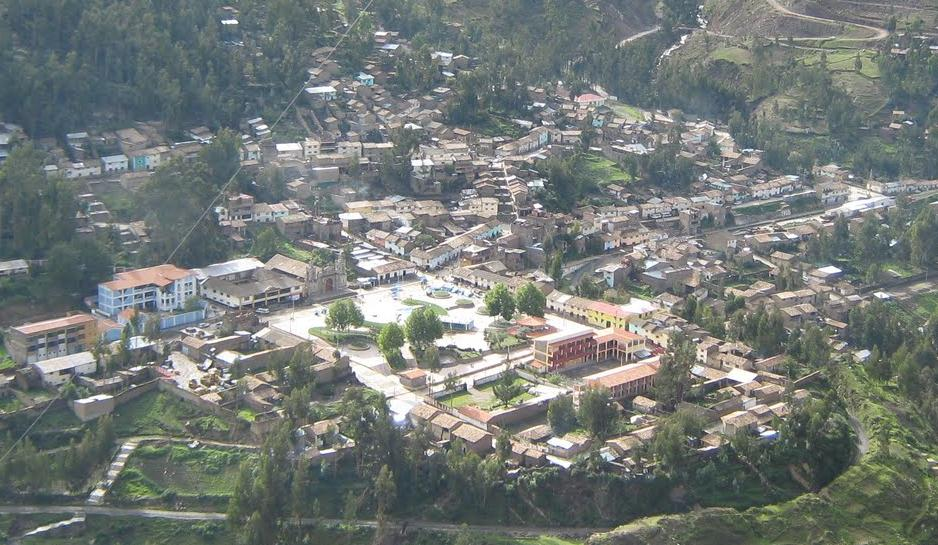
An aerial view of Yauli

Yauli is a town in the region of Huancavelica, Province of Huancavelica, district of Yauli, Peru. The town is the capital of the district of the same name. According to the census of 2007, it has a population of 4,186.

The town is visited for the textiles and crafts that its people create. The town has a basic medical clinic (Posta Medica). It is connected to the provincial capital by a road and by railroad, both about 15 kilometers long.
