= Tipiqucha (Huancavelica) =

Lake in Peru

- Location within Peru
- Location: Peru; Huancavelica Region, Huancavelica Province
- Coordinates: 12°47′42″S 75°12′52″W

Tipiqucha (Quechua tipi Pennisetum clandestinum (a grass species), tipiy to husk maize, to snap, to break, qucha lake, Hispanicized spelling Tipicocha) is a lake in Peru located in the Huancavelica Region, Huancavelica Province, Nuevo Occoro District. Tipiqucha lies in the southwestern part of the district, east of Sitaq.

== See also ==
- List of lakes in Peru
