= Wamanrasu =

Mountain in Peru

- Location within Peru

Highest point
- Elevation: 5,304 m (17,402 ft)
- Coordinates: 12°54′57″S 75°02′34″W

Geography
- Location: Peru, Huancavelica Region
- Parent range: Andes, Chunta

Climbing
- First ascent: 1-1965 via N.E. ridge, traverse to S. peak, descend S. ridge.

Wamanrasu (Quechua waman falcon or variable hawk, Ancash Quechua rasu snow, ice, mountain with snow, Hispanicized spellings Huamanrazo, Huamanrazu) is a mountain in the Chunta mountain range in the Andes of Peru, about 5,304 metres (17,402 ft) high. It is located in the Huancavelica Region, Castrovirreyna Province, Santa Ana District and in the Huancavelica Province, Huancavelica District. Wamanrasu lies northeast of the mountain Antarasu and northwest of the mountain Qarwarasu (Carhuarazo) of the Huancavelica Region.

The local peasants consider Wamanrasu to be the mightiest Apu of the region.
