= Kachimayu (Huancavelica) =

- Etymology: Quechua

Location
- Country: Peru
- Region: Huancavelica Region

Physical characteristics
- Mouth: Ichhu River

Kachimayu (Quechua kachi salt, mayu river, "salt river", hispanicized spelling Cachimayo) is a river in Peru located in the Huancavelica Region, Huancavelica Province, on the border of the districts of Ascensión and Huancavelica. It originates in the Chunta mountain range northwest of the peak of Antarasu near the village of Kachimayu (Cachimayo). At its confluence with the Pukapampa-Astupampa (Pucabamba-Astobamba) River, it forms the Ichhu River, which is an important affluent of the Mantaro River. The river flows generally from north to south and receives water from Islacocha before joining the Astobamba River to form the Ichhu. The Cachimayo microcuenca has a seasonal hydrological regime, with lower ecological flows from March to August and higher flows from September to February.
