= Castrovirreyna province =

Coordinates: 12°47′09″S 74°58′22″W

Castrovirreyna
- Province
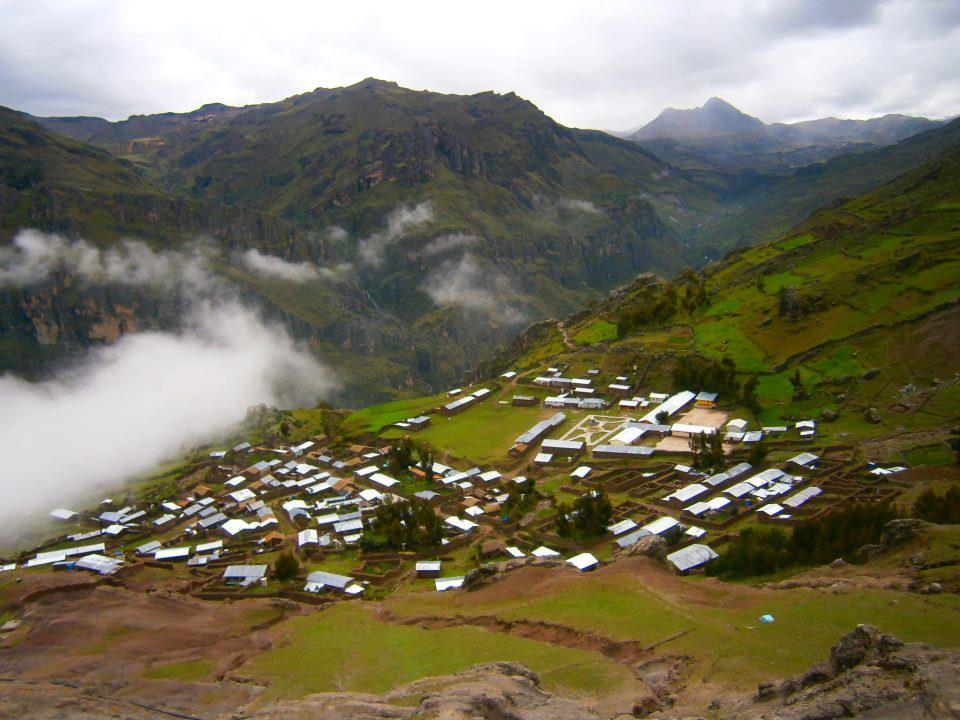
- Awqa Urqu (in the background, on the right) as seen from Cochamarca (Quchamarka) in the southwest

- Location of Castrovirreyna in the Huancavelica Region
- Country: Peru
- Region: Huancavelica
- Capital: Castrovirreyna

Area
  - Total: 3,984.62 km^{2} (1,538.47 sq mi)

Population (2005 census)
  - Total: 20,018
  - Density: 5.0238/km^{2} (13.012/sq mi)
- UBIGEO: 0904

Castrovirreyna is one of seven provinces located in the Huancavelica Region of Peru. The capital of this province is the city of Castrovirreyna.

== Geography ==
The Chunta mountain range traverses the province. Some of the highest peaks of the province are listed below:

- Allpa Qutu
- Allqa Q'asa
- Ananta
- Anta Mach'ay
- Artisa
- Awqa Urqu
- Awqay Pata
- Chuqi Warmi
- Ch'aqra Punta
- Hatun Pukyu
- Ichhu Rutuna
- Kuntur Wamani
- Kuntur Wamani (Castr.)
- Kunturillu
- Kuyuq Urqu
- Mach'ay Pata
- Pata Pata
- Paychi Urqu
- Pichqa Pukyu
- Pilluni
- Pinqullu
- Pirwalla
- Puka Punta
- Puka Q'asa
- Puma Pukyu
- Phiruru Urqu
- Qarwa Pampa
- Qarwa K'anti
- Qarwa Q'asa
- Qarwarasu
- Qucha Q'asa
- Qusqu
- Q'ara Wayuna
- Ranra Urqu
- Saqsa Punta
- Sukullu
- Suyt'u Sura
- Tuku Wasi
- Urququcha
- Wallu Q'asa
- Wamanripayuq
- Waraquyuq
- Wayllachayuq
- Wayra Q'asa
- Yana Pampa
- Yana Ranra
- Yana Urqu
- Yanaqucha
- Yawar Q'asa
- Yawarqucha
- Yuraq Q'asa

== Political division ==
The province is divided into thirteen districts:

- Arma (Arma)
- Aurahua (Aurahua)
- Capillas (Capillas)
- Castrovirreyna (Castrovirreyna)
- Chupamarca (Chupamarca)
- Cocas (Cocas)
- Huachos (Huachos)
- Huamatambo (Huamatambo)
- Mollepampa (Mollepampa)
- San Juan (San Juan)
- Santa Ana (Santa Ana)
- Tantara (Tantara)
- Ticrapo (Ticrapo)

== Ethnic groups ==
The province is inhabited by Indigenous citizens of Quechua descent. Spanish is the language which the majority of the population (77.20%) learnt to speak in childhood, 22.30% of the residents started speaking using the Quechua language (2007 Peru Census).

== See also ==
- Aknuqucha
- Chuqlluqucha
- Urququcha
