= Inqhana =

Mountain in Peru

- Location within Peru

Highest point
- Elevation: 5,050 m (16,570 ft)
- Coordinates: 13°05′57″S 74°59′16″W

Geography
- Location: Peru, Huancavelica Region
- Parent range: Andes

Inqhana (Quechua for fuel, also spelled Inganna) is a mountain in the Andes of Peru, about 5,050 metres (16,568 ft) high. It is located in the Huancavelica Region, Huancavelica Province, Huacocolpa District. Inqhana lies north of Yawarqucha and Atuq Marka.
