= Lake Angascocha =

Lake in Huancavelica, Peru

- Location within Peru
- Location: Peru; Huancavelica Region
- Coordinates: 12°38′59″S 75°25′38″W
- Max. length: 1.8 km (1.1 mi)
- Max. width: 0.86 km (0.53 mi)
- Surface area: 126.53 ha (312.7 acres)
- Surface elevation: 4,644 m (15,236 ft)

Lake Angascocha (possibly from Quechua anqas blue, qucha lake) is a lake in Peru located in the Huancavelica Region, Huancavelica Province, Acobambilla District. It is situated at a height of approximately 4,644 metres (15,236 ft), about 1.8 km long and 0.86 km at its widest point. Lake Angascocha lies east of Lake Acchicocha, between Ñawinqucha in the northwest and Chiliqucha in the southeast. The mountain northeast of the lake is named Angascocha, too.

== See also ==
- List of lakes in Peru
