= Chonta mountain range =

Mountain range in Peru

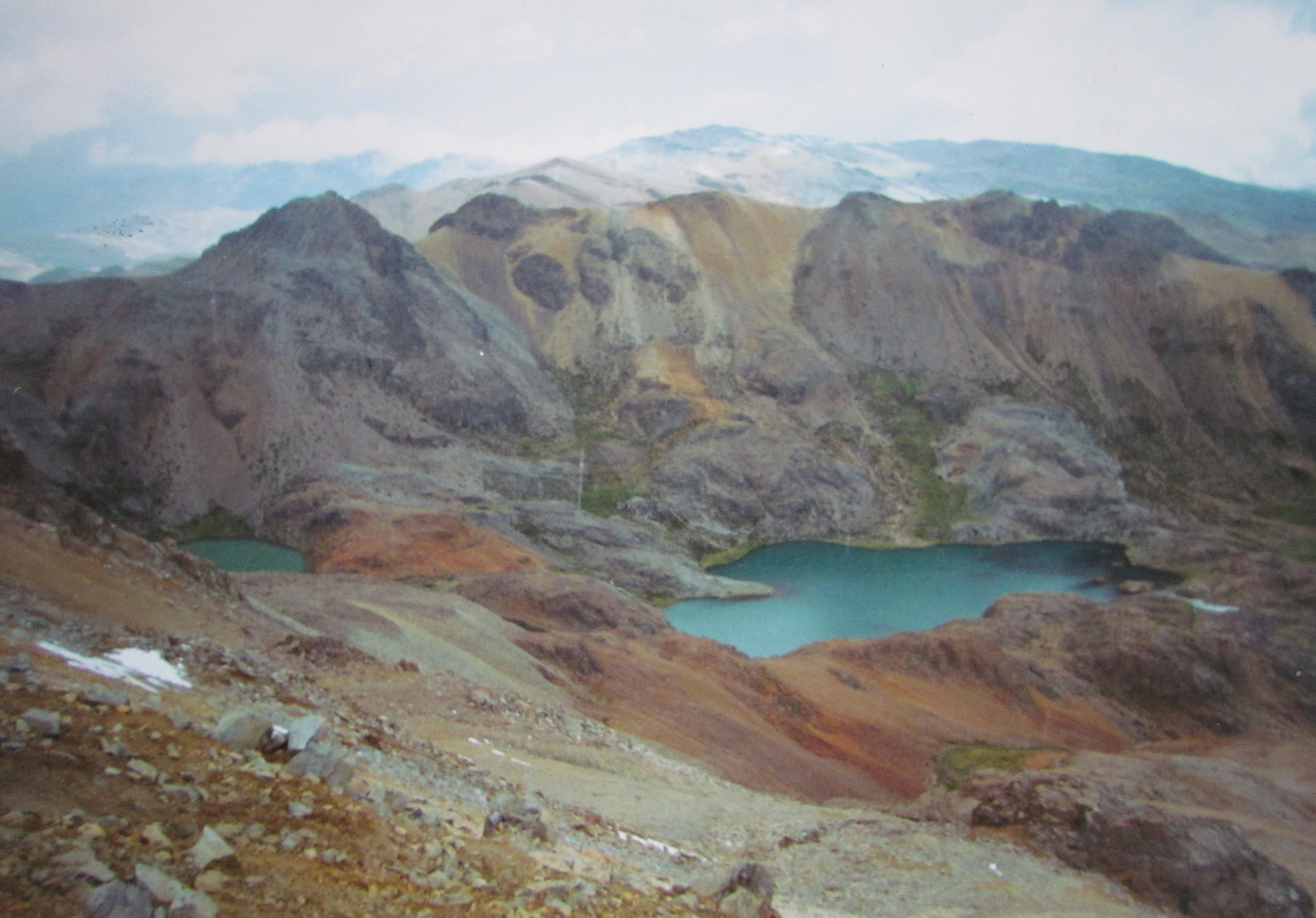
- The western extensions of the Chonta mountain range as seen from Sukullu (looking to the south)

Dimensions
- Length: 50 km (31 mi) N-S

Geography
- Country: Peru
- Region: Huancavelica Region
- Parent range: Andes

The Chonta mountain range (possibly from Aymara chunta prolonged, lengthened, Quechua chunta a kind of palm,) lies in the Huancavelica Region in the Andes of Peru. It extends between 12°37' and 13°07'S and 75°00' and 75°30'W for about 50 km. It is located in the Castrovirreyna Province and in the Huancavelica Province.

== Mountains ==
Some of the highest mountains in the range are listed below:

- Tanranu, 5,431 metres (17,818 ft)
- T'uruyuq, 5,396 metres (17,703 ft)
- Palumu, 5,308 metres (17,415 ft)
- Wamanrasu, 5,304 metres (17,402 ft)
- Sitaq, 5,304 metres (17,402 ft)
- Hatun Pata, 5,182 metres (17,001 ft)
- Huch'uy Anqas, 5,182 metres (17,001 ft)
- Antarasu, 5,180 metres (16,995 ft)
- Qarwarasu, 5,159 metres (16,926 ft)
- Puka Punta, 5,136 metres (16,850 ft)
- Wallu Q'asa, 5,100 metres (16,732 ft)
- Pinqullu, 5,096 metres (16,719 ft)
- Sukullu, 5,095 metres (16,716 ft)
- Kunturay (Condoray), 5,055 metres (16,585 ft)
- Pata Pata, 5,052 metres (16,575 ft)
- Qarwa Q'asa, 5,005 metres (16,421 ft)
- Anqasqucha, 5,000 metres (16,404 ft)
- Chuntarahu (Chontaraju), 5,000 metres (16,404 ft)
- Ch'aqra Punta, 5,000 metres (16,404 ft)
- Ichhu Rutuna, 5,000 metres (16,404 ft)
- Kachi Mach'ay Urqu, 5,000 metres (16,404 ft)
- Kunkayuq, 5,000 metres (16,404 ft)
- K'allapayuq, 5,000 metres (16,404 ft)
- Puka Rumi, 5,000 metres (16,404 ft)
- Qarwa K'anti, 5,000 metres (16,404 ft)
- Qusqu, 5,000 metres (16,404 ft)
- Q'iru Pinqullu, 5,000 metres (16,404 ft)
- Wachu Intiyuq, 5,000 metres (16,404 ft)
- Wamanripayuq, 5,000 metres (16,404 ft)
- Wari, 5,000 metres (16,404 ft)
- Wayra Q'asa, 5,000 metres (16,404 ft)
- Winchu Q'asa, 5,000 metres (16,404 ft)
- Yana Urqu (Cast.), 5,000 metres (16,404 ft)
- Yana Urqu (Huanc.), 5,000 metres (16,404 ft)
- Yarq'asqa, 5,000 metres (16,404 ft)
- Yawar Q'asa, 5,000 metres (16,404 ft)
- Awqa Urqu, 4,982 metres (16,345 ft)
- Yana Pampa, 4,954 metres (16,253 ft)
- Aqchi, 4,800 metres (15,748 ft)
- Atuq Marka, 4,800 metres (15,748 ft)
- Kuntur Wamani, 4,800 metres (15,748 ft)
- Kuntur Wamani (Castr.), 4,800 metres (15,748 ft)
- Pinqullu, 4,800 metres (15,748 ft)
- Phiruru Urqu, 4,800 metres (15,748 ft)
- Puka Q'asa (Cast.-Huan.), 4,800 metres (15,748 ft)
- Puka Q'asa (Huan.), 4,800 metres (15,748 ft)
- Qalla Qalla, 4,800 metres (15,748 ft)
- Q'ara Wayuna, 4,800 metres (15,748 ft)
- Taruja Marka, 4,800 metres (15,748 ft)
- Waqutuyuq, 4,800 metres (15,748 ft)
- Yuraq Mach'ay, 4,800 metres (15,748 ft)
- Wayta Urqu, 4,712 metres (15,459 ft)
- Qarwa Urqu, 4,600 metres (15,092 ft)
- Tuku Wasi, 4,600 metres (15,092 ft)
- Ukhu P'ukru, 4,600 metres (15,092 ft)
- Pichqa Pukyu, 4,385 metres (14,386 ft)
