= Antarasu =

Mountain in Peru

- Location within Peru

Highest point
- Elevation: 5,180 m (16,990 ft)
- Coordinates: 12°56′14″S 75°07′47″W

Geography
- Location: Peru, Huancavelica Region
- Parent range: Andes, Chunta

Climbing
- First ascent: 1965 O. Hartmann

Antarasu (Quechua anta copper, Ancash Quechua rasu snow, ice, mountain with snow, "snow-covered copper mountain", Hispanicized spelling Antarazo) is a mountain in the Chunta mountain range in the Andes of Peru, about 5,180 metres (16,995 ft) high. It is located in the Huancavelica Region, Castrovirreyna Province, Santa Ana District and in the Huancavelica Province, Huancavelica District. Antarasu lies west of the mountain Qarwarasu (Carhuarazo) of the Huancavelica Region and southwest of the mountain Wamanrasu.

== See also ==
- Qarwarasu
- Wamanrasu
