= Aurahua District =

Coordinates: 13.0346°S 75.5703°W

Aurahua
- District
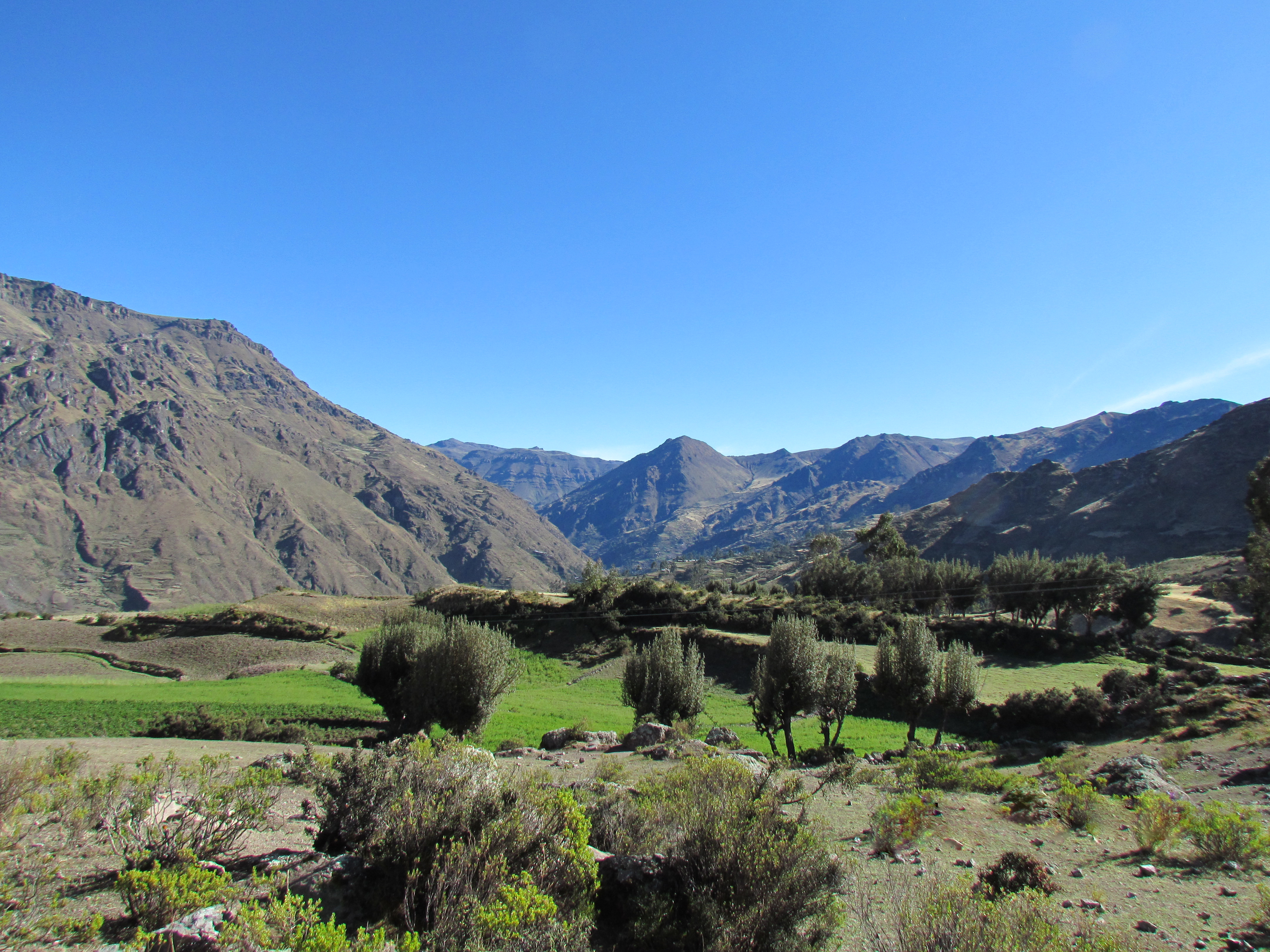
- Mountains and fields in the Aurahua District
- Interactive map of Aurahua
- Country: Peru
- Region: Huancavelica
- Province: Castrovirreyna
- Founded: September 6, 1920
- Capital: Aurahua

Area
  - Total: 360.97 km^{2} (139.37 sq mi)
- Elevation: 3,470 m (11,380 ft)

Population (2005 census)
  - Total: 2,353
  - Density: 6.519/km^{2} (16.88/sq mi)
- Time zone: UTC-5 (PET)
- UBIGEO: 090403

Aurahua District is one of thirteen districts of the Castrovirreyna Province in Peru.
