= Castrovirreyna District =

Coordinates: 13.2834°S 75.3191°W

Castrovirreyna
- District
- Interactive map of Castrovirreyna
- Country: Peru
- Region: Huancavelica
- Province: Castrovirreyna
- Capital: Castrovirreyna

Area
  - Total: 937.94 km^{2} (362.14 sq mi)
- Elevation: 3,956 m (12,979 ft)

Population (2005 census)
  - Total: 3,883
  - Density: 4.140/km^{2} (10.72/sq mi)
- Time zone: UTC-5 (PET)
- UBIGEO: 090401

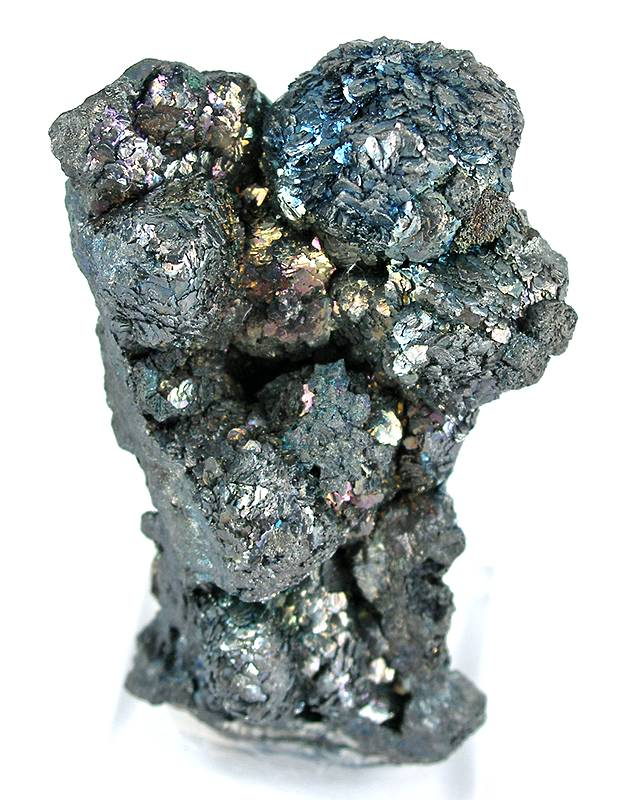
Miargyrite and/or Baumstarkite, San Genaro Mine, Castrovirreyna District, Peru. Size 6.1 x 4.2 x 2.7 cm.

Castrovirreyna District is one of thirteen districts of the Castrovirreyna Province in Peru.

== Climate ==
Climate data for San Juan de Castrovirreyna, elevation 1,856 m (6,089 ft), (1991–2020)
Month	Jan	Feb	Mar	Apr	May	Jun	Jul	Aug	Sep	Oct	Nov	Dec	Year
Mean daily maximum °C (°F)	23.7 (74.7)	23.3 (73.9)	23.7 (74.7)	24.5 (76.1)	25.0 (77.0)	24.7 (76.5)	24.8 (76.6)	24.7 (76.5)	24.8 (76.6)	24.7 (76.5)	24.6 (76.3)	24.2 (75.6)	24.4 (75.9)
Mean daily minimum °C (°F)	13.0 (55.4)	13.9 (57.0)	14.1 (57.4)	13.2 (55.8)	12.4 (54.3)	11.5 (52.7)	11.5 (52.7)	11.7 (53.1)	12.0 (53.6)	12.1 (53.8)	12.4 (54.3)	12.7 (54.9)	12.5 (54.6)
Average precipitation mm (inches)	50.4 (1.98)	53.6 (2.11)	53.1 (2.09)	10.5 (0.41)	0.9 (0.04)	0 (0)	0 (0)	0.3 (0.01)	1.0 (0.04)	5.0 (0.20)	6.4 (0.25)	18.7 (0.74)	199.9 (7.87)
Source: National Meteorology and Hydrology Service of Peru

Climate data for Pacococha, elevation 4,356 m (14,291 ft), (1971–2000)
Month	Jan	Feb	Mar	Apr	May	Jun	Jul	Aug	Sep	Oct	Nov	Dec	Year
Mean daily maximum °C (°F)	11.0 (51.8)	10.8 (51.4)	11.3 (52.3)	12.0 (53.6)	11.5 (52.7)	11.4 (52.5)	11.4 (52.5)	12.4 (54.3)	12.3 (54.1)	12.3 (54.1)	12.2 (54.0)	11.7 (53.1)	11.7 (53.0)
Mean daily minimum °C (°F)	−1.0 (30.2)	−1.1 (30.0)	−0.7 (30.7)	−1.3 (29.7)	−3.0 (26.6)	−4.5 (23.9)	−5.6 (21.9)	−5.0 (23.0)	−4.6 (23.7)	−4.2 (24.4)	−4.0 (24.8)	−2.6 (27.3)	−3.1 (26.4)
Average precipitation mm (inches)	224.0 (8.82)	185.0 (7.28)	206.0 (8.11)	90.0 (3.54)	29.0 (1.14)	4.0 (0.16)	4.0 (0.16)	4.0 (0.16)	28.0 (1.10)	50.0 (1.97)	52.0 (2.05)	116.0 (4.57)	992 (39.06)
Average relative humidity (%)	75	79	78	70	59	55	49	47	52	57	60	70	63
Source: FAO
