= Santa Ana District, Castrovirreyna =

Coordinates: 13.0718°S 75.1402°W

Santa Ana District
- District
- Interactive map of Santa Ana District
- Country: Peru
- Region: Huancavelica
- Province: Castrovirreyna
- Founded: January 8, 1965
- Capital: Santa Ana

Area
  - Total: 622.1 km^{2} (240.2 sq mi)
- Elevation: 4,473 m (14,675 ft)

Population (2005 census)
  - Total: 1,208
  - Density: 1.942/km^{2} (5.029/sq mi)
- Time zone: UTC-5 (PET)
- UBIGEO: 090411

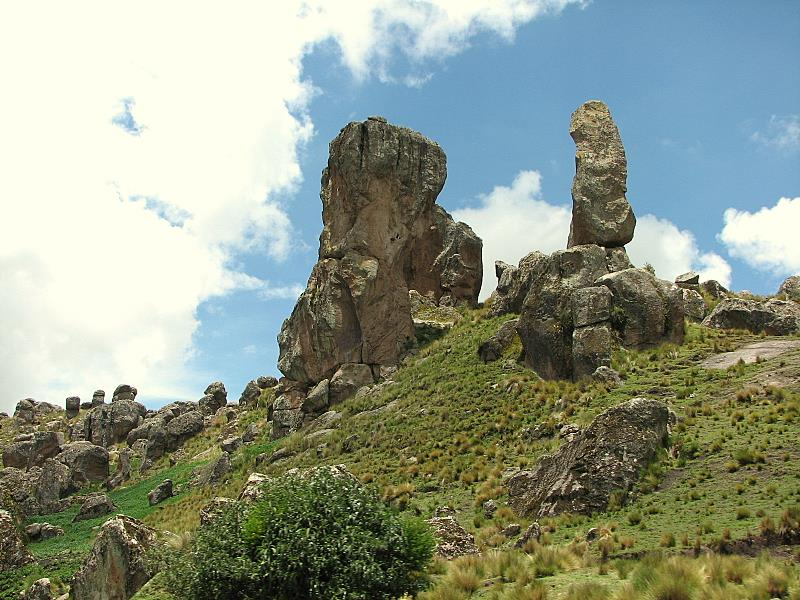
Piedra Stones in Huancavelica

Santa Ana District is one of 13 districts of the province Castrovirreyna in Peru.

== Climate ==
Climate data for Choclococha, Santa Ana, elevation 4,547 m (14,918 ft), (1991–2020)
Month	Jan	Feb	Mar	Apr	May	Jun	Jul	Aug	Sep	Oct	Nov	Dec	Year
Mean daily maximum °C (°F)	11.2 (52.2)	11.1 (52.0)	11.1 (52.0)	11.3 (52.3)	11.3 (52.3)	11.4 (52.5)	11.4 (52.5)	12.1 (53.8)	12.1 (53.8)	12.8 (55.0)	13.4 (56.1)	11.6 (52.9)	11.7 (53.1)
Mean daily minimum °C (°F)	0.2 (32.4)	1.0 (33.8)	1.1 (34.0)	−0.1 (31.8)	−1.7 (28.9)	−3.6 (25.5)	−4.5 (23.9)	−4.9 (23.2)	−2.6 (27.3)	−1.6 (29.1)	−1.0 (30.2)	−0.1 (31.8)	−1.5 (29.3)
Average precipitation mm (inches)	192.2 (7.57)	207.0 (8.15)	187.1 (7.37)	101.2 (3.98)	28.8 (1.13)	12.1 (0.48)	9.9 (0.39)	21.6 (0.85)	41.1 (1.62)	74.5 (2.93)	70.4 (2.77)	153.9 (6.06)	1,099.8 (43.3)
Source: National Meteorology and Hydrology Service of Peru

== See also ==
- Aknuqucha
- Chuqlluqucha
- Urququcha
