= Q'illu Urqu (Huancavelica) =

Mountain in Peru

- Location within Peru

Highest point
- Elevation: 4,600 m (15,100 ft)
- Coordinates: 13°17′58″S 74°50′49″W

Geography
- Location: Peru, Huancavelica Region
- Parent range: Andes

Q'illu Urqu (Quechua q'illu yellow, urqu mountain, "yellow mountain", Hispanicized spelling Jelloorcco) is a mountain in the Andes of Peru, about 4,600 m (15,092 ft) high. It is situated in the Huancavelica Region, Huaytará Province, Pilpichaca District. It lies southeast of Wakan Q'allay and Qispi Q'awa and northwest of Antara.
