= Huaytará province =

Coordinates: 13.603713°S 75.353047°W

Huaytará
- Province
- Location of Huaytará in the Huancavelica Region
- Country: Peru
- Region: Huancavelica
- Capital: Huaytará

Government
  - Mayor: Ricardo Yauricasa

Area
  - Total: 6,458.39 km^{2} (2,493.60 sq mi)

Population
  - Total: 17,247
  - Density: 2.6705/km^{2} (6.9165/sq mi)
- UBIGEO: 0906

Huaytará is the largest of seven provinces located in the Huancavelica Region of Peru. The capital city is Huaytará. The province has a population of 17,247 inhabitants as of 2017.

== Boundaries ==
- North: provinces of Castrovirreyna, Huancavelica and Angaraes
- East: Ayacucho Region
- South: Ica Region and Ayacucho Region
- West: Ica Region

== Geography ==
Some of the highest mountains of the province are listed below:

- Anta Maqana
- Antara
- Anqasqucha
- Antara
- Aqu Q'asa
- Aqu Urqu
- Artisayuq
- Chuqi Warmi
- Chuqllu Punta
- Ch'uspi
- Hatun P'ukru
- Hatun Rumi
- Hatun Surayuq
- Hatun Urqu
- Hatun Waraqu
- Hatun Wasi
- Inti Watana
- Kawituchayuq
- Machu Qichqa
- K'uchu Urqu
- Llipllina
- Muyuq Urqu
- Pachasniyuq
- Pata Wasi
- Pilluni
- Puka Q'asa
- Puka Urqu
- Puma Ranra
- Phutunqu
- P'unqu Qaqa
- Qispi Q'awa
- Qucha Urqu
- Qulluta
- Q'illu Kancha
- Q'illu Punta
- Q'illu Urqu
- Sura Wasi
- Tuku Pukyu
- Uma Kunka
- Uña Paka
- Uska Maska
- Wakan Q'allay
- Walla Q'asa
- Wamanripayuq
- Wisk'acha
- Yana Ranra
- Yana Urqu
- Yawarqucha (Huancavelica)
- Yawarqucha (Huaytará)
- Yuraq Kancha
- Yuraq Tampu
- Yuraq Urqu

== Political division ==
The province is divided into sixteen districts, which are:

- Ayaví (Ayaví)
- Córdova (Córdova)
- Huayacundo Arma (Huayacundo Arma)
- Huaytará (Huaytará)
- Laramarca (Laramarca)
- Ocoyo (Ocoyo)
- Pilpichaca (Pilpichaca)
- Querco (Querco)
- Quito-Arma (Quito-Arma)
- San Antonio de Cusicancha (Cusicancha)
- San Francisco de Sangayaico (San Francisco de Sangayaico)
- San Isidro (San Juan de Huirpacancha)
- Santiago de Chocorvos (Santiago de Chocorvos)
- Santiago de Quirahuara (Santiago de Quirahuara)
- Santo Domingo de Capillas (Santo Domingo de Capillas)
- Tambo (Tambo)

== Ethnic groups ==
The province is inhabited by Indigenous citizens of Quechua descent. Spanish is the language which the majority of the population (73.93%) learnt to speak in childhood; 25.85% of the residents started speaking using the Quechua language (2007 Peru Census).

== See also ==
- Ccotanca
- Ccuelluccasa
- Challwamayu
- Chuqlluqucha
- Inka Wasi
- Q'araqucha
- Runayuq
- Urququcha
- Wiraqucha Pirqa
