= Puka Q'asa (Huaytará) =

Mountain in Peru

- Location within Peru

Highest point
- Elevation: 4,800 m (15,700 ft)
- Coordinates: 13°11′17″S 74°59′55″W

Naming
- Language of name: Quechua

Geography
- Location: Peru, Huancavelica Region, Huaytará Province
- Parent range: Andes

Puka Q'asa (Quechua puka red, q'asa mountain pass, "red mountain pass", also spelled Pucaccasa) is a mountain in the Huancavelica Region in Peru, about 4,800 metres (15,748 ft) high. It is located in the Huaytará Province, Pilpichaca District. Puka Q'asa lies southwest of a mountain named Yawarqucha, east of Chuqlluqucha. The little lake northwest of Puka Q'asa is Wachwaqucha ("Andean goose lake").
