= Qullpapata =

Mountain in Peru

- Location within Peru

Highest point
- Elevation: 4,922 m (16,148 ft)
- Coordinates: 12°40′22″S 75°33′07″W

Geography
- Location: Peru, Huancavelica Region, Junín Region
- Parent range: Andes

Qullpapata (Quechua qullpa salty, saltpeter, pata elevated place; above, at the top; edge; bank (of a river), shore, Hispanicized spelling Cullpapata) is a 4,922-metre-high (16,148 ft) mountain in the Andes of Peru. It is situated in the Huancavelica Region, Huancavelica Province, Acobambilla District. Qullpapata lies west of Warmiqucha, one of the largest lakes of Peru, and south of Milluqucha.
