= Machu Qichqa =

Mountain in Peru

- Location within Peru

Highest point
- Elevation: 4,800 m (15,700 ft)
- Coordinates: 13°15′21″S 74°50′24″W

Naming
- Language of name: Quechua

Geography
- Location: Peru, Huancavelica Region, Huaytará Province
- Parent range: Andes

Machu Qichqa (Quechua machu old, old person, Chanka Quechua qichqa cliff, "old cliff", also spelled Machoccechcca) is a mountain in the Huancavelica Region in Peru, about 4,800 metres (15,748 ft) high. It is situated in the Huaytará Province, Pilpichaca District. Machu Qichqa lies southwest of Yawarqucha and northwest of Wakan Q'allay.
