= Acobambilla District =

Coordinates: 12.6671°S 75.3249°W

Acobambilla
- District
- Interactive map of Acobambilla
- Country: Peru
- Region: Huancavelica
- Province: Huancavelica
- Founded: April 30, 1936
- Capital: Acobambilla

Government
  - Mayor: Samuel Toralva Lazaro

Area
  - Total: 758.32 km^{2} (292.79 sq mi)
- Elevation: 3,795 m (12,451 ft)

Population (2005 census)
  - Total: 3,521
  - Density: 4.643/km^{2} (12.03/sq mi)
- Time zone: UTC-5 (PET)
- UBIGEO: 090102

Acobambilla District is one of nineteen districts of the Huancavelica Province in Peru.

== Geography ==
There are a couple of large lakes in the district like Anqasqucha, Astuqucha, Chiliqucha, Chunchuqucha, Kanllaqucha, Milluqucha, Papaqucha, Warmiqucha, and Ñawinqucha.

The Chunta mountain range traverses the district. Some of the highest peaks of the district are listed below:

- Anqasqucha
- Anta Q'asa
- Chuntani
- Huch'uy Anqas
- Inti Wañunan
- Kaywa
- Kunkayuq
- Llama Rumi
- Llantani
- Pilluni
- Pirwayuq
- Puka
- Puka Rumi
- Puka Urqu
- Qarwa Q'asa
- Qullpapata
- Qullpa Qaqa
- Sitaq
- Warmi Mach'ay
- Wasi Qaqa
- Wayllasqa
- Wayta
- Yanaqucha
- Yana Ranra
- Yawray
