= Antara (Peru) =

Mountain

- Location within Peru

Highest point
- Elevation: 4,957 m (16,263 ft)
- Coordinates: 13°18′43″S 74°50′26″W

Geography
- Location: Peru, Huancavelica Region
- Parent range: Andes

Antara (Quechua for a kind of pan flute) is a 4,957-metre-high (16,263 ft) mountain in the Andes of Peru. It is situated in the Huancavelica Region, Huaytará Province, Pilpichaca District. It lies southeast of Wakan Q'allay and Qispi Q'awa. The peaks northeast and northwest of Antara are named Willani and Q'illu Urqu.
