= Laramarca District =

Coordinates: 13.9485°S 75.0354°W

Laramarca Laramarka
- District
- Interactive map of Laramarca
- Country: Peru
- Region: Huancavelica
- Province: Huaytará
- Founded: January 22, 1942
- Capital: Laramarca

Area
  - Total: 205.05 km^{2} (79.17 sq mi)
- Elevation: 3,325 m (10,909 ft)

Population (2005 census)
  - Total: 1,845
  - Density: 8.998/km^{2} (23.30/sq mi)
- Time zone: UTC-5 (PET)
- UBIGEO: 090605

Laramarca District is one of sixteen districts of the province Huaytará in Peru. It is located in the southern part of the province next to Querco District.
