= Ñawinqucha (Huancavelica) =

Lake in Peru

- Location within Peru
- Location: Peru; Huancavelica Region
- Coordinates: 12°41′57″S 75°32′55″W
- Surface area: 139.50 ha (344.7 acres)

Ñawinqucha (Quechua ñawi eye; button hole, -n a suffix, qucha lake, hispanicized spellings Ñahuincocha, Ñahuin ccocha) is a lake in Peru located in the Huancavelica Region, Huancavelica Province, Acobambilla District. It lies west of Warmiqucha and south of Milluqucha.
