= Chuqi Warmi =

Mountain in Peru

- Location within Peru

Highest point
- Elevation: 5,049 m (16,565 ft)
- Coordinates: 13°15′07″S 75°10′34″W

Geography
- Location: Peru, Huancavelica Region
- Parent range: Andes

Chuqi Warmi (Aymara chuqi gold, warmi woman, Quechua chuqi precious metal, warmi woman, "gold (or metal) woman", Hispanicized spelling Choquehuarmi) or Chuki Warmi (Quechua chuki hard; sword; spear, lance, "hard (sword, spear or lance) woman") is a 5,049-metre-high (16,565 ft) mountain in the Andes of southern Peru. It is situated in the Huancavelica Region, Castrovirreyna Province, on the border of the districts of Castrovirreyna and Santa Ana, and in the Huaytará Province, Pilpichaca District. Chuqi Warmi lies south of the lake Urququcha, between Yuraq Pata in the northeast and Yana Ranra in the southwest.
