= Huayacundo Arma District =

Coordinates: 13.5340°S 75.3146°W

Huayacundo Arma Wayakuntu Arma
- District
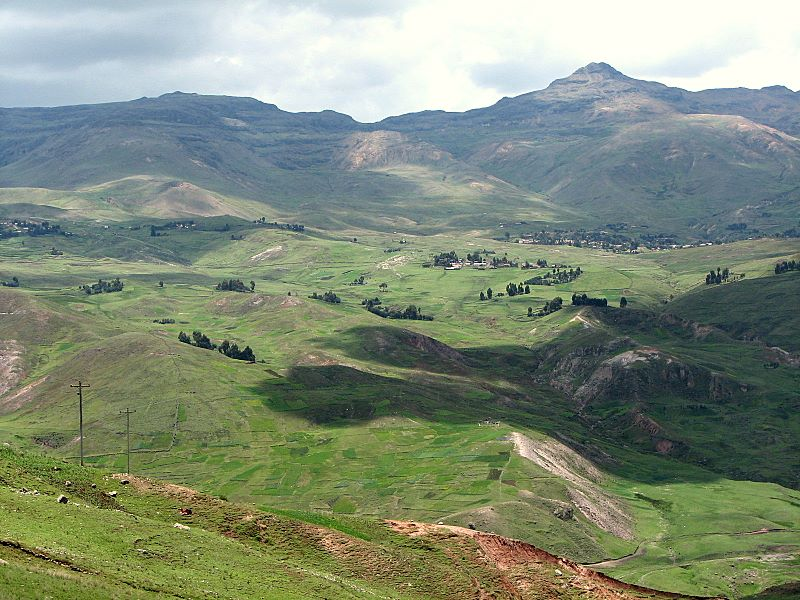
- Interactive map of Huayacundo Arma
- Country: Peru
- Region: Huancavelica
- Province: Huaytará
- Founded: February 9, 1962
- Capital: Huayacundo Arma

Area
  - Total: 12.81 km^{2} (4.95 sq mi)
- Elevation: 3,150 m (10,330 ft)

Population (2005 census)
  - Total: 448
  - Density: 35.0/km^{2} (90.6/sq mi)
- Time zone: UTC-5 (PET)
- UBIGEO: 090604

Huayacundo Arma District is one of sixteen districts of the province Huaytará in Peru.
