= San Francisco de Sangayaico District =

Coordinates: 13.7950°S 75.2490°W

San Francisco de Sangayaico
- District
- Interactive map of San Francisco de Sangayaico
- Country: Peru
- Region: Huancavelica
- Province: Huaytará
- Founded: January 26, 1956
- Capital: San Francisco de Sangayaico

Area
  - Total: 70.7 km^{2} (27.3 sq mi)
- Elevation: 3,380 m (11,090 ft)

Population (2005 census)
  - Total: 1,036
  - Density: 14.7/km^{2} (38.0/sq mi)
- Time zone: UTC-5 (PET)
- UBIGEO: 090611

San Francisco de Sangayaico District is one of sixteen districts of the province Huaytará in Peru.
