= Uña Paka =

Mountain in Peru

- Location within Peru

Highest point
- Elevation: 5,050 m (16,570 ft)
- Coordinates: 13°11′35″S 74°55′52″W

Naming
- Language of name: Quechua

Geography
- Location: Peru, Huancavelica Region, Huaytará Province
- Parent range: Andes

Uña Paka (Quechua uña little animal, paka eagle, "little eagle", Hispanicized spelling Uñapaca) is a mountain in the Huancavelica Region in Peru, about 5,050 m (16,570 ft) high. It is located in the Huancavelica Province, Huachocolpa District, and in the Huaytará Province, Pilpichaca District. It lies north of a little lake named Yanaqucha ("black lake").
