= Santo Domingo de Capillas District =

Coordinates: 13.7368°S 75.2437°W

Santo Domingo de Capillas
- District
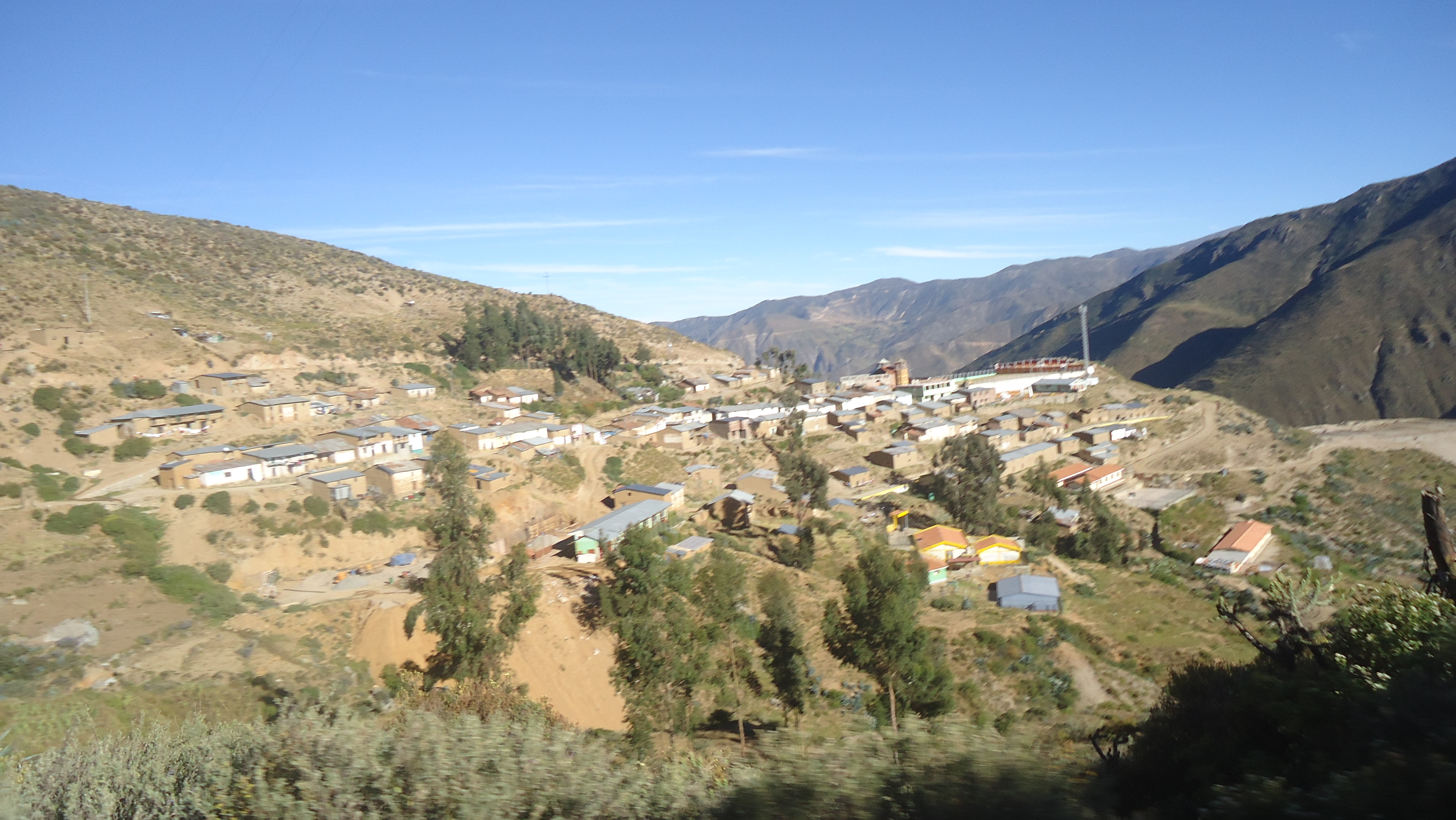
- Santo Domingo de Capillas
- Interactive map of Santo Domingo de Capillas
- Country: Peru
- Region: Huancavelica
- Province: Huaytará
- Founded: January 26, 1956
- Capital: Santo Domingo de Capillas

Area
  - Total: 248.56 km^{2} (95.97 sq mi)
- Elevation: 3,367 m (11,047 ft)

Population (2005 census)
  - Total: 1,024
  - Density: 4.120/km^{2} (10.67/sq mi)
- Time zone: UTC-5 (PET)
- UBIGEO: 090615

Santo Domingo de Capillas District is one of sixteen districts of the province Huaytará in Peru.
