= Santiago de Quirahuara District =

Coordinates: 14.0559°S 74.9765°W

Santiago de Quirahuara
- District
- Interactive map of Santiago de Quirahuara
- Country: Peru
- Region: Huancavelica
- Province: Huaytará
- Founded: January 26, 1956
- Capital: Santiago de Quirahuara

Area
  - Total: 169.32 km^{2} (65.37 sq mi)
- Elevation: 2,802 m (9,193 ft)

Population (2005 census)
  - Total: 819
  - Density: 4.84/km^{2} (12.5/sq mi)
- Time zone: UTC-5 (PET)
- UBIGEO: 090614

Santiago de Quirahuara District is one of sixteen districts of the province Huaytará in Peru.
