= Papaqucha =

Papaqucha may refer to:

- Papaqucha (Huancavelica), a lake in Peru
- Papaqucha (Lima), a lake in Peru
