= Yana Ranra (Huancavelica) =

Mountain in Peru

- Location within Peru

Highest point
- Elevation: 4,800 m (15,700 ft)
- Coordinates: 13°15′40″S 75°10′35″W

Geography
- Location: Peru, Huancavelica Region
- Parent range: Andes

Yana Ranra (Quechua yana black, ranra stony; stony ground, "black stony ground", also spelled Yanarangra) is a mountain in the Andes of Peru, about 4,800 metres (15,748 ft) high. It is situated in the Huancavelica Region, Castrovirreyna Province, on the border of the districts of Castrovirreyna and Santa Ana. Chuqi Warmi lies south of the lake Urququcha, southwest of Yuraq Pata and Chuqi Warmi, and southeast of Runa Wañusqa Urqu.
