= Papaqucha (Huancavelica) =

Lake in Peru

- Location within Peru
- Location: Peru; Huancavelica Region
- Coordinates: 12°44′02″S 75°31′24″W

Papaqucha (Quechua papa potato, qucha lake, "potato lake", Hispanicized spelling Papacocha) is a lake in Peru located in the Huancavelica Region, Huancavelica Province, Acobambilla District. It lies south of Warmiqucha.
