= Runayoc =

Archaeological site in Peru

Runayuq
- Location: Peru
- Region: Huancavelica Region, Huaytará Province

Site notes
- Height: 3,400 m (11,200 ft)

Runayoc (possibly from Quechua runa person, -yuq a suffix) is an archaeological site in Peru on a mountain of that name. It is situated in the Huancavelica Region, Huaytará Province, Huaytará District. The ruins of Runayuq are situated at a height of about 3,400 m (11,200 ft).
