= Pilpichaca District =

Coordinates: 13.3302°S 74.9770°W

Pilpichaca Pillpichaka
- District
- Interactive map of Pilpichaca
- Country: Peru
- Region: Huancavelica
- Province: Huaytará
- Capital: Pilpichaca

Area
  - Total: 2,162.92 km^{2} (835.11 sq mi)
- Elevation: 4,092 m (13,425 ft)

Population (2005 census)
  - Total: 5,410
  - Density: 2.50/km^{2} (6.48/sq mi)
- Time zone: UTC-5 (PET)
- UBIGEO: 090607

Pilpichaca District is one of sixteen districts of the province Huaytará in Peru.

== Geography ==
Some of the highest mountains of the district are listed below:

- Anta Maqana
- Anqasqucha
- Antara
- Aqu Q'asa
- Aqu Urqu
- Artisayuq
- Chuqi Warmi
- Chuqllu Punta
- Ch'uspi
- Hatun P'ukru
- Hatun Rumi
- Hatun Surayuq
- Hatun Urqu
- Hatun Waraqu
- Hatun Wasi
- Inti Watana
- Kawituchayuq
- Machu Qichqa
- K'uchu Urqu
- Llipllina
- Muyuq Urqu
- Pachasniyuq
- Pata Wasi
- Pilluni
- Puka Q'asa
- Puka Urqu
- Puma Ranra
- Phutunqu
- P'unqu Qaqa
- Qispi Q'awa
- Qucha Urqu
- Qulluta
- Q'illu Kancha
- Q'illu Punta
- Q'illu Urqu
- Sura Wasi
- Tuku Pukyu
- Uma Kunka
- Uña Paka
- Uska Maska
- Wakan Q'allay
- Walla Q'asa
- Wamanripayuq
- Wisk'acha
- Yana Ranra
- Yana Urqu
- Yawarqucha (Huancavelica)
- Yawarqucha (Huaytará)
- Yuraq Kancha
- Yuraq Tampu
- Yuraq Urqu

== Climate ==
Climate data for Tunel Cero, Pilpichaca, elevation 4,512 m (14,803 ft), (1991–2020)
Month	Jan	Feb	Mar	Apr	May	Jun	Jul	Aug	Sep	Oct	Nov	Dec	Year
Mean daily maximum °C (°F)	10.4 (50.7)	10.1 (50.2)	10.1 (50.2)	10.7 (51.3)	10.8 (51.4)	10.8 (51.4)	10.5 (50.9)	11.1 (52.0)	11.3 (52.3)	11.6 (52.9)	12.2 (54.0)	10.9 (51.6)	10.9 (51.6)
Mean daily minimum °C (°F)	0.4 (32.7)	0.8 (33.4)	0.8 (33.4)	0.1 (32.2)	−1.9 (28.6)	−4.0 (24.8)	−4.9 (23.2)	−4.8 (23.4)	−3.1 (26.4)	−1.9 (28.6)	−1.4 (29.5)	−0.2 (31.6)	−1.7 (29.0)
Average precipitation mm (inches)	151.7 (5.97)	155.2 (6.11)	145.6 (5.73)	64.8 (2.55)	17.3 (0.68)	4.0 (0.16)	4.2 (0.17)	6.5 (0.26)	19.9 (0.78)	50.7 (2.00)	57.5 (2.26)	119.8 (4.72)	797.2 (31.39)
Source: National Meteorology and Hydrology Service of Peru

== See also ==
- Challwamayu
- Chuqlluqucha
- Q'araqucha
- Urququcha
