= Querco =

Querco may refer to:

- Querco, Peru, a town, capital city of the Querco District, a district of the Huaytará province in Peru
- Nonconvex great rhombicuboctahedron
