= Quito-Arma District =

Coordinates: 13.5285°S 75.3276°W

Quito-Arma Kitu Arma
- District
- Interactive map of Quito-Arma
- Country: Peru
- Region: Huancavelica
- Province: Huaytará
- Founded: July 25, 1955
- Capital: Quito-Arma

Area
  - Total: 222.32 km^{2} (85.84 sq mi)
- Elevation: 2,956 m (9,698 ft)

Population (2005 census)
  - Total: 907
  - Density: 4.08/km^{2} (10.6/sq mi)
- Time zone: UTC-5 (PET)
- UBIGEO: 090609

Quito-Arma District is one of sixteen districts of the province Huaytará in Peru.

== See also ==
- Wiraqucha Pirqa
