= Santiago de Chocorvos District =

Coordinates: 13.8253°S 75.2577°W

Santiago de Chocorvos
- District
- Interactive map of Santiago de Chocorvos
- Country: Peru
- Region: Huancavelica
- Province: Huaytará
- Capital: Santiago de Chocorvos

Area
  - Total: 1,150.2 km^{2} (444.1 sq mi)
- Elevation: 2,571 m (8,435 ft)

Population (2005 census)
  - Total: 3,892
  - Density: 3.384/km^{2} (8.764/sq mi)
- Time zone: UTC-5 (PET)
- UBIGEO: 090613

Santiago de Chocorvos District is one of the sixteen districts of the Huaytará province in Peru.

== Geography ==
One of the highest peaks of the district is Aqu Q'asa at approximately 4,400 m (14,400 ft). Other mountains are listed below:

- Anta Rumi
- Aqu Q'asa
- Atuq Wachanan
- Chuqi
- Ch'illwa
- Hatun P'ukru
- Hatun Urqu
- Kapillachayuq
- Kuntur Q'asa
- K'ark'a Pata
- Pallanka
- Pata Wasi
- Puka Kancha
- Puka Puka
- Puka Q'asa
- Pukllay
- Phiruruyuq
- P'ukru Pata
- Quri Kusma
- Q'illu K'uchu
- Ranra
- Rayusqa Pampa
- Saywa Rumi
- Silla Pata
- Silla Q'asa
- Ukhu Raqra
- Wamanicha Punta
- Wayllaniyuq
- Yana Mach'ay
- Yana Sirk'a
- Yuraq Qaqa

== Climate ==
Climate data for Santiago de Chocorvos, elevation 2,700 m (8,900 ft), (1991–2020)
Month	Jan	Feb	Mar	Apr	May	Jun	Jul	Aug	Sep	Oct	Nov	Dec	Year
Mean daily maximum °C (°F)	19.8 (67.6)	19.1 (66.4)	19.5 (67.1)	20.8 (69.4)	21.7 (71.1)	21.7 (71.1)	21.7 (71.1)	21.8 (71.2)	21.8 (71.2)	21.3 (70.3)	20.8 (69.4)	20.2 (68.4)	20.9 (69.5)
Mean daily minimum °C (°F)	10.5 (50.9)	10.4 (50.7)	10.4 (50.7)	10.1 (50.2)	10.0 (50.0)	10.0 (50.0)	10.0 (50.0)	10.1 (50.2)	10.3 (50.5)	10.3 (50.5)	9.9 (49.8)	10.4 (50.7)	10.2 (50.4)
Average precipitation mm (inches)	58.4 (2.30)	70.2 (2.76)	64.3 (2.53)	12.5 (0.49)	0.4 (0.02)	0.0 (0.0)	0.1 (0.00)	0.5 (0.02)	0.4 (0.02)	1.4 (0.06)	2.4 (0.09)	14.0 (0.55)	224.6 (8.84)
Source: National Meteorology and Hydrology Service of Peru
