= Uma Kunka =

Mountain in Peru

- Location within Peru

Highest point
- Elevation: 5,000 m (16,000 ft)
- Coordinates: 13°13′47″S 74°55′36″W

Naming
- Language of name: Quechua

Geography
- Location: Peru, Huancavelica Region, Huaytará Province
- Parent range: Andes

Uma Kunka (Quechua uma mountain top; head, kunka throat, Hispanicized spelling Umacunca) is a mountain in the Huancavelica Region in Peru, about 5,000 m (16,000 ft) high. It is located in the Huaytará Province, in the north of the Pilpichaca District. It lies south of a little lake named Yanaqucha ("black lake").
