= Anta Maqana =

Mountain in Peru

- Location within Peru

Highest point
- Elevation: 4,880 m (16,010 ft)
- Coordinates: 13°15′44″S 74°56′04″W

Naming
- Language of name: Quechua

Geography
- Location: Peru, Huancavelica Region, Huaytará Province
- Parent range: Andes

Anta Maqana (Quechua anta copper, maqana club, "copper club", Hispanicized spelling Antamajana) is a 4,880-metre-high (16,010 ft) mountain in the Huancavelica Region in Peru. It is located in the Huaytará Province, Pilpichaca District.
