= Yawarqucha (Huancavelica) =

Mountain in Peru

- Location within Peru

Highest point
- Elevation: 5,100 m (16,700 ft)
- Coordinates: 13°08′32″S 74°59′20″W

Naming
- Language of name: Quechua

Geography
- Location: Peru, Huancavelica Region
- Parent range: Andes

Yawarqucha (Quechua yawar blood, qucha, lake, "blood lake", Hispanicized spelling Yahuarcocha) is a mountain in the Huancavelica Region in Peru, about 5,100 metres (16,732 ft) high. It is situated in the Castrovirreyna Province, Santa Ana District, in the Huancavelica Province, Huachocolpa District, and in the Huaytará Province, Pilpichaca District. Yawarqucha lies north-east of the lake Chuqlluqucha.
