= Ñawinqucha =

Ñawinqucha (Quechua ñawi eye; button hole, -n a suffix, qucha lake, "eye (or button hole) lake", Hispanicized spellings Nahuinccocha, Nahuincocha, Ñahuinccocha, Ñahuincocha) may refer to:

- Ñawinqucha (Huancavelica), a lake in the Huancavelica Region, Peru
- Ñawinqucha (Jauja), a lake with a dam of that name in the Jauja Province, Junín Region, Peru
- Ñawinqucha (Junín), a lake in the Huancayo Province, Junín Region, Peru
