= Ccuelluccasa =

Human settlement in Peru

Coordinates: 13°57′58″S 075°05′09″W

Ccuelluccasa is a populated place in Huancavelica Region, Peru.

== See also ==
- Huaytará
