= Tambo District =

Tambo District may refer to:

- Tambo District, Huaytará, Peru
- Tambo District, La Mar, Peru
- Tambo de Mora District, Chincha province, Peru
- Tambo Grande District, Piura province, Peru
- Río Tambo District, Satipo province, Peru
