= San Antonio de Cusicancha District =

Coordinates: 13.5025°S 75.2936°W

San Antonio de Cusicancha Kusikancha
- District
- Interactive map of San Antonio de Cusicancha
- Country: Peru
- Region: Huancavelica
- Province: Huaytará
- Founded: June 14, 1962
- Capital: Cusicancha

Area
  - Total: 255.86 km^{2} (98.79 sq mi)
- Elevation: 3,228 m (10,591 ft)

Population (2005 census)
  - Total: 2,138
  - Density: 8.356/km^{2} (21.64/sq mi)
- Time zone: UTC-5 (PET)
- UBIGEO: 090610

San Antonio de Cusicancha District is one of sixteen districts of the province Huaytará in Peru.

== Climate ==
Climate data for Cusicancha, elevation 3,263 m (10,705 ft), (1991–2020)
Month	Jan	Feb	Mar	Apr	May	Jun	Jul	Aug	Sep	Oct	Nov	Dec	Year
Mean daily maximum °C (°F)	18.4 (65.1)	17.5 (63.5)	17.5 (63.5)	18.2 (64.8)	18.7 (65.7)	18.7 (65.7)	18.5 (65.3)	18.8 (65.8)	19.2 (66.6)	19.3 (66.7)	19.2 (66.6)	18.4 (65.1)	18.5 (65.4)
Mean daily minimum °C (°F)	7.8 (46.0)	7.7 (45.9)	8.0 (46.4)	7.7 (45.9)	7.6 (45.7)	7.4 (45.3)	6.8 (44.2)	7.0 (44.6)	7.2 (45.0)	7.4 (45.3)	7.4 (45.3)	7.8 (46.0)	7.5 (45.5)
Average precipitation mm (inches)	90.2 (3.55)	96.1 (3.78)	102.1 (4.02)	38.1 (1.50)	2.3 (0.09)	0.1 (0.00)	0.0 (0.0)	0.3 (0.01)	3.5 (0.14)	7.2 (0.28)	12.9 (0.51)	43.2 (1.70)	396 (15.58)
Source: National Meteorology and Hydrology Service of Peru
