= Yawarqucha (Huaytará) =

Mountain in Peru

- Location within Peru

Highest point
- Elevation: 5,035 m (16,519 ft)
- Coordinates: 13°14′21″S 74°47′58″W

Geography
- Location: Peru, Huancavelica Region
- Parent range: Andes

Yawarqucha (Quechua yawar blood, qucha lake, "blood lake", Hispanicized spelling Yahuarcocha) is a 5,035-metre-high (16,519 ft) mountain in the Andes of Peru. It is situated in the Huancavelica Region, Huaytará Province, Pilpichaca District. Yawarqucha lies north of Wakan Q'allay.
