= Challwamayu =

Challwamayu may refer to:

- Challwamayu (Huancavelica), a river in Peru
- Challwamayu (Junín), a river in Peru
