= Pachasniyuq =

Mountain in Peru

- Location within Peru

Highest point
- Elevation: 4,800 m (15,700 ft)
- Coordinates: 13°15′25″S 74°44′19″W

Naming
- Language of name: Quechua

Geography
- Location: Peru, Huancavelica Region, Huaytará Province
- Parent range: Andes

Pachasniyuq (Quechua pachas gypsum, -ni, -yuq suffixes, "the one with gypsum", Hispanicized spelling Pachasnioc) is a mountain in the Huancavelica Region in Peru, about 4,800 metres (15,748 ft) high. It is situated in the Huaytará Province, in the west of the Pilpichaca District. Pachasniyuq lies southwest of Walla Q'asa and southeast of K'uchu Urqu.
