= San Isidro District, Huaytará =

Coordinates: 13.9565°S 75.2386°W

San Isidro District
- District
- Interactive map of San Isidro District
- Country: Peru
- Region: Huancavelica
- Province: Huaytará
- Founded: July 25, 1955
- Capital: San Juan de Huirpacancha

Area
  - Total: 174.95 km^{2} (67.55 sq mi)
- Elevation: 3,679 m (12,070 ft)

Population (2017)
  - Total: 1,054
  - Density: 6.025/km^{2} (15.60/sq mi)
- Time zone: UTC-5 (PET)
- UBIGEO: 090612

San Isidro District is one of sixteen districts of the province Huaytará in Peru.
