= Challwa Mayu =

Challwa Mayu (Quechua for "fish river") may refer to:

== Rivers ==
- Challwamayu (Huancavelica), a river in the Huancavelica Region in Peru
- Challwamayu (Junín), a river in the Junín Region in Peru

== Place ==
- Challwa Mayu, Bolivia, a place in Bolivia
