= Ccotanca =

Human settlement in Peru

Coordinates: 13°38′31″S 075°23′06″W

Ccotanca or Ccotancca is a populated place in Huancavelica Region, Peru.

== See also ==
- Huaytará
