= Lake Caracocha =

Caracocha Dam
- Location within Peru
- Country: Peru
- Location: Huancavelica Region, Huaytará Province
- Coordinates: 13°21′49.2″S 75°05′25.3″W

Dam and spillways
- Height: 13 m (43 ft)
- Length: 635 m (2,083 ft)

Reservoir
- Creates: Lake Caracocha
- Total capacity: 40,000,000 m^{3} (32,000 acre⋅ft)
- Normal elevation: 4,528 m (14,856 ft)

Power Station
- Operator: INADE

Lake Caracocha or Lake Ccaraccocha (both possibly from Quechua q'ara naked, bald, unpopulated, qucha lake) is a lake in Peru located in the Huancavelica Region, Huaytará Province, Pilpichaca District. It is situated at a height of about 4,528 metres (14,856 ft). Caracocha lies south of the lakes named Choclococha and Orcococha.

The Caracocha dam was erected in 2000. It is 635 m (2,083 ft) long and 13 m (14 yd) tall. It is operated by INADE. The reservoir has a capacity of 40,000,000 m^{3} (32,000 acre⋅ft).
