= Huaytará District =

Coordinates: 13.6044°S 75.3532°W

Huaytará Waytara
- District
- Interactive map of Huaytará
- Country: Peru
- Region: Huancavelica
- Province: Huaytará
- Capital: Huaytará

Area
  - Total: 401.25 km^{2} (154.92 sq mi)
- Elevation: 2,658 m (8,720 ft)

Population (2005 census)
  - Total: 2,435
  - Density: 6.069/km^{2} (15.72/sq mi)
- Time zone: UTC-5 (PET)
- UBIGEO: 090601

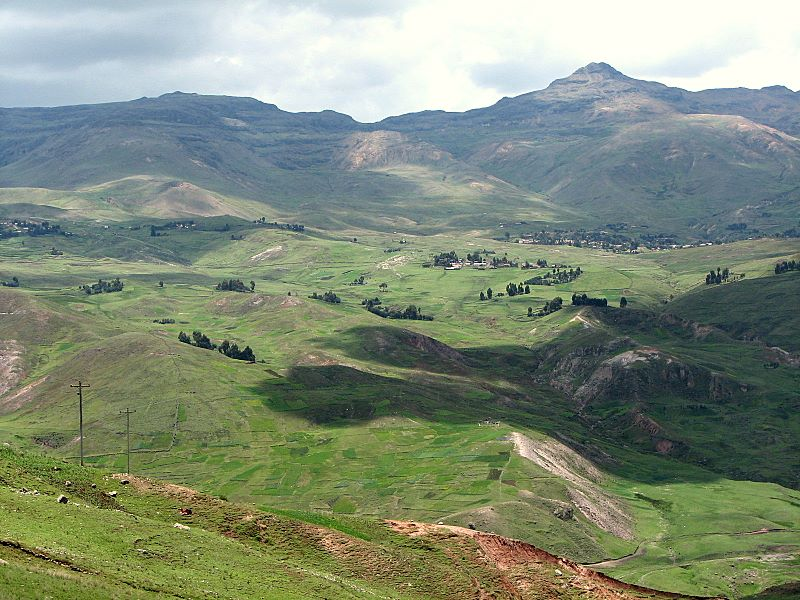
The landscape of Huancavelica.

Huaytará District is one of sixteen districts in Huaytará Province, Peru. Its seat is Huaytará.

== See also ==
- Inka Wasi
- Runayuq
