= Llipllina =

Mountain in Peru

- Location within Peru

Highest point
- Elevation: 5,050 m (16,570 ft)
- Coordinates: 13°10′54″S 74°54′38″W

Naming
- Language of name: Quechua

Geography
- Location: Peru, Huancavelica Region, Huaytará Province
- Parent range: Andes

Llipllina (Quechua lliplliy to sparkle, glimmer, -na a suffix) is a mountain in the Huancavelica Region in Peru, about 5,050 m (16,570 ft) high. It is located in the Huancavelica Province, Huachocolpa District, and in the Huaytará Province, Pilpichaca District. Llipllina lies south of Yana Chuku.
