= Ocoyo District =

Coordinates: 14.0082°S 75.0225°W

Ocoyo
- District
- Interactive map of Ocoyo
- Country: Peru
- Region: Huancavelica
- Province: Huaytará
- Founded: September 6, 1920
- Capital: Ocoyo

Area
  - Total: 154.71 km^{2} (59.73 sq mi)
- Elevation: 1,950 m (6,400 ft)

Population (2005 census)
  - Total: 1,462
  - Density: 9.450/km^{2} (24.48/sq mi)
- Time zone: UTC-5 (PET)
- UBIGEO: 090606

Ocoyo District is one of sixteen districts of the province Huaytará in Peru.
