= Aros River =

- Native name: Río Aros (Spanish)

Location
- Country: Mexico
- State: Sonora

The Aros River is a river in the northern Mexican state of Sonora. It is the largest tributary of the Yaqui river, and is the largest free flowing river in western Mexico. Its headwaters are in the Sierra Madre Occidental. The Yaqui river begins at the confluence between the Aros and Bivaspe rivers. The rugged terrain surrounding the river means it is most easily accessible by boat.

== Wildlife ==
Large portions of the Aros river are included in the Northern Jaguar reserve, which supports the northernmost breeding jaguar population. Other examples of species that dwell in the river basin include military macaws, spotted box turtles, desert pocket mice, and Tarahumara salamanders.

== See also ==
- List of rivers of Mexico
