= Qulluta (Huancavelica) =

Mountain in Peru

- Location within Peru

Highest point
- Elevation: 4,908 m (16,102 ft)
- Coordinates: 13°15′21″S 74°53′42″W

Geography
- Location: Peru, Huancavelica Region
- Parent range: Andes

Qulluta (Quechua for mortar, also spelled Jollota) is a 4,908 m (16,102 ft) mountain in the Andes of Peru high. It is situated in the Huancavelica Region, Huaytará Province, Pilpichaca District. Qulluta lies west of the Pukamayu ("red river"), a right affluent of the Pampas River.
