= Wasi Qaqa =

Mountain in Peru

- Location within Peru

Highest point
- Elevation: 4,800 m (15,700 ft)
- Coordinates: 12°45′07″S 75°23′36″W

Geography
- Location: Peru, Huancavelica Region
- Parent range: Andes

Wasi Qaqa (Quechua wasi house, qaqa rock, "house rock", Hispanicized spelling Huasijaja) is a mountain in the Andes of Peru, about 4,800 m (15,748 ft) high. It is situated in the Huancavelica Region, Huancavelica Province, Acobambilla District. Wasi Qaqa lies north of Wayllasqa.
