= Ayaví District =

Coordinates: 13.7029°S 75.3509°W

Ayaví
- District
- Interactive map of Ayaví
- Country: Peru
- Region: Huancavelica
- Province: Huaytará
- Founded: January 22, 1941
- Capital: Ayaví

Area
  - Total: 201.26 km^{2} (77.71 sq mi)
- Elevation: 3,758 m (12,329 ft)

Population (2005 census)
  - Total: 1,212
  - Density: 6.022/km^{2} (15.60/sq mi)
- Time zone: UTC-5 (PET)
- UBIGEO: 090602

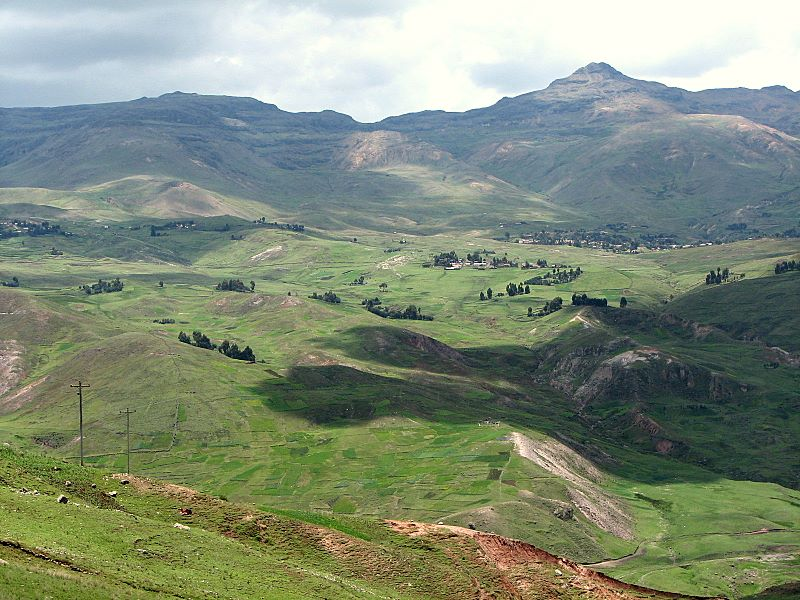

Ayaví District is one of sixteen districts of the province Huaytará in Peru.
