= Wiraqucha Pirqa =

Archaeological site in Peru

- Location within Peru
- 13.5307°S 75.3456°W
- Location: Peru
- Region: Huancavelica Region, Huaytara Province, Quito-Arma District

Site notes
- Height: 3,781 metres (12,405 ft)

Wiraqucha Pirqa (Quechua "wall of Viracocha") is an archaeological site in Peru. It is located in the Huancavelica Region, Huaytara Province, Quito-Arma District, at a height of 3,781 metres (12,405 ft). There is a little pre-Hispanic town and a stone forest containing caves with cave paintings.

== See also ==
- Inka Wasi
