= Hatun Urqu (Huancavelica) =

Mountain in Peru

- Location within Peru

Highest point
- Elevation: 4,900 m (16,100 ft)
- Coordinates: 13°20′40″S 74°43′20″W

Naming
- Language of name: Quechua

Geography
- Location: Peru, Huancavelica Region, Huaytará Province
- Parent range: Andes

Hatun Urqu (Quechua hatun big, urqu, mountain, "big mountain", Hispanicized spelling Jatunorcco) is a mountain in the Huancavelica Region in Peru, about 4,900 metres (16,076 ft) high. It is situated in the Huaytará Province, in the west of the Pilpichaca District. Hatun Urqu lies south of the mountain Yana Urqu ("black mountain", Hispanicized Yanaorcco). Between these mountains there is an intermittent stream. It flows to the river Qullpamach'ay ("salpeter cave", Jollpamachay) south of Hatun Urqu.
