= Northern Jaguar Reserve =

Nature reserve in Mexico

- Location within Mexico Location within Sonora
- Location: Sonora, Mexico
- Coordinates: 29°28′00″N 109°10′00″W
- Area: 222 km^{2} (86 sq mi)

The Northern Jaguar Reserve is a nature reserve at the foothills of the Sierra Madre in Sonora, Northern Mexico. It was established mainly to protect the northernmost population of the jaguar.

== Location and vegetation ==
The reserve is situated between the Ríos Aros and Bavispe. It covers a total area of about 222 km^{2} (86 sq mi). The vegetation consists of bushland, which covers the slopes and valleys of the reserve. Human population is very low. Access to the remote area is only possible by rugged single-track dirt road, which ends dead in the reserve.

== Wildlife ==
The reserve was mainly established to protect the jaguar, which is still found in the reserve. In addition, the reserve is home to three other cat species: the puma, bobcat and ocelot. Important prey species of the large cats are the white-tailed deer and javelinas.

There are 215 species of bird in the reserve, which include typical neotropical species, like the military macaw and typical North American species such as the bald eagle, which has its southern range limit here.

== See also ==
- Central America
