= Tambo District, Huaytará =

Coordinates: 13.6895°S 75.2747°W

Tambo Tampu
- District
- Interactive map of Tambo
- Country: Peru
- Region: Huancavelica
- Province: Huaytará
- Founded: January 12, 1921
- Capital: Tambo

Area
  - Total: 226.58 km^{2} (87.48 sq mi)
- Elevation: 3,141 m (10,305 ft)

Population (2005 census)
  - Total: 1,224
  - Density: 5.402/km^{2} (13.99/sq mi)
- Time zone: UTC-5 (PET)
- UBIGEO: 090616

Tambo District is one of sixteen districts of the province Huaytará in Peru.
