= Querco District =

Coordinates: 13.9795°S 74.9768°W

Querco
- District
- Interactive map of Querco
- Country: Peru
- Region: Huancavelica
- Province: Huaytará
- Founded: January 5, 1945
- Capital: Querco

Area
  - Total: 697.31 km^{2} (269.23 sq mi)
- Elevation: 2,858 m (9,377 ft)

Population (2005 census)
  - Total: 1,081
  - Density: 1.550/km^{2} (4.015/sq mi)
- Time zone: UTC-5 (PET)
- UBIGEO: 090608

Querco District is one of sixteen districts of the Huaytará Province in Peru.

== Geography ==
One of the highest peaks of the district is Yana Urqu at approximately 4,400 m (14,400 ft). Other mountains are listed below:

- Anta Qaqa
- Chiri Mach'ay
- Chuntani
- Hatun Qiñwa
- Hatun Wakcha
- Hatun Waraqu
- Khuchi Puñunan
- Llullu Chuku
- Minasniyuq
- Misk'i Yaku
- Parya
- Pata Kancha
- Puka Kancha
- Puka Urqu
- Pukara Marka
- Punta Sura
- Qullpa Uqhu
- Qunupa
- Qhawana
- Q'ara Pata
- Ranra Kancha
- Rumi Pallana
- Saywa Kancha
- Sura Kancha
- Tuqtu Qucha
- Uqsa
- Utuluyuq
- Wachwalla
- Wank'a Qaqa
- Wawqu
- Wayllaniyuq
- Wayta Pallana
- Wintu
- Yana Q'asa
- Yana Ranra
- Yana Urqu
- Yuraq Qaqa
