= Jaguar =

Jaguar Temporal range: Early Pleistocene – present (~850,000–0 YBP)

Conservation status
- Near Threatened (IUCN 3.1)
- CITES Appendix I

Scientific classification
- Kingdom: Animalia
- Phylum: Chordata
- Class: Mammalia
- Order: Carnivora
- Family: Felidae
- Genus: Panthera
- Species: P. onca

Binomial name
- Panthera onca (Linnaeus, 1758)

Subspecies
- Panthera onca onca; †Panthera onca augusta; †Panthera onca mesembrina
- Current range Former range

Synonyms
- Felis augustus (Leidy, 1872); Felis listai (Roth, 1899); Felis onca Linnaeus, 1758; Felis onca subsp. boliviensis Nelson & Goldman, 1933; Felis onca subsp. coxi Nelson & Goldman, 1933; Felis onca subsp. ucayalae Nelson & Goldman, 1933; Felis veronis Hay, 1919; Iemish listai (Roth, 1899); Panthera augusta (Leidy, 1872); Panthera onca subsp. augusta (Leidy, 1872); Uncia augusta (Leidy, 1872)

Large cat native to the Americas

The jaguar (Panthera onca) is a large cat species and the only living member of the genus Panthera that is native to the Americas. Its coat features pale yellow to tan colored fur covered with spots that transition to rosettes on the sides; some individuals have a melanistic spotted coat. With a body length of up to 1.85 m (6 ft 1 in) and a weight of up to 158 kg (348 lb), it is the biggest cat species in the Americas and the third largest in the world. The jaguar's powerful bite allows it to pierce the carapaces of turtles and tortoises, and to employ an unusual killing method: it bites directly through the skull of mammalian prey between the ears to deliver a fatal blow to the brain.

The modern jaguar's ancestors probably entered the Americas from Eurasia during the Early Pleistocene via the land bridge that once spanned the Bering Strait. The oldest jaguar fossils found in North America date to between 0.85 to 0.82 million years ago. Today, the jaguar's range extends from the Southwestern United States across Mexico and much of Central America, the Amazon rainforest and south to Paraguay and northern Argentina. It inhabits a variety of forested and open terrains, but its preferred habitat is tropical and subtropical moist broadleaf forest, wetlands and wooded regions. It is adept at swimming and is largely a solitary, opportunistic, stalk-and-ambush apex predator. As a keystone species, it plays an important role in stabilizing ecosystems and in regulating prey populations.

The jaguar is threatened by habitat loss, habitat fragmentation, poaching for trade with its body parts and killings in human–wildlife conflict situations, particularly with ranchers in Central and South America. It has been listed as Near Threatened on the IUCN Red List since 2002. The wild population is thought to have declined since the late 1990s. Priority areas for jaguar conservation comprise 51 large areas inhabited by at least 50 breeding individuals, called Jaguar Conservation Units. They are located in 36 geographic regions from Mexico to Argentina.

The jaguar has featured prominently in the mythology of Indigenous peoples of the Americas, including those of the Aztec and Maya civilizations.

== Etymology ==
The word "jaguar" is possibly derived from the Tupi-Guarani word yaguara meaning 'wild beast that overcomes its prey at a bound'. Because jaguar also applies to other animals, Indigenous peoples in Guyana call it jaguareté, with the added suffix eté, meaning "true beast". "Onca" is derived from the Portuguese name onça for a spotted cat that is larger than a lynx; cf. ounce. The word "panther" is derived from classical Latin panthēra, itself from the ancient Greek πάνθηρ (pánthēr).

In North America, the word is pronounced with two syllables, as /ˈdʒæɡwɑːr/, while in British English, it is pronounced with three, as /ˈdʒæɡjuːər/.

== Taxonomy and evolution ==
=== Taxonomy ===
In 1758, Carl Linnaeus described the jaguar in his work Systema Naturae and gave it the scientific name Felis onca.

In the 19th and 20th centuries, several jaguar type specimens formed the basis for descriptions of subspecies. In 1939, Reginald Innes Pocock recognized eight subspecies based on the geographic origins and skull morphology of these specimens. Pocock did not have access to sufficient zoological specimens to critically evaluate their subspecific status but expressed doubt about the status of several. Later consideration of his work suggested only three subspecies should be recognized. The description of P. o. palustris was based on a fossil skull.

By 2005, nine subspecies were considered to be valid taxa:

- P. o. onca (Linnaeus, 1758) the type specimen was a jaguar from Brazil.
- P. o. peruviana (De Blainville, 1843) the type specimen was a jaguar skull from Peru.
- P. o. hernandesii (Gray, 1857) the type specimen was a jaguar from Mazatlán in Mexico.
- P. o. palustris (Ameghino, 1888) the type specimen was a fossil jaguar mandible excavated in the Sierras Pampeanas of Córdova District, Argentina.
- P. o. centralis (Mearns, 1901) the type specimen was a skull of a male jaguar from Talamanca, Costa Rica.
- P. o. goldmani (Mearns, 1901) the type specimen was a jaguar skin from Yohatlan in Campeche, Mexico.
- P. o. paraguensis (Hollister, 1914) the type specimen was a skull of a male jaguar from Paraguay.
- P. o. arizonensis (Goldman, 1932) the type specimen was a skin and skull of a male jaguar from the vicinity of Cibecue, Arizona.
- P. o. veraecrucis (Nelson and Goldman, 1933) the type specimen was a skull of a male jaguar from San Andrés Tuxtla in Mexico.

Reginald Innes Pocock placed the jaguar in the genus Panthera and observed that it shares several morphological features with the leopard (P. pardus). He, therefore, concluded that they are most closely related to each other. Results of morphological and genetic research indicate a clinal north–south variation between populations, but no evidence for subspecific differentiation. DNA analysis of 84 jaguar samples from South America revealed that the gene flow between jaguar populations in Colombia was high in the past. Since 2017, the jaguar is considered to be a monotypic taxon, though the modern Panthera onca onca is still distinguished from two fossil subspecies, Panthera onca augusta and Panthera onca mesembrina. However, the 2024 study suggested that the validity of subspecific assignments on both P. o. augusta and P. o. mesembrina remains unresolved, since both fossil and living jaguars show a considerable variation in morphometry.

=== Evolution ===
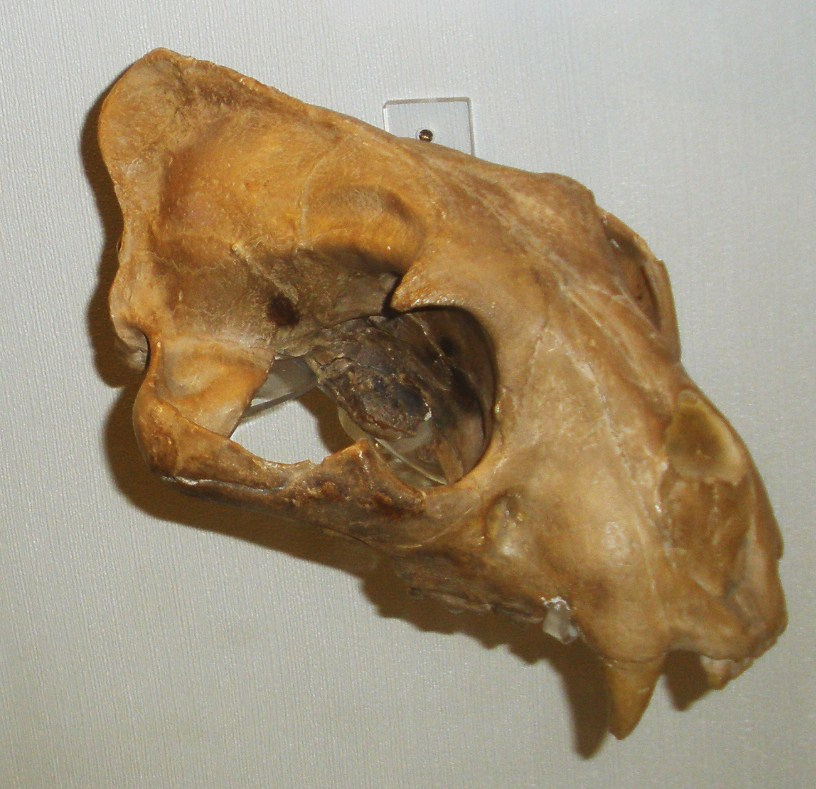
Fossil skull of P. o. augusta

The Panthera lineage is estimated to have genetically diverged from the common ancestor of the Felidae around 9.32 to 4.47 million years ago to 11.75 to 0.97 million years ago. Some genetic analyses place the jaguar as a sister species to the lion with which it diverged 3.46 to 1.22 million years ago, but other studies place the lion closer to the leopard.

The lineage of the jaguar appears to have originated in Africa and spread to Eurasia 1.95–1.77 mya. The living jaguar species is often suggested to have descended from the Eurasian Panthera gombaszogensis. The ancestor of the jaguar entered the American continent via Beringia, the land bridge that once spanned the Bering Strait, Some authors have disputed the close relationship between P. gombaszogensis (which is primarily known from Eurasia) and the modern jaguar. The oldest fossils of modern jaguars (P. onca) have been found in North America dating between 850,000-820,000 years ago. Results of mitochondrial DNA analysis of 37 jaguars indicate that current populations evolved between 510,000 and 280,000 years ago in northern South America and subsequently recolonized North and Central America after the extinction of jaguars there during the Late Pleistocene.

Two extinct subspecies of jaguar are recognized in the fossil record: the North American P. o. augusta and South American P. o. mesembrina.

The oldest jaguar fossil from the rancholabrean age has been estimated to be 38,600 years old and was excavated at Oregon Caves National Monument and Preserve.

Phylogenetic relationships of the jaguar as derived through analysis of

nuclear DNA:

- Felidae
  - Felinae
  - Pantherinae
    - Panthera
      - - - Lion (P. leo)
          - Jaguar
        - Leopard (P. pardus)
      - - Tiger (P. tigris)
        - Snow leopard (P. uncia)
    - Neofelis

mitochondrial DNA:

- Felidae
  - Felinae
  - Pantherinae
    - Panthera
      - - - - Lion
            - Leopard
          - Snow leopard
        - Jaguar
      - Tiger
    - Neofelis

== Description ==
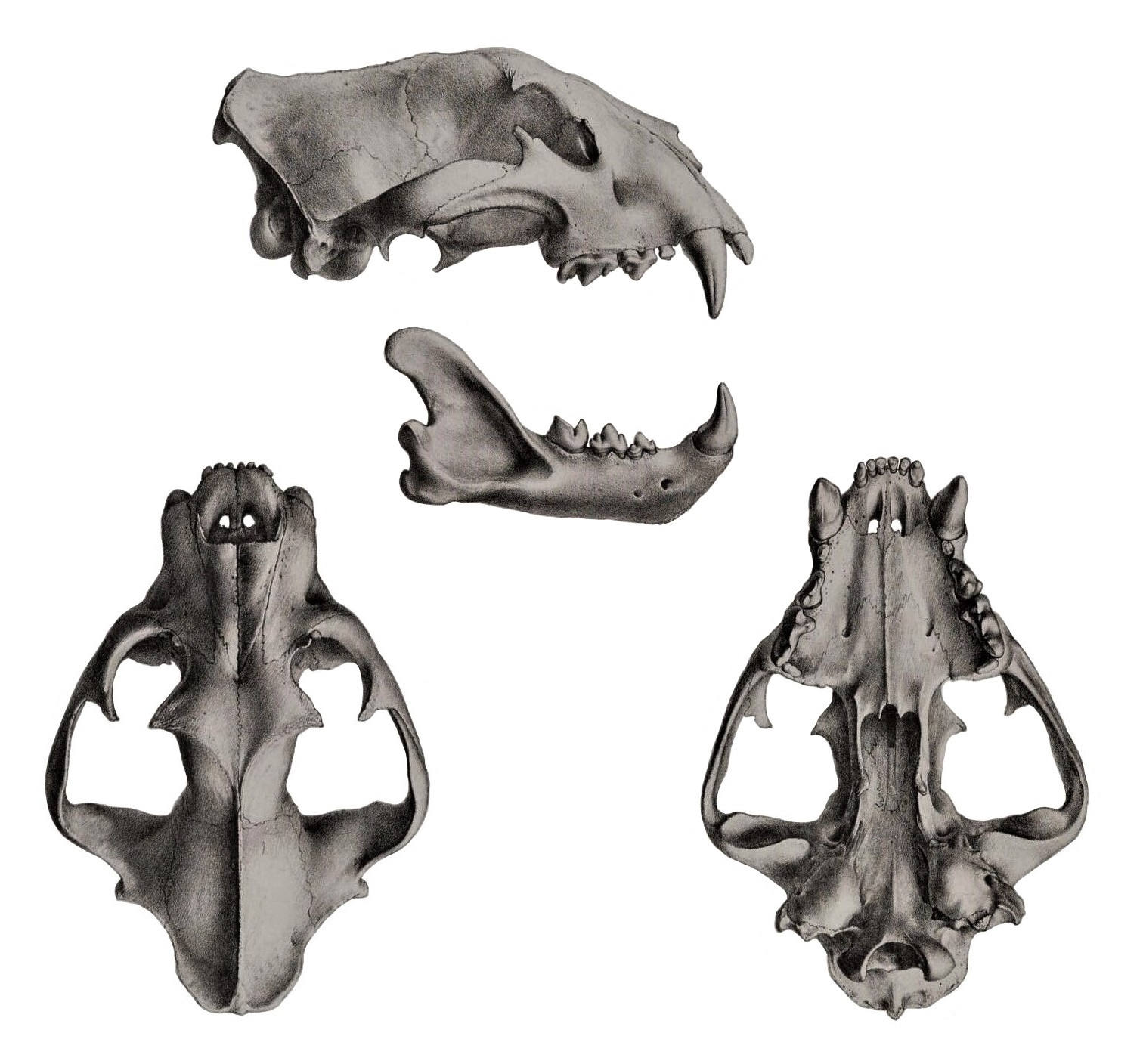
Skull of a jaguar

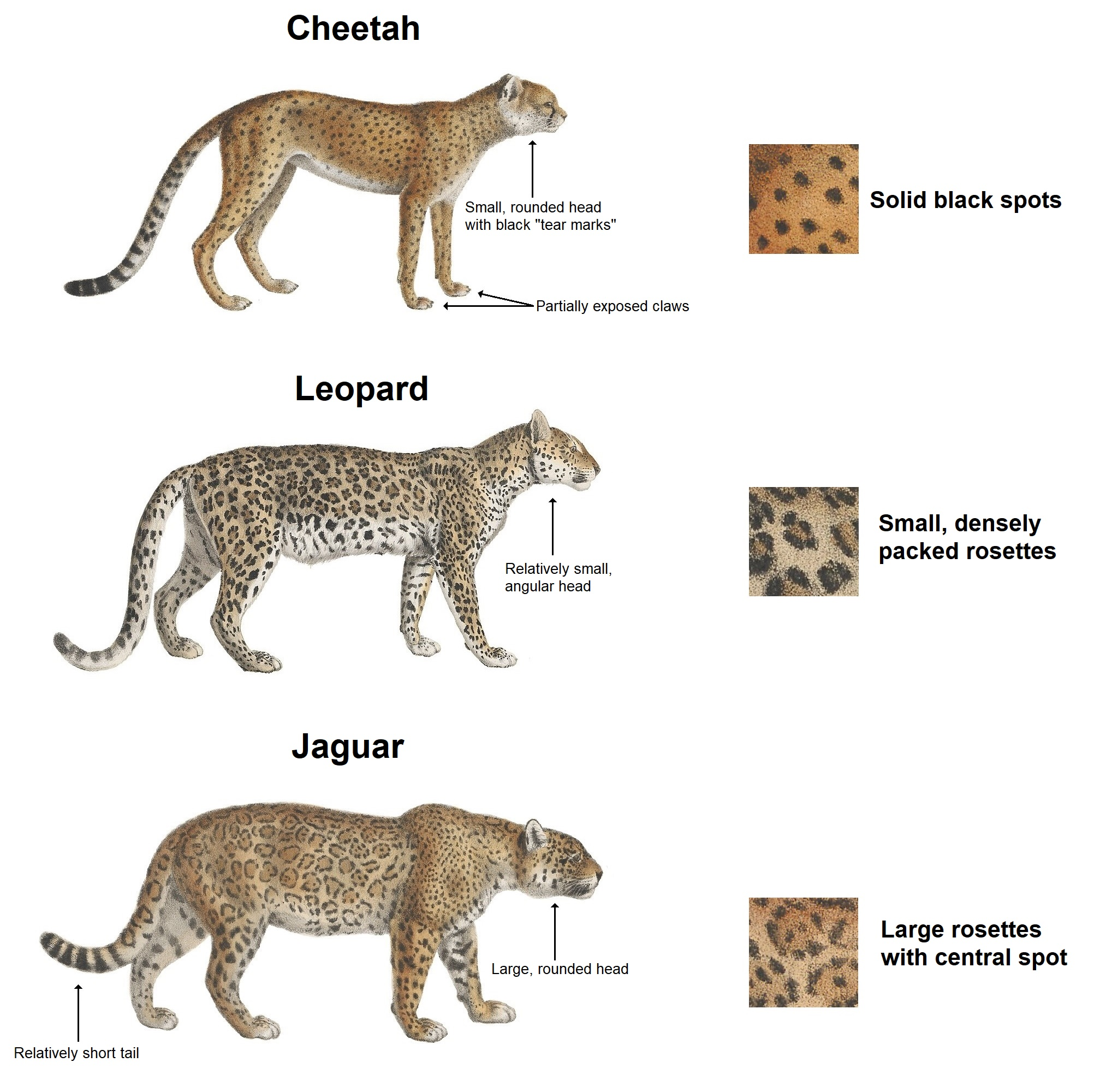
Illustration of cheetah, leopard and jaguar

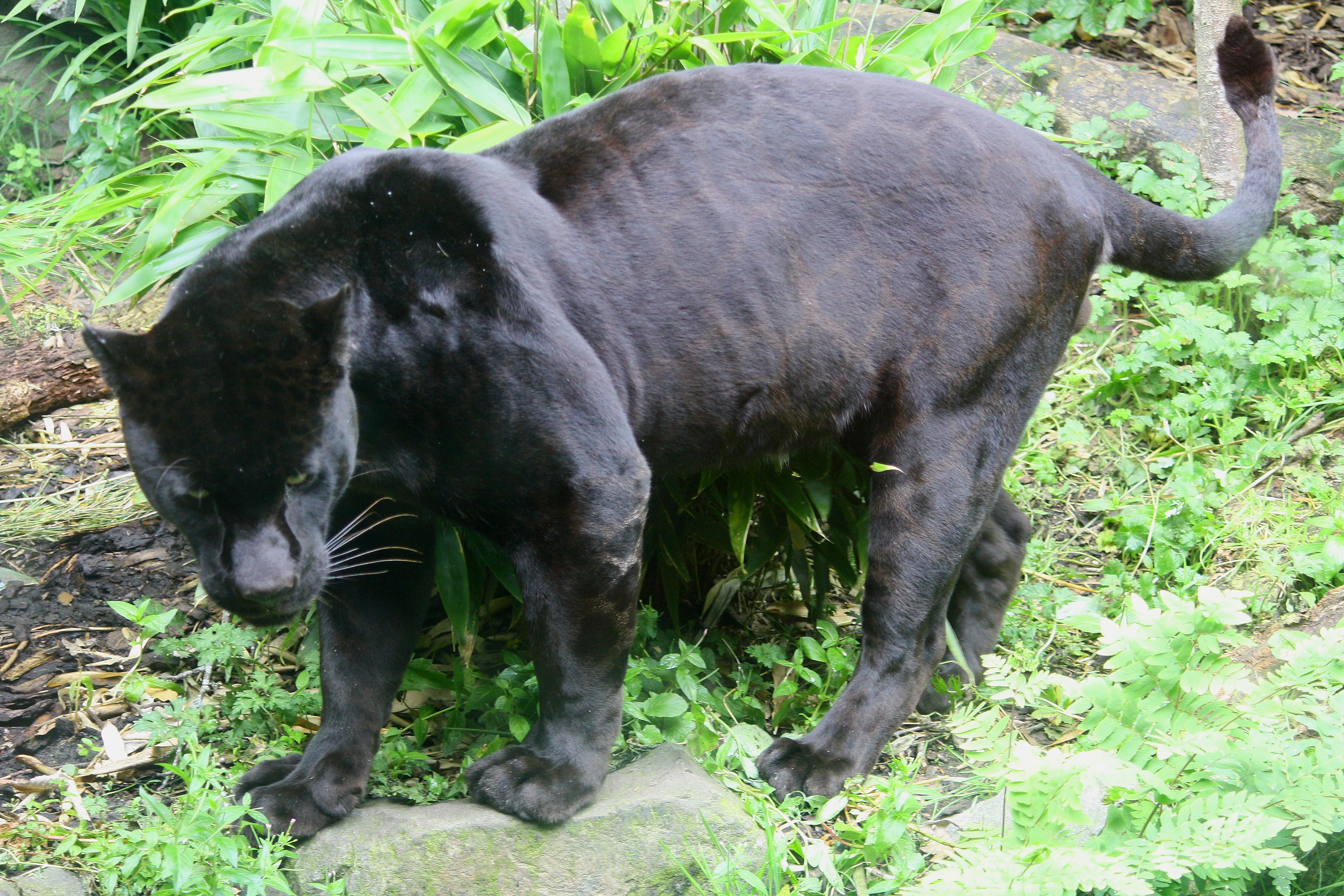
A black jaguar. Such melanistic jaguars as well as leopards are commonly called black panthers

The jaguar is a compact and muscular animal. It is the largest cat native to the Americas and the third largest in the world, exceeded in size only by the tiger and the lion. It stands 57 to 81 cm (22.4 to 31.9 in) tall at the shoulders. Its size and weight vary considerably depending on sex and region: weights in most regions are normally in the range of 56–96 kg (123–212 lb). Exceptionally big males have been recorded to weigh as much as 158 kg (348 lb). The smallest females from Middle America weigh about 36 kg (79 lb). It is sexually dimorphic, with females typically being 10–20% smaller than males. The length from the nose to the base of the tail varies from 1.12 to 1.85 m (3.7 to 6.1 ft). The tail is 45 to 75 cm (17.7 to 29.5 in) long and the shortest of any big cat. Its muscular legs are shorter than the legs of other Panthera species with similar body weight.

Size tends to increase from north to south. Jaguars in the Chamela-Cuixmala Biosphere Reserve on the Pacific coast of central Mexico weighed around 50 kg (110 lb). Jaguars in Venezuela and Brazil are much larger, with average weights of about 95 kg (209 lb) in males and of about 56–78 kg (123–172 lb) in females.

The jaguar's coat ranges from pale yellow to tan or reddish-yellow, with a whitish underside and covered in black spots. The spots and their shapes vary: on the sides, they become rosettes which may include one or several dots. The spots on the head and neck are generally solid, as are those on the tail where they may merge to form bands near the end and create a black tip. They are elongated on the middle of the back, often connecting to create a median stripe, and blotchy on the belly. These patterns serve as camouflage in areas with dense vegetation and patchy shadows. Jaguars living in forests are often darker and considerably smaller than those living in open areas, possibly due to the smaller numbers of large, herbivorous prey in forest areas.

The jaguar closely resembles the leopard but is generally more robust, with stockier limbs and a more square head. The rosettes on a jaguar's coat are larger, darker, fewer in number and have thicker lines, with a small spot in the middle. It has powerful jaws with the third-highest bite force of all felids, after the tiger and the lion. It has an average bite force at the canine tip of 887.0 Newton and a bite force quotient at the canine tip of 118.6. A 100 kg (220 lb) jaguar can bite with a force of 4.939 kN (1,110 lbf) with the canine teeth and 6.922 kN (1,556 lbf) at the carnassial notch.

=== Color variation ===
Melanistic jaguars are also known as black panthers. The black morph is less common than the spotted one. Black jaguars have been documented in Central and South America. Melanism in the jaguar is caused by deletions in the melanocortin 1 receptor gene and inherited through a dominant allele. Black jaguars occur at higher densities in tropical rainforest and are more active during the daytime. This suggests that melanism provides camouflage in the deep shadows of dense vegetation with high illumination.

In 2004, a camera trap in the Sierra Madre Occidental mountains photographed the first documented black jaguar in Northern Mexico. Black jaguars were also photographed in Costa Rica's Alberto Manuel Brenes Biological Reserve, in the mountains of the Cordillera de Talamanca, in Barbilla National Park and in eastern Panama.

== Distribution and habitat ==
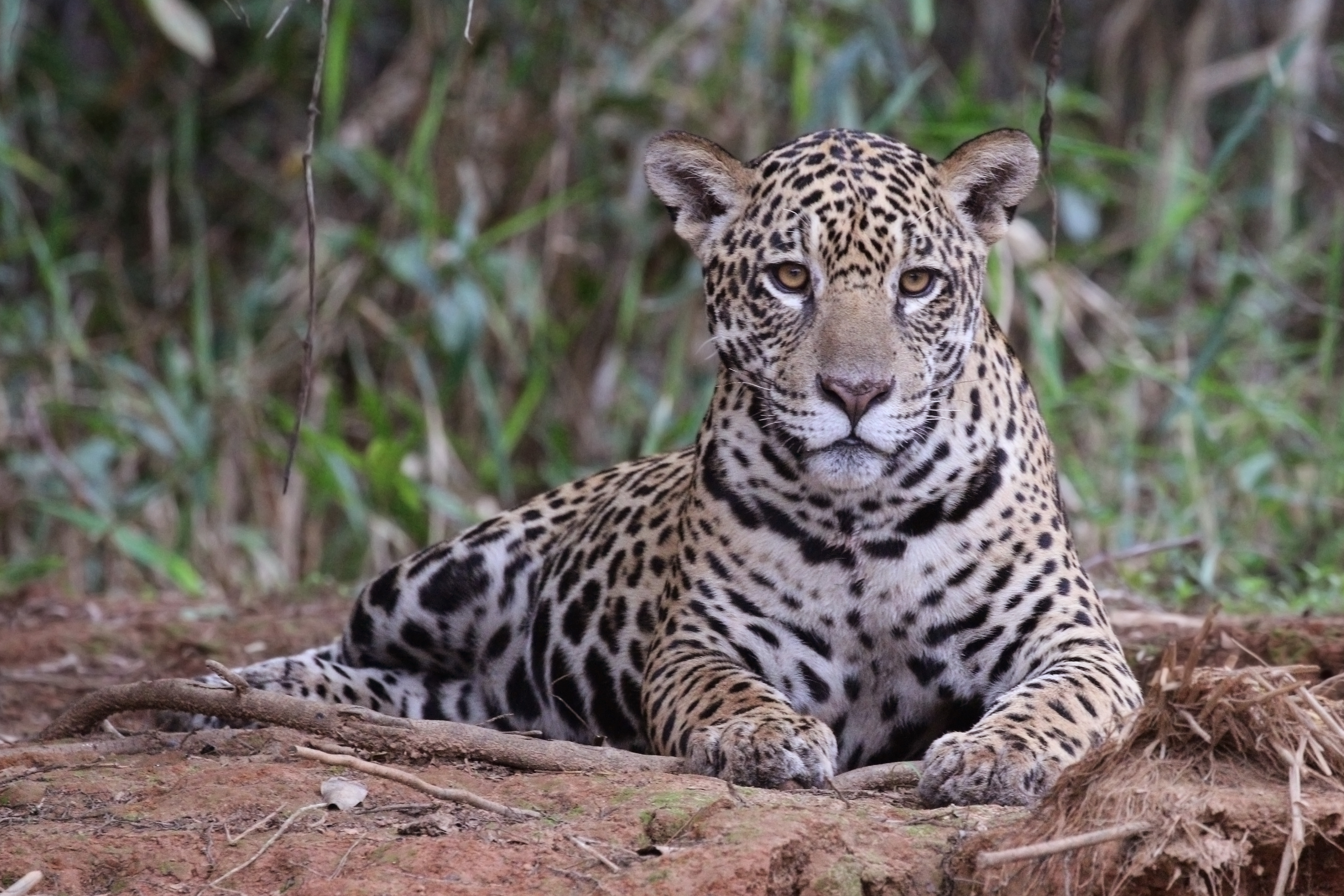
A female jaguar at Piquiri River, Mato Grosso state, Brazil

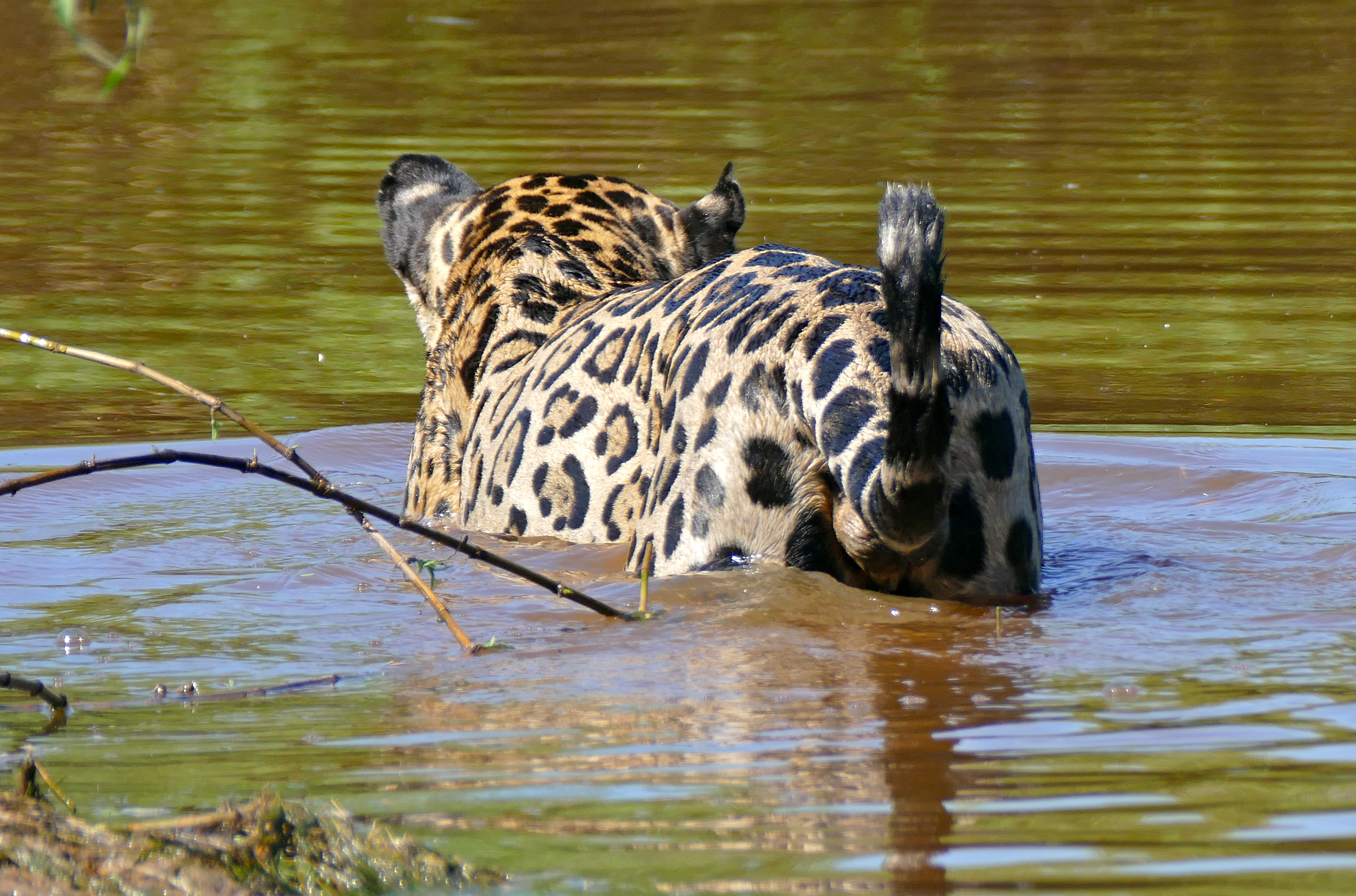
A jaguar in São Lourenço River

In 1999, the jaguar's historic range at the turn of the 20th century was estimated at 19,000,000 km^{2} (7,300,000 sq mi), stretching from the southern United States through Central America to southern Argentina. By the turn of the 21st century, its global range had decreased to about 8,750,000 km^{2} (3,380,000 sq mi), with most declines occurring in the southern United States, northern Mexico, northern Brazil, and southern Argentina. Its present range extends from the United States, Mexico, through Central America to South America comprising Belize, Guatemala, Honduras, Nicaragua, Costa Rica, particularly on the Osa Peninsula, Panama, Colombia, Venezuela, Guyana, Suriname, French Guiana, Ecuador, Peru, Bolivia, Brazil, Paraguay and Argentina. It is considered to be locally extinct in El Salvador and Uruguay.

Jaguars have been occasionally sighted in Arizona, New Mexico and Texas, with 62 accounts reported in the 20th century. Between 2012 and 2015, a male vagrant jaguar was recorded in 23 locations in the Santa Rita Mountains. Eight jaguars were photographed in the southwestern US between 1996 and 2024.

The jaguar prefers dense forest and typically inhabits dry deciduous forests, tropical and subtropical moist broadleaf forests, rainforests and cloud forests in Central and South America; open, seasonally flooded wetlands, dry grassland and historically also oak forests in the United States. It has been recorded at elevations up to 3,800 m (12,500 ft) but avoids montane forests. It favors riverine habitat and swamps with dense vegetation cover. In the Mayan forests of Mexico and Guatemala, 11 GPS-collared jaguars preferred undisturbed dense habitat away from roads; females avoided even areas with low levels of human activity, whereas males appeared less disturbed by human population density. A young male jaguar was also recorded in the semi-arid Sierra de San Carlos at a waterhole.

=== Former range ===
In the 19th century, the jaguar was still sighted at the North Platte River 48–80 km (30–50 miles) north of Longs Peak in Colorado, in coastal Louisiana, northern Arizona and New Mexico. Multiple verified zoological reports of the jaguar are known in California, two as far north as Monterey in 1814 and 1826. The only record of an active jaguar den with breeding adults and kittens in the United States was in the Tehachapi Mountains of California prior to 1860. The jaguar persisted in California until about 1860. The last confirmed jaguar in Texas was shot in 1948, 4.8 km (3 miles) southeast of Kingsville, Texas. In Arizona, a female was shot in the White Mountains in 1963. By the late 1960s, the jaguar was thought to have been extirpated in the United States. Arizona outlawed jaguar hunting in 1969, but by then no females remained, and over the next 25 years only two males were sighted and killed in the state. In 1996, a rancher and hunting guide from Douglas, Arizona came across a jaguar in the Peloncillo Mountains and became a researcher on jaguars, placing trail cameras, which recorded four more jaguars.

Historical photographs indicate that the jaguar occurred in the Brazilian state of Santa Catarina until at least 1984.

== Behavior and ecology ==
The jaguar is mostly active at night and during twilight. However, jaguars living in densely forested regions of the Amazon rainforest and the Pantanal are largely active by day, whereas jaguars in the Atlantic Forest are primarily active by night. The activity pattern of the jaguar coincides with the activity of its main prey species. Jaguars are good swimmers and play and hunt in the water, possibly more than tigers. They have been recorded moving between islands and the shore, swimming distances of at least 1.3km. Jaguars are also good at climbing trees but do so less often than cougars.

=== Ecological role ===
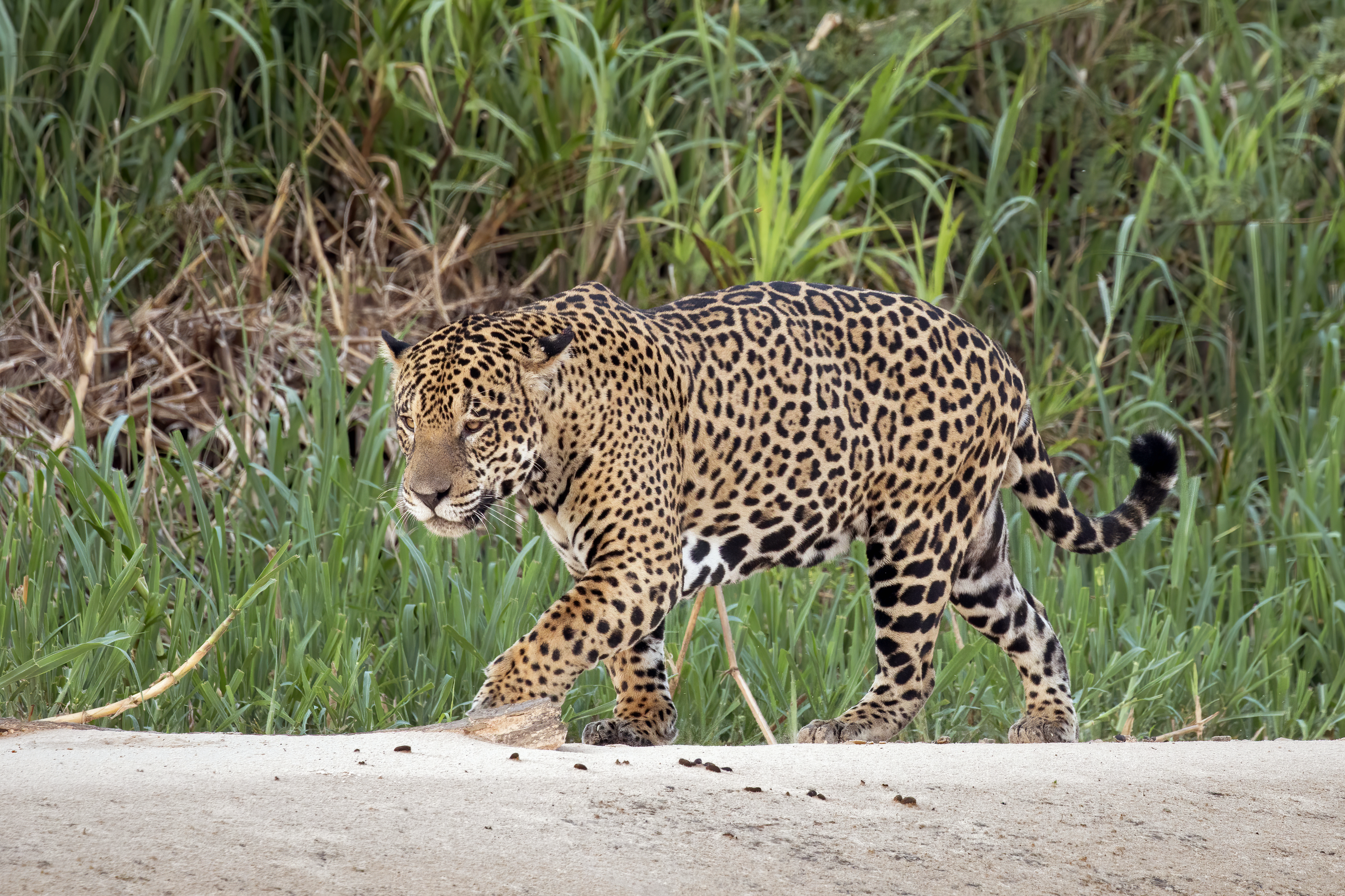
Jaguar at Three Brothers River, Pantanal, Brazil

The adult jaguar is an apex predator, meaning it is at the top of the food chain and is not preyed upon in the wild. The jaguar has also been termed a keystone species, as it is assumed that it controls the population levels of prey such as herbivorous and seed-eating mammals and thus maintains the structural integrity of forest systems. However, field work has shown this may be natural variability, and the population increases may not be sustained. Thus, the keystone predator hypothesis is not accepted by all scientists.

The jaguar is sympatric with the cougar. In central Mexico, both prey on white-tailed deer, which makes up 54% and 66% of jaguar and cougar's prey, respectively. In northern Mexico, the jaguar and the cougar share the same habitat, and their diet overlaps dependent on prey availability. Jaguars seemed to prefer deer and calves. In Mexico and Central America, neither of the two cats are considered to be the dominant predator. In South America, the jaguar is larger than the cougar and tends to take larger prey, usually over 22 kg (49 lb). The cougar's prey usually weighs between 2 and 22 kg (4 and 49 lb), which is thought to be the reason for its smaller size. This situation may be advantageous to the cougar. Its broader prey niche, including its ability to take smaller prey, may give it an advantage over the jaguar in human-altered landscapes.

=== Hunting and diet ===
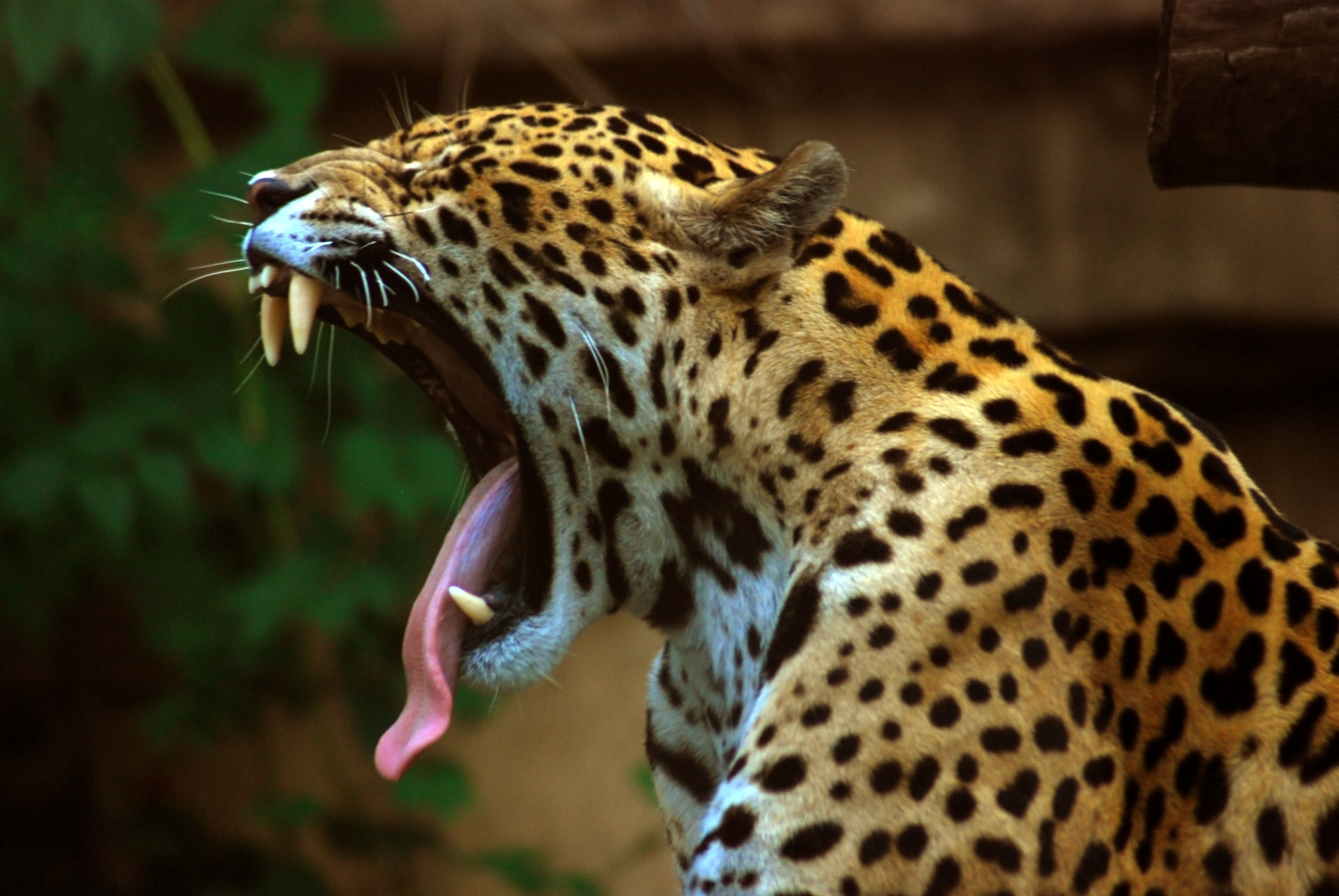
The jaguar has a powerful bite that allows it to pierce the shells of armored prey.

Jaguar killing a yacare caiman

The jaguar is an obligate carnivore and depends solely on flesh for its nutrient requirements. The daily food requirement of a captive jaguar weighing 34 kg (75 lb) was estimated at 1.4 kg (3.1 lb) of meat. An analysis of 53 studies documenting the diet of the jaguar revealed that its prey ranges in weight from 1 to 130 kg (2.2 to 286.6 lb); it prefers prey weighing 45–85 kg (99–187 lb), with the capybara and the giant anteater being the most selected. When available, it also preys on marsh deer, southern tamandua, collared peccary and black agouti. In floodplains, it opportunistically takes reptiles such as green anaconda, caiman and turtle species. In the Brazilian Pantanal, it primarily feeds on aquatic reptiles and fish including thorny catfish, small-scaled pacu, red-bellied piranha and barred catfish. It also preys on livestock in cattle ranching areas where wild prey is scarce.

The jaguar's bite force allows it to pierce the carapaces of the yellow-spotted Amazon river turtle and the yellow-footed tortoise. It employs an unusual killing method: it bites mammalian prey directly through the skull between the ears to deliver a fatal bite to the brain. It kills capybara by piercing its canine teeth through the temporal bones of its skull, breaking its zygomatic arch and mandible and penetrating its brain, often through the ears. It has been hypothesized to be an adaptation to cracking open turtle shells; armored reptiles may have formed an abundant prey base for the jaguar following the late Pleistocene extinctions. However, this is disputed, as even in areas where the jaguar preys on reptiles, it more frequently takes mammals in spite of the greater reptile abundance.

Between October 2001 and April 2004, 10 jaguars were monitored in the southern Pantanal. In the dry season from April to September, they killed prey at intervals ranging from one to seven days; and ranging from one to 16 days in the wet season from October to March.

The jaguar uses a stalk-and-ambush strategy when hunting rather than chasing prey. The cat will slowly walk down forest paths, listening for and stalking prey before rushing or ambushing. The jaguar attacks from cover and usually from a target's blind spot with a quick pounce; the species' ambushing abilities are considered nearly peerless in the animal kingdom by both Indigenous people and field researchers and are probably a product of its role as an apex predator in several different environments. The ambush may include leaping into water after prey, as a jaguar is capable of carrying a large kill while swimming; it is strong enough to haul carcasses as large as a heifer up a tree to avoid flood levels. After killing the prey, it drags the carcass to a thicket or other secluded spot. It begins eating at the neck and chest, consumes heart and lungs, followed by the shoulders.

=== Social activity ===
Jaguar male and female

The jaguar is generally solitary except for females with cubs. In 1977, groups consisting of a male, female and cubs, and two females with two males were sighted several times in a study area in the Paraguay River valley; a radio-collared female moved in a home range of 25–38 km^{2} (9.7–14.7 sq mi), which partly overlapped with another female. The home range of the male in this study area overlapped with several females. In the Venezuelan Llanos and Brazilian Pantanal, male coalitions were detected, which marked, defended and invaded territories together, hunted together and mated with several females.

The jaguar uses scrape marks, urine, and feces to mark its territory. The size of home ranges depends on the level of deforestation and human population density. The home ranges of females vary from 15.3 km^{2} (5.9 sq mi) in the Pantanal to 53.6 km^{2} (20.7 sq mi) in the Amazon to 233.5 km^{2} (90.2 sq mi) in the Atlantic Forest. Male jaguar home ranges vary from 25 km^{2} (9.7 sq mi) in the Pantanal to 180.3 km^{2} (69.6 sq mi) in the Amazon to 591.4 km^{2} (228.3 sq mi) in the Atlantic Forest and 807.4 km^{2} (311.7 sq mi) in the Cerrado. Studies employing GPS telemetry in 2003 and 2004 found densities of only six to seven jaguars per 100 km (62 mi) in the Pantanal region, compared with 10 to 11 using traditional methods; this suggests the widely used sampling methods may inflate the actual numbers of individuals in a sampling area. Fights between males occur but are rare, and avoidance behavior has been observed in the wild. In one wetland population with degraded territorial boundaries and more social proximity, adults of the same sex are more tolerant of each other and engage in more friendly and co-operative interactions.

=== Vocalizations ===
Captive jaguar vocalizing while playing

The jaguar roars or grunts for long-distance communication; intensive bouts of counter-calling between individuals have been observed in the wild. This vocalization is described as "hoarse" with five or six guttural notes. Prusten is produced by individuals when greeting, during courtship display, or by a mother comforting her cubs. This sound is described as low intensity snorts, possibly intended to signal tranquility and passivity. Adults also growl during courtship and mating, while cubs bleat, gurgle and meow. Female jaguars also meow to keep in contact with their offspring.

=== Reproduction and life cycle ===
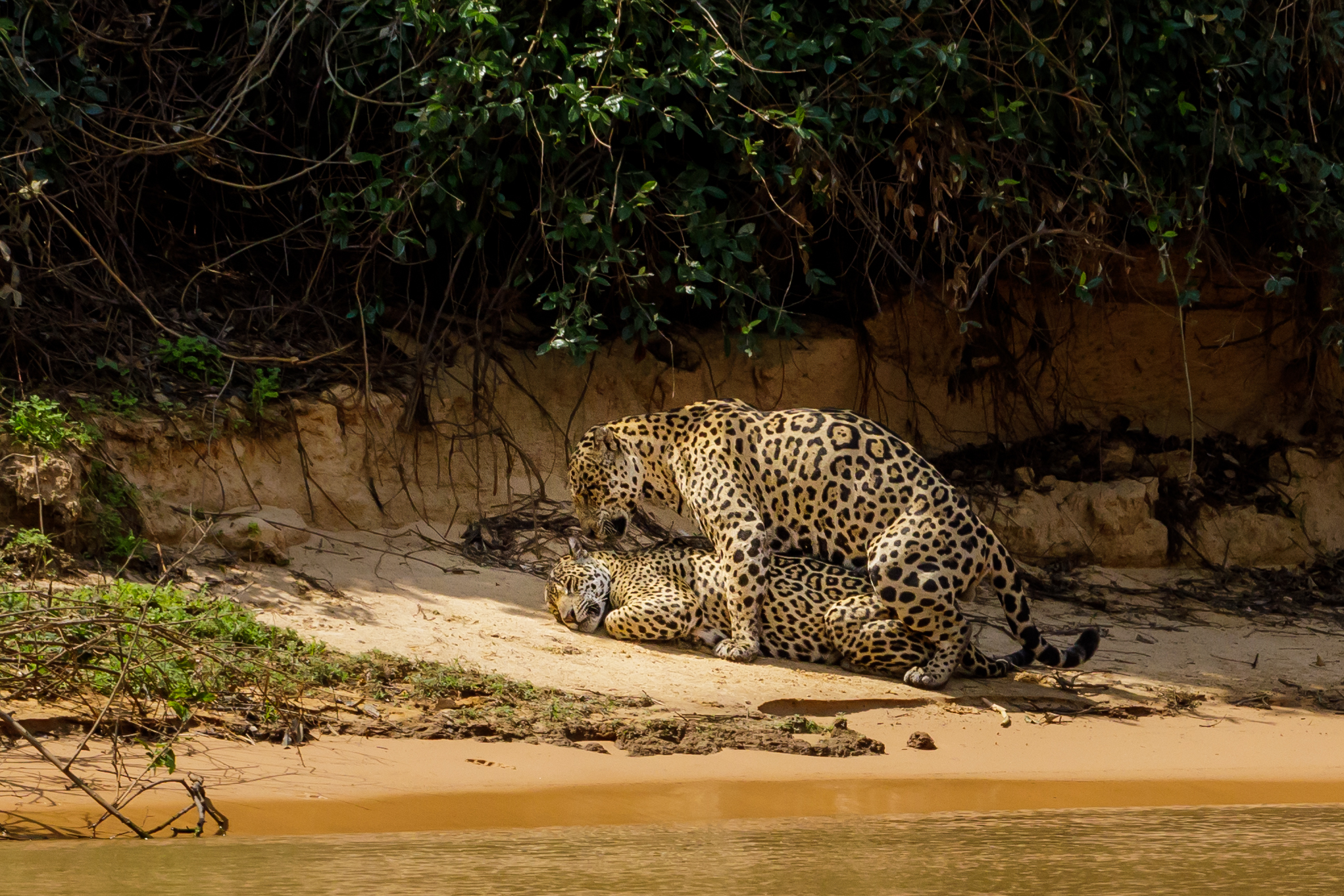
Jaguars mating in the northern Pantanal

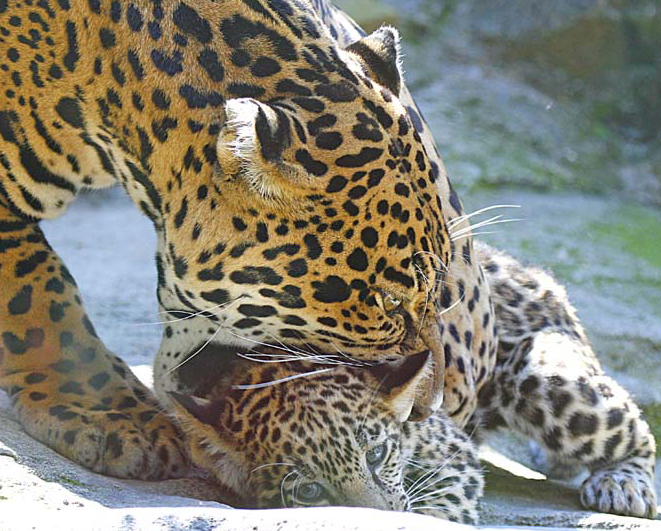
Female jaguar picking up her cub

In captivity, the female jaguar is recorded to reach sexual maturity at the age of about 2.5 years. Estrus lasts 7–15 days with an estrus cycle of 41.8 to 52.6 days. During estrus, she exhibits increased restlessness with rolling and prolonged vocalizations. She is an induced ovulator but can also ovulate spontaneously. Gestation lasts 91 to 111 days. The male is sexually mature at the age of three to four years. His mean ejaculate volume is 8.6±1.3 ml. Generation length of the jaguar is 9.8 years.

In the Pantanal, breeding pairs were observed to stay together for up to five days. Females had one to two cubs. The young are born with closed eyes but open them after two weeks. Cubs are weaned at the age of three months but remain in the birth den for six months before leaving to accompany their mother on hunts. Jaguars remain with their mothers for up to two years. They appear to rarely live beyond 11 years, but captive individuals may live 22 years.

In 2001, a male jaguar killed and partially consumed two cubs in Emas National Park. DNA paternity testing of blood samples revealed that the male was the father of the cubs. Two more cases of infanticide were documented in the northern Pantanal in 2013. To defend against infanticide, the female hides her cubs and distracts the male with courtship behavior.

=== Attacks on humans ===
The Spanish conquistadors feared the jaguar. According to Charles Darwin, the Indigenous peoples of South America stated that people did not need to fear the jaguar as long as capybaras were abundant. The first official record of a jaguar killing a human in Brazil dates to June 2008. Two children were attacked by jaguars in Guyana. The majority of known attacks on people happened when it had been cornered or wounded.

== Threats ==
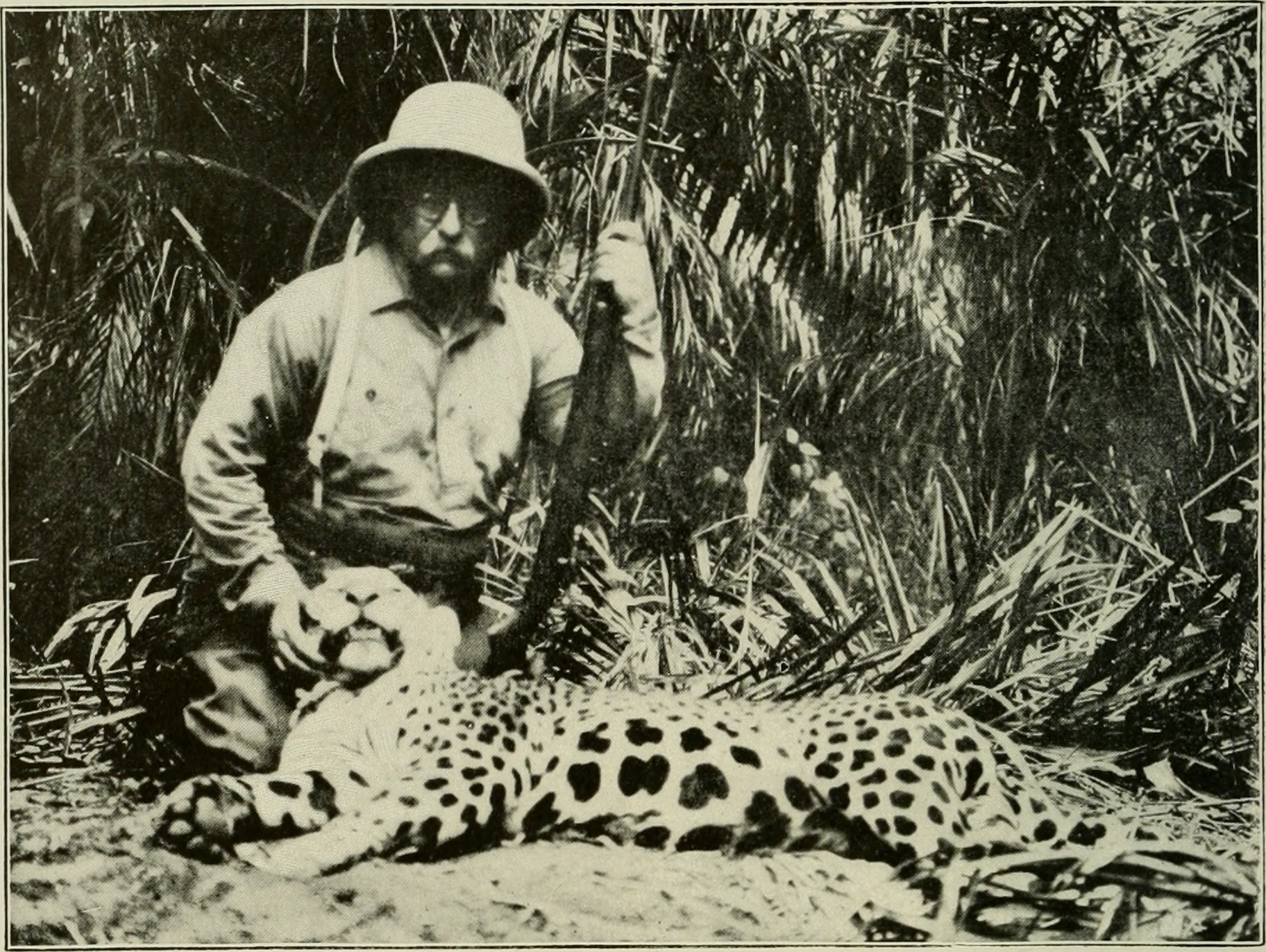
A South American jaguar killed by Theodore Roosevelt

The jaguar is threatened by loss and fragmentation of habitat, illegal killing in retaliation for livestock depredation and for illegal trade in jaguar body parts. It is listed as Near Threatened on the IUCN Red List since 2002, as the jaguar population has probably declined by 20–25% since the mid-1990s. Deforestation is a major threat to the jaguar across its range. Habitat loss was most rapid in drier regions such as the Argentine pampas, the arid grasslands of Mexico and the southwestern United States.

In 2002, it was estimated that the range of the jaguar had declined to about 46% of its range in the early 20th century. In 2018, it was estimated that its range had declined by 55% in the last century. The only remaining stronghold is the Amazon rainforest, a region that is rapidly being fragmented by deforestation. Between 2000 and 2012, forest loss in the jaguar range amounted to 83.759 km^{2} (32.340 sq mi), with fragmentation increasing in particular in corridors between Jaguar Conservation Units (JCUs). By 2014, direct linkages between two JCUs in Bolivia were lost, and two JCUs in northern Argentina became completely isolated due to deforestation.

In Mexico, the jaguar is primarily threatened by poaching. Its habitat is fragmented in northern Mexico, in the Gulf of Mexico and the Yucatán Peninsula, caused by changes in land use, construction of roads and tourism infrastructure. In Panama, 220 of 230 jaguars were killed in retaliation for predation on livestock between 1998 and 2014. In Venezuela, the jaguar was extirpated in about 26% of its range in the country since 1940, mostly in dry savannas and unproductive scrubland in the northeastern region of Anzoátegui. In Ecuador, the jaguar is threatened by reduced prey availability in areas where the expansion of the road network facilitated access of human hunters to forests. In the Alto Paraná Atlantic forests, at least 117 jaguars were killed in Iguaçu National Park and the adjacent Misiones Province between 1995 and 2008. Some Afro-Colombians in the Colombian Chocó Department hunt jaguars for consumption and sale of meat. Between 2008 and 2012, at least 15 jaguars were killed by livestock farmers in central Belize.

The international trade of jaguar skins boomed between the end of the Second World War and the early 1970s. Significant declines occurred in the 1960s, as more than 15,000 jaguars were yearly killed for their skins in the Brazilian Amazon alone; the trade in jaguar skins decreased since 1973 when the Convention on International Trade in Endangered Species was enacted. Interview surveys with 533 people in the northwestern Bolivian Amazon revealed that local people killed jaguars out of fear, in retaliation, and for trade. Between August 2016 and August 2019, jaguar skins and body parts were seen for sale in tourist markets in the Peruvian cities of Lima, Iquitos and Pucallpa. Human-wildlife conflict, opportunistic hunting and hunting for trade in domestic markets are key drivers for killing jaguars in Belize and Guatemala. Seizure reports indicate that at least 857 jaguars were involved in trade between 2012 and 2018, including 482 individuals in Bolivia alone; 31 jaguars were seized in China. Between 2014 and early 2019, 760 jaguar fangs were seized that originated in Bolivia and were destined for China. Undercover investigations revealed that the smuggling of jaguar body parts is run by Chinese residents in Bolivia.

== Conservation ==
The jaguar is listed on CITES Appendix I, which means that all international commercial trade in jaguars or their body parts is prohibited. Hunting jaguars is prohibited in Argentina, Brazil, Colombia, French Guiana, Honduras, Nicaragua, Panama, Paraguay, Suriname, the United States, and Venezuela. Hunting jaguars is restricted in Guatemala and Peru. In Ecuador, hunting jaguars is prohibited, and it is classified as threatened with extinction. In Guyana, it is protected as an endangered species, and hunting it is illegal.

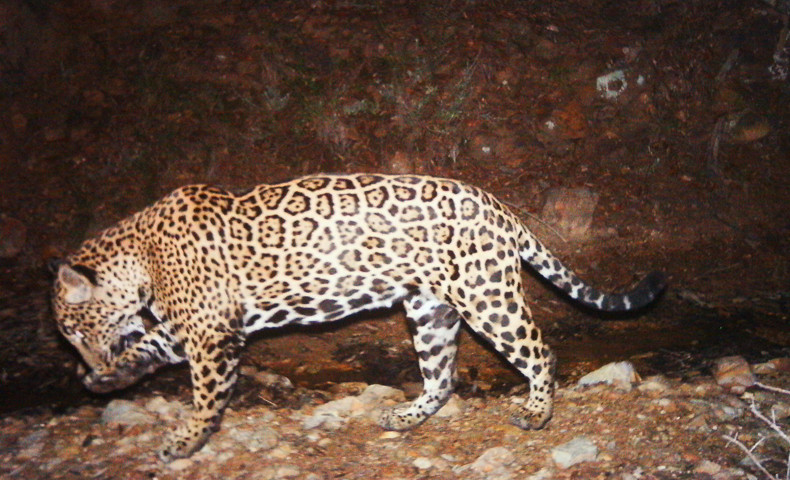
El Jefe, a jaguar in Arizona

In 1986, the Cockscomb Basin Wildlife Sanctuary was established in Belize as the world's first protected area for jaguar conservation.

=== Jaguar Conservation Units ===
In 1999, field scientists from 18 jaguar range countries determined the most important areas for long-term jaguar conservation based on the status of jaguar population units, stability of prey base and quality of habitat. These areas, called "Jaguar Conservation Units" (JCUs), are large enough for at least 50 breeding individuals and range in size from 566 to 67,598 km^{2} (219 to 26,100 sq mi); 51 JCUs were designated in 36 geographic regions including:

- the Sierra Madre Occidental and Sierra de Tamaulipas in Mexico
- the Selva Maya tropical forests extending over Mexico, Belize and Guatemala
- the Chocó–Darién moist forests from Honduras and Panama to Colombia
- Venezuelan Llanos
- northern Cerrado and Amazon basin in Brazil
- Tropical Andes in Bolivia and Peru
- Misiones Province in Argentina

Optimal routes of travel between core jaguar population units were identified across its range in 2010 to implement wildlife corridors that connect JCUs. These corridors represent areas with the shortest distance between jaguar breeding populations, require the least possible energy input of dispersing individuals and pose a low mortality risk. They cover an area of 2,600,000 km^{2} (1,000,000 sq mi) and range in length from 3 to 1,102 km (1.9 to 684.8 mi) in Mexico and Central America and from 489.14 to 1,607 km (303.94 to 998.54 mi) in South America. Cooperation with local landowners and municipal, state, or federal agencies is essential to maintain connected populations and prevent fragmentation in both JCUs and corridors. Seven of 13 corridors in Mexico are functioning with a width of at least 14.25 km (8.85 mi) and a length of no more than 320 km (200 mi). The other corridors may hamper passage, as they are narrower and longer.

In August 2012, the United States Fish and Wildlife Service set aside 3,392.20 km^{2} (838,232 acres) in Arizona and New Mexico for the protection of the jaguar. The Jaguar Recovery Plan was published in April 2019, in which Interstate 10 is considered to form the northern boundary of the Jaguar Recovery Unit in Arizona and New Mexico.

In Mexico, a national conservation strategy was developed from 2005 on and published in 2016. The Mexican jaguar population increased from an estimated 4,000 individuals in 2010 to about 4,800 individuals in 2018. This increase is seen as a positive effect of conservation measures that were implemented in cooperation with governmental and non-governmental institutions and landowners.

An evaluation of JCUs from Mexico to Argentina revealed that they overlap with high-quality habitats of about 1,500 mammals to varying degrees. Since co-occurring mammals benefit from the JCU approach, the jaguar has been called an umbrella species. Central American JCUs overlap with the habitat of 187 of 304 regional endemic amphibian and reptile species, of which 19 amphibians occur only in the jaguar range.

=== Approaches ===
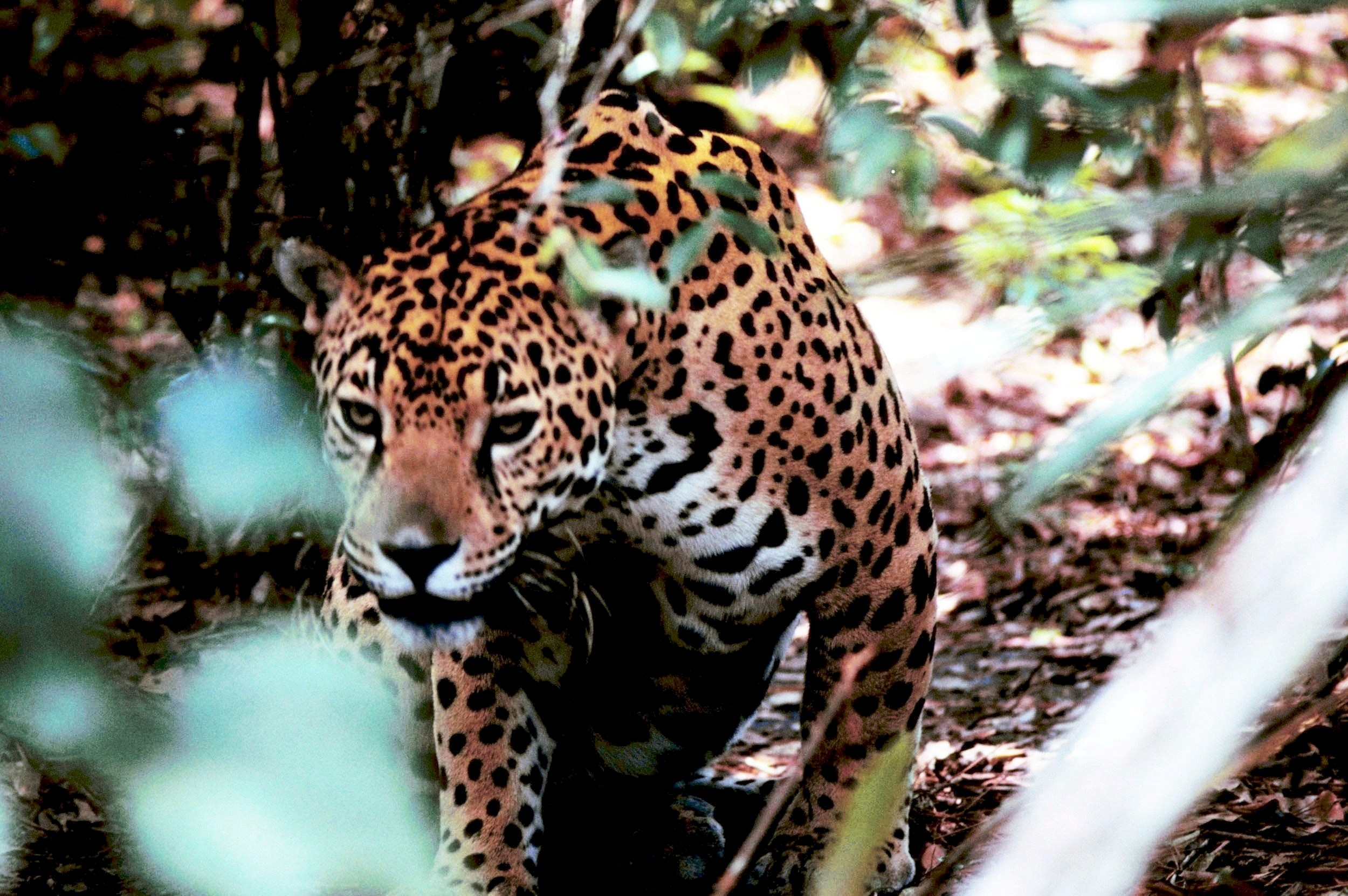
A jaguar in Belize

In setting up protected reserves, efforts generally also have to be focused on the surrounding areas, as jaguars are unlikely to confine themselves to the bounds of a reservation, especially if the population is increasing in size. Human attitudes in the areas surrounding reserves and laws and regulations to prevent poaching are essential to make conservation areas effective.

To estimate population sizes within specific areas and to keep track of individual jaguars, camera trapping and wildlife tracking telemetry are widely used, and feces are sought out with the help of detection dogs to study jaguar health and diet.

Current conservation efforts often focus on educating ranch owners and promoting ecotourism.

Conservationists and professionals in Mexico and the United States have established the 56,000 acres (23,000 ha) Northern Jaguar Reserve in northern Mexico. Advocacy for reintroduction of the jaguar to its former range in Arizona and New Mexico have been supported by documentation of natural migrations by individual jaguars into the southern reaches of both states, the recency of extirpation from those regions by human action, and supportive arguments pertaining to biodiversity, ecological, human, and practical considerations.

== In culture and mythology ==
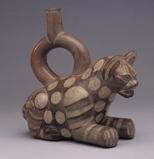
Moche jaguar figurine dating to 300 CE, at the Larco Museum in Lima, Peru

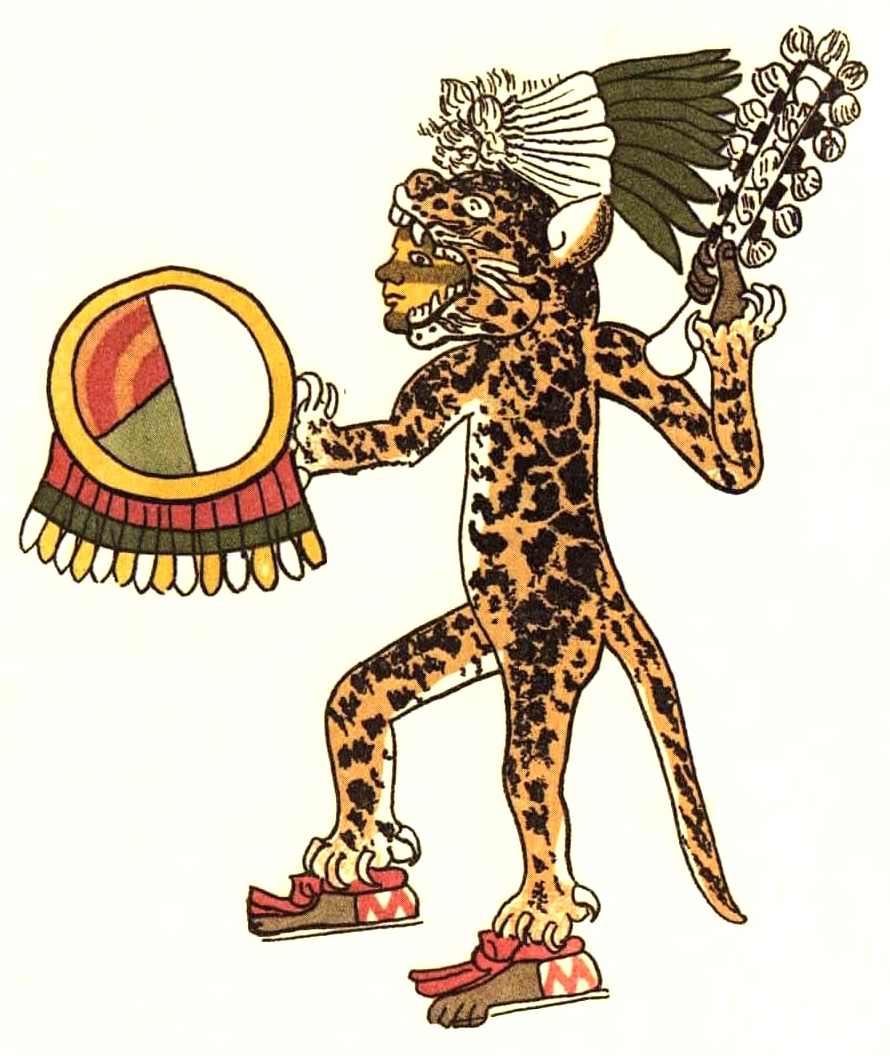
Jaguar warrior in the Aztec culture

In the pre-Columbian Americas, the jaguar was a symbol of power and strength. In the Andes, a jaguar cult disseminated by the early Chavín culture became accepted over most of today's Peru by 900 BC. The later Moche culture in northern Peru used the jaguar as a symbol of power in many of their ceramics. In the Muisca religion in Altiplano Cundiboyacense, the jaguar was considered a sacred animal, and people dressed in jaguar skins during religious rituals. The skins were traded with peoples in the nearby Orinoquía Region. The name of the Muisca ruler Nemequene was derived from the Chibcha words nymy and quyne, meaning "force of the jaguar".

Sculptures with "Olmec were-jaguar" motifs were found on the Yucatán Peninsula in Veracruz and Tabasco; they show stylized jaguars with half-human faces. In the later Maya civilization, the jaguar was known as balam or bolom in many of the Mayan languages, and was used to symbolize warriors and the elite class for being brave, fierce and strong. It was associated with the underworld and its image was used to decorate tombs and grave-good vessels.

The Aztec civilization called the jaguar ocelotl and considered it to be the king of the animals. It was believed to be fierce and courageous, but also wise, dignified and careful. The military had two classes of warriors, the ocelotl or jaguar warriors and the cuauhtli or eagle warriors and each dressed like their representative animal. In addition, members of the royal class would decorate in jaguar skins. The jaguar was considered to be the totem animal of the powerful deities Tezcatlipoca and Tepeyollotl.

A conch shell gorget depicting a jaguar was found in a burial mound in Benton County, Missouri. The gorget shows evenly-engraved lines and measures 104 mm × 98 mm (4.1 in × 3.9 in). Rock drawings made by the Hopi, Anasazi and Pueblo all over the desert and chaparral regions of the American Southwest show an explicitly spotted cat, presumably a jaguar, as it is drawn much larger than an ocelot.

== See also ==
- List of largest cats
