= Regional Government of Huancavelica =

Regional government in Peru

- Gobierno Regional de Huancavelica

Regional Government overview
- Formed: January 1, 2003; 22 years ago
- Jurisdiction: Department of Huancavelica
- Website: Government site

The Regional Government of Huancavelica (Spanish: Gobierno Regional de Huancavelica; GORE Huancavelica) is the regional government that represents the Department of Huancavelica. It is the body with legal identity in public law and its own assets, which is in charge of the administration of provinces of the department in Peru. Its purpose is the social, cultural and economic development of its constituency. It is based in the city of Huancavelica.

== List of representatives ==
Governor	Political party	Period
Salvador Espinoza Huarocc	Movimiento Independiente de Campesinos y Profesionales	January 1, 2003–December 31, 2006
Federico Salas	Proyecto Integración de Comunidades Organizadas	January 1, 2007–December 31, 2010
Maciste Díaz Abad	Movimiento Independiente Trabajando para Todos	January 1, 2011–December 31, 2014
Glodoaldo Álvarez Oré	Movimiento Regional Autogobierno Ayllu	January 1, 2015–December 31, 2018
Maciste Díaz Abad	Movimiento Independiente Trabajando para Todos	January 1, 2019–December 31, 2022
Leoncio Huayllani Taype	Movimiento Regional Ayni	January 1, 2023–Incumbent

== See also ==
- Regional Governments of Peru
- Department of Huancavelica
