= Córdova District =

Coordinates: 14.0392°S 75.1846°W

Córdova
- District
- Interactive map of Córdova
- Country: Peru
- Region: Huancavelica
- Province: Huaytará
- Capital: Córdova

Area
  - Total: 104.59 km^{2} (40.38 sq mi)
- Elevation: 3,216 m (10,551 ft)

Population (2005 census)
  - Total: 2,404
  - Density: 22.98/km^{2} (59.53/sq mi)
- Time zone: UTC-5 (PET)
- UBIGEO: 090603

Córdova District is one of sixteen districts of the province Huaytará in Peru.
