= Inka Wasi, Huancavelica =

Archaeological site in Peru

Inka Wasi
- Location within Peru
- 13°34′25.83″S 75°15′12.64″W
- Cultures: Inca
- Location: Peru
- Region: Huancavelica Region

Site notes
- Height: 3,804 m (12,480 ft)

Inka Wasi (Quechua inka Inca, wasi house, "Inca house", also spelled Incahuasi, Inca Huasi) is an archaeological site in the Huancavelica Region in Peru. The Inca palace is considered one of the most important monuments of the Huancavelica Region. Inka Wasi is located in the Huaytará Province, Huaytará District, about 25 km from Huaytará. It is situated at a height of 3,804 m (12,480 ft).
