= Challwamayu (Huancavelica) =

- Etymology: Quechua

Location
- Country: Peru
- Region: Huancavelica Region

Physical characteristics
- Mouth: Pampas River

Challwamayu (Quechua challwa 'fish', mayu 'river', "fish river", hispaniciced spelling Chalhuamayo) is a river in Peru located in the Huancavelica Region, Huaytará Province, Pilpichaca District. It is an affluent of the Pampas River, the one which flows along the border of the Ayacucho and Huancavelica Regions. The confluence of the rivers is on the border of these regions, near Pukarumi (Pucarume). Challwamayu originates near the mountain Artisayuq (Artisayoc).
