= Querco, Peru =

Town

Coordinates: 13°58′56″S 74°58′32″W

Querco is a town and capital of the Querco District, a district of the Huaytará province in Peru. The residents here own bulls, ducks, sheep, dogs, pigs, and cattle.
