= Millococha =

Lake in Peru

- Location within Peru
- Location: Huancavelica Region
- Coordinates: 12°39′56″S 75°32′55″W
- Basin countries: Peru

Millococha (possibly from Quechua millu salty / aluminum sulfate used to dye something, qucha lake,) is a lake in Peru located in the Huancavelica Region, Huancavelica Province, Acobambilla District. Millococha lies west of the large lake named Huarmicocha. Near the lake there is also a village named Millococha.

== See also ==
- List of lakes in Peru
