= Qispi Q'awa =

Mountain in Peru

- Location within Peru

Highest point
- Elevation: 4,800 m (15,700 ft)
- Coordinates: 13°16′45″S 74°48′52″W

Geography
- Location: Peru, Huancavelica Region
- Parent range: Andes

Qispi Q'awa (Aymara, qispi something glittering, q'awa little river, ditch, crevice, fissure, gap in the earth, "glittering brook" or "glittering ravine", Hispanicized spelling Quispiccahua) is a mountain in the Andes of Peru, about 4,800 m (15,748 ft) high. It is situated in the Huancavelica Region, Huaytará Province, Pilpichaca District. Qispi Q'awa lies west of Wakan Q'allay.
