= Huaytará =

Huaytará Waytara
- Town
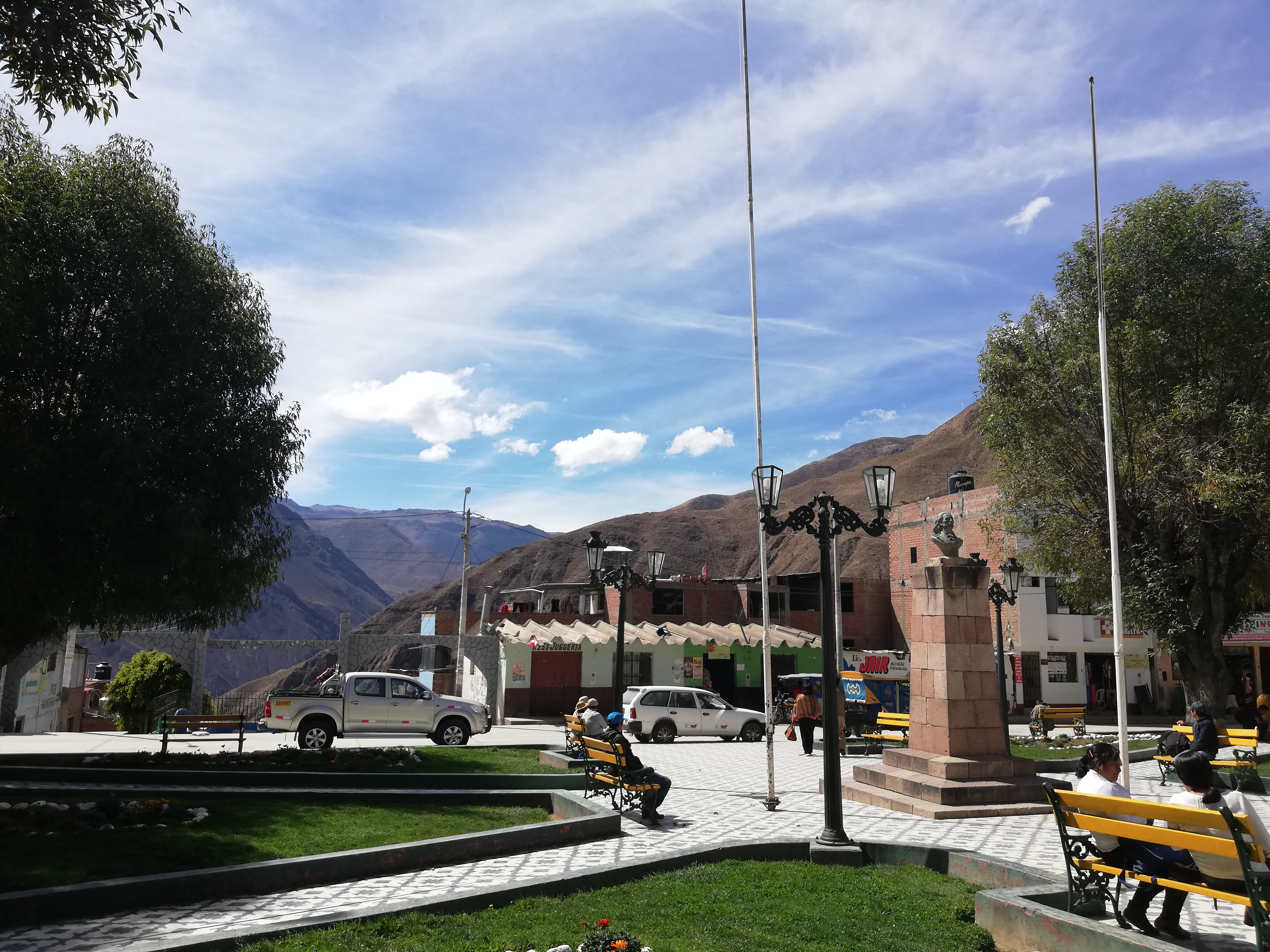
- Huaytará.jpg

- Location within Peru
- Coordinates: 13°36′16.00″S 75°21′11.20″W
- Country: Peru
- Region: Huancavelica
- Province: Huaytará
- District: Huaytará
- Elevation: 2,658 m (8,720 ft)
- Time zone: UTC-5 (PET)

Huaytará is a town in central Peru, capital of the Huaytará Province, Huancavelica.

On 15 March 2026, the town made national and international news following the death of presidential candidate and trade unionist Napoleón Becerra in a car accident in Huaytará.
