= Orcococha (Huancavelica) =

Lake in Peru

- Location within Peru Location within South America
- Interactive map of Orcococha
- Coordinates: 13.218°S 75.154°W
- Basin countries: Peru
- Surface elevation: 4,625 m (15,174 ft)

Orcococha (possibly from Quechua urqu male; mountain, qucha lake, "mountain lake" or "male lake") is a lake in Peru located in the Huancavelica Region, Castrovirreyna Province, Santa Ana District, and in the Huaytará Province, Pilpichaca District. It is situated east of Lake Choclococha and northwest of the smaller lake named Caracocha.

== See also ==
- List of lakes in Peru
