= Lake Choclococha =

Choclococha
- Location within Peru
- Location: Huancavelica Region
- Coordinates: 13°10′0″S 75°4′0″W
- Basin countries: Peru
- Surface elevation: 4,521 m (14,833 ft)

Choclococha
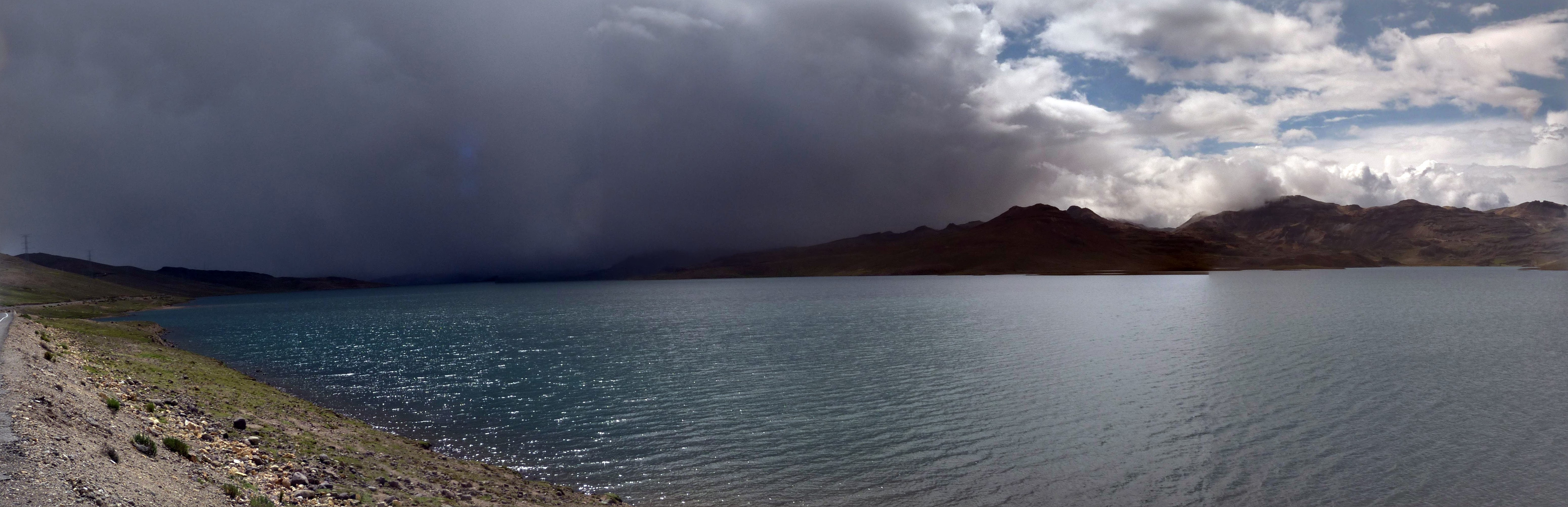

- Location within Peru
- Country: Peru

Dam and spillways
- Height: 12 m (39 ft)
- Length: 280 m (920 ft)

Reservoir
- Total capacity: 17,000,000 m^{3} (14,000 acre⋅ft)

Choclococha (possibly from Quechua chuqllu corncob, qucha lake, "corncob lake") is a large lake in the Huancavelica Region of Peru. It is situated in the Castrovirreyna Province, Santa Ana District and in the Huaytará Province, Pilpichaca District. Choclococha lies east of a lake named Orcococha and north of Caracocha.

The Choclococha dam was completed in 1960. It is 280 m (920 ft) long and 12 m (13 yd) tall. The reservoir has a volume of 66,000 m^{3} (54 acre⋅ft) and a capacity of 17,000,000 m^{3} (14,000 acre⋅ft).

== See also ==
- List of lakes in Peru
