= Wakan Q'allay =

Mountain in Peru

- Location within Peru

Highest point
- Elevation: 5,100 m (16,700 ft)
- Coordinates: 13°16′31″S 74°48′05″W

Geography
- Location: Peru, Huancavelica Region
- Parent range: Andes

Wakan Q'allay (Quechua, waka cow, -n a suffix, q'allay to cut into small pieces, Hispanicized spelling Huajancallay) is a mountain in the Andes of Peru, about 5,100 m (16,732 ft) high. It is situated in the Huancavelica Region, Huaytará Province, Pilpichaca District. Wakan Q'allay lies east of Qispi Q'awa.
