= Huarmicocha (Huancavelica) =

Lake in Peru

- Location within Peru
- Location: Huancavelica Region
- Coordinates: 12°42′32″S 75°31′37″W
- Basin countries: Peru

Huarmicocha (possibly from Quechua warmi woman, wife, qucha lake, "woman's lake") is a large lake in Peru located in the Huancavelica Region, Huancavelica Province, Acobambilla District.

== See also ==
- List of lakes in Peru
- Millococha
