= Department of Huancavelica =

Department of Peru

Huancavelica Wankawillka (Quechua)
- Department
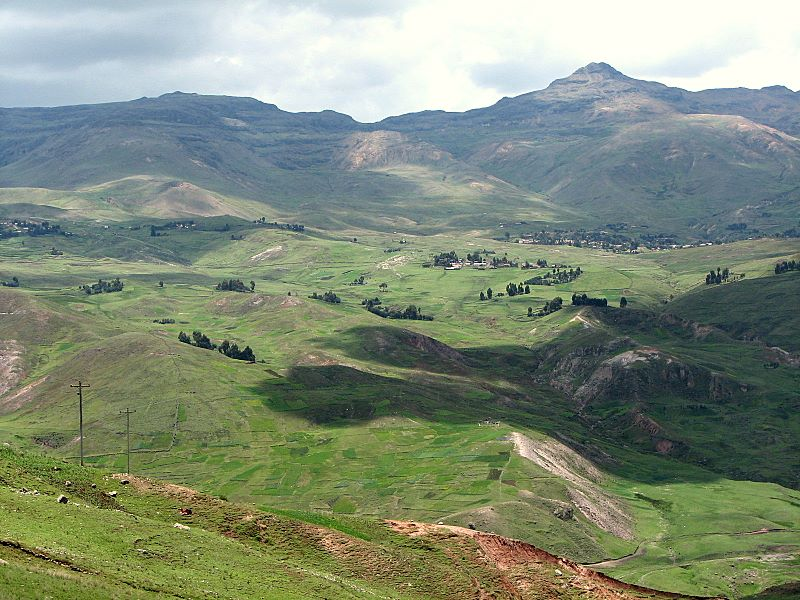

- Flag Coat of arms

- Location of Huancavelica within Peru
- Coordinates: 13.02°S 75.09°W
- Country: Peru
- Established: April 26, 1822
- Capital: Huancavelica
- Provinces: List: Acobamba; Angaraes; Castrovirreyna; Churcampa; Huancavelica; Huaytará; Tayacaja

Government
  - Type: Regional Government
  - Governor: Maciste Díaz Abad

Area
  - Total: 22,131.47 km^{2} (8,545.01 sq mi)

Population (2025 census)
  - Total: 371,909
  - Density: 16.8045/km^{2} (43.5235/sq mi)
- Demonym: huancavelicano/a
- UBIGEO: 09
- ISO 3166 code: PE-HUV
- Website: www.regionhuancavelica.gob.pe

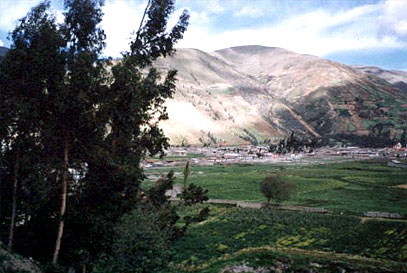
View of Pampas in the Tayacaja province

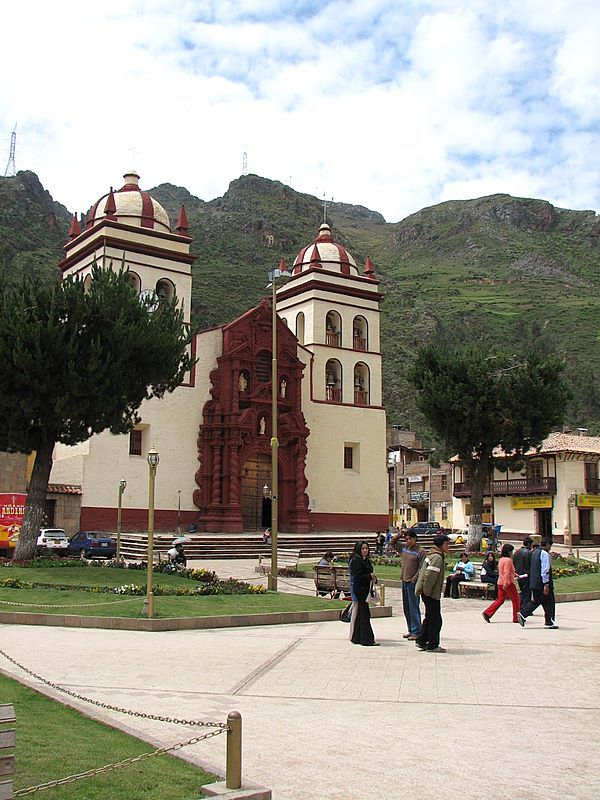
The cathedral of Huancavelica

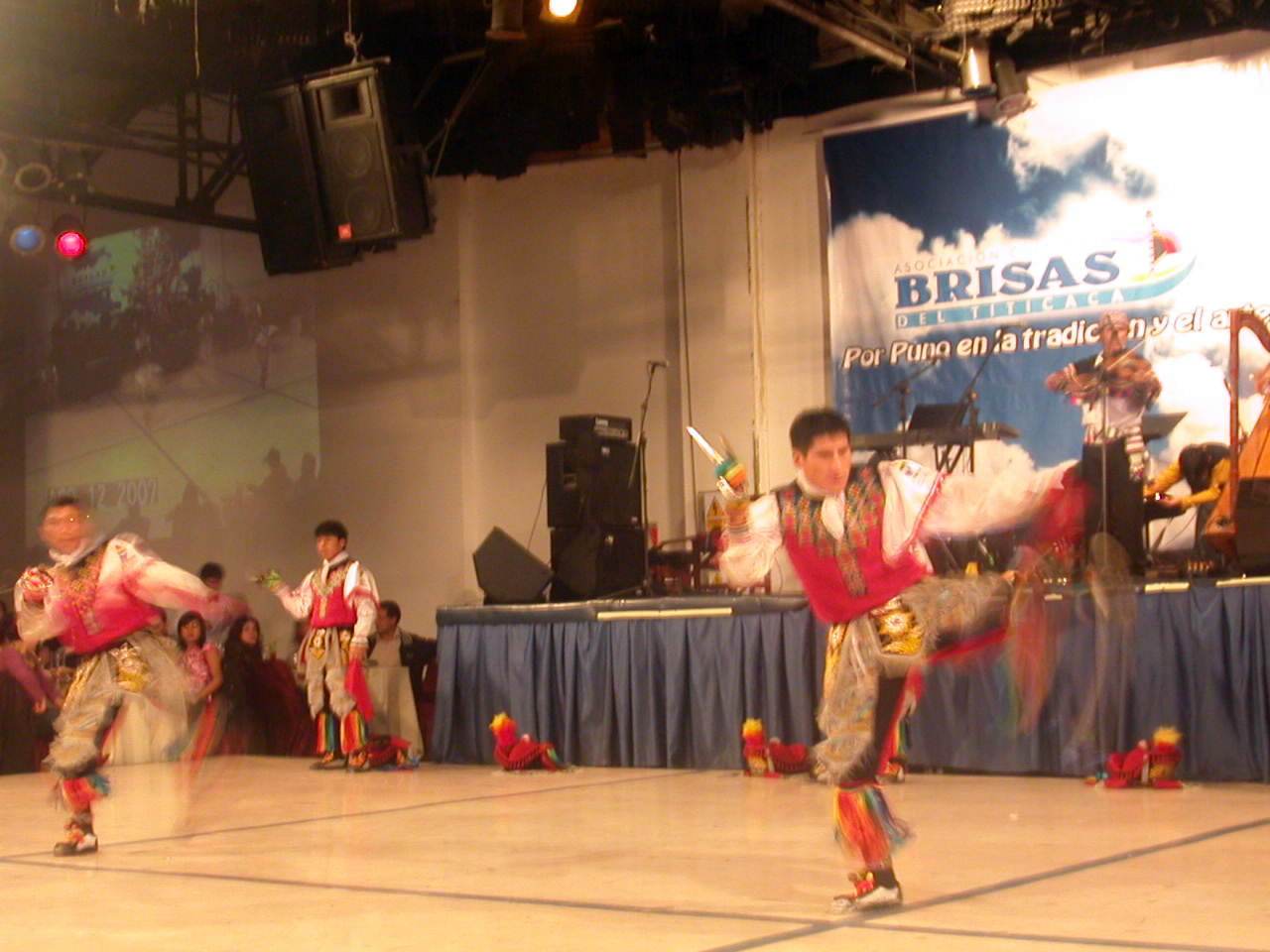
Scissors Dancers in a regional dance

Huancavelica (Spanish pronunciation: [waŋkaβeˈlika]; Quechua: Wankawillka) is a department of Peru. It is bordered by the departments of Lima and Ica in the west, Junín in the north, and Ayacucho in the east. It has an area of 22,131.47 km^{2} (8,545.01 sq mi) and a population of 371,909 (2025 census). It is administered by a regional government. Its capital is the city of Huancavelica.

== History ==
The department was created by the Reglamento Provisional de Elecciones, published on April 26, 1822, which established the department of Huancavelica alongside those of Arequipa, Cuzco, Huamanga and Puno.

== Political division ==
Map of provinces

The department is divided into seven provinces.

Province (Capital)

1. Acobamba Province (Acobamba)
2. Angaraes Province (Lircay)
3. Castrovirreyna Province (Castrovirreyna)
4. Churcampa Province (Churcampa)
5. Huancavelica Province (Huancavelica)
6. Huaytará Province (Huaytará)
7. Tayacaja Province (Pampas)

The main cities are Huancavelica, Pampas and Lircay. There are many little districts like Querco in Huancavelica. Querco is a nice little town. Most of the residents are agricultors. They own cattle, sheep, pigs, horses, mules, llamas, goats, chickens, and donkeys.

== Demographics ==
The region is mostly inhabited by indigenous people of Quechua descent.

=== Languages ===
According to the 2007 Peru Census, the language learnt first by most of the residents was Quechua (64.03%) followed by Spanish (35.67%). The Quechua variety spoken in Huancavelica is Chanka Quechua. The following table shows the results concerning the language learnt first in the department of Huancavelica by province:

Province	Quechua	Aymara	Asháninka	Another native language	Spanish	Foreign language	Deaf or mute	Total
Acobamba	51,338	49	11	10	8,261	-	78	59,747
Angaraes	40,669	62	7	7	10,922	-	56	51,723
Castrovirreyna	4,093	14	1	3	14,168	-	73	18,352
Churcampa	33,025	27	4	19	8,542	3	127	41,747
Huancavelica	73,340	117	28	13	59,544	4	157	133,203
Huaytara	5,670	13	4	3	16,218	2	28	21,938
Tayacaja	63,950	91	23	15	33,900	1	242	98,222
Total	272,085	373	78	70	151,555	10	761	424,932
%	64.03	0.09	0.02	0.02	35.67	0.00	0.18	100.00

== Education ==
The National University of Huancavelica is the only university in the region and it has branches in Pampas, Lircay, Acobamba and Castrovirreyna.

== Health ==
The region has two hospitals located in Huancavelica and Pampas. There are clinics and medical post in most of the towns.

== Transportation ==
The region is connected with the neighboring regions by national roads, which are paved in most cases. There are regional and local roads that are serving the towns of the regions. Huancavelica has a train service with the city of Huancayo.

== Notable natives ==
- Lina Medina, world's youngest mother

== Authorities ==
- Governor: Rubén Alva Ochoa (2015–2018)

== See also ==
- Aknuqucha
- Chunta mountain range
- Chuqlluqucha
- Inka Wasi
- Urququcha
- Warmiqucha
