= Chota, Peru =

Chota
- Town
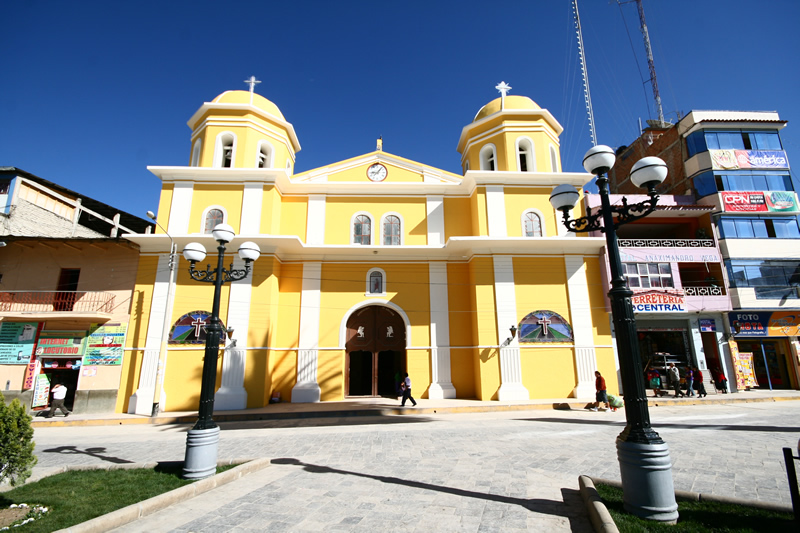
- Cathedral of Chota

- Location within Peru
- Coordinates: 6°33′41″S 78°38′55″W
- Country: Peru
- Region: Cajamarca
- Province: Chota
- District: Chota

Government
  - Mayor: Werner Cabrera Campos

Area
  - Total: 392.47 km^{2} (151.53 sq mi)
- Elevation: 2,388 m (7,835 ft)

Population (2017)
  - Total: 47,279
  - Density: 120.47/km^{2} (312.00/sq mi)
- Time zone: UTC-5 (PET)

Chota is a town in Northern Peru, capital of the province Chota in the region Cajamarca. The city is the seat of the Territorial Prelature of Chota.

== Etymology ==
German researcher Ernst Middendorf, in his studies of ancient Peruvian languages, linked the city's name to the Aymara term chuta, meaning "milestone," "landmark," or "boundary stone" (Markstein). According to Middendorf, this toponym is part of a series of Aymara names distributed throughout the northern Peruvian highlands (such as those ending in -marca), which would explain its presence in various parts of the Andean highlands and its absence in the coastal region. (Note: Non-academic hypotheses have been proposed regarding a possible origin of the word Chota in the Mochica language. These interpretations lack consensus in specialized literature and are considered folk etymologies.)

== Homonymous toponyms ==
The toponym Chota is distributed across various localities in Peru, according to historical and census geographical sources:

=== Amazonas ===
- Luya Province – Luya District: Chota6°10′20″S 78°01′52″W
- Utcubamba Province – Bagua Grande District: San Juan de Chota. 5°52′41″S 78°27′05″W

=== Ancash ===
- Pallasca Province – La Pampa District: Chota, lands.

=== Arequipa ===
- Caravelí Province – Chaparra District: Chota15°44′59.5″S 73°51′52.5″W
- Caylloma Province – Tuti and Sibayo districts: Chota, ranch. In Paz Soldán's Dictionary (1877), it is recorded as Chuta.
- La Unión Province – Charcana District: Chota, lands. 15°13′31″S 73°03′59″W

=== Ayacucho ===
- Lucanas Province – Saisa District: Chota 14°59′24″S 74°21′29″W
- Parinacochas Province – Pullo District: Chota 15°20′35″S 74°01′06″W

=== Cajamarca ===
- Cajamarca Province – Jesús District: Chotabamba, farmstead.

=== Cusco ===
- Calca Province – Pisac District: Chota, village and ranch. In the book Los Pueblos del Perú (1905), it is recorded as Chuta.

=== Huancavelica ===
- Castrovirreyna Province – Mollepampa District: Chota.
- Castrovirreyna Province – San Juan District: Chota 13°09′50″S 75°39′30″W

=== Huánuco ===
- Huánuco Province – Chinchao District: Chotabamba, estate.
- Marañón Province – Cholón District: San Pedro de Chota.

=== La Libertad ===
- Otuzco Province – Agallpampa District: Chota, estate located at 2,640 m a.s.l. 7°56′02″S 78°28′50″W
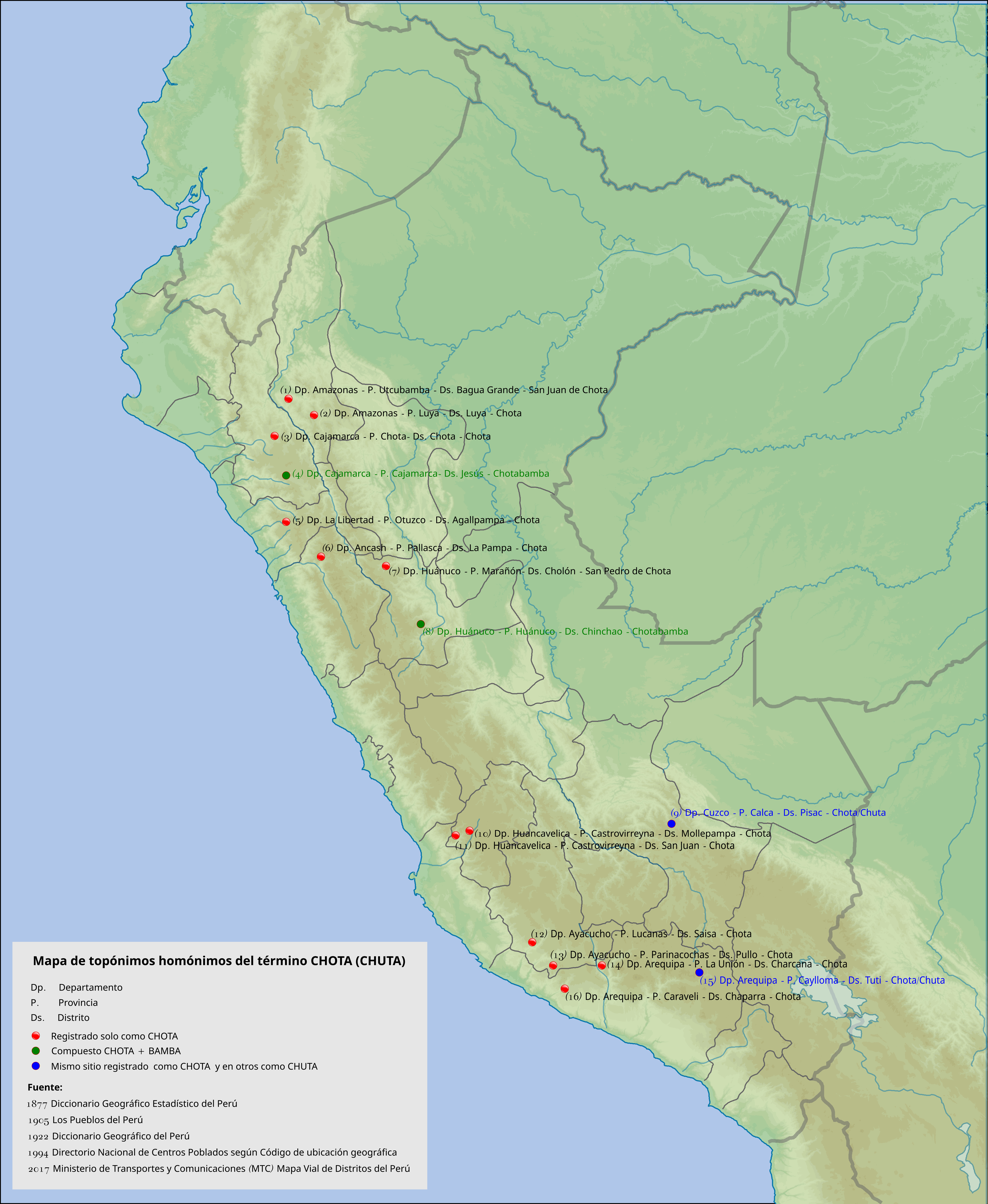
Distribution map of the toponym Chota (and its variant Chuta) in Peru. Its prevalence in the Andean highlands is visible across the departments of Amazonas, Áncash, Arequipa, Ayacucho, Cajamarca, Cusco, Huancavelica, Huánuco, and La Libertad.

== Geography ==
Chota is located 150 km (93 mi) north of Cajamarca and 215 km (134 mi) east of Chiclayo. It lies at 2,388 m (7,835 ft) above sea level on the Acunta plateau, on the eastern slope of the Andes. The city is bounded on three sides by rivers of the westernmost Amazon basin: to the north is the San Mateo, to the east the Colpamayo. Both flow broadly westward into the Rio Chotano, which forms Chota's south-western boundary.

=== Climate ===
The city generally has a temperate climate. The rainfalls are due to El Niño cyclically because of the proximity to the Equator and for being a city in thermal ground floor. It has a mild winter and a hot and rainy summer from November to April. The average temperature is 17.8 °C.

== Festivals ==
The main festival of the city is the San Juan Bautista festival. It starts on June 13 with the triumphal entry in a procession, bearing to June 24 as the central day. The activities that are carried out are:

- The Identity of the Chotanos Day, held on 22 June, which pays tribute to José Manuel Silva and Anaximando Becerra Vega Mateola, independence hero and poet respectively. Both are famous people of Chota.
- The festival of Sanjuanpampa, held at the farm of Corepuquio where festivals and concerts on 23 and 24 of June are performed. Also held here cultural events, typical dishes, dances, Paso horse contests, bullfights, motocross and soccer, but in daytime hours.
- The election of the beauty "Flor de Chota", where ladies compete from all the villages and towns of the district of Chota. It takes place in two phases: qualifying and the grand final on 23 and 24 June respectively.
- On the days 25, 26 and 27 of June, bullfights are held with international cartel in the famous Plaza de toros El Vizcaino, the second largest in Peru after the Plaza de toros de Acho in Lima. For this reason it is considered the Bullfighting Capital of Northern Peru.
