= Quri Punchu =

Mountain in Peru

- Location within Peru

Highest point
- Elevation: 4,400 m (14,400 ft)
- Coordinates: 14°43′35″S 73°51′23″W

Geography
- Location: Peru, Ayacucho Region, Lucanas Province
- Parent range: Andes

Quri Punchu (Quechua quri gold, punchu poncho, "gold poncho", also spelled Ccoripunchu) or is a mountain in the Andes of Peru, about 4,400 metres (14,436 ft) high. It is situated in the Ayacucho Region, Lucanas Province, Puquio District. Quri Punchu lies southeast of two larger lakes named Apiñaqucha and Pukaqucha.
