= Quchapampa =

Quchapampa may refer to:

- Quchapampa (Ayacucho), a lake in Peru
- Quchapampa (Lima), a lake in Peru

== See also ==
- Cochabamba
