= Inka Wasi (Lucanas) =

Mountain in Peru

- Location within Peru

Highest point
- Elevation: 4,400 m (14,400 ft)
- Coordinates: 14°27′46″S 74°09′21″W

Geography
- Location: Peru, Ayacucho Region, Lucanas Province
- Parent range: Andes

Inka Wasi (Quechua inka Inca, wasi house, "Inca house", hispanicized spelling Incahuasi) is a mountain in the Andes of Peru, about 4,400 metres (14,436 ft) high. It is situated in the Ayacucho Region, Lucanas Province, Cabana District. It lies south of Anqasi and northeast of Misapata.
