= Misapata =

Misapata may refer to:

- Misapata (Cabana), a mountain in the Andes of Peru
- Misapata (Cabana-Lucanas), a mountain in the Andes of Peru
