= Inka Paqcha =

Mountain in Peru

- Location within Peru

Highest point
- Elevation: 4,400 m (14,400 ft)
- Coordinates: 14°30′36″S 74°02′33″W

Geography
- Location: Peru, Ayacucho Region, Lucanas Province
- Parent range: Andes

Inka Paqcha (Quechua Inka Inca, phaqcha, locally paqcha, waterfall, "Inca waterfall", also spelled Incapaccha) is a mountain in the Andes of Peru, about 4,400 metres (14,436 ft) high. It is located in the Ayacucho Region, Lucanas Province, Carmen Salcedo District. Inka Paqcha lies northwest of Inka Pallanka where the archaeological site of Quriwayrachina is situated.
