= Cochabamba (disambiguation) =

Cochabamba (in Hispanicized spelling) or Quchapampa (Quechua qucha lake, pampa a large plain, "lake plain") may refer to:

== Geography ==
- Cochabamba, a major city in Bolivia
- Cochabamba Department, one of the nine departments that make up Bolivia
- Cochabamba Municipality, Bolivia
- Cochabamba District, Chota, one of the nineteen districts in Chota Province, Peru
- Cochabamba District, Huacaybamba, one of the four districts in Huacaybamba Province, Peru
- Cochabamba District, Huaraz, one of the twelve districts in Huaraz District, Peru
- Cochabamba Valley, a valley in Bolivia that contains the city of Cochabamba
- Cordillera de Cochabamba, a mountain range in Bolivia
- Cochapamba Parish, Cotopaxi, in Saquisilí Canton, Cotopaxi Province, Ecuador
- Cochapamba Parish, Pichincha, in Quito Canton, Pichincha Province, Ecuador
- Quchapampa, Amazonas, an archaeological site in the Amazonas Region, Peru
- Quchapampa (Ayacucho), a lake in the Ayacucho Region, Peru
- Quchapampa (Lima), a lake in the Lima Region, Peru

== Animals ==
- Cochabamba mountain-finch, a finch that is endemic to the Cochabamba Department, Bolivia
- Cochabamba grass mouse, a rodent endemic to Bolivia
- Colibri de Cochabamba, another name for the wedge-tailed hillstar a hummingbird native to Bolivia and Argentina
- Cochabamba (beetle), a genus of beetles in the tribe Luperini

== Institutions ==
- Cochabamba Cooperative School an English-language international school located in Cochabamba, Bolivia
- Cochabamba Bolivia Temple, the 82nd LDS temple, located in Cochabamba, Bolivia
- Cochabamba Cathedral, an 18th-century cathedral in Cochabamba, Bolivia

== Miscellaneous ==
- Cochabamba social unrest of 2007 was an event in Bolivian history
- Cochabamba-Santa Cruz Highway an important road built in the 1950s with U.S. aid
- 2000 Cochabamba protests also known as the "Cochabamba Water Wars", were a series of protests that took place in Cochabamba, Bolivia's third largest city, between January and April 2000 because of the privatization of the municipal water supply.
