= Chunta (Ayacucho) =

Mountain in Peru

- Location within Peru

Highest point
- Elevation: 4,800 m (15,700 ft)
- Coordinates: 14°25′20″S 73°51′26″W

Geography
- Location: Peru, Ayacucho Region
- Parent range: Andes

Chunta (Aymara for prolonged, lengthened, Quechua for a kind of palm, also spelled Chonta) is a mountain in the Andes of Peru, about 4,800 m (15,748 ft) high. Chunta is situated in the Ayacucho Region, Lucanas Province, Chipao District. Chunta lies north of Waytayuq and southeast of Pichqaqucha.
