= Lake Sahuaccocha =

Lake in Peru

- Location within Peru
- Location: Peru; Ayacucho Region
- Coordinates: 14°34′46.1″S 73°54′4.7″W
- Surface elevation: 4,386 m (14,390 ft)

Lake Sahuaccocha (Quechua sawa marriage, qucha lake) is a lake in Peru located in the Ayacucho Region, Lucanas Province, Chipao District. It is situated at a height of about 4,386 metres (14,390 ft). Sawaqucha lies northeast of the lakes named Yawriwiri, Urqunqucha and Kunturqucha, northwest of Tipiqucha, Pukaqucha, another lake named Urqunqucha (slightly smaller than the lake mentioned before) and Islaqucha, and north of Lake Apiñaccocha.

== See also ==
- List of lakes in Peru
