= Intendancy of Huamanga =

Intendancy of the Spanish Empire

Intendencia de Guamanga
- Intendancy of the Spanish Empire
- 1784–1824
- Coat of arms

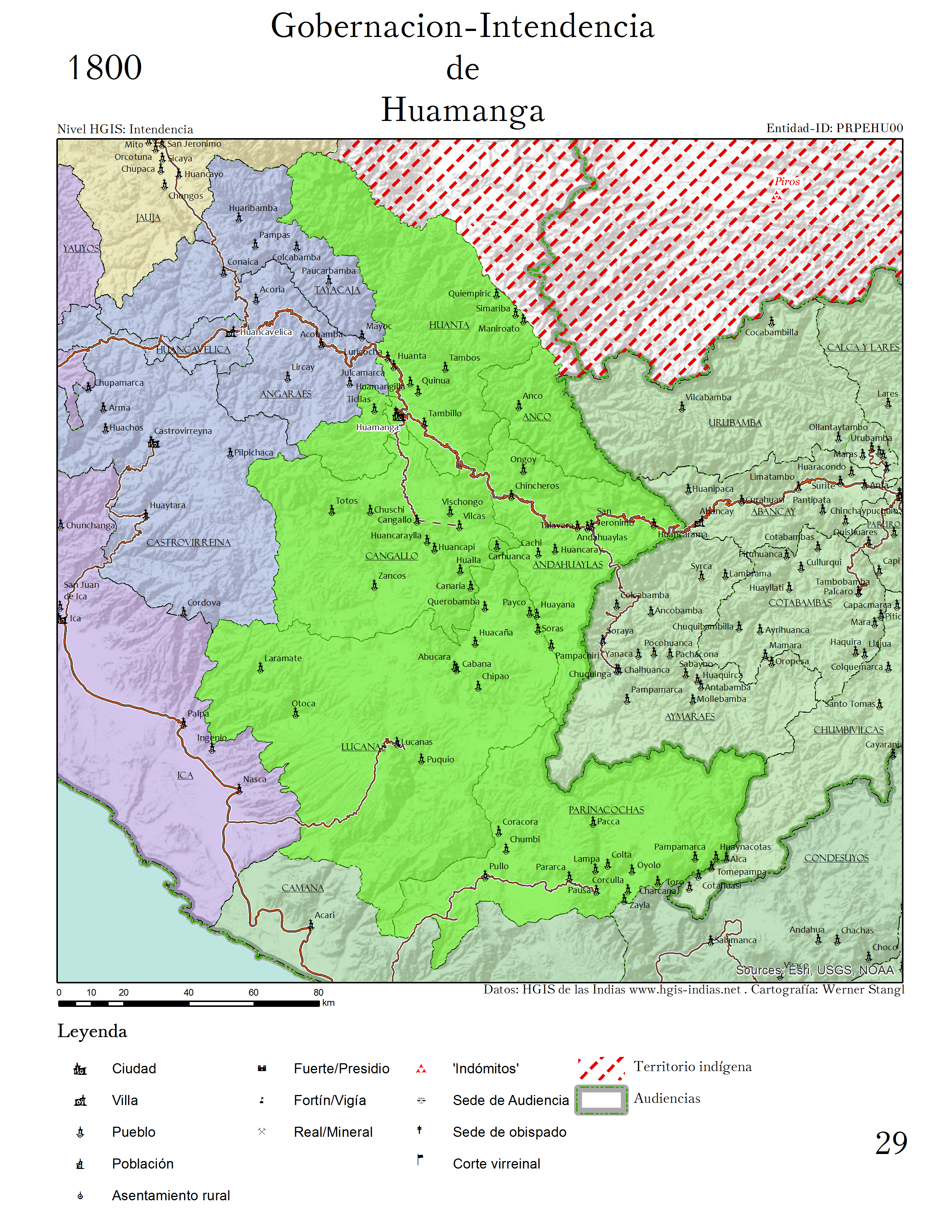
- Capital: Huamanga
- Government
- Intendant
  - 1784–1786: Nicolás Manrique de Lara, Marquis of Lara (first)
  - 1823–1824: José Montenegro (last)
- Historical era: Viceroyalty of Peru
  - Established: 1784
  - Dissolved: 9 December 1824
- Subdivisions
  - Type: Partidos
  - Units: See relevant section
Succeeded by
Department of Huamanga

The Intendancy of Huamanga (Spanish: Intendencia de Huamanga, formerly Guamanga), also known informally as Huamanga Province (Spanish: Provincia de Huamanga (Guamanga)), was one of the territorial divisions of the Viceroyalty of Peru, ruled from the city of Guamanga and under the jurisdiction of the Bishopric of Huamanga. It was created in 1784 and was the site of the Battle of Ayacucho, a decisive moment in the Peruvian War of Independence that ended the viceroyalty's existence. It was ultimately replaced by the Department of Ayacucho in 1825.

== History ==
It was created in 1784 and was phased out starting on April 26, 1822, with the creation of the Department of Huamanga within the Protectorate of Peru, later renamed to Ayacucho in 1825. The intendancy was dissolved alongside the viceroyalty after the Battle of Ayacucho on December 9, 1824.

== Subdivisions ==
The intendancy was divided into the following 7 parts, called "Partidos":

Partido	Head (city of government)
Cercado de Guamanga	San Juan de la Frontera de Huamanga
Guanta	Huanta
Andahuaylas	Andahuaylas
Lucanas	Villa de San Juan
Parinacochas	Parinacochas
Anco	Anco
Vilcashuamán / Cangallo	Cangallo

== Intendants ==
The governors (intendants) were:

- Nicolás Manrique de Lara, Marquis of Lara, contador mayor (1784–1786)
- José Melendez Escalada, director general de aduanas (1786–1799)
- Demetrio O'Higgins, Colonel (1799–1813)
- Francisco de Paula Pruna, assessor lieutenant (1813–1815, interim)
- Narciso Basagoytia, Colonel (1815–1817)
- Manuel Quimper (1817–1819)
- Francisco José de Recabarren, Maestrante de Sevilla (1819–1821)
- Gabriel de Herboso (1821–1823)
- José Montenegro y Ubalde, Brigadier (1823–1824)

== See also ==
- Department of Ayacucho
