= Capilla =

Capilla may refer to:

- A medieval Spanish term for a chapel
- Capilla, Badajoz, Spain
- Capillas, Castile and León, Spain
- Capillas District, Peru
- La Capilla, Colombia

== People ==
- Doug Capilla (born 1952), American baseball player
- Eneko Capilla (born 1995), Spanish footballer
- Joaquín Capilla (1928–2010), Mexican diver
