= Islaqucha =

Lake in Peru

- Location within Peru
- Location: Peru; Ayacucho Region
- Coordinates: 14°38′51″S 73°52′06″W

Islaqucha (Spanish isla island, Quechua qucha lake, Hispanicized spelling Islaccocha) is a lake in Peru located in the Ayacucho Region, Lucanas Province, in the districts of Chipao and Pukyu. Islaqucha lies north of Pukaqucha and west of Apiñaqucha.

== See also ==
- List of lakes in Peru
