= Misa Q'asa =

Mountain in Peru

- Location within Peru

Highest point
- Elevation: 4,400 m (14,400 ft)
- Coordinates: 14°17′23″S 74°09′52″W

Geography
- Location: Peru, Ayacucho Region
- Parent range: Andes

Misa Q'asa (Quechua misa table, q'asa mountain pass, literally "table mountain pass", Hispanicized spelling Mesa Jasa) is a mountain in the Andes of Peru, about 4,400 m (14,436 ft) high. It is located in the Ayacucho Region, Lucanas Province, on the border of the districts of Aucara and Cabana. Misa Q'asa lies west of Misa Urqu and northeast of the archaeological site of Usqunta.
