= Misa Urqu (Ayacucho) =

Mountain in Peru

- Location within Peru

Highest point
- Elevation: 4,400 m (14,400 ft)
- Coordinates: 14°17′21″S 74°07′40″W

Geography
- Location: Peru, Ayacucho Region
- Parent range: Andes

Misa Urqu (Quechua misa table, urqu mountain, literally "table mountain", Hispanicized spelling Mesaorjo) is a mountain in the Andes of Peru, about 4,400 m (14,436 ft) high. It is located in the Ayacucho Region, Lucanas Province, on the border of the districts of Aucara and Cabana. Misa Urqu lies northeast of the archaeological site of Usqunta and east of Misa Q'asa.
