= Pampa Galeras – Barbara D'Achille National Reserve =

Protected area in Peru

Coordinates: 14.693°S 74.369°W

- Reserva Nacional Pampa Galeras – Barbara D’Achille
- IUCN category VI (protected area with sustainable use of natural resources)
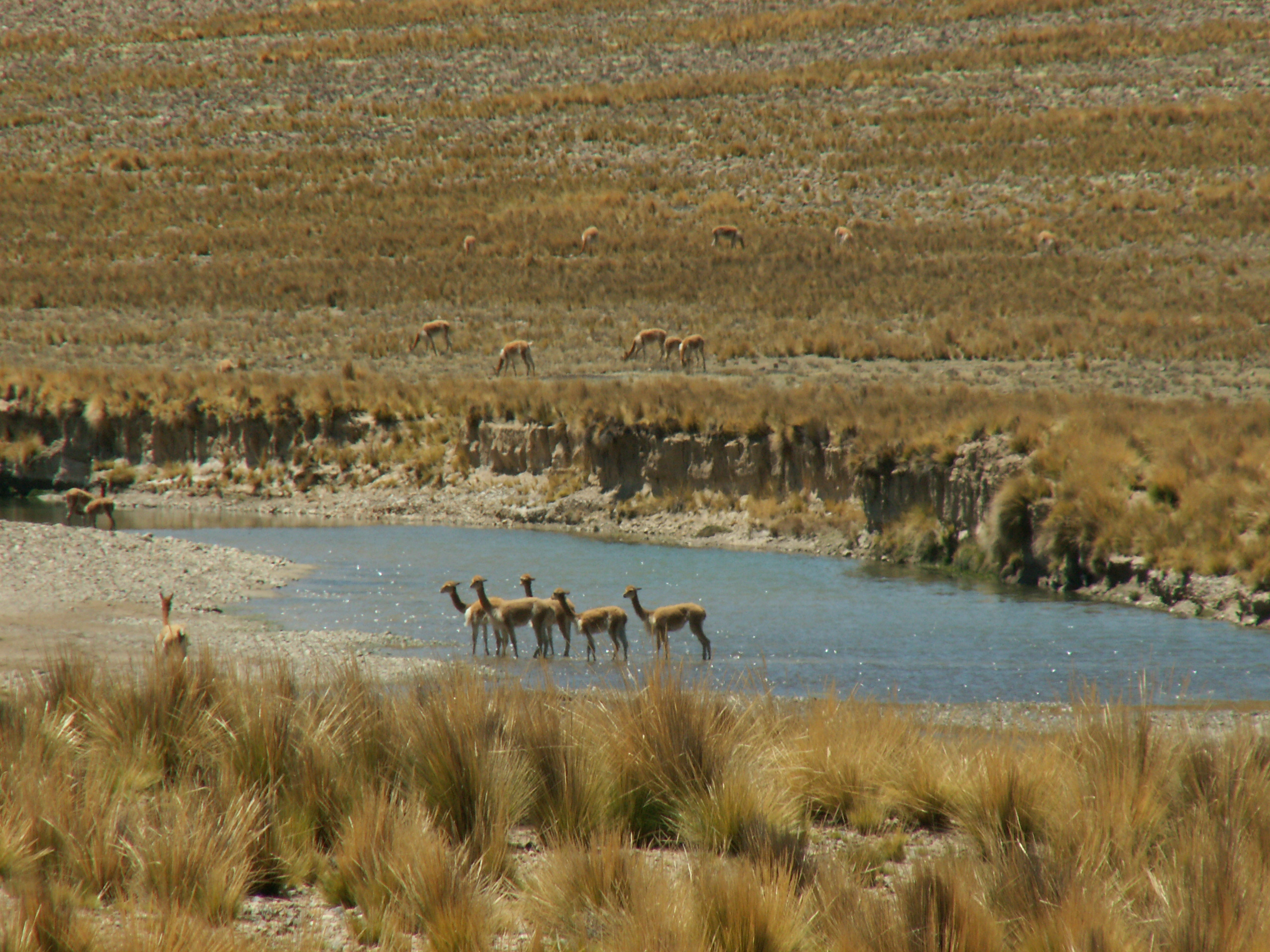
- Vicuñas in Pampa Galeras
- Interactive map of Pampa Galeras – Barbara D'Achille National Reserve
- Location: Ayacucho, Peru
- Area: 65 km^{2} (25 sq mi)

Pampa Galeras – Barbara D'Achille is located in the Lucanas Province of the Ayacucho Region in Peru. Its main purpose is to protect the habitat of the vicuña. The park is named after Barbara D'Achille, a Letonian conservationist who was murdered by the Shining Path leftist terrorists in 1989.

== Chaku festival ==
Every June 24 at the Chaku festival (Quechua chaku hunt) hundreds of people trap the vicuñas with a big fence and a long rope. The vicuñas are driven into a corner where they can be sheared after the performance of a dance called Supaypa wasin tusuq (Quechua for "dancer of the devil's house", also known as danza de tijeras (Spanish for scissors dance)) and an Inca ceremony. The dance and the ceremony are probably performed as a pledge to the gods that the gods will agree with taking the crop. Vicuñas give the most precious vicuña wool.

== See also ==
- T'urpuqucha
