= Qarwa Uqhu =

Mountain in Peru

- Location within Peru

Highest point
- Elevation: 4,600 m (15,100 ft)
- Coordinates: 14°27′23″S 73°50′30″W

Geography
- Location: Peru, Ayacucho Region, Lucanas Province
- Parent range: Andes

Qarwa Uqhu (Quechua qarwa pale, yellowish, golden, uqhu swamp, "yellowish swamp", hispanicized spelling Carhua Ojo) is a mountain in the Andes of Peru, about 4,600 metres (15,092 ft) high. It is located in the Ayacucho Region, Lucanas Province, Chipao District, southeast of Waytayuq.
