= Leoncio Prado =

Leoncio Prado may refer to:

== Places ==
- Leoncio Prado Province, a province in the Huánuco Region of Peru
- Leoncio Prado District, Huaura, a district of the Huaura province, Peru
- Leoncio Prado District, Lucanas, a district of the Lucanas province, Peru

== People ==
- Leoncio Prado Gutiérrez (1853–1883), Peruvian mariner
