= Llauta District =

Coordinates: 14°41′38″S 74°07′27″W

Llauta
- District
- Interactive map of Llauta
- Country: Peru
- Region: Ayacucho
- Province: Lucanas
- Founded: April 8, 1929
- Capital: Llauta

Government
  - Mayor: Zacarias David Roca Caso

Area
  - Total: 482.07 km^{2} (186.13 sq mi)
- Elevation: 2,667 m (8,750 ft)

Population (2005 census)
  - Total: 1,573
  - Density: 3.263/km^{2} (8.451/sq mi)
- Time zone: UTC-5 (PET)
- UBIGEO: 050610

Llauta District is one of twenty-one districts of the Lucanas Province in Peru.

== Geography ==
One of the highest mountains of the district is Hatun Kunturillu at approximately 4,400 m (14,400 ft). Other mountains are listed below:

- Arpa Rumi
- Atuq Urqu
- Chuqllu
- Illachayuq
- Illayuq
- Kintu Qaqa
- Mawk'a Llaqta
- Pukara
- Puma Ranra
- Qullpa Mach'ay
- Q'ala Urqu
- Q'illu Sura
- Rit'i Qaqa
- Silla Q'asa
- Urqun Kancha
- Wamanripayuq
- Warawara
- Wawqiyuq
- Winku P'ukru
- Yana Chaka
- Yana Qaqa
- Yana Sura
