= Castrovirreyna =

- Town
- Location within Peru
- Coordinates: 13°16′58″S 75°19′08″W
- Country: Peru
- Region: Huancavelica
- Province: Castrovirreyna
- District: Castrovirreyna
- Time zone: UTC-5 (PET)

Castrovirreyna is a town in central Peru, capital of Castrovirreyna Province in Huancavelica Region.

== Climate ==
Climate data for San Juan de Castrovirreyna, elevation 1,856 m (6,089 ft), (1991–2020)
Month	Jan	Feb	Mar	Apr	May	Jun	Jul	Aug	Sep	Oct	Nov	Dec	Year
Mean daily maximum °C (°F)	23.7 (74.7)	23.3 (73.9)	23.7 (74.7)	24.5 (76.1)	25.0 (77.0)	24.7 (76.5)	24.8 (76.6)	24.7 (76.5)	24.8 (76.6)	24.7 (76.5)	24.6 (76.3)	24.2 (75.6)	24.4 (75.9)
Mean daily minimum °C (°F)	13.0 (55.4)	13.9 (57.0)	14.1 (57.4)	13.2 (55.8)	12.4 (54.3)	11.5 (52.7)	11.5 (52.7)	11.7 (53.1)	12.0 (53.6)	12.1 (53.8)	12.4 (54.3)	12.7 (54.9)	12.5 (54.6)
Average precipitation mm (inches)	50.4 (1.98)	53.6 (2.11)	53.1 (2.09)	10.5 (0.41)	0.9 (0.04)	0 (0)	0 (0)	0.3 (0.01)	1.0 (0.04)	5.0 (0.20)	6.4 (0.25)	18.7 (0.74)	199.9 (7.87)
Source: National Meteorology and Hydrology Service of Peru
