= San Cristóbal District, Lucanas =

District in the Lucanas Province, Peru

Coordinates: 14°41′38″S 74°07′27″W

San Cristóbal
- District
- Interactive map of San Cristóbal
- Country: Peru
- Region: Ayacucho
- Province: Lucanas
- Founded: March 25, 1986
- Capital: San Cristóbal

Government
  - Mayor: Luis Paulino Rojas Alfaro

Area
  - Total: 391.83 km^{2} (151.29 sq mi)
- Elevation: 3,550 m (11,650 ft)

Population (2005 census)
  - Total: 2,097
  - Density: 5.352/km^{2} (13.86/sq mi)
- Time zone: UTC-5 (PET)
- UBIGEO: 050615

San Cristóbal District is one of twenty-one districts of the province Lucanas in Peru.

== Ethnic groups ==
The people in the district are mainly indigenous citizens of Quechua descent. Quechua is the language which the majority of the population (90.58%) learnt to speak in childhood, 9.19% of the residents started speaking using the Spanish language (2007 Peru Census).

== See also ==
- Ñawpallaqta
- Puka Urqu
