= Waman Pirqa =

Archaeological site in Peru

- Location: Peru, Ayacucho Region, Lucanas Province
- Region: Andes

Waman Pirqa (Quechua waman falcon, pirqa wall, "falcon wall", also spelled Huaman Pirqa, Wamanpirka) is an archaeological site in Peru. It was declared a National Cultural Heritage in 2003. Waman Pirqa lies in the Ayacucho Region, Lucanas Province, Carmen Salcedo District, near Antamarka (Andamarca).
