= Awqa Urqu =

Mountain in Peru

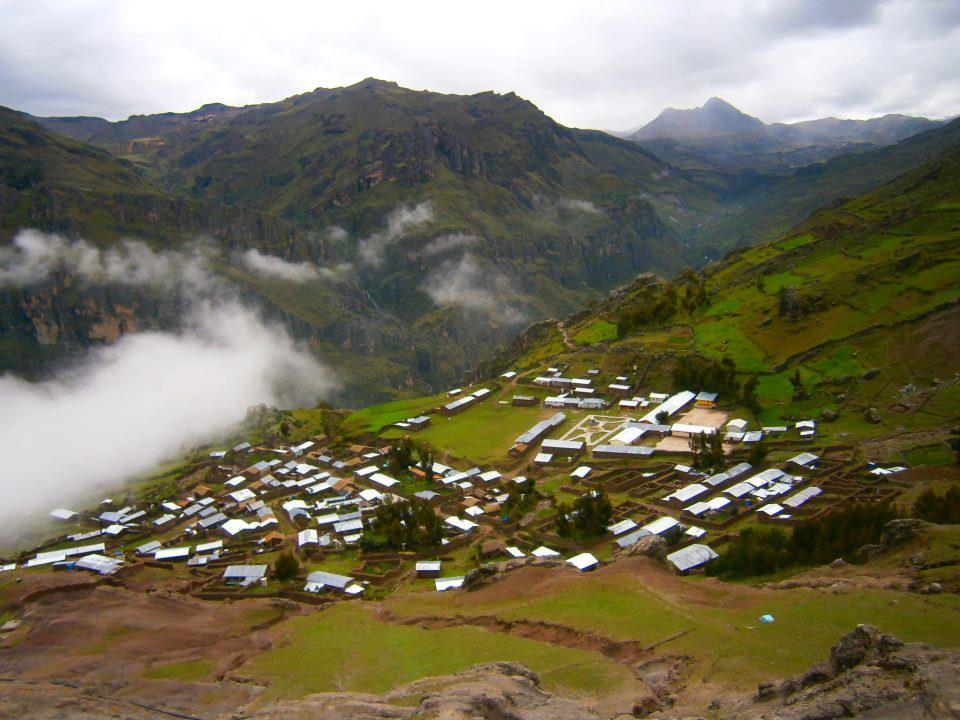
- Awqa Urqu (in the background, on the right) as seen from Cochamarca (Quchamarka) in the southwest

Highest point
- Elevation: 4,982 m (16,345 ft)
- Coordinates: 12°56′45″S 75°25′42″W

Geography
- Location within Peru
- Location: Peru, Huancavelica Region
- Parent range: Andes, Chunta

Awqa Urqu (Quechua awqa enemy, urqu mountain, "enemy mountain", Hispanicized spelling Auca Orjo) is a 4,982-metre-high (16,345 ft) mountain in the Chunta mountain range in the Andes of Peru. It is situated in the Huancavelica Region, Castrovirreyna Province, Aurahuá District. Awqa Urqu lies southeast of Wichinka Lake.
