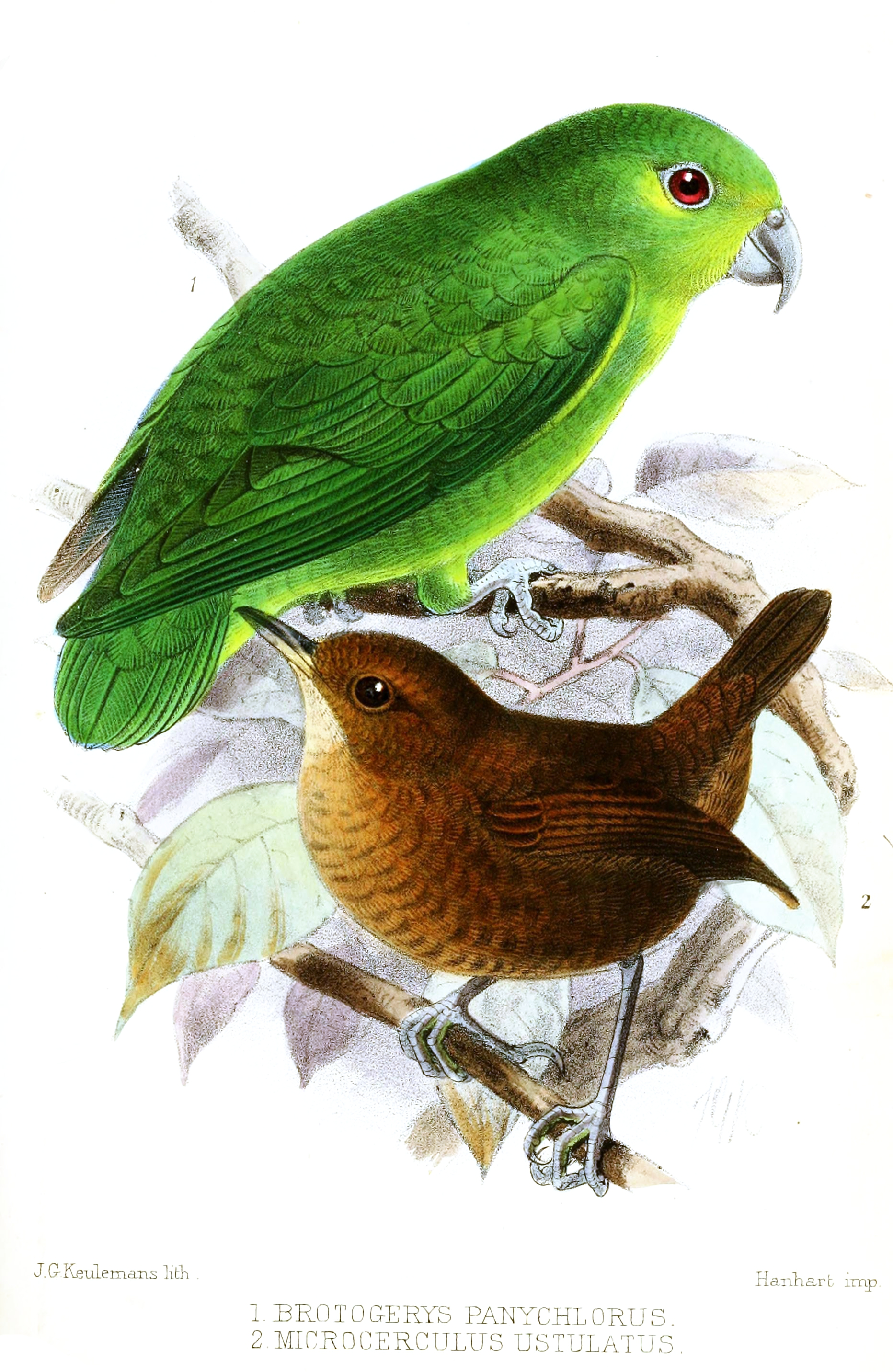
- Illustration of a tepui parrotlet (above) with a flutist wren

Conservation status
- Least Concern (IUCN 3.1)

Scientific classification
- Kingdom: Animalia
- Phylum: Chordata
- Class: Aves
- Order: Psittaciformes
- Family: Psittacidae
- Genus: Nannopsittaca
- Species: N. panychlora

Binomial name
- Nannopsittaca panychlora (Salvin & Godman, 1883)

= Tepui parrotlet =

Species of bird

The tepui parrotlet (Nannopsittaca panychlora) is a species of parrot in the family Psittacidae. It is found in the tepuis of northern Brazil, western Guyana, and southern Venezuela.

== Description ==
It is light green with brown eyes. Its tail is short and round. Its natural habitats are subtropical or tropical moist lowland forest, and subtropical, or tropical moist montane forest from 750 to 2,200 meters elevation.
