= Q'asa Pata =

Archaeological site in Peru

- Location: Peru, Ayacucho Region, Lucanas Province
- Region: Andes

Q'asa Pata (Quechua q'asa mountain pass, pata step, bank of a river, "mountain pass step" or "mountain pass bank", also spelled Ccasapata, Qasa Pata) is an archaeological site in Peru. It was declared a National Cultural Heritage in 2003. Q'asa Pata lies in the Ayacucho Region, Lucanas Province, Aucará District.

== See also ==
- List of mountains in Peru
- Andes
- Geography of Peru
- Archaeological sites in Peru
- Quechua language
