= Puka Urqu (Ayacucho) =

Archaeological site in Peru

- Location within Peru

Highest point
- Elevation: 3,800 m (12,500 ft)
- Coordinates: 14°43′31″S 74°13′40″W

Geography
- Location: Peru, Ayacucho Region
- Parent range: Andes

Puka Urqu (Quechua puka red, urqu mountain, "red mountain", also spelled Pucaorjo, Puka Orqo) is a mountain in the Andes of Peru, about 3,800 m (12,467 ft) high, with an archaeological site of that name on the mountaintop. It is situated in the Ayacucho Region, Lucanas Province, San Cristóbal District, north of San Cristóbal. Puka Urqu lies northwest of the archaeological site of Ñawpallaqta.
