= Parqaqucha =

Lake in Peru

- Location within Peru
- Location: Peru; Ayacucho Region
- Coordinates: 14°23′05″S 74°05′10″W

Parqaqucha (Quechua parqa two separate things which seem to be united, qucha lake, Hispanicized spelling Parjajocha) is a lake in Peru located in the Ayacucho Region, Lucanas Province, Cabana District.

== See also ==
- List of lakes in Peru
