= Arma District =

Coordinates: 12.7850°S 74.9714°W

Arma
- District
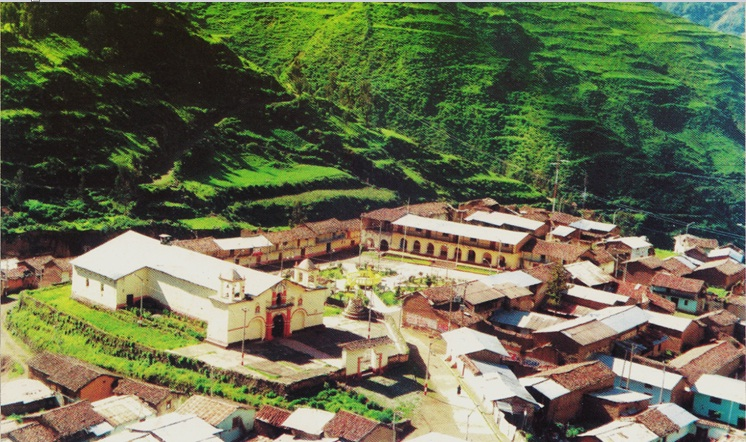
- Interactive map of Arma
- Country: Peru
- Region: Huancavelica
- Province: Castrovirreyna
- Capital: Arma

Area
  - Total: 304.85 km^{2} (117.70 sq mi)
- Elevation: 3,336 m (10,945 ft)

Population (2005 census)
  - Total: 1,596
  - Density: 5.235/km^{2} (13.56/sq mi)
- Time zone: UTC-5 (PET)
- UBIGEO: 090402

Arma District is one of thirteen districts of the Castrovirreyna Province in Peru.
