= Hatun Misapata =

Archaeological site in Peru

- Misapata
- Interactive map of Hatun Misapata
- Location: Peru, Ayacucho Region, Lucanas Province
- Region: Andes

Hatun Misapata or Misapata (Quechua hatun big, misa table, pata elevated place; above, at the top; edge, bank, shore, also spelled Qatun Mesapata or Mesapata) is an archaeological site in the Ayacucho Region in Peru. It was declared a National Cultural Heritage by Resolución Viceministerial Nº 459-2011-VMPCIC-MC of April 20, 2011. Hatun Misapata is situated in the Lucanas Province, Aucara District.
