= Puquio District =

Coordinates: 14°41′38″S 74°07′27″W

Puquio Pukyu
- District
- Interactive map of Puquio
- Country: Peru
- Region: Ayacucho
- Province: Lucanas
- Capital: Puquio

Government
  - Mayor: Pedro Fernando Tincopa Calle

Area
  - Total: 866.43 km^{2} (334.53 sq mi)
- Elevation: 3,214 m (10,545 ft)

Population (2005 census)
  - Total: 15,020
  - Density: 17.34/km^{2} (44.90/sq mi)
- Time zone: UTC-5 (PET)
- UBIGEO: 050601

Puquio District is one of twenty-one districts of the Lucanas Province in Peru.

== Geography ==
One of the highest mountains in the district is Inka Pallanka at approximately 4,600 m (15,100 ft). Other mountains are listed below:

- Amaruyuq
- Aqu Urqu
- Hatun Urqu
- Ichhu
- Kunturillu
- Llallawi
- Puka Pata
- Puka Punchu
- Puka Urqu
- Qiñwa
- Quri Punchu
- Q'illu
- Q'illu Mach'ay
- Sallachayuq
- Saywachayuq
- Tampu
- Urqunqucha
- Waman Pirqa
- Wamanripa
- Yuraq Q'asa
- Yuraq Sayana

Some of the largest lakes of the district are Apiñaqucha, Islaqucha, Pukaqucha and Urqunqucha.

== Climate ==
Climate data for Puquio, elevation 3,176 m (10,420 ft), (1991–2020)
Month	Jan	Feb	Mar	Apr	May	Jun	Jul	Aug	Sep	Oct	Nov	Dec	Year
Mean daily maximum °C (°F)	16.8 (62.2)	16.4 (61.5)	16.4 (61.5)	17.5 (63.5)	17.8 (64.0)	17.9 (64.2)	18.0 (64.4)	18.4 (65.1)	18.6 (65.5)	18.4 (65.1)	18.0 (64.4)	17.6 (63.7)	17.7 (63.8)
Mean daily minimum °C (°F)	6.6 (43.9)	7.1 (44.8)	6.6 (43.9)	5.3 (41.5)	3.5 (38.3)	2.7 (36.9)	2.7 (36.9)	3.4 (38.1)	4.2 (39.6)	4.9 (40.8)	4.9 (40.8)	6.2 (43.2)	4.8 (40.7)
Average precipitation mm (inches)	109.6 (4.31)	105.8 (4.17)	103.9 (4.09)	25.7 (1.01)	3.4 (0.13)	1.0 (0.04)	4.5 (0.18)	3.2 (0.13)	6.2 (0.24)	8.4 (0.33)	8.3 (0.33)	34.8 (1.37)	414.8 (16.33)
Source: National Meteorology and Hydrology Service of Peru
