= Silla Q'asa (Peru) =

Mountain in Peru

- Location within Peru

Highest point
- Elevation: 4,600 m (15,100 ft)
- Coordinates: 14°23′54″S 73°37′39″W

Geography
- Location: Peru, Ayacucho Region
- Parent range: Andes

Silla Q'asa (Quechua silla gravel, q'asa mountain pass, "gravel pass", also spelled Sillajasa) is a mountain in the Andes of Peru, about 4,600 m (15,092 ft) high. It is located in the Ayacucho Region, Lucanas Province, Chipao District. Silla Q'asa lies between Uqi in the west and Puka Punchu in the east and southeast, northeast of a lake named Upaqucha.
