= Ocaña District =

Coordinates: 14.3983°S 74.8231°W

Ocaña
- District
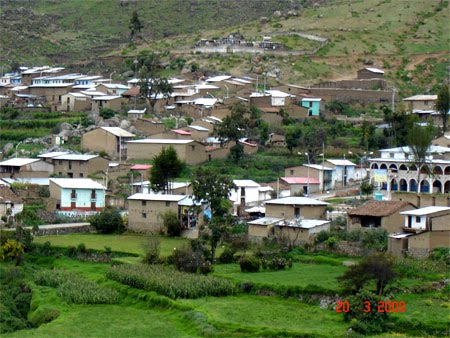
- Interactive map of Ocaña
- Country: Peru
- Region: Ayacucho
- Province: Lucanas
- Founded: April 7, 1929
- Capital: Ocaña

Government
  - Mayor: Celino Pardo Champi

Area
  - Total: 848.36 km^{2} (327.55 sq mi)
- Elevation: 2,660 m (8,730 ft)

Population (2005 census)
  - Total: 3,685
  - Density: 4.344/km^{2} (11.25/sq mi)
- Time zone: UTC-5 (PET)
- UBIGEO: 050612

Ocaña District is one of twenty-one districts of the province Lucanas in Peru.
