= Lake Ancascocha =

Ancascocha Dam
- Location within Peru
- Country: Peru; Ayacucho Region
- Coordinates: 14°55′20″S 73°50′20″W

Dam and spillways
- Height: 13 m (43 ft)

Reservoir
- Creates: Lake Ancascocha
- Total capacity: 15,000,000 m^{3} (12,000 acre⋅ft)
- Maximum length: 2.24 km (1.39 mi)
- Maximum width: 1.48 km (0.92 mi)
- Normal elevation: 3,424 m (11,234 ft)

Lake Ancascocha (possibly from Quechua anqas blue, qucha lake) is a lake in Peru located in the Ayacucho Region, Lucanas Province, Chaviña District, and in the Parinacochas Province, Coracora District. It is situated at a height of approximately 3,424 metres (11,234 ft), about 2.24 km long and 1.48 km at its widest point.

The Ancascocha Dam was erected at the southern end of the lake. It is 13 m (43 ft) high. The reservoir has a capacity of 15,000,000 m^{3} (12,000 acre⋅ft).

== See also ==
- List of lakes in Peru
