= Huamatambo District =

Coordinates: 13.0946°S 75.6773°W

Huamatambo Wamatampu
- District
- Interactive map of Huamatambo
- Country: Peru
- Region: Huancavelica
- Province: Castrovirreyna
- Founded: January 12, 1942
- Capital: Huamatambo

Area
  - Total: 54.16 km^{2} (20.91 sq mi)
- Elevation: 3,056 m (10,026 ft)

Population (2005 census)
  - Total: 457
  - Density: 8.44/km^{2} (21.9/sq mi)
- Time zone: UTC-5 (PET)
- UBIGEO: 090408

Huamatambo District is one of thirteen districts of the province Castrovirreyna in Peru.
