= Santa Lucía District, Lucanas =

Coordinates: 14°41′38″S 74°07′27″W

Santa Lucía District
- District
- Interactive map of Santa Lucía District
- Country: Peru
- Region: Ayacucho
- Province: Lucanas
- Capital: Santa Lucía

Government
  - Mayor: Godofredo Roger Barrientos Guevara

Area
  - Total: 1,019.14 km^{2} (393.49 sq mi)
- Elevation: 2,343 m (7,687 ft)

Population (2005 census)
  - Total: 1,321
  - Density: 1.296/km^{2} (3.357/sq mi)
- Time zone: UTC-5 (PET)
- UBIGEO: 050621

Santa Lucía District is one of twenty-one districts of the province Lucanas in Peru.
