= Huachos District =

Coordinates: 13.2199°S 75.5336°W

Huachos
- District
- Interactive map of Huachos
- Country: Peru
- Region: Huancavelica
- Province: Castrovirreyna
- Capital: Huachos

Government
  - Mayor: Sra. René Díaz Villavicencio (Movimiento Independiente Trabajando para Todos)

Area
  - Total: 172.01 km^{2} (66.41 sq mi)
- Elevation: 2,737 m (8,980 ft)

Population (2005 census)
  - Total: 1,485
  - Density: 8.633/km^{2} (22.36/sq mi)
- Demonym(s): Huachino (male); Huachina (female)
- Time zone: UTC-5 (PET)
- UBIGEO: 090407

Huachos District is one of thirteen districts of the province Castrovirreyna in Peru.

== Climate ==
Climate data for Huachos, elevation 2,736 m (8,976 ft), (1991–2020)
Month	Jan	Feb	Mar	Apr	May	Jun	Jul	Aug	Sep	Oct	Nov	Dec	Year
Mean daily maximum °C (°F)	20.9 (69.6)	19.7 (67.5)	19.5 (67.1)	21.0 (69.8)	21.7 (71.1)	21.3 (70.3)	21.4 (70.5)	22.1 (71.8)	22.7 (72.9)	22.8 (73.0)	22.5 (72.5)	21.3 (70.3)	21.4 (70.5)
Mean daily minimum °C (°F)	9.6 (49.3)	10.0 (50.0)	9.9 (49.8)	9.4 (48.9)	8.6 (47.5)	8.5 (47.3)	8.2 (46.8)	8.7 (47.7)	9.3 (48.7)	9.3 (48.7)	9.0 (48.2)	9.5 (49.1)	9.2 (48.5)
Average precipitation mm (inches)	108.7 (4.28)	123.3 (4.85)	139.7 (5.50)	36.2 (1.43)	2.1 (0.08)	0.4 (0.02)	0.0 (0.0)	0.6 (0.02)	2.2 (0.09)	7.4 (0.29)	11.4 (0.45)	54.6 (2.15)	486.6 (19.16)
Source: National Meteorology and Hydrology Service of Peru
