= Cocas District =

Coordinates: 13.2760°S 75.3725°W

Cocas
- District
- Interactive map of Cocas
- Country: Peru
- Region: Huancavelica
- Province: Castrovirreyna
- Founded: January 18, 1926
- Capital: Cocas

Area
  - Total: 87.95 km^{2} (33.96 sq mi)
- Elevation: 3,246 m (10,650 ft)

Population (2005 census)
  - Total: 923
  - Density: 10.5/km^{2} (27.2/sq mi)
- Time zone: UTC-5 (PET)
- UBIGEO: 090406

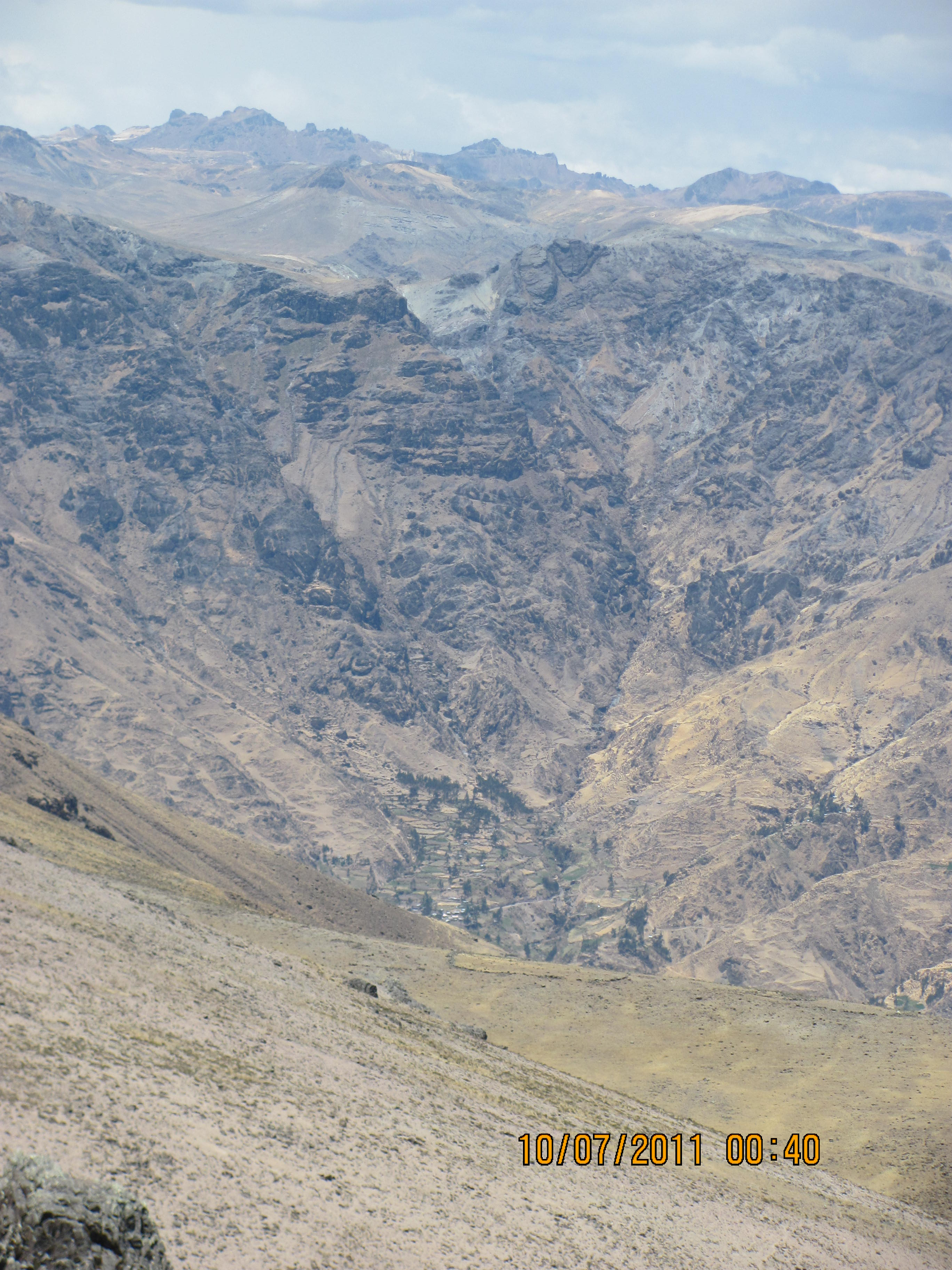
View looking east towards Vichavichay, Cocas District, Castrovirreyna Province (Peru), 2011

Cocas District is one of thirteen districts of the province Castrovirreyna in Peru.
