= Puquio =

Puquio Pukyu
- Town
- Location within Peru
- Coordinates: 14°41′38.21″S 74°07′26.88″W
- Country: Peru
- Region: Ayacucho
- Province: Lucanas
- District: Puquio

Government
  - Mayor: Luis Alfonso Moya Mora
- Elevation: 3,214 m (10,545 ft)

Population
  - Total: 15,870
- Time zone: UTC-5 (PET)

Puquio (from Quechua: Pukyu, meaning "spring of water") is a town in Central Peru, South America. It is the capital of the province Lucanas in the region Ayacucho.

== Climate ==
Climate data for Puquio, elevation 3,176 m (10,420 ft), (1991–2020)
Month	Jan	Feb	Mar	Apr	May	Jun	Jul	Aug	Sep	Oct	Nov	Dec	Year
Mean daily maximum °C (°F)	16.8 (62.2)	16.4 (61.5)	16.4 (61.5)	17.5 (63.5)	17.8 (64.0)	17.9 (64.2)	18.0 (64.4)	18.4 (65.1)	18.6 (65.5)	18.4 (65.1)	18.0 (64.4)	17.6 (63.7)	17.7 (63.8)
Mean daily minimum °C (°F)	6.6 (43.9)	7.1 (44.8)	6.6 (43.9)	5.3 (41.5)	3.5 (38.3)	2.7 (36.9)	2.7 (36.9)	3.4 (38.1)	4.2 (39.6)	4.9 (40.8)	4.9 (40.8)	6.2 (43.2)	4.8 (40.7)
Average precipitation mm (inches)	109.6 (4.31)	105.8 (4.17)	103.9 (4.09)	25.7 (1.01)	3.4 (0.13)	1.0 (0.04)	4.5 (0.18)	3.2 (0.13)	6.2 (0.24)	8.4 (0.33)	8.3 (0.33)	34.8 (1.37)	414.8 (16.33)
Source: National Meteorology and Hydrology Service of Peru
