= Otoca District =

Coordinates: 14°41′38″S 74°07′27″W

Otoca
- District
- Interactive map of Otoca
- Country: Peru
- Region: Ayacucho
- Province: Lucanas
- Capital: Otoca

Government
  - Mayor: Julio Americo Martinez Cabezudo

Area
  - Total: 720.2 km^{2} (278.1 sq mi)
- Elevation: 1,800 m (5,900 ft)

Population (2005 census)
  - Total: 2,461
  - Density: 3.417/km^{2} (8.850/sq mi)
- Time zone: UTC-5 (PET)
- UBIGEO: 050613

Otoca District is one of twenty-one districts of the Lucanas Province in Peru.

== Geography ==
One of the highest mountains of the district is Yana Qaqa at approximately 4,200 m (13,800 ft). Other mountains are listed below:

- Apachita
- Aqu P'ukru
- Aqu Urqu
- Ch'illka
- Hatun Kinwa
- Ichhu P'ukru
- Illachayuq
- Kuntur Sinqa
- Kunturillu
- Minaschayuq
- Ñawpallaqta
- Pata Wasi
- Pichqa Puyku
- Pilluni
- Puka Muqu
- Puka Qaqa
- Puka Q'asa
- Pukara
- Phiruruyuq
- Rumi Pukyu
- Qucha P'ukru
- Qhawana Muqu
- Q'illu Q'asa
- Sach'a Urqu
- Salla Punta
- Silla Q'asa
- Titinka
- Wawsiyuq
- Willani
- Yana Ranra
- Yana Urqu
- Yuraq Q'asa
- Yuraq Rumi
