= Jayuni =

Mountain in Peru

- Location within Peru

Highest point
- Elevation: 4,600 m (15,100 ft)
- Coordinates: 14°20′23″S 73°42′39″W

Geography
- Location: Peru, Ayacucho Region, Lucanas Province, Sucre Province
- Parent range: Andes

Jayuni (Aymara jayu salt, -ni a suffix to indicate ownership, "the one with salt", also spelled Jayune) is a mountain in the Andes of Peru, about 4,600 m (15,092 ft) high. It is located in the Ayacucho Region, Lucanas Province, in the north of the Chipao District. Jayuni lies northwest of Qarwarasu and Sallqan Tiwa.
