= Kanichi, Peru =

Archaeological site in Peru

Kanichi
- Interactive map of Kanichi
- 14°23′03″S 73°57′26″W
- Location: Peru, Ayacucho Region, Lucanas Province
- Region: Andes

Kanichi (from Ayacucho Quechua, Hispanicized spelling Caniche) is an archaeological site in Peru. It was declared a National Cultural Heritage by RDN No. 197/INC on April 2, 2003. Kanichi lies in the Ayacucho Region, Lucanas Province, Carmen Salcedo District.

The archaeological complex, which is about 200,000 square meters, was influenced by the Wari and Chanka cultures. The complex includes a variety of buildings including Chullpas, religious and ceremonial buildings, service centers, and a water system of wells and springs.

Kanichi is open to tourists from 6am to 6pm.
