= Chipao District =

Coordinates: 14.2502°S 73.9545°W

Chipao Chipaw
- District
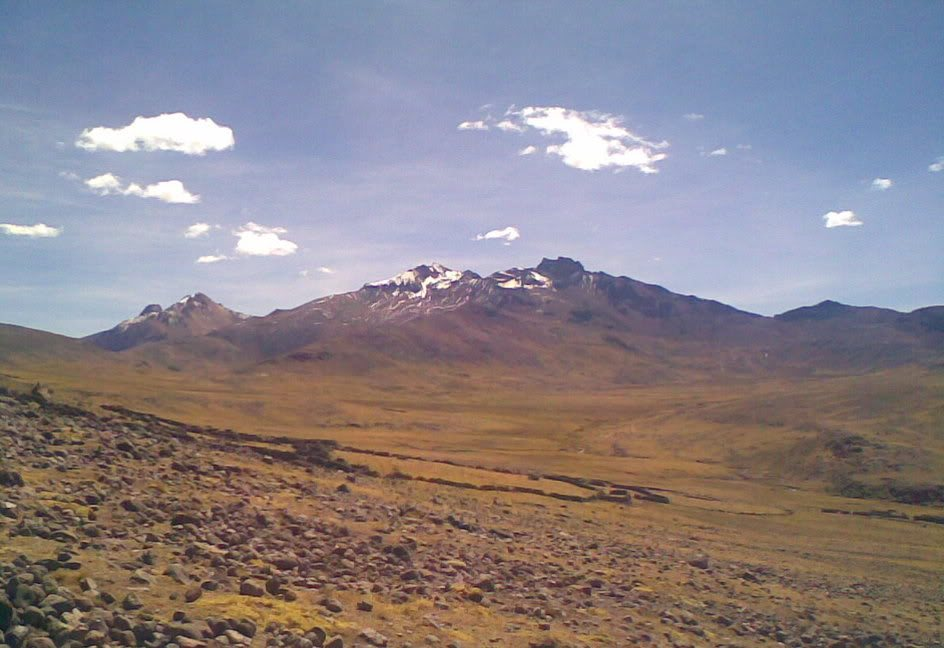
- Qarwarasu
- Interactive map of Chipao
- Country: Peru
- Region: Ayacucho
- Province: Lucanas
- Capital: Chipao

Government
  - Mayor: William Sandro Espino Ferrel

Area
  - Total: 1,166.91 km^{2} (450.55 sq mi)
- Elevation: 3,420 m (11,220 ft)

Population (2005 census)
  - Total: 3,580
  - Density: 3.07/km^{2} (7.95/sq mi)
- Time zone: UTC-5 (PET)
- UBIGEO: 050606

Chipao District is one of twenty-one districts of the province Lucanas in Peru.

== Geography Not Historical ==
Some of the highest mountains in the district are Rasuwillka and Qarwarasu. Other mountains are listed below:

- Anta P'ukru
- Anta Urqu
- Aqu P'ukru
- Aqu Urqu
- Chakra Pata
- Chunta
- Ichhu Qutu
- Jayuni
- Misk'i Pata
- Palla Palla
- Parqa Parqa
- Pawkaray
- Pichqaqucha
- Puka Muqu
- Puka Punchu
- Puka Salla
- Phiruru
- Qarwa Uqhu
- Qullpa Punta
- Q'illu Q'asa
- Q'illu Urqu
- Sallqan Tiwa
- Sapan Urqu
- Silla Q'asa
- Surapata
- Titi Q'asa
- Uqi
- Waman Pirqa
- Waych'ayuq
- Waylla Wit'u
- Waytayuq
- Yana Ranra
- Yana Yana
- Yunka
- Yuraq Pata

== Ethnic groups ==
The people in the district are mainly indigenous citizens of Quechua descent. Quechua is the language which the majority of the population (73.03%) learnt to speak in childhood, 26.54% of the residents started speaking using the Spanish language (per the 2007 Peru Census).

== See also ==
- Apiñaqucha
- Aya Muqu
- Chawpiqucha
- Chipaw Marka
- Islaqucha
- Sawaqucha
- Suyt'uqucha
- Urqunqucha
- Wat'aqucha
