= Lake Chaupijocha (Ayacucho) =

Lake in Ayacucho, Peru

- Location within Peru
- Location: Peru; Ayacucho Region
- Coordinates: 14°29′49″S 73°37′20″W

Lake Chaupijocha (possibly from Quechua chawpi middle, central, qucha lake) is a lake in the Ayacucho Region in Peru. It is located in the Lucanas Province, Chipao District. Lake Chaupijocha lies northwest of Wat'aqucha and east of Suyt'uqucha.
