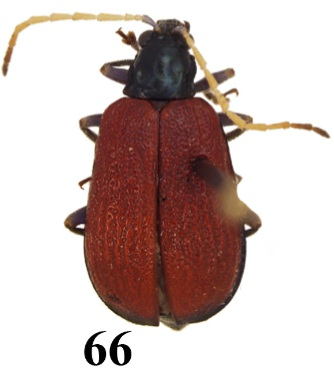

Scientific classification
- Kingdom: Animalia
- Phylum: Arthropoda
- Clade: Pancrustacea
- Class: Insecta
- Order: Coleoptera
- Suborder: Polyphaga
- Infraorder: Cucujiformia
- Family: Chrysomelidae
- Genus: Cochabamba
- Species: C. chrysopleura

Binomial name
- Cochabamba chrysopleura (Harold, 1875)

Synonyms
- Diabrotica chrysopleura Harold, 1875

= Cochabamba chrysopleura =

Species of beetle

Cochabamba chrysopleura is a species of beetle of the family Chrysomelidae. It is found in Peru.
