= Chipaw Marka =

Archaeological site in Peru

- Interactive map of Chipaw Marka
- Location: Peru, Ayacucho Region, Lucanas Province
- Region: Andes

Chipaw Marka (Hispanicized spelling Chipaomarca) is an archaeological site in Peru. It was declared a National Cultural Heritage in 2003. Chipaw Marka lies in the Ayacucho Region, Lucanas Province, Chipao District.
