= Cabana District, Lucanas =

Coordinates: 14°41′38″S 74°07′27″W

Cabana Qhawana
- District
- Interactive map of Cabana
- Country: Peru
- Region: Ayacucho
- Province: Lucanas
- Capital: Cabana

Government
  - Mayor: Guzmán Chava Cupe

Area
  - Total: 402.62 km^{2} (155.45 sq mi)
- Elevation: 3,282 m (10,768 ft)

Population (2017)
  - Total: 2,189
  - Density: 5.437/km^{2} (14.08/sq mi)
- Time zone: UTC-5 (PET)
- UBIGEO: 050603

Cabana District is one of twenty-one districts of the province Lucanas in Peru.

== Geography ==
Some of the highest mountains of the district are listed below:

- Anqasi
- Inka Wasi
- Kimsa Saywa
- Kuntur Sinqa
- Kunturillu
- Maranniyuq
- Misapata (Cabana)
- Misapata (Cab.-Luc.)
- Misa Q'asa
- Misa Urqu
- Puka Salla
- Phiruruchayuq
- Saywa
- Wamanrasu
- Yana Qaqa

== Ethnic groups ==
The people in the district are mainly indigenous citizens of Quechua descent. Quechua is the language which the majority of the population (57.13%) learnt to speak in childhood, 42.61% of the residents started speaking using the Spanish language (2007 Peru Census).

== See also ==
- Parqaqucha
- Usqunta
