= T'urpuqucha =

Lake in Ayacucho, Peru

- Location within Peru
- Location: Peru; Ayacucho Region
- Coordinates: 14°15′10″S 74°13′46″W

T'urpuqucha (Quechua t'urpu pointed, sharp, qucha lake, hispanicized spelling Turpoccocha) is a lake in Peru. It is located in the Ayacucho Region, Lucanas Province, Aucara District. T'urpuqucha lies in the Pampa Galeras – Barbara D'Achille National Reserve.
