= Misapata (Cabana) =

Mountain in Peru

- Location within Peru

Highest point
- Elevation: 4,400 m (14,400 ft)
- Coordinates: 14°24′49″S 74°10′14″W

Geography
- Location: Peru, Ayacucho Region, Lucanas Province
- Parent range: Andes

Misapata (Quechua misa table, pata elevated place; above, at the top; edge, bank, shore, also spelled Mesapata) is a mountain in the Andes of Peru, about 4,400 metres (14,436 ft) high. It is situated in the Ayacucho Region, Lucanas Province, Cabana District. It lies northwest of Anqasi and east of Saywa (Saygua).
