= Aya Muqu =

Archaeological site in Peru

- Interactive map of Aya Muqu
- 14.250083°S 73.957556°W
- Location: Peru, Ayacucho Region, Lucanas Province
- Region: Andes

Aya Muqu (Quechua aya corpse, muqu hill, "corpse hill", also spelled Aya Moqo) is an archaeological site in Peru. It was declared a National Cultural Heritage by Resolución Directoral in 2003. Aya Muqu is in the Ayacucho Region, Lucanas Province, Chipao District.
