= Carmen Salcedo District =

Coordinates: 14°41′38″S 74°07′27″W

Carmen Salcedo Antamarka
- District
- Interactive map of Carmen Salcedo
- Country: Peru
- Region: Ayacucho
- Province: Lucanas
- Founded: December 28, 1943
- Capital: Andamarca

Government
  - Mayor: Hugo Calixto Quispe Delgado

Area
  - Total: 473.66 km^{2} (182.88 sq mi)
- Elevation: 3,437 m (11,276 ft)

Population (2005 census)
  - Total: 1,768
  - Density: 3.733/km^{2} (9.667/sq mi)
- Time zone: UTC-5 (PET)
- UBIGEO: 050604

Carmen Salcedo District is one of twenty-one districts of the Lucanas Province in Peru.

== Geography ==
One of the highest mountains of the district is Waytayuq at approximately 4,800 m (15,700 ft). Other mountains are listed below:

- Ichhu Urqu Pata
- Inka Pallanka
- Inka Phaqcha
- Kunturillu
- Llallawa
- Pichqaqucha
- P'isqu Pukyu
- Ruru Rumi
- Qullpa Punta
- Q'illu
- Ruphasqa
- Uqi Uqi
- Waman Pirqa
- Wamanripa
- Waytayuq
- Wiksu
- Yana Uma
- Yuraq Rumi
- Yuraq Urqu

== Ethnic groups ==
The people in the district are mainly indigenous citizens of Quechua descent. Quechua is the language which the majority of the population (56.46%) learnt to speak in childhood, 43.24% of the residents started speaking using the Spanish language (2007 Peru Census).

== See also ==
- Kanichi
- Nina Kiru
- Quriwayrachina
- Waman Pirqa
