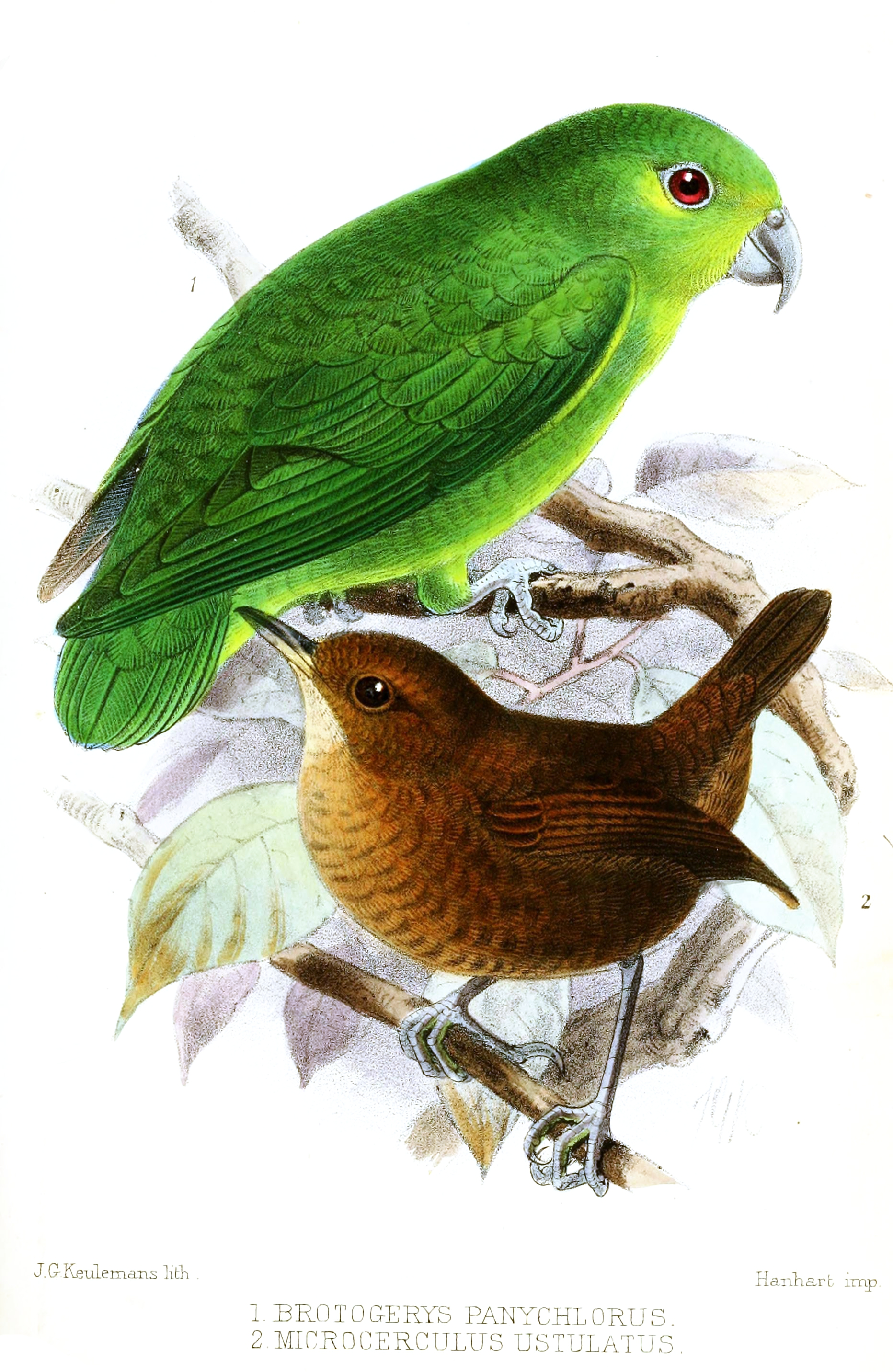
- A tepui parrotlet (above) with a flutist wren

Scientific classification
- Kingdom: Animalia
- Phylum: Chordata
- Class: Aves
- Order: Psittaciformes
- Family: Psittacidae
- Subfamily: Arinae
- Genus: Nannopsittaca; Ridgway, 1912

Type species
- Brotogerys panychlorus Solvin & Godman, 1883

Species
- see text

= Nannopsittaca =

Genus of birds

Nannopsittaca is a genus of parrot in the family Psittacidae.

== Species ==
It contains the following species:

Image	Common name	Scientific name	Distribution
	Tepui parrotlet	Nannopsittaca panychlora	northern Brazil, western Guyana, and southern Venezuela.
	Manu parrotlet	Nannopsittaca dachilleae	western Amazon basin, from southern Peru to northwest Bolivia.
