= Chaviña District =

Coordinates: 14°41′38″S 74°07′27″W

Chaviña Chawiña
- District
- Interactive map of Chaviña
- Country: Peru
- Region: Ayacucho
- Province: Lucanas
- Founded: August 22, 1921
- Capital: Chaviña

Government
  - Mayor: Ysrael Alcides Atoccza Torres

Area
  - Total: 399.09 km^{2} (154.09 sq mi)
- Elevation: 3,310 m (10,860 ft)

Population (2005 census)
  - Total: 2,708
  - Density: 6.785/km^{2} (17.57/sq mi)
- Time zone: UTC-5 (PET)
- UBIGEO: 050605

Chaviña District is one of twenty-one districts of the province Lucanas in Peru.

== Ethnic groups ==
The people in the district are mainly indigenous citizens of Quechua descent. Quechua is the language which the majority of the population (60.77%) learnt to speak in childhood, 39.01% of the residents started speaking using the Spanish language (2007 Peru Census).

== See also ==
- Anqasqucha
