= Pukaqucha (Ayacucho) =

Lake in Peru

- Location within Peru
- Location: Peru; Ayacucho Region
- Coordinates: 14°41′S 73°52′W
- Surface elevation: 4,406 m (14,455 ft)

Pukaqucha (Quechua puca red, qucha lake, "red lake", Hispanicized spelling Pucaccocha) is a lake in Peru located in the Ayacucho Region, Lucanas Province, Puquio District. It is situated at a height of about 4,406 metres (14,455 ft). Pukaqucha lies southeast of the lakes named Yawriwiri, Urqunqucha, Sawaqucha and Apiñaqucha, south of Islaqucha and west of Tipiqucha.

== See also ==
- List of lakes in Peru
