= Bárbara D'Achille =

Latvian ecological journalist

Bárbara D'Achille (1941–1989) was a Latvian-Peruvian journalist and conservationist. She was born in Latvia but spent most of her adult life in Western Europe and South America. She wrote for El Comercio, where she managed a regular ecology section. Brown describes her as Peru's foremost environmental journalist. She also consulted for the World Wildlife Fund and other international NGOs.

In 1989 she was killed by members of Shining Path while traveling in Huancavelica. She was 48. A colleague, Esteban Bohorquez, was also killed.

D'Achille had a daughter, Daina. Pampa Galeras – Barbara D'Achille National Reserve is named after D'Achille, as is the Manu parrotlet (Nannopsittaca dachilleae). D'Achille's murder is discussed in the final report of the Peruvian Truth and Reconciliation Commission. A character resembling D'Achille appears in Mario Vargas Llosa's novel Death in the Andes.
