= Lucanas District =

Coordinates: 14°41′38″S 74°07′27″W

Lucanas
- District
- Interactive map of Lucanas
- Country: Peru
- Region: Ayacucho
- Province: Lucanas
- Capital: Lucanas

Government
  - Mayor: Anibal Poma Sarmiento

Area
  - Total: 1,205.78 km^{2} (465.55 sq mi)
- Elevation: 3,375 m (11,073 ft)

Population (2005 census)
  - Total: 3,189
  - Density: 2.645/km^{2} (6.850/sq mi)
- Time zone: UTC-5 (PET)
- UBIGEO: 050611

Lucanas District is one of twenty-one districts of the Lucanas Province in Peru.

== Geography ==
One of the highest mountains of the district is Usqunta at approximately 4,400 m (14,400 ft) with an archaeological site of that name. Other mountains are listed below:

- Allwisqa
- Anta Urqu
- Chakasqa
- Chawpi Pata
- Chuqi Phaqcha
- Ch'illwa
- Kunkachayuq
- Kunturillu
- Llama Wasi
- Misapata
- Misk'i Pukyu
- Puka Salla
- Punta Urqu
- Phiruru
- Phiruruyuq
- P'iti Qalla
- Qillwa Q'asa
- Qiñwa Q'asa
- Q'illu
- Saywa
- Suyt'u Urqu
- Waman Rasu
- Wamaniyuq
- Waqramarka
- Yana Allpa

== Ethnic groups ==
The people in the district are mainly indigenous citizens of Quechua descent. Quechua is the language which the majority of the population (57.23%) learnt to speak in childhood, 42.23% of the residents started speaking using the Spanish language (2007 Peru Census).
