= Aucara District =

Coordinates: 14°41′38″S 74°07′27″W

Aucará
- District
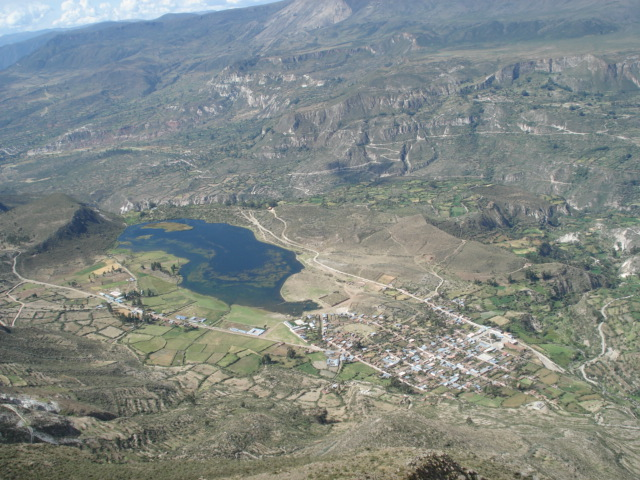
- The lake Qochapampa and the village of Aucará
- Interactive map of Aucará
- Country: Peru
- Region: Ayacucho
- Province: Lucanas
- Capital: Aucará

Government
  - Mayor: Porfirio Quispe Urbano

Area
  - Total: 903.51 km^{2} (348.85 sq mi)
- Elevation: 3,220 m (10,560 ft)

Population (2005 census)
  - Total: 2,744
  - Density: 3.037/km^{2} (7.866/sq mi)
- Time zone: UTC-5 (PET)
- UBIGEO: 050602

Aucará District is one of twenty-one districts of the Lucanas Province in Peru.

== Geography ==
One of the highest mountains of the district is Kunturillu at approximately 4,600 m (15,100 ft). Other mountains are listed below:

- Aqu Q'asa
- Aya Qullqa
- Hatun Sayri
- Illa Q'asa
- Inka Phaqcha
- Kiru Chuku
- Llama Wasi
- Machu P'unqu
- Minaschayuq
- Misa Q'asa
- Misa Urqu
- Muqu Wasi
- Muyu Muyu
- Pata Wasi
- Puka Phiruru
- Puka Qullpa
- Puma Ranra
- Puywan
- Phiruruyuq
- Qillqay Saywa
- Qurip Sunqun
- Quriwayrachina
- Q'illu Sura
- Ranra Urqu
- Sayaq Mach'ay
- Saywa
- Saywa Pata
- Sura Q'asa
- Ranra Urqu
- Ukru Kancha
- Waña Pampa
- Waqutu
- Waraqu
- Yana Qaqa
- Yana Urqu

== Ethnic groups ==
The people in the district are mainly indigenous citizens of Quechua descent. Quechua is the language which the majority of the population (52.65%) learnt to speak in childhood, 47.04% of the residents started speaking using the Spanish language (2007 Peru Census).

== See also ==
- Hatun Misapata
- Quchapampa
- Q'asa Pata
- T'urpuqucha
- Usqunta
