= Santa Ana de Huaycahuacho District =

Coordinates: 14°41′38″S 74°07′27″W

Santa Ana de Huaycahuacho
- District
- Interactive map of Santa Ana de Huaycahuacho
- Country: Peru
- Region: Ayacucho
- Province: Lucanas
- Founded: May 21, 1962
- Capital: Santa Ana de Huaycahuacho

Government
  - Mayor: Maximiliana Sotelo Luque

Area
  - Total: 50.63 km^{2} (19.55 sq mi)
- Elevation: 2,967 m (9,734 ft)

Population (2005 census)
  - Total: 739
  - Density: 14.6/km^{2} (37.8/sq mi)
- Time zone: UTC-5 (PET)
- UBIGEO: 050620

Santa Ana de Huaycahuacho District is one of twenty-one districts of the province Lucanas in Peru.

== Ethnic groups ==
The people in the district are mainly indigenous citizens of Quechua descent. Quechua is the language which the majority of the population (76.82%) learnt to speak in childhood, 23.04% of the residents started speaking using the Spanish language (2007 Peru Census).
