= Wat'aqucha (Ayacucho) =

Lake in Peru

- Location within Peru
- Location: Peru; Ayacucho Region
- Coordinates: 14°30′08″S 73°36′18″W

Wat'aqucha (Quechua wat'a island, qucha lake, "island lake", Hispanicized spelling Huatajocha) is a lake in the Ayacucho Region in Peru. It is located in the Lucanas Province, Chipao District. Wat'aqucha lies southeast of Suyt'uqucha and Chawpiqucha.
