= Sancos District, Lucanas =

Coordinates: 15.0621°S 73.9517°W

Sancos District
- District
- Interactive map of Sancos District
- Country: Peru
- Region: Ayacucho
- Province: Lucanas
- Capital: Sancos

Government
  - Mayor: Pedro Fidel Quispe Marquez

Area
  - Total: 1,520.87 km^{2} (587.21 sq mi)
- Elevation: 2,817 m (9,242 ft)

Population (2005 census)
  - Total: 4,574
  - Density: 3.007/km^{2} (7.789/sq mi)
- Time zone: UTC-5 (PET)
- UBIGEO: 050619

Sancos District is one of the twenty-one districts of the province of Lucanas, in Peru.
