= Huac-Huas District =

Coordinates: 14°41′38″S 74°07′27″W

Huac-Huas Waqwa
- District
- Interactive map of Huac-Huas
- Country: Peru
- Region: Ayacucho
- Province: Lucanas
- Founded: April 8, 1929
- Capital: Huac-Huas

Government
  - Mayor: Emilio Rito Palomino Alfaro

Area
  - Total: 309.48 km^{2} (119.49 sq mi)
- Elevation: 3,170 m (10,400 ft)

Population (2005 census)
  - Total: 2,637
  - Density: 8.521/km^{2} (22.07/sq mi)
- Time zone: UTC-5 (PET)
- UBIGEO: 050607

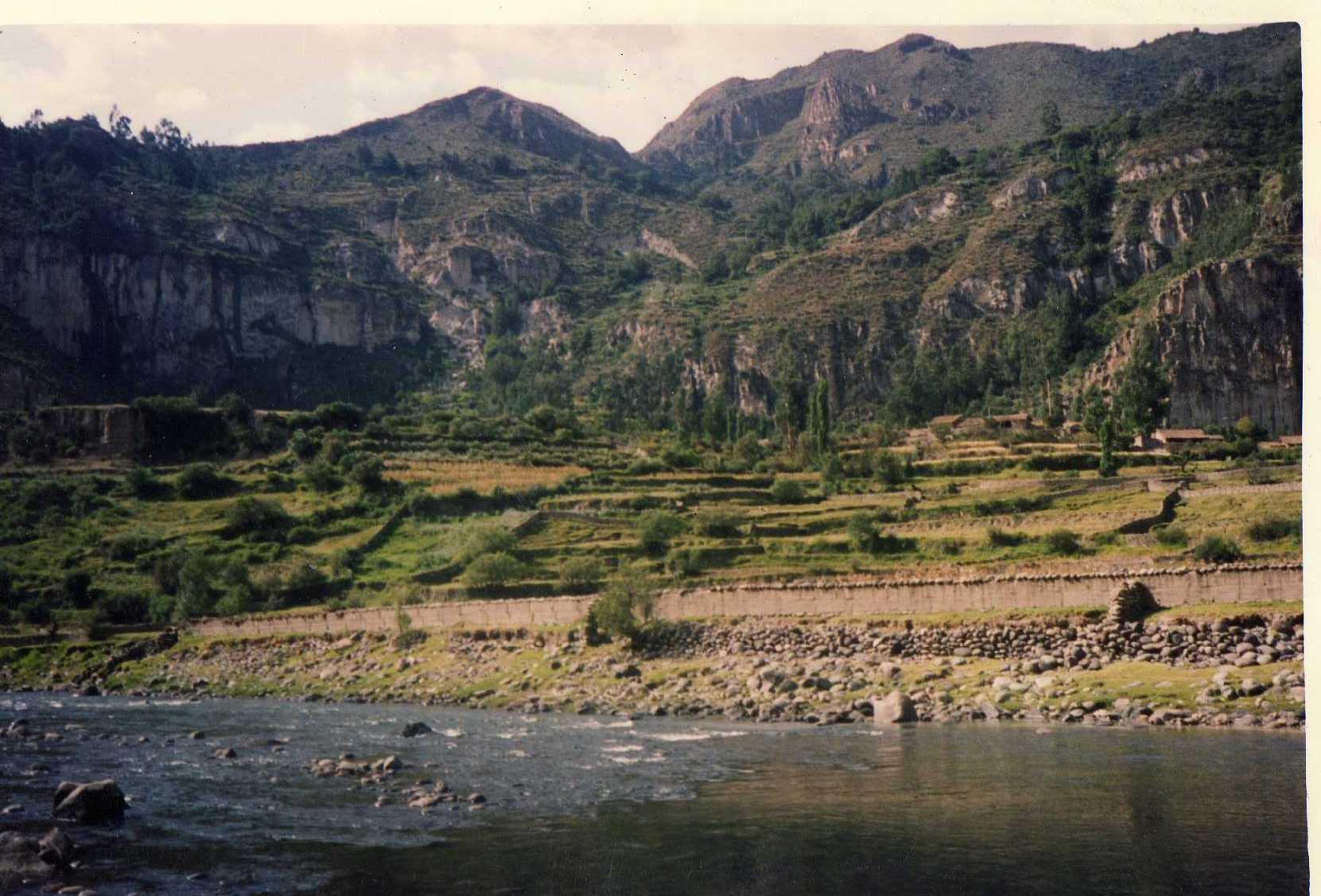

Huac-Huas District is one of twenty-one districts of the province Lucanas in Peru.
