= Ñawpallaqta, Lucanas =

Archaeological site in Peru

Ñawpallaqta
- Interactive map of Ñawpallaqta
- 14°43′40″S 74°12′05″W
- Location: Peru, Ayacucho Region, Lucanas Province
- Region: Andes

Ñawpallaqta or Ñawpa Llaqta (Quechua ñawpa ancient, llaqta place (village, town, city, country, nation), "ancient place", also spelled Ñaupallacta, Ñaupallaqta) is an archaeological site in Peru on top of a mountain of that name. It lies in the Ayacucho Region, Lucanas Province, San Cristóbal District. It is situated near the archaeological site of Puka Urqu, southeast of it.
