= Lake Orconcocha (Ayacucho) =

Lake in Peru

- Location within Peru Location within South America
- Interactive map of Lake Orconcocha
- Location: Peru; Ayacucho Region
- Coordinates: 14°36′0.6″S 73°56′10″W
- Surface elevation: 4,402 m (14,442 ft)

Lake Orconcocha (possibly from Quechua urqu male / mountain, -n a suffix, qucha lake) is a lake in Peru located in the Ayacucho Region, Lucanas Province, in the districts Chipao and Puquio. It is situated at a height of about 4,402 metres (14,442 ft). Lake Orconcocha lies southwest of Lake Sawaqucha, northwest of lakes Islaqucha, Pukaqucha and Apiñaqucha and northeast of Lake Yawriwiri.

== See also ==
- List of lakes in Peru
