= San Pedro District, Lucanas =

Coordinates: 14°41′38″S 74°07′27″W

San Pedro
- District
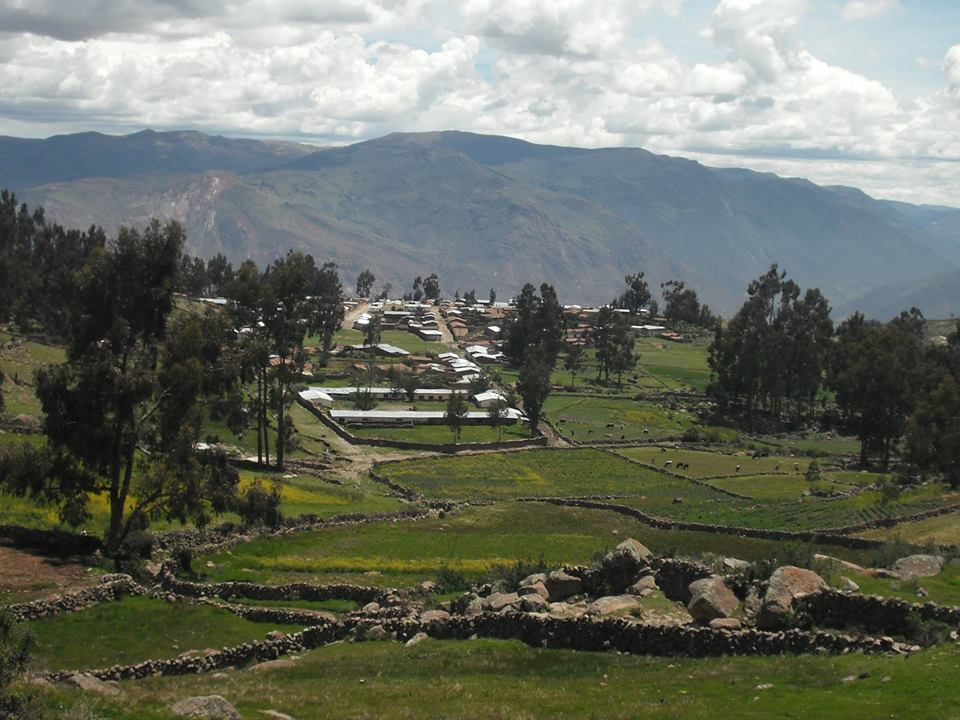
- The village of San Antonio, San Pedro District
- Interactive map of San Pedro
- Country: Peru
- Region: Ayacucho
- Province: Lucanas
- Founded: December 16, 1907
- Capital: San Pedro

Government
  - Mayor: Mariano Taipe Huamani

Area
  - Total: 733.03 km^{2} (283.02 sq mi)
- Elevation: 3,097 m (10,161 ft)

Population (2005 census)
  - Total: 3,268
  - Density: 4.458/km^{2} (11.55/sq mi)
- Time zone: UTC-5 (PET)
- UBIGEO: 050617

San Pedro District is one of twenty-one districts of the province of Lucanas in Peru.

== Ethnic groups ==
The people in the district are mainly indigenous citizens of Quechua descent. Quechua is the language which the majority of the population (80.50%) learnt to speak in childhood, 19.02% of the residents started speaking using the Spanish language (2007 Peru Census).
