= San Pedro de Palco District =

Coordinates: 14°41′38″S 74°07′27″W

San Pedro de Palco
- District
- Interactive map of San Pedro de Palco
- Country: Peru
- Region: Ayacucho
- Province: Lucanas
- Founded: July 8, 1964
- Capital: San Pedro de Palco

Area
  - Total: 531.55 km^{2} (205.23 sq mi)
- Elevation: 2,702 m (8,865 ft)

Population (2005 census)
  - Total: 1,551
  - Density: 2.918/km^{2} (7.557/sq mi)
- Time zone: UTC-5 (PET)
- UBIGEO: 050618

San Pedro de Palco District is one of twenty-one districts of the Lucanas Province in Peru.

== Geography ==
One of the highest mountains of the district is Anka Pallana at approximately 4,400 m (14,400 ft). Other mountains are listed below:

- Akillani
- Apachita
- Aqu K'uchu
- Aqu Llaqta
- Aqu Sirk'a
- Atuq Wachana
- Chawpi Kancha
- Hatun Pampa
- Hatun Wasi
- Ichhu P'ukru
- Ichhu Urqu
- Mulli P'unqu
- Puka Punchu
- Puma Ranra
- Phaqcha P'unqu
- Qarwa Kancha
- Suntur Wasi
- T'uru Pukyu
- Wamanripa
- Wank'a Saywa
- Wawqiyuq
- Waylla
- Waylla K'uchu
- Wayllani
- Yuraq Qaqa Kancha
- Yuraq Q'asa
