= Nina Kiru =

Archaeological site in Peru

- Location: Peru, Ayacucho Region, Lucanas Province
- Region: Andes

Nina Kiru (Quechua nina fire, kiru tooth, "fire tooth", also spelled Nina Kiro, Ninaquero) is an archaeological site with stone tombs (chullpa) in Peru. It was declared a National Cultural Heritage by RDN No. 496 of May 31, 2002. Nina Kiru lies in the Ayacucho Region, Lucanas Province, Carmen Salcedo District, near Antamarka (Andamarca).
