= Suyt'uqucha (Ayacucho) =

Lake in Peru

- Location within Peru
- Location: Peru; Ayacucho Region
- Coordinates: 14°29′47″S 73°39′20″W

Suyt'uqucha (Quechua suyt'u, sayt'u rectangular, qucha lake, "rectangular lake", hispanicized spelling Suytojocha) is a lake in the Ayacucho Region in Peru. It is located in the Lucanas Province, Chipao District. Suyt'uqucha lies northwest and west of Wat'aqucha and Chawpiqucha.
