= Laramate District =

Coordinates: 14°41′38″S 74°07′27″W

Laramate
- District
- Interactive map of Laramate
- Country: Peru
- Region: Ayacucho
- Province: Lucanas
- Capital: Laramate

Government
  - Mayor: Juan Yihino Moscoso Salcedo

Area
  - Total: 785.89 km^{2} (303.43 sq mi)
- Elevation: 3,060 m (10,040 ft)

Population (2005 census)
  - Total: 2,906
  - Density: 3.698/km^{2} (9.577/sq mi)
- Time zone: UTC-5 (PET)
- UBIGEO: 050608

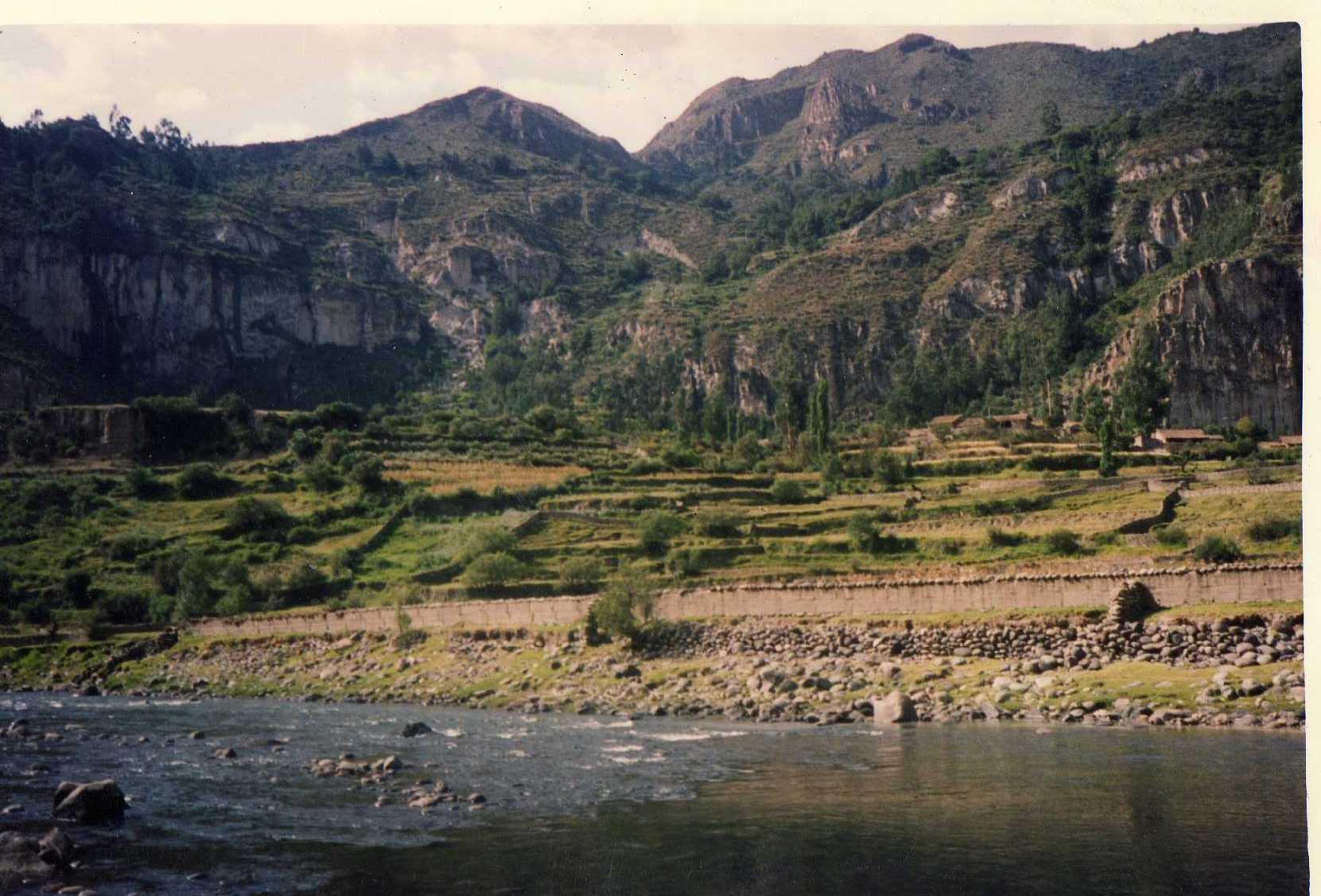
The Sondondo River near Ayacucho.

Laramate District is one of twenty-one districts of the province Lucanas in Peru.

== Geography ==
One of the highest mountains of the district is Yana Ranra at approximately 4,200 m (13,800 ft). Other mountains are listed below:

- Allpa Q'asa
- Artisayuq
- Atuq Urqu
- Chawpi Urqu
- Ichhu Urqu
- Illachayuq
- Illayuq
- Kunturillu
- K'ika Mach'ay
- Llama Rumi
- Llamuqa
- Llaqtapata
- Mulli P'unqu
- Pichqa Pukyu
- Puka Punchu
- Puka Qaqa
- Puka Urqu
- Pukara
- Puyayuq
- Phiruru
- P'isqu Pallana
- Qullpa Wasi
- Q'illu Urqu
- Tinyayuq
- Uqi
- Uqi Muqu
- Wachwalla
- Warawara
- Wayrana Pata
- Wisk'achayuq
- Yana Chata
- Yana Kancha
- Yana Qaqa
- Yana Urqu
- Yuraq Aqu
- Yuraq Kancha
- Yuraq Urqu
