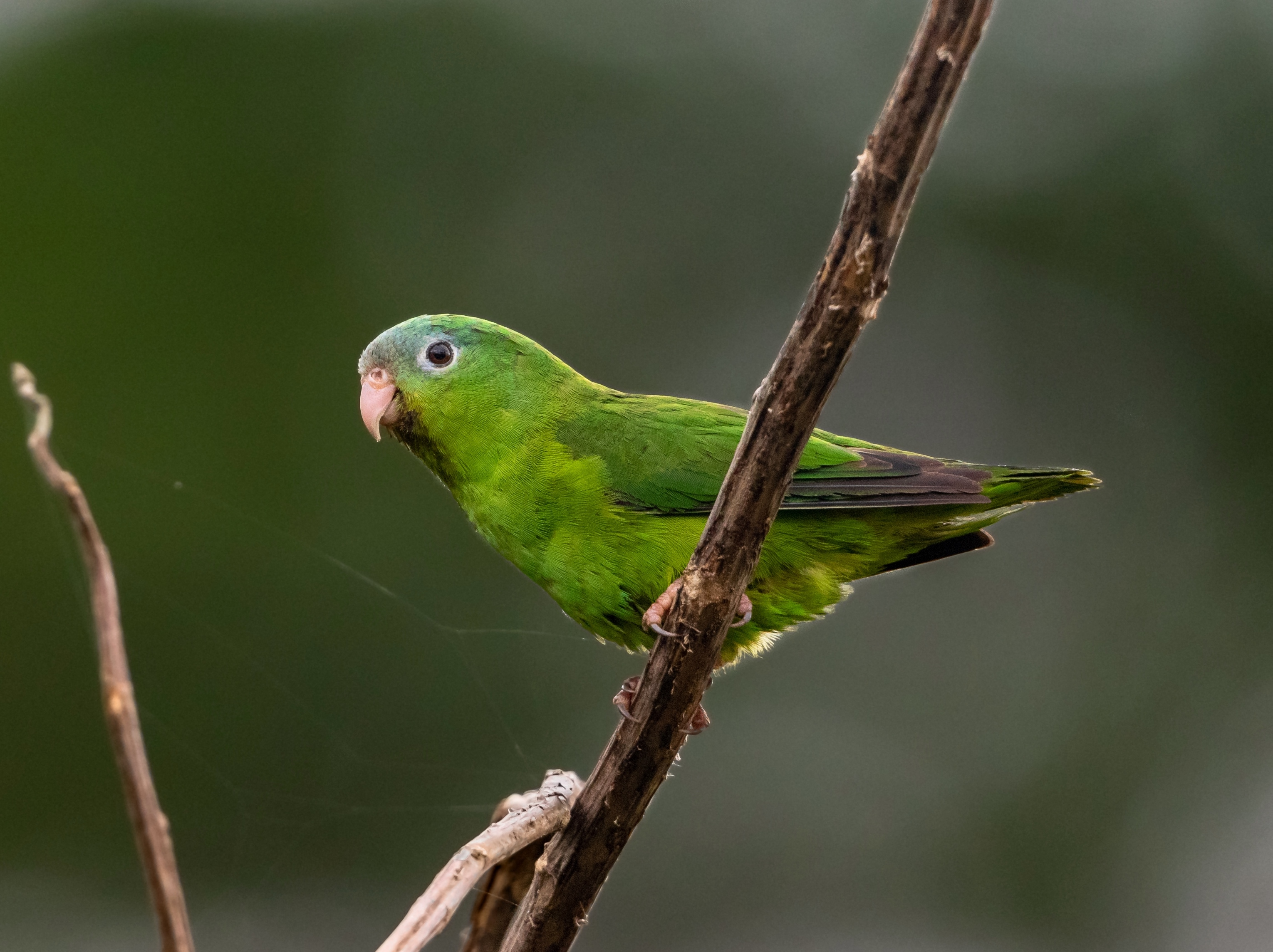

Conservation status
- Least Concern (IUCN 3.1)

Scientific classification
- Kingdom: Animalia
- Phylum: Chordata
- Class: Aves
- Order: Psittaciformes
- Family: Psittacidae
- Genus: Nannopsittaca
- Species: N. dachilleae

Binomial name
- Nannopsittaca dachilleae O'Neill, Munn & Franke, 1991

Synonyms
- Forpus dachilleae

= Manu parrotlet =

Species of bird

The Manu parrotlet (Nannopsittaca dachilleae) or Amazonian parrotlet is a species of parrotlet native to the western Amazon basin, from southern Peru to northwest Bolivia. It is found in lowland forests near bamboo and rivers.

It is classified as Least Concern by the IUCN.

== Taxonomy and naming ==
The Manu parrotlet was discovered in 1985 by John P. O'Neill, Charles A. Munn, and Irma Franke while exploring the Manú River in the Manú National Park in eastern Peru. The new species was named after the scientists' colleague, conservationist and journalist Barbara D'Achille.

The generic name is from Latin nānus dwarf, from Greek nanos dwarf + Latin psittaca feminine of psittacus parrot, from Greek psittakos parrot; dachilleae a Latinized form of the surname d'Achille, hence the "dwarf parrot of d'Achille".

== Description ==
The upper parts, nape, auriculars, dorsum, tertials, wing covers, rump, upper-tail, and rectrices are bright green. The forehead, anterior crown, and ores are a pale blue. The malar area, breast, belly, and under-tail are a paler more yellowish green. No sexual dimorphism has been described as yet.

== Behavior ==
The bird was consistently measured to be in flocks of anywhere from 5 to 12 birds by the researchers who described it. Flocks make sounds similar to squawking or peeping. One possible nest was observed, a burrow among a cluster of bromeliads.

=== Feeding ===
It generally tends to forage on the ground for seeds or in mineral deposits left by rivers, especially on the seeds left behind by bamboo in the genus Guadua.

Another important source of nutrients for the Manu parrotlet is the clay licks, narrow horizons exposed to a vertical bank on a riverbed to consume sodium and other minerals that are depositeted there. The Manu parrotlet appeared every two or three days about midday with groups of dusky-billed parrotlet (Forpus sclateri), tui parakeet (Brotogeris sanctithomae), and cobalt-winged parakeet (B. cyanoptera), with the Manu parrotlet eating clay for about 30 minutes.

== Distribution and habitat ==
The bird has a patchy distribution throughout Brazil, Bolivia, and Peru, with the latter containing the majority of its population. It largely occupies riparian forests, especially those that consist of Calocophyllum spruceanum and Cecropia membranacea.

== Conservation ==
The Manu parrotlet faces primarily habitat fragmentation and degradation from industry, especially mining, and associated roads.
