= Mollepampa District =

Coordinates: 13.3112°S 75.4100°W

Mollepampa
- District
- Interactive map of Mollepampa
- Country: Peru
- Region: Huancavelica
- Province: Castrovirreyna
- Founded: June 20, 1965
- Capital: Mollepampa

Area
  - Total: 165.65 km^{2} (63.96 sq mi)
- Elevation: 2,465 m (8,087 ft)

Population (2005 census)
  - Total: 1,592
  - Density: 9.611/km^{2} (24.89/sq mi)
- Time zone: UTC-5 (PET)
- UBIGEO: 090409

Mollepampa District is one of thirteen districts of the province Castrovirreyna in Peru.
