= Inka Pallanka =

Mountain in Peru

- Location within Peru

Highest point
- Elevation: 4,600 m (15,100 ft)
- Coordinates: 14°31′25″S 74°00′49″W

Geography
- Location: Peru, Ayacucho Region, Lucanas Province
- Parent range: Andes

Inka Pallanka (also spelled Incapallanca, Inkapallanka) is a mountain in the Andes of Peru, about 4,600 metres (15,092 ft) high. It is situated in the Ayacucho Region, Lucanas Province, on the border of the districts of Carmen Salcedo and Pukyu. By the local people the mountain is venerated as an apu.

The archaeological site of Quriwayrachina lies near Inka Pallanka.
