= San Juan District, Castrovirreyna =

Coordinates: 13.2034°S 75.6345°W

San Juan District
- District
- Interactive map of San Juan District
- Country: Peru
- Region: Huancavelica
- Province: Castrovirreyna
- Founded: January 12, 1942
- Capital: San Juan

Area
  - Total: 207.25 km^{2} (80.02 sq mi)
- Elevation: 1,920 m (6,300 ft)

Population (2005 census)
  - Total: 697
  - Density: 3.36/km^{2} (8.71/sq mi)
- Time zone: UTC-5 (PET)
- UBIGEO: 090410

San Juan District is one of thirteen districts of the province Castrovirreyna in Peru.
