= Waytayuq =

Mountain in Peru

- Location within Peru

Highest point
- Elevation: 4,800 m (15,700 ft)
- Coordinates: 14°26′49″S 73°51′36″W

Geography
- Location: Peru, Ayacucho Region
- Parent range: Andes

Waytayuq (Quechua wayta crest; wild flower; the whistling of the wind, -yuq a suffix to indicate ownership, "the one with a crest", "the one with wild flowers" or "the one with the whistling of the wind", Hispanicized spelling Huaytayoc) is a mountain in the Andes of Peru, about 4,800 m (15,748 ft) high. It is situated in the Ayacucho Region, Lucanas Province, on the border of the districts of Carmen Salcedo and Chipao. Waytayuq lies south of Chunta.
