= Pichjajocha =

Mountain in Peru

- Location within Peru

Highest point
- Elevation: 4,600 m (15,100 ft)
- Coordinates: 14°24′54″S 73°54′17″W

Geography
- Location: Peru, Ayacucho Region
- Parent range: Andes

Pichjajocha (possibly from Quechua pichqa five, cocha lake) is a mountain in the Andes of Peru, about 4,600 m (15,092 ft) high. It is situated in the Ayacucho Region, Lucanas Province, on the border of the districts of Carmen Salcedo and Chipao, southeast of Andamarca.
