= Quriwayrachina, Ayacucho =

Archaeological site in Peru

Quriwayrachina
- Cultures: Inca
- Location: Peru, Ayacucho Region, Lucanas Province
- Region: Andes

Quriwayrachina, Quri Wayrachina (Quechua quri gold, wayrachina a special oven for smelting metal, "oven for smelting gold"), Hatun Quriwayrachina or Hatun Quri Wayrachina (Quechua hatun big, also spelled Qatun Quriwayrachina) is an archaeological site of the Inca period in Peru located in the Ayacucho Region, Lucanas Province, Carmen Salcedo District. It lies near the mountain Inka Pallanka which is venerated as an apu by the people of the area. There are two platforms which are known as Hatun Quri Wayrachina and Huch'uy Quri Wayrachina (Quechua huch'uy small, also spelled Uchuy Quriwayrachina) by the locals. On April 20, 2011, the site was declared a National Cultural Heritage by Resolución Viceministerial No. 459-2011-VMPCIC-MC.
