= Saisa District =

Coordinates: 14°41′38″S 74°07′27″W

Saisa Saysa
- District
- Interactive map of Saisa
- Country: Peru
- Region: Ayacucho
- Province: Lucanas
- Founded: July 8, 1964
- Capital: Saisa

Government
  - Mayor: Regulo Montoya Cantoral

Area
  - Total: 585.4 km^{2} (226.0 sq mi)
- Elevation: 3,075 m (10,089 ft)

Population (2005 census)
  - Total: 576
  - Density: 0.984/km^{2} (2.55/sq mi)
- Time zone: UTC-5 (PET)
- UBIGEO: 050614

Saisa District is one of twenty-one districts of the province Lucanas in Peru.
