= San Juan District, Lucanas =

Coordinates: 14°41′38″S 74°07′27″W

San Juan District
- District
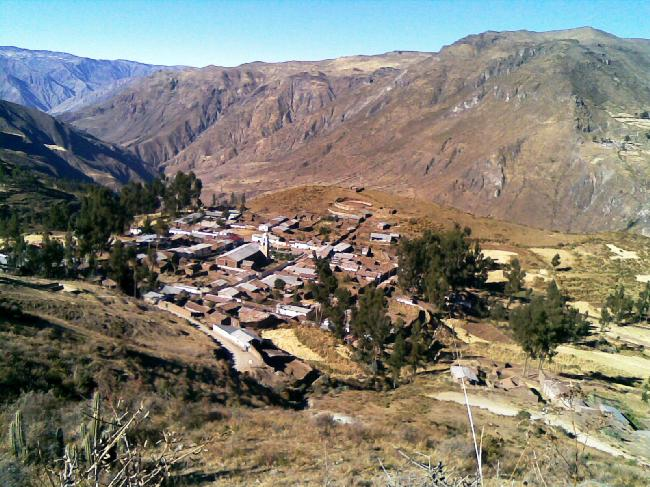
- Interactive map of San Juan District
- Country: Peru
- Region: Ayacucho
- Province: Lucanas
- Founded: August 29, 1921
- Capital: San Juan

Government
  - Mayor: Americo Orlando Peñafiel Garcia

Area
  - Total: 44.59 km^{2} (17.22 sq mi)
- Elevation: 3,282 m (10,768 ft)

Population (2005 census)
  - Total: 646
  - Density: 14.5/km^{2} (37.5/sq mi)
- Time zone: UTC-5 (PET)
- UBIGEO: 050616

San Juan District is one of twenty-one districts of the province Lucanas in Peru.
