= Misapata (Cabana-Lucanas) =

Mountain in Peru

- Location within Peru

Highest point
- Elevation: 4,400 m (14,400 ft)
- Coordinates: 14°28′48″S 74°09′43″W

Geography
- Location: Peru, Ayacucho Region, Lucanas Province
- Parent range: Andes

Misapata (Quechua misa table, pata elevated place; above, at the top; edge, bank, shore, also spelled Mesapata) is a mountain in the Andes of Peru, about 4,400 metres (14,436 ft) high. It is situated in the Ayacucho Region, Lucanas Province, on the border of the districts of Cabana and Lucanas. It lies southwest of Anqasi and Inka Wasi.
