= Leoncio Prado District, Lucanas =

Coordinates: 14°41′38″S 74°07′27″W

Leoncio Prado
- District
- Interactive map of Leoncio Prado
- Country: Peru
- Region: Ayacucho
- Province: Lucanas
- Founded: June 14, 1940
- Capital: Tambo Quemado

Government
  - Mayor: Mario Adan Alfaro Pacase

Area
  - Total: 1,053.6 km^{2} (406.8 sq mi)
- Elevation: 2,685 m (8,809 ft)

Population (2005 census)
  - Total: 1,632
  - Density: 1.549/km^{2} (4.012/sq mi)
- Time zone: UTC-5 (PET)
- UBIGEO: 050609

Leoncio Prado District is one of twenty-one districts of the province Lucanas in Peru.
