= Capillas District =

Coordinates: 13.2931°S 75.5423°W

Capillas
- District
- Interactive map of Capillas
- Country: Peru
- Region: Huancavelica
- Province: Castrovirreyna
- Founded: January 22, 1941
- Capital: Capillas

Area
  - Total: 397.95 km^{2} (153.65 sq mi)
- Elevation: 3,213 m (10,541 ft)

Population (2005 census)
  - Total: 1,884
  - Density: 4.734/km^{2} (12.26/sq mi)
- Time zone: UTC-5 (PET)
- UBIGEO: 090404

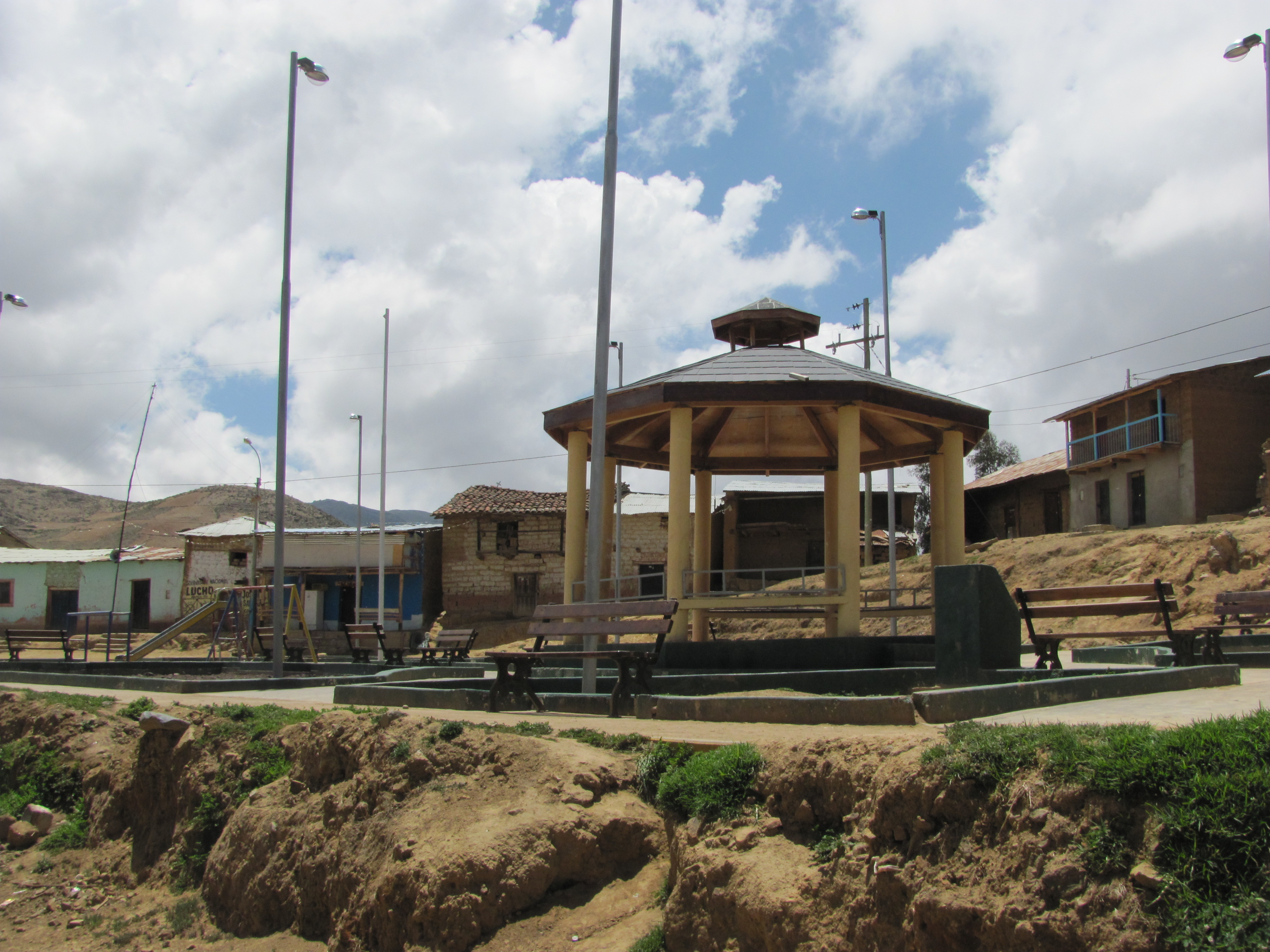

Capillas District is one of thirteen districts of the province Castrovirreyna in Peru.
