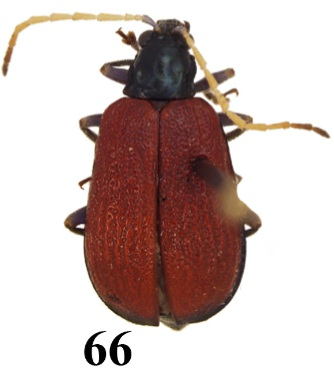
- Cochabamba chrysopleura

Scientific classification
- Kingdom: Animalia
- Phylum: Arthropoda
- Clade: Pancrustacea
- Class: Insecta
- Order: Coleoptera
- Suborder: Polyphaga
- Infraorder: Cucujiformia
- Family: Chrysomelidae
- Tribe: Luperini
- Subtribe: Diabroticina
- Genus: Cochabamba; Bechyné, 1955

= Cochabamba (beetle) =

Genus of leaf beetles

Cochabamba is a genus of beetles belonging to the family Chrysomelidae.

== Species ==
- Cochabamba chacoensis (Bowditch, 1911)
- Cochabamba chrysopleura (Harold, 1875)
- Cochabamba diversicolor (Baly, 1890)
- Cochabamba erythrodera (Baly, 1879)
- Cochabamba marginata (Harold, 1875)
- Cochabamba mera (Bechyne, 1956)
- Cochabamba polychroma Bechyne, 1956
- Cochabamba rugulosa (Baly, 1886)
- Cochabamba variolosa (Jacoby, 1878)
