= Quchapampa (Ayacucho) =

Lake in Peru

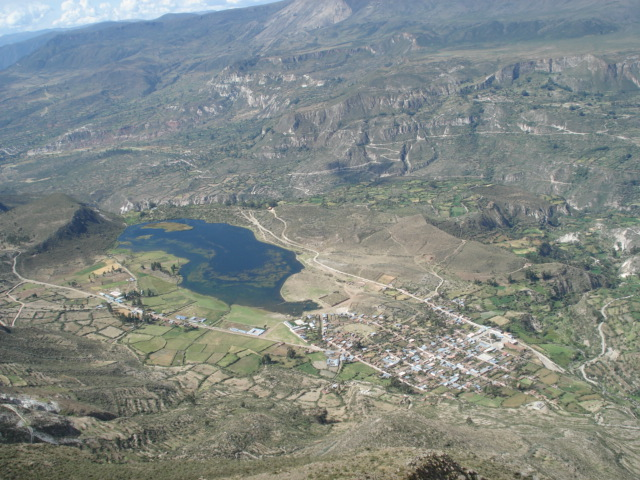
- The lake Quchapampa and the village Aucará

- Location within Peru
- Location: Ayacucho Region
- Coordinates: 14°16′15″S 73°58′23″W
- Basin countries: Peru
- Surface elevation: 3,222 m (10,571 ft)

Quchapampa (Quechua qucha lake, pampa a large plain, "lake plain", Hispanicized spelling Ccochabamba, Jocha Pampa) is a lake in Peru located in the Ayacucho Region, Lucanas Province, Aucara District. It is situated at a height of about 3,222 m (10,571 ft) near Aucará.
