= Usqunta =

Archaeological site in Peru

- Interactive map of Usqunta
- 14°17′45″S 74°11′08″W
- Location: Peru, Ayacucho Region, Lucanas Province
- Region: Andes
- Part of: Intihuatana

Usqunta (also spelled Oscconta, Osqonta or Uscunta) is an archaeological site in the Ayacucho Region in Peru. It was declared a National Cultural Heritage by Resolución Directoral National No. 024/INC on January 12, 2009. Usqunta is located in the Lucanas Province, on the border of the districts of Aucara, Cabana and Lucanas. It is situated on a mountain of that name (also spelled Osconta or Usjunta) which reaches about 4,400 m (14,436 ft) above sea level.

The prehispanic sites named Usqunta I and Usqunta II are also known as Inti Watana II and Inti Watana III.
