= Lucanas province =

Coordinates: 14°41′38″S 74°07′26″W

Lucanas
- Province
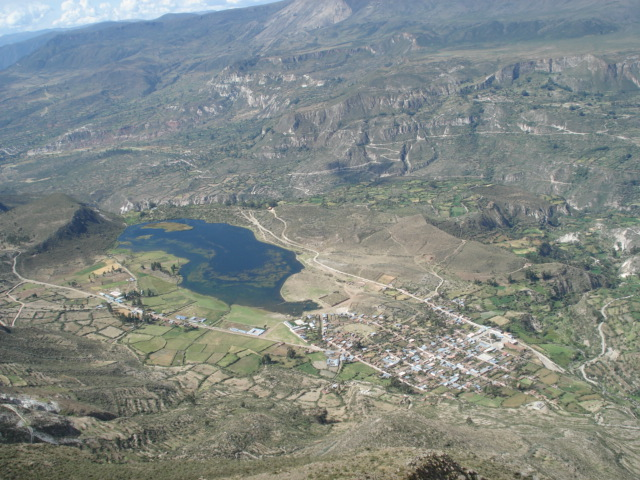
- The lake named Quchapampa and the village of Aucara in the Lucanas Province

- Location of Lucanas in the Ayacucho Region
- Country: Peru
- Region: Ayacucho
- Capital: Puquio

Government
  - Mayor: Luis Alfonso Moya Mora

Area
  - Total: 14,494.64 km^{2} (5,596.41 sq mi)

Population
  - Total: 51,328
  - Density: 3.5412/km^{2} (9.1716/sq mi)
- UBIGEO: 0506

Lucanas is the largest province in the Ayacucho Region in Peru. Its seat is Puquio.

== Geography ==
Some of the highest mountains of the province are Rasuwillka and Qarwarasu. Other mountains are listed below:

- Anqasi
- Anta P'ukru
- Anta Urqu
- Aqu P'ukru
- Aqu Urqu
- Atuq Wachana
- Aya Qullqa
- Chunta
- Ichhu Qutu
- Inka Pallanka
- Inka Paqcha
- Inka Wasi
- Jayuni
- Kimsa Saywa
- Kuntur Sinqa
- Kunturillu
- Maranniyuq
- Misapata (Cabana)
- Misapata (Cab.-Luc.)
- Misa Q'asa
- Misa Urqu
- Pichqaqucha
- Puka Punchu
- Puka Salla
- Phiruru
- Phiruruchayuq
- P'unqu Q'asa
- Qarwa Uqhu
- Qullpa Punta
- Quri Punchu
- Quri Wayrachina
- Qurip Sunqun
- Q'illu Mach'ay
- Q'illu Q'asa
- Q'illu Urqu
- Ruru Rumi
- Sallqan Tiwa
- Sapan Urqu
- Saywa
- Saywapata
- Silla Q'asa
- Sura Q'asa
- Surapata
- Suruqchi
- Titi Q'asa
- Uqi
- Urqunqucha
- Waman Pirqa
- Wamanrasu
- Wamanripa
- Wank'a Sinqa
- Waych'ayuq
- Waytayuq
- Yana Qaqa
- Yana Ranra
- Yana Urqu
- Yana Yana
- Yunka
- Yuraq Pata
- Yuraq Sayana

Some of the largest lakes of the province are as follows:

- Anqasqucha
- Apiñaqucha
- Chawpiqucha
- Islaqucha
- Parqaqucha
- Pukaqucha
- Quchapampa
- Sawaqucha
- Suyt'uqucha
- Tunkuqucha
- T'urpuqucha
- Urqunqucha
- Wat'aqucha
- Yawriwiri Lake

== Political division ==
The province is divided into twenty-one districts.

- Aucara (Aucara)
- Cabana (Cabana)
- Carmen Salcedo (Carmen Salcedo)
- Chaviña (Chaviña)
- Chipao (Chipao)
- Huac-Huas (Huac-Huas)
- Laramate (Laramate)
- Leoncio Prado (Leoncio Prado)
- Llauta (Llauta)
- Lucanas (Lucanas)
- Ocaña (Ocaña)
- Otoca (Otoca)
- Puquio (Puquio)
- Saisa (Saisa)
- San Cristóbal (San Cristóbal)
- San Juan (San Juan)
- San Pedro (San Pedro)
- San Pedro de Palco (San Pedro de Palco)
- Sancos (Sancos)
- Santa Ana de Huaycahuacho (Santa Ana de Huaycahuacho)
- Santa Lucía (Santa Lucía)

== Ethnic groups ==
The province is inhabited by indigenous citizens of Quechua descent. Spanish is the language which the majority of the population (57.15%) learnt to speak in childhood, 42.37% of the residents started speaking using the Quechua language and 0.25% using Aymara (2007 Peru Census).

== Archaeology ==
There are more than twenty archaeological sites in the province which were declared a National Cultural Heritage. Some of the most important sites of the province are Aya Muqu, Chipaw Marka, Hatun Misapata, Kanichi, Nina Kiru, Ñawpallaqta, Puka Urqu, Quriwayrachina, Q'asa Pata, Usqunta and Waman Pirqa.

== See also ==
- Q'illumayu
