= Anqasi (Ayacucho) =

Mountain in Peru

- Location within Peru

Highest point
- Elevation: 4,400 m (14,400 ft)
- Coordinates: 14°26′21″S 74°09′09″W

Geography
- Location: Peru, Ayacucho Region, Lucanas Province
- Parent range: Andes

Anqasi (Quechua for cobalt salt used for dyeing, hispanicized spelling Angasi) is a mountain in the Andes of Peru, about 4,400 metres (14,436 ft) high. It is situated in the Ayacucho Region, Lucanas Province, Cabana District. It lies north of a mountain named Inka Wasi.
