= Lake Apiñaccocha =

Lake in Peru

- Location within Peru
- Location: Peru; Ayacucho Region
- Coordinates: 14°38′17.8″S 73°54′16.3″W
- Surface elevation: 4,404 m (14,449 ft)

Lake Apiñaccocha (possibly from Quechua apiña, maswa a flowering, partly eatable plant, qucha lake) is a lake in Peru located in the Ayacucho Region, Lucanas Province, in the districts of Chipao and Puquio. It is situated at a height of approximately 4,404 metres (14,449 ft). Lake Apiñaccocha lies northeast of the town of Puquio and southeast of the lakes Yaurihuiri and Urqunqucha.

== See also ==
- List of lakes in Peru
