= Primitivo Evanán Poma =

Peruvian folk artist (1944–2026)

- Born: 18 July 1944; Sarhua, Víctor Fajardo, Ayacucho, Peru
- Died: 29 September 2026 (aged 82)
- Known for: Tablas de Sarhua (Sarhua boards)

Primitivo Evanán Poma (18 July 1944-29 September 2026) was a Peruvian artist. He specialized in Sarhua boards, a traditional Peruvian art; historically, Sarhua boards were given by relatives during the Tabla Apaykuy ceremony after the construction of a new house. His work is in the National Museum of Denmark. In 2021, he was declared a "Meritorious Personality of Culture" by the Peruvian Ministry of Culture, in a decree signed by Alejandro Neyra.

== Early life ==
Evanán was born on 18 July 1944 in the Sarhua District of Ayacucho, Peru. He began painting Sarhua boards when he was eight and moved to Lima at the age of 14.

== Personal life and death ==
He died on 29 September 2026.

His daughter Venuca Evanán also became a Sarhua board artist.
