= Yana Uqsha (Ayacucho) =

Mountain in Peru

- Location within Peru

Highest point
- Elevation: 4,600 m (15,100 ft)
- Coordinates: 13°54′18″S 74°36′33″W

Geography
- Location: Peru, Ayacucho Region, Huanca Sancos Province
- Parent range: Andes

Yana Uqsha (Quechua yana black, very dark, uqsha (locally), uqsa high altitude grass, also spelled Yana Ucsha) is a mountain in the Andes of Peru, about 4,600 m (15,092 ft) high. It is situated in the Ayacucho Region, Huanca Sancos Province, on the border of the districts of Lucanamarca and Sancos. Yana Uqsha lies south of Yanawaqra and Yuraq Urqu.
