= Vilcanchos District =

Coordinates: 13.6117°S 74.5319°W

Vilcanchos
- District
- Coat of arms

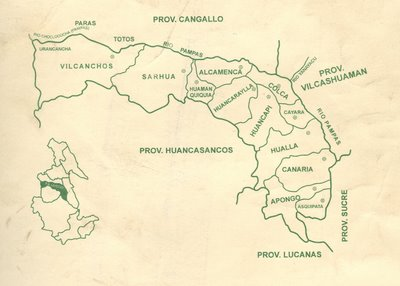
- Location of Vilcanchos in the Víctor Fajardo province
- Country: Peru
- Region: Lima
- Province: Víctor Fajardo
- Founded: November 14, 1910
- Capital: Vilcanchos
- Subdivisions: 20 populated centers

Government
  - Mayor: José Huamaní Godoy (2007-2010)

Area
  - Total: 498.54 km^{2} (192.49 sq mi)
- Elevation: 2,982 m (9,783 ft)

Population (2005 census)
  - Total: 2,843
  - Density: 5.703/km^{2} (14.77/sq mi)
- Time zone: UTC-5 (PET)
- Website: munivilcanchos.gob.pe

Vilcanchos is a district in the western Víctor Fajardo Province in Peru. It is bordered by Santiago de Chocorvos District (Huaytará Province) in the west, Totos District (Cangallo Province) in the north, Sarhua District in the east, and Santiago de Lucanamarca District (Huanca Sancos Province) in the south.

== Geography ==
One of the highest peaks of the district is Llallawi at approximately 4,600 m (15,100 ft). Other mountains are listed below:

- Anta Pukara
- Aqu Marka
- Aya Puma
- Chaka Urqu
- Iskay Wasi
- Luru Pukyu
- Parya
- Pillusuni
- Puka Q'asa
- P'unqu Sura
- Qharway Pata
- Q'illu Kancha
- Q'iru Pampa
- Suyt'u
- Tunan Kancha
- Turuyuq
- Thuxllani
- Uqhulla
- Ushpa Q'asa
- Wamanripa
- Yana Phiruru
- Yawrilla

== Ethnic groups ==
The people in the district are mainly indigenous citizens of Quechua descent. Quechua is the language which the majority of the population (94.99%) learnt to speak in childhood, 4.86% of the residents started speaking using the Spanish language (2007 Peru Census).
