= Ñawpallaqta =

Ñawpallaqta or Ñawpa Llaqta (Quechua ñawpa ancient, llaqta place (village, town, city, country, nation), "ancient place", also spelled Naupallacta, Ñaupa Llacta, Ñaupa Llaqta, Ñaupallacta, Ñaupallaqta, Nawpallacta) may refer to:

- Ñawpallaqta, Huanca Sancos, an archaeological site in the Huanca Sancos Province, Ayacucho Region, Peru
- Ñawpallaqta, Fajardo, an archaeological site in the Fajardo Province, Ayacucho Region, Peru
- Ñawpallaqta, Lucanas, an archaeological site on top of a mountain of that name in the Lucanas Province, Ayacucho Region, Peru
