= Kinwamayu =

- Etymology: Quechua

Location
- Country: Peru
- Region: Ayacucho Region

Physical characteristics
- Mouth: Pampas River

Kinwamayu (Quechua kinwa a plant (Chenopodium quinoa), mayu river, Hispanicized spelling Ccuenhuamayo) is a river in Peru located in the Ayacucho Region, Victor Fajardo Province, Huancapi District. It is an affluent of the Pampas River.

Kinwamayu originates in the Canaria District. Here, it is named Saqsara (Saccsara). It flows in a mainly northern direction following the border with the Huaya District. In the Huancapi District, it flows along the villages Wisk'achayuq (Viscachayoj), Tuturaqucha (Totoraqocha), Aqu Punku (Acco Punco) and Qucha (Ccocha) until reaching the town Huancapi. Now, it changes its name to Huancapi. Its direction is mainly to the north. The confluence of the rivers Kinwamayu and Pampas is north of the village Aya Urqu (Ayaorcco).

There is a village named Kinwamayu (Ccenhuamayo) east of the river in the Huaya District.

== See also ==
- Ñawpallaqta
- Willkamayu
