= Ampatuyoc =

Ampatuyoc (Quechua: hamp'atu frog, -yuq a suffix, "the one with a frog (or frogs)", also spelled Hamp'atuyuq, Ccampatuyocc) may refer to the following mountains in Peru:

- Ampatuyoc (Ayacucho)
- Ampatuyoc (Churcampa)
- Ampatuyoc (Pachamarca)
