= Sarhua District =

Sarhua Sarwa
- District
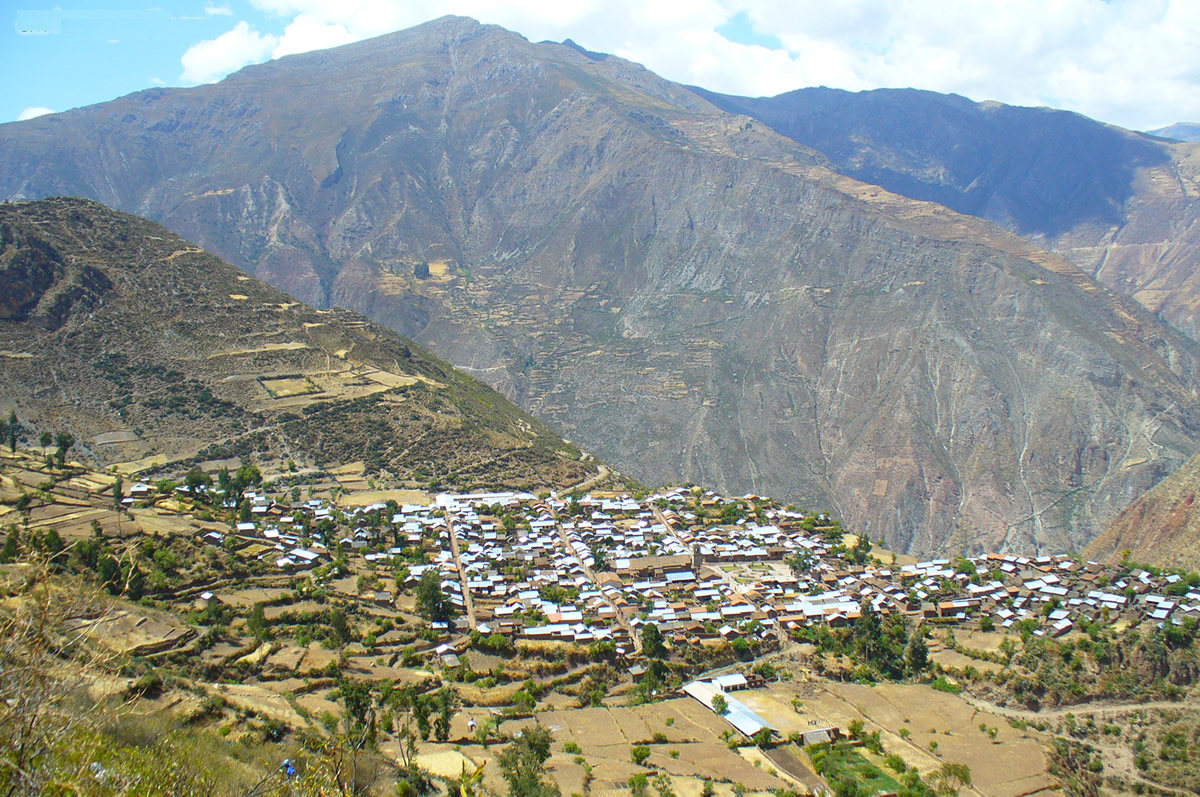
- Sarhua city

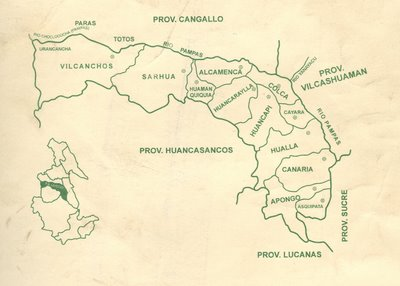
- Location of Sarhua in the Víctor Fajardo province
- Coordinates: 13°40′S 74°19′W
- Country: Peru
- Region: Ayacucho
- Province: Víctor Fajardo
- Founded: November 14, 1910
- Capital: Sarhua
- Subdivisions: 20 populated centers

Government
  - Mayor: Rómulo Carhuapoma Huamaní (2007-2010)

Area
  - Total: 524.94 km^{2} (202.68 sq mi)
- Elevation: 2,982 m (9,783 ft)

Population (2005 census)
  - Total: 5,081
  - Density: 9.679/km^{2} (25.07/sq mi)
- Time zone: UTC-5 (PET)
- Website: munisarhua.gob.pe

Sarhua is a district in the western Víctor Fajardo Province in Ayacucho, Peru. It is bordered by Vilcanchos District on the west, Totos District (Cangallo Province) on the north, Huamanquiquia District on the east, and Santiago de Lucanamarca District (Huanca Sancos Province) on the south.

== Geography ==
Some of the highest mountains of the district are listed below:

- Chunta
- Hamp'atuyuq
- Huch'uy Pirwalla
- Llallawi
- Millka
- Paqariq Qaqa
- Puka Mach'ay
- Puywanniyuq
- Phiruru
- Qarwa Pata
- Qucha Urqu
- Quchayuq Urqu
- Tullpa Rumi

== Ethnic groups ==
The people in the district are mainly indigenous citizens of Quechua descent. Quechua is the language which the majority of the population (98.00%) learnt to speak in childhood, 1.90% of the residents started speaking using the Spanish language (2007 Peru Census).

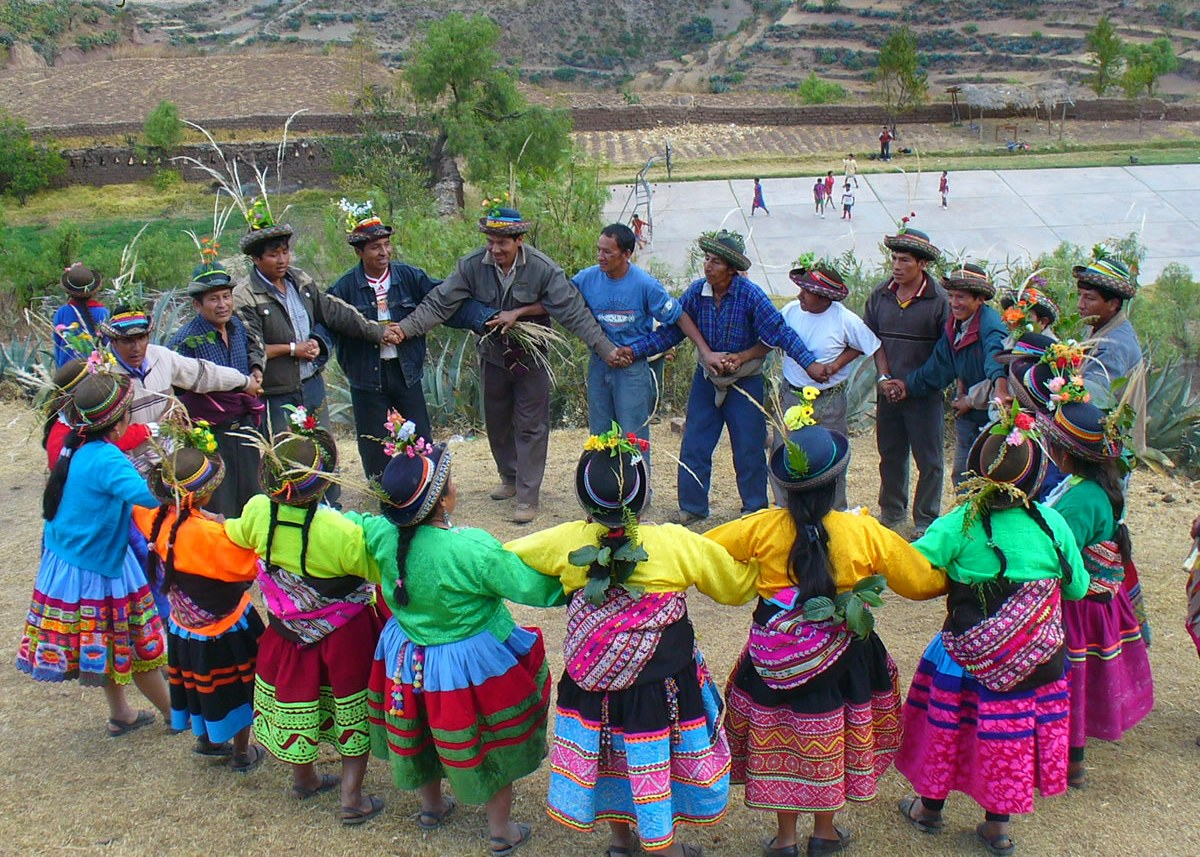
Qachwa dance

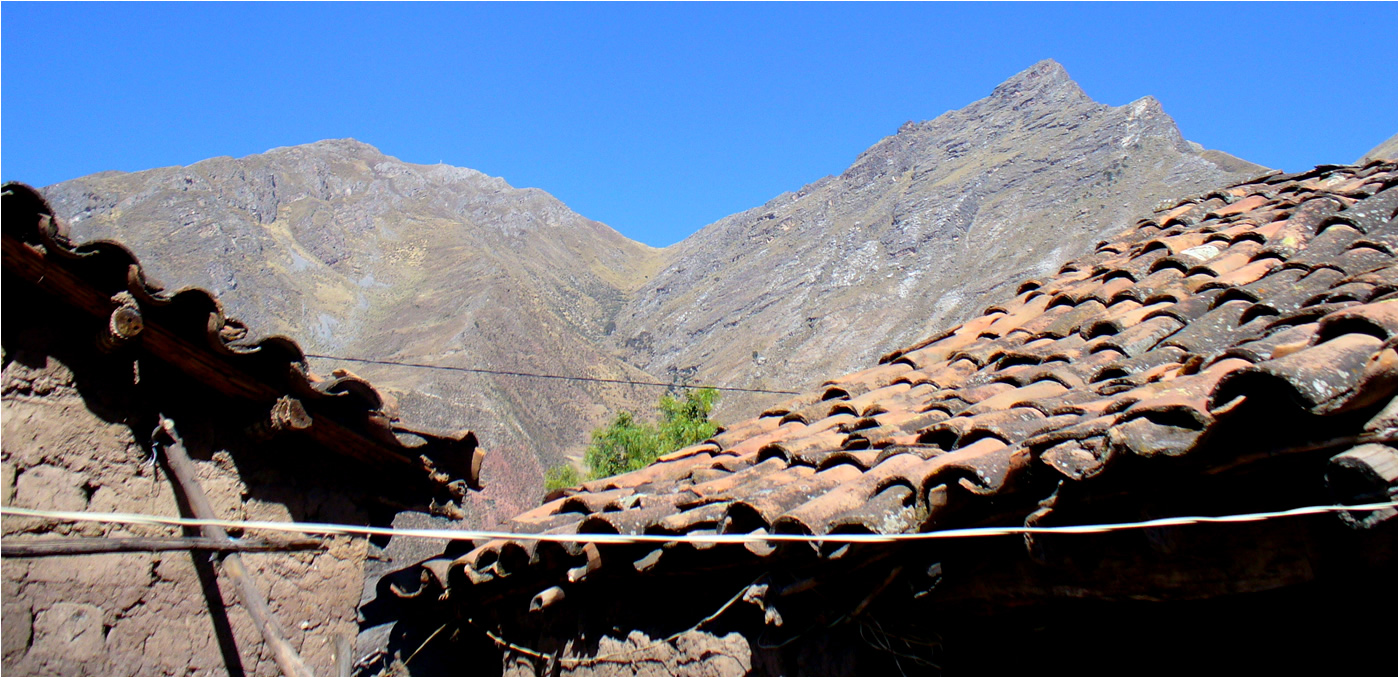
Apu urqu

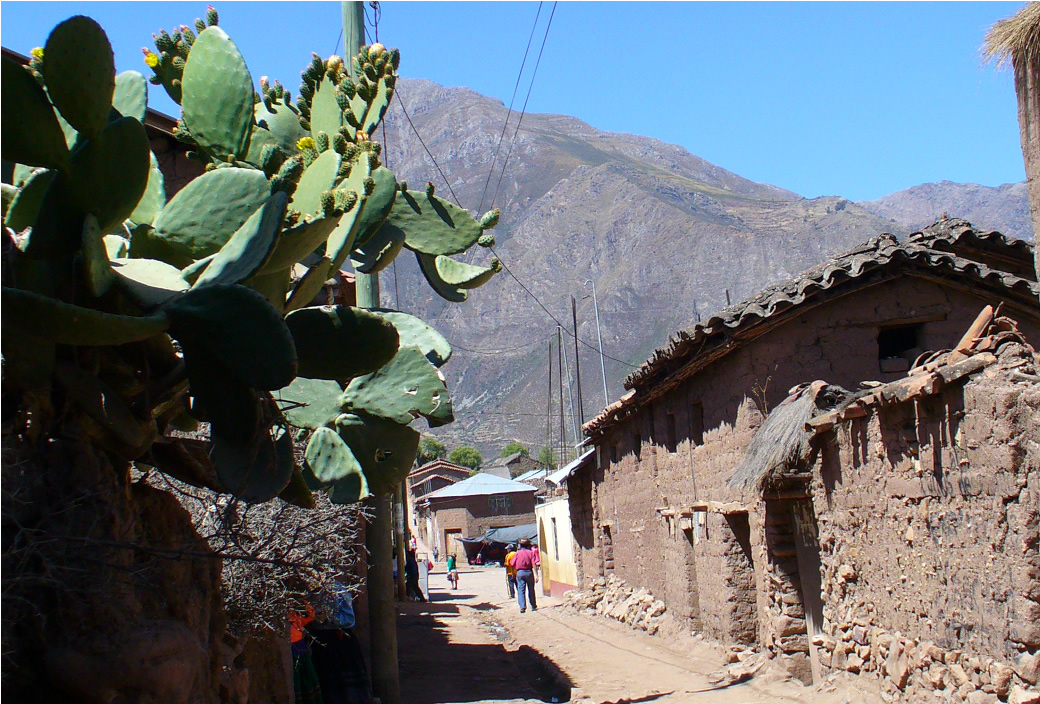
Sarhua roads

== See also ==
- Pukara
