= Sancos District, Huanca Sancos =

Coordinates: 13.9201°S 74.3339°W

Sancos District
- District
- Interactive map of Sancos District
- Country: Peru
- Region: Ayacucho
- Province: Huanca Sancos
- Capital: Huanca Sancos

Government
  - Mayor: Cirilo Pacheco Vilchez

Area
  - Total: 1,289.7 km^{2} (498.0 sq mi)
- Elevation: 3,408 m (11,181 ft)

Population (2005 census)
  - Total: 4,144
  - Density: 3.213/km^{2} (8.322/sq mi)
- Time zone: UTC-5 (PET)
- UBIGEO: 050301

Sancos District is one of four districts of the Huanca Sancos Province in Peru.

== Geography ==
One of the highest peaks of the district is Yana Waqra at approximately 4,730 m (15,520 ft). Other mountains are listed below:

- Añasniyuq
- Aqu Chupa
- Aqu Muqu
- Aqu Qucha
- Aqu Q'asa
- Atuqpa Waqanan
- Chakata
- Challwana
- Chawpi Urqu
- Chiri Pampa
- Chuntani
- Chupa Urqu
- Chhullunku
- Ch'uspi Sura
- Hatun Pampa
- Ichhu Urqu
- Inka Wasi
- Kuntur Sinqa
- Kunturillu
- Lluxiyuq
- Mach'ay Wasi
- Millpuq
- Ninalla Urqu
- Pampa Wasi
- Pillku Kancha
- Pinchayuq
- Pirwalla
- Pisqu Pallana
- Puka Kancha
- Puka P'unqu
- Puka Saywa
- Puma Tiyana
- Puywanniyuq
- Phiruruyuq
- Qillqalla
- Qillqalla Q'asa
- Qucha Kancha
- Qucha P'ukru
- Qucha Wasi
- Qullpa
- Q'asa Wasi
- Q'illu Q'asa
- Q'illu Urqu
- Rayusqa
- Ruphasqa
- Ruq'a Urqu
- Sach'a Urqu
- Taya Pata
- Titankayuq
- Uqi Muqu Qucha
- Uqi Urqu
- Urqu Kancha
- Usnu
- Wakana Urqu
- Wara Wara
- Waraqu
- Wawqiyuq
- Waychu
- Wayllas
- Wayra Pata
- Wayrana Pata
- Wichhu
- Wichinka
- Yana Chaka
- Yana Kusma
- Yana Q'asa
- Yana Sura
- Yana Uqsha
- Yana Urqu

== Ethnic groups ==
The people in the district are mainly indigenous citizens of Quechua descent. Quechua is the language which the majority of the population (60.61%) learnt to speak in childhood, 38.51% of the residents started speaking using the Spanish language (2007 Peru Census).
