= Kinwaqucha =

Kinwaqucha (Quechua for "quinoa lake") may refer to:

- Kinwaqucha (Ancash), a lake in the Ancash Region, Peru
- Kinwaqucha (Ayacucho), a lake in the Ayacucho Region, Peru
- Kinwaqucha (Huánuco), a lake at a mountain of that name in the Huánuco Region, Peru
