= Willkamayu =

- Etymology: Quechua

Location
- Country: Peru
- Region: Ayacucho Region

Physical characteristics
- Source: confluence of the rivers Urqu Mayu and Kachimayu
- Mouth: Pampas River

Willkamayu (Quechua, hispanicized spelling Huyllcamayo) is a river in Peru located in the Ayacucho Region, Victor Fajardo Province, Huancapi District. It is an affluent of the Pampas River.

Willkamayu originates near the village Llusita at the confluence of the rivers Urqu Mayu (Orcco Mayo) and Kachimayu (Cachimayo) of the Huancaraylla District. Its direction is mainly to the north. It flows almost parallel to Kinwamayu east of the Willkamayu. Near the village of Willka (Huilcca) Willkamayu meets the Pampas River.
