= Tawlli Urqu =

Mountain in Peru

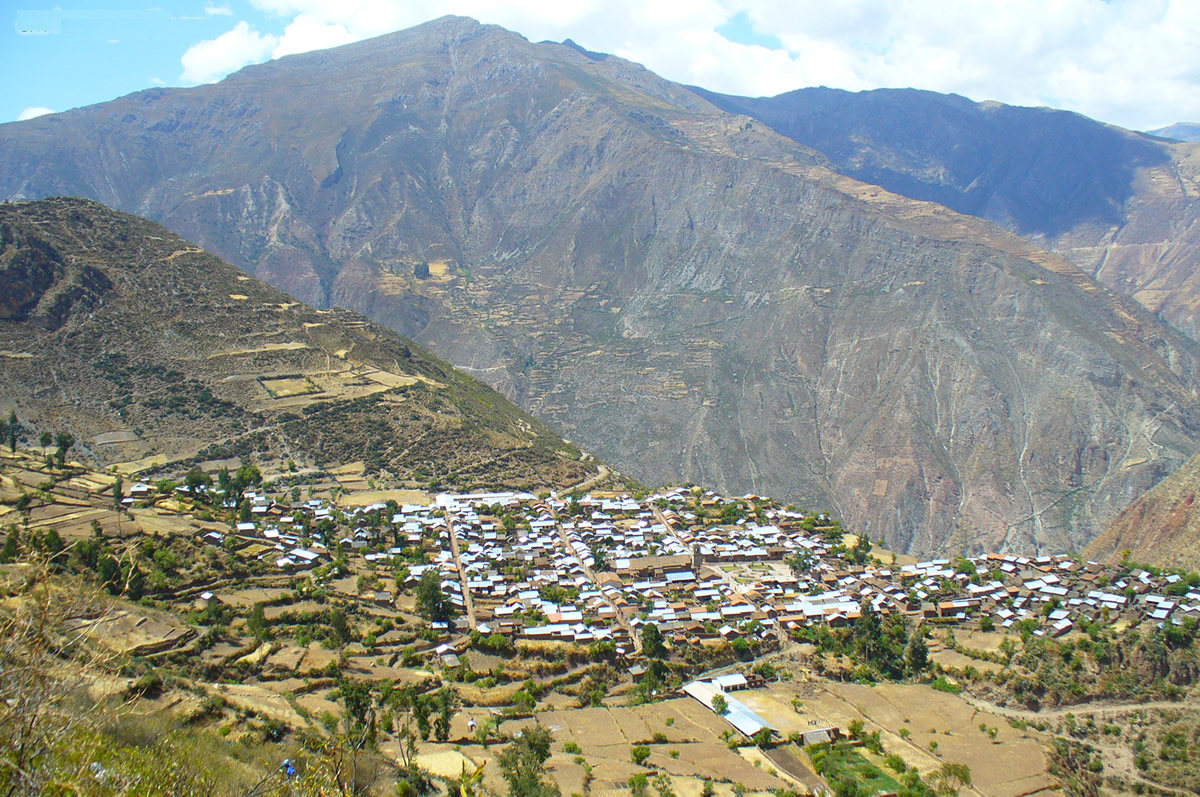
- Tawlli Urqu (in the background on the right) as seen from Sarhua

Highest point
- Elevation: 4,000 m (13,000 ft)
- Coordinates: 13°42′16″S 74°16′37″W

Geography
- Location within Peru
- Location: Peru, Ayacucho Region, Víctor Fajardo Province
- Parent range: Andes

Tawlli Urqu (Quechua tawlli a kind of legume, urqu mountain, "tawlli mountain", also spelled Taulli Orcco) is a mountain in the Andes of Peru, about 4,000 metres (13,123 ft) high. It is situated in the Ayacucho Region, Víctor Fajardo Province, Huamanquiquia District, southeast of Sarhua.
