= Apongo District =

Coordinates: 13.9954°S 73.9317°W

Apongo
- District
- Interactive map of Apongo
- Country: Peru
- Region: Ayacucho
- Province: Víctor Fajardo
- Founded: May 13, 1936
- Capital: Apongo

Government
  - Mayor: Sabina Cusi Chamba

Area
  - Total: 171.58 km^{2} (66.25 sq mi)
- Elevation: 3,068 m (10,066 ft)

Population (2005 census)
  - Total: 630
  - Density: 3.7/km^{2} (9.5/sq mi)
- Time zone: UTC-5 (PET)
- UBIGEO: 051003

Apongo District is one of twelve districts of the province Víctor Fajardo in Peru.

== Ethnic groups ==
The people in the district are mainly indigenous citizens of Quechua descent. Quechua is the language which the majority of the population (87.92%) learnt to speak in childhood, 11.83% of the residents started speaking using the Spanish language (2007 Peru Census).
