= Yanawaqra =

Mountain in Peru

- Location within Peru

Highest point
- Elevation: 4,730 m (15,520 ft)
- Coordinates: 13°52′58″S 74°36′18″W

Geography
- Location: Peru, Ayacucho Region, Huanca Sancos Province
- Parent range: Andes

Yanawaqra (Quechua yana black, waqra horn, "black horn", Hispanicized spelling Yanahuaccra) is a mountain in the Andes of Peru, about 4,730 metres (15,518 ft) high. It is situated in the Ayacucho Region, Huanca Sancos Province, on the border of the districts Lucanamarca and Sancos.

== See also ==
- Kunturillu
- Yanakusma
