= Wamanilla =

Archaeological site in Peru

- Misayuq Pata
- Location: Peru, Ayacucho Region
- Region: Andes

Wamanilla or Misayuq Pata (Quechua misa table, -yuq a suffix, pata elevated place; above, at the top; edge, bank, shore, literally "the elevated place (or bank) with a table", also spelled Mesayuqpata) is an archaeological site in the Ayacucho Region in Peru. It was declared a National Cultural Heritage by Resolución Viceministerial Nº 459-2011-VMPCIC-MC of April 20, 2011. It is situated in the Huanca Sancos Province, Sacsamarca District, and in the Víctor Fajardo Province, Huancaraylla District.

Wamanilla (Huamanilla) is also the name of a mountain at the site. It reaches about 4,200 m (13,780 ft) above sea level.
