= Canaria District =

Coordinates: 13.9236°S 73.9050°W

Canaria
- District
- Interactive map of Canaria
- Country: Peru
- Region: Ayacucho
- Province: Víctor Fajardo
- Founded: January 2, 1857
- Capital: Canaria

Government
  - Mayor: Marino Fortunato Raymundo Conde

Area
  - Total: 263.88 km^{2} (101.88 sq mi)
- Elevation: 3,025 m (9,925 ft)

Population (2005 census)
  - Total: 3,415
  - Density: 12.94/km^{2} (33.52/sq mi)
- Time zone: UTC-5 (PET)
- UBIGEO: 051005

Canaria District is one of twelve districts of the province Víctor Fajardo in Peru.

== Ethnic groups ==
The people in the district are mainly indigenous citizens of Quechua descent. Quechua is the language which the majority of the population (69.09%) learnt to speak in childhood, 30.08% of the residents started speaking using the Spanish language (2007 Peru Census).

== See also ==
- Kinwamayu
