= Yuraq Urqu (Ayacucho) =

Mountain in Peru

- Location within Peru

Highest point
- Elevation: 4,640 m (15,220 ft)
- Coordinates: 13°53′44″S 74°35′25″W

Geography
- Location: Peru, Ayacucho Region, Huanca Sancos Province
- Parent range: Andes

Yuraq Urqu (Quechua yuraq white, urqu mountain, "white mountain", also spelled Yuracc Orcco) is a 4,640-metre-high (15,223 ft) mountain in the Andes of Peru. It is situated in the Ayacucho Region, Huanca Sancos Province, Lucanamarca District.Yuraq Urqu lies southeast of Yanawaqra.
