= Cayara District =

Coordinates: 13.7962°S 73.9908°W

Cayara
- District
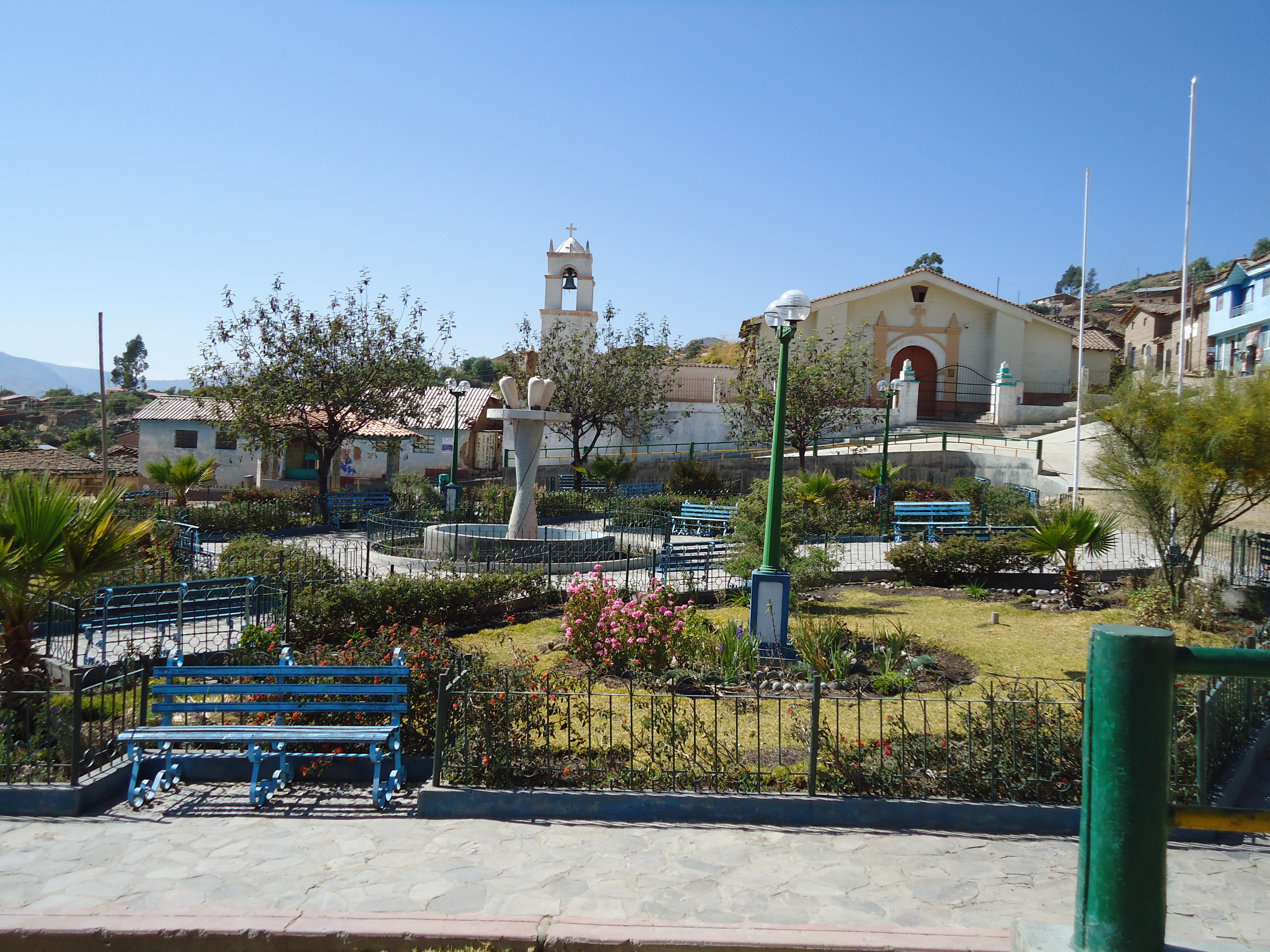
- Interactive map of Cayara
- Country: Peru
- Region: Ayacucho
- Province: Víctor Fajardo
- Founded: January 9, 1960
- Capital: Cayara

Government
  - Mayor: Luciano Pariona Ore

Area
  - Total: 69.25 km^{2} (26.74 sq mi)
- Elevation: 3,164 m (10,381 ft)

Population (2005 census)
  - Total: 1,423
  - Density: 20.55/km^{2} (53.22/sq mi)
- Time zone: UTC-5 (PET)
- UBIGEO: 051006

Cayara District is one of twelve districts of the province Víctor Fajardo in Peru.

== Ethnic groups ==
The people in the district are mainly indigenous citizens of Quechua descent. Quechua is the language which the majority of the population (88.63%) learnt to speak in childhood, 10.73% of the residents started speaking using the Spanish language (2007 Peru Census).

== History ==
In 1988, during Peru's internal conflict, the military killed 39 residents of the district in the Cayara massacre.

== See also ==
- Ñawpallaqta
