= Parya (Ayacucho) =

Mountain in Peru

- Location within Peru

Highest point
- Elevation: 4,862 m (15,951 ft)
- Coordinates: 13°48′20″S 74°37′30″W

Geography
- Location: Peru, Ayacucho Region, Huanca Sancos Province
- Parent range: Andes

Parya (Quechua for reddish, copper or sparrow, Hispanicized spelling Paria) is a 4,862-metre-high (15,951 ft) mountain in the Andes of Peru. It is situated in the Ayacucho Region, Huanca Sancos Province, Lucanamarca District. Parya lies northeast of Qallaqucha.
