= Huancapi =

- Town
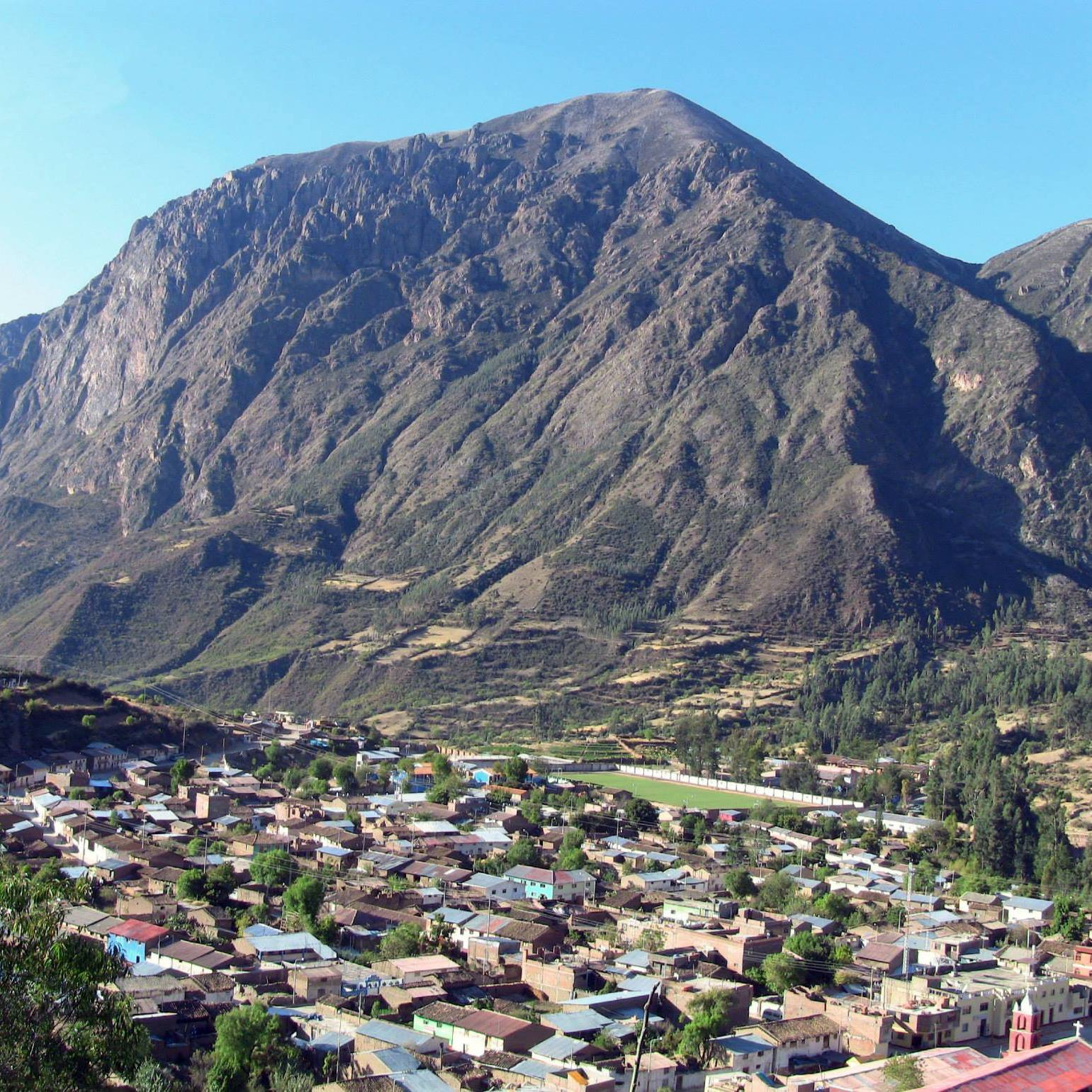

- Location within Peru
- Country: Peru
- Region: Ayacucho
- Province: Víctor Fajardo
- District: Huancapi
- Time zone: UTC-5 (PET)

Huancapi is a town in Central Peru, capital of the province Víctor Fajardo in the region Ayacucho.

== Climate ==
Climate data for Huancapi, elevation 3,117 m (10,226 ft), (1991–2020)
Month	Jan	Feb	Mar	Apr	May	Jun	Jul	Aug	Sep	Oct	Nov	Dec	Year
Mean daily maximum °C (°F)	21.4 (70.5)	20.5 (68.9)	20.2 (68.4)	20.5 (68.9)	21.2 (70.2)	21.0 (69.8)	20.9 (69.6)	21.7 (71.1)	22.5 (72.5)	23.8 (74.8)	24.6 (76.3)	22.8 (73.0)	21.8 (71.2)
Mean daily minimum °C (°F)	8.9 (48.0)	9.0 (48.2)	9.0 (48.2)	7.8 (46.0)	5.6 (42.1)	4.5 (40.1)	4.3 (39.7)	5.3 (41.5)	6.7 (44.1)	7.5 (45.5)	7.8 (46.0)	8.8 (47.8)	7.1 (44.8)
Average precipitation mm (inches)	152.6 (6.01)	154.2 (6.07)	119.8 (4.72)	47.8 (1.88)	11.5 (0.45)	6.7 (0.26)	10.1 (0.40)	13.4 (0.53)	23.5 (0.93)	32.5 (1.28)	42.0 (1.65)	105.5 (4.15)	719.6 (28.33)
Source: National Meteorology and Hydrology Service of Peru
