= Huch'uy Pirwalla =

Mountain in Peru

- Location within Peru

Highest point
- Elevation: 4,600 m (15,100 ft)
- Coordinates: 13°40′04″S 74°26′53″W

Geography
- Location: Peru, Ayacucho Region
- Parent range: Andes

Huch'uy Pirwalla (Quechua huch'uy small, Hispanicized spelling Uchuy Pirhualla) is a mountain in the Andes of Peru, about 4,600 metres (15,092 ft) high. It is situated in the Ayacucho Region, Víctor Fajardo Province, Sarhua District, northeast of Hatun Pirwalla (Quechua hatun big, Hispanicized Catún Pirualla).

Southwest of Huch'uy Pirwalla, beyond the Llallawi valley, there is another mountain of the same name. It lies at 13°40′04″S 74°28′42″W.
