= Asquipata District =

Coordinates: 14.0132°S 73.9326°W

Asquipata Askipata
- District
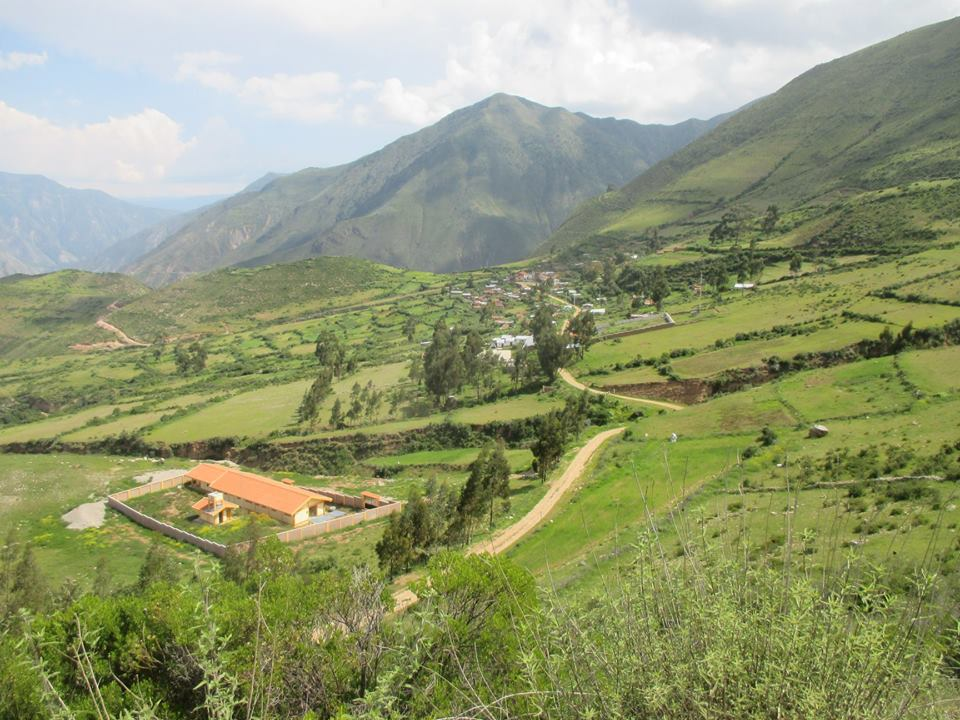
- Interactive map of Asquipata
- Country: Peru
- Region: Ayacucho
- Province: Víctor Fajardo
- Founded: December 23, 1986
- Capital: Asquipata

Government
  - Mayor: Juan Gualberto Huamani Sulca

Area
  - Total: 70.72 km^{2} (27.31 sq mi)
- Elevation: 3,350 m (10,990 ft)

Population (2005 census)
  - Total: 435
  - Density: 6.15/km^{2} (15.9/sq mi)
- Time zone: UTC-5 (PET)
- UBIGEO: 051004

Asquipata District is one of twelve districts of the province Víctor Fajardo in Peru.

== Ethnic groups ==
The people in the district are mainly indigenous citizens of Quechua descent. Quechua is the language which the majority of the population (79.18%) learnt to speak in childhood, 20.82% of the residents started speaking using the Spanish language (2007 Peru Census).
