= Puywanniyuq =

Mountain in Peru

- Location within Peru

Highest point
- Elevation: 4,400 m (14,400 ft)
- Coordinates: 13°40′44″S 74°21′22″W

Geography
- Location: Peru, Ayacucho Region
- Parent range: Andes

Puywanniyuq (Quechua puywan heart of an animal, -ni, -yuq suffixes, "the one with a heart", also spelled Puyhuanniyocc) is a mountain in the Andes of Peru, about 4,400 metres (14,436 ft) high. It is situated in the Ayacucho Region, Víctor Fajardo Province, Sarhua District, southwest of Sarhua.
