= Huancapi District =

Coordinates: 13.7535°S 74.0705°W

Huancapi
- District
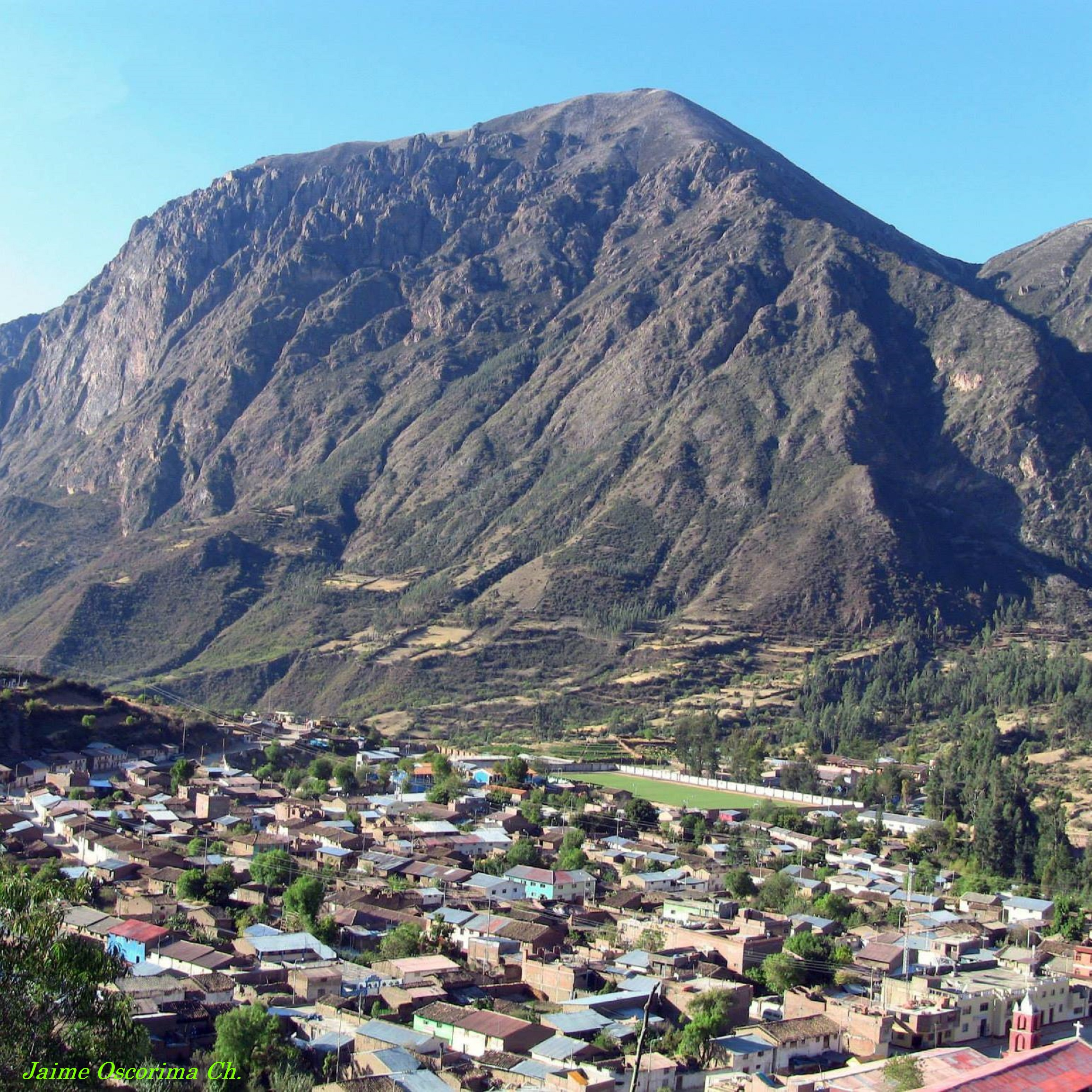
- uancapi
- Interactive map of Huancapi
- Country: Peru
- Region: Ayacucho
- Province: Víctor Fajardo
- Founded: August 16, 1920
- Capital: Huancapi

Government
  - Mayor: Onofrio Huamani Garcia

Area
  - Total: 223.35 km^{2} (86.24 sq mi)
- Elevation: 3,081 m (10,108 ft)

Population (2005 census)
  - Total: 2,460
  - Density: 11.0/km^{2} (28.5/sq mi)
- Time zone: UTC-5 (PET)
- UBIGEO: 051001

Huancapi District is one of twelve districts of the province Víctor Fajardo in Peru.

== Ethnic groups ==
The people in the district are mainly indigenous citizens of Quechua descent. Quechua is the language which the majority of the population (69.47%) learnt to speak in childhood, 30.40% of the residents started speaking using the Spanish language (2007 Peru Census).

== Climate ==
Climate data for Huancapi, elevation 31,317 m (102,746 ft), (1991–2020)
Month	Jan	Feb	Mar	Apr	May	Jun	Jul	Aug	Sep	Oct	Nov	Dec	Year
Mean daily maximum °C (°F)	21.4 (70.5)	20.5 (68.9)	20.2 (68.4)	20.5 (68.9)	21.2 (70.2)	21.0 (69.8)	20.9 (69.6)	21.7 (71.1)	22.5 (72.5)	23.8 (74.8)	24.6 (76.3)	22.8 (73.0)	21.8 (71.2)
Mean daily minimum °C (°F)	8.9 (48.0)	9.0 (48.2)	9.0 (48.2)	7.8 (46.0)	5.6 (42.1)	4.5 (40.1)	4.3 (39.7)	5.3 (41.5)	6.7 (44.1)	7.5 (45.5)	7.8 (46.0)	8.8 (47.8)	7.1 (44.8)
Average precipitation mm (inches)	152.6 (6.01)	154.2 (6.07)	119.8 (4.72)	47.8 (1.88)	11.5 (0.45)	6.7 (0.26)	10.1 (0.40)	13.4 (0.53)	23.5 (0.93)	32.5 (1.28)	42.0 (1.65)	105.5 (4.15)	719.6 (28.33)
Source: National Meteorology and Hydrology Service of Peru

== See also ==
- Kinwamayu
- Ñawpallaqta
- Willkamayu
