= Alcamenca District =

Alcamenca
- District
- Location within Peru
- Coordinates: 13.67°S 74.21°W
- Country: Peru
- Region: Ayacucho
- Province: Víctor Fajardo
- Founded: January 9, 1936
- Capital: Alcamenca

Government
  - Mayor: Edwin Luciano Campos Cisneros

Area
  - Total: 125.11 km^{2} (48.31 sq mi)
- Elevation: 3,200 m (10,500 ft)

Population (2005 census)
  - Total: 1,974
  - Density: 15.78/km^{2} (40.87/sq mi)
- Time zone: UTC-5 (PET)
- UBIGEO: 051002

Alcamenca District is one of twelve districts of the province Víctor Fajardo in Peru.

== Ethnic groups ==
The people in the district are mainly indigenous citizens of Quechua descent. Quechua is the language which the majority of the population (93.45%) learnt to speak in childhood, 6.30% of the residents started speaking using the Spanish language (2007 Peru Census).
