= Chawpi Urqu (Huanca Sancos) =

Mountain in Peru

- Location within Peru

Highest point
- Elevation: 4,400 m (14,400 ft)
- Coordinates: 13°56′08″S 74°31′04″W

Geography
- Location: Peru, Ayacucho Region, Huanca Sancos Province
- Parent range: Andes

Chawpi Urqu (Quechua chawpi middle, center, urqu mountain, "middle mountain", also spelled Chaupi Orcco) is a mountain in the Andes of Peru, about 4,400 m (14,436 ft) high. It is situated in the Ayacucho Region, Huanca Sancos Province, at the border of the districts of Lucanamarca and Sancos.
