= 1983 Lucanamarca massacre =

Massacre perpetrated by the Shining Path in 1983

Coordinates: 13°48′28″S 74°21′06″W

Lucanamarca massacre
- Part of internal conflict in Peru
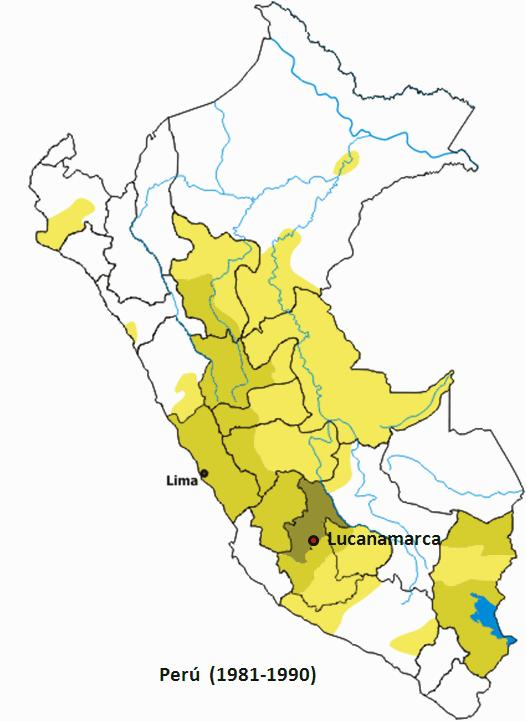
- Location of Lucanamarca in Peru, with areas of Shining Path influence in yellow
- Location: Lucanamarca, Peru
- Date: 3 April 1983; 43 years ago
- Target: Ronderos
- Attack type: Shooting, massacre, war crime
- Weapons: Axes, machetes, firearms
- Deaths: 69
- Perpetrator: Shining Path
- Motive: Terrorism; Retaliation for murder of Olegario Curitomay

On 3 April 1983, Shining Path rebels killed 69 people in and around the town of Lucanamarca in the Department of Ayacucho, Peru. Shining Path carried out the massacre in reprisal for the killing of its local commander by villagers earlier in the year.

== Background ==
On 17 May, 1980, the Maoist revolutionary group Shining Path began an insurgency against the Peruvian state. The group was based in the Ayacucho Region and had seized the town of Lunamarca. In March 1983, the local ronderos vigilantes captured Olegario Curitomay, a Shining Path commander in Lucanamarca, a small town in the Huanca Sancos Province of Ayacucho. Curitomay was taken to the town square, stoned, stabbed, set on fire, and finally shot.

== Attack ==
On 3 April 1983, Shining Path militants responded to the death of Olegario Curitomay by entering Lucanamarca and the villages of Yanaccollpa, Ataccara, Llacchua, and Muylacruz, and indiscriminately killing 69 Indigenous people in a revenge attack. Of those killed by the Shining Path, eighteen were children, the youngest of whom was only six months old. Also killed were eleven women. Eight of the victims were between fifty and seventy years old. Most of the victims died by machete and axe hacks, and some were shot in the head at close range.

== Aftermath ==
This was the first massacre committed by the Shining Path against members of a peasant community. At the party's Third National Conference in July 1983, Abimael Guzmán (Shining Path's leader) criticized the massacre as a strategic mistake: “What happened in Lucanamarca should never happen again...That is an expression of bad politics — that’s not how to behave...It’s erroneous to apply this line of attack because it can generate grave political consequences...Excesses can be accepted, but extremism never." Publicly, Guzmán later justified the massacre, telling El Diario (a pro-Shining Path newspaper based in Lima) in 1988 that it had shown Shining Path would be "a tough bone to gnaw."

Ultimately, the Shining Path's insurgency against the Peruvian state faltered, and Guzmán and several other high-ranking Shining Path members were captured in Lima in 1992. On 10 September 2002, Guzmán told the Truth and Reconciliation Commission "We, doctors, reiterate that we will not avoid our responsibility [for the Lucanamarca massacre]. I have mine, I'm the first one responsible, and I will never renounce my responsibility, that wouldn't make any sense."

== See also ==
- List of massacres in Peru
- Communist terrorism
- Red terror
