= Pukara, Víctor Fajardo =

Archaeological site in Peru

Pukara
- Interactive map of Pukara
- 13°38′45″S 74°22′50″W
- Location: Peru, Ayacucho Region
- Region: Andes

Site notes
- Height: 3,860 metres (12,664 ft)

Pukara (Quechua for fortress) is an archaeological site in the Ayacucho Region in Peru. It is located in Sarhua District, Víctor Fajardo Province. The site lies on the bank of the Lucanamarca River, west of Qaracha River, spread over three mountain tops at an altitude of 3,860 metres (12,664 ft) .
