= Sacsamarca District =

Coordinates: 13.9429°S 74.3126°W

Sacsamarca Saqsa Marka
- District
- Interactive map of Sacsamarca
- Country: Peru
- Region: Ayacucho
- Province: Huanca Sancos
- Founded: November 11, 1961
- Capital: Sacsamarca

Government
  - Mayor: Edgar Raul Olivares Yanqui

Area
  - Total: 673.03 km^{2} (259.86 sq mi)
- Elevation: 3,470 m (11,380 ft)

Population (2005 census)
  - Total: 2,118
  - Density: 3.147/km^{2} (8.151/sq mi)
- Time zone: UTC-5 (PET)
- UBIGEO: 050303

Sacsamarca District is one of four districts of the Huanca Sancos Province in Peru.

== Geography ==
One of the highest peaks of the district is Wank'a Saywa at approximately 4,600 m (15,100 ft). Other mountains are listed below:

- Apachita
- Aqchiq Wachana
- Aqu Q'asa
- Atuq Wachanan
- Hatun Ranra
- Hatun Wasi Pata
- Inti Watana
- Kampanachayuq
- Killa Q'asa
- Kinwa Pukyu
- Kinwa Urqu
- Kuntur Wasi
- Llut'u Pukyu
- Pallqacha
- Parqa Parqa
- Pichqa Pukyu
- Puma Ranra
- Qaqa Wasi
- Quncha Urqu
- Q'illu Q'asa
- Q'ipinayuq
- Saywa Marka
- Sullka Willka
- Sumaq Ñan
- Titanka
- Thujsa
- Urqu Wasi
- Urqun Qucha
- Wachu Wasi
- Wamanilla
- Wanakawri
- Wank'a Kancha
- Wank'a Saywa
- Waqutu
- Waylla Q'asa
- Yana Saywa

== Ethnic groups ==
The people in the district are mainly indigenous citizens of Quechua descent. Quechua is the language which the majority of the population (94.24%) learnt to speak in childhood, 5.47% of the residents started speaking using the Spanish language (2007 Peru Census).

== See also ==
- Kinwaqucha
- Q'illumayu
- Wamanilla
