= Carapo District =

Coordinates: 13.8371°S 74.3157°W

Carapo
- District
- Interactive map of Carapo
- Country: Peru
- Region: Ayacucho
- Province: Huanca Sancos
- Founded: January 2, 1857
- Capital: Carapo

Government
  - Mayor: Abraham Quispe León

Area
  - Total: 241.34 km^{2} (93.18 sq mi)
- Elevation: 3,188 m (10,459 ft)

Population (2005 census)
  - Total: 2,548
  - Density: 10.56/km^{2} (27.34/sq mi)
- Time zone: UTC-5 (PET)
- UBIGEO: 050302

Carapo District is one of four districts of the Huanca Sancos Province in Peru.

== Geography ==
One of the highest peaks of the district is Wayta Wayta at 4,800 m (15,700 ft). Other mountains are listed below:

- Misa Rumi
- Parya Muqu
- Pincha Urqu
- Qala Qala
- Urqu Pata

== Ethnic groups ==
The people in the district are mainly indigenous citizens of Quechua descent. 84.37% of the population speak Quechua as a first language, while the remaining 15.46% are first language Spanish speakers, according to the 2007 Peru Census.

== See also ==
- Ñawpallaqta
- Q'illumayu
