= Llallawi (Ayacucho) =

Mountain in Peru

- Location within Peru

Highest point
- Elevation: 4,600 m (15,100 ft)
- Coordinates: 13°39′09″S 74°28′59″W

Geography
- Location: Peru, Ayacucho Region
- Parent range: Andes

Llallawi (Quechua for a very big potato of singular appearance which used to be elected as a sacrificial offering for divinities, Hispanicized spelling Llallahui) is a mountain in the Andes of Peru, about 4,600 metres (15,092 ft) high. It is situated in the Ayacucho Region, Víctor Fajardo Province, on the border of the districts of Sarhua and Vilcanchos.
