= Huaya District =

Coordinates: 13.8479°S 73.9509°W

Huaya
- District
- Interactive map of Huaya
- Country: Peru
- Region: Ayacucho
- Province: Víctor Fajardo
- Capital: San Pedro de Huaya

Government
  - Mayor: Edgar Ipurre Uscata

Area
  - Total: 162.23 km^{2} (62.64 sq mi)
- Elevation: 3,341 m (10,961 ft)

Population (2005 census)
  - Total: 2,526
  - Density: 15.57/km^{2} (40.33/sq mi)
- Time zone: UTC-5 (PET)
- UBIGEO: 051010

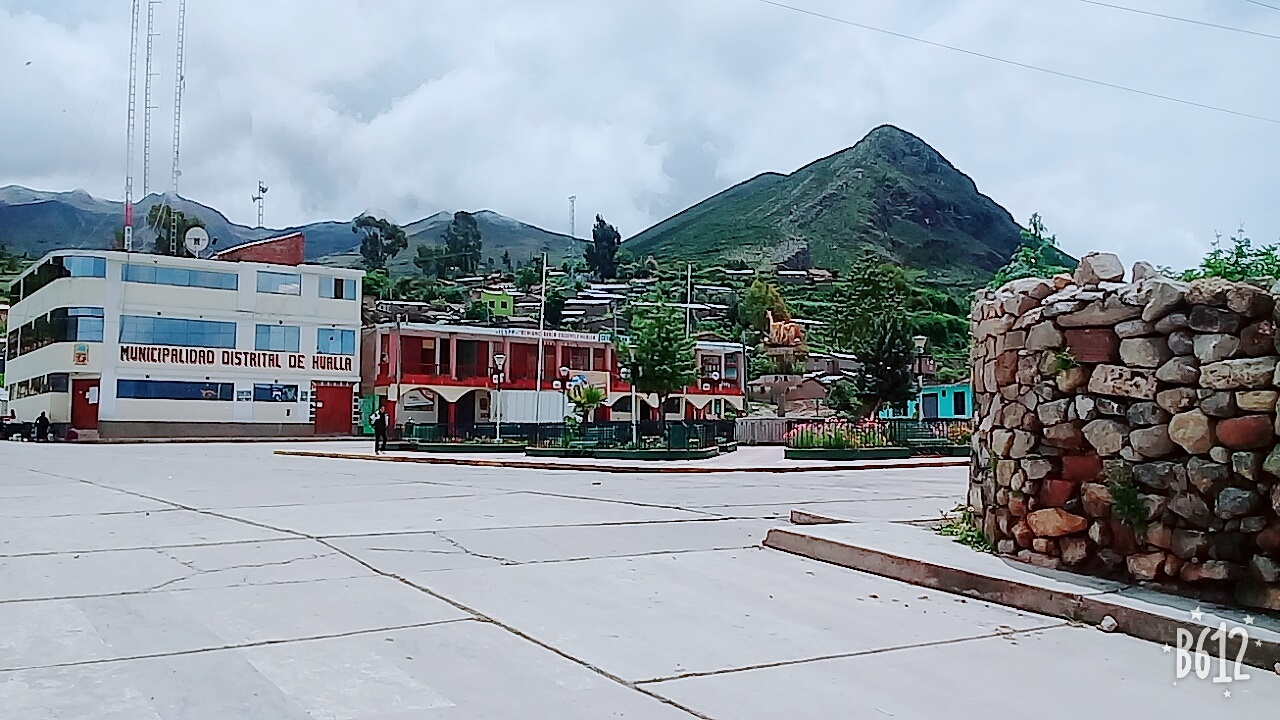

Huaya District is one of twelve districts of the province Víctor Fajardo in Peru.

== Ethnic groups ==
The people in the district are mainly indigenous citizens of Quechua descent. Quechua is the language which the majority of the population (90.38%) learnt to speak in childhood, 9.35% of the residents started speaking using the Spanish language (2007 Peru Census).

== See also ==
- Kinwamayu
