= Cayara massacre =

On May 14, 1988, the Peruvian military killed 39 peasants in the district of Cayara, Ayacucho. The massacre was carried out in retaliation for a Shining Path ambush that killed four soldiers.

Troops removed and incinerated the bodies of the victims in order to cover up the massacre. Several witnesses, including Cayara's mayor, were later 'disappeared'.

The government of Alan García initially denied that any massacre had taken place, citing the absence of bodies.

In 2023, 18 soldiers who took part in the killings were sentenced to jail terms of eight to 15 years.
