= Millka =

Peru archaeological site

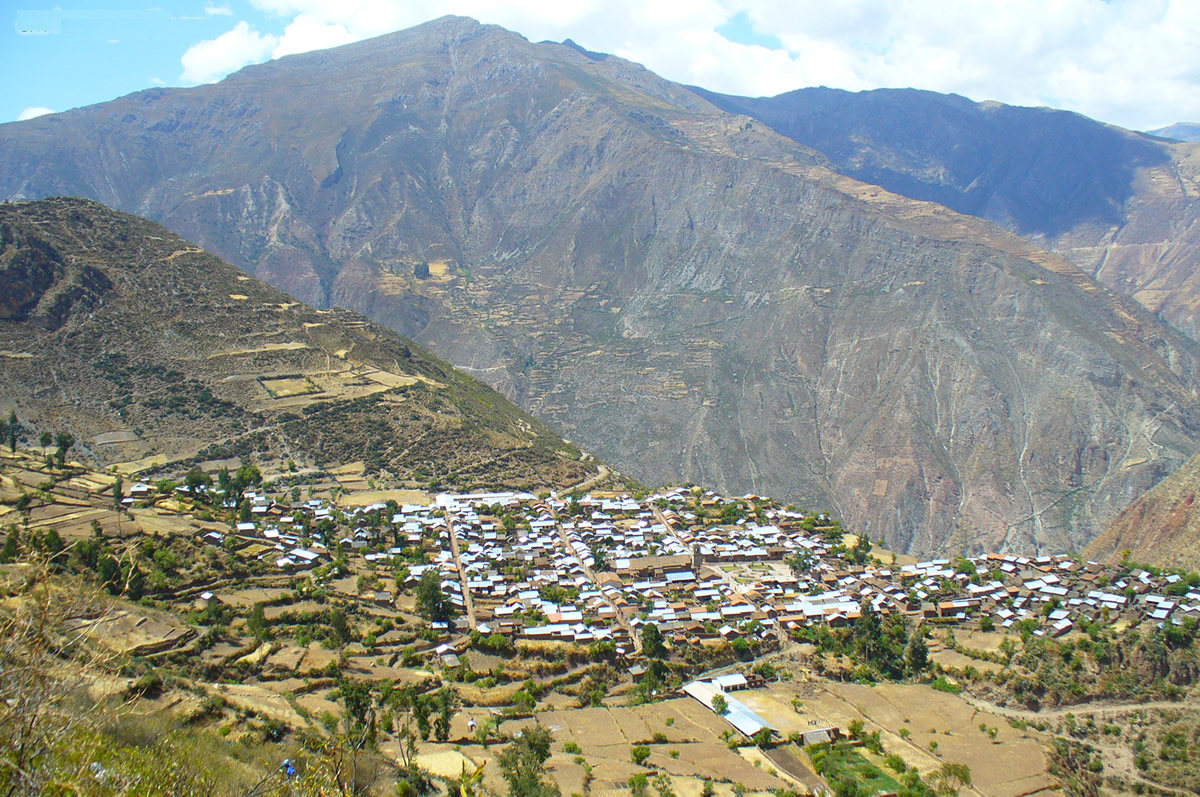
- The archaeological site of Millka lies on top of the mountain northeast of Sarhua (on the left)
- Interactive map of Millka
- 13°40′09″S 74°18′54″W
- Cultures: Chanka
- Location: Peru, Ayacucho Region
- Region: Andes

Site notes
- Height: 3,500 m (11,483 ft)

Millka (Aymara for divisions with lines within a sown field, Quechua for the space between two furrows or boundaries, also spelled Millqa) is an archaeological site in Peru. It is located in the Ayacucho Region, Víctor Fajardo Province, Sarhua District, northeast of Sarhua. The site of the Chanka period lies on top of a mountain at 3,500 m (11,483 ft).
