= Colca District, Victor Fajardo =

Coordinates: 13.7138°S 74.0416°W

Colca Qullqa
- District
- Interactive map of Colca
- Country: Peru
- Region: Ayacucho
- Province: Víctor Fajardo
- Founded: January 2, 1857
- Capital: Colca

Area
  - Total: 69.57 km^{2} (26.86 sq mi)
- Elevation: 2,972 m (9,751 ft)

Population (2005 census)
  - Total: 1,345
  - Density: 19.33/km^{2} (50.07/sq mi)
- Time zone: UTC-5 (PET)
- UBIGEO: 051007

Colca District is one of twelve districts of the province Víctor Fajardo in Peru.

== Ethnic groups ==
The people in the district are mainly indigenous citizens of Quechua descent. Quechua is the language which the majority of the population (83.11%) learnt to speak in childhood, 16.27% of the residents started speaking using the Spanish language (2007 Peru Census).
