= Quchayuq Urqu =

Mountain in Peru

- Location within Peru

Highest point
- Elevation: 4,400 m (14,400 ft)
- Coordinates: 13°43′08″S 74°28′06″W

Geography
- Location: Peru, Ayacucho Region
- Parent range: Andes

Quchayuq Urqu (Quechua qucha lake, -yuq a suffix to indicate ownership, urqu mountain, "the mountain with a lake (or lakes)", also spelled Ccochayocc Orcco) is a mountain in the Andes of Peru, about 4,400 metres (14,436 ft) high. It is situated in the Ayacucho Region, Víctor Fajardo Province, Sarhua District.
