= Kinwaqucha (Ayacucho) =

Lake in Peru

- Location within Peru
- Location: Peru; Ayacucho Region
- Coordinates: 13°56′S 74°09′W

Kinwaqucha (Quechua kinwa quinoa, qucha lake, "quinoa lake", also spelled Ccuenhua Cocha, Cuenhuacocha) is a lake in Peru located in the Ayacucho Region, Huanca Sancos Province, Sacsamarca District. Kinwaqucha lies northeast of the village of Kinwa Khuchu ("quinoa corner", also spelled Ccuenhuacucho), also named Kinwa Wayq'u ("quinoa stream", Cenhuahuaycco), and the small lake named Pukaqucha '("red lake", Pucacocha).

The Kinwa Wayq'u (Ccuenhuaycco) originates near the lake. Its waters flow to the Q'illumayu (Quechua for "yellow river").
