= Kunturillu (Ayacucho) =

Mountain in Peru

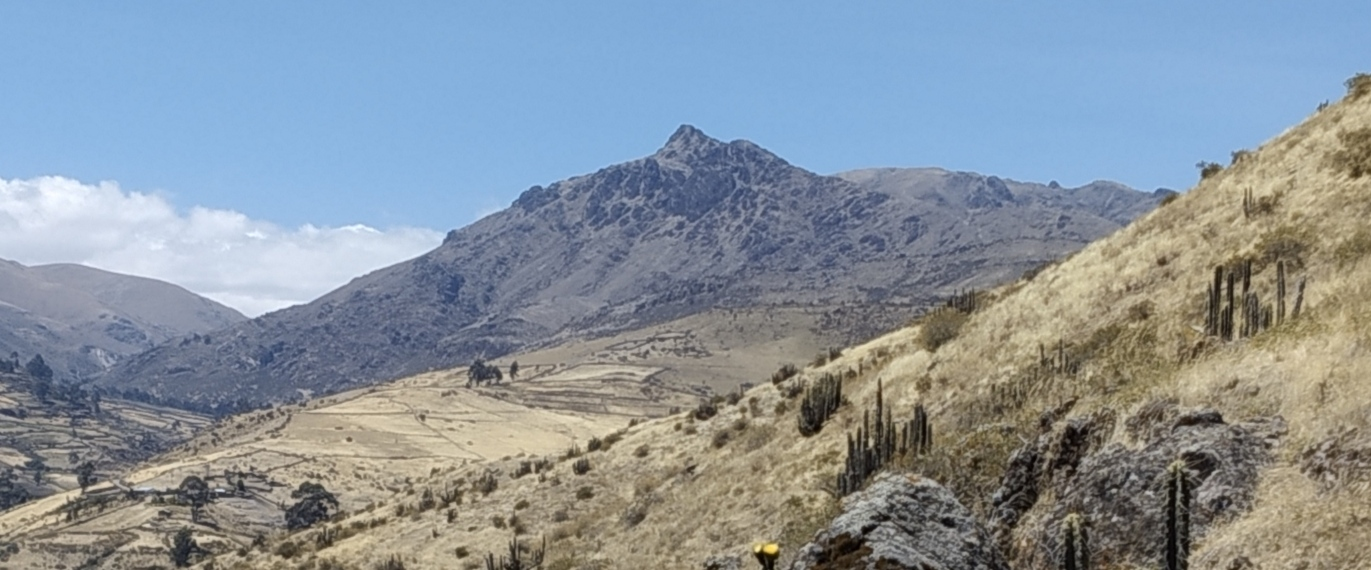

Highest point
- Elevation: 4,400 m (14,400 ft)
- Coordinates: 14°09′10″S 74°21′30″W

Geography
- Location within Peru
- Location: Peru, Ayacucho Region, Huanca Sancos Province
- Parent range: Andes

Kunturillu (Quechua for "black and white", Hispanicized spelling Condorillo) is a mountain in the Andes of Peru, about 4,400 metres (14,436 ft) high. It is situated in the Ayacucho Region, Huanca Sancos Province, Sancos District.
