= Huanca Sancos =

- Village
- Location within Peru
- Coordinates: 13°46′S 74°19′W
- Country: Peru
- Region: Ayacucho
- Province: Huanca Sancos
- District: Huanca Sancos

Government
  - Mayor: Cirilo Pacheco Vilchez

Huanca Sancos is a town in southern Peru, capital of the province Huanca Sancos in the region Ayacucho.
