= Q'illumayu =

Coordinates: 13.83251°S 74.3271°W

- Location within Peru
- Etymology: Quechua

Location
- Country: Peru
- Region: Ayacucho Region

Physical characteristics
- Mouth: Qaracha River

Q'illumayu (Quechua q'illu yellow, mayu river, "yellow river", hispanicized spelling Ccuellumayo) which upstream is called Churmi and Allawqa Wayq'u (Allauja Huayjo) is a river in Peru located in the Ayacucho Region, in the provinces Huanca Sancos and Victor Fajardo. It is an affluent of the Qaracha River which ends in the Pampas River.

Q'illumayu originates in or near the lake Wachuwaq'asa (Huacoajasa) which lies in the east of the Sacsamarca District. Its direction is mainly to the north and later to the northwest. The confluence with the Qaracha River is in the Carapo District, southeast of the lake Tiyu Qucha (Tiyo Ccocha).
