= Ñawpallaqta, Huanca Sancos =

Archaeological site in Peru

Ñawpallaqta
- Location: Peru, Ayacucho Region, Huanca Sancos Province
- Region: Andes

Ñawpallaqta or Ñawpa Llaqta (Quechua ñawpa ancient, llaqta place (village, town, city, country, nation), "ancient place", Hispanicized and mixed spellings Ñaupallacta, Ñaupallaqta) is an archaeological site in Peru. It lies in the Ayacucho Region, Huanca Sancos Province, Carapo District. The site was declared a National Cultural Heritage (Patrimonio Cultural) of Peru.
