= Ñawpallaqta, Fajardo =

Archaeological site in Peru

Ñawpallaqta
- Interactive map of Ñawpallaqta
- 13°47′10″S 74°01′45″W
- Location: Peru, Ayacucho Region, Víctor Fajardo Province
- Region: Andes

Site notes
- Height: 4,030 m (13,222 ft)

Ñawpallaqta or Ñawpa Llaqta (Quechua ñawpa ancient, llaqta place (village, town, city, country, nation), "ancient place", also spelled Nawpallacta) is an archaeological site in Peru. It lies in the Ayacucho Region, Víctor Fajardo Province, on the border of the districts of Cayara and Huancapi. It is situated near Anta Qaqa (Antaccacca) at a height of 4,030 m (13,222 ft) on the eastern side of the Kinwamayu valley.
