= Yana Kusma =

Mountain in Peru

Highest point
- Elevation: 4,540 m (14,900 ft)

Geography
- Location: Peru, Ayacucho Region, Huanca Sancos Province
- Parent range: Andes

Yana Kusma (Quechua yana black, kusma nightdress, shirt of a woman, "black nightdress" or "black shirt", Hispanicized spelling Yanacusma) is a mountain in the Andes of Peru, about 4,540 metres (14,895 ft) high. It is situated in the Ayacucho Region, Huanca Sancos Province, Sancos District.
