= Ampatuyoc (Ayacucho) =

Mountain in Peru

- Location within Peru

Highest point
- Elevation: 4,600 m (15,100 ft)
- Coordinates: 13°39′10″S 74°23′56″W

Geography
- Location: Peru, Ayacucho Region, Víctor Fajardo Province
- Parent range: Andes

Ampatuyoc (possibly from Quechua hamp'atu frog, -yuq a suffix to indicate ownership, "the one with a frog (or frogs)") is a mountain in the Andes of Peru, about 4,600 metres (15,092 ft) high. It is located in the Ayacucho Region, Víctor Fajardo Province, Sarhua District.
