= Huamanquiquia District =

Coordinates: 13.7287°S 74.2730°W

Huamanquiquia
- District
- Interactive map of Huamanquiquia
- Country: Peru
- Region: Ayacucho
- Province: Víctor Fajardo
- Founded: June 2, 1936
- Capital: Huamanquiquia

Government
  - Mayor: Cirilo Marino Aponte Enriquez

Area
  - Total: 67.33 km^{2} (26.00 sq mi)
- Elevation: 3,350 m (10,990 ft)

Population (2005 census)
  - Total: 1,324
  - Density: 19.66/km^{2} (50.93/sq mi)
- Time zone: UTC-5 (PET)
- UBIGEO: 051008

Huamanquiquia District is one of twelve districts of the province Víctor Fajardo in Peru.

== Ethnic groups ==
The people in the district are mainly indigenous citizens of Quechua descent. Quechua is the language which the majority of the population (93.43%) learnt to speak in childhood, 5.73% of the residents started speaking using the Spanish language (2007 Peru Census).

== See also ==
- Tawlli Urqu
