= Huancaraylla District =

Coordinates: 13.7207°S 74.1339°W

Huancaraylla
- District
- Interactive map of Huancaraylla
- Country: Peru
- Region: Ayacucho
- Province: Víctor Fajardo
- Founded: January 2, 1857
- Capital: Huancaraylla

Government
  - Mayor: Santos Quispe Nicodemos

Area
  - Total: 165.49 km^{2} (63.90 sq mi)
- Elevation: 3,230 m (10,600 ft)

Population (2005 census)
  - Total: 1,796
  - Density: 10.85/km^{2} (28.11/sq mi)
- Time zone: UTC-5 (PET)
- UBIGEO: 051009

Huancaraylla District is one of twelve districts of the Víctor Fajardo Province in Peru.

== Geography ==
One of the highest peaks of the district is Wayta Wayta at 4,600 m (15,100 ft). Other mountains are listed below:

- Aqu Q'asa
- Hatun Urqu
- Inti Watana
- K'ark'a Pata
- Llut'u Pukyu
- Punta Urqu
- Qichqa Urqu
- Saywa
- Wank'a Saywa
- Yana Pukyu
- Yuraq Urqu

== Ethnic groups ==
The people in the district are mainly indigenous citizens of Quechua descent. Quechua is the language which the majority of the population (92.34%) learnt to speak in childhood, 7.54% of the residents started speaking using the Spanish language (2007 Peru Census).

== See also ==
- Wamanilla
