= Víctor Fajardo province =

Coordinates: 13°41′S 74°04′W

Víctor Fajardo
- Province
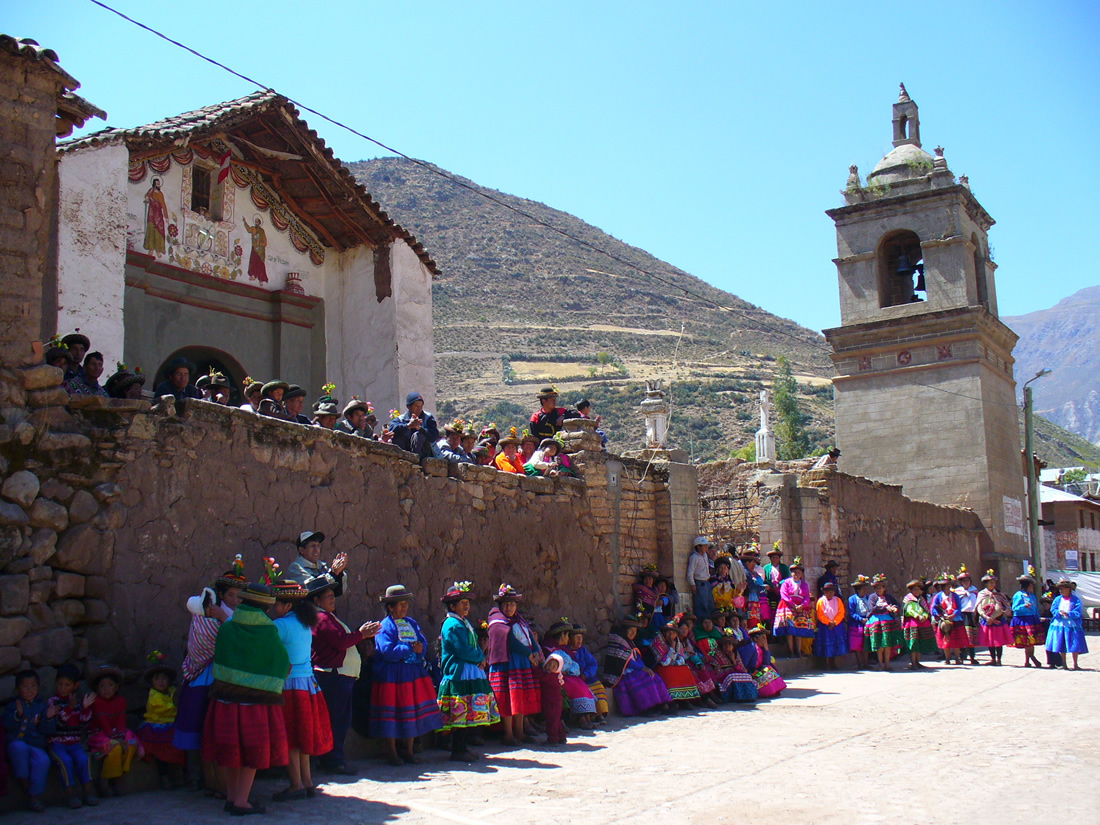
- The church of Sarhua

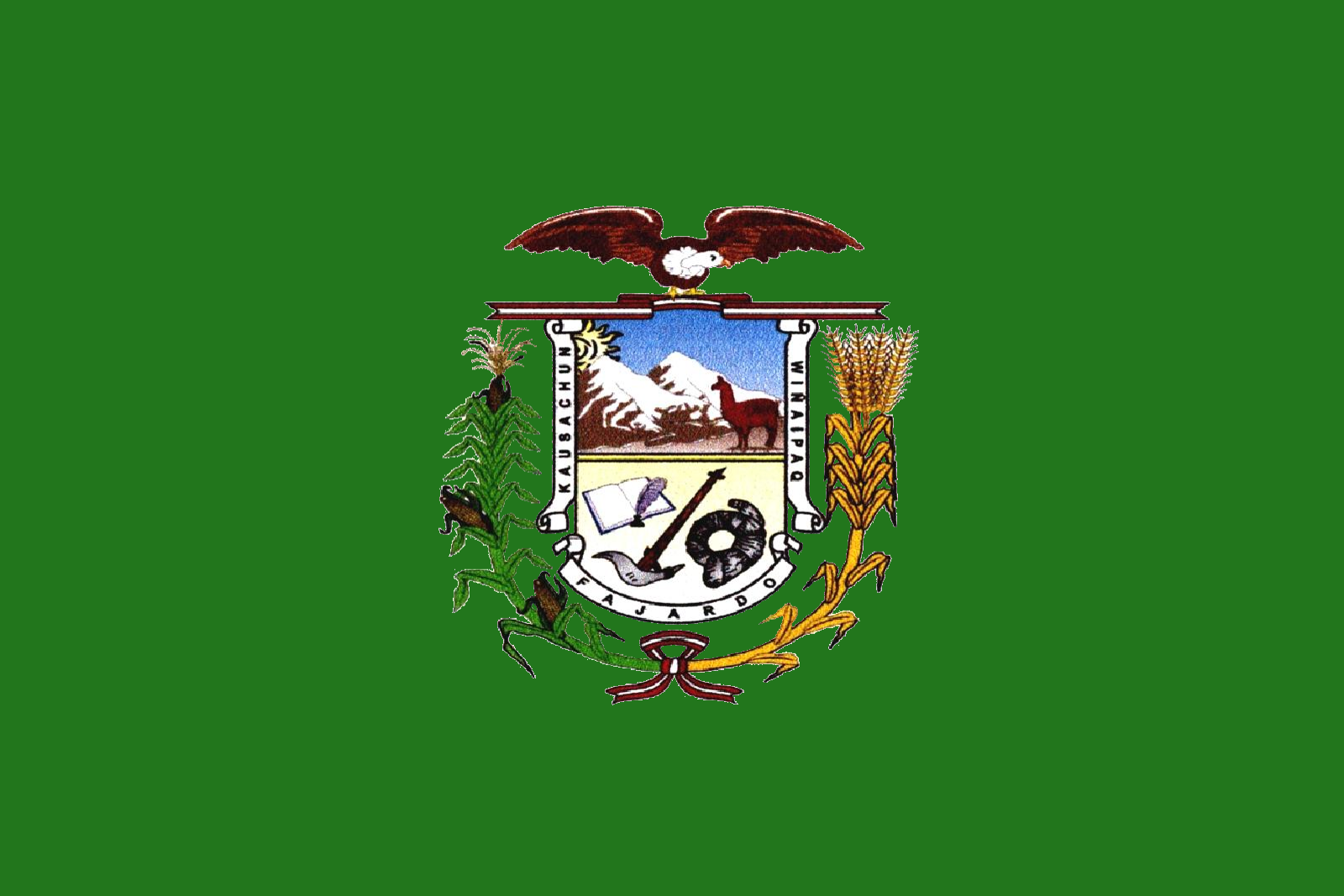
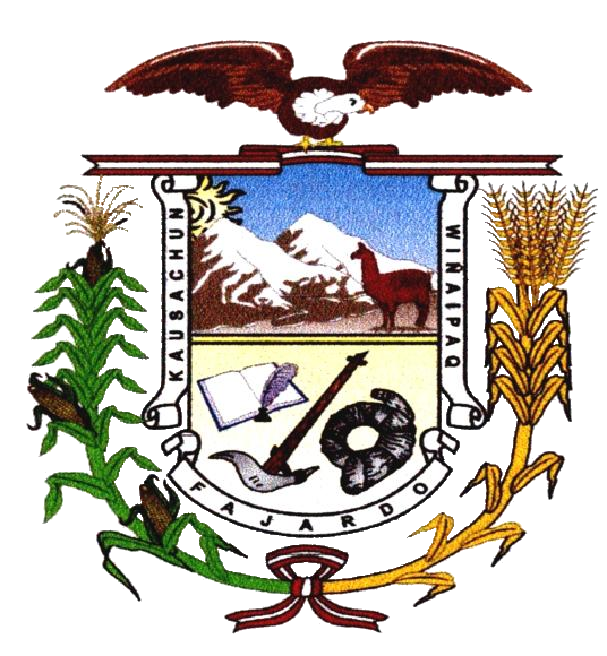
- Flag Coat of arms

- Location of Víctor Fajardo in the Ayacucho Region
- Country: Peru
- Region: Ayacucho
- Founded: November 14, 1910
- Capital: Huancapi

Government
  - Mayor: Onofrio Huamaní Garcia

Area
  - Total: 2,260.19 km^{2} (872.66 sq mi)

Population
  - Total: 27,919
  - Density: 12.353/km^{2} (31.993/sq mi)
- Website: www.munifajardo.gob.pe

Víctor Fajardo is a province in the centre of the Ayacucho Region in Peru.

== Boundaries ==
- North: province of Cangallo
- East: provinces of Vilcas Huamán and Sucre
- South: provinces of Lucanas and Huanca Sancos
- West: Huancavelica Region

== Geography ==
One of the highest mountains of the district is Hatun Urqu at approximately 4,600 m (15,100 ft). Other mountains are listed below:

- Allpa K'ark'a
- Ankap Wachanan
- Anta Q'asa
- Aqu Kunka
- Aqu Q'asa
- Chillwa
- Chunta
- Hamp'atuyuq
- Hatun Pampa
- Hatun Qaqa
- Huch'uy Pirwalla
- Illayuq
- Inti Watana
- Kuntur Qhata
- Kunturillu
- K'ark'a Pata
- Llallawi
- Llut'u Pukyu
- Millka
- Muyu Muyu
- Paqariq Qaqa
- Pata Kancha
- Puka Mach'ay
- Puma Ranra
- Punta Urqu
- Puywanniyuq
- Phiruru
- Qarwa Pata
- Qichqa Urqu
- Qucha Pata
- Qucha Qucha
- Qucha Urqu
- Quchayuq Urqu
- Qhata Pukyu
- Sayaq Mach'ay
- Saywa
- Sinqa
- Tawlli Urqu
- Tullpa Rumi
- Wanaku
- Wank'a Saywa
- Wanqani
- Waqra Chuku
- Yana Pukyu
- Yanaqucha
- Yuraq Urqu

== Political division ==
The province is divided into twelve districts (Spanish: distritos, singular: distrito), each of which is headed by a mayor (alcalde). The districts, with their capitals in parentheses, are:

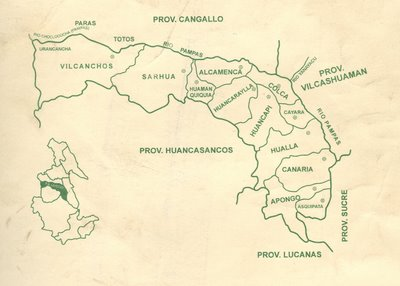
Districts in Fajardo Province

- Huancapi (Huancapi), Anexos:Ccocha y Pitahua
- Alcamenca, Anexos: Huambo, Carampa, Mirata, Unya, Eccallo, Patallacta e Irimpay
- Apongo, Anexos: Paire, Chillanccay y Huayccohuasi
- Asquipata, Anexos: Chihuire y Morcolla Chico
- Canaria, Anexos: Raccaya, Taca y Umasi
- Cayara, Anexos: Chincheros y Mayopampa
- Colca, Anexos: Quilla y San José de Sucre
- Huamanquiquia, Anexos: Patará, Tinca y Ucho
- Huancaraylla, Anexos: Circamarca y Llusita
- Huaya, Anexo: Tiquihua
- Sarhua (Sarhua), Anexos: Auquilla, Chuquihuarcaya y Tomanga
- Vilcanchos, Anexos: Cocas, Espite y Urancancha

== Ethnic groups ==
The people in the province are mainly indigenous citizens of Quechua descent. Quechua is the language which the majority of the population (86.22%) learnt to speak in childhood, 13.42% of the residents started speaking using the Spanish language (2007 Peru Census).

== See also ==
- Millka
- Ñawpallaqta
- Pukara
- Q'illumayu
- Wamanilla
- Willkamayu
