= Santiago de Lucanamarca District =

Santiago de Lucanamarca Lukana Marka
- District
- Location of Santiago de Lucanamarca in the Huanca Sancos Province
- Coordinates: 13°47′38″S 74°22′33″W
- Country: Peru
- Region: Ayacucho
- Province: Huanca Sancos
- Founded: January 29, 1965
- Capital: Santiago de Lucanamarca

Government
  - Mayor: Juan Quispe Huamanculi

Area
  - Total: 658.26 km^{2} (254.16 sq mi)
- Elevation: 3,489 m (11,447 ft)

Population (2005 census)
  - Total: 3,310
  - Density: 5.03/km^{2} (13.0/sq mi)
- Time zone: UTC-5 (PET)
- UBIGEO: 050304

Santiago de Lucanamarca District is one of four districts of the province Huanca Sancos in Peru.

== Geography ==
One of the highest peaks of the district is Parya at 4,862 m (15,951 ft). Other mountains are listed below:

- Allqa Wasi
- Ankapa Tiyanan
- Anta Sillu
- Aya Mach'ay
- Champiyuq
- Chawpi Urqu
- Chuqllu
- Ch'ulla Qiñwa
- Hamp'atuyuq
- Hatun Qiñwa
- Hatun Saywa
- Hatun Waraqu
- Illa Wasi
- Inti Watana
- Kuntur Qaqa
- Kuntur Wachanqa
- Millpuq Urqu
- Minasniyuq Urqu
- Pampa Mach'ay
- Paqu Urqu
- Pirwalla
- Puka Urqu
- Punta Rumi
- Qaqapa Wasi
- Qiwlla Qucha
- Saya Mach'ay
- Tipi Kancha
- Tunsu
- T'akra Pata
- Uqi Chaka
- Uqi Chaka Urqu
- Urqu Kancha
- Wansu
- Waraqu
- Waraquyuq
- Waylla Urqu
- Wayta Pata
- Wisk'acha Rumi
- Wisk'achayuq
- Yana Uqsha
- Yana Urqu
- Yana Waqra
- Yuraq Mach'ay
- Yuraq Urqu

The largest lake of the district is Qalla Qucha on the border with the Sancos District.

== Ethnic groups ==
The people in the district are mainly indigenous citizens of Quechua descent. Quechua is the language which the majority of the population (95.22%) learnt to speak in childhood, 4.38% of the residents started speaking using the Spanish language (2007 Peru Census).

== See also ==
- Lucanamarca massacre
