= Huanca Sancos province =

Coordinates: 13°55′07″S 74°19′55″W

Huanca Sancos
- Province
- Location of Huanca Sancos in the Ayacucho Region
- Country: Peru
- Region: Ayacucho
- Capital: Huanca Sancos

Government
  - Mayor: Cirilo Pacheco Vilchez

Area
  - Total: 2,862.33 km^{2} (1,105.15 sq mi)
- Elevation: 3,408 m (11,181 ft)

Population
  - Total: 12,120
  - Density: 4.234/km^{2} (10.97/sq mi)
- UBIGEO: 0503

Huanca Sancos is a province in central Ayacucho, Peru. On April 3, 1983, Shining Path terrorists entered the town of Lucanamarca and killed 69 people.

== Geography ==
Some of the highest mountains of the province are listed below:

- Allqa Wasi
- Aqu Chupa
- Aqu Muqu
- Aqu Q'asa
- Atuq Wachanan
- Aya Mach'ay
- Challwana
- Chawpi Urqu
- Chuqllu
- Chuntani
- Chupa Urqu
- Hatun Kinwa
- Hatun Pampa
- Hatun Ranra
- Hatun Saywa
- Hatun Waraqu
- Inka Wasi
- Inti Watana
- Killa Q'asa
- Kiswar
- Kuntur Qaqa
- Kuntur Sinqa
- Kuntur Wasi
- Kunturillu
- K'ichki Qaqa
- Lluqsiyuq
- Machu
- Millpuq
- Millpuq Urqu
- Minasniyuq Urqu
- Misa Rumi
- Ninalla Urqu
- Pampa Mach'ay
- Parya
- Pata Wasi
- Pichu Q'asa
- Pirwalla
- Puka Kancha
- Puka P'unqu
- Puka Qaqa
- Puka Saywa
- Puka Urqu
- Puma Ranra
- Puywanniyuq
- Phiruru
- P'isqu Pallana
- P'ukru Wasi
- Qaqa Wasi
- Qillqalla Q'asa
- Qiwllaqucha
- Qiwllari
- Qucha Wasi
- Qullpa
- Q'asa Wasi
- Q'illu Q'asa
- Q'illu Urqu
- Q'iru Chuku
- Titanka
- Titankayuq
- Urqu Pata
- Urqunqucha
- Usnu
- Wachu Wasi
- Wank'a Saywa
- Wansu
- Waraqu
- Waylla Q'asa
- Waylla Urqu
- Wayra Pata
- Wayta Wayta
- Waytaqucha
- Wichinka Pata
- Wisk'acha Rumi
- Wisk'achayuq
- Yana Kusma
- Yana Q'asa
- Yana Uqsha
- Yana Urqu
- Yanawaqra
- Yuraq Mach'ay
- Yuraq Urqu

== Political division ==
The province extends over an area of 2,862.33 square kilometres (1,105.15 sq mi) and is divided into four districts.

- Sancos (Huanca Sancos)
- Carapo (Carapo)
- Sacsamarca (Sacsamarca)
- Santiago de Lucanamarca (Lucanamarca)

== Ethnic groups ==
The people in the province are mainly indigenous citizens of Quechua descent. Quechua is the language which the majority of the population (80.79%) learnt to speak in childhood, while 18.72% of the residents started speaking using the Spanish language (2007 Peru Census).

== See also ==
- Kinwaqucha
- Ñawpallaqta
- Q'illumayu
- Wamanilla
