= Puyusca District =

Coordinates: 14°41′38″S 74°07′27″W

Puyusca Phuyusqa
- District
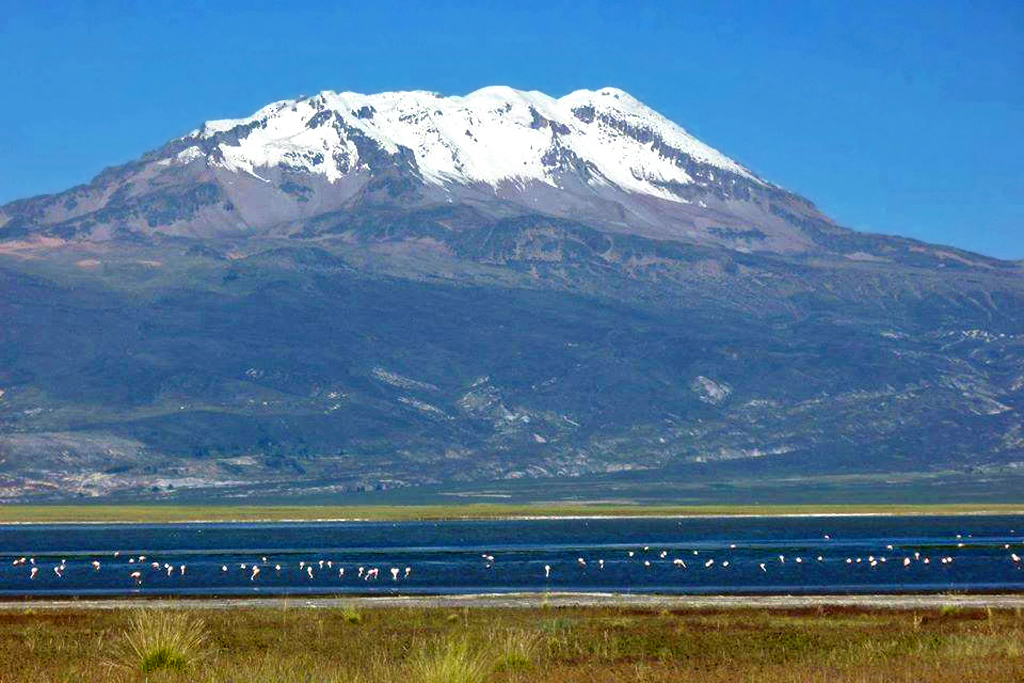
- Sara Sara, the highest mountain of the district, as seen from Parinaqucha
- Interactive map of Puyusca
- Country: Peru
- Region: Ayacucho
- Province: Parinacochas
- Founded: March 5, 1954
- Capital: Incuyo

Government
  - Mayor: Yony Odon Reyes Anampa

Area
  - Total: 700.75 km^{2} (270.56 sq mi)
- Elevation: 3,290 m (10,790 ft)

Population (2005 census)
  - Total: 3,055
  - Density: 4.360/km^{2} (11.29/sq mi)
- Time zone: UTC-5 (PET)
- UBIGEO: 050706

Puyusca (Quechua: Phuyusqa, meaning "cloudy") is one of eight districts of the Parinacochas Province in Peru.

== Geography ==
One of the highest elevations of the district is glacier-covered Sara Sara volcano at 5,505 m (18,061 ft). Other mountains are listed below:

- Hatun Urqu
- Kuntur Sirk'a
- Pichqa
- Pisti
- Puka Puka
- Phuyusqa
- Qiñwa Punta
- Ruphaylla
- Sara Qutuna
- Saywa Pampa
- Uywa Qhawarina
- Wamantirka

== Ethnic groups ==
The people in the district are mainly indigenous citizens of Quechua descent. Quechua is the language which the majority of the population (62.54%) learnt to speak in childhood, 36.97% of the residents started speaking using the Spanish language (2007 Peru Census).

== See also ==
- Parinaqucha
