= Sara Sara District =

Coordinates: 15.2449°S 73.4553°W

Sara Sara
- District
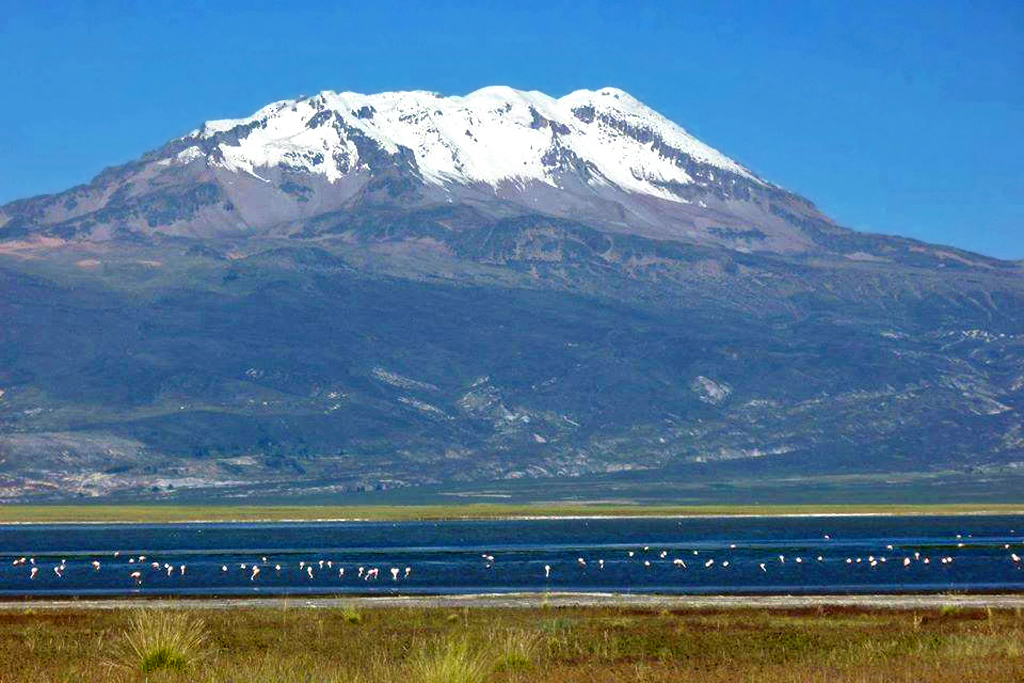
- Sara Sara, the highest mountain of the district
- Interactive map of Sara Sara
- Country: Peru
- Region: Ayacucho
- Province: Paucar del Sara Sara
- Founded: January 2, 1985
- Capital: Quilcata

Government
  - Mayor: Pedro José Rivera Vizcardo

Area
  - Total: 79.58 km^{2} (30.73 sq mi)
- Elevation: 3,300 m (10,800 ft)

Population (2005 census)
  - Total: 791
  - Density: 9.94/km^{2} (25.7/sq mi)
- Time zone: UTC-5 (PET)
- UBIGEO: 050810

Sara Sara District is one of ten districts of the province Paucar del Sara Sara in Peru.

== Ethnic groups ==
The people in the district are mainly indigenous citizens of Quechua descent. Quechua is the language which the majority of the population (55.66%) learnt to speak in childhood, 43.95% of the residents started speaking using the Spanish language (2007 Peru Census).

== See also ==
- Parinaqucha
- Sara Sara
