= Antonia Luzmila Rivas López =

Peruvian religious sister and Blessed

Blessed Antonia Luzmila Rivas López RGS

Martyr
- Born: 13 June 1920; Coracora, Parinacochas, Ayacucho, Peru
- Died: 27 September 1990 (aged 70); La Florida, Chanchamayo, Junín, Peru
- Venerated in: Roman Catholic Church
- Beatified: 7 May 2022, La Florida, Peru by Cardinal Baltazar Enrique Porras Cardozo (on behalf of Pope Francis)
- Feast: 26 September

Antonia Luzmila Rivas "Aguchita" López, RGS (María Agustina in religion; 13 June 1920 – 27 September 1990) was a Peruvian Catholic religious sister of the Congregation of Our Lady of Charity of the Good Shepherd.

Rivas studied in Lima before she became a religious sister. She made her perpetual vows in the late 1940s before she served as an educator for children. But she also had an active role in the care and education for indigenous populations and peasant women while she oversaw a number of different health and catechetical programs.

Rivas worked at a time when the communist-oriented Shining Path terrorist group was on the rise and threatened local relislain communities. She was slain in 1990 when a teenage girl from the Shining Path shot her dead with a rifle when she tried to intercede for the villagers that she was with at the time; her death rattled her order, which pondered whether to leave the area.

The process for Rivas' beatification was initiated in Peru in 2017 and she became titled as a Servant of God at the outset. Pope Francis determined in 2021 that Rivas had been slain "in odium fidei" (in hatred of the faith) hence permitted for her to be beatified; the beatification was celebrated in La Florida, Peru, on 7 May 2022.

== Life ==
Antonia Luzmila Rivas López was born on 13 June 1920 in Coracora in the Parinacochas Province as the first of eleven children born to Damaso Rivas and Modesta López de Rivera. Her devout parents educated her and her siblings in their faith and from her childhood she developed a strong passion for nature with its abundance of plants and local farm animals. In her childhood she also helped her mother with her duties inside the house; her mother did her best to take her to Mass each morning despite the distance involved. Rivas and her siblings all attended catechetical instruction in their local parish while her brother César entered the priesthood and was ordained as a Redemptorist.

In 1934, she relocated to Lima where she studied at the Sevilla College under the direction of the Sisters of the Good Shepherd. It was there in 1938 (when she visited her brother for his ordination) that she first felt attracted to the consecrated life and in 1941 entered that same religious congregation. Rivas made her initial religious profession on 8 February 1945 before she made her perpetual profession on 8 February 1949. She took the religious name María Agustina, but the sisters nicknamed her as "Aguchita" which became her well-known name throughout her life. Her father had died while she was still in the novitiate and her mother died while she lived in Barrios Altos (from 1963 until 1967) in Lima. Rivas lived in Lima until 1988 and carried out various services such as that of a cook, cleaner for the convent, a nurse, and as an educator at the Nuestra Señora de la Caridad del Buen Pastor school. But she also tended to minors that were abandoned or who were from poorer families in addition to her duties as a collaborator to the novice mistress. It was around this time that she first recorded a dream that she had working in the jungle with peasants but was at first unsure of the meaning behind it. It was not until 1987 that her dream became true after she was sent to her next assignment where her order had been working for just over the last decade since 1976.

But the Maoist communist-oriented Shining Path started its terrorist activism in 1988 and she was sent to La Florida in the Junín area where her order ran a mission with the commitment to support peasant women and the local indigenous population. The area was among the most violent of Peruvian districts and contained the poorest of the poor which was often home to bloodshed and violent skirmishes between the Peruvian armed forces and the guerilla Shining Path. The order was attentive to the risks involved due to the Shining Path and confirmed its presence there with a slew of programs on health and education that also prioritized on catechesis and nutrition. Rivas dedicated herself to these initiatives and saw the assignment as a further chance to connect with the poor. In addition, she also organized soup kitchens and clubs for mothers where she would teach them various skills to earn a living for themselves. Rivas also worked from 1970 until 1975 as a nurse for the poor. But the increased violence in the surrounding areas saw her order reflect on whether or not it would be wise for them to continue to serve local communities there due to the anti-religious sentiment that the terrorists demonstrated. But the order decided to continue with their work and accept the risks involved and often said "leave the town or give your life for it".

Rivas was well aware of the risks to her person during this time but decided to remain close with the local population and the Asháninka tribe (a tribe that had almost been wiped out at the beginning of the twentieth century due to disease as a result of rubber exports destroying the ecosystem) and later wrote: "I was never a respecter of persons, I loved everyone. To love the poor is to love life. It is to love the God of life". But the Shining Path broke into La Florida on 27 September 1990 and ordered all its inhabitants to gather in the main square with their original intention being to capture or execute the village chief. The terrorists searched for the chief but took Rivas instead and killed her in front of them. The terrorists accused her for false charitable and educational programs that sought to divert the teenage population from the armed insurrection. But the terrorists left the corpses of the six slain alongside her in the square all night and in fear fled the area before the bodies were discovered the next morning and buried. Rivas was killed after a teenager, only aged seventeen, shot her with a rifle and fired seven shots into her. The police recovered her remains and were able to confirm the manner of her death for her order. The priest Alfonso Tapia later said in 2021 that "she interceded for them and then when they were about to kill her, she had her hands together, she wanted to kneel. Her hands and legs were shaking ... she fell to the ground and they shot her five times. When we performed the autopsy to exhume the body, I was truly shocked. Nearly thirty years later, the forensic expert removed the five bullets from her body". In the aftermath of her death, the congregation began to ponder if the rest of them were willing to follow in her footsteps, having been shocked and frightened at her murder.

== Beatification ==
The diocesan process to investigate her life and holiness opened in the San Ramón vicariate on 4 October 2017 and concluded a fortnight later on 18 October. Pope Francis signed a decree on 22 May 2021 that determined that Rivas had been killed in odium fidei ("in hatred of the faith") The beatification took place on 7 May 2022. The postulator for this cause is Waldery Hilgeman.

== See also ==
- Catholic Church in Peru
