= Kiswarniyuq (Ayacucho) =

Mountain in Peru

- Location within Peru

Highest point
- Elevation: 4,600 m (15,100 ft)
- Coordinates: 14°49′46″S 73°44′00″W

Geography
- Location: Peru, Ayacucho Region
- Parent range: Andes

Kiswarniyuq (Quechua kiswar a species of shrub or tree (Buddleja incana), -ni, -yuq suffixes, "the one with kiswar", Hispanicized spellings Quisuarnioc) is a mountain in the Andes of Peru, about 4,600 m (15,092 ft) high. It is situated in the Ayacucho Region, Parinacochas Province, Coracora District. Kiswarniyuq lies between Suparawra in the north and Pumawiri in the south.
