= Chilcas District =

Coordinates: 13.1715°S 73.9067°W

Chilcas
- District
- Interactive map of Chilcas
- Country: Peru
- Region: Ayacucho
- Province: La Mar
- Founded: October 17, 1893
- Capital: Chilcas

Government
  - Mayor: Leonidas Illisca Guillen

Area
  - Total: 149.63 km^{2} (57.77 sq mi)
- Elevation: 3,220 m (10,560 ft)

Population (2005 census)
  - Total: 2,303
  - Density: 15.39/km^{2} (39.86/sq mi)
- Time zone: UTC-5 (PET)
- UBIGEO: 050504

Chilcas District is one of eight districts of the province La Mar in Peru.

== Ethnic groups ==
The people in the district are mainly indigenous citizens of Quechua descent. Quechua is the language which the majority of the population (96.56%) learnt to speak in childhood, 3.16% of the residents started speaking using the Spanish language (2007 Peru Census).
