= Pausa (disambiguation) =

Pausa is, in linguistics, the end of a prosodic unit.

Pausa may also refer to:

- Rest (music)

== Places ==
- France
  - La Pausa, a villa in Roquebrune-Cap-Martin
- Germany
  - Pausa, Saxony
- Peru
  - Pausa, Peru
  - Pausa District
- Romania
  - Păuşa, a village in Nojorid Commune, Bihor County, Romania
  - Păuşa, a village in Românași Commune, Sălaj County, Romania
  - Păuşa, a village in the town of Călimăneşti, Vâlcea County, Romania
  - Păuşa River, a river in Romania

== Media ==
- Pausa Records, USA division of an Italian jazz recording company
- Pausa, a 1992 short film by director Alik Sakharov
- Pausa, a 2020 extended play by Ricky Martin

== See also ==
- Pausha, the Hindu month
- Pauza (disambiguation)
