= Tipiqucha (Ayacucho) =

Lake in Peru

- Location within Peru
- Location: Peru; Ayacucho Region
- Coordinates: 14°40′5.9″S 73°48′28.7″W
- Surface elevation: 4,466 m (14,652 ft)

Tipiqucha (Quechua tipi Pennisetum clandestinum (a grass species), tipiy to husk maize, to snap, to break, qucha lake, Hispanicized spelling Tipiccocha) is a lake in Peru located in the Ayacucho Region, Parinacochas Province, Coracora District. It is situated at a height of about 4,466 metres (14,652 ft). Tipiqucha lies between the lakes Islaqucha and Pukaqucha in the west and the lake Parququcha in the east, near the mountains Puka Punchu ("red poncho", Puca Punchu), Waman Pirqa ("falcon wall", Huaman Pirca) and Quriwiri ("gold lasso", Ccorihuiri).

== See also ==
- List of lakes in Peru
