= Q'illu Urqu =

Q'illu Urqu (Quechua q'illu yellow, urqu mountain, "yellow mountain", other spellings Ccellohorcco, Ccello Orcco, Jello Orjo, Khellu Orkho, Quello Orjo, Quellorjo, Quellu Orco, Jelloorcco, Jelloorco, Jelloorjo) may refer to:

- Q'illu Urqu (Apurímac-Arequipa), a mountain on the border of the Apurímac Region and the Arequipa Region, Peru
- Q'illu Urqu (Ayacucho), a mountain in the Lucanas Province and in the Parinacochas Province, Ayacucho Region, Peru
- Q'illu Urqu (Cusco), a mountain in the Cusco Region, Peru
- Q'illu Urqu (Huancavelica), a mountain in the Huancavelica Region, Peru
- Q'illu Urqu (Parinacochas), a mountain in the Parinacochas Province, Ayacucho Region, Peru
- Q'illu Urqu (Sud Lípez), a mountain in the Sud Lípez Province, Potosí Department, Bolivia
- Q'illu Urqu (Tomás Frías), a mountain in the Potosí mountain range in the Tomás Frías Province, Potosí Department, Bolivia
