= Suparawra =

Mountain in Peru

- Location within Peru

Highest point
- Elevation: 5,029 m (16,499 ft)
- Coordinates: 14°46′08″S 73°43′55″W

Geography
- Location: Peru, Ayacucho Region
- Parent range: Andes

Suparawra (the name of an apu, Hispanicized spelling Suparaura) is a 5,029-metre-high (16,499 ft) mountain in the Andes of Peru. It is situated in the Ayacucho Region, Parinacochas Province, on the border of the districts of Coracora and Upahuacho. Suparawra lies southwest of Q'illu Urqu.
