= Coracora =

Coracora Qura Qura
- Town
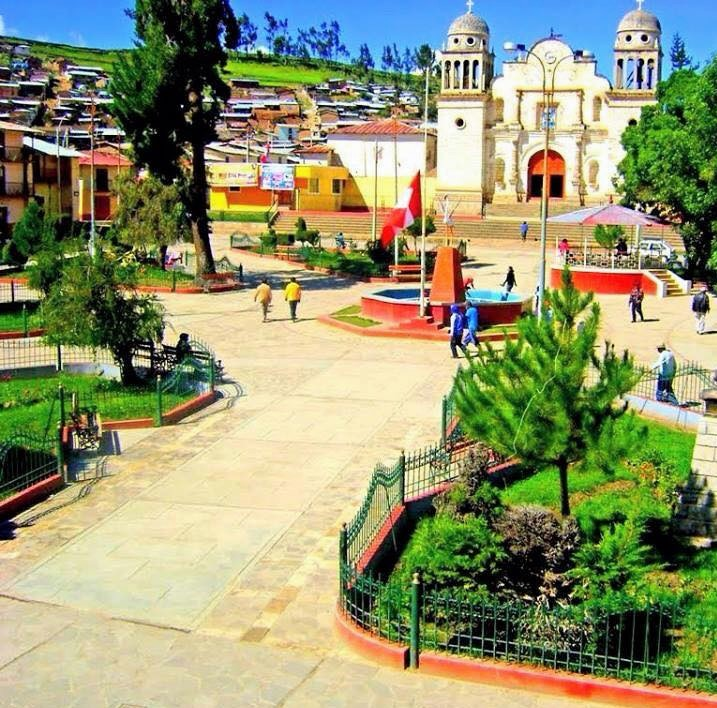
- Nickname: Coracora Tierra de Tradiciónes
- Location within Peru
- Coordinates: 15°01′01.18″S 73°46′49.51″W
- Country: Peru
- Region: Ayacucho
- Province: Parinacochas
- District: Coracora

Government
  - Mayor: Alfredo Lopez Gutierrez
- Elevation: 3,175 m (10,417 ft)
- Time zone: UTC-5 (PET)

Coracora or Qura Qura is a town in central Peru, and it is the capital of the Parinacochas Province in the Ayacucho Region. It has a population of approximately 13,000.

== Etymology ==
Coracora or Qura Qura comes from the Quechuan qura meaning herbaceous plant, the reduplication of the syllable indicates that there is a group or a complex of something, "a complex of herbaceous plants".

== Geography ==
Coracora is located 800 km from Lima, Peru at an altitude between 3,150 and 3,350 meters above sea level, known as the Quechua ecological region. The city of Coracora is the capital of the Parinacochas Province. It forms part of the department of Ayacucho and is located in the southwestern region of Peru. The districts that form the Parinacochas Province are: Coracora, Upahuacho, Pacapauza, Rivacayco, Chumpi, Incuyo, Pullo and Anizo.

=== Climate ===
The winter season between June and September has frequent frosts, and the temperate and very rainy summer falls between December and March.

Climate data for Coracora, elevation 3,149 m (10,331 ft), (1991–2020)
Month	Jan	Feb	Mar	Apr	May	Jun	Jul	Aug	Sep	Oct	Nov	Dec	Year
Mean daily maximum °C (°F)	18.2 (64.8)	17.6 (63.7)	17.6 (63.7)	18.6 (65.5)	18.9 (66.0)	18.9 (66.0)	18.7 (65.7)	19.3 (66.7)	19.9 (67.8)	20.0 (68.0)	19.8 (67.6)	19.3 (66.7)	18.9 (66.0)
Mean daily minimum °C (°F)	7.0 (44.6)	7.2 (45.0)	6.9 (44.4)	5.9 (42.6)	4.4 (39.9)	4.0 (39.2)	3.7 (38.7)	4.3 (39.7)	5.0 (41.0)	5.4 (41.7)	5.5 (41.9)	6.5 (43.7)	5.5 (41.9)
Average precipitation mm (inches)	111.5 (4.39)	136.6 (5.38)	94.4 (3.72)	24.3 (0.96)	1.4 (0.06)	0.4 (0.02)	2.0 (0.08)	2.0 (0.08)	3.4 (0.13)	5.0 (0.20)	6.6 (0.26)	28.7 (1.13)	416.3 (16.41)
Source: National Meteorology and Hydrology Service of Peru

== History ==
Founded by Spanish conquerors in the 17th century, Coracora developed on what was then the road between Lima and Cusco. Its old colonial buildings, such as the beautiful local church in the Baroque and styles were built of white ashlar.

During the 19th and 20th centuries Coracora became a flourishing Peruvian south mountain city thanks to cattle ranching.

Around the 1940s, Coracora reached an uncommon cultural and economic peak for a small city in mountainous Peru. This prosperity began to fluctuate in the 1980s due to the social violence of those years in Peru.

As of modern times, it has recovered its character as a ranching, commercial and tourist center, with significant improvements to roads, infrastructure, and services.

== Festivities ==
From August 1 to August 8, Coracora celebrates La Virgen de Las Nieves, known as "Virgin of the Snow".

August 1: People prepare for the festivities and cook food for the entire family.

August 2: People walk to Pumahuiri (the mountain where the Virgin of the Snow was found). They sing and dance as they walk. The songs are usually prayers.

August 3: It is the "Entrada de Negritos" (Entrance of the Blacks). Children walk into town singing and dancing and people follow them as they did on their way to Pumahuiri.

August 4: "Entrada de Chamiza" (Entrance of retama). The plants are brought in on donkeys and llamas. At night, people burn the dry plant and dance around the fires to the rhythm of live music that plays all night. The same night, they have Los Castillos, or fireworks on wood, in the main plaza, Plaza de Armas. They also have serenades with people dancing and singing.

August 5: It is the main day of the festivities. The townspeople walk around the main plaza where the church is located.

August 6 to August 8: The city goes to the bullring. Each family pays for its own place. Every square foot is worth $200.00. People buy bulls in honor of Our Lady of the Snows and the offering estimates the person (compadres). It is somewhat like a donation. If the bull does not die, the person who bought it and the person receiving it enter the bullring. People dressed in red lead a team of bulls.

Each year, a person must sign up to be in charge of the town festival on August 5.

== Virgen de Las Nieves ==
Spaniards were bringing a statue of the Virgin from Lima to Cuzco, but along the way, they stopped at Pumawiri. Pumahuiri was a long and very tiring mountain, so they stopped and rested. But one man dreamed of the Virgin of the Snow, who told him she wanted to stay in Coracora, not go to Cuzco. That town was Coracora. When the man awoke, he told his fellows about his dream. They believed what he had dreamed, so they went down the mountain and took the Virgin to Coracora.

== Notable people ==
- Abraham Falcon, luthier
- Luis Zacarías, football manager
