= Auquihuato =

Mountain in Peru

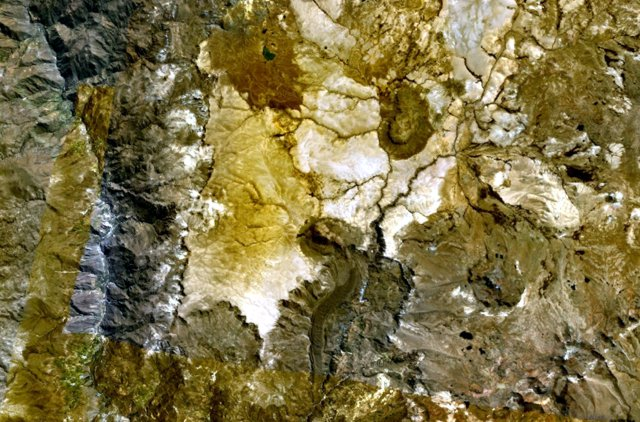
- The cinder cone at the margin of the light-colored plateau just below the center of this NASA Landsat image (with north to the top) is Auquihuato.

Highest point
- Elevation: 4,980 m (16,340 ft)
- Listing: Volcanoes of Peru
- Coordinates: 15°04′30″S 73°11′26″W

Geography
- Location within Peru
- Location: Ayacucho Region, Peru
- Parent range: Andes

Geology
- Mountain type: Cinder cone

Auquihuato (possibly from Quechua, awki: prince, watu: prediction, fortuneteller) is a cinder cone in the Andes of Peru, 4,980 metres (16,339 ft) high. It is situated in the Ayacucho Region, Paucar del Sara Sara Province, on the border of the districts Colta and Oyolo. Auquihuato lies northeast of Sara Sara volcano.

== Geology ==
=== Context ===
Auquihuato is surrounded by a Pliocene volcanic plateau, the cone formed on the plateau's southern margin. Sara Sara lies 30 kilometres (19 mi) southwest, and Firura lies 10 kilometres (6.2 mi) farther east. Auquihuato lies east of the main volcanic arc and is aligned with several other volcanic centres in a northwest-southeast line.

=== Volcano ===
Auquihuato is c. 400 metres (1,300 ft) high and a lava flow extends southward from the cone, reaching a length of 12 kilometres (7.5 mi). The lava flow has a pahoehoe texture and a thickness of 50 metres (160 ft). It has well developed levees.

== Activity ==
The stratovolcano developed during the Pleistocene and Holocene. The noticeable lava flow is of Holocene age but no radiometric dating is available and no historical eruptions are known. The Geophysical Institute of Peru began to monitor the geodesy of the system in 2019 and it is considered a low-hazard volcano.

Ground deformation has been observed by InSAR observation, centered 7 kilometres (4.3 mi) southeast of Auquihuato and with a circular shape. The ground deformation may be caused by changes in the pressure within the volcano's magma system, at depths probably exceeding 1 kilometre (0.62 mi), but an origin in a hydrothermal system is also possible. Volcano-tectonic earthquakes have been recorded.
