= Oyolo District =

Coordinates: 15.1792°S 73.1850°W

Oyolo
- District
- Interactive map of Oyolo
- Country: Peru
- Region: Ayacucho
- Province: Paucar del Sara Sara
- Capital: Oyolo

Government
  - Mayor: Felix Marcelino Canre Torres

Area
  - Total: 820.13 km^{2} (316.65 sq mi)
- Elevation: 3,400 m (11,200 ft)

Population (2005 census)
  - Total: 1,277
  - Density: 1.557/km^{2} (4.033/sq mi)
- Time zone: UTC-5 (PET)
- UBIGEO: 050806

Oyolo District is one of ten districts of the province Paucar del Sara Sara in Peru.

== Geographical Location ==
The Oyolo District is located in the Cordillera Volcánica in the northeast of the province of Páucar del Sara Sara. It has a length of almost 47 km in a SSW-NNE direction and a maximum width of almost 30 km. The district covers the upper catchment area of the Río Oyolo, which flows through the area in a south-southwesterly direction and later empties into the Río Huanca Huanca.

== Ethnic groups ==
The people in the district are mainly indigenous citizens of Quechua descent. Quechua is the language which the majority of the population (62.48%) learnt to speak in childhood, 36.69% of the residents started speaking using the Spanish language (2007 Peru Census).

== See also ==
- Awkiwatu
- Hatun Tipiqucha
- Huch'uy Tipiqucha
- Kunturqucha
- Puka Urqu
