= Q'illu Urqu (Parinacochas) =

Mountain in Peru

- Location within Peru

Highest point
- Elevation: 5,185 m (17,011 ft)
- Coordinates: 14°44′25″S 73°42′26″W

Geography
- Location: Peru, Ayacucho Region
- Parent range: Andes

Q'illu Urqu (Quechua q'illu yellow, urqu mountain, "yellow mountain", also spelled Ccellohorcco) is a 5,185-metre-high (17,011 ft) mountain in the Andes of Peru. It is situated in the Ayacucho Region, Parinacochas Province, on the border of the districts of Coracora and Upahuacho. Q'illu Urqu lies south of Parququcha.
