= La Mar province =

Coordinates: 13.012606°S 73.980964°W

La Mar
- Province
- Location of La Mar in the Ayacucho Region
- Country: Peru
- Region: Ayacucho
- Founded: March 30, 1861
- Capital: San Miguel

Government
  - Mayor: Eulogio Vila Montaño

Area
  - Total: 4,392.15 km^{2} (1,695.82 sq mi)
- Elevation: 2,661 m (8,730 ft)

Population
  - Total: 82,473
  - Density: 18.777/km^{2} (48.633/sq mi)
- UBIGEO: 0505
- Website: www.munilamar.gob.pe

La Mar is a province in the north-east corner of the Ayacucho Region, Peru. It was created on March 30, 1861.

== Geography ==
One of the highest mountains of the province is Rasuwillka at approximately 4,800 m (15,700 ft). Other mountains are listed below:

- Animasniyuq
- Apachita
- Aqu Kunka
- Chillwas
- Ch'illka
- Ch'illka Qucha
- Ch'uru Q'asa
- Hatun Parya Urqu
- Hatun Urqu
- Ichhu Pata
- Ichhu Rutuna
- Kallki Q'asa
- Kancha Kancha
- Kuntur Qaqa
- K'allapayuq Urqu
- Llaqta Urqu
- Muru Qucha
- Nina Q'iru Punta
- Nina Urqu
- Pallqa Urqu
- Pisqu Willka
- Pukar
- Phaqcha Wasi Kiska
- P'unqu
- P'unquyuq
- Qallpa Urqu
- Qarwa Pata
- Qucha Q'asa
- Qucha Urqu
- Rayu Q'asa
- Rumi Chaka
- Rumi Rumi
- Runa Wañusqa
- Salta Waylla
- Silla Q'asa
- Sinqan
- Waman Pirqa
- Wanu Pata
- Wayta Pallana
- Yana Rumi
- Yana Urqu
- Yana Willka

== Political division ==
The province is divided into ten districts (Spanish: distritos, singular: distrito), each of which is headed by a mayor (alcalde). The districts, with their capitals in parentheses, are:

- Anco (Chiquintirca)
- Ayna (San Francisco)
- Chilcas (Chilcas)
- Chungui (Chungui)
- Luis Carranza (Pampas)
- San Miguel (San Miguel)
- Santa Rosa (Santa Rosa)
- Samugari (Palmapampa)
- Tambo (Tambo)
- Anchihuay (Anchihuay)
- Oronccoy (Oronccoy)

== Ethnic groups ==
The people in the province are mainly indigenous citizens of Quechua descent. Quechua is the language which the majority of the population (82.96%) learnt to speak in childhood, 16.58% of the residents started speaking using the Spanish language (2007 Peru Census).

== Archaeology ==
Some of the most important archaeological sites of the province are K'allapayuq Urqu and Waraqu Urqu.
