= Incuyo =

Coordinates: 15.2485°S 74.1294°W

Incuyo is the main village in Parinacochas, which is located in South Ayacucho, Peru.

Incuyo is located on the plateau of Parinacochas between 3,500 and 4,000 meters. height above sea level. Its strategic location on the plateau has enabled maximize the arable fields nearby. The majestic Sarasara and lagoon Parinacochas Incuyo give that distinctive Andean landscape that locals and visitors will never get tired of looking. Parinacochas was considered by the Incas as the Andean flamingo lagoon (parihuana) and the second largest after Lake Titicaca. As it was described by Hiram Bingham III in his "Inca Land: Explorations of the highlands of Peru" published in 1912, in which he narrates his explorations in our vast topography. The Sarasara is the mountain that dominates the region with its snow cover on top. Sarasara was once much higher than it is but the ice and snow have been eroding and such movement of ice and snow increased the volume of water of the lagoon.
