= Pullo District =

Coordinates: 14°41′38″S 74°07′27″W

Pullo Pullu
- District
- Interactive map of Pullo
- Country: Peru
- Region: Ayacucho
- Province: Parinacochas
- Capital: Pullo

Government
  - Mayor: Erasmo Cesar Lopez Risther

Area
  - Total: 1,562.34 km^{2} (603.22 sq mi)
- Elevation: 3,030 m (9,940 ft)

Population (2005 census)
  - Total: 4,064
  - Density: 2.601/km^{2} (6.737/sq mi)
- Time zone: UTC-5 (PET)
- UBIGEO: 050705

Pullo District is one of eight districts of the province Parinacochas in Peru.

== Geography ==
One of the highest peaks of the district is Kuntur Umaña at approximately 4,200 m (13,800 ft). Other mountains are listed below:

- Hatun
- Hatun Q'asa
- Hatun Ranra
- Ichhu Urqu
- Lukmayuq
- Palta Rumi
- Pichqa Pukyu
- Pilluni
- Pallqa
- Qallu Qallu
- Qhispi Q'asa
- Q'asa
- Q'illu Urqu
- Sawsiyuq
- Saywa
- Saywayuq
- Tullpa Urqu
- T'astayuq
- Waña Quta
- Wanu Wasi
- Wayllayuq
- Wisk'achani
- Yana Ranra
- Yana Urqu
- Yuraq Urqu

== Ethnic groups ==
The people in the district are mainly indigenous citizens of Quechua descent. Quechua is the language which the majority of the population (54.56%) learnt to speak in childhood, 44.42% of the residents started speaking using the Spanish language (2007 Peru Census).

== See also ==
- Inka Wasi
