= Anco District, La Mar =

Coordinates: 13.1143°S 73.7313°W

Anco District
- District
- Interactive map of Anco District
- Country: Peru
- Region: Ayacucho
- Province: La Mar
- Capital: Chiquintirca

Government
  - Mayor: Wilder Manyavilca Silva

Area
  - Total: 1,098.2 km^{2} (424.0 sq mi)
- Elevation: 3,215 m (10,548 ft)

Population (2005 census)
  - Total: 14,551
  - Density: 13.250/km^{2} (34.317/sq mi)
- Time zone: UTC-5 (PET)
- UBIGEO: 050502

Anco District is one of eight districts of the province La Mar in Peru.

== Ethnic groups ==
The people in the district are mainly indigenous citizens of Quechua descent. Quechua is the language which the majority of the population (93.11%) learnt to speak in childhood, 6.44% of the residents started speaking using the Spanish language (2007 Peru Census).

== See also ==
- K'allapayuq Urqu
- Waraqu Urqu
