= San Javier de Alpabamba District =

Coordinates: 15.0582°S 73.3274°W

San Javier de Alpabamba Allpapampa
- District
- Interactive map of San Javier de Alpabamba
- Country: Peru
- Region: Ayacucho
- Province: Paucar del Sara Sara
- Founded: July 24, 1952
- Capital: San Javier de Alpabamba

Government
  - Mayor: Melecio Modesto Cruces Neyra

Area
  - Total: 92.87 km^{2} (35.86 sq mi)
- Elevation: 2,630 m (8,630 ft)

Population (2005 census)
  - Total: 348
  - Density: 3.75/km^{2} (9.71/sq mi)
- Time zone: UTC-5 (PET)
- UBIGEO: 050808

San Javier de Alpabamba District is one of ten districts of the province Paucar del Sara Sara in Peru.
