= Coracora District =

Coordinates: 14°41′38″S 74°07′27″W

Coracora Qura Qura or Qhura Qhura
- District
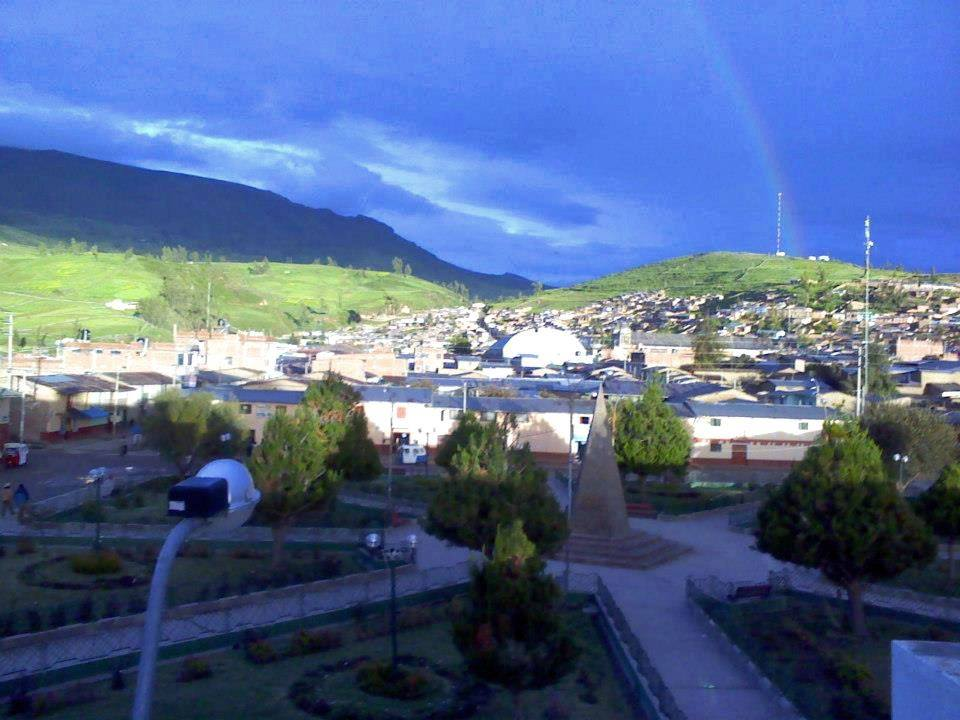
- City of Coracora
- Interactive map of Coracora
- Country: Peru
- Region: Ayacucho
- Province: Parinacochas
- Capital: Coracora

Government
  - Mayor: Walter Antayhua Cuadros

Area
  - Total: 1,399.41 km^{2} (540.32 sq mi)
- Elevation: 3,175 m (10,417 ft)

Population (2005 census)
  - Total: 13,714
  - Density: 9.7998/km^{2} (25.381/sq mi)
- Time zone: UTC-5 (PET)
- UBIGEO: 050701

Coracora District is one of eight districts of the Parinacochas Province in Peru.

== Geography ==
Some of the highest elevations of the district are Suparawra at 5,029 m (16,499 ft) and Q'illu Urqu at approximately 5,000 m (16,000 ft), both on the border with the Upahuacho District. Other mountains are listed below:

- Allqa Q'awa
- Aqchi Pata
- Aqu Sinqa
- Chawpi Urqu
- Chiri Sinqa
- Chuku Chuku
- Chunta
- Ch'api
- Kiswarniyuq
- Kuntur Qhata
- Maray Urquna
- Millu
- Pirwa
- Puka Pata
- Puka Punchu
- Puka Punta
- Puka Saywa
- Pukar
- Pumawiri
- Phiruru
- Qiñwa Urqu
- Qullqata
- Q'illu Q'asa
- Q'illu Urqu
- Qullpa Pampa
- Ranra K'uchu
- Ranrayuq
- Runtu
- Silla Q'asa
- Wachwani
- Waman Pirqa
- Wamanripa
- Waylla Wasi
- Yaritayuq
- Yuraq Phiruru

== History ==
For a detailed account of the history of this city (up to c. 1951), see 'La Monografia de la Provincia de Parinacochas'. The two-volume book covers historical and cultural information.

== Climate ==
Climate data for Coracora, elevation 3,149 m (10,331 ft), (1991–2020)
Month	Jan	Feb	Mar	Apr	May	Jun	Jul	Aug	Sep	Oct	Nov	Dec	Year
Mean daily maximum °C (°F)	18.2 (64.8)	17.6 (63.7)	17.6 (63.7)	18.6 (65.5)	18.9 (66.0)	18.9 (66.0)	18.7 (65.7)	19.3 (66.7)	19.9 (67.8)	20.0 (68.0)	19.8 (67.6)	19.3 (66.7)	18.9 (66.0)
Mean daily minimum °C (°F)	7.0 (44.6)	7.2 (45.0)	6.9 (44.4)	5.9 (42.6)	4.4 (39.9)	4.0 (39.2)	3.7 (38.7)	4.3 (39.7)	5.0 (41.0)	5.4 (41.7)	5.5 (41.9)	6.5 (43.7)	5.5 (41.9)
Average precipitation mm (inches)	111.5 (4.39)	136.6 (5.38)	94.4 (3.72)	24.3 (0.96)	1.4 (0.06)	0.4 (0.02)	2.0 (0.08)	2.0 (0.08)	3.4 (0.13)	5.0 (0.20)	6.6 (0.26)	28.7 (1.13)	416.3 (16.41)
Source: National Meteorology and Hydrology Service of Peru

== See also ==
- Parququcha
- Tipiqucha
