= Corculla District =

Coordinates: 15.2631°S 73.2001°W

Corculla
- District
- Interactive map of Corculla
- Country: Peru
- Region: Ayacucho
- Province: Paucar del Sara Sara
- Capital: Corculla

Government
  - Mayor: Lelis Decifredo Davalos Lopez

Area
  - Total: 97.05 km^{2} (37.47 sq mi)
- Elevation: 3,470 m (11,380 ft)

Population (2005 census)
  - Total: 555
  - Density: 5.72/km^{2} (14.8/sq mi)
- Time zone: UTC-5 (PET)
- UBIGEO: 050803

Corculla District is one of ten districts of the province Paucar del Sara Sara in Peru.
