= Pauza =

Pauza may refer to:

== People ==
- Kevin Pauza, American physiatrist
- Robert Pauza, American gunsmith, creator of the Pauza P-50

== Places ==
- Pauza (city), Peru; in the district of Pauza
- Pauza (district), Peru; capital: Pauza

== Other uses ==
- "Pauza" (song) (Bosnian: Pause), a 2016 song by Maya Berović
- Pauza P-50 rifle (1991-1997), developed by Robert Pauza, manufactured by Pauza Specialists
- Pauza Specialists, a firearms manufacturer, the maker of the Pauza P-50

== See also ==
- Pausa (disambiguation)
