= San Miguel District, La Mar =

Coordinates: 13.0136°S 73.9807°W

San Miguel
- District
- Interactive map of San Miguel
- Country: Peru
- Region: Ayacucho
- Province: La Mar
- Capital: San Miguel

Government
  - Mayor: Eulogio Vila Montaño

Area
  - Total: 902.98 km^{2} (348.64 sq mi)
- Elevation: 2,661 m (8,730 ft)

Population (2005 census)
  - Total: 19,185
  - Density: 21.246/km^{2} (55.028/sq mi)
- Time zone: UTC-5 (PET)
- UBIGEO: 050501

San Miguel District is one of eight districts of the province La Mar in Peru.

== Ethnic groups ==
The people in the district are mainly indigenous citizens of Quechua descent. Quechua is the language which the majority of the population (84.03%) learnt to speak in childhood, 15.64% of the residents started speaking using the Spanish language (2007 Peru Census).
