= Millo (disambiguation) =

Millo is a structure in Jerusalem. Millo may also refer to:

- Millo (Cusco), a mountain in Peru
- Antonio Millo (active 1557–1590), Greek cartographer
- Matei Millo (1813/4–1896), Romanian playwright and actor
- Enrico Millo (1865–1930), Italian admiral and politician
- Louis Millo (1902–1983), French cyclist
- Achille Millo (1922–2006), Italian actor and stage director
- Mario Millo (b. 1955), Australian musician and composer
- Aprile Millo (b. 1958), American opera singer
- Enric Millo (b. 1960), Spanish politician
- Lefter Millo (1966–1997), Albanian footballer

== See also ==
- Millu (disambiguation), of which "Millo" is a Hispanicized spelling
- Millonarios F.C., also called "Millos"
