= Colta District =

Coordinates: 15.1629°S 73.2973°W

Colta
- District
- Interactive map of Colta
- Country: Peru
- Region: Ayacucho
- Province: Paucar del Sara Sara
- Capital: Colta

Government
  - Mayor: Eulogio José Cayo Quispe

Area
  - Total: 277.29 km^{2} (107.06 sq mi)
- Elevation: 3,300 m (10,800 ft)

Population (2005 census)
  - Total: 587
  - Density: 2.12/km^{2} (5.48/sq mi)
- Time zone: UTC-5 (PET)

Colta District is one of ten districts of the province Paucar del Sara Sara in Peru.

== Ethnic groups ==
The people in the district are mainly indigenous citizens of Quechua descent. Quechua is the language which the majority of the population (72.20%) learnt to speak in childhood, 27.40% of the residents started speaking using the Spanish language (2007 Peru Census).

== See also ==
- Awkiwatu
