= Inka Wasi, Ayacucho =

Archaeological site in Peru

Coordinates: 15.2468°S 73.7449°W

Inka Wasi
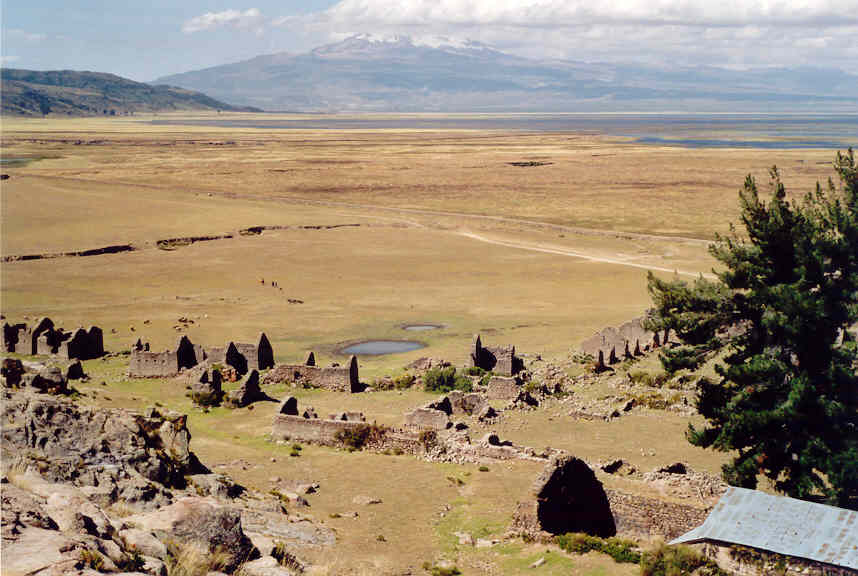
- The site Inkawasi with the volcano Sara Sara and the lake Parinaqucha in the background

- Location within Peru
- Cultures: Inca
- Location: Peru
- Region: Ayacucho Region

Inka Wasi or Inkawasi (Quechua inka Inca, wasi house, "Inca house", Hispanicized spelling Incahuasi) is an archaeological site in Peru. It is located in the Ayacucho Region, Parinacochas Province, Pullo District.

== See also ==
- Parinaqucha
- Sara Sara
