= Wachwani =

Mountain in Peru

- Location within Peru

Highest point
- Elevation: 4,600 m (15,100 ft)
- Coordinates: 14°54′56″S 73°40′50″W

Geography
- Location: Peru, Ayacucho Region
- Parent range: Andes

Wachwani (Quechua wachwa Andean goose, Aymara -ni a suffix to indicate ownership, "the one with the Andean goose", Hispanicized spelling Huachhuani) is a mountain in the Andes of Peru, about 4,600 m (15,092 ft) high. It is situated in the Ayacucho Region, Parinacochas Province, Coracora District.
