= Paucar del Sara Sara province =

Coordinates: 15°16′47″S 73°20′45″W

Paucar del Sara Sara
- Province
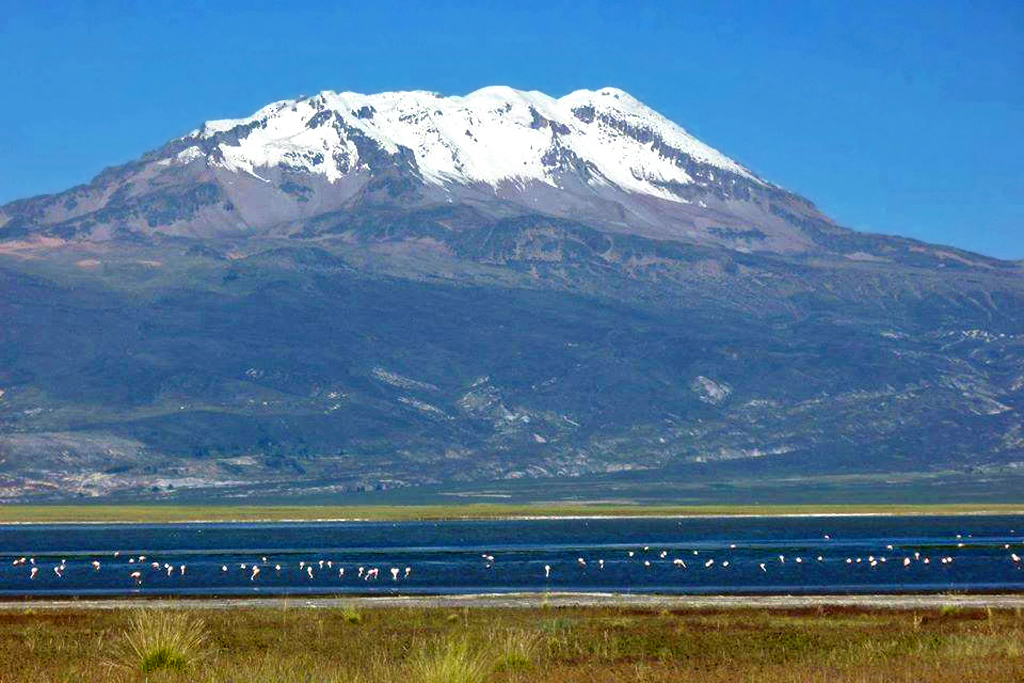
- Sara Sara, the highest mountain in the province

- Location of Paucar del Sara Sara in the Ayacucho Region
- Country: Peru
- Region: Ayacucho
- Capital: Pausa

Government
  - Mayor: José Felix Rosenthal Quispe

Area
  - Total: 2,096.92 km^{2} (809.63 sq mi)

Population
  - Total: 10,610
  - Density: 5.060/km^{2} (13.10/sq mi)
- UBIGEO: 0508

Paucar del Sara Sara is a province located in the south-eastern corner of the Ayacucho Region of Peru. It is one of eleven provinces that make up the region. The province reported a population of 10,610 inhabitants in the 2005 census. It is bounded to the north and west by the province of Parinacochas and to the south and east by the Arequipa Region. The capital of this province is the city of Pausa.

== Geography ==
The highest mountain in the province is Sara Sara at 5,505 m (18,061 ft) on the border with the province of Parinacochas. Other mountains are listed below:

- Aklla Wasi
- Ancha Qalla
- Anilluyuq
- Aqu
- Aqu Q'asa
- Awkiwatu
- Chulluni
- Chururu P'ukru
- Hatun Aqu
- Ichhu Pata
- Jamati Wañusqa
- Kisu Rumi
- Kuntur Sirka
- Lujmani
- Pampa Wasi
- Puka Puka
- Puka Q'asa
- Puka Urqu
- Puma Ranra
- Putaqa
- Qaqa Mach'ay
- Qarwayuq
- Qillqata
- Qiñwa Pampa
- Qiñwa P'unqu
- Quriwayrachina
- Q'ala Urqu
- Q'illu Pata
- Ranra
- Runa Runa
- Runtu
- Sara Sara
- Saywayuq
- Sumaq Pampa
- Tinku
- Wamani
- Wamanripa Q'asa
- Warmi P'unqu
- Wilachiri
- Yana Mach'ay
- Yana Ranra
- Yana Sallani
- Yana Urqu

== Political division ==
The province extends over an area of 2,096.92 square kilometres (809.63 sq mi) and is divided into ten districts. The districts, with their capitals in parentheses, are:

- Colta (Colta
- Corculla (Corculla)
- Lampa (Lampa)
- Marcabamba (Marcabamba)
- Oyolo (Oyolo)
- Pararca (Pararca)
- Pausa (Pausa)
- San Javier de Alpabamba (San Javier de Alpabamba)
- San José de Ushua (San José de Ushua)
- Sara Sara District (Qilcata)

== Ethnic groups ==
The people in the province are mainly indigenous citizens of Quechua descent. Quechua is the language which the majority of the population (50.15%) learned to speak in childhood, 49.36% of the residents started speaking using the Spanish language (2007 Peru Census).

== See also ==
- Ccotapampa
- Hatun Tipiqucha
- Huch'uy Tipiqucha
- Kunturqucha
