= Ayna District =

Coordinates: 12.6183°S 73.8078°W

Ayna
- District
- Interactive map of Ayna
- Country: Peru
- Region: Ayacucho
- Province: La Mar
- Founded: January 17, 1945
- Capital: San Francisco

Government
  - Mayor: Eduardo Claudio Urbano Mendez

Area
  - Total: 265.73 km^{2} (102.60 sq mi)
- Elevation: 610 m (2,000 ft)

Population (2005 census)
  - Total: 8,457
  - Density: 31.83/km^{2} (82.43/sq mi)
- Time zone: UTC-5 (PET)
- UBIGEO: 050503

Ayna District is one of eight districts of the province La Mar in Peru.

== Ethnic groups ==
The people in the district are mainly indigenous citizens of Quechua descent. Quechua is the language which the majority of the population (62.57%) learnt to speak in childhood, 36.67% of the residents started speaking using the Spanish language (2007 Peru Census). The population is about 900.
