= Pararca District =

Coordinates: 15.2162°S 73.4649°W

Pararca
- District
- Interactive map of Pararca
- Country: Peru
- Region: Ayacucho
- Province: Paucar del Sara Sara
- Capital: Pararca

Government
  - Mayor: Eden Maximo Mayorga Falcon

Area
  - Total: 57.91 km^{2} (22.36 sq mi)
- Elevation: 3,010 m (9,880 ft)

Population (2005 census)
  - Total: 628
  - Density: 10.8/km^{2} (28.1/sq mi)
- Time zone: UTC-5 (PET)
- UBIGEO: 050807

Pararca District is one of ten districts of the province Paucar del Sara Sara in Peru.

== Ethnic groups ==
The people in the district are mainly indigenous citizens of Quechua descent. Quechua is the language which the majority of the population (73.44%) learnt to speak in childhood, 26.09% of the residents started speaking using the Spanish language (2007 Peru Census).
