= K'allapayuq Urqu =

Archaeological site in Peru

- Location within Peru
- 13°01′34″S 73°45′18″W
- Cultures: Chanka
- Location: Peru, Ayacucho Region
- Region: Andes

Site notes
- Height: 3,935 m (12,910 ft)
- Area: 10 ha (25 acres)

K'allapayuq Urqu (Quechua k'allapa stretcher, yuq a suffix to indicate ownership, urqu mountain, "the mountain with a stretcher", also spelled Callapayoc Orqo, Kallapayuq Orqo) is an archaeological site in the Ayacucho Region in Peru on top of a mountain of the same name. The Chanka site lies in the La Mar Province, Anco District, between the communities of Uskhuqucha (Husjucocha, Osqoqocha, Uscoqocha) and Anchiway (Anchihuay). It is situated at a height of about 3,935 m (12,910 ft).
