= Marcabamba District =

Coordinates: 15.1470°S 73.3452°W

Marcabamba Markapampa
- District
- Interactive map of Marcabamba
- Country: Peru
- Region: Ayacucho
- Province: Paucar del Sara Sara
- Founded: April 3, 1964
- Capital: Marcabamba

Government
  - Mayor: Isaac Castañeda Ramos

Area
  - Total: 122.53 km^{2} (47.31 sq mi)
- Elevation: 2,600 m (8,500 ft)

Population (2005 census)
  - Total: 775
  - Density: 6.32/km^{2} (16.4/sq mi)
- Time zone: UTC-5 (PET)
- UBIGEO: 050805

Marcabamba District is one of ten districts of the province Paucar del Sara Sara in Peru.
