= Samugari District =

Coordinates: 12.7668°S 73.6647°W

Samugari
- District
- Interactive map of Samugari
- Country: Peru
- Region: Ayacucho
- Province: La Mar
- Founded: July 16, 2010
- Capital: Palmapampa

Government
  - Mayor: Heiser Anaya
- Elevation: 810 m (2,660 ft)
- Time zone: UTC-5 (PET)
- UBIGEO: 050502

Samugari District is one of ten districts of the province La Mar in Peru.
