= Waraqu Urqu =

Archaeological site in Peru

- Cultures: Chanka
- Location: Peru, Ayacucho Region
- Region: Andes

Site notes
- Height: 3,852 m (12,638 ft)
- Area: 2 ha (4.9 acres)

Waraqu Urqu (Quechua waraqu cactus, urqu mountain, "cactus mountain", also spelled Waraju Orqo, Waraqo Orqo) is an archaeological site in the Ayacucho Region in Peru. The Chanka site lies in the La Mar Province, in the west of the Anco District, near Sacha Raqay (Sacharajay, Sacharaccay). It is situated at a height of about 3,852 m (12,638 ft).

Southeast of Sacha Raqay there is a mountain named Wanaku Urqu (Quechua wanaku guanaco, "guanaco mountain", hispanicized Huanaco Orjo). It lies at 13°07′13″S 73°49′57″W.
