= Millu (Ayacucho) =

Mountain in Peru

- Location within Peru

Highest point
- Elevation: 4,800 m (15,700 ft)
- Coordinates: 14°42′22″S 73°42′00″W

Geography
- Location: Peru, Ayacucho Region
- Parent range: Andes

Millu (Aymara for a kind of salpeter, Quechua for salty, Hispanicized spelling Millo) is a mountain in the Andes of Peru, about 4,800 m (15,748 ft) high. It is situated in the Ayacucho Region, Parinacochas Province, Coracora District. Millu lies northwest of Puka Punchu and northeast of Q'illu Urqu.
