= Luis Carranza =

Luis Carranza may refer to:

- Luis Carranza (economist) (born 1966), Peruvian economist, politician, banker and academic
- Luis Carranza (footballer) (born 1998), Peruvian footballer
- Luis Carranza District, a district of the province La Mar, Peru
