= Lampa District, Paucar del Sara Sara =

Coordinates: 15.1852°S 73.3503°W

Lampa District
- District
- Interactive map of Lampa District
- Country: Peru
- Region: Ayacucho
- Province: Paucar del Sara Sara
- Capital: Lampa

Government
  - Mayor: Francisco Eleuterio Gutierrez Diaz

Area
  - Total: 289.45 km^{2} (111.76 sq mi)
- Elevation: 2,850 m (9,350 ft)

Population (2005 census)
  - Total: 2,214
  - Density: 7.649/km^{2} (19.81/sq mi)
- Time zone: UTC-5 (PET)
- UBIGEO: 050804

Lampa District is one of ten districts of the province Paucar del Sara Sara in Peru.

== Ethnic groups ==
The people in the district are mainly indigenous citizens of Quechua descent. Quechua is the language which the majority of the population (54.73%) learnt to speak in childhood, 44.72% of the residents started speaking using the Spanish language (2007 Peru Census).
