= Chumpi District =

Coordinates: 14°41′38″S 74°07′27″W

Chumpi
- District
- Interactive map of Chumpi
- Country: Peru
- Region: Ayacucho
- Province: Parinacochas
- Capital: Chumpi

Government
  - Mayor: Celso Cirineo Geldres Cuadros

Area
  - Total: 366.3 km^{2} (141.4 sq mi)
- Elevation: 3,201 m (10,502 ft)

Population (2005 census)
  - Total: 3,062
  - Density: 8.359/km^{2} (21.65/sq mi)
- Time zone: UTC-5 (PET)
- UBIGEO: 050702

Chumpi District is one of eight districts of the Parinacochas Province in Peru.

== Geography ==
One of the highest mountains of the district is Pisti at approximately 4,200 m (13,800 ft). Other mountains are listed below:

- Ancha Qhata
- Ayrampuyuq
- Chilla P'ukru
- Ch'akiqucha
- Kiswar
- Kiswarniyuq
- Kuntur Sirk'a
- Phuyusqa
- Qullqa
- Quri Pampa
- Q'illu Urqu
- Saqsa
- Sinqata
- Titankayuq
- Wamantirka
- Wisk'achani
- Yana Urqu

== Ethnic groups ==
The people in the district are mainly indigenous citizens of Quechua descent. Quechua is the language which the majority of the population (70.22%) learnt to speak in childhood, 29.61% of the residents started speaking using the Spanish language (2007 Peru Census).
