= Huch'uy Tipiqucha =

Lake in Peru

- Location within Peru
- Location: Peru; Ayacucho Region
- Coordinates: 14°54′34″S 73°08′59″W

Huch'uy Tipiqucha (Quechua huch'uy small, tipi Pennisetum clandestinum (a grass species), tipiy to husk maize, to snap, to break, qucha lake, Hispanicized spelling Uchuytipicocha) is a lake in Peru located in the Ayacucho Region, Paucar del Sara Sara Province, Oyolo District. It lies between the lakes Tipiqucha in the north and Hatun Tipiqucha in the south, northeast of the lakes Yanaqucha ("black lake"), Kunturqucha and Chawpi Tipiqucha.

== See also ==
- List of lakes in Peru
