= Hatun Tipiqucha =

Lake in Peru

- Location within Peru
- Location: Peru; Ayacucho Region
- Coordinates: 14°55′14″S 73°08′41″W

Hatun Tipiqucha (Quechua hatun big, tipi Pennisetum clandestinum (a grass species), tipiy to husk maize, to snap, to break, qucha lake, Hispanicized spelling Ccatuntipicocha) is a lake in Peru located in the Ayacucho Region, Paucar del Sara Sara Province, Oyolo District. It lies south of the lakes Tipiqucha and Huch'uy Tipiqucha, and northeast of the lakes Yanaqucha ("black lake") and Kunturqucha.

== See also ==
- List of lakes in Peru
