= Puka Urqu (Arequipa) =

Mountain in Peru

- Location within Peru

Highest point
- Elevation: 4,923.1 m (16,152 ft)
- Coordinates: 15°13′59″S 73°7′00″W

Geography
- Location: Peru, Arequipa Region, La Unión Province, Ayacucho Region, Paucar del Sara Sara Province
- Parent range: Andes

Puka Urqu (Quechua puka red, urqu mountain, "red mountain", Hispanicized spelling Pucaorcco) is a mountain in the Andes of Peru, about 4,923.1 metres (16,152 ft) high. It is situated in the Arequipa Region, La Unión Province, Charcana District, and in the Ayacucho Region, Paucar del Sara Sara Province, Oyolo District. Puka Urqu lies west of Charcana, between the mountains Qinchu (Gencho) in the north and Anchaqalla (Anchacalla) in the south.
