= San José de Ushua District =

Coordinates: 15.2262°S 73.2306°W

San José de Ushua Uswa
- District
- Interactive map of San José de Ushua
- Country: Peru
- Region: Ayacucho
- Province: Paucar del Sara Sara
- Founded: December 20, 1955
- City: San José de Ushua

Government
  - Mayor: Julian Teofilo Loaiza Velasquez

Area
  - Total: 17.33 km^{2} (6.69 sq mi)
- Elevation: 3,040 m (9,970 ft)

Population (2005 census)
  - Total: 193
  - Density: 11.1/km^{2} (28.8/sq mi)
- Time zone: UTC-5 (PET)
- UBIGEO: 050809

San José de Ushua District is one of ten districts of the province Paucar del Sara Sara in Peru.

== See also ==
- Lujmani
