= Santa Rosa District, La Mar =

Coordinates: 12.6877°S 73.7459°W

Santa Rosa
- District
- Interactive map of Santa Rosa
- Country: Peru
- Region: Ayacucho
- Province: La Mar
- Founded: November 6, 1992
- Capital: Santa Rosa

Government
  - Mayor: Sr. Sabino Cavslcante Gomes

Area
  - Total: 372.27 km^{2} (143.73 sq mi)
- Elevation: 730 m (2,400 ft)

Population (2005 census)
  - Total: 10,717
  - Density: 28.788/km^{2} (74.561/sq mi)
- Time zone: UTC-5 (PET)
- UBIGEO: 050507

Santa Rosa District is one of eight districts of the province La Mar in Peru.

== Ethnic groups ==
The people in the district are mainly indigenous citizens of Quechua descent. Quechua is the language that the majority of the population (65.82%) learned to speak in childhood, 33.53% of the residents started speaking using the Spanish language (2007 Peru Census).

Type- Populated-a city, town, village, or other agglomeration of buildings where people live and work

Mindat.org Region - Ayacucho, Peru

Region- Santa Rosa, Provincia De La Mar, Ayacucho, Peru

Koppen climate type- cfb: Temperate Oceanic Climate
