= Pacapausa District =

Coordinates: 14°41′38″S 74°07′27″W

Pacapausa
- District
- Interactive map of Pacapausa
- Country: Peru
- Region: Ayacucho
- Province: Parinacochas
- Capital: Pacapausa

Government
  - Mayor: Remigio Ccerhuayo Verdi

Area
  - Total: 144.3 km^{2} (55.7 sq mi)
- Elevation: 2,852 m (9,357 ft)

Population (2005 census)
  - Total: 1,174
  - Density: 8.136/km^{2} (21.07/sq mi)
- Time zone: UTC-5 (PET)
- UBIGEO: 050704

Pacapausa District is one of eight districts of the province Parinacochas in Peru.

== Ethnic groups ==
The people in the district are mainly indigenous citizens of Quechua descent. Quechua is the language which the majority of the population (60.64%) learnt to speak in childhood, 39.10% of the residents started speaking using the Spanish language (2007 Peru Census).
