= Kunturqucha =

Lake in Peru

- Location within Peru
- Location: Peru; Ayacucho Region
- Coordinates: 14°56′06″S 73°09′50″W

Kunturqucha (Quechua hatun big, tipiy to husk maize, to snap, to break, qucha lake, hispanicized spelling Condorccocha) is a lake in Peru located in the Ayacucho Region, Paucar del Sara Sara Province, Oyolo District. It lies southwest of the lakes Tipiqucha, Huch'uy Tipiqucha, Hatun Tipiqucha and Chawpi Tipiqucha, and east of the lake Yanaqucha ("black lake").

== See also ==
- List of lakes in Peru
