= Lujmani =

Mountain in Peru

- Location within Peru

Highest point
- Elevation: 5,000 m (16,000 ft)
- Coordinates: 15°09′15″S 73°03′56″W

Geography
- Location: Peru, Arequipa Region
- Parent range: Andes

Lujmani (Aymara lujma a plant of the family Sapotaceae (possibly Lucuma bifera) -ni a suffix to indicate ownership, "the one with the lujma", Hispanicized spelling Lucmani) is a mountain in the Andes of Peru, about 5,000 metres (16,404 ft) high. It is located in the Arequipa Region, La Unión Province, Charcana District, and in the Paucar del Sara Sara Province, San José de Ushua District. It lies southwest of Chhulluni.
