= Q'illu Urqu (Ayacucho) =

Mountain in Peru

- Location within Peru

Highest point
- Elevation: 4,600 m (15,100 ft)
- Coordinates: 14°30′42″S 73°32′55″W

Geography
- Location: Peru, Ayacucho Region
- Parent range: Andes

Q'illu Urqu (Quechua q'illu yellow, urqu mountain, "yellow mountain", also spelled Ccello Orcco) is a mountain in the Andes of Peru, about 4,600 m (15,092 ft) high. It is situated in the Ayacucho Region, Lucanas Province, Chipao District, and in the Parinacochas Province, Coracora District. Q'illu Urqu lies southeast of Suyt'uqucha, Chawpiqucha and Wat'aqucha. Its ridge stretches from southwest to northeast.
