= Abraham Falcon =

Peruvian luthier

Abraham Falcón García (1924-2016) was a Peruvian luthier who made classical guitars. He was born on 16 March 1924 in Coracora, Ayacucho. From a young age, his life was focused on agricultural activities to help his family.

In 1946, Falcón made the first "Falcón's guitar", an instrument made of guarango (a piece of beautiful wood he had found near Palpa's river).

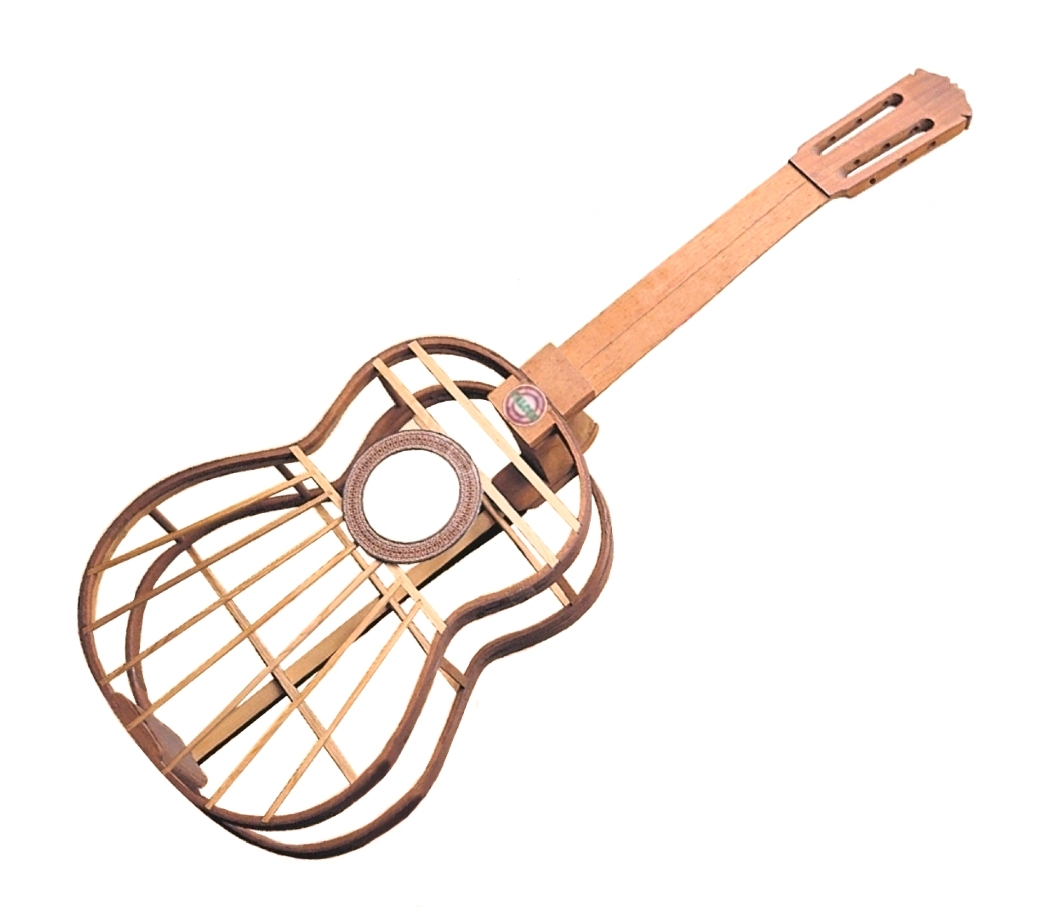
Schematic of the patented internal structure of a peruvian Falcón guitar.

His company, Guitarras Falcón, is now located in Lima, Peru. During his 70-year guitar-making career, he achieved several awards including placing third in the World Classical Guitar Luthier Competition in Paris, France in 1987 (XV Rencontres Internacionales de la Guitare) He is considered the most accomplished Peruvian luthier of the 20th century. Falcón's guitars have been used by many renowned Classical guitarists throughout the world as well as Andean and Criollo artists in Peru.

Falcón's trademark is in the design of the guitar skeleton which has a unique fan bracing system. This design was registered in National Patent Registry as Structural Innovation for the Peruvian Classical of Concert Guitar in 2009.

All of his concert guitar bodies are made of Indian palisandro; the tops are mostly made of European spruce, and the fretboards are made of African ebony.

Falcón died in December 2016.
