= San Francisco de Ravacayco District =

Coordinates: 14°41′38″S 74°07′27″W

San Francisco de Rivacayco
- District
- Interactive map of San Francisco de Rivacayco
- Country: Peru
- Region: Ayacucho
- Province: Parinacochas
- Founded: April 23, 1960
- Capital: San Francisco de Rivacayco

Government
  - Mayor: Godofredo Agripino Chiara Quirhuayo

Area
  - Total: 99.83 km^{2} (38.54 sq mi)
- Elevation: 2,852 m (9,357 ft)

Population (2005 census)
  - Total: 551
  - Density: 5.52/km^{2} (14.3/sq mi)
- Time zone: UTC-5 (PET)
- UBIGEO: 050707

San Francisco de Rivacayco District is one of eight districts of the province Parinacochas in Peru.

== Ethnic groups ==
The people in the district are mainly indigenous citizens of Quechua descent. Quechua is the language which the majority of the population (73.62%) learnt to speak in childhood, 26.22% of the residents started speaking using the Spanish language (2007 Peru Census).
