= Luis Carranza District =

Coordinates: 13.2970°S 73.8733°W

Luis Carranza
- District
- Interactive map of Luis Carranza
- Country: Peru
- Region: Ayacucho
- Province: La Mar
- Founded: December 11, 1963
- Capital: Pampas

Government
  - Mayor: Socrates Gutierrez Alarcon

Area
  - Total: 207.64 km^{2} (80.17 sq mi)
- Elevation: 2,952 m (9,685 ft)

Population (2005 census)
  - Total: 2,455
  - Density: 11.82/km^{2} (30.62/sq mi)
- Time zone: UTC-5 (PET)
- UBIGEO: 050506

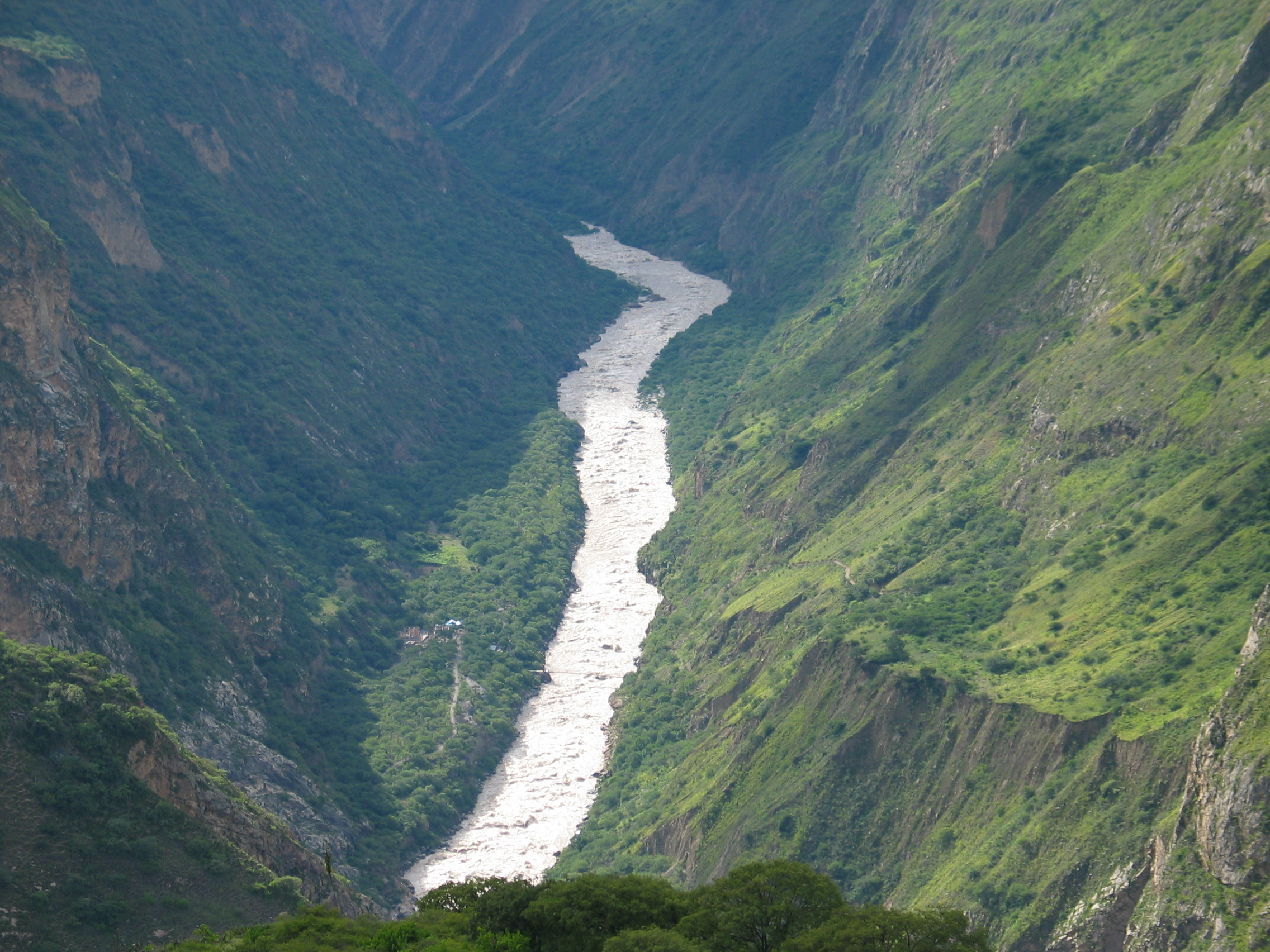

Luis Carranza District is one of eight districts of the province La Mar in Peru.

== Annexes of Luis Carranza District ==
- Ancamarca
- Ahua
- Huachinga
- Amaccoto
- Asnaccpampa
- Ccopayoc
- Ccayhuayoc
- Parobamba
- Tucubamba
- Mechecc
- Chaupiloma
- Chaquipuqio
- Sayripata
- Chinchipata
- Petecc
- Mollepucro
- Paccaypampa
- Moyocc
- Pampas
- Huaiccohuasi

== Ethnic groups ==
The people in the district are mainly indigenous citizens of Quechua descent. Quechua is the language which the majority of the population (96.02%) learnt to speak in childhood, 3.72% of the residents started speaking using the Spanish language (2007 Peru Census).
