= Luis Zacarías =

Peruvian football manager (1942–2023)

Personal information
- Full name: Luis Emiliano Zacarías Barraza
- Date of birth: 11 October 1942
- Place of birth: Coracora, Peru
- Date of death: 27 August 2023 (aged 80)
- Place of death: Cologne, Germany

Managerial career
- Years: Team
- 1975: Peru U-20
- 1977: Deportivo Municipal
- 1980: Universitario
- 1980: Peru (assistant)
- 1983–1985: MSV Duisburg
- 1987–1988: CNI
- 1988–1989: San Agustín
- 1994: Cienciano
- 1996: La Loretana
- 1997: Lawn Tennis FC
- 2003–2004: FC Locomotive Tbilisi
- 2006: SV Teutonia Coerde

Luis Emiliano Zacarías Barraza (11 October 1942 – 27 August 2023) was a Peruvian football manager.

== Early life ==
He was born in 1942 in Coracora (Peru). He attended the University of Cologne in Germany.

== Career ==
In 1975, he was appointed manager of the Peru national under-20 football team. In 1977, he was appointed manager of Peruvian side Deportivo Municipal that he saves from relegation at the last minute. In 1980, he was appointed interim manager of Peruvian side Universitario de Deportes. The same year, he served as Juan José Tan's assistant as head of the Peruvian national football team during a friendly match against Uruguay played at the Estadio Centenario on July 18, 1980.

In 1983, he was appointed manager of German side MSV Duisburg. He helped the club achieve third place. In 1987, he was appointed manager of Peruvian side Colegio Nacional Iquitos. In 1988, he was appointed manager of Peruvian side Deportivo San Agustín. In 1994, he was appointed manager of Peruvian side Cienciano. In 1996, he was appointed manager of Peruvian side La Loretana. In 1997, he was appointed manager of Peruvian side Lawn Tennis FC. In 2003, he was appointed manager of Georgian side FC Locomotive Tbilisi. In 2006, he was appointed manager of German side SV Teutonia Coerde.

== Personal life and death ==
After retiring from professional football management, he lived in Cologne, Germany. He worked as a columnist for Peruvian newspaper El Comercio. He died in Cologne at the age of 80.

== Honours ==
Lawn Tennis FC

- Peruvian Segunda División : 1997
