= Ccotapampa =

Human settlement in Peru

Coordinates: 15°17′24″S 073°11′46″W

Ccotapampa is a populated place in the mountain-like terrain of the Department of Ayacucho, Peru. Ccotapampa located 15.29 -73.1961111 and 4,263 metres (13,986 ft) above sea level.
