= San Miguel, La Mar province =

San Miguel
- Town
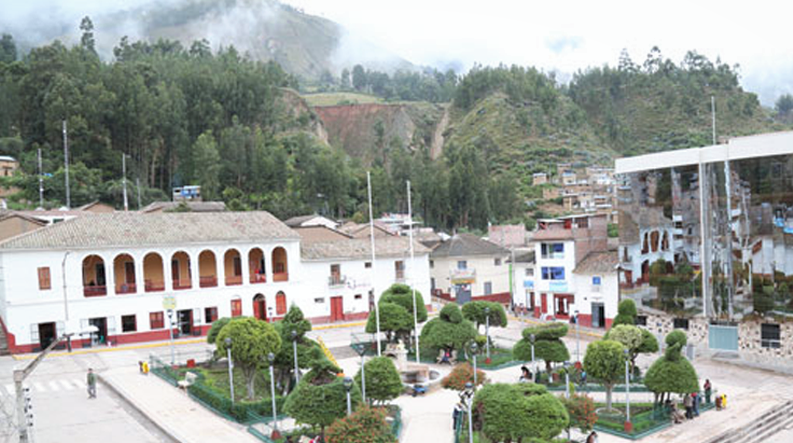

- Location within Peru
- Coordinates: 13°00′45.38″S 73°58′51.47″W
- Country: Peru
- Region: Ayacucho
- Province: La Mar
- District: San Miguel

Government
  - Mayor: Eulogio Vila Montaño
- Elevation: 2,661 m (8,730 ft)
- Time zone: UTC-5 (PET)

San Miguel is a town in Central Peru, capital of the province La Mar in the region Ayacucho.
