= Pausa District =

Coordinates: 15.2790°S 73.3471°W

Pausa Pawsa
- District
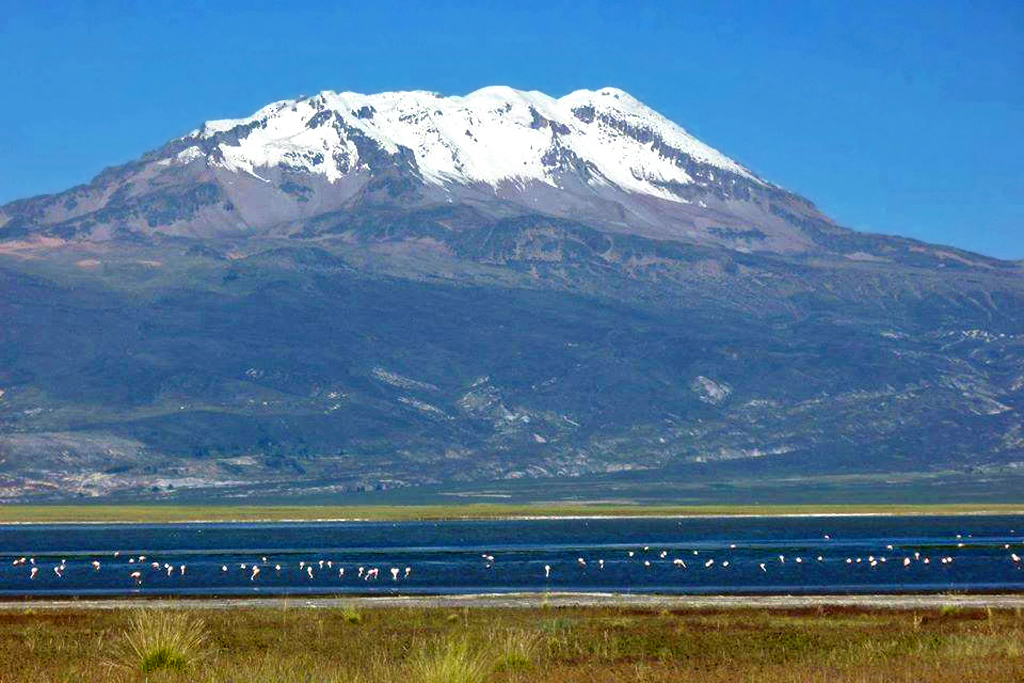
- Sara Sara, the highest mountain of the district
- Interactive map of Pausa
- Country: Peru
- Region: Ayacucho
- Province: Paucar del Sara Sara
- Capital: Pausa

Government
  - Mayor: José Felix Rosenthal Quispe

Area
  - Total: 242.78 km^{2} (93.74 sq mi)
- Elevation: 2,524 m (8,281 ft)

Population (2005 census)
  - Total: 3,242
  - Density: 13.35/km^{2} (34.59/sq mi)
- Time zone: UTC-5 (PET)
- UBIGEO: 050801

Pausa District is one of ten districts of the province Paucar del Sara Sara in Peru.

The volcano Sara Sara is situated in the district.

== Climate ==
Climate data for Pausa, elevation 2,489 m (8,166 ft), (1991–2020)
Month	Jan	Feb	Mar	Apr	May	Jun	Jul	Aug	Sep	Oct	Nov	Dec	Year
Mean daily maximum °C (°F)	23.0 (73.4)	22.1 (71.8)	22.5 (72.5)	23.0 (73.4)	23.2 (73.8)	22.9 (73.2)	22.8 (73.0)	23.2 (73.8)	23.6 (74.5)	23.9 (75.0)	24.0 (75.2)	23.6 (74.5)	23.2 (73.7)
Mean daily minimum °C (°F)	10.2 (50.4)	10.5 (50.9)	9.7 (49.5)	9.4 (48.9)	7.6 (45.7)	6.7 (44.1)	6.4 (43.5)	6.8 (44.2)	7.7 (45.9)	8.3 (46.9)	8.4 (47.1)	9.2 (48.6)	8.4 (47.1)
Average precipitation mm (inches)	59.1 (2.33)	78.9 (3.11)	55.5 (2.19)	13.5 (0.53)	1.2 (0.05)	0.8 (0.03)	1.5 (0.06)	2.7 (0.11)	1.5 (0.06)	2.6 (0.10)	1.4 (0.06)	13.9 (0.55)	232.6 (9.18)
Source: National Meteorology and Hydrology Service of Peru
