= Regional Government of Ayacucho =

Regional government in Peru

- Gobierno Regional de Ayacucho

Regional Government overview
- Formed: January 1, 2003; 23 years ago
- Jurisdiction: Department of Ayacucho
- Headquarters: Ayacucho
- Website: Government site

The Regional Government of Ayacucho (Spanish: Gobierno Regional de Ayacucho; GORE Ayacucho) is the regional government that represents the Department of Ayacucho. It is the body with legal identity in public law and its own assets, which is in charge of the administration of provinces of the department in Peru. Its purpose is the social, cultural and economic development of its constituency. It is based in the city of Ayacucho.

== List of representatives ==
Governor	Political party	Period
Omar Quesada	APRA	January 1, 2003–December 31, 2006
Isaac Molina Chávez	Movimiento Independiente Innovación Regional	January 1, 2007–December 31, 2010
Wilfredo Oscorima Núñez	Alianza para el Progreso	January 1, 2011–December 31, 2014
Wilfredo Oscorima Núñez	Alianza Renace Ayacucho	January 1, 2015–December 21, 2015
Julio Sevilla Sifuentes	Alianza para el Progreso	December 22, 2015–June 5, 2017
Wilfredo Oscorima Núñez	Alianza Renace Ayacucho	June 5, 2017–December 31, 2018
Carlos Rúa Carbajal	Musuq Ñan	January 1, 2019–December 31, 2022
Wilfredo Oscorima Núñez	Movimiento Regional Wari Llaqta	January 1, 2023–Incumbent

== See also ==
- Regional Governments of Peru
- Department of Ayacucho
