= Charcana District =

Coordinates: 15.2411°S 73.0796°W

Charcana
- District
- Interactive map of Charcana
- Country: Peru
- Region: Arequipa
- Province: La Unión
- Capital: Charcana

Government
  - Mayor: Juvenal Angel Llerena Perez

Area
  - Total: 165.27 km^{2} (63.81 sq mi)
- Elevation: 3,417 m (11,211 ft)

Population (2005 census)
  - Total: 691
  - Density: 4.18/km^{2} (10.8/sq mi)
- Time zone: UTC-5 (PET)
- UBIGEO: 040803

Charcana District is one of eleven districts of the La Unión Province in Peru.

== Geography ==
One of the highest peaks of the district is Lujmani at approximately 5,000 m (16,000 ft). Other mountains are listed below:

- Ancha Qalla
- Anta Marka
- Kimsa Puyku
- Puka Urqu
- Punta Wamani
- Qillqata
- Qinchu
- Qullqa
- Sillaqa
