= Millu =

Millu (Aymara for a kind of salpeter, Quechua for salty, Hispanicized spelling Millo) may refer to:

- Millu (Apurímac), a mountain in the Apurímac Region, Peru
- Millu (Ayacucho), a mountain in the Ayacucho Region, Peru
- Millu (Cusco), a mountain in the Cusco Region, Peru
- Millu (Moquegua), a mountain in the Moquegua Region, Peru
- Millu (Moquegua-Puno), a mountain on the border of the Moquegua Region and the Puno Region, Peru

== See also ==
- Millu Urqu, a mountain in Bolivia
