= Pumawiri =

Mountain in Peru

- Location within Peru

Highest point
- Elevation: 4,800 m (15,700 ft)
- Coordinates: 14°52′09″S 73°44′54″W

Geography
- Location: Peru, Ayacucho Region
- Parent range: Andes

Pumawiri (Hispanicized spelling Pumahuiri) is a mountain in the Andes of Peru, about 4,800 m (15,748 ft) high. It is situated in the Ayacucho Region, Parinacochas Province, Coracora District.
