= Parququcha (Peru) =

Lake in Peru

- Location within Peru
- Location: Peru; Ayacucho Region
- Coordinates: 14°39′5.6″S 73°41′40.1″W
- Surface elevation: 4,462 m (14,639 ft)

Parququcha (Quechua parquy irrigation, qucha lake, "irrigation lake", hispanicized spelling Parccoccocha) is a lake in Peru located in the Ayacucho Region, Parinacochas Province, Coracora District. It is situated at a height of about 4,462 metres (14,639 ft).

== See also ==
- List of lakes in Peru
