= Pausa, Peru =

Pausa
- Town
- Location within Peru
- Coordinates: 15°16′47″S 73°20′45″W
- Country: Peru
- Region: Ayacucho
- Province: Paucar del Sara Sara
- District: Pausa

Government
  - Mayor: José Felix Rosenthal Quispe
- Elevation: 2,524 m (8,281 ft)
- Time zone: UTC-5 (PET)

Pausa (Quechua Pawsa an S-shaped curvilinear design) is a town in Central Peru, capital of the province Paucar del Sara Sara in the region Ayacucho.
