= La Florida District =

Coordinates: 6.8687°S 79.1233°W

La Florida
- District
- Interactive map of La Florida
- Country: Peru
- Region: Cajamarca
- Province: San Miguel
- Founded: March 26, 1965
- Capital: La Florida

Government
  - Mayor: Jesús Jubenal Cueva Capa

Area
  - Total: 61.33 km^{2} (23.68 sq mi)
- Elevation: 900 m (3,000 ft)

Population (2005 census)
  - Total: 2,666
  - Density: 43.47/km^{2} (112.6/sq mi)
- Time zone: UTC-5 (PET)
- UBIGEO: 061106

La Florida District is one of thirteen districts of the province San Miguel in Peru.

== More information ==
http://www.atlascajamarca.info/index.php?option=com_content&task=section&id=29&Itemid=75
