= Parinacochas province =

Coordinates: 15.016994°S 73.780419°W

Parinacochas
- Province
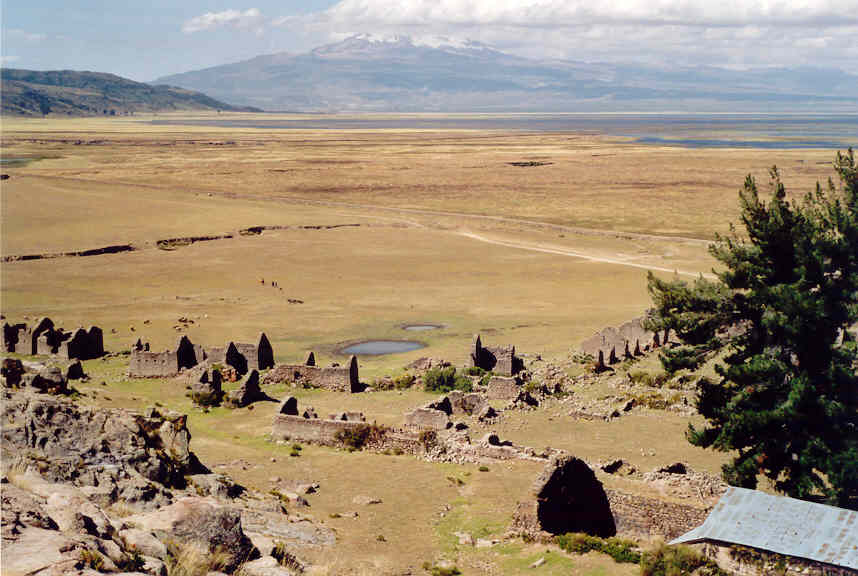
- The archaeological site of Inkawasi with the volcano Sara Sara and the lake Parinaqucha in the background

- Location of Parinacochas in the Ayacucho Region
- Country: Peru
- Region: Ayacucho
- Capital: Coracora

Area
  - Total: 5,968.32 km^{2} (2,304.38 sq mi)

Population (2002)
  - Total: 24,028
  - Density: 4.0259/km^{2} (10.427/sq mi)

Parinacochas is a province located in the Ayacucho Region of Peru. It is one of the eleven that make up that region. The province has a population of 24,028 inhabitants as of 2002. The capital of the province is Coracora.

== Boundaries ==
- North: Apurímac Region
- East: province of Paucar del Sara Sara
- South: Arequipa Region
- West: province of Lucanas

== Geography ==
The highest mountain in the province is Sara Sara at 5,505 m (18,061 ft) on the border to the Paucar del Sara Sara Province. Other mountains are listed below:

- Allqa Q'awa
- Anta P'unqu
- Apachitayuq
- Aqu Q'asa
- Chachakuma
- Challwa Q'asa
- Chawpi Urqu
- Chuku Chuku
- Chunta
- Hatun Qiwuña
- Iskay Pata
- Kiswar
- Kiswarniyuq
- Kuntur Qhata
- Kunturi
- Kunturillu
- Lunq'u
- Maranniyuq
- Millu
- Milluni
- Pilluni
- Pirqa
- Pirwa
- Pisqa Pukyu
- Puka Kunka
- Puka Mach'ay
- Puka Punchu
- Puka Puka
- Puka Ranra
- Puka Saywa
- Pukaqucha
- Pumawiri
- Phiruru
- Qiwña Urqu
- Qullpa Pampa
- Qullqata
- Quriwiri
- Qhata Urqu
- Q'ara Pukyu
- Q'illu
- Q'illu Q'asa
- Q'illu Urqu (Luc.-Par.)
- Q'illu Urqu (Par.)
- Ranrayuq
- Silla Q'asa
- Suparawra
- Uqhu Sinqa
- Wachwani
- Waman Pirqa
- Wamanqucha
- Wamanripa
- Wayunka
- Yana Mach'ay
- Yana Qaqa
- Yana Saya
- Yana Urqu
- Yaritayuq
- Yuraq Phiruru
- Yuraq Q'asa

== Political division ==
The province extends over an area of 5,968.32 square kilometres (2,304.38 sq mi) and is divided into eight districts:

- Coracora
- Chumpi
- Coronel Castañeda
- Pacapausa
- Pullo
- Puyusca
- San Francisco de Ravacayco
- Upahuacho

== Ethnic groups ==
The people in the province are mainly indigenous citizens of Quechua descent. Quechua is the language which the majority of the population (54.94%) learnt to speak in childhood, 44.60% of the residents started speaking using the Spanish language (2007 Peru Census).

== See also ==
- Inka Wasi
- Parinaqucha
- Parququcha
- Tipiqucha
