= Kevin Pauza =

- Education: Pennsylvania State University University of Pennsylvania Columbia University College of Physicians & Surgeons Lehigh University
- Years active: 1990-present
- Known for: Spinal disc treatment, Discseel
- Medical career
- Profession: Physiatrist, Texas Spine and Joint Hospital
- Sub-specialties: Physical Medicine & Rehabilitation
- Website: http://drkevinpauza.com

Kevin Pauza is an American physiatrist and interventional spine specialist. He is the co-founder of the Texas Spine and Joint Hospital located in Tyler, Texas. Pauza developed the Discseel procedure for the treatment of spinal disorders known as the Pauza Disc Treatment, which claims to repair re-grow discs without a spinal fusion.

Pauza has treated many international clients for chronic back pain and spinal disc degeneration, and served as a medical advisor to the Saudi royal family.

== Early life ==
Kevin Pauza was born on December 15, 1964, in Hershey, Pennsylvania, with twin sister Jill Ann Pauza. He and his three siblings grew up on his parents' farm. His mother, Gail Ann Pauza, was a registered nurse, and his father, William Vito Pauza, is a farmer, land conservationist, and inventor.

== Career ==
Pauza is a physiatrist and a founding partner of the Texas Spine and Joint Hospital in Tyler, Texas. Pauza received degrees from University of Pennsylvania, Columbia University College of Physicians and Surgeons, Penn State College of Medicine, and Lehigh University.

Outside of treating patients with chronic lower back pain and degenerative disc disease, Pauza is on the editorial panel of several scientific journals, committees and boards. He established the John Dehaan Foundation which annually awards $250,000 for advances in nonsurgical spinal treatment. In 2008, Penn State College of Medicine recognized Pauza with the Alumni Fellow Award. Pauza served on the advisory board of several medical tech companies.

=== Pauza Disc Treatment ===
Pauza developed the Pauza Disc Treatment and Biostat System, a minimally invasive procedure that repairs and re-grows discs for the treatment of spinal pain and disorders including degenerative disc disease. Pauza holds a series of 16 patents for a device and Discseel biologic that support the treatment. The procedure involves injecting two components of blood plasma, thrombin and fibrinogen, which combine to make fibrin, into damaged spinal discs for the treatment of spinal conditions such as degenerative disc disease, back pain and chronic low back pain, or internal disc disruption. The Biostat intradiscal fibrin sealant underwent multiple Food and Drug Administration studies to become an FDA approved Discseel biologic that reduces back pain and regrows degenerated spinal discs. On July 18, 2013, it was announced the results of its Phase III Investigational New Drug study had not met its success criteria, and injections of the Fibrin Sealant were not statistically significantly better than saline injections. As of early 2021, major insurance providers still classify Discseel as an experimental or investigational procedure, given weaknesses in the positive studies and a general lack of medical community acknowledgement or randomized controlled trials on the treatment.

=== Disciplinary actions and charges of malpractice ===
In 2013 Pauza was reprimanded by and entered into a disciplinary agreement with the Texas State Medical Board. The Medical Board found that Pauza failed to meet expected standards of care, failed to follow the board's guidelines for the treatment of pain, failed to keep adequate medical records and failed to cooperate with board staff. Two years later the Board extended the order, after it "found Dr. Pauza’s medical records for the patient at issue were inadequate and that Dr. Pauza’s stated rationale for prescribing a medication as a sleep aid and for treating the patient with corticosteroid injections after a five-year treatment hiatus were inadequate." In 2018 he was reprimanded again for failing to document his rationale behind a diagnosis of lumbar disc pain and lumbar radiculopathy, and for failing to document either that he had considered simpler and less invasive treatment options for the patient than the procedure he performed, or that his patient had chosen to forego conventional treatment. In both incidents he was required to take remedial education in risk management and related subjects.
