= Chilcas =

Coordinates: 32°36′33″S 60°10′08″W

- Municipality and village
- Interactive map of Chilcas
- Country: Argentina
- Province: Entre Ríos Province
- Time zone: UTC−3 (ART)

Chilcas is a village and municipality in Entre Ríos Province in north-eastern Argentina.
