= Upahuacho District =

Coordinates: 14°41′38″S 74°07′27″W

Upahuacho Upa Wachu
- District
- Interactive map of Upahuacho
- Country: Peru
- Region: Ayacucho
- Province: Parinacochas
- Founded: April 10, 1961
- Capital: Upahuacho

Government
  - Mayor: Edwin Francisco Puga Jurado

Area
  - Total: 587.35 km^{2} (226.78 sq mi)
- Elevation: 3,319 m (10,889 ft)

Population (2005 census)
  - Total: 2,134
  - Density: 3.633/km^{2} (9.410/sq mi)
- Time zone: UTC-5 (PET)
- UBIGEO: 050708

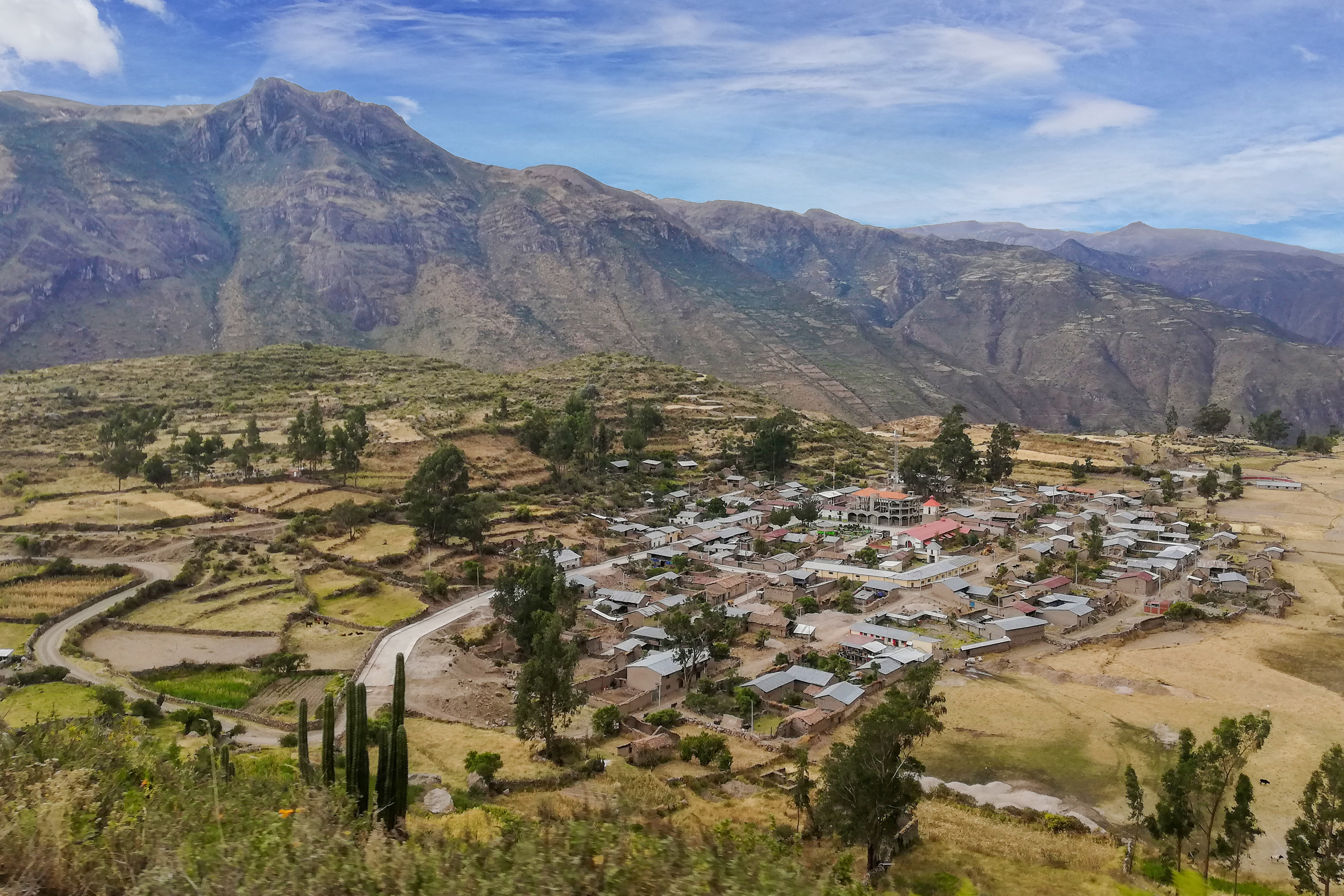
Panoramic view of Upahuacho District, Parinacochas Province, Ayacucho, Peru.

Upahuacho District is one of eight districts of the Parinacochas Province in Peru.

== Ethnic groups ==
The people in the district are mainly indigenous citizens of Quechua descent. Quechua is the language which the majority of the population (90.78%) learnt to speak in childhood, 8.87% of the residents started speaking using the Spanish language (2007 Peru Census).
