= Lake Parinacochas =

Lake in the Ayacucho Region in Peru

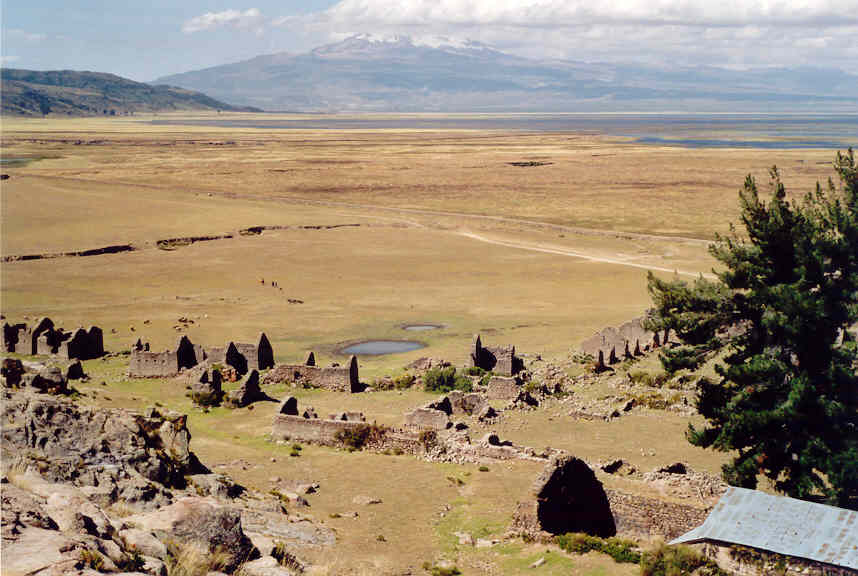
- Sara Sara volcano rises above Lake Parinacochas

- Location within Peru
- Location: Ayacucho Region
- Coordinates: 15.3°S 73.7°W
- Catchment area: 606.5 km^{2} (234.2 sq mi)
- Basin countries: Peru
- Max. length: 12 km (7.5 mi)
- Max. width: 9 km (5.6 mi)
- Surface elevation: 3,272 m (10,735 ft)

Lake Parinacochas (possibly from Aymara parina flamingo, Quechua qucha lake, lagoon, "flamingo lake") is a lake in Ayacucho Region in Peru. It is located west of Sara Sara volcano at an elevation of 3,272 metres (10,735 ft) above sea level. The lake is 12 km long and 9 km wide, and has a catchment area of 606.5 square kilometres (234 sq mi).

Lake Parinacochas is a shallow brackish lake, with some salt pan areas appearing at low water levels.

Inkawasi, a ruined village of Inca origin, lies on the north-western shore of Lake Parinacochas.

== Ecology ==
=== Flora ===
The lake is located in a dry puna grassland region. Aquatic vegetation is represented by reeds of Typha sp. and submerged plants of genus Potamogeton.

== See also ==
- Sara Sara
- List of lakes in Peru
