= Sara Sara =

Volcano in Peru

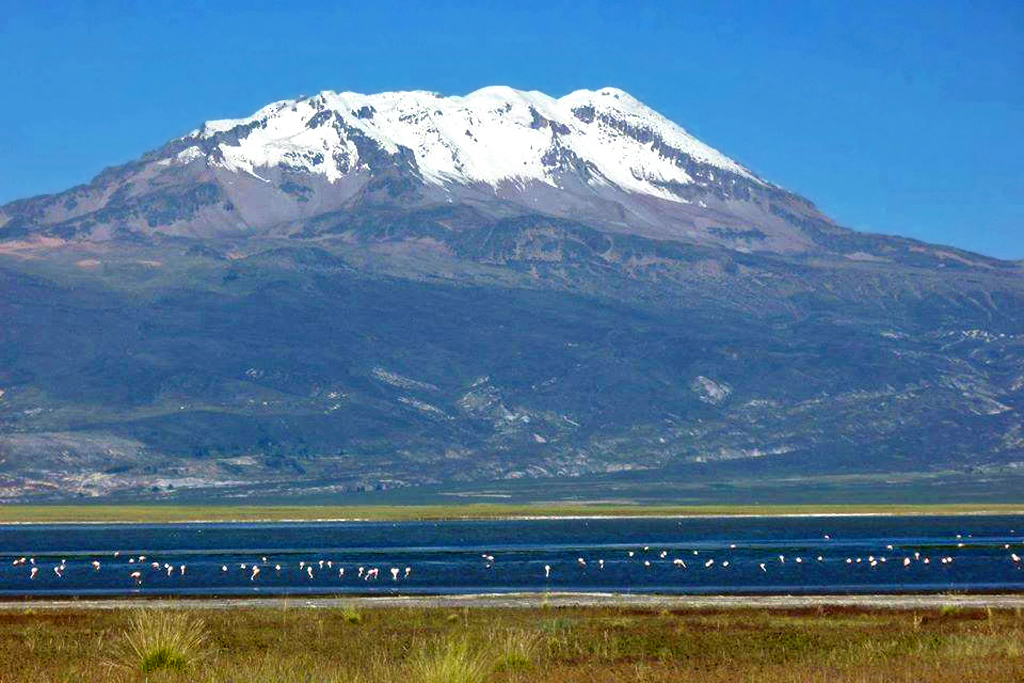
- Sara Sara and Lake Parinacochas in front of it

Highest point
- Elevation: 5,505 m (18,061 ft)
- Prominence: 2,060 m (6,760 ft)
- Listing: Ultra
- Coordinates: 15°19′46″S 73°26′41″W

Geography
- Location within Peru
- Location: Peru, Ayacucho Region
- Parent range: Andes

Geology
- Rock age: Pleistocene
- Last eruption: Unknown; probable Holocene age

Sara Sara is a 5,505-metre-high (18,061 ft) volcano lying between Lake Parinacochas and the Ocoña River in Peru. It is situated in the provinces of Parinacochas and Paucar del Sara Sara. The volcano formed during the Pleistocene during four different stages of volcanic activity, which constructed a volcanic edifice with an oval outline consisting of lava flows and lava domes. The volcano was glaciated during the Last Glacial Maximum; it may still feature glaciers. The last eruption was about 14,000 years ago and future eruptions are possible. The volcano was worshipped by the local population, and an Inca mummy of a 15-year old girl was found on the summit by archaeologists.

== Geography and geomorphology ==
Sara Sara lies within the Cordillera Ampato sub-range of the Andes. Administratively, it is located in the Parinacochas and Paucar del Sara Sara provinces of the Ayacucho Region, Peru. The town of Pausa lies 12 kilometres (7.5 mi) away from the volcano, and agriculture occurs in the valleys of the area. A disused road passes over the southern flank of the volcano and reaches an elevation of 4,600 metres (15,100 ft).

The volcano is 5,505 metres (18,061 ft) high and has an oval outline; the summit lies at the southern end of a north-northwest-south-southeast trending summit ridge. It consists of a complex of lava domes and lava flows superposed on older stratovolcanoes and has a total volume of 20–25 cubic kilometres (4.8–6.0 cu mi), with the edifice rising about 1 kilometre (0.62 mi) above the surrounding terrain. The vents are aligned in north-northeast-south-southwest direction and are accompanied by lateral lava domes. These vents were the source of lava flows and block-and-ash flows generated by the collapse of lava domes. Thick ash deposits underlie viscous lava flows that define the "Mollebamba Volcanics" and reach lengths of 15 kilometres (9.3 mi). A pyroclastic cone of recent age is found on the mountain and a recent lava flow descends the eastern flank. The western flank is heavily eroded. West of the volcano is Lake Parinacochas to its east is the Ocoña River.

=== Glaciers ===
Glacial cirques, glacial valleys and numerous moraines surround the volcano. Two past glaciations have been described, "Sara Sara II" which descended to about 4,500 metres (14,800 ft) elevation and also encompassed several peaks south of Sara Sara such as the 4,703 metres (15,430 ft) high Cerro Puca Puca, and "Sara Sara I" which has left moraine networks at lower elevations especially on the southwestern flank. The lowest moraines on the western flank occur at 4,000–4,100 metres (13,100–13,500 ft) while these on the eastern flank only reach 4,300 metres (14,100 ft), presumably because of the effects of later volcanism that erased other moraines. Some of these encompass closed depressions. A third set of moraines at higher elevations appears to correspond to the neoglacial. Pleistocene moraines occur mostly on the western side of the volcano and Holocene ones on the eastern. The Last Glacial Maximum at Sara Sara occurred between 24,000 and 17,000 years ago and the equilibrium line altitude descended to 4,500–4,800 metres (14,800–15,700 ft).

Presently, it reaches 5,200 metres (17,100 ft) elevation at Sara Sara. The mountain has been called glaciated, with an ice cap covering approximately 20 square kilometres (7.7 sq mi), and alternatively, it has been stated that it only has a temporary snow cover. Active rock glaciers extend below the snowline on the western and northern flanks, and inactive rock glaciers are found at lower elevations. Water used for irrigation originates at Sara Sara's foot.

== Geology ==
The Quaternary volcanoes of Peru are part of the Central Volcanic Zone (CVZ) of the Andes and Sara Sara is the northernmost member. The CVZ features consists of two arcs of volcanoes on both sides of the Western Cordillera and features composite volcanoes, lava domes and lava flows, of which El Misti, Huaynaputina, Sabancaya, Ticsani, Tutupaca, Ubinas and Yucamane have been active in historical times. Ampato, Chachani, Casiri, Coropuna and Sara Sara are dormant volcanoes. The volcanism is triggered by the subduction of the Nazca Plate underneath the South America Plate, which takes place off the western coast of South America. North of Sara Sara, a gap occurs in the volcanic belt, probably because the Nazca Ridge subducts there. Volcanic activity in the region commenced about 200 million years ago and increased about 30 million years ago, forming the 34-30 million years old Tacaza Group, the 24-10 million years old Huaylillas Group and the 10-1 million years old Barroso Group volcanics, after which volcanic activity declined again.

The basement is formed by Precambrian and Paleozoic rocks, which are covered by Mesozoic and Cenozoic sediments and volcanites. Unlike other CVZ volcanoes, where the basement rocks are part of the so-called Arequipa-Antofalla domain, Sara Sara overlies the distinct Paracas domain. The volcano is part of a 30 kilometres (19 mi) long, fault-controlled chain of volcanoes, which includes Cerro Grande, Yarihuato, Puca Ccasa, Sara Sara, Puca Puca and Cerro Queñuapunco. A major geological lineament known as the Sara Sara lineament runs across the volcano in northwest-southeast direction. Several faults cross the edifice in the same direction, and some were active during the Holocene.

A depression west of Sara Sara which contains the Laguna Parinacochas may be the source of the regional Caraveli ignimbrite that was emplaced 8-9 million years ago. This depression constitutes the 25 by 35 kilometres (16 mi × 22 mi) wide Incahuasi caldera, which may be connected to the magmatic system of Sara Sara.

During its history, Sara Sara has produced andesite, dacite, rhyolite and trachyandesite, with dacite predominating during Quaternary eruptions. The rocks define a potassium-rich calc-alkaline suite. Phenocrysts in the rocks include amphibole, biotite, hornblende, iron-titanium oxide, plagioclase, quartz, sanidine and sphene, and both their quantity and chemistry varied between various stages of activity. The volcaniclastic rocks of Sara Sara define the Sara Sara Formation, a geological formation defined for the western sector of the volcano. The Sara Sara volcanics are sometimes considered part of the Barroso Group of volcanic rocks. The downgoing plate produced fluids that metasomatized the overlying mantle; melts from this mantle yield the magmas of Sara Sara through several intermediate processes.

== Climate, vegetation and economic activity ==
The climate shows altitudinal zonation, with temperatures ranging from 20–6 °C (68–43 °F) in the valleys to freezing temperatures above 5,200 metres (17,100 ft). Precipitation is seasonal and mostly falls during summer, at higher elevations in the form of hail and snow which covers the ground for months. There are no close weather stations, but above 4,500 metres (14,800 ft) elevation the climate is always cold with temperatures never rising above 5 °C (41 °F).

Trees grow at lower elevations, while only ichu and quinua are present above 4,000 metres (13,000 ft). Alfalfa and maize are cultivated at lower altitudes. Animal husbandry, small commerce and tourism complete the economic activities of the region.

== Eruption history ==
Sara Sara was active during the last 2 million years and produced the lower Barroso and Lampa Volcanics. Fresh lava and pyroclastic flows imply recent activity. The volcanic activity has been subdivided into four stages:

- Some publications define a first stage featuring lava flow and lava dome emissions.
- The first stage featured an alternation of explosive eruptions and effusive eruptions. Two events took place 500,000±270,000 and 370,000±150,000 years ago. It also featured a sector collapse in the northeastern sector of Sara Sara.
- During the second stage lava domes grew and collapsed on the volcano, one such event occurred 162,000±20,000 years ago on the eastern flank.
- The third stage consisted of dacitic lava flows that built the actual cone of the volcano, beginning 63,000-58,000 years ago.
- Sometimes considered part of the third stage, the fourth stage is subdivided into two sub-stages before and after 64,000 years ago. The last stage produced 14 kilometres (8.7 mi) long lava flows from a cone named Yana Ranra on the eastern flank. This flow is dated to 14,000±4,000 years ago.

Two pyroclastic flows were dated to 44,500 and 49,200 years before present and lava flows with ages of 340,000±60,000 to 50,000±10,000 years ago. Sara Sara is currently classified as a dormant volcano and there is seismic activity. The occurrence of fumarolic activity was reported in 1963. Hot springs are found northeast of Sara Sara in the Quilcata Valley and close to the town of Chacaraya, implying the presence of a shallow magma chamber.

=== Hazards and monitoring ===
The volcano is considered to be "moderately dangerous" by the Peruvian Geological Service. Future eruptions may endanger a population of 12,000-8,000 around the volcano, which would be threatened by lahars, pyroclastic flows and tephra fallout. Aside from Pausa, other towns and Lake Parinacochas (an important source of water for the region) are located close to the volcano. Volcanic hazard maps have been published. Since 2018, the volcano is monitored by the Peruvian Geological Service; Macedo Sánchez 2016 recommended seismic and other monitoring techniques for Sara Sara.

== Archeology and religious importance ==
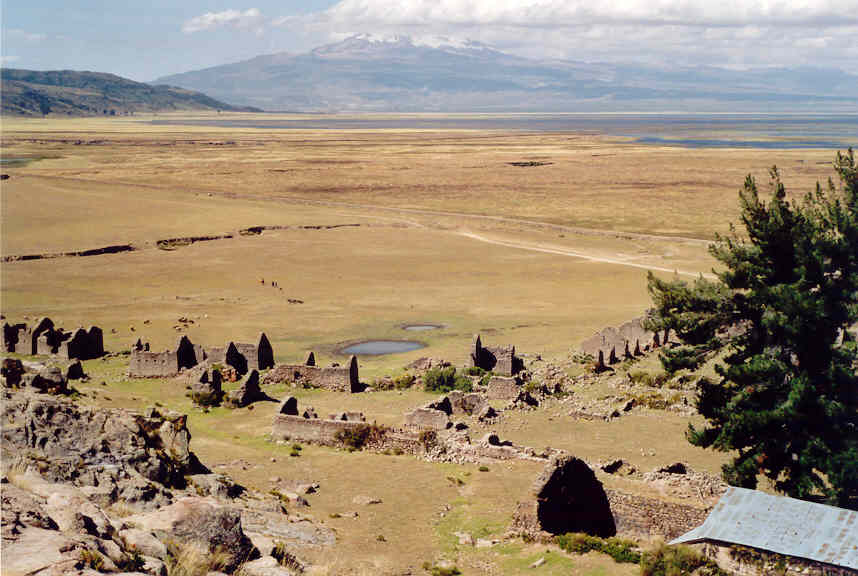
Sara Sara and Lake Parinacochas (foreground) as seen from Inka Wasi

The mountain was worshipped by local populations in and before Inca time, and the Inca performed human sacrifices on it. During Inca times it was part of the Kuntisuyu province.

According to the writings of a cleric Cristóbal de Albornoz, who beginning in 1570 wrote about local religious practices, the local population considered Sara Sara a sacred mountain and offered gold, silver, animals and servants to it. In 1996, archaeologists discovered a burial in a collapsed structure just northeast of the summit and recovered a body. This mummy was nicknamed "Sarita" and appears to be a 15-year old girl. It was accompanied by the remnants of offerings and the ice surrounding the body had melted. Additional offerings such as a llama and a silver object were also recovered from the summit.

Stone walls are found on the ridge at the summit of Sara Sara. They were initially described in 1982 by the archeologist Johan Reinhard, who described them on the northern summit. In 1941, copper objects were found on its flanks. The Yanapunku cave at 5,000 metres (16,000 ft) elevation features bones and ceramics from the Inca and Wari cultures. Incaptiana is a site at the top of a hill at 4,565 metres (14,977 ft) elevation where Inca buildings were identified.

== See also ==
- Inka Wasi
- List of volcanoes in Peru
