= Department of Ayacucho =

Department of Peru

Coordinates: 13°09′47″S 74°13′28″W

Ayacucho Ayakuchu (Quechua)
- Department
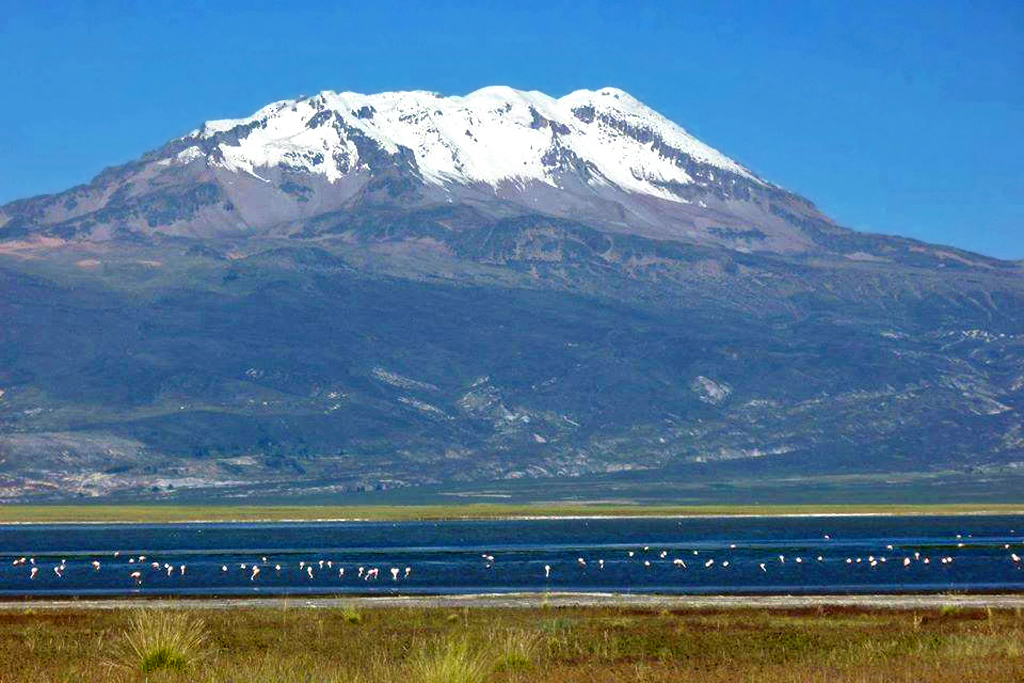
- Sara Sara and Lake Parinacochas

- Flag Coat of arms

- Location of Ayacucho within Peru
- Country: Peru
- Established: April 26, 1822
- Capital: Ayacucho
- Provinces: List: Cangallo; Huamanga; Huanca Sancos; Huanta; La Mar; Lucanas; Parinacochas; Paucar del Sara Sara; Sucre; Víctor Fajardo; Vilcas Huamán

Government
  - Type: Regional Government
  - Governor: Wilfredo Oscorima Núñez

Area
  - Total: 43,814.8 km^{2} (16,917.0 sq mi)
- Elevation (Capital): 2,746 m (9,009 ft)
- Highest elevation: 5,505 m (18,061 ft)
- Lowest elevation: 1,800 m (5,900 ft)

Population (2025 census)
  - Total: 709,570
  - Density: 16.195/km^{2} (41.944/sq mi)
- Demonym: ayacuchano/a
- UBIGEO: 05
- Dialing code: 066
- ISO 3166 code: PE-AYA
- Principal resources: Potatoes, wheat, olluco, barley, sheep and handicrafts.
- Poverty rate: 72.5%
- Percentage of Peru's GDP: 0.65%
- Website: www.gra.regionayacucho.gob.pe

Ayacucho (Spanish pronunciation: [aʝaˈkutʃo]; Quechua: Ayakuchu), known as Huamanga (Quechua: Wamanqa) from its creation in 1822 until 1825, is a department of Peru. It is located in the south-central Andes of the country. The region was one of the hardest hit in the 1980s during the guerrilla war waged by Shining Path. It is administered by a regional government. Its capital is the city of Ayacucho.

== History ==
The department was created by the Reglamento Provisional de Elecciones, published on April 26, 1822, which established the department of Huamanga alongside those of Arequipa, Cuzco, Huancavelica and Puno.

A referendum was held on 30 October 2005, in order to decide whether the department would merge with the departments of Ica and Huancavelica to form the new Ica-Ayacucho-Huancavelica Region, as part of the decentralization process in Peru. The proposal failed and no merger was carried out.

== Political division ==
Map of provinces

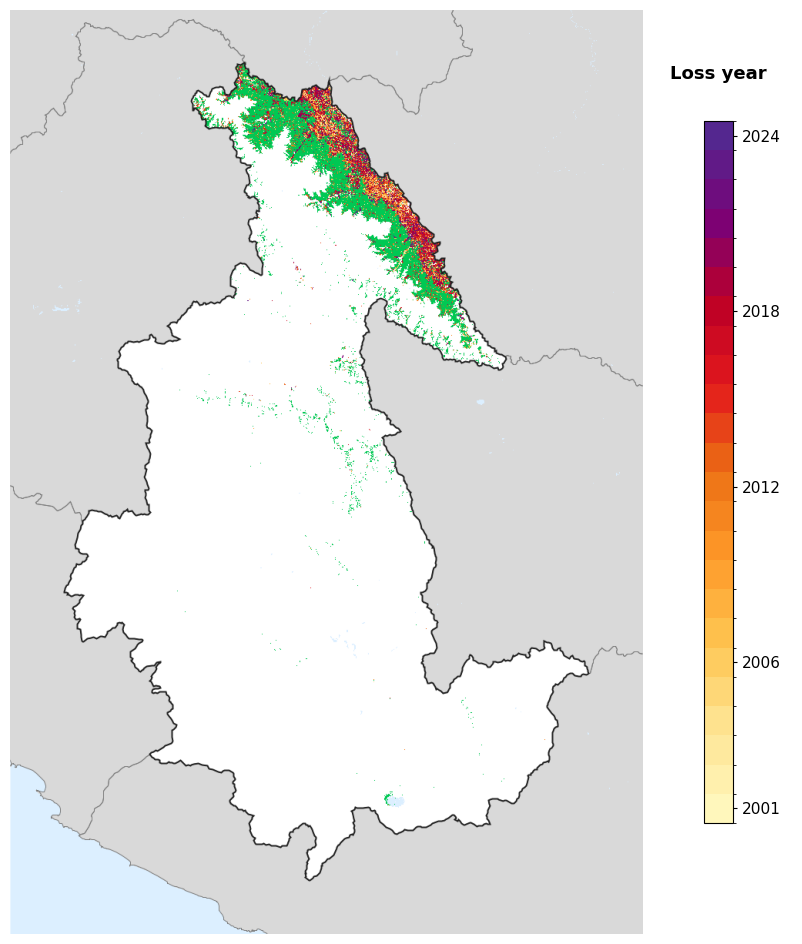
Tree-cover loss year in Ayacucho, 2001-2024, from the Global Forest Change dataset.

The department is divided into 11 provinces (Spanish: provincias, singular: provincia), which are composed of 111 districts (distritos, singular: distrito).

=== Provinces ===
The provinces, with their capitals in parentheses, are:

1. Cangallo (Cangallo)
2. Huamanga (Ayacucho)
3. Huanca Sancos (Huanca Sancos)
4. Huanta (Huanta)
5. La Mar (San Miguel)
6. Lucanas (Puquio)
7. Parinacochas (Coracora)
8. Paucar del Sara Sara (Pausa)
9. Sucre (Querobamba)
10. Víctor Fajardo (Huancapi)
11. Vilcas Huamán (Vilcas Huamán)

== Demographics ==
=== Population growth ===
Census year	Population
1981	523,821
1993	512,438
2007	588,641
2017	650,940
2025	709,570

=== Languages ===
According to the 2007 Peru Census, the language learnt first by most of the residents was Quechua (63.05%) followed by Spanish (36.57%). The Quechua variety spoken in Ayacucho is Chanka Quechua. The following table shows the results concerning the language learnt first in the department by province:

Province	Quechua	Aymara	Asháninka	Another native language	Spanish	Foreign language	Deaf or mute	Total
Cangallo	29,356	24	4	11	3,132	3	37	32,567
Huamanga	104,644	223	42	118	102,452	72	218	207,769
Huanca Sancos	8,017	29	1	-	1,858	-	18	9,923
Huanta	58,333	89	92	40	28,184	5	105	86,848
La Mar	64,815	64	127	58	12,950	1	111	78,126
Lucanas	26,153	152	7	49	35,282	10	78	61,731
Parinacochas	15,491	68	-	30	12,576	2	29	28,196
Paucar del Sara Sara	5,223	19	1	15	5,140	-	16	10,414
Sucre	9,059	25	-	-	2,749	-	13	11,846
Víctor Fajardo	20,647	37	2	9	3,213	-	38	23,946
Vilcas Huaman	19,884	14	2	11	2,232	1	44	22,188
Total	361,622	744	278	341	209,768	94	707	573,554
%	63.05	0.13	0.05	0.06	36.57	0.02	0.12	100.00

== Gallery ==
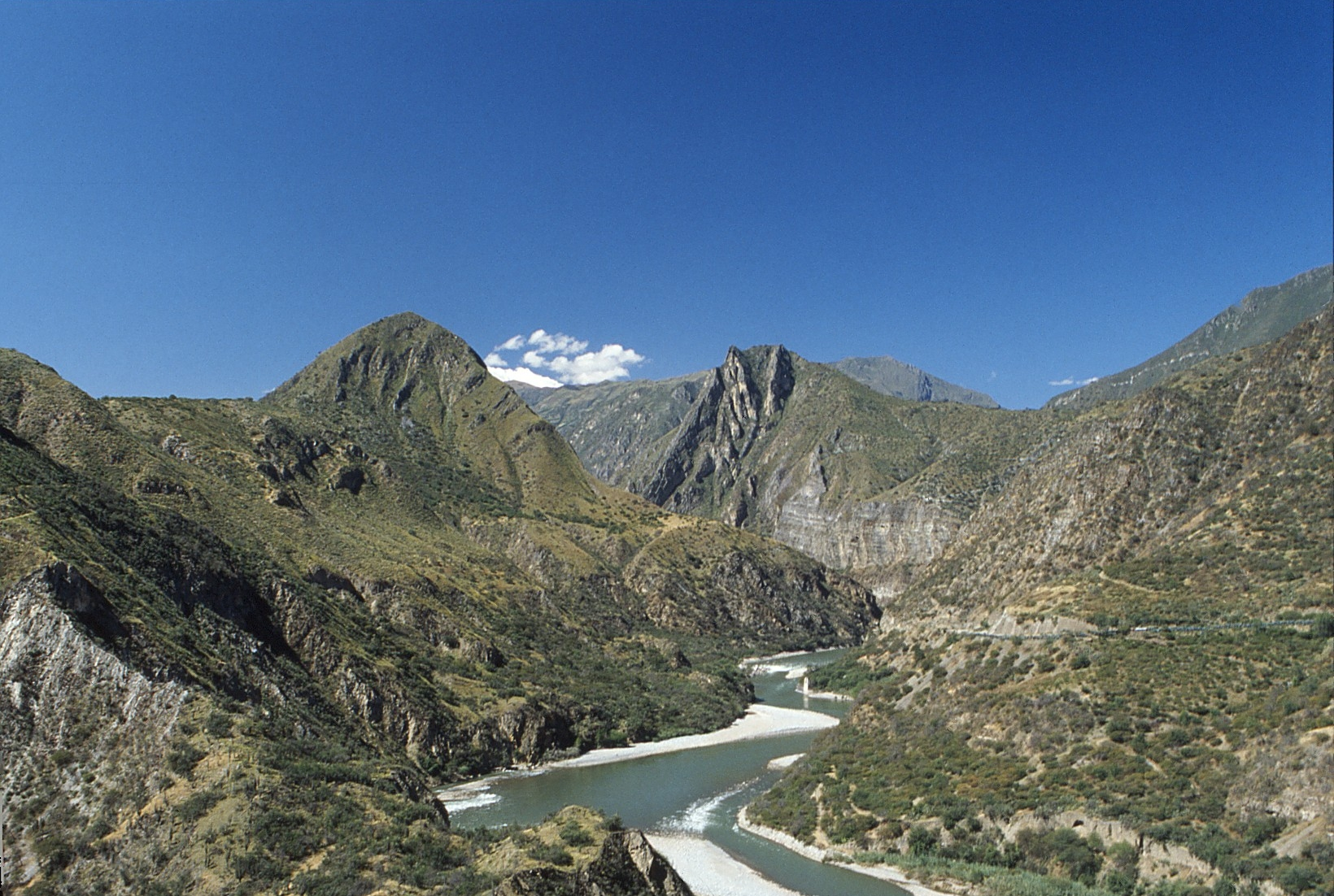
The Andes go across the Ayacucho Region

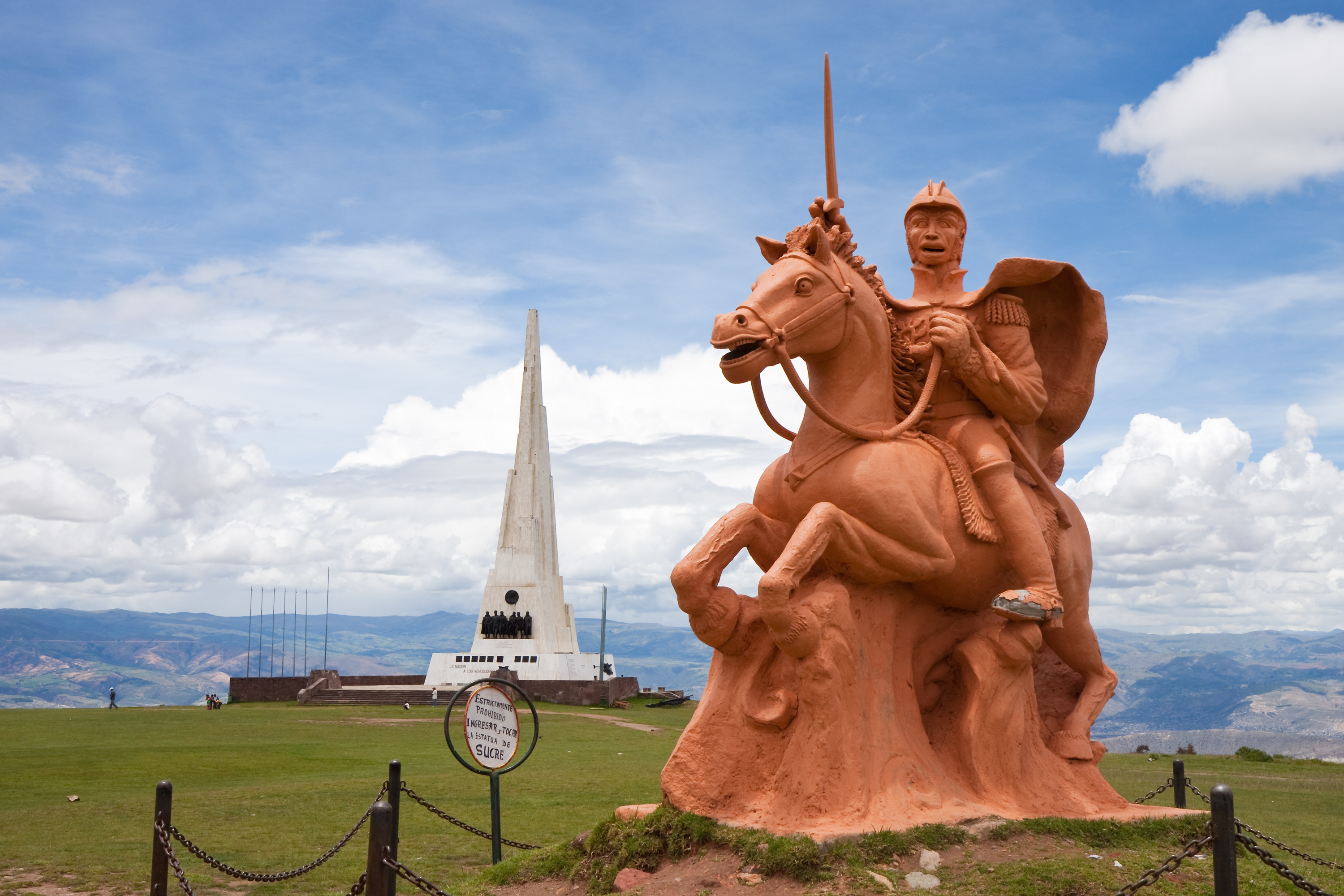
Statue of Antonio José de Sucre and obelisk near Kinwa, commemorating the Battle of Ayacucho.

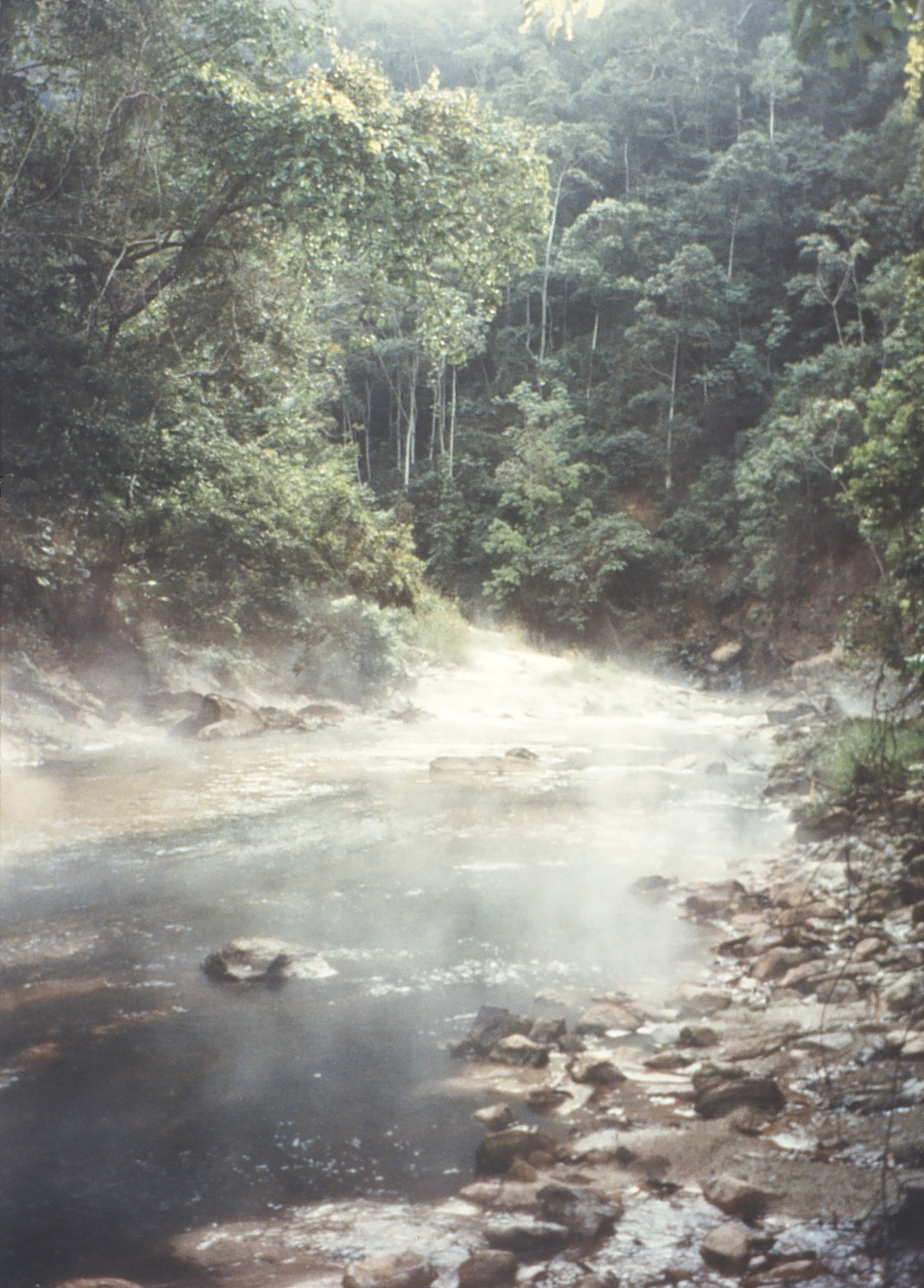
Hot springs in the region of Ayacucho.

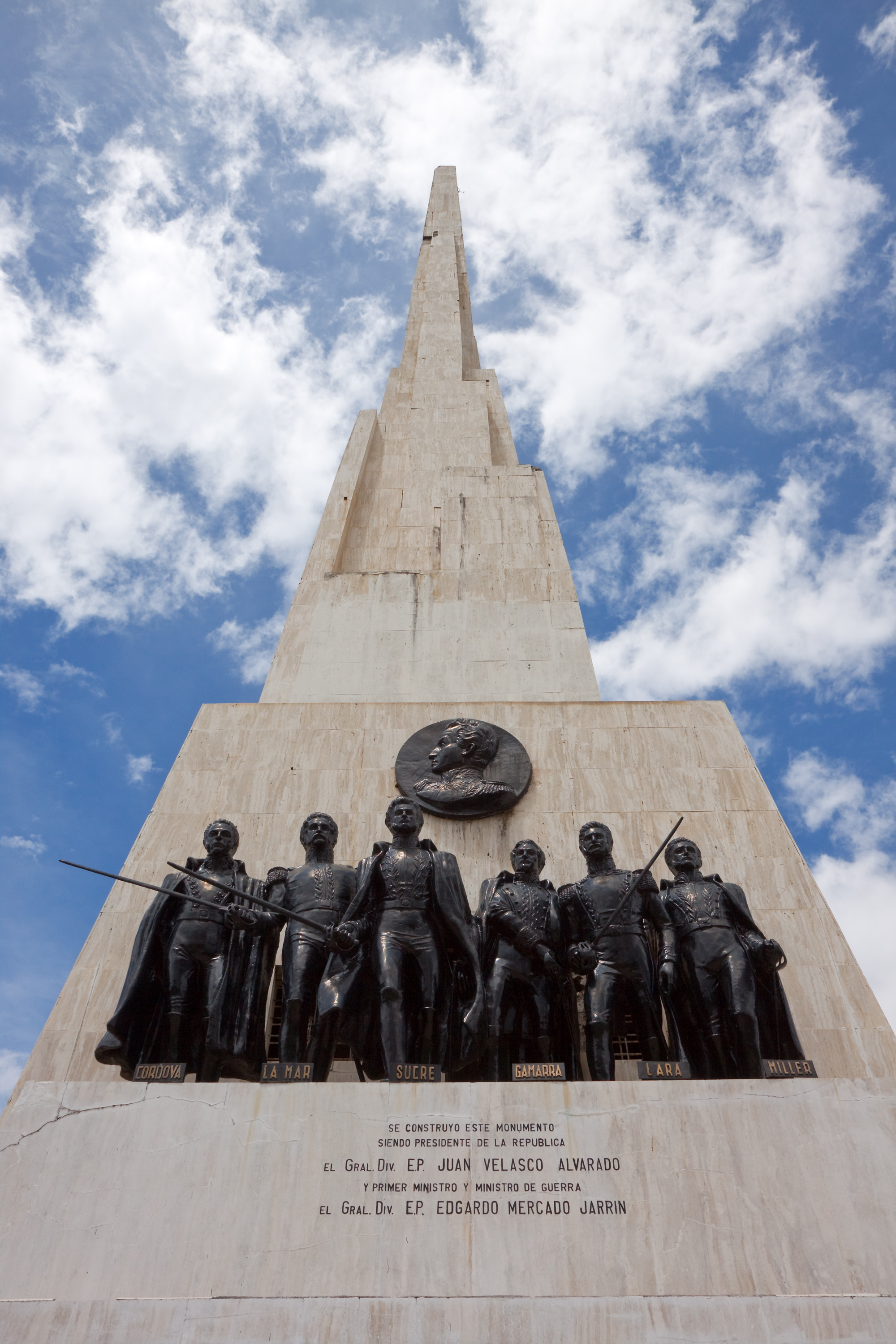
Obelisk near Kinwa, commemorating the Battle of Ayacucho.

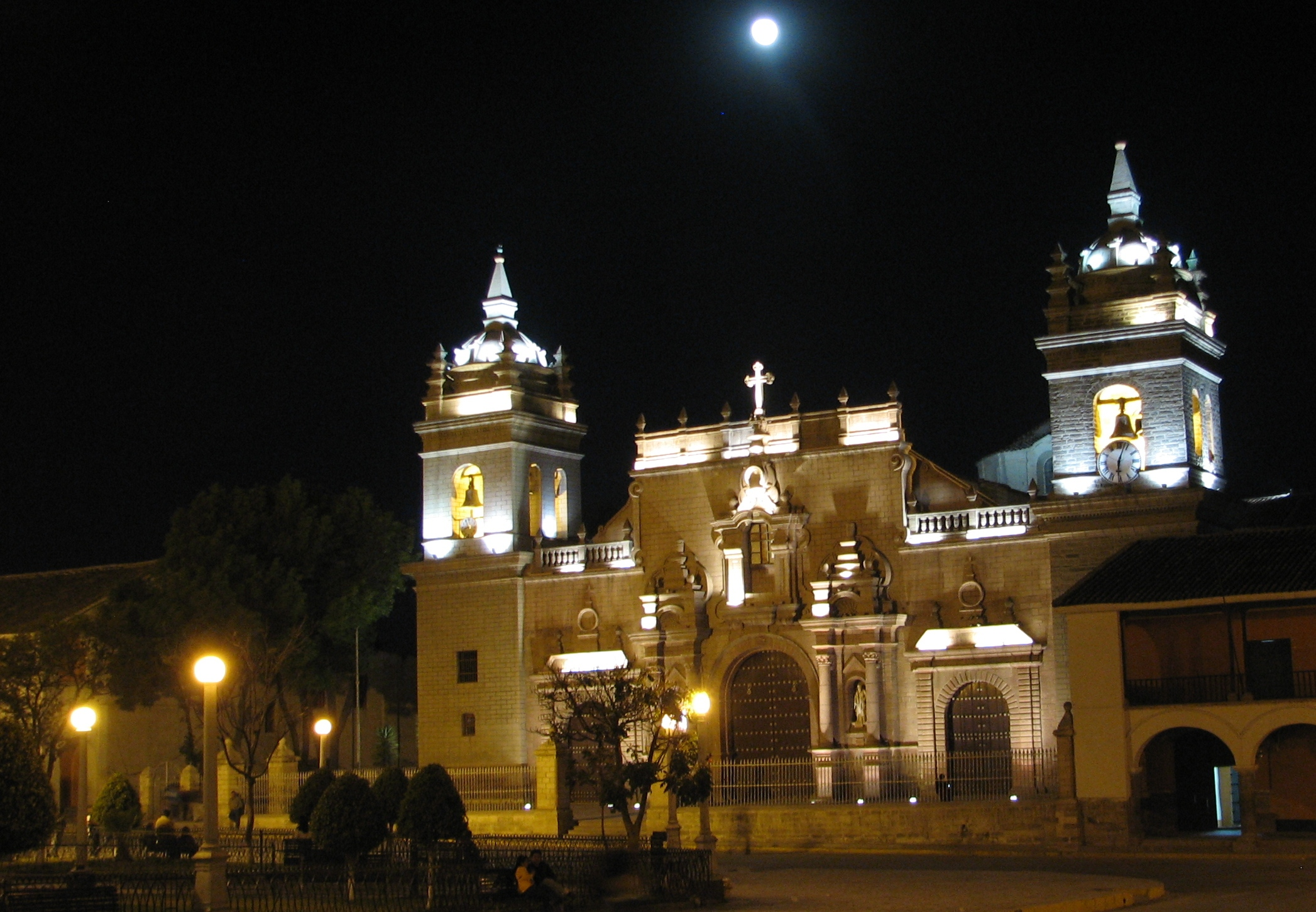
Church of Ayacucho
