= Inka Raqay =

Inka Raqay or Inkaraqay (Quechua Inka Inca, raqay ruin, a demolished building; shed, storehouse or dormitory for the laborers of a farm; a generally old building without roof, only with walls, also spelled Inca Racay, Inka Racay, Inka Raccay, Inca Raccay, Incaracay, Incaraccay, Incarracay, ) may refer to:

- Inka Raqay, Apurímac, an archaeological site in the Apurímac Region, Peru
- Inka Raqay, Ayacucho, an archaeological site in the Ayacucho Region, Peru
- Inka Raqay, Bolivia, an archaeological site in the Cochabamba Department, Bolivia
