= Pichari =

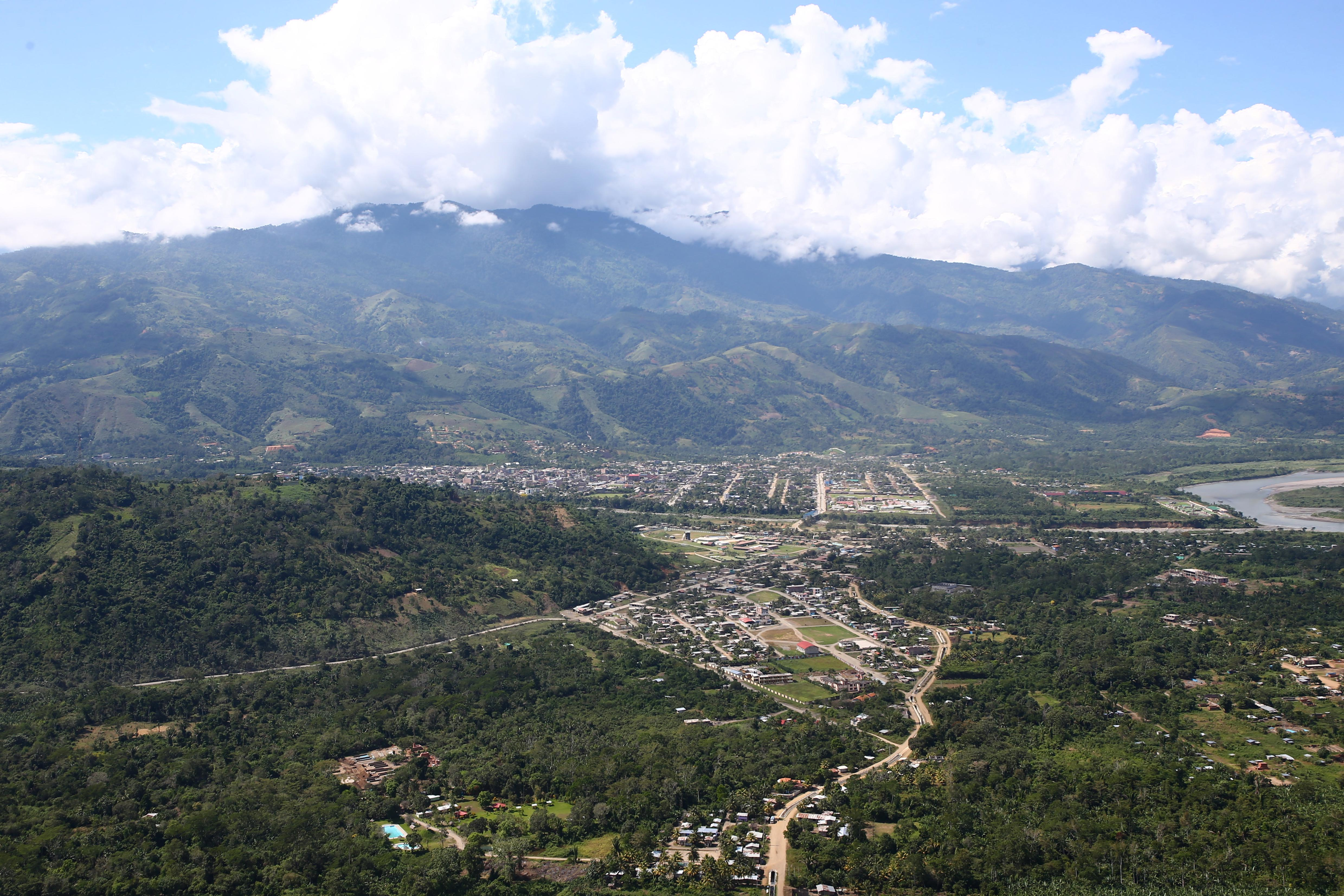

- Location within Peru
- Coordinates: 12°31′13″S 73°49′41″W
- Country: Peru
- Region: Cusco Region
- Province: La Convención Province
- District: Pichari District

Pichari is a town in central Peru, capital of the Pichari District, La Convención Province, Cusco Region. It is situated on the east side of the Apurímac River, only about 3 km from the town of Sivia, capital of the Sivia District in Huanta Province, Ayacucho Region, on the other side of the river.

The town is located in the largest coca-growing valley in Peru. There is also an army base there.
