= San Pedro de Larcay District =

Coordinates: 14°41′38″S 74°07′27″W

San Pedro de Larcay Larq'ay
- District
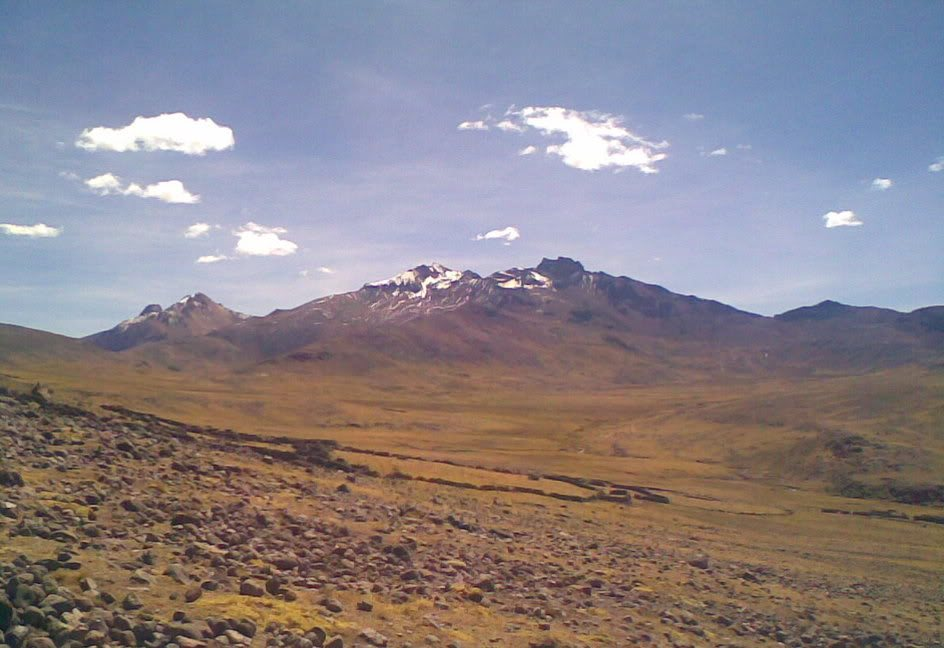
- Qarwarasu

- Location of San Pedro de Larcay in the Sucre province
- Country: Peru
- Region: Ayacucho
- Province: Sucre
- Founded: July 8, 1964
- Capital: San Pedro de Larcay
- Subdivisions: 25 populated places

Area
  - Total: 310.07 km^{2} (119.72 sq mi)
- Elevation: 3,376 m (11,076 ft)

Population (2005 census)
  - Total: 1,175
  - Density: 3.789/km^{2} (9.815/sq mi)
- Time zone: UTC-5 (PET)
- UBIGEO: 050908
- Website: cuspel.pe/es/sanpedrodelarcay

San Pedro de Larcay is one of 11 districts of the Sucre Province in the Ayacucho region in Peru.

== Administrative division ==
The populated places in the district are:

- San Pedro de Larcay
- Wallacha
- Chicha (San Pablo de Chicha)
- fundo Curita
- Saywa
- Hueccopampa
- Ccehuani
- Sura Sura (San Martín de Porras de Sora Sora)
- Huacuylla
- Q'ara Q'ara
- Huascoto
- Cuchallo
- Susuma
- Rumiwasi
- Ccotaccua
- Cuchopampamnjkhob
- Rayusqa
- Liapucro
- Cullupallcca
- Puka Corral
- Sairosa
- Hatun Urqu
- Ccerencha
- sicuani
- Chuñunchana
- Ccaccentalla

== Population ==
The population of San Pedro de Larcay (2005 census) is 1,175 people, 600 men and 575 women.

== See also ==
- Qarwarasu
