= Marayniyoq =

Archaeological site in Peru

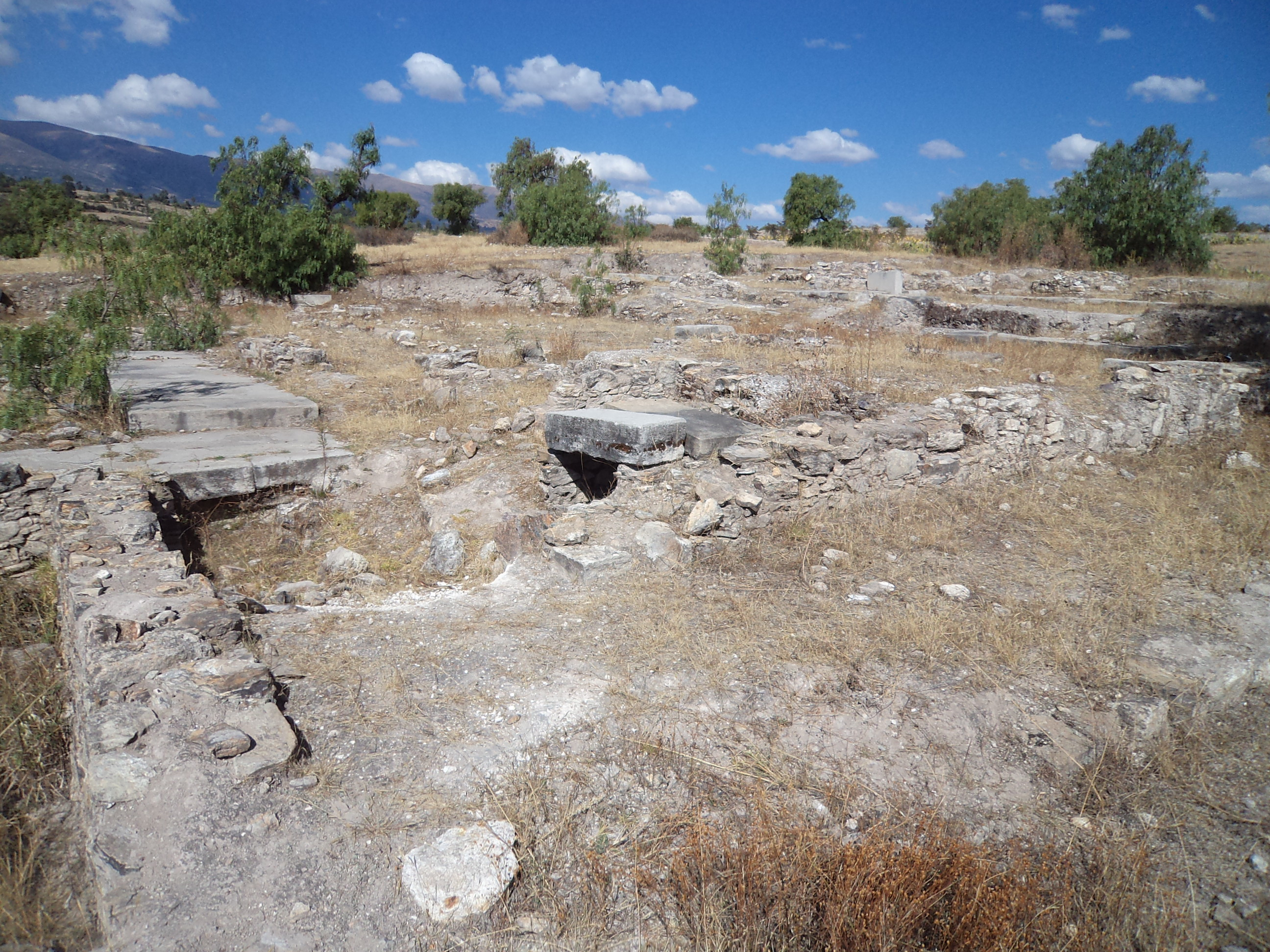
- View of Marayniyoq
- Interactive map of Marayniyoq
- Cultures: Wari
- Location: Ayacucho Region, Peru
- Region: Andes

Marayniyoq or Marayniyoc (possibly from Quechua maran, maray batan or grindstone, maray to tear down, to knock down) is an archaeological site in the region of Ayacucho in Peru. It lies southeast of the town of Huanta and southwest of Huamanguilla at the border of the Huanta Province, Huamanguilla District and the Huamanga Province, Pacaycasa District in a plain called Vega Pampa. It is considered a Wari site.

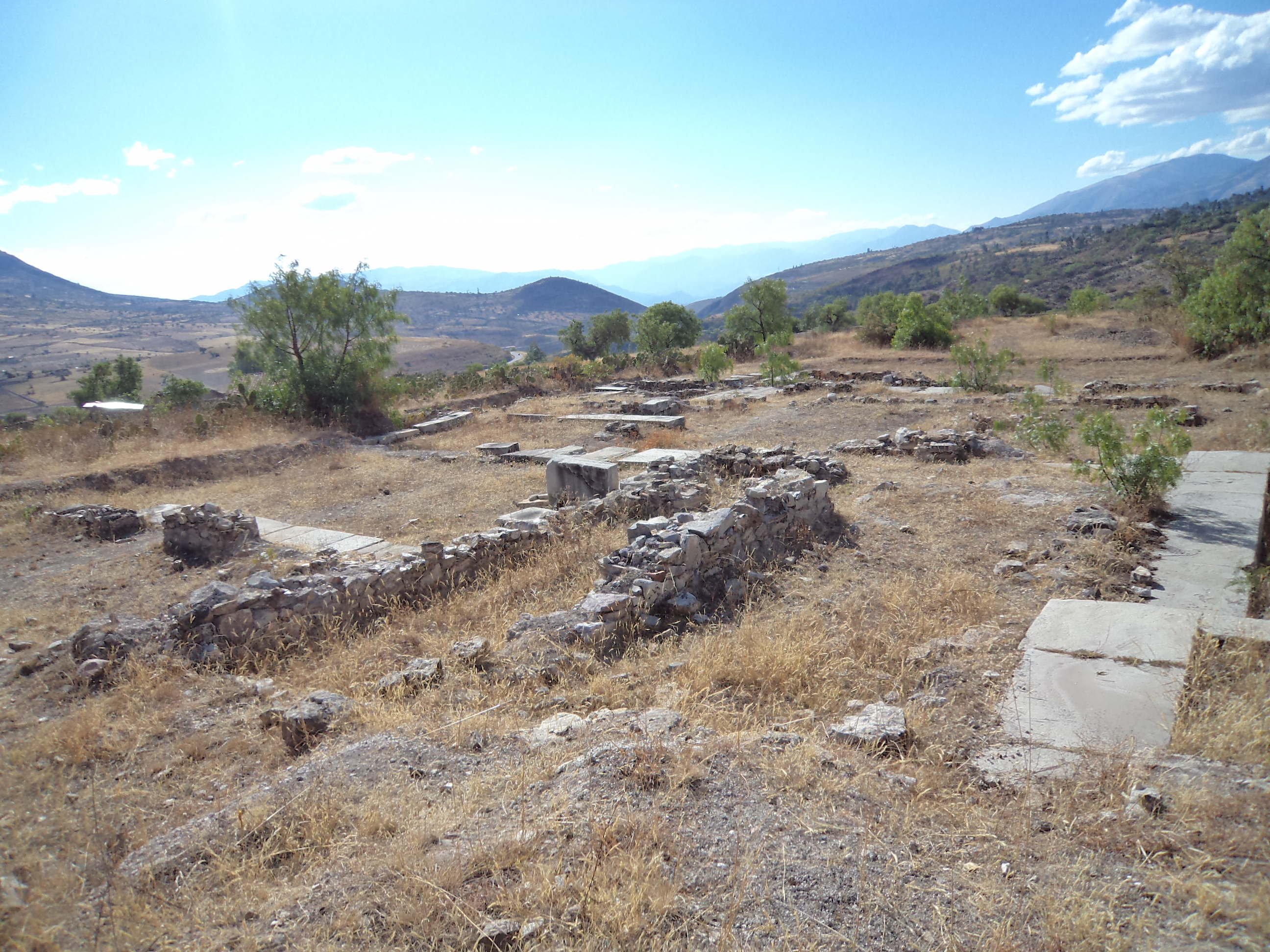

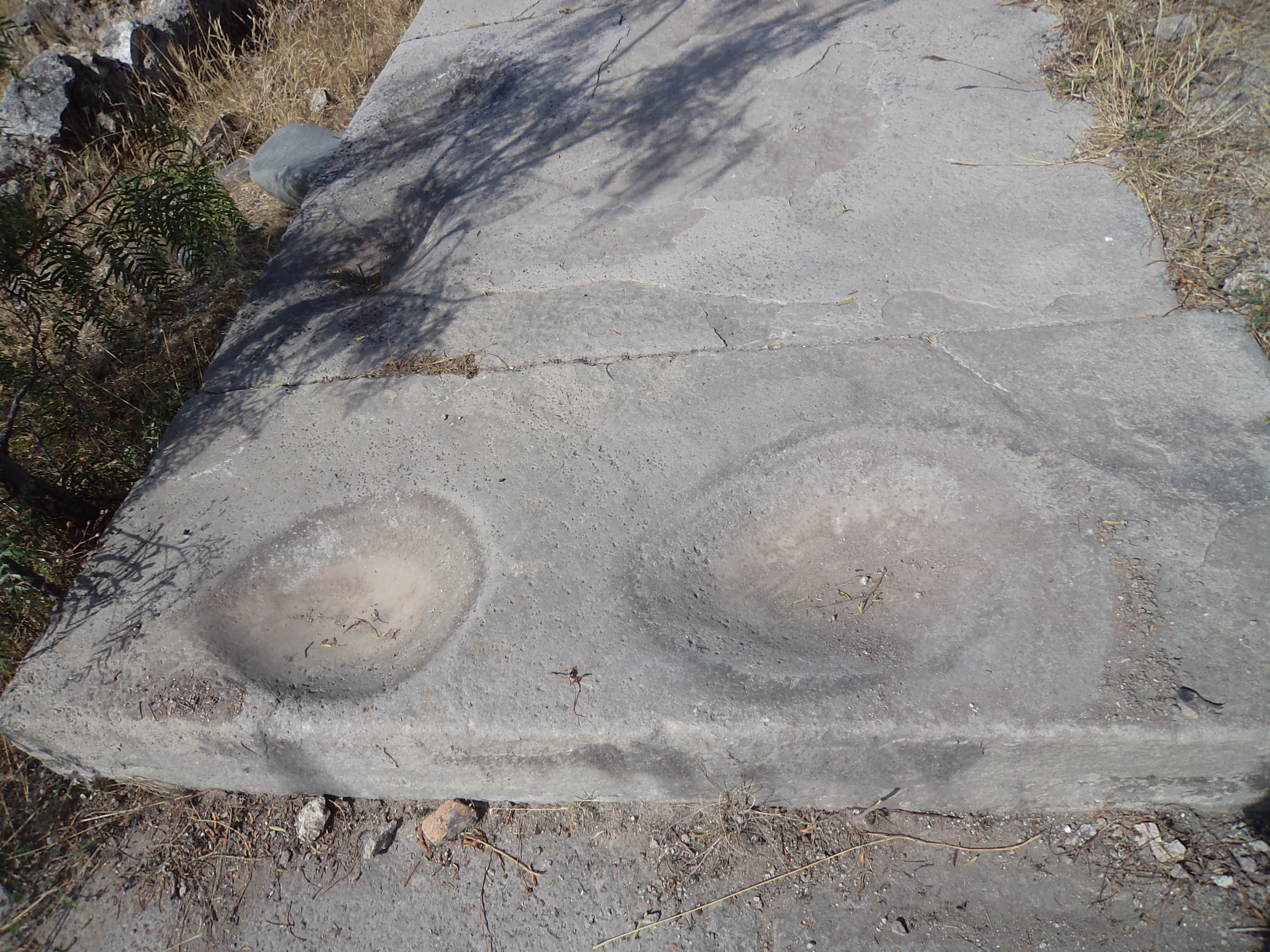

== See also ==
- Pikimachay
- Yanaqucha
