= Sivia =

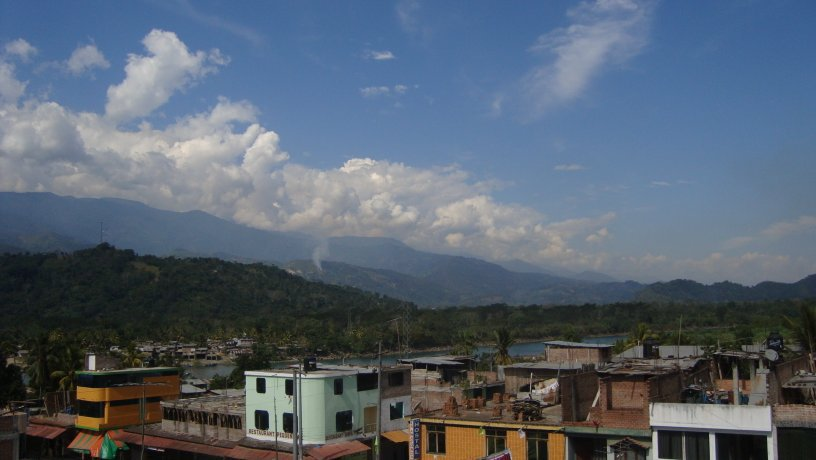

- Location within Peru
- Coordinates: 12°30′45″S 73°51′28″W
- Country: Peru
- Region: Ayacucho Region
- Province: Huanta Province
- District: Sivia District

Sivia is a town in central Peru, capital of the Sivia District in Huanta Province, Ayacucho Region. It is on the west bank of the Apurímac River, about 3 km (1.9 mi) from the town of Pichari, capital of the Pichari District, La Convención Province, Cusco Region, on the other side of the river. Both towns are in the zone known as the Valley of the Apurímac and Ene River (Valle de los Ríos Apurímac y Ene, or VRAE). The VRAE is an area of such high childhood malnutrition and poverty that the government of Peru selected the VRAE to launch its National Strategy for Growth program in 2007. The VRAE is a major center of coca production.
