= Rasuwillka (Huanta-La Mar) =

Mountain in Peru

- Location within Peru

Highest point
- Elevation: 4,800 m (15,700 ft)
- Coordinates: 12°52′10″S 74°09′22″W

Geography
- Location: Peru, Ayacucho Region
- Parent range: Andes

Rasuwillka (Quechua, Hispanicized spellings Rasohuilca, Rasuvilca, Razohuilca, Razuhuilca, Razuhuillca, Razuwillka, Rasu Bilca, Rasu Willca, Razu Bilca) is a mountain in the Andes of Peru, about 4,800 metres (15,748 ft) high. It is situated in the Ayacucho Region, Huanta Province, Huanta District, and in the La Mar Province, Tambo District. Rasuwillka lies north of the lakes Muruqucha, Pampaqucha, and Yanaqucha and northeast of Chakaqucha.

By the local peasants Rasuwillka is venerated as an apu.
