= Juan Arias Díaz =

Spanish explorer and mineral prospector

Juan Arias Díaz, also known as Juan Arias Diaz Topete, was a Spanish explorer and mineral prospector. He is credited with being the first European to visit the Incan city of Choquequirao, which he visited in 1710. However, it has been proposed that Spanish conquistadors arrived first during their war against Manco Inca. He allegedly found the city when he was resting his mules after a prospecting trek. He described it as "an ancient town of heathen times" known to the natives as "The Cradle of Gold". He led three expeditions to the town, finding a total of four sites, the three others of which have not been identified. His records of Choquequirao inspired American explorer Hiram Bingham III to search for the city.
