= Pampaqucha (Ayacucho) =

Lake in Peru

- Location within Peru
- Location: Peru; Ayacucho Region
- Coordinates: 12°54′45″S 74°09′14″W
- Surface elevation: 4,600 m (15,100 ft)

Pampaqucha (Quechua pampa a large plain, qucha lake, hispanicized spellings Pampaccocha, Pampacocha) or Rasuwillka is a lake in Peru located in the Ayacucho Region, Huanta Province, Huanta District. It is situated at a height of about 4,600 metres (15,092 ft). Pampaqucha lies south of the mountains named Rasuwillka and Quriwariwayrana (Corihuarihuairana) and Chakaqucha, southwest of Yanaqucha and northwest of Muruqucha. The nearest village is Qurpakancha (Corpacancha).

A little perennial stream connects the lakes named Yanaqucha and Pampaqucha and flows to the southwest. Upstream it is called Pampaqucha. After the confluence with the stream named Chakaqucha it changes its name to Huanta River. The river flows to Kachimayu as a right affluent.
