= Morcolla District =

Coordinates: 14°41′38″S 74°07′27″W

Morcolla
- District
- Location of Morcolla in the Sucre province
- Country: Peru
- Region: Ayacucho
- Province: Sucre
- Founded: December 21, 1956
- Capital: Morcolla
- Subdivisions: 31 populated places

Area
  - Total: 289.34 km^{2} (111.71 sq mi)
- Elevation: 3,459 m (11,348 ft)

Population (2005 census)
  - Total: 2,190
  - Density: 7.57/km^{2} (19.6/sq mi)
- Time zone: UTC-5 (PET)
- UBIGEO: 050906

Morcolla is one of 11 districts of the Sucre Province in the Ayacucho region in Peru.

== Population ==
The population of Morcolla is 2,190 people, 1,088 men and 1,102 women.

== Geography ==
One of the highest peaks of the district is Rasuwillka at approximately 5,000 m (16,000 ft). Other mountains are listed below:

- Apu Pumani
- Chillwa Chillwa
- Iskulla
- Kunturisa
- K'ark'ani
- Murqulla Urqu
- Pallqa Urqu
- Pallqacha
- Pata Wasi
- Puka Qaqa
- Pukarilla
- Qalalu
- Qucha Urqu
- Q'ala Pukyu
- Q'illu Q'illu
- Sinaqa Sinqa
- T'akra Silla
- Waychawlla
- Yana Yana
- Yawyu

== Ethnic groups ==
The people in the district are mainly indigenous citizens of Quechua descent. Quechua is the language which the majority of the population (85.58%) learnt to speak in childhood, 14.22% of the residents started speaking using the Spanish language (2007 Peru Census).

== Administrative division ==
The populated places in the district are:

- Morcolla
- Tintay
- Checc-Chuy
- Ccotoysa
- Ccampoya
- Tambo
- Jatun Huerta
- Cucho-Cucho
- Carancani
- Curacuracha
- San Isidro de Ccocha
- Pinco Calla
- Lauje
- Ccantoni
- Huaco
- Ccaccencora
- Yanapaccha
- Puchuma
- Euquicho
- Pampa Minas
- Ccesacce
- Volcan de Ccarhuarazo
- Lunco
- Asnaccocha
- Runa Runa
- Pachacalla
- Millhuata
- Tastani
- Eseccocha
- Amaroyuq
- Tayapucro
