= Santiago de Paucaray District =

Coordinates: 14°41′38.21″S 74°07′26.88″W

Santiago de Paucaray
- District
- Location of Santiago de Paucaray in the Sucre province
- Country: Peru
- Region: Ayacucho
- Province: Sucre
- Founded: May 21, 1962
- Capital: Santiago de Paucaray
- Subdivisions: 12 populated places

Area
  - Total: 62.65 km^{2} (24.19 sq mi)
- Elevation: 3,229 m (10,594 ft)

Population (2005 census)
  - Total: 1,030
  - Density: 16.4/km^{2} (42.6/sq mi)
- Time zone: UTC-5 (PET)
- UBIGEO: 050910

Santiago de Paucaray is one of 11 districts of the Sucre Province in the Ayacucho region in Peru.

== Population ==
The population of Santiago de Paucaray (2005 census) is 1,030 people, 495 men and 535 women.

== Ethnic groups ==
The people in the district are mainly indigenous citizens of Quechua descent. Quechua is the language which the majority of the population (84.16%) learnt to speak in childhood, 15.84% of the residents started speaking using the Spanish language (2007 Peru Census).

== Administrative division ==
The populated places in the district are:

- Santiago de Paucaray
- Autama
- Chaquiccocha
- pampa Estancia
- Ccallhuaniso
- Ccotani
- Atihuara
- Matara
- Santa Rosa de Ccara Ccara
- Chullhua
- Hauytarumi
- Parhuanca

== Climate ==
Climate data for Santiago de Paucaray, elevation 3,232 m (10,604 ft), (1991–2020)
Month	Jan	Feb	Mar	Apr	May	Jun	Jul	Aug	Sep	Oct	Nov	Dec	Year
Mean daily maximum °C (°F)	20.2 (68.4)	19.5 (67.1)	19.2 (66.6)	20.1 (68.2)	20.8 (69.4)	20.4 (68.7)	20.2 (68.4)	20.9 (69.6)	21.6 (70.9)	22.3 (72.1)	22.9 (73.2)	21.2 (70.2)	20.8 (69.4)
Mean daily minimum °C (°F)	7.9 (46.2)	8.1 (46.6)	8.1 (46.6)	7.4 (45.3)	5.6 (42.1)	4.8 (40.6)	4.2 (39.6)	4.9 (40.8)	6.2 (43.2)	6.8 (44.2)	7.0 (44.6)	7.7 (45.9)	6.6 (43.8)
Average precipitation mm (inches)	153.7 (6.05)	155.8 (6.13)	134.6 (5.30)	50.5 (1.99)	7.5 (0.30)	7.6 (0.30)	13.1 (0.52)	16.4 (0.65)	24.0 (0.94)	33.9 (1.33)	40.7 (1.60)	100.7 (3.96)	738.5 (29.07)
Source: National Meteorology and Hydrology Service of Peru
