= Mulinuyuq =

Archaeological site in Peru

- Location: Peru, Ayacucho Region
- Region: Andes

Mulinuyuq (Quechua mulinu mill or swirl (a borrowing from Spanish molino or remolino), -yuq a suffix to indicate ownership, "the one with a mill (or mills)" or "the one with a swirl (or swirls)", also spelled Molinoyoc) is an archaeological site in the Ayacucho Region in Peru. It is located in the Huanta Province.
