= Querobamba District =

Coordinates: 14°41′38″S 74°07′27″W

Querobamba Qirupampa
- District
- Location of Querobamba in the Sucre province
- Country: Peru
- Region: Ayacucho
- Province: Sucre
- Capital: Querobamba
- Subdivisions: 26 populated places

Area
  - Total: 275.65 km^{2} (106.43 sq mi)
- Elevation: 3,502 m (11,490 ft)

Population (2005 census)
  - Total: 2,737
  - Density: 9.929/km^{2} (25.72/sq mi)
- Time zone: UTC-5 (PET)
- UBIGEO: 050901

Querobamba is one of 11 districts of the Sucre Province in the Ayacucho region in Peru.

== Population ==
The population of Querobamba (2005 census) is 2,737 people, 1,370 men and 1,367 women.

== Ethnic groups ==
The people in the district are mainly indigenous citizens of Quechua descent. Quechua is the language which the majority of the population (65.32%) learnt to speak in childhood, 34.00 % of the residents started speaking using the Spanish language (2007 Peru Census).

== Administrative division ==
The populated places in the district are:

- Qirupampa
- Santa Rosa de Huanchos
- Icatita
- Yanaqucha
- Chinchi
- Tinkuq
- Huicsi
- Huancoire
- Cayhua
- Soccosucho
- Puma
- Platero Pata
- Chunta
- Chuqipampa
- Mitapampa
- Chawpimayu
- Qullqapampa
- Chunaya
- Qullpa
- Icatita Nuevo
- Lloccepata
- Pucaaccay
- Tomacucho
- Comun
- Cabracancha
- Cacta
