= Soras District =

Coordinates: 14°41′38″S 74°07′27″W

Soras
- District
- Location of Soras in the Sucre province
- Country: Peru
- Region: Ayacucho
- Province: Sucre
- Founded: January 2, 1857
- Capital: Soras
- Subdivisions: 28 populated places

Area
  - Total: 357.97 km^{2} (138.21 sq mi)
- Elevation: 3,462 m (11,358 ft)

Population (2005 census)
  - Total: 1,326
  - Density: 3.704/km^{2} (9.594/sq mi)
- Time zone: UTC-5 (PET)
- UBIGEO: 050911

Soras is one of 11 districts of the Sucre Province in the Ayacucho region in Peru.

== History ==
Soras district was the location of one of the largest massacres by the Shining Path terrorist group, which took place on 16 July 1984. In total, 117 people were murdered.

== Population ==
The population of Soras (2005 census) is 1,326 people, 639 men and 687 women.

== Ethnic groups ==
The people in the district are mainly indigenous citizens of Quechua descent. Quechua is the language which the majority of the population (64.39%) learnt to speak in childhood, 35.18% of the residents started speaking using the Spanish language (2007 Peru Census).

== Administrative division ==
The populated places in the district are:

- Soras
- Occoroyocc
- Cascajal
- Ccerincha
- Tranca
- Timpocc
- Chichucancha
- Ccoñani
- Pallqacha
- Putacca
- José Paccari
- Parecca
- Yacutay
- Pukawasi
- Chawpiwasi
- Doce Corral
- Rumisunto
- Quesera
- Hacienda
- Hillacha
- Cceccño
- Taccra Pata
- Allpachaka
- Soytocco
- Humasa
- Uchuy Ccoñanicha
- Yuracc Urccucha
- Ancaypahua

== See also ==
- Qarwarasu
