= Tinyaq =

Archaeological site in Peru

- Quri Willka
- Location within Peru
- 12°58′40″S 74°12′00″W
- Type: storehouses
- Cultures: Inca
- Location: Peru, Ayacucho Region
- Region: Andes

Site notes
- Height: 3,300 m (10,827 ft)

Tinyaq (also spelled Tinyacc; Quechua: tinya a kind of small frame drum, -q a nominal suffix, ), also known as Quri Willka also spelled Qoriwillka; Quechua: quri gold, willka, holy, sacred or divine, is an Inca-period archaeological site in Peru located on a mountain of the same name in the Ayacucho Region, Huanta Province, Iguain District.
