= Paico District =

Coordinates: 14°41′38″S 74°07′27″W

Paico
- District
- Location of Paico in the Sucre province
- Country: Peru
- Region: Ayacucho
- Province: Sucre
- Capital: Paico
- Subdivisions: 11 populated places

Area
  - Total: 79.65 km^{2} (30.75 sq mi)
- Elevation: 3,073 m (10,082 ft)

Population (2005 census)
  - Total: 978
  - Density: 12.3/km^{2} (31.8/sq mi)
- Time zone: UTC-5 (PET)
- UBIGEO: 050907

Paico is one of 11 districts of the Sucre Province in the Ayacucho region in Peru.

== Population ==
The population of Paico (2005 census) is 978 people, 507 men and 471 women.

== Ethnic groups ==
The people in the district are mainly indigenous citizens of Quechua descent. Quechua is the language which the majority of the population (80.74%) learnt to speak in childhood, 18.81% of the residents started speaking using the Spanish language (2007 Peru Census).

== Administrative division ==
The populated places in the district are:

- Paico
- Sihui
- Santa Cruz de Ccarmencca
- Charamarca
- Pallccapampa (Ccalluri)
- Layrata
- Anchani
- Ccochapata
- Ccasahuasi
- Analayocc
- Santarccocha
