= Aqu Urqu =

Mountain in Peru

- Location within Peru

Highest point
- Elevation: 4,600 m (15,100 ft)
- Coordinates: 14°16′36″S 73°50′45″W

Geography
- Location: Peru, Ayacucho Region, Lucanas Province, Sucre Province
- Parent range: Andes

Aqu Urqu (Quechua aqu sand, urqu mountain "sand mountain", also spelled Acco Orcco) is a mountain in the Andes of Peru, about 4,600 m (15,092 ft) high. It is located in the Ayacucho Region, Lucanas Province, Chipao District, and in the Sucre Province, Huacaña District. Two lakes named Waytaqucha and Amaruyuq lie at its feet.
