= Chalcos District =

Coordinates: 14°41′38″S 74°07′27″W

Chalcos
- District
- Location of Chalcos in the Sucre province
- Country: Peru
- Region: Ayacucho
- Province: Sucre
- Founded: April 3, 1928
- Capital: Chalcos
- Subdivisions: 12 populated places

Area
  - Total: 58.43 km^{2} (22.56 sq mi)
- Elevation: 3,645 m (11,959 ft)

Population (2005 census)
  - Total: 748
  - Density: 12.8/km^{2} (33.2/sq mi)
- Time zone: UTC-5 (PET)
- UBIGEO: 050903

Chalcos is one of 11 districts of the Sucre Province in the Ayacucho region in Peru.

== Population ==
The population of Chalcos is 748 people, 376 men and 372 women.

== Ethnic groups ==
The people in the district are mainly indigenous citizens of Quechua descent. Quechua is the language which the majority of the population (81.70%) learnt to speak in childhood, 18.16% of the residents started speaking using the Spanish language (2007 Peru Census).

== Administrative division ==
The populated places in the district are:

- Chalcos
- Urpayhuasi
- Camapuyo
- Corral Pata
- Huasacapo
- Pueblo Nuevo
- Ccochanccay
- Pamparca
- Chuncuni
- Tranca
- Illahuasi
- Ayalca Ankara
