= Huamanguilla District =

Coordinates: 13°00′40″S 74°10′24″W

Huamanguilla
- District
- Interactive map of Huamanguilla
- Country: Peru
- Region: Ayacucho
- Province: Huanta
- Capital: Huamanguilla

Government
  - Mayor: Juan Rolando Pacheco Huamanrimachi

Area
  - Total: 88.03 km^{2} (33.99 sq mi)
- Elevation: 3,276 m (10,748 ft)

Population (2005 census)
  - Total: 4,812
  - Density: 54.66/km^{2} (141.6/sq mi)
- Time zone: UTC-5 (PET)
- UBIGEO: 050403

Huamanguilla District is one of eight districts of the province Huanta in Peru.

== Ethnic groups ==
The people in the district are mainly indigenous citizens of Quechua descent. Quechua is the language which the majority of the population (86.27%) learnt to speak in childhood, 13.39% of the residents started speaking using the Spanish language (2007 Peru Census).

== Places of interest ==
The archaeological site of Marayniyuq lies in the southwest of the district.

== See also ==
- Kunturmarka
- Yanaqucha
