= Iguain District =

Coordinates: 12.9925°S 74.2120°W

Iguain
- District
- Interactive map of Iguain
- Country: Peru
- Region: Ayacucho
- Province: Huanta
- Founded: December 27, 1926
- Capital: Macachacra

Government
  - Mayor: Fidel Canales Huayllasco

Area
  - Total: 74.85 km^{2} (28.90 sq mi)
- Elevation: 3,025 m (9,925 ft)

Population (2005 census)
  - Total: 3,034
  - Density: 40.53/km^{2} (105.0/sq mi)
- Time zone: UTC-5 (PET)
- UBIGEO: 050404

Iguain District is one of eight districts of the province Huanta in Peru.

== Ethnic groups ==
The people in the district are mainly indigenous citizens of Quechua descent. Quechua is the language which the majority of the population (81.05%) learnt to speak in childhood, 18.67% of the residents started speaking using the Spanish language (2007 Peru Census).

== See also ==
- Inka Raqay
- Kachimayu
- Tinyaq
