= Tambo District, La Mar =

Coordinates: 12.9568°S 74.1633°W

Tambo Tampu
- District
- Interactive map of Tambo
- Country: Peru
- Region: Ayacucho
- Province: La Mar
- Capital: Tambo

Government
  - Mayor: Ciro Gavilan Palomino

Area
  - Total: 335.18 km^{2} (129.41 sq mi)
- Elevation: 3,219 m (10,561 ft)

Population (2005 census)
  - Total: 17,596
  - Density: 52.497/km^{2} (135.97/sq mi)
- Time zone: UTC-5 (PET)
- UBIGEO: 050508

Tambo District is one of eight districts of the La Mar Province in Peru.

== Geography ==
One of the highest peaks of the district is Rasuwillka at approximately 4,800 m (15,700 ft). Other mountains are listed below:

- Apachita
- Ch'uru Q'asa
- Hatun Parya Urqu
- Ichhu Pata
- Pisqu Willka
- Qarwa Pata
- Qucha Urqu
- Runa Wañusqa
- Salta Waylla
- Wanu Pata
- Yana Rumi

== Ethnic groups ==
The people in the district are mainly indigenous citizens of Quechua descent. Quechua is the language which the majority of the population (87.40%) learnt to speak in childhood, 12.36% of the residents started speaking using the Spanish language (2007 Peru Census).
