= San Pedro de Cachora District =

Coordinates: 13°30′47″S 72°48′36″W

San Pedro de Cachora
- District
- Interactive map of San Pedro de Cachora
- Country: Peru
- Region: Apurímac
- Province: Abancay
- Founded: December 7, 1943
- Capital: Cachora

Government
  - Mayor: Huber Cuaresma Espinoza

Area
  - Total: 108.77 km^{2} (42.00 sq mi)
- Elevation: 2,903 m (9,524 ft)

Population (2005 census)
  - Total: 3,763
  - Density: 34.60/km^{2} (89.60/sq mi)
- Time zone: UTC-5 (PET)
- UBIGEO: 030108

San Pedro de Cachora District is one of the nine districts of the province Abancay in Peru.

== Ethnic groups ==
The people in the district are mainly indigenous citizens of Quechua descent. Quechua is the language which the majority of the population (62.43%) learnt to speak in childhood, 37.05% of the residents started speaking using the Spanish language (2007 Peru Census).

== See also ==
- Inka Raqay
- Inka Wasi
