= San Salvador de Quije District =

Coordinates: 14°41′38″S 74°07′27″W

San Salvador de Quije
- District
- Location of San Salvador de Quije in the Sucre province
- Country: Peru
- Region: Ayacucho
- Province: Sucre
- Founded: May 21, 1962
- Capital: San Salvador de Quije
- Subdivisions: 33 populated places

Area
  - Total: 144.63 km^{2} (55.84 sq mi)
- Elevation: 3,210 m (10,530 ft)

Population (2005 census)
  - Total: 1,525
  - Density: 10.54/km^{2} (27.31/sq mi)
- Time zone: UTC-5 (PET)
- UBIGEO: 050909

San Salvador de Quije is one of 11 districts of the Sucre Province in the Ayacucho region in Peru.

== Population ==
The population of San Salvador de Quije (2005 census) is 1,525 people, 788 men and 737 women.

== Ethnic groups ==
The people in the district are mainly indigenous citizens of Quechua descent. Quechua is the language which the majority of the population (95.86%) learnt to speak in childhood, 3.94% of the residents started speaking using the Spanish language (2007 Peru Census).

== Administrative division ==
The populated places in the district are:

- San Salvador de Quije
- Lluchcanta
- Chilcabamba
- Huanchos
- Huacha Huacha
- Chirihuaycco
- Toccyascca
- Potongo
- Huayhuani
- Irapata
- Accobamba
- Lleocca
- Molle Pata
- Huampo
- Orccochacra
- Rojasccata
- Huaychilla
- Humalucha
- Pacpaca
- Comunpampa
- Huito
- Ccochcca
- Pallcca
- Chiuchirilla
- Gailaccocha
- pallccacha
- Pichuspata
- Vista Alegre
- Ayapata
- Mollepampa
- Matara
- Ccocha Pata
- Ccarahuisa
