= Rasuwillka =

Mountain in Peru

- Location within Peru

Highest point
- Elevation: 5,000 m (16,000 ft)
- Coordinates: 14°19′21″S 73°46′59″W

Geography
- Location: Peru, Ayacucho Region, Lucanas Province, Sucre Province
- Parent range: Andes

Rasuwillka (Quechua, hispanicized spelling Rasuhuilca) is a mountain in the Andes of Peru, about 5,000 m (16,404 ft) high. It is located in the Ayacucho Region, Lucanas Province, Chipao District, and in the Sucre Province, Morcolla District. Rasuwillka lies northwest of Qarwarasu.
