= Incahuasi (Apurímac) =

Mountain in Peru

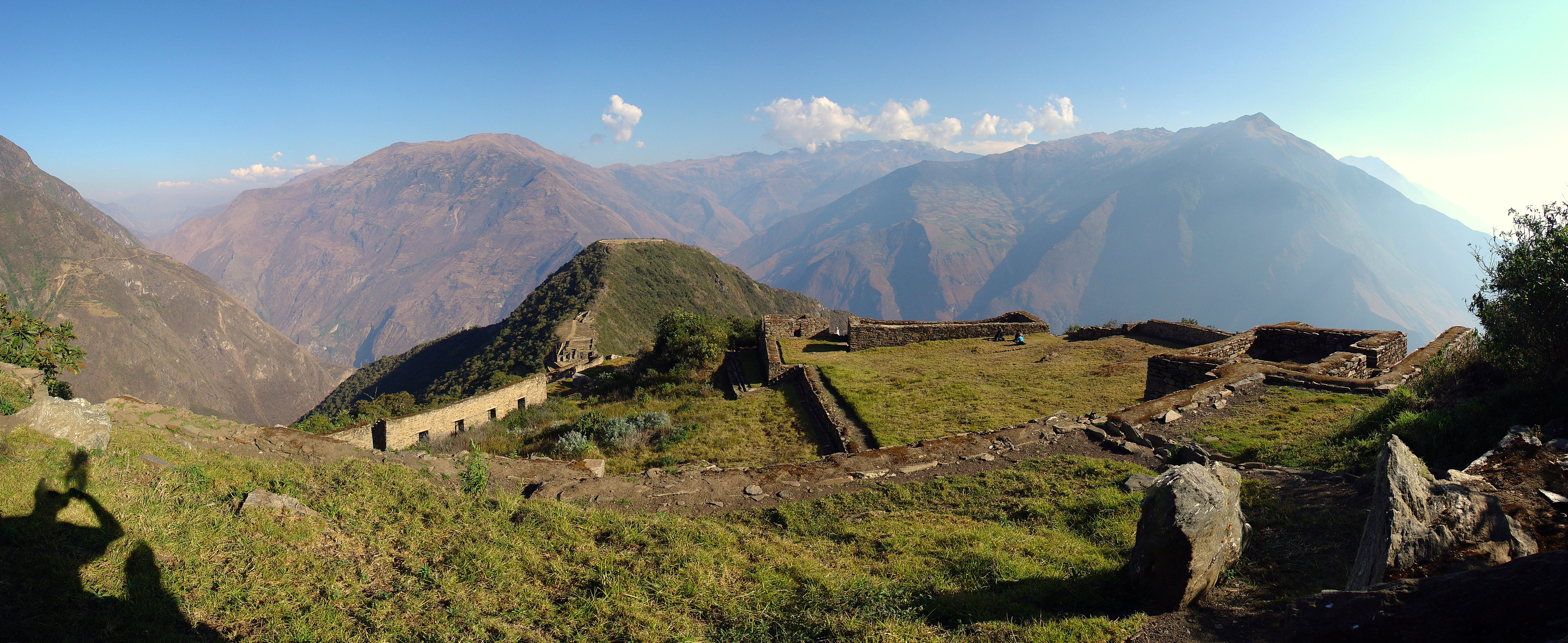
- The mountains Incahuasi (on the left) and K'usilluyuq (on the right) as seen from Choquequirao

Highest point
- Elevation: 4,315 m (14,157 ft)
- Coordinates: 13°26′50″S 72°51′30″W

Geography
- Location within Peru
- Location: Peru, Apurímac Region, Abancay Province
- Parent range: Andes, Vilcabamba

Incahuasi (possibly from Quechua inka Inca, wasi house, "Inca house",) is a mountain in the Vilcabamba mountain range in the Andes of Peru whose summit reaches 4,315 metres (14,157 ft) above sea level. It is situated in the Apurímac Region, Abancay Province, Cachora District. The mountain lies on the bank of the Apurímac River, opposite the archaeological site of Choquequirao (possibly from in the Quechua spelling Chuqik'iraw). On its northern slope there is a small archaeological site named Inka Raqay. Tourists are also attracted by the viewpoint of Incahuasi which provides good views of the Apurímac valley, Choquequirao and Padreyoc.

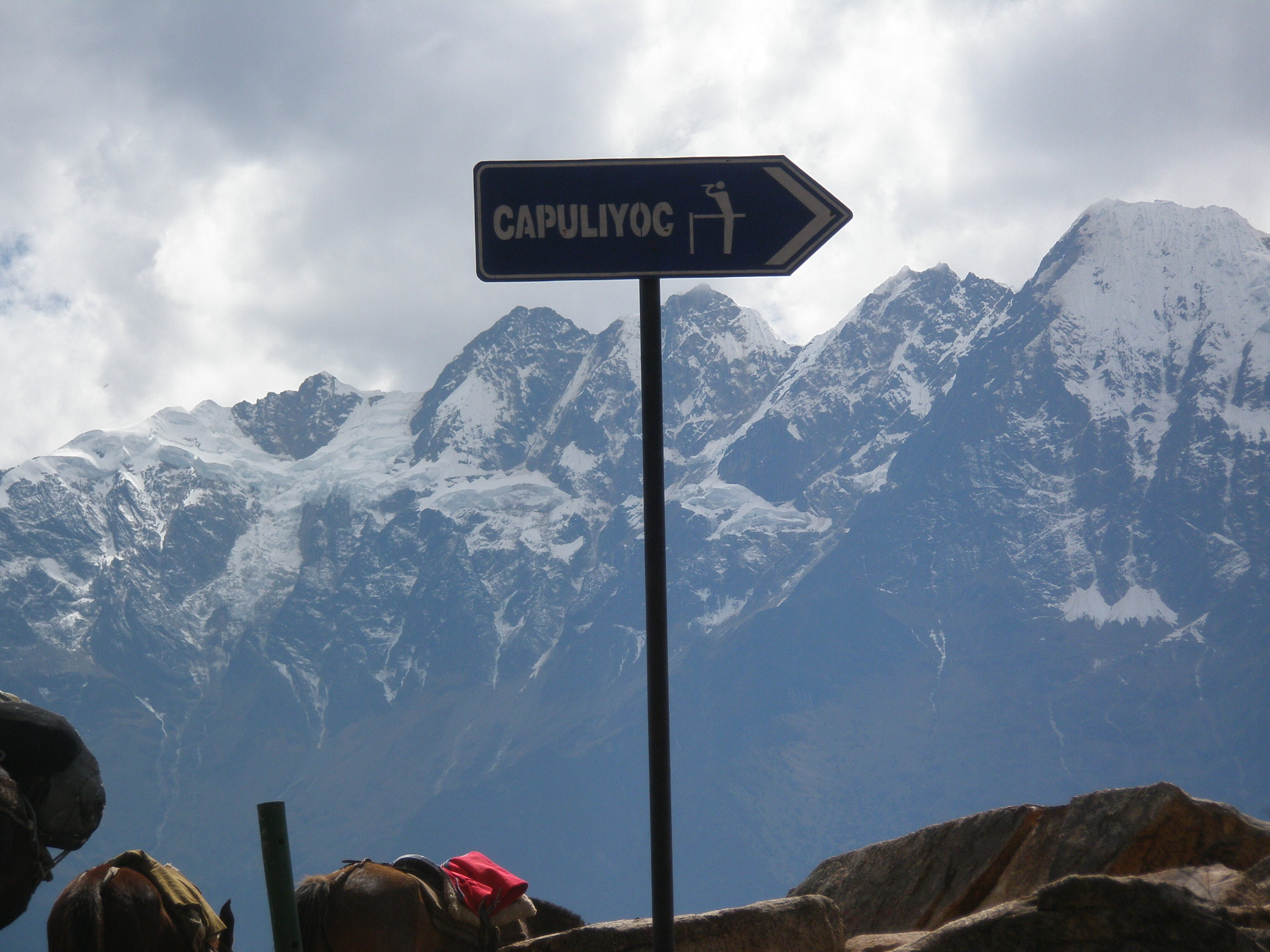
Signs for tourists at the viewpoint of Incahuasi with Padreyoc in the background.
