= Huanta District =

Coordinates: 12.9397°S 74.2475°W

Huanta
- District
- Interactive map of Huanta
- Country: Peru
- Region: Ayacucho
- Province: Huanta
- Capital: Huanta

Government
  - Mayor: Renol Silbio Pichardo Ramos

Area
  - Total: 375.3 km^{2} (144.9 sq mi)
- Elevation: 2,628 m (8,622 ft)

Population (2017)
  - Total: 39,517
  - Density: 105.3/km^{2} (272.7/sq mi)
- Time zone: UTC-5 (PET)
- UBIGEO: 050401

Huanta District is one of eight districts of the Huanta Province in Peru. Its seat is Huanta.

== Geography ==
One of the highest peaks of the district is Rasuwillka at approximately 4,800 m (15,700 ft). Other mountains are listed below:

- Ch'aki Qucha
- Mataru Q'asa
- Quri Willka
- Titi Q'asa
- Yana Waqra

Some of the largest lakes of the district are Qarqarqucha, Ichmaqucha, Mituqucha, Muruqucha, Chakaqucha, San Antonio, Yanaqucha, Pampaqucha, Pisququcha, Jarjaqucha and Hatun Tiklla.

The most important river is the Kachimayu ("salt river") on the western border of the district. It is an affluent of the Mantaro River.

== Ethnic groups ==
The people in the district are mainly indigenous citizens of Quechua descent. Quechua is the language which the majority of the population (52.78%) learnt to speak in childhood, 46.89% of the residents started speaking using the Spanish language (2007 Peru Census).

== See also ==
- Pusuquy Pata
