= Kuntur Sinqa (Ayacucho) =

Mountain in Peru

- Location within Peru

Highest point
- Coordinates: 12°48′51″S 74°16′35″W

Geography
- Location: Peru, Ayacucho Region, Huanta Province
- Parent range: Andes

Kuntur Sinqa (Quechua kuntur condor, sinqa nose, "condor nose", also spelled Condor Sencca, Condor-Sencca, Condor Senja) is a mountain in the Andes of Peru. It is located in the Ayacucho Region, Huanta Province, Luricocha District. Kuntur Sinqa lies on the right bank of the Mantaro River, east of San Miguel de Mayocc and southwest of San José de Secce.

On August 16, 1945, a considerable landslide occurred on the northwest slope of Kuntur Sinqa. It dammed the Mantaro River for about 73 days.
