= Kunturmarka, Ayacucho =

Archaeological site in Peru

Kunturmarka
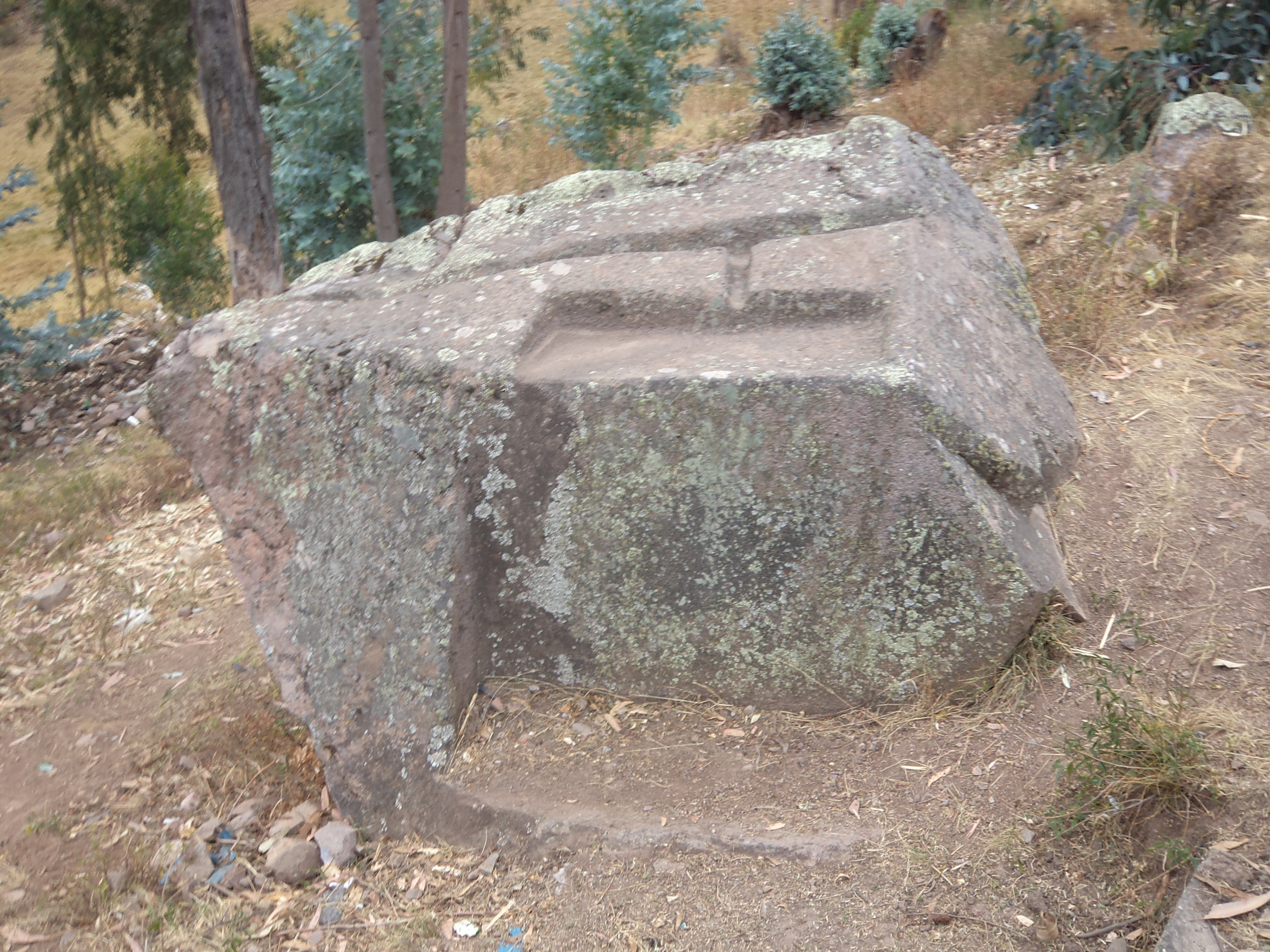
- Lavadero de la virgen (washing place of the virgin) at Kunturmarka
- Location: Peru, Ayacucho Region, Huanta Province
- Region: Andes

Kunturmarka (Quechua kuntur condor, marka village / storey, Hispanicized spelling Condormarca) is an archaeological site in Peru. It is situated in the Ayacucho Region, Huanta Province, Huamanguilla District.
