= Yanaqucha (Huanta) =

Lake in Peru

- Location within Peru
- Location: Peru; Ayacucho Region
- Coordinates: 12°53′59″S 74°08′38″W
- Max. length: 0.84 km (0.52 mi)
- Max. width: 0.37 km (0.23 mi)
- Surface elevation: 4,205 m (13,796 ft)

Yanaqucha (Quechua yana black, very dark, qucha lake, "black lake", Hispanicized spelling Yanacocha) is a lake in Peru located in Huanta District, Huanta Province, Ayacucho Region. It is situated at a height of about 4,205 metres (13,796 ft), about 0.84 km long and 0.37 km at its widest point. Yanaqucha lies south of the mountain Rasuwillka and northeast of the lake Pampaqucha.
