= Pusuquy Pata =

Archaeological site in Peru

- Ch'illiku Pampa
- Type: tombs
- Cultures: Wari
- Location: Peru, Ayacucho Region
- Region: Andes

Pusuquy Pata (Ayacucho Quechua pusuquy a cactus, pata step, bank of a river, hispanicized spelling Posoqoypata) or Ch'illiku Pampa (Quechua ch'illiku cricket, pampa a large plain, "cricket plain", also spelled Chillicopampa, Chillicupampa, Chillikupampa) is an archaeological site in the Ayacucho Region in Peru. It is located in the Huanta Province, Huanta District. The site consists of tombs of the Wari culture.
