= Querobamba =

- Town
- Location within Peru
- Coordinates: 14°S 73.8°W
- Country: Peru
- Region: Ayacucho
- Province: Sucre
- District: Querobamba
- Time zone: UTC-5 (PET)

Querobamba is a town in Central Peru, capital of Sucre Province in Ayacucho Region.
