= Huacaña District =

Coordinates: 14°41′38″S 74°07′27″W

Huacaña
- District
- Location of Huacaña in the Sucre province
- Country: Peru
- Region: Ayacucho
- Province: Sucre
- Capital: Huacaña
- Subdivisions: 15 populated places

Area
  - Total: 132.73 km^{2} (51.25 sq mi)
- Elevation: 3,170 m (10,400 ft)

Population (2005 census)
  - Total: 633
  - Density: 4.77/km^{2} (12.4/sq mi)
- Time zone: UTC-5 (PET)
- UBIGEO: 050905

Huacaña is one of 11 districts of the Sucre Province in the Ayacucho region in Peru.

== Population ==
The population of Huacaña is 633 people, consisting of 306 men and 327 women.

== Ethnic groups ==
The people in the district are mainly indigenous citizens of Quechua descent. Quechua is the language which the majority of the population (78.18%) learnt to speak in childhood, 21.65% of the residents started speaking using the Spanish language (2007 Peru Census).

== Administrative division ==
The populated places in the district are Huacaña, Chuschama, Jornada, Pisicc Tocllana, Milluqucha (Milloccocha), Yahuayro, Posihua, Challwani (Challhuani), Aluzpampa, Paccha, Ccellhinsa, Matiyuq (Matiyocc), Corita, Paucaray and Virgen de las Nieves.

== See also ==
- Aqu Urqu
