= Luricocha District =

Coordinates: 12°51′S 74°16′W

Luricocha Luriqucha
- District
- Interactive map of Luricocha
- Country: Peru
- Region: Ayacucho
- Province: Huanta
- Capital: Luricocha

Government
  - Mayor: Americo Paulino Ludeña Tello

Area
  - Total: 130.04 km^{2} (50.21 sq mi)
- Elevation: 2,580 m (8,460 ft)

Population (2005 census)
  - Total: 5,782
  - Density: 44.46/km^{2} (115.2/sq mi)
- Time zone: UTC-5 (PET)
- UBIGEO: 050405

Luricocha District is one of eight districts of the province Huanta in Peru.

== Ethnic groups ==
The people in the district are mainly indigenous citizens of Quechua descent. The majority of the population (65.24%) are native Quechua speakers, while 34.44% of the resident's native language is Spanish according to the 2007 Peru Census.

== Climate ==
Climate data for Huanta, Luricocha, elevation 2,485 m (8,153 ft), (1991–2020)
Month	Jan	Feb	Mar	Apr	May	Jun	Jul	Aug	Sep	Oct	Nov	Dec	Year
Mean daily maximum °C (°F)	26.2 (79.2)	25.9 (78.6)	26.0 (78.8)	26.4 (79.5)	26.9 (80.4)	26.3 (79.3)	26.5 (79.7)	27.1 (80.8)	27.4 (81.3)	27.7 (81.9)	28.7 (83.7)	26.8 (80.2)	26.8 (80.3)
Mean daily minimum °C (°F)	11.6 (52.9)	11.6 (52.9)	11.1 (52.0)	10.7 (51.3)	9.9 (49.8)	9.3 (48.7)	8.3 (46.9)	9.4 (48.9)	11.0 (51.8)	11.9 (53.4)	12.3 (54.1)	11.7 (53.1)	10.7 (51.3)
Average precipitation mm (inches)	108.4 (4.27)	88.2 (3.47)	47.9 (1.89)	23.3 (0.92)	7.2 (0.28)	1.9 (0.07)	3.6 (0.14)	8.4 (0.33)	8.4 (0.33)	27.5 (1.08)	39.0 (1.54)	88.4 (3.48)	452.2 (17.8)
Source: National Meteorology and Hydrology Service of Peru

== See also ==
- Kachimayu
- Kuntur Sinqa
