= Chilcayoc District =

Coordinates: 14°41′38″S 74°07′27″W

Chilcayoc Ch'illkayuq
- District
- Location of Chilcayoc in the Sucre province
- Country: Peru
- Region: Ayacucho
- Province: Sucre
- Founded: March 20, 1928
- Capital: Chilcayoc
- Subdivisions: 9 populated places

Area
  - Total: 33.06 km^{2} (12.76 sq mi)
- Elevation: 3,373 m (11,066 ft)

Population (2005 census)
  - Total: 677
  - Density: 20.5/km^{2} (53.0/sq mi)
- Time zone: UTC-5 (PET)
- UBIGEO: 050904

Chilcayoc (in Hispanicized spelling) or Ch'illkayuq (Quechua ch'illka baccharis, -yuq a suffix to indicate possession, "the one that has got baccharis" or "the one with baccharis") is the smallest of 11 districts of the Sucre Province in the Ayacucho region in Peru.

== Population ==
The population of Chilcayoc is 677 people, 324 men and 353 women.

== Ethnic groups ==
The people in the district are mainly indigenous citizens of Quechua descent. Quechua is the language which the majority of the population (86.71%) learnt to speak in childhood, 13.13% of the residents started speaking using the Spanish language (2007 Peru Census).

== Administrative division ==
The populated places in the district are:

- Ch'illkayuq (Chilcayoc)
- Patawasi (Patahuasi)
- Kawrakancha (Cabracancha)
- Wiqrupampa (Hueccropampa)
- Ankasilla (Anccasilla)
- Hatun Rumi (Jatun Rumi)
- Cañana
- Wamrani (Huambrani)
- Willkapampa (Vilcabamba)

== Climate ==
Climate data for Chilcayoc, elevation 3,395 m (11,138 ft), (1991–2020)
Month	Jan	Feb	Mar	Apr	May	Jun	Jul	Aug	Sep	Oct	Nov	Dec	Year
Mean daily maximum °C (°F)	19.6 (67.3)	19.0 (66.2)	18.8 (65.8)	19.3 (66.7)	19.6 (67.3)	19.3 (66.7)	19.1 (66.4)	20.3 (68.5)	20.7 (69.3)	21.5 (70.7)	22.2 (72.0)	20.5 (68.9)	20.0 (68.0)
Mean daily minimum °C (°F)	6.6 (43.9)	6.5 (43.7)	6.2 (43.2)	5.3 (41.5)	3.6 (38.5)	2.9 (37.2)	2.6 (36.7)	3.7 (38.7)	5.5 (41.9)	6.1 (43.0)	6.3 (43.3)	6.7 (44.1)	5.2 (41.3)
Average precipitation mm (inches)	204.3 (8.04)	220.7 (8.69)	193.8 (7.63)	85.7 (3.37)	26.3 (1.04)	11.8 (0.46)	17.8 (0.70)	18.9 (0.74)	34.9 (1.37)	78.0 (3.07)	76.6 (3.02)	135.0 (5.31)	1,103.8 (43.44)
Source: National Meteorology and Hydrology Service of Peru
