= Belén District, Sucre =

Coordinates: 13°48′34″S 73°45′24″W

Belén District
- District
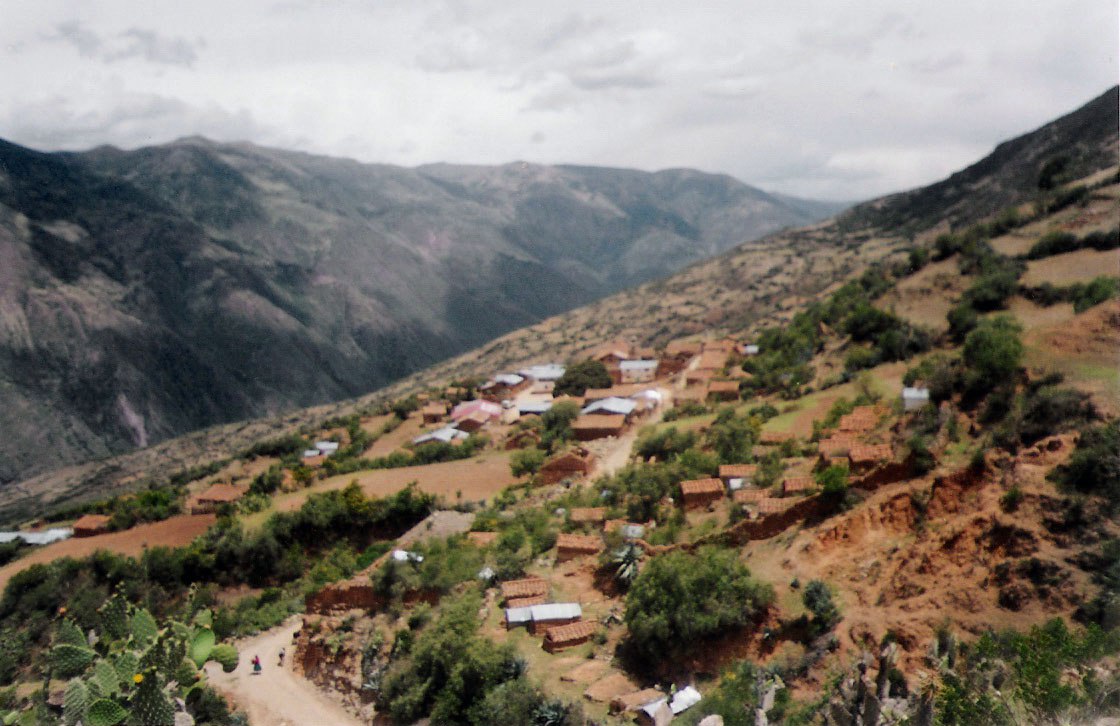

- Location of Belen in the Sucre province
- Country: Peru
- Department: Ayacucho
- Province: Sucre
- Founded: November 23, 1964
- Capital: Belén
- Subdivisions: 4 populated places

Government
  - Mayor: Julián Elías Cárdenas Pérez

Area
  - Total: 41.46 km^{2} (16.01 sq mi)
- Elevation: 3,195 m (10,482 ft)

Population (2005 census)
  - Total: 611
  - Density: 14.7/km^{2} (38.2/sq mi)
- Time zone: UTC-5 (PET)
- UBIGEO: 050902

Belén is one of 11 districts of the Sucre Province in the Ayacucho region in Peru.

== History ==
Belén District was created by Law No.15231 in Nov 23, 1964, during first term of President Fernando Belaúnde

== Administrative division ==
The populated places in the district are:

- Belen
- Socos
- Cochayocc
- Cuije

== Population ==
The population of Belén is 611 people, 292 men and 319 women.

== Ethnic groups ==
The people in the district are mainly indigenous citizens of Quechua descent. Quechua is the language which the majority of the population (79.32%) learnt to speak in childhood, 20.52% of the residents started speaking using the Spanish language (2007 Peru Census).

== Authorities ==
=== Mayors ===
- 2011-2014: Julián Elías Cárdenas Pérez.
- 2007-2010: José Luis Romero Sheron.

== See also ==
- Subdivisions of Peru
