= Sucre province =

Coordinates: 14.009499°S 73.839576°W

Sucre
- Province
- Location of Sucre in the Ayacucho Region
- Country: Peru
- Region: Ayacucho

Area
  - Total: 1,785.64 km^{2} (689.44 sq mi)

Population
  - Total: 9,445
  - Density: 5.289/km^{2} (13.70/sq mi)
- UBIGEO: 0509

Sucre is a province in the eastern part of the Ayacucho Region in Peru.

== Geography ==
One of the highest mountains in the province is Qarwarasu at 5,112 m (16,772 ft). Other mountains are listed below:

- Anta Q'asa
- Apu Pumani
- Aqu Urqu
- Chawpi Wasi
- Chillwa Chillwa
- Ch'illkacha
- Kampanayuq
- Kuyuq
- K'ark'ani
- Mach'ay Pata
- Maray Urquna
- Masu Pampa
- Muyu Muyu
- Nina Pampa
- Ñawincha
- Pallqa Urqu
- Palta Rumi
- Pampa Wasi
- Parqa Parqa
- Pata Wasi
- Pilluni
- Pinqulluna
- Pirwa
- Puywani
- Phiruru
- Qucha Urqu
- Qura Qura
- Q'ala Urqu
- Q'illu Urqu
- Rasuwillka
- Saywachayuq
- Sikuwani
- Sinqa Sinqa
- Sinqata
- Siwi Q'asa
- Sura Pata
- T'utura
- Uqi Qaqa
- Usqunta
- Wallunk'ani
- Waman Wiri
- Wamp'u
- Waraquchayuq
- Wayllani
- Wayrana
- Wit'u
- Yaku Tinku
- Yana Phaqcha
- Yana Qucha
- Yana Urqu
- Yana Yana
- Yawyu

== Political division ==
The province is divided into eleven districts.

- Belén (Belén)
- Chalcos (Chalcos)
- Chilcayoc (Chilcayoc)
- Huacaña (Huacaña)
- Morcolla (Morcolla)
- Paico (Paico)
- Querobamba (Querobamba)
- San Pedro de Larcay (San Pedro de Larcay)
- San Salvador de Quije (San Salvador de Quije)
- Santiago de Paucaray (Santiago de Paucaray)
- Soras (Soras)

== Ethnic groups ==
The people in the province are mainly indigenous citizens of Quechua descent. Quechua is the language which the majority of the population (76.47%) learnt to speak in childhood, 23.21% of the residents started speaking using the Spanish language (2007 Peru Census).
