= Pichari District =

Pichari
- District
- Interactive map of Pichari
- Coordinates: 12.5197°S 73.8295°W
- Country: Peru
- Region: Cusco
- Province: La Convención
- Founded: August 7, 1995
- Capital: Pichari

Government
  - Mayor: Miky Joaquin Dipas Huaman

Area
  - Total: 730.45 km^{2} (282.03 sq mi)
- Elevation: 600 m (2,000 ft)

Population (2005 census)
  - Total: 14,788
  - Density: 20.245/km^{2} (52.434/sq mi)
- Time zone: UTC-5 (PET)
- UBIGEO: 080910

Pichari District is one of ten districts of the province La Convención in Peru.
