= Inka Raqay, Apurímac =

Archaeological site in Peru

Coordinates: 13.4482°S 72.8552°W

Inka Raqay
- Interactive map of Inka Raqay
- Location: Peru, Apurímac Region, Abancay Province

Site notes
- Height: 3,590 metres (11,778 ft)

Inka Raqay or Inkaraqay (Quechua Inka Inca, raqay ruin, a demolished building; shed, storehouse or dormitory for the laborers of a farm; a generally old building without roof, only with walls) is a small archaeological complex in Peru. It lies in the Apurímac Region, Abancay Province, Cachora District. Inka Raqay is situated at a height of 3,590 metres (11,778 ft) on the northern slope of Inka Wasi south of the archaeological site of Choquequirao, above the Apurímac River.
