= Yanaqucha (Huamanguilla) =

Lake in Peru

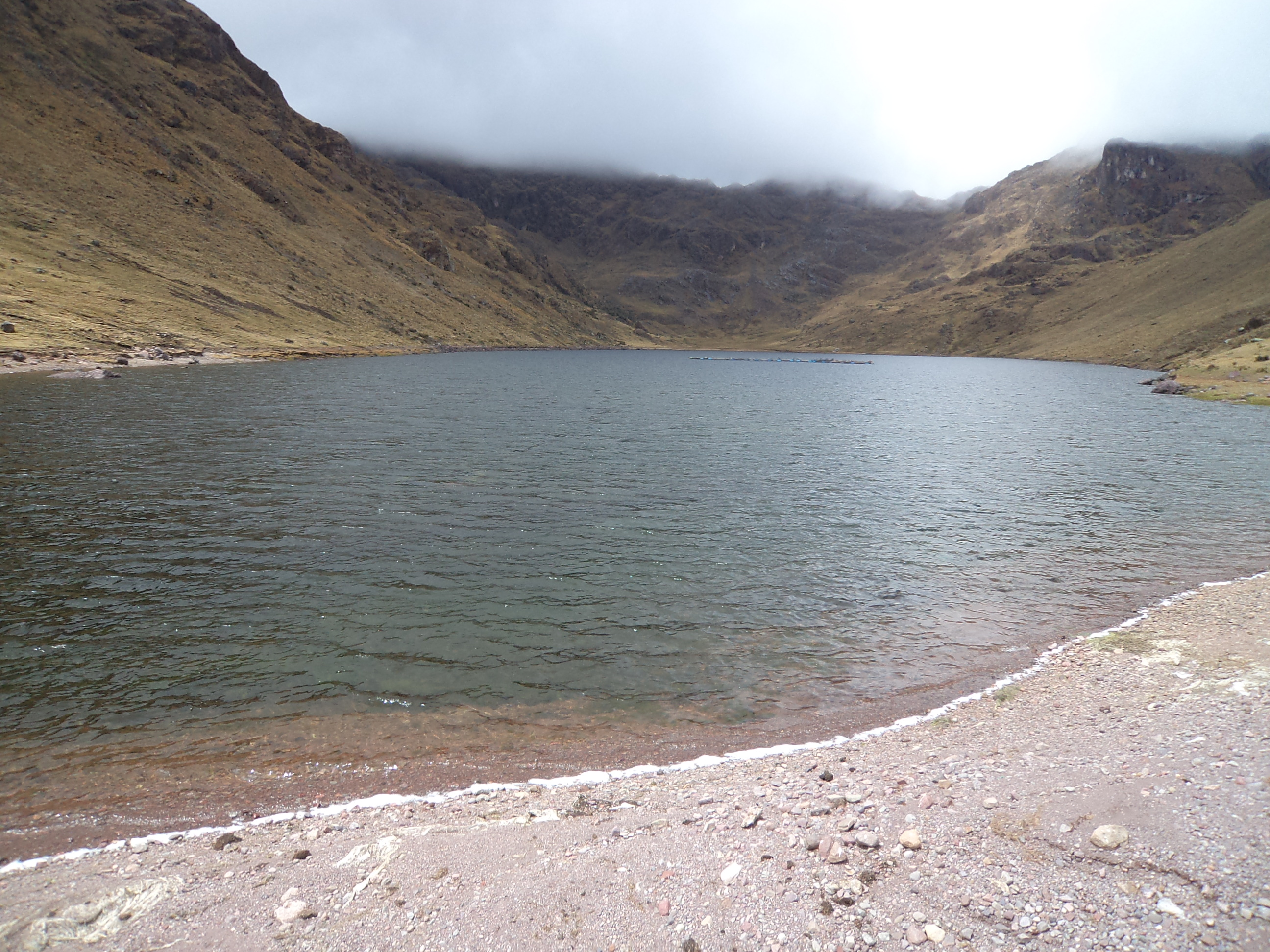

- Location within Peru
- Location: Peru; Ayacucho Region
- Coordinates: 12°57′09″S 74°07′10″W
- Max. length: 0.90 km (0.56 mi)
- Max. width: 0.29 km (0.18 mi)
- Surface elevation: 4,091 m (13,422 ft)

Yanaqucha (Quechua yana black, very dark, qucha lake, "black lake", hispanicized spelling Yanacocha) is a lake in Peru; it is located in Huamanguilla District, Huanta Province, Ayacucho Region. It is situated at a height of about 4,091 metres (13,422 ft), about 0.90 km long and 0.29 km at its widest point.
