= Huanta province =

Coordinates: 12°56′23″S 74°14′51″W

Huanta
- Province
- Flag Coat of arms

- Location of Huanta in the Ayacucho Region
- Country: Peru
- Region: Ayacucho
- Capital: Huanta

Government
  - Mayor: Renol Silbio Pichardo Ramos

Area
  - Total: 3,878.91 km^{2} (1,497.66 sq mi)
- Elevation: 2,628 m (8,622 ft)

Population
  - Total: 89,466
  - Density: 23.065/km^{2} (59.737/sq mi)
- UBIGEO: 0504
- Website: www.munihuanta.gob.pe

Huanta is the northernmost of the eleven provinces in the Ayacucho region in Peru. The capital of the Huanta province is the city of Huanta.

== History ==
In the colonial era, the province of Huanta was larger than it is currently, with traditional ties to the central sierra of Peru, and largely indigenous. The province's capital, also called Huanta, was the site of an ecclesiastical doctrina and the center of a civil administrative district, corregimiento. In a royal census of 1795, Huanta province had 27,337 inhabitants, of which 10,080 (36%) were mixed-race mestizos. Huanta was the site of a major rebellion (1825–28) against the newly-formed Peruvian state. The Huanta Rebellion, led by Antonio Huachaca, is characterized as a monarchist rebellion. It brought together different ethnic and occupational groups in complex interactions. The peasants of Huanta, called Iquichanos, were monarchist rebels and were transformed into liberal guerrillas. They allied with Spanish officers and merchants, mestizo land owners, and priests to attack the Peruvian republic in the name of the Spanish king Ferdinand VII. It was led by Antonio Abad Huachaca, an illiterate arriero or muleteer, an occupation that brought him into contact with areas outside his home base, since mules were the primary means of hauling freight and trade goods in the colonial era. The Huanta rebellion was defeated militarily, but the local leaders did not suffer the severe repression that characterized earlier rebellions, most notably the Rebellion of Túpac Amaru II.

In the late twentieth century, the Maoist insurgency of Shining Path was active in the region. In the town of Uchuraccay eight journalists investigating the insurgency were murdered in 1983, apparently by comunero peasants. A presidential commission overseen by Mario Vargas Llosa sought to uncover the truth about the incident and produced a report.

== Geography ==
There is a wide variety of Peruvian ecological zones in Huanta province, with narrow valleys and high mountains. Ecological zones include the quechua (2300-3500m), the suni (3200-3900m), and the selva alta ("high jungle"), and the punas. The Mantaro River (by west) and the Apurímac River (by northeast) delineate the boundaries of the province.

One of the highest peaks of the province is Rasuwillka at approximately 4,800 m (15,700 ft). Other mountains are listed below:

- Allpa Chaka
- Aqun
- Asiruyuq
- Aya Wayq'u
- Chawpi Qichqa
- Chawpi Urqu
- Chiri P'unqu
- Chiri Urqu
- Chupasqa
- Chuqi Wiska
- Ch'aki Qucha
- Ch'uru Q'asa
- Hatun Qaqa
- Ichhu Rumi
- Ichhu Urqu
- Ichhu Rutuna
- Irqi Qaqa
- Kisu Rumi
- Kuntur Sinqa
- Llant'a Pallana
- Llaqta Punta
- Millpu Q'asa
- Muru Qucha
- Pampa Q'asa
- Parqu Pampa
- Paru Pampa
- Parya Punta
- Payqu Pata Urqu
- Pirwa Qaqa
- Pisqu Willka
- Puka Mach'ay
- Puka Q'asa
- Puka Yaku
- Pukara
- Punta Urqu
- Punwina Q'asa
- Puywan Muqu
- Qarwa Qaqa
- Qullpa
- Q'illu Waytayuq
- Raqraq Q'asa Punta
- Rumi Runtu
- Runa Tullu
- Sankayuniyuq
- Saywa Urqu
- Sinwa Q'asa
- Supay Urqu
- T'uturayuq
- Uchpa Q'asa
- Ukumariyuq
- Wachu P'itiq
- Wachu Qaqa
- Wachwa Q'asa
- Waman Pata
- Waylla Punta
- Wiñas Rumi
- Wiska Ranra
- Wisk'achayuq
- Yana Qucha
- Yana Urqu
- Yana Waqra
- Yana Willka
- Yawri
- Yuraq Rumi

== Political division ==
The province measures 3,878.91 square kilometres (1,497.66 sq mi) and is divided into twelve districts.

1. Huanta (Huanta)
2. Ayahuanco (Viracochan)
3. Huamanguilla (Huamanguilla)
4. Iguain (Macachacra)
5. Luricocha (Luricocha)
6. Santillana (San José de Secce)
7. Sivia (Sivia)
8. Llochegua (Llochegua)
9. Canayre (Canayre)
10. Uchuraccay (Huaynacancha)
11. Pucacolpa (Huallhua)
12. Chaca (Chaca)

== Ethnic groups ==
The people in the province are mainly indigenous citizens of Quechua descent. Quechua is the language which the majority of the population (67.17%) learned to speak in childhood, 32.45% of the residents started speaking using the Spanish language and 0.10% using Aymara (2007 Peru Census).

== Authorities ==
=== Mayors ===
- 2019-2022: Renol Silbio Pichardo Ramos.
- 2015-2018: Percy Abel Bermudo Valladares, Alianza Regional Ayacucho.

== Archaeology ==
Some of the most important archaeological sites of the province are Inka Raqay (or Allqu Willka), Kunturmarka, Marayniyuq, Mulinuyuq, Pusuquy Pata (or Ch'illiku Pampa) and Tinyaq.

== Festivities ==
- Lord of Maynay
- Our Lady of the Rosary
- Holy Week

== See also ==
- Administrative divisions of Peru
- Ecological zones of Peru
- Kachimayu
- Pampaqucha
- Yanaqucha (Huamanguilla)
- Yanaqucha (Huanta)
