= Sivia District =

Coordinates: 12.5116°S 73.8588°W

Sivia
- District
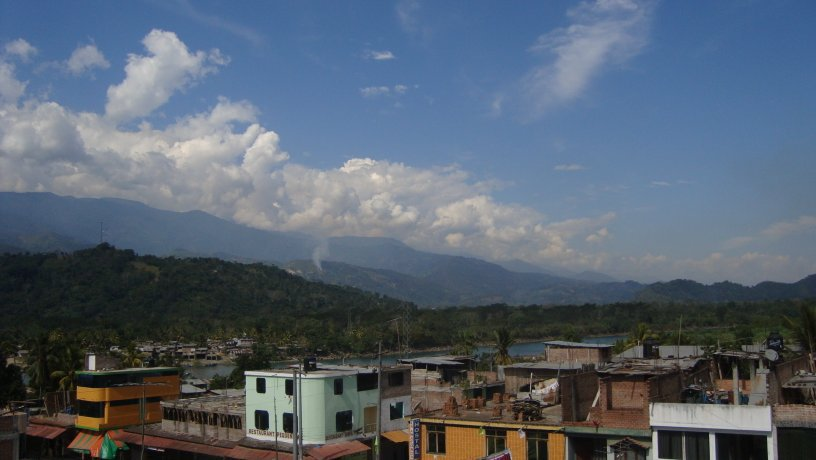
- Sivia
- Interactive map of Sivia
- Country: Peru
- Region: Ayacucho
- Province: Huanta
- Founded: November 6, 1992
- Capital: Sivia

Government
  - Mayor: Alejandro Gutierrez Escajadillo

Area
  - Total: 723.39 km^{2} (279.30 sq mi)
- Elevation: 551 m (1,808 ft)

Population (2007 census)
  - Total: 11,956
  - Density: 16.528/km^{2} (42.807/sq mi)
- Time zone: UTC-5 (PET)
- UBIGEO: 050407
- Website: desa.inei.gob.pe

Sivia District is located in the Huanta Province in the Ayacucho Region of Peru. The district was created by "legislative decree" 25845 on November 6, 1992. Its capital, Sivia, is located at an altitude of 551 m. The district had a population of 11,956 inhabitants as of the 2007 census, with an area of 723.39 km^{2} (279.30 sq mi).

== Capital ==
Sivia is the capital of the district with a 2010 population of 6,000 inhabitants, according to INEI 2007 Census it had only 3,319 inhabitants, this growth is due to migration receives from the Andean part of the Ayacucho Region those in search of better opportunities for development have been established in the city of Sivia.

== Geography ==
One of the highest peaks of the district is Allpa Chaka at approximately 4,400 m (14,400 ft). Other mountains are listed below:

- Aqun
- Chiri Urqu
- Chupasqa
- Ichhu Rumi
- Irqi Qaqa
- Muru Qucha
- Payqu Pata Urqu
- Pisqu Willka
- Puka Yaku
- Pukara
- P'unqu Qucha
- Q'iru Q'iru
- Rumi Runtu
- Saywa Urqu
- Supay Urqu
- Tika Wasin
- Wachu P'itiq
- Wisk'achayuq
- Yana Qucha
- Yana Willka
- Yuraq Rumi

== Ethnic groups ==
The people in the district are mainly indigenous citizens of Quechua descent. Quechua is the language which the majority of the population (67.11%) learnt to speak in childhood, 32.68% of the residents started speaking using the Spanish language (2007 Peru Census).
