= Inka Raqay, Ayacucho =

Archaeological site in Peru

Coordinates: 12.9923°S 74.2082°W

Inka Raqay
- Allqu Willka
- Location within Peru
- Location: Peru, Ayacucho Region
- Region: Andes

Inka Raqay (Quechua Inka Inca, raqay ruin, a demolished building; shed, storehouse or dormitory for the laborers of a farm; a generally old building without roof, only with walls) hispanicized spelling Incaraqay) or Allqu Willka (Allcuhuillca, Alkowillka) is an archaeological site in the Ayacucho Region in Peru. It is located in the Huanta Province, Iguain District, on top of the mountain named Allqu Willka.
