= Ccarhuarazo (Ayacucho) =

Mountain in Peru

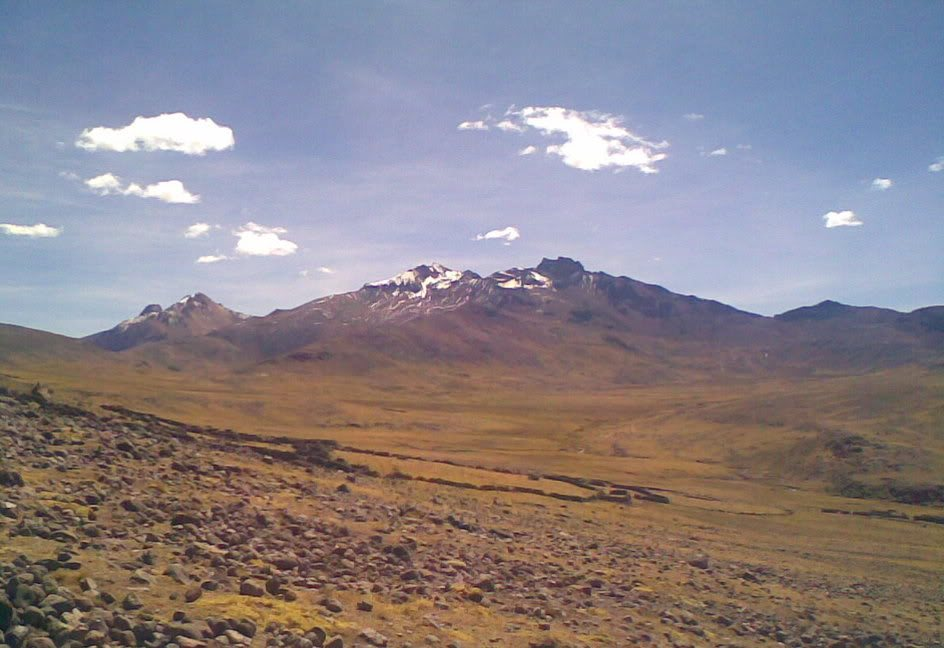

Highest point
- Elevation: 5,112 m (16,772 ft)
- Coordinates: 14°19′55″S 73°45′25″W

Geography
- Location within Peru
- Location: Peru, Ayacucho Region
- Parent range: Andes

Ccarhuarazo (possibly from Quechua, qarwa leaf worm; larva of a beetle; pale, yellowish, golden, Ancash Quechua rasu snow, ice, mountain with snow, Hispanicized spellings Carhuaraso, Carhuarasu, Carhuarazo, Ccarhuaraso, Ccarhuarasu, Ccarhuarazo, Qarwarazo) is a volcano in the Andes of Peru, about 5,112 m (16,772 ft) high. It is located in the Ayacucho Region, Lucanas Province, Chipao District as well as in the Sucre Province, Soras District.
