= Ahmad Bin Byat =

Emirati businessperson

Ahmad Abdullah Juma Bin Byat
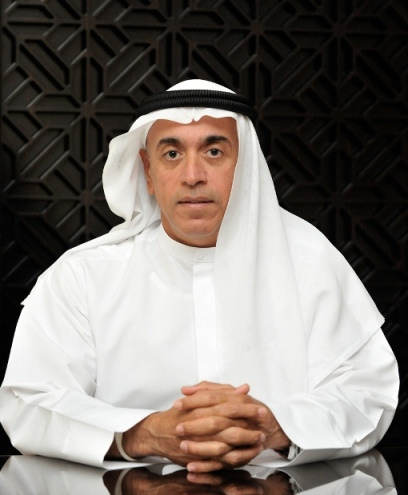
- Born: July 1, 1962 (age 64); Dubai, United Arab Emirates
- Occupations: Founding Chairman and CEO of Zaina Investments LLC; Vice Chairman of Dubai Chamber of Digital Economy; Member of Higher committee for future technologies for Dubai; Vice Chairman of Dubai Chambers; Vice Chairman of Commercial Bank of Dubai; Member of the Board of MAF Capital Majid Al Futtaim Group; Member of the Board of Trustees of Dubai National University University of Dubai
- Years active: 1984–present

Ahmad Abdullah Juma Bin Byat (Arabic: أحمد عبدالله جمعة بن بيات; born 1 July 1962) is an Emirati businessman and corporate executive. He has held senior positions in the telecommunications, technology, real estate, education and government sectors in Dubai and the United Arab Emirates.

Bin Byat began his career at Etisalat, where he worked from 1984 to 1999. He later held senior positions in Dubai's public sector and was chairman or executive of several companies and government-related organisations. He was the founding chairman of du and later was chief executive officer of Dubai Holding and executive chairman of TECOM Investments.

As of 2026, Bin Byat is vice chairman and managing director of Zaina Investments LLC and vice chairman of the Dubai Chamber of Digital Economy. He has also was on several government and institutional committees and boards.

== Career ==
=== Current ===
- Vice chairman and managing director, Zaina Investments LLC (2013–present)
- Vice Chairman, Dubai Chamber of Digital Economy (2021–present)
- Member of the Higher Committee for Future Technology and Digital Economy (2022–present)

== Early career ==
Bin Byat worked at Etisalat from 1984 to 1999, eventually as deputy regional manager. During this period, he was involved in the company's expansion and the development of telecommunications services in the United Arab Emirates.

He also was a board member of Thuraya, a UAE-based satellite communications company, during the late 1990s.

=== Government and public-sector roles ===
Bin Byat held several senior positions in the Government of Dubai during the 2000s. He was secretary-general of the Dubai Executive Council from 2006 to 2009 and chaired the Dubai Education Council from 2005 to 2006.

He also was on the UAE Supreme Committee for Telecommunications, the Dubai Supreme Fiscal Committee, and the Dubai Urban Planning Committee. His government-related roles included positions associated with economic development, telecommunications regulation, education and urban planning.

=== Corporate Leadership ===
==== du ====
Bin Byat was the founding chairman of Emirates Integrated Telecommunications Company (du), which launched commercial telecommunications services in the United Arab Emirates in 2007. He served as chairman from 2006 to 2018. Contemporary reporting described the company as a new telecommunications operator entering a market previously dominated by Etisalat.[1][2]

==== TECOM ====
Bin Byat was executive chairman of TECOM Investments from 2007 to 2012. During this period, the company expanded its portfolio of business communities and technology- and media-related investments. He was also involved in TECOM's investments in telecommunications and technology-related businesses. [3][4]

==== Dubai Holding ====
Bin Byat was appointed chief executive officer of Dubai Holding in 2009. During his tenure, he was involved in the group's corporate restructuring and strategic management. Contemporary reports described Dubai Holding as a major Dubai-based corporate group with interests including real estate, hospitality, telecommunications and technology-related businesses.[5][6]

==== Other positions ====
Bin Byat has also held senior positions in several Dubai government-related organisations and companies, including:

- Chairman of the Dubai Real Estate Corporation
- Chairman of the founding committee of Aswaaq
- Chairman of the Consulting Office
- Member of the board of trustees of Zayed University
- Member of the board of trustees of the Mohammed bin Rashid School of Government
- Director General of the Dubai Creative Clusters Authority
- Member of the board of Thuraya

These roles are summarized here to avoid listing routine board and committee responsibilities that are not independently documented as significant.

== Notable contributions ==
Bin Byat's career has included leadership roles in the development of telecommunications, technology-focused business communities and government-related economic initiatives in Dubai.

His most prominent corporate roles included founding chairmanship of du, leadership positions at TECOM, and was chief executive officer of Dubai Holding. During his tenure in these organisations, he was associated with the expansion of telecommunications services, technology-related investments and business communities in Dubai and the wider region.[1][3][5]
