= Mohammad Al Gergawi =

Politician of the United Arab Emirates

His Excellency Mohammad Al Gergawi
- محمد بن عبدالله القرقاوي
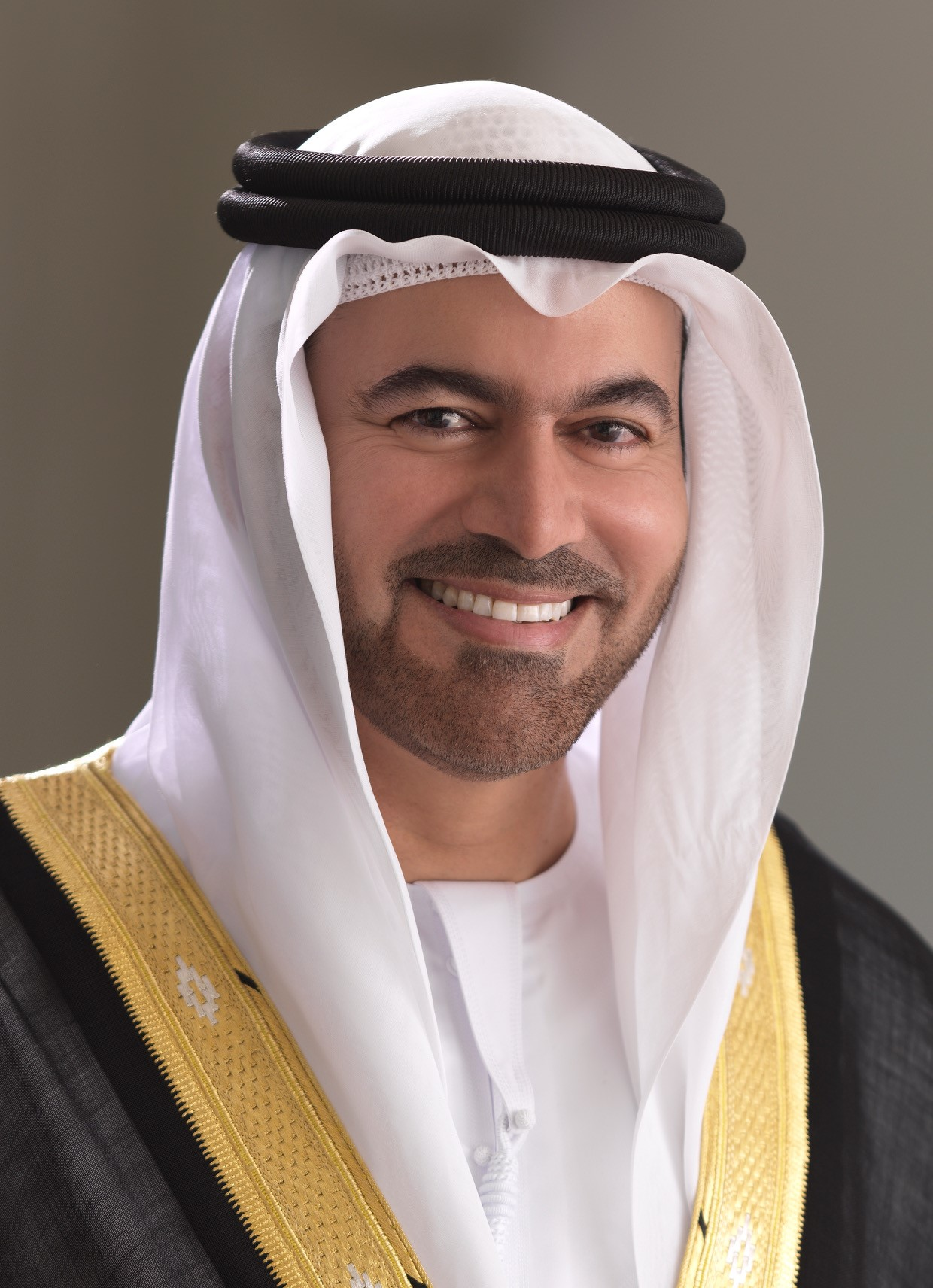

Minister of Cabinet Affairs
- Incumbent
- Assumed office 9 February 2006
- President: Khalifa bin Zayed Al Nahyan; Mohamed bin Zayed Al Nahyan
- Prime Minister: Mohammed bin Rashid Al Maktoum
- Preceded by: Post established

Personal details
- Born: 1963 (age 62–63) Dubai

Mohammad Abdullah Al Gergawi (Arabic: محمد بن عبدالله القرقاوي; born 1963, Dubai) is an Emirati politician who is the minister of cabinet affairs of the United Arab Emirates and the chairman of the Executive Office of Sheikh Mohammed bin Rashid Al Maktoum, in the government of Dubai.

== Early life ==
Al Gergawi was born in Dubai in 1963. His father, Abdulla Ali Al Gergawi, was a merchant in the city. He completed his primary and secondary school education in the emirate and attained a bachelor's degree in Business Administration from the United States.

== Political career ==
Al Gergawi was the chairman of Dubai Holding until March 2017. Through Dubai Holding, Al Gergawi helped envision and launch TECOM Group, Dubai Properties Group, Emirates Integrated Telecommunications, and Family Entertainment and New Media.

In 2007, Al Gergawi was appointed Chairman of the Mohammed bin Rashid Al Maktoum Foundation. He is the Secretary General of the Mohammed bin Rashid Global Initiatives, a charitable foundation that consolidates the philanthropic initiatives undertaken by Mohammed bin Rashid Al Maktoum. In addition to his ministerial duties, he holds several positions, including: Chairman of the Executive Office of Dubai; Chairman of the World Governments Summit (WGS); Vice Chairman of the Board of Trustees and Managing Director of the Dubai Future Foundation (DFF); Chairman of the Museum of the Future and Chairman of the Board of Trustees of Great Arab Minds.

=== Minister of Cabinet Affairs (2006–Present) ===
On 11 February 2006, UAE President Khalifa bin Zayed Al Nahyan issued a presidential decree appointing the new UAE cabinet, which included Al Gergawi as Minister of Cabinet Affairs, making the development of the UAE's Federal Government Strategy part of his responsibilities.

== Strategic projects in the Emirate of Dubai ==
Mohammed bin Rashid Al Maktoum assigned him to plan and implement a number of projects and initiatives launched by Dubai, including: Dubai Internet City, Dubai Media City, Knowledge Village, Dubai Healthcare City, Dubai Financial Centre, Mohammed bin Rashid Program for Leadership Development and International Humanitarian City.

== Higher education activity ==
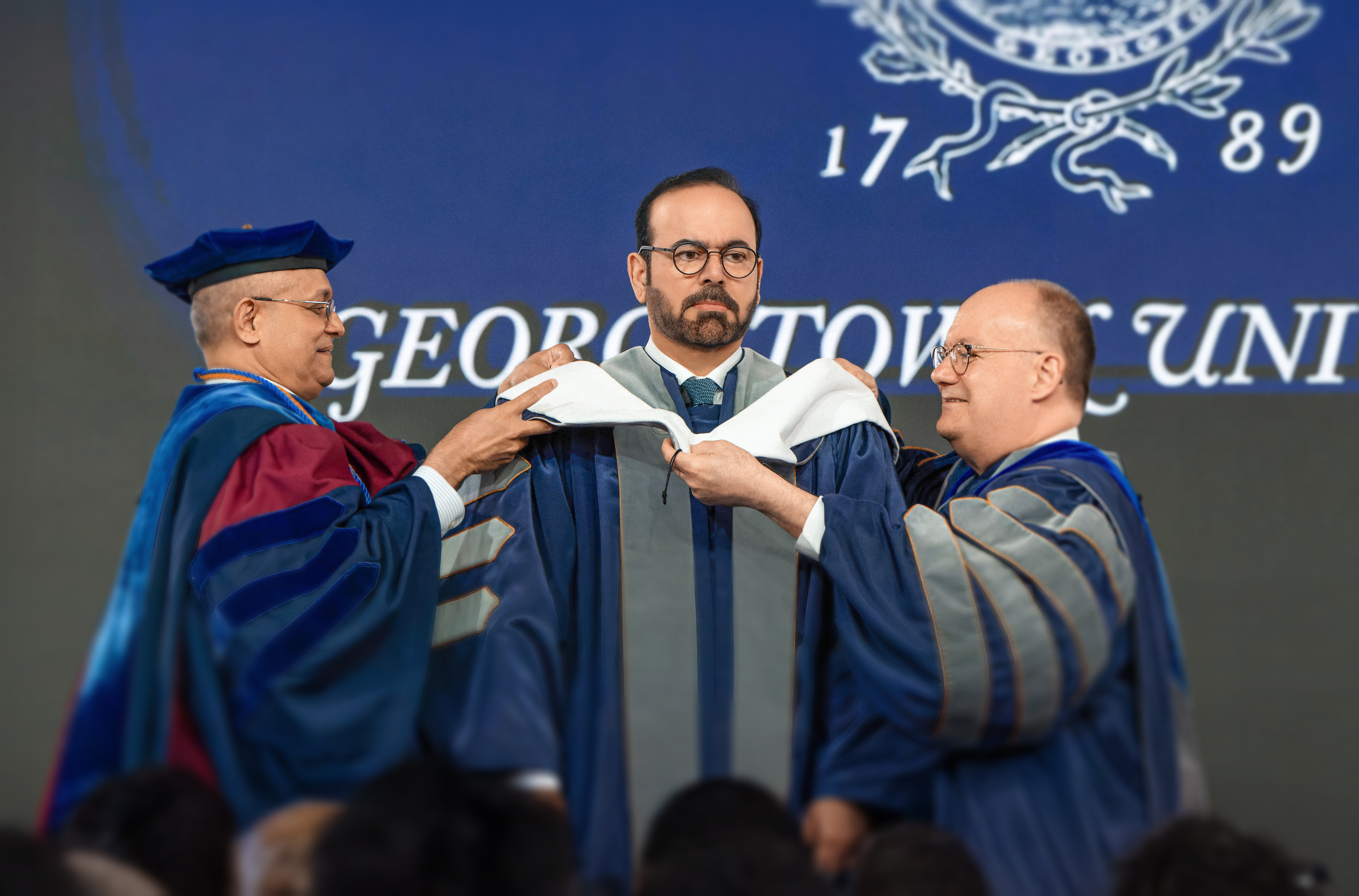
Mohammad Al Gergawi receiving an honorary doctorate from Georgetown University - 2024

Mohammed Al Gergawi has held several positions in a number of academic institutions, including membership in the UAE University Council and the Board of Trustees of Abu Dhabi University. He is also an honorary fellow at the London Business School, a member of the International Advisory Board at the American University of Beirut, a member of the Supreme Council of the National Defense College, and the founding president of the Mohammed bin Rashid School of Government in 2005.

== Media contributions ==
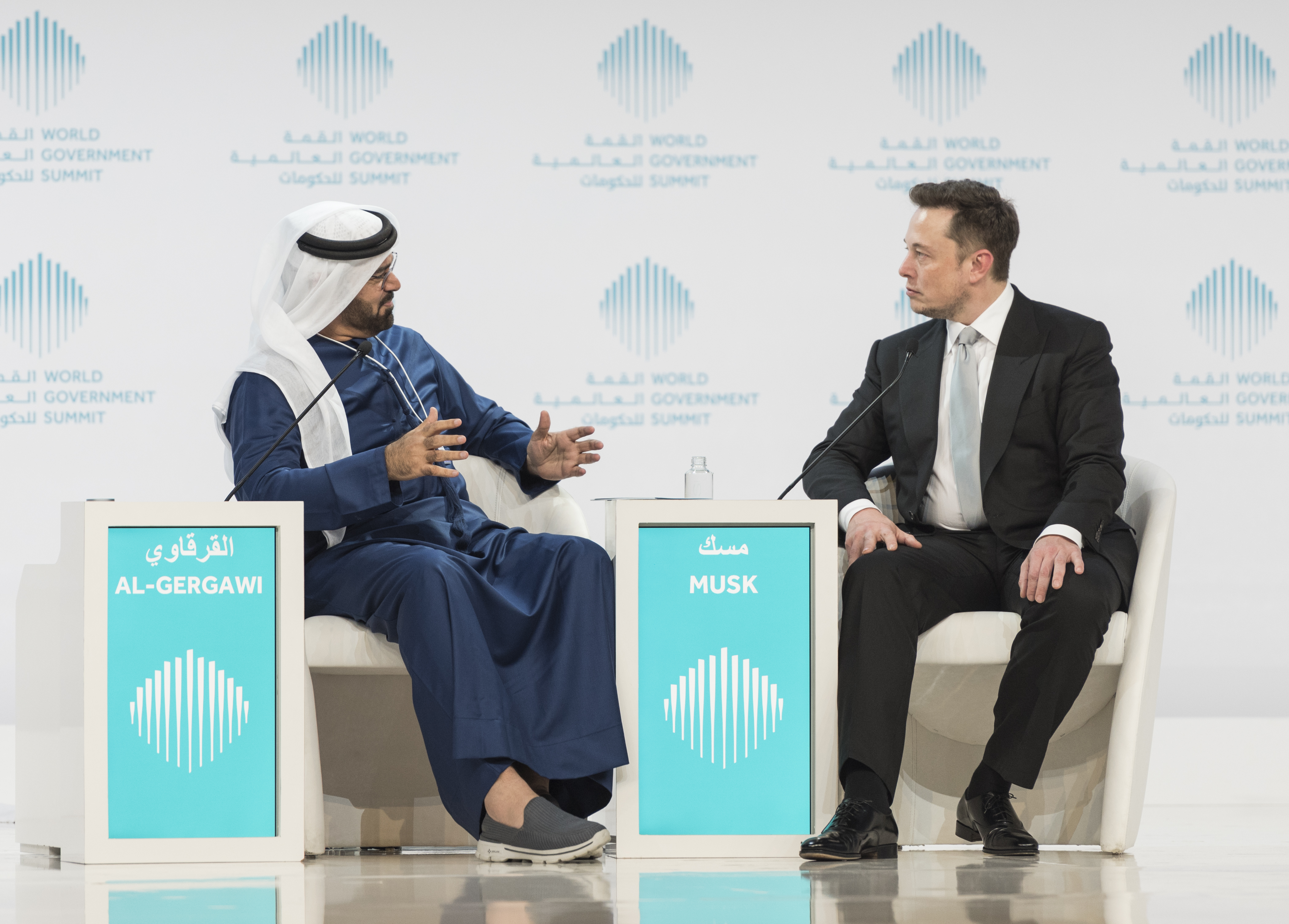
A conversation between Minister Mohammad Al Gergawi and Elon Musk during the World Government Summit, 2017

In the late 1990s, Mohammed bin Rashid Al Maktoum tasked Mohammed Al Gergawi with transforming Dubai into a global media hub, and from here a group of media projects were launched that Al Gergawi supervised the establishment of, including: Dubai Media City, the Arab Journalism Award, the Dubai Press Club, the Arab Media Forum, and the Dubai Media Incorporated. As part of his responsibilities as former Vice Chairman of the Federal National Media Council, he implemented and followed up on a number of initiatives and plans to support local media.

Within Dubai Holding, he led the efforts to establish the Arab Media Group "AMG", the Arab Radio Network, the newspaper Emarat Al Youm, Dubai Studio City, and Dubai Production City. In 2014, he managed the establishment of the Arab Social Media Award, in addition to chairing the organizing committee of the Social Media Influencers Summit. In recognition of the city's role in developing and advancing the media sector at the regional and global levels, the Council of Arab Information Ministers selected Dubai to become the Capital of Arab Media for the year 2020.
