= Telecommunications in the United Arab Emirates =

Emblem of the United Arab Emirates

Telecommunications and Digital Government Regulatory Authority, United Arab Emirates

Telecommunications in the United Arab Emirates (UAE) is under the control and supervision of the Telecommunications and Digital Government Regulatory Authority which was established under UAE Federal Law by Decree No. 3 of 2003. From 1976 to 2006 the Emirates Telecommunications Corporation (Etisalat) was the sole telephone and telecommunications provider for the UAE. And while there were exceptions for free zones and modern housing developments, for the majority of the UAE, Etisalat held a monopoly on business and personal telecommunications services. In February 2006, this monopoly became a duopoly when a new telephone company and Internet service provider (ISP), du, was established to offer mobile services across the UAE and Internet and TV services to some free zone areas. However, due to geographical distribution of service areas, the companies do not compete for customers and thus effectively operate as monopolies. Earlier du provided triple play services to free zone areas under the name Emirates Integrated Telecommunications Company (EITC), which is still its legal name.

== Telephones ==
- Land lines: 1.825 million, 61st in the world (2011)
- Mobile cellular: 17.943 million, 66th in the world (2011)
- System: modern fiber-optic integrated services; digital network with rapidly growing use of mobile-cellular telephones; key centers are Abu Dhabi and Dubai
  - Domestic: microwave radio relay, fiber optic and coaxial cable
  - International: linked to the international submarine cable FLAG (Fiber-Optic Link Around the Globe); landing point for both the SEA-ME-WE-3 and SEA-ME-WE-4 submarine cable networks; satellite earth stations - 3 Intelsat (1 Atlantic Ocean and 2 Indian Ocean) and 1 Arabsat; tropospheric scatter to Bahrain; microwave radio relay to Saudi Arabia
- Country code: 971

== Radio and television ==
- Except for the many organizations now operating in Dubai's Media Free Zone, most TV and radio stations remain government-owned; widespread use of satellite dishes provides access to pan-Arab and other international broadcasts (2007)

Radio has been around for more than 60 years in the UAE. Prior to the UAE's formation, the British Forces Broadcasting Services (BFBC) had a local FM radio studio here. It ran syndicated entertainment programmes and read news about the command to it garrisons stationed in the then Trucial States.

In the late 1970s, UAE Radio started independent services. Channel 4 was the first commercial radio station, followed by Emirates Media Radio and the Arab Media Group. As of February 2014, independent radio stations in the UAE include 7 each in English and Hindi, 12 in Arabic, 4 Malayalam, and one each in Tamil, Tagalog, Russian and Persian.

- Television broadcast stations:
  - 72 free-to-air channels (2011)
  - 33% IPTV penetration (estimated, 2011)
- Televisions: 743,133 (est. 2004), 310,000 (1997)

== Internet ==
- Penetration: 9,890,400 or 100% of the population (2020)
- Service Providers (ISPs): 2, Etisalat and du (2008)
- Hosts: 337,804 (2012)
- Top-level domain: .ae (see also: .ae Domain Administration)

== Internet censorship ==
On the du network, users who try to access a blocked web page are redirected to du's block page.

According to Freedom House, Internet in the United Arab Emirates is significantly restricted: online censorship is rampant, the Emirati government surveils online activists and journalists and uses increasingly sophisticated technology to spread disinformation that advances pro-UAE domestic and international narratives on social media, and social media users in the UAE are arrested and fined for online posts.

The government bans websites that criticize it, as well as websites with pornographic films and those perceived as anti-Islamic or anti-government/anti-police.

The United Arab Emirates censors the Internet using Secure Computing's solution. The country's ISPs Etisalat and du (telco) ban pornography, politically sensitive material and anything against the perceived moral values of the UAE. All or most VoIP services are blocked. Both WhatsApp and Snapchat calling functions were also blocked in the UAE, to comply with VoIP regulations.

TRA instructs Etisalat and du to block parts of Wikipedia, all VoIP services such as Skype and SIP based services and some social networking services like hi5, Friendster, and all dating sites like Yahoo! Personals and Match.com. A 2005 study, before du was established, also showed Etisalat sometimes block websites relating to the Baháʼí Faith.

A common method of circumventing internet censorship is by using VPN services. In March 2015, the Dubai Police declared the usage of VPN (virtual private network) illegal, saying that "tampering with the internet is a crime". Although action may not be taken against an individual for simply using a VPN, the usage of VPN combined with other illegal acts would lead to additional charges.

In March 2020, amid the COVID-19 outbreak, the government of UAE introduced a partial relaxation of the ban on VoIP services to ease communication during the lockdown. Popular instant messaging applications that remained blocked despite the removal of the ban on VoIP services included WhatsApp, FaceTime, and Skype. The selective relaxation of the ban narrowed down the user’s choice to premium (paid) services, owned by state-run telecommunication firms.

== Broadcast media censorship ==
On 16 November 2007, Tecom stopped broadcast of two major Pakistani satellite news channels, uplinked from Dubai Media City, which were initially marketed by Tecom under the tagline "Freedom to Create". The Dubai government ordered Tecom to shut down the popular independent Pakistani news channels Geo News and ARY One World on the demand of Pakistan's military regime led by General Pervez Musharraf. This was implemented by du Samacom, disabling their SDI and ASI streams. Later policymakers in Dubai permitted these channels to air their entertainment programs, but news, current affairs and political analysis were forbidden. Although subsequently the conditions were removed, marked differences have since been observed in their coverage. This incident has had a serious impact on all organizations in the media city, with Geo TV and ARY OneWorld considering relocation.

== See also ==
- Telephone numbers in the United Arab Emirates
