= Step Conference =

Annual technology festival based in UAE

- Status: Active
- Genre: Technology
- Venue: Dubai International Marine Club; Dubai Internet City
- Locations: Dubai, United Arab Emirates; Riyadh, Saudi Arabia
- Country: United Arab Emirates
- Inaugurated: 2011; 15 years ago
- Organizer: STEP
- Website: stepconference.com

Step Conference is an annual technology festival held by Step in Dubai, United Arab Emirates and Riyadh, Saudi Arabia. It is based on Dubai, United Arab Emirates.

== History ==
Step Conference was founded in 2011 by Ray Dargham after graduation from college. It is owned by the Step Group, the parent company which also runs Stepfeed. Step held their first event in 2012, with hundred attendees.

In 2015, Step Conference took place at the Dubai International Marine Club.

In 2018, the event was divided into four groups, covering digital trends, artificial intelligence, autonomous technology, and financial technology.

In 2019, more than a thousand people attended the event and the value of funds that participated was about $1 billion.

In 2020, due to the COVID-19 pandemic, the event was held virtually for the first time.

In 2022, the conference was held in Dubai Internet City.

In 2023, the event took place in Dubai Internet City. Step also unveiled its "Earth Track" at this year's conference.

At the 2024 edition of Step Conference in Dubai, a new Artificial Intelligence track was introduced, covering topics such as generative AI, machine learning, and regulatory frameworks. The event hosted over 8,000 attendees and featured discussions on the growing impact of AI across various industries in the MENA region. At Step Conference 2024, Tecom Group’s in5 showcased ten innovative startups, including BitAffix, ReflowX, Writefully, Arabiatee, Estaie, and others, while announcing AED 3 billion in total funding raised in 2023.

At Step Conference 2025, held at Dubai Internet City, the Dubai Land Department outlined plans to develop the emirate as a hub for real estate innovation. It announced a partnership with Step to support the attraction of global PropTech entrepreneurs and investors.
