= .ae =

Top-level Internet domain for the UAE

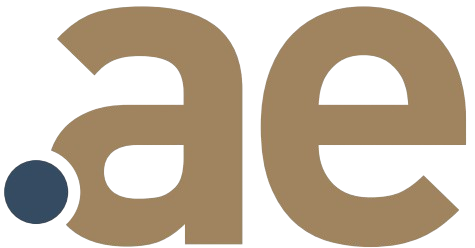
- Introduced: 1 December 1992
- TLD type: Country code top-level domain
- Status: Active
- Registry: .aeDA
- Sponsor: TDRA
- Intended use: Entities connected with the United Arab Emirates
- Actual use: Very popular in the United Arab Emirates
- Registration restrictions: (only applicable to registrations under third level) Local presence. Must present documentation: business registration, certificate from relevant ministry (for co.ae; net.ae; org.ae; sch.ae; govu.ae; gov.ae; and mil.ae).
- Structure: Names can be registered directly at the second level; third-level registrations are also available under some second-level labels
- Documents: ae Domain Name Eligibility Policy
- Dispute policies: UAE Domain Name DRP
- DNSSEC: No
- Registry website: tdra.gov.ae/en/aeda

.ae is the country code top-level domain (ccTLD) in the Domain Name System of the Internet for the United Arab Emirates (UAE). It is administered by .aeDA which is part of the Telecommunications and Digital Government Regulatory Authority (TDRA) of the UAE.

The internationalised country code top-level domain in the Arabic alphabet of the UAE is امارات., which is romanised as emarat. It is represented as .xn--mgbaam7a8h in Punycode.

== Second and third level domain registrations ==
The domain ae is administered by the Telecommunications and Digital Government Regulatory Authority (TDRA) of the UAE. Registrations are permitted directly at the second level (unrestricted zone) or at the third level (restricted zone) beneath several category labels. During 1995–2003 co.ae was used for commercial entities, but this has been deprecated by the UAE Network Information Center (UAEnic) in 2003 in preference to the commercial use of second-level registrations; existing co.ae registrations were allowed to be retained if their registrants so desire. During 2008 when ae was re-delegated to the TRA, the .aeDA published new policies in which co.ae was introduced only for local commercial companies provided that the name is connected to the business name.

== Re-delegation of .ae ==
The .AE domain was originally delegated to UUNET. Recognising the domain should be administered in the country, the domain was transferred in 1995 to Etisalat, following a brief period of administration by the United Arab Emirates University. Since that time, Etisalat, through its division the UAE Network Information Center (UAEnic), has been responsible for the operation of the .ae domain.

During GITEX 2006, TDRA announced that the .ae ccTLD management and operations will be re-delegated to TDRA from Etisalat/UAEnic, the current .ae ccTLD manager. A new entity called .ae Domain Administration (.aeDA) has been formed to take care of management and operations of .ae based on latest DNS and Domain Registry technologies. During January 2008, IANA officially re-delegated the .ae Domain to the TDRA.

On 3 August 2008, the .aeDA took over the DNS and launched their services with the new registry system which supports registry–registrar model. Currently the .aeDA has accredited eight registrars from different parts of the world. For the first time, Internet users in the UAE will be able to register and manage their domain names under .ae automatically using an online system without going through manual process which used to take up to six weeks for domain registrations. As per .aeDA policies, current domain holders are allowed to transfer between registrars at no cost.

.ae was the first ccTLD in the Arab region to use the standard Registry-Registrar model. As well, .aeDA is the first registry in the region to use the industry-standard Extensible Provisioning Protocol to manage its domains.

== Accredited registrars ==
As of 6 December 2020, there are 22 accredited registrars:

- Lexsynergy
- Etisalat
- Du
- Gatehills
- Ascio
- Instra Corporation
- Mark Monitor
- Corporation Service Company (Singapore)
- BUZINESSWARE
- AEserver
- InterNetworX
- CPS-Datensysteme
- Safenames
- Internetx
- 101Domain
- Host Arabia t/a Tasjeel.ae
- Abu-Ghazaleh
- Marcaria
- BB-Online
- DREAMSCAPE
- EPAG

== Transfer between registrars ==
Registrants (domain name holders) can transfer their domains from one registrar to another provided that they obtain a domain name password. Domain name passwords can be recovered online through .aeDA's website password-recovery.aeda.net.ae. After obtaining this password, registrants can supply this password to the gaining registrar who will be able to transfer it directly without dealing with the losing registrar. Losing registrars are prohibited from charging a fee when a domain transfer occur; however gaining registrars may do so.

== Domain name pricing ==
.ae domain name retail prices ranges from 30 USD to 200 USD depending on the provider and the level of support and services provided with the domain name.

The .ae registration prices have noticeably dropped since the introduction of .aeDA. Prior to 3 August 2008, .ae domains were offered by Etisalat for around 41 USD per year while ac.ae, org.ae, gov.ae and sch.ae were offered for around 20 USD per year. International providers used to charge around 100–200 USD in order to cover the administrative cost involved in the manual registration process.

After .aeDA's go-live in August 2008, .ae registration price declined to as low as 30 USD with international registrars.

== Domain name count ==
On 16-Sep-2012 aeDA made an announcement on reaching the 100,000 registration mark in domain names. During Gitex2008, .aeDA domain name counter showed over 90,000 domain names currently held in the registry, making it the largest ccTLD registry in the Arab region. As of May 2023, there are more than 300,000+ domains in the zone.

== IDN and Arabic domain names ==
On 2 March 2009, The UAE's Ministerial Council for Services passed a proposal by the Telecommunications and Digital Government Regulatory Authority (TDRA) to register the domain address of 'Emarat' in Arabic script (امارات) for the country's Arabic domains, stating that the domain will contribute to increasing the number of Internet users visiting Arabic sites and further promote and strengthen the UAE's identity.

During ICANN meeting no. 35 (21–26 June 2009) in Sydney, .aeDA representatives mentioned that aeDA's EPP-based registry system is fully compatible with IDN protocols and guidelines.

In January 2010 ICANN announced that the UAE IDN ccTLD (DNS name: xn—mgbaam7a8h, امارات) was one of the first four new IDN ccTLDs to have passed the Fast Track String Evaluation within the domain application process.

== ENUM of UAE (+971) ==
.aeDA, the registry operator of .ae is also the official operator for UAE ENUM Space (971). The ENUM space was redelegated from the incumbent operator Etisalat since 16 April 2009.
