= Park Key Parking =

United Arab Emirates parking company

Park Key
- Company type: Privately held company
- Founded: 2016
- Founder: Adnan Masood
- Area served: United Arab Emirates
- Products: Parking
- Services: Parking
- Website: parkkey.com

Park Key (Parking) is an online platform connecting parking seekers with parking providers through its website and mobile app. Drivers can search, book, and pay for parking spots on-demand for varying time periods throughout the country. Park Key is currently available in United Arab Emirates and very popular in Dubai, Abu Dhabi and Sharjah with plans to roll out in key international markets. The medium of this service has been compared to Airbnb or Booking.com, in terms of parking.

== Origins ==
Park Key started operation in March 2016. It was founded by Adnan Masood who worked as head of marketing at du (company) telecom. Adnan faced shortage of parking spaces near work in Dubai Internet City and observed that many people in Dubai are facing same problem. He also noticed that although many residents struggle to find parking, there are many parking spots sitting vacant in buildings nearby. Driven by the desire to solve a significant local problem, Park Key was established with the intention of solving parking shortage and making it convenient to book parking with a click of button.
