= Emarat =

Top-level domain

امارات
- Introduced: 2010
- TLD type: Internationalised country code top-level domain
- Status: Sunrise Period
- Registry: .aeDA
- Sponsor: Telecommunications Regulatory Authority
- Intended use: Entities connected with United Arab Emirates
- Registered domains: 1,096 (7 March 2024)
- Registration restrictions: Arabic script
- Documents: dotEmarat Domain Name Policy
- Dispute policies: UAE Domain Name Dispute Resolution Policy
- DNS name: xn--mgbaam7a8h
- Registry website: عربي.امارات

The Arabic name امارات, romanized as emarat, is the internationalized country code top-level domain for the United Arab Emirates. The ASCII name of this domain in the Domain Name System of the Internet is xn--mgbaam7a8h, using the Internationalizing Domain Names in Applications (IDNA) procedure in the translation of the Unicode representation of the script version. The domain was installed in the Domain Name System on 5 May 2010.

The first second-level sub domain is عربي.امارات which is transliterated as arabi.emarat.

The United Arab Emirates is also assigned the country code top-level domain .ae.

The dotEmarat Sunrise Period started from 17 October 2010 for a duration of 2 months, ending on 15 December 2010. This period was exclusively for all registered trademark owners to apply for a dotEmarat domain name.
