= Dergham =

Dergham, Dargham, or Dirgham (Arabic: ضِرْغَام Arabic: درغام), is a given name and a surname literally meaning brave but also used as an Arabic epithet for lion. Notable people with the name include:

- Dirgham (fl. 1153–1164), Arab military commander
- Anissa Abi-Dargham (fl. early 21st century), American psychiatrist and researcher
- Joseph Dergham (1930–2015), Lebanese Bishop
- Joseph Dergham El Khazen (died 1742), 60th Maronite Patriarch of Antioch
- Raghida Dergham (born 1953), Lebanese-American journalist
- Ray Dargham (fl. early 21st century), Lebanese American businessperson
