= Ray Dargham =

Ray Dargham is a Lebanese American businessperson who is the co-founder and chief executive officer (CEO) of Step Group.

== Early life and education ==
Ray Dargham was born and raised in Lebanon. He developed an early interest in entrepreneurship, participating in a Junior Achievement program in high school that introduced him to running a mini company. Later, he studied at the American University of Beirut (AUB) and graduated with a bachelor's degree in economics. After graduating, he relocated to Dubai to pursue better opportunities.

== Career ==
Dargham co-founded the Step Conference in Dubai in 2012, shortly after graduating. Initially a small gathering of around 100 participants in a local co-working space, the conference quickly expanded, moving to larger venues such as the Dubai International Marine Club by 2015 due to its growing prominence in the tech community.

Dargham later formed Step Group, launching digital platforms such as StepFeed and YallaFeed, which focused on technology, business, and pop culture news in the Middle East. He also co-founded Spiderfrogs, a tech company that provides consultancy on digital trends.

Under his leadership, the Step Conference expanded from its original format to an event drawing thousands of attendees by 2024. It introduced specialized tracks, including fintech, digital media, and AI, and launched a Saudi edition in Riyadh in 2019. During the COVID-19 pandemic, Step adapted with online and hybrid formats.
