= List of media outlets in Dubai Media City =

This is a list of TV and radio stations, newspapers, magazines, websites and advertising agencies based at Dubai Media City.

== TV stations ==
- Fatafeat
- Citruss TV
- CNBC Arabia
- Blinx Media Hub

== Online News Magazines ==
- Khaleej Mag
- Khaleej Times
