= The Emirates Academy of Hospitality Management =

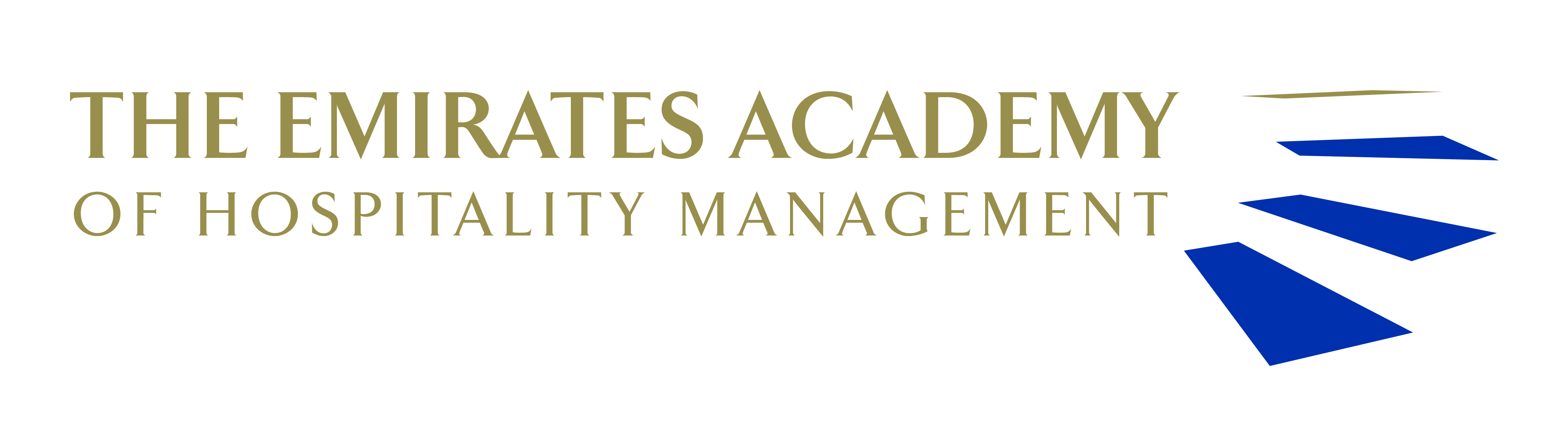
- Type: Hospitality Higher Education Institution
- Established: 2001 - 2025
- Academic staff: 45
- Location: Dubai, United Arab Emirates
- Language: English
- Website: emiratesacademy.edu

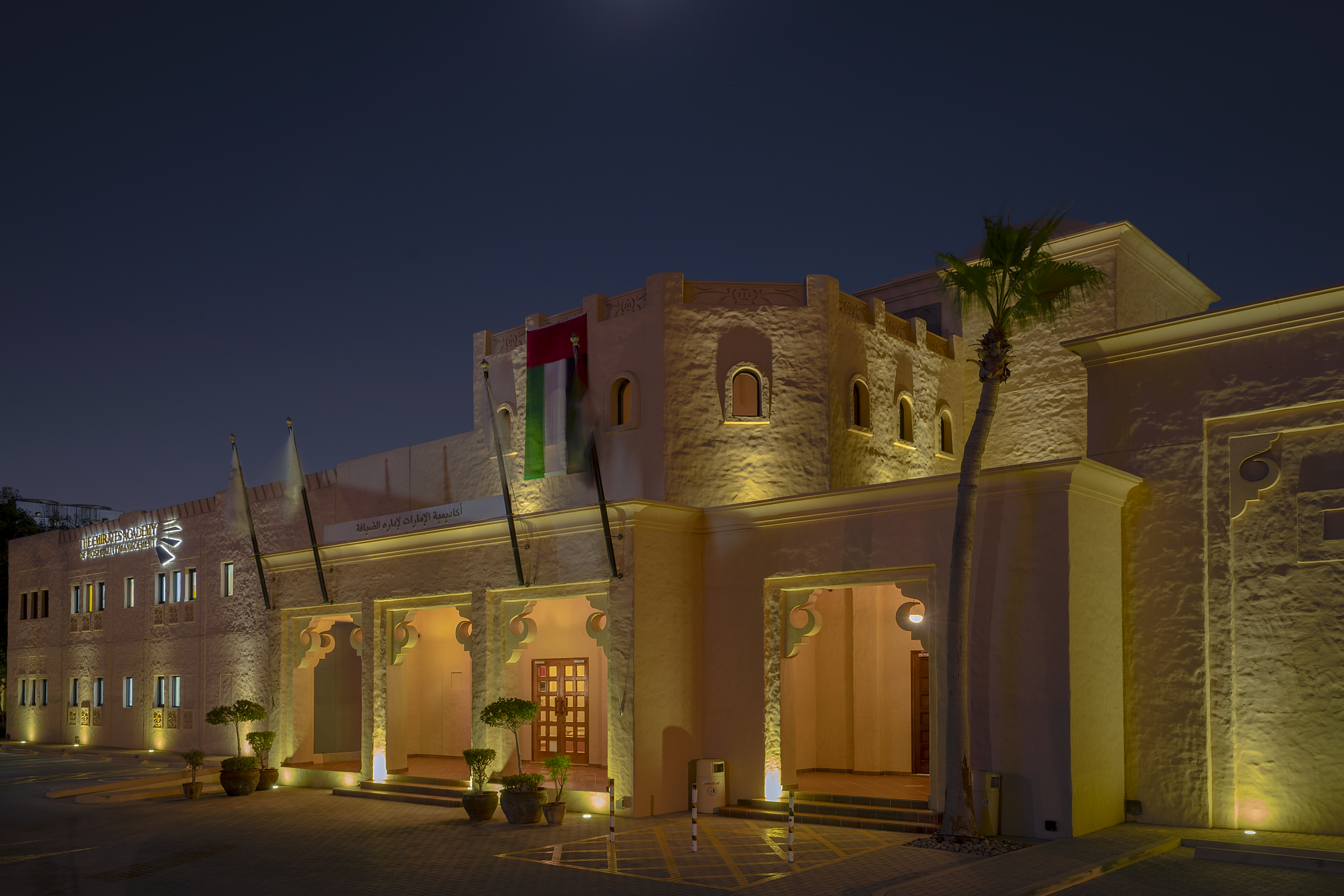
EAHM

The Emirates Academy of Hospitality Management (EAHM) in Dubai is the first and only home-grown hospitality management university in the Middle East. The university is part of the Jumeirah Group and Dubai Holding which holds hotels such as the Burj Al Arab, Jumeirah Beach Hotel, and the Madinat Jumeirah heritage and leisure complex. EAHM offers undergraduate and postgraduate levels programmes along with short courses and Executive programmes.As of 28th July 2025, The Emirates Academy of Hospitality Management has officially concluded its operations following a strategic decision.

For any inquiries related to academic records, please contact the Ministry of Education and Scientific Research directly.

== History ==
The EAHM was created as part of the emirate of Dubai strategy to develop hospitality and tourism as a key economic sector in the late 1990s. The campus first opened its doors in October 2001 for the delivery of undergraduate programmes. EAHM formed an academic association with École Hôtelière de Lausanne until 2019. By 2005, EAHM had introduced a postgraduate programme, while the first batch of Bachelors and Associate degree students graduated.

In 2025 , the institution was permanently closed.

== Programmes ==
The Emirates Academy offers degrees on both undergraduate and postgraduate levels.

Undergraduate Programmes

Bachelor of Business Administration (BBA) in International Hospitality Management^{[1]}

This is a 3-year BBA programme in International Hospitality Management. It is developed and delivered using experiential learning approaches. As part of the curriculum it is inclusive of a first internship placement for 6-month at the end of the first year, and a final management level internship in the last term of studies.

Postgraduate Programmes

Master of International Hospitality Management (MIHM)

1-year of coursework in Dubai, followed by an independent research project. Accredited Master's programme in International Hospitality Management.

== Continuous Professional Development and Consultancy ==
The Professional Training & Development department offers training and certifications courses in hospitality management for professionals and for amateurs, such as Financial Management, Wine and Beverage, Food & Beverage and Restaurant Management, Customer Service, Marketing, Operations Management, Project Management or Human Resources. Several courses are offering international recognition such as WSET Global.

== Campus and Facilities ==
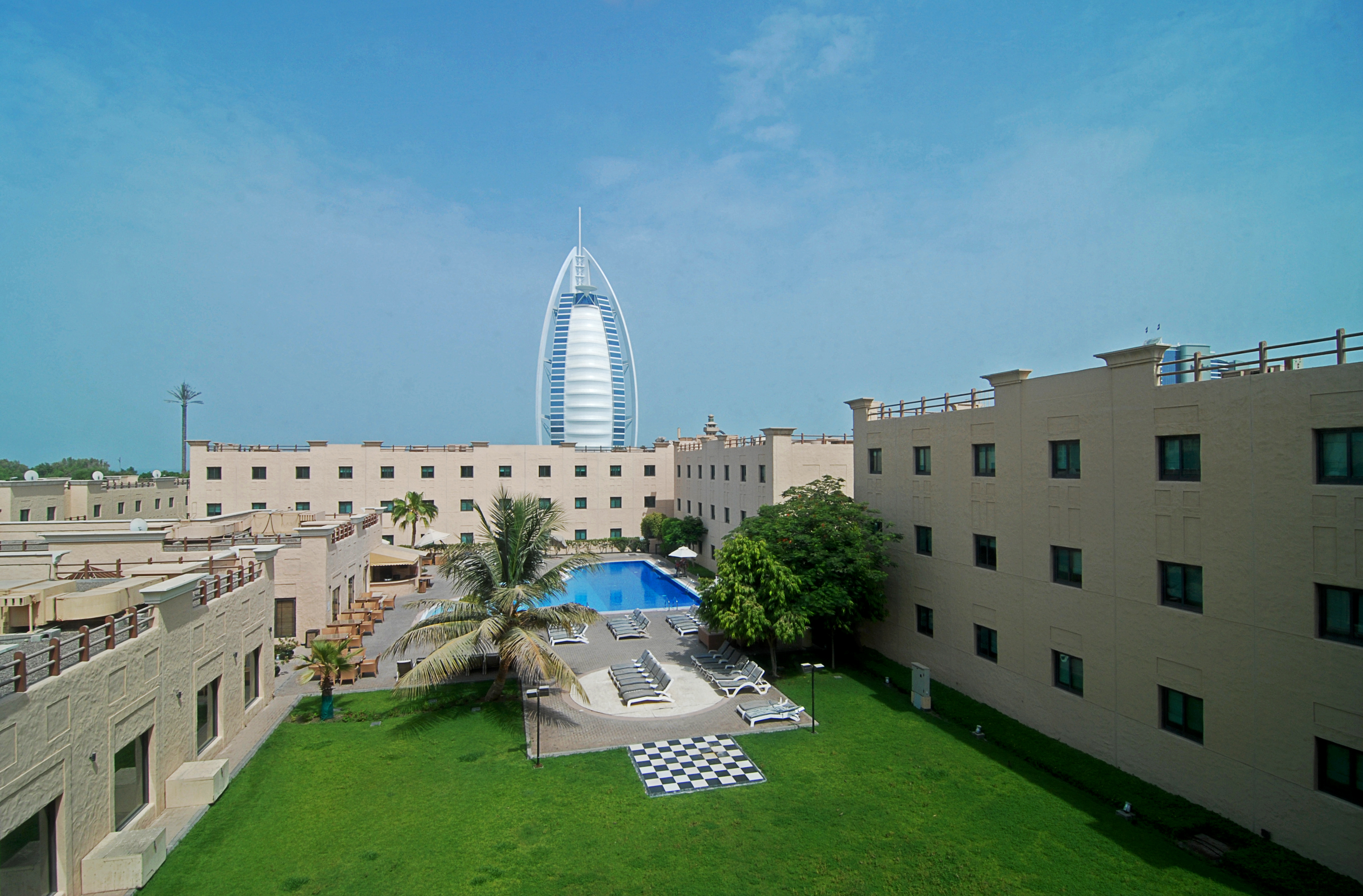
EAHM Campus

The campus consists of a number of resort-style living facilities for the residents : gym, swimming pool, multi sport and tennis courts, recreation room, prayer rooms, cafes and restaurants. Guest housing option is available as well for external guests affiliated with EAHM or the Jumeirah Group.

== Accreditations and Rankings ==
All programmes of study are accredited by the UAE Ministry of Education. EAHM is also an accredited member of The International Centre of Excellence in Tourism and Hospitality Education (THE-ICE) in Australia, and of the Institute of Hospitality (IoH) in the United Kingdom.

The Emirates Academy of Hospitality Management is ranked 9th by the QS World University Rankings for Hospitality and Leisure in 2024, and was ranked 13th in 2023

== See also ==
- Education in the United Arab Emirates
