= Etisalat Prize for Innovation =

- Awarded for: Most Innovative Product/Service or Idea
- Sponsored by: Etisalat Nigeria (2012)
- Location: Nigeria
- Presented by: Etisalat Prize for Innovation
- First award: 2012
- Website: Website

The Etisalat Prize for Innovation was created by Etisalat Nigeria in 2012, aimed at encouraging and celebrating valuable innovation in the African market. The prize is annually awarded in two categories, both with the purpose of driving or facilitating mobile broadband utilisation in Africa. The first prize of $25,000 is for the most innovative product or service launched in the previous year and a second prize of $10,000 for the most innovative idea.

== Entry criteria ==
Entries for the award must show a demonstrable impact on broadband usage, notable uptake from customers and have a visible commercial impact in the community. Entries are open to innovative Broadband products or services using the GSM network family (2G GPRS & EDGE, 3G, HSPA, LTE) including Value Added Service providers, App Developers and other service providers making use of mobile broadband capability.

== Winners and nominees ==
The first edition of the Etisalat Prize for Innovation announced the shortlist of four nominees in October 2012, two nominees in both the Most Innovative Product/Service category and the Most Innovative Idea category. The winners for each category were announced at the 2012 AfricaCom Awards in Cape Town, South Africa.

=== Most Innovative Product/Service 2012 ===
- Mobile Maths Practice (winner) – Olaseni Odebiyi
- TVplus – Olalekan Ayorinde

=== Most Innovative Idea 2012 ===
- i-Connect Project (winner) – Oyehmi Begho
- Cartoon Afrik – Ololade Babalola

=== Most Innovative Product/Service 2013 ===
- Genni Games (winner)
- Spantree SpanBox ONE

=== Most Innovative Idea 2013 ===
- Efiwe Mobile Application (winner)- Uche Okocha
- Quality & Cheap Education for all

=== Most Innovative Product/Service 2014 ===
- Exammate Application (winner)
- Akpos Mobile Application

=== Most Innovative Idea 2014 ===
- IMID Mobile Application (winner)
- Mamalette

=== Most Innovative Product/Service 2015 ===
- Studylab maths (winner) – Obi Brown
- Digital Back Books

=== Most Innovative Idea 2015 ===
- Dedicated Traffic Mapping Device (winner) – Chijioke Ezegbo
- Traffigator Tech

=== Most Innovative Product/Service 2016 ===
- OneMedical/Helium Healthcare (winner) – Adegoke Olubusi

=== Most Innovative Idea 2016 ===
- Dresses By Aloli (winner) – Tobilola Ajibola
