= TECOM Group =

Emirati business group

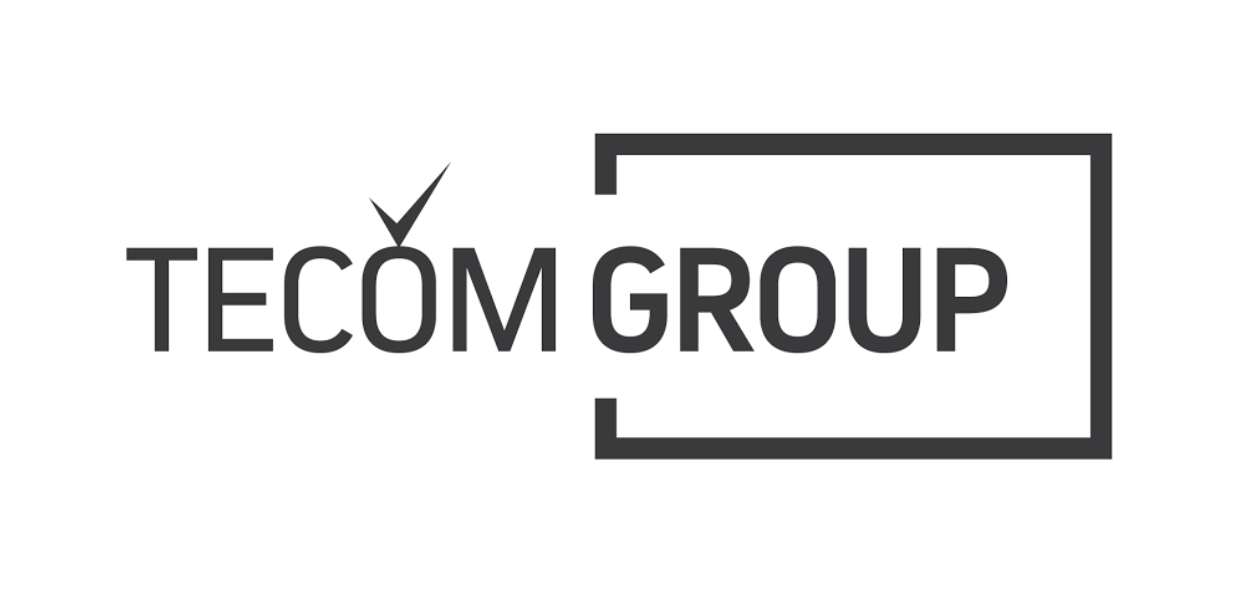
- Type: Public
- Traded as: DFM: TECOM
- Industry: Real estate
- Founded: 2005
- Headquarters: Dubai Studio City, Commercial Building 1, Dubai, UAE
- Key people: Malek Al Malek, (Chairman); Abdulla Belhoul, (CEO)
- Owner: Dubai Holding
- Subsidiaries: Dubai Internet City; Dubai Outsource City; Dubai Media City; Dubai Studio City; Dubai Production City; Dubai Knowledge Park; Dubai Academic City; Dubai Science Park; Dubai Industrial City; Dubai Design District; Emirates Towers District
- Website: www.tecomgroup.ae

TECOM Group PJSC is a public company headquartered in Dubai, the United Arab Emirates, and traded on the Dubai Financial Market (DFM) under the symbol TECOM. Before the IPO, TECOM Group was a member-owned by Dubai Holding, a UAE state-owned enterprise. Dubai Holding remains one of the stakeholders of TECOM Group.

As of 2023, TECOM Group's portfolio consisted of 10 business districts catering to companies operating in design, education, manufacturing, media, science, and technology.

== History ==
TECOM Group has been developing business districts and associated facilities in Dubai since 1999. The group has worked with the Dubai Government on Dubai Design District, Dubai Industrial City, Dubai Internet City, Dubai Industrial City, and Dubai Science Park. TECOM manages Dubai Internet City, Dubai Media City, Dubai Studio City and Dubai International Academic City. Dubai Design District (d3) is also a part of the group's themed developments portfolio, located adjacent to the Business Bay area. Emirates Towers District is the latest addition to the group's portfolio of business communities.

The group launched an innovation strategy worth AED 4.5 billion to create infrastructure and drive entrepreneurship. This includes developing innovative parks, creative spaces, technology laboratories, and smart buildings, launching new business incubators, and establishing a start-up fund to stimulate innovation. As part of this, the group launched a new platform for entrepreneurs and media start-ups. The group first invested in incubation and innovation centers in 2013, within Dubai Internet City, which has since worked with more than 20,000 people on hackathons, competitions, and community events.

TECOM Group has collaborated with the UAE’s Ministry of Industry and Advanced Technology (MOIAT) to facilitate the country’s decarbonization efforts. It is also working on developing a freight terminal for the UAE’s national railway project, Etihad Rail.

In June 2022, the Group announced its intention to float on the DFM, subsequently raising $1.67 billion from an IPO. It started trading on the DFM in July 2022.

In February 2018, Malek Al Malek took over as Group CEO of TECOM Group, replacing Dr. Amina Al Rustamani. After the public listing, Al Malek was named Chairman of the Group. Abdulla Belhoul is the present CEO of TECOM Group.

== Financial performance ==
For the year 2022, Tecom Group posted a net profit of AED 725.6 million.

== Business platforms ==
- In5
- D/Quarters
- GoFreelance
- Marketplace
- AXS
