= Dubai Internet City =

Information technology park in Dubai

Coordinates: 25.095°N 55.160°E

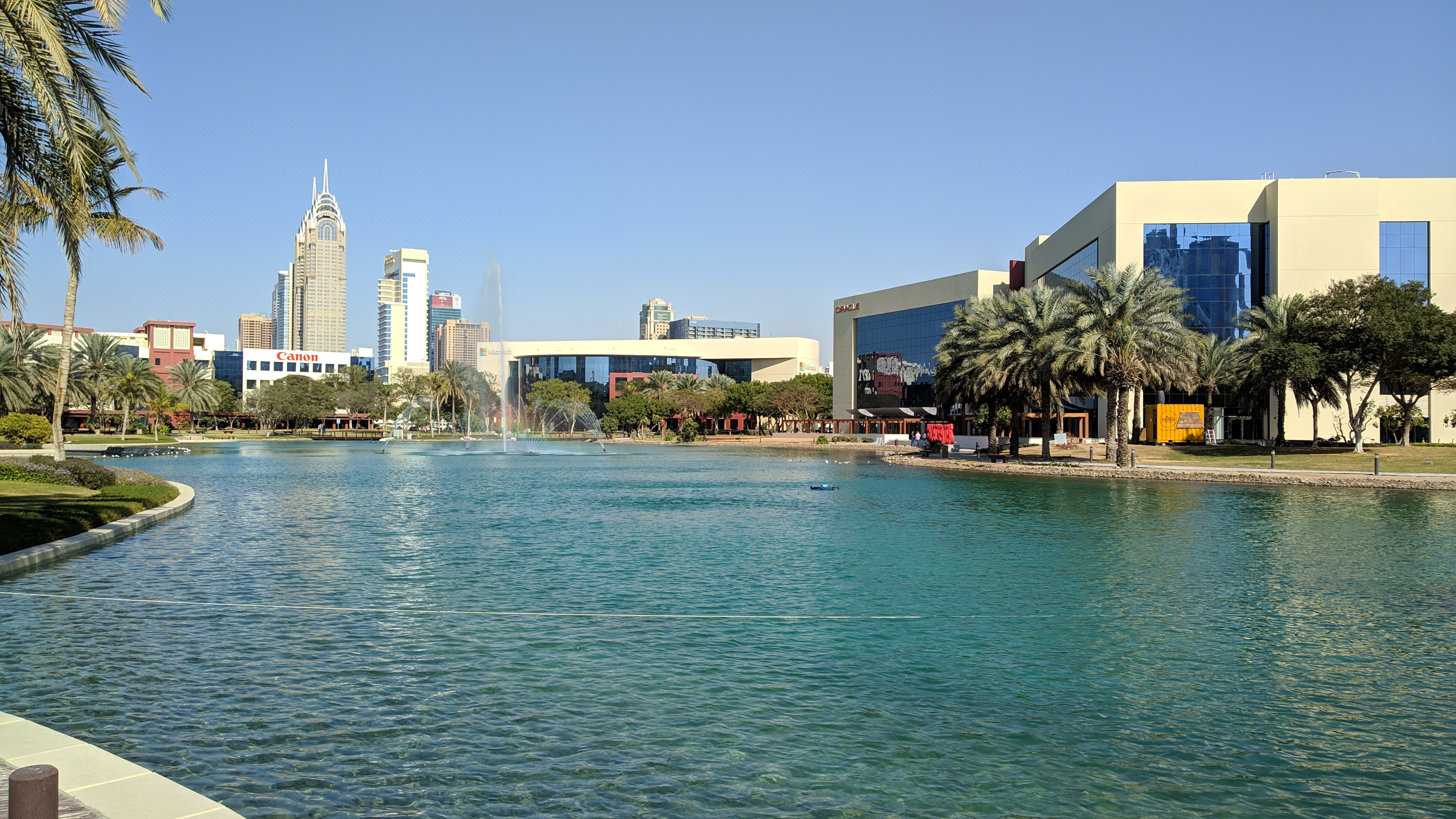
- Company type: Free Economic Zone
- Founded: 1999
- Headquarters: Dubai, United Arab Emirates
- Owner: Dubai Holding

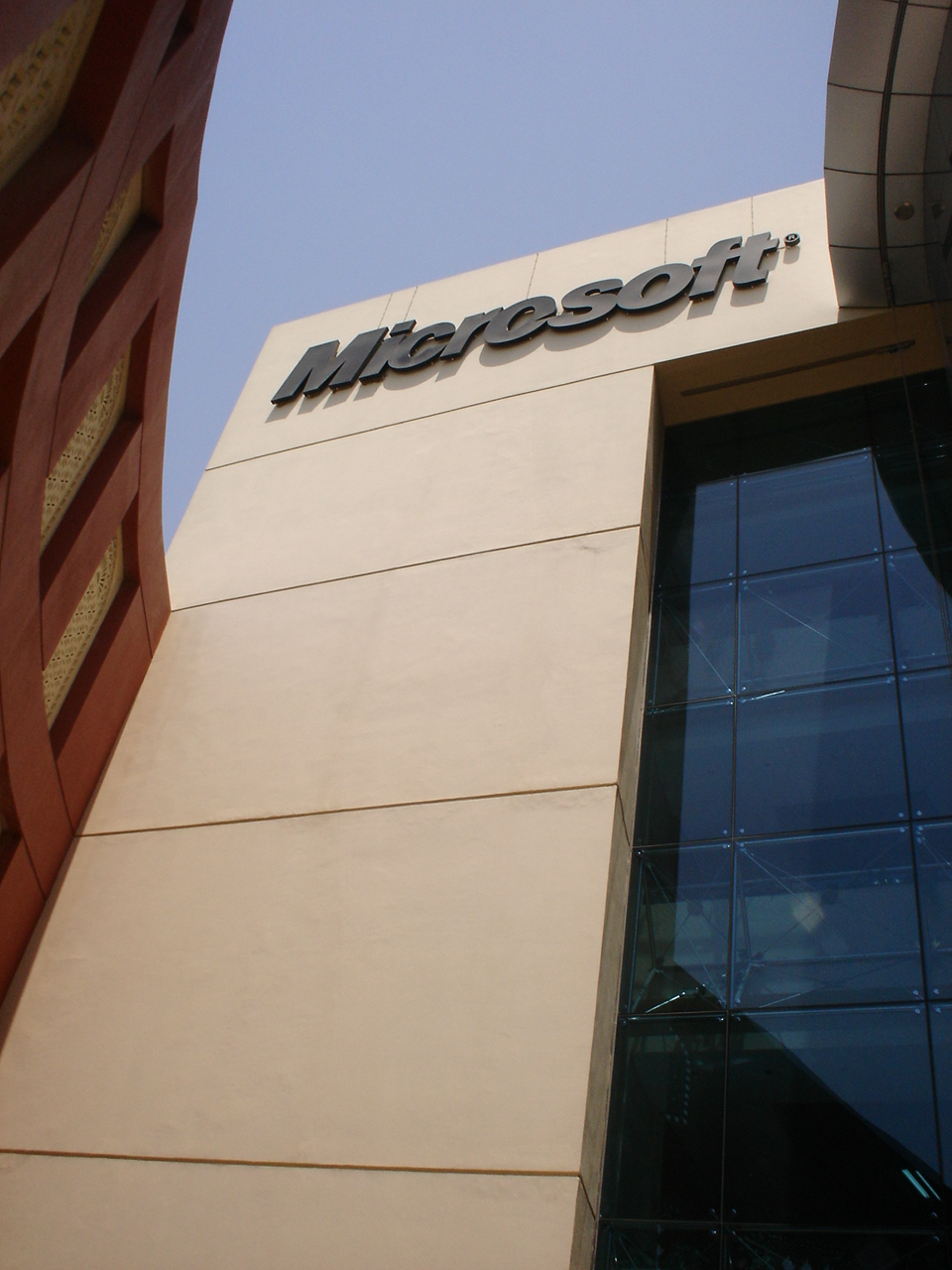
The Microsoft sign at the entrance of the Dubai Microsoft campus, Dubai Internet City.

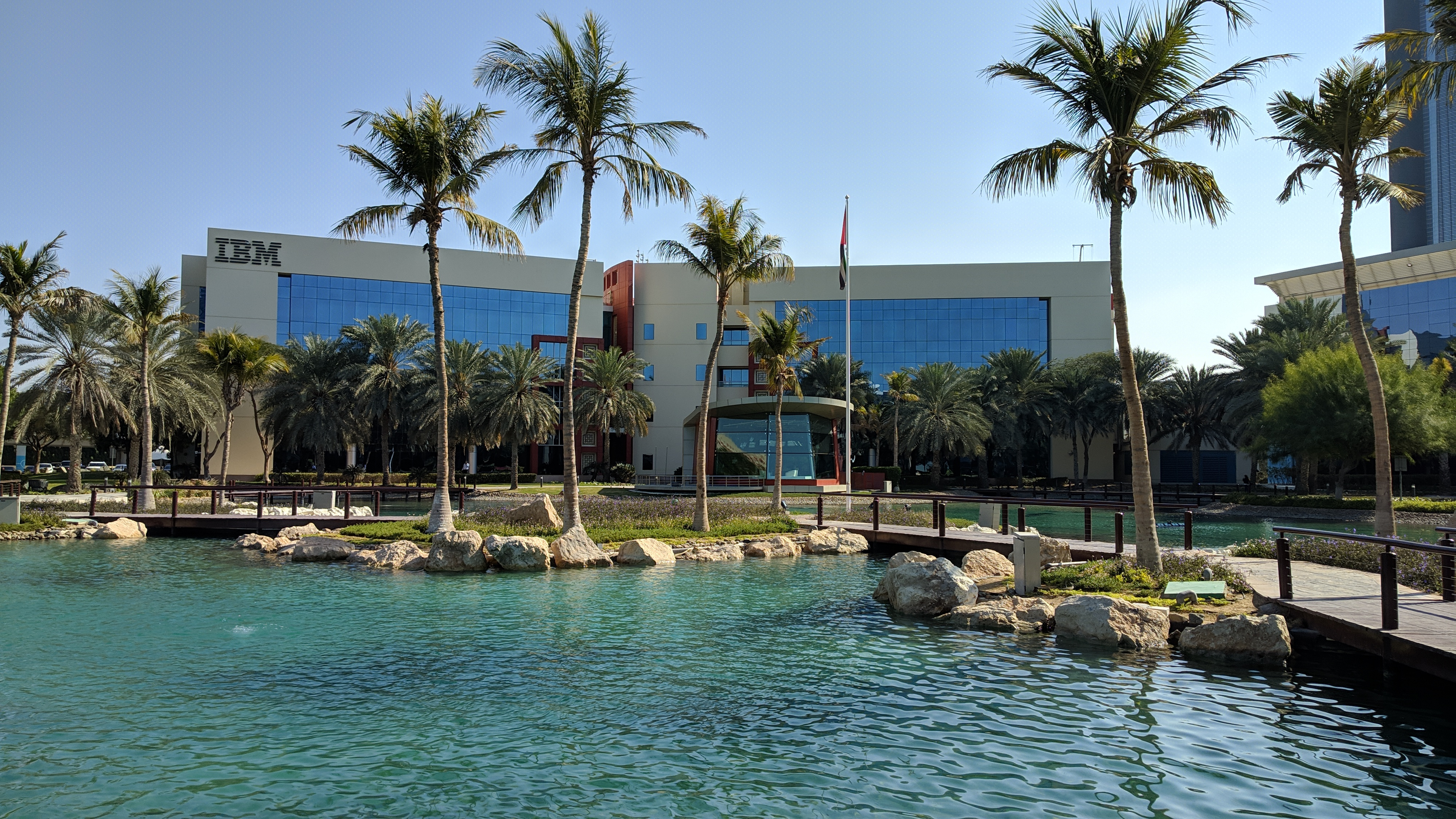
IBM building as seen from the Dubai Internet City amphitheatre.

Dubai Internet City (DIC) (Arabic: مدينة دبي للإنترنت) is a neighborhood and an information technology and business park created by the Government of Dubai as a free economic zone in Dubai, United Arab Emirates.

== History ==
Dubai Internet City, a member of Dubai Holding subsidiary TECOM Investments, was founded in October 1999, and it opened its doors in October 2000. It was established by Sheikh Mohammed bin Rashid Al Maktoum. It housed 100 companies at the time of launch. In August 2000, Siemens Business Services (SBS), Cisco, and Sun Microsystems received Dubai Internet City’s first major infrastructure contracts.

Dubai Internet City, launched in 1999, is a technology district in Dubai that hosts offices, research centers, and facilities used by global companies and startups.

As of 2019, Dubai Internet City housed over 1,600 companies and has become the regional base of many of the world's news agencies as well as the main digital content generator for Arabic media.

Data center infrastructure provider Khazna announced it was establishing two new data centers in Dubai Internet City in 2022. In the same year, Intel announced the opening of its first artificial intelligence research and development center at Dubai Internet City. Visa established its headquarters for the CEMEA region and technology conglomerate Meta Platforms also established its regional headquarters in the UAE at Dubai Internet City in 2022.

In 2023, Dubai Internet City signed a strategic partnership with German Entrepreneurship GmbH to provide support to German start-up companies seeking to do business in Dubai. In the same year, technology company Yango expanded its offices into Dubai Internet City.

The economic rules of Dubai Internet City allow companies to be exempt from all taxes and customs duty for a period of 50 years guaranteed by law. The park’s status as a free economic zone also allows it to offer 100% foreign ownership, similar to other designated economic zones in the United Arab Emirates.

These freedoms have led many global information technology firms, such as Facebook, LinkedIn, Google, Dell, Intel, Huawei, Samsung, SAP, Microsoft, IBM, Oracle Corporation, Tata Consultancy, 3M, Sun Microsystems, Cisco, HP, Nokia, Cognizant, Accenture, Hisense and as well as UAE-based companies such as Tecom Group, Ducont, to move their regional base to the DIC. DIC is located adjacent to other industrial clusters such as Dubai Media City and Dubai Knowledge Park (formerly Dubai Knowledge Village).

Dubai Internet City is a frequent participant in the GITEX GLOBAL trade show.

TECOM Group has expanded its Innovation Hub in Dubai Internet City adding new premium office space as demand from global tech firms grows.

== Location ==
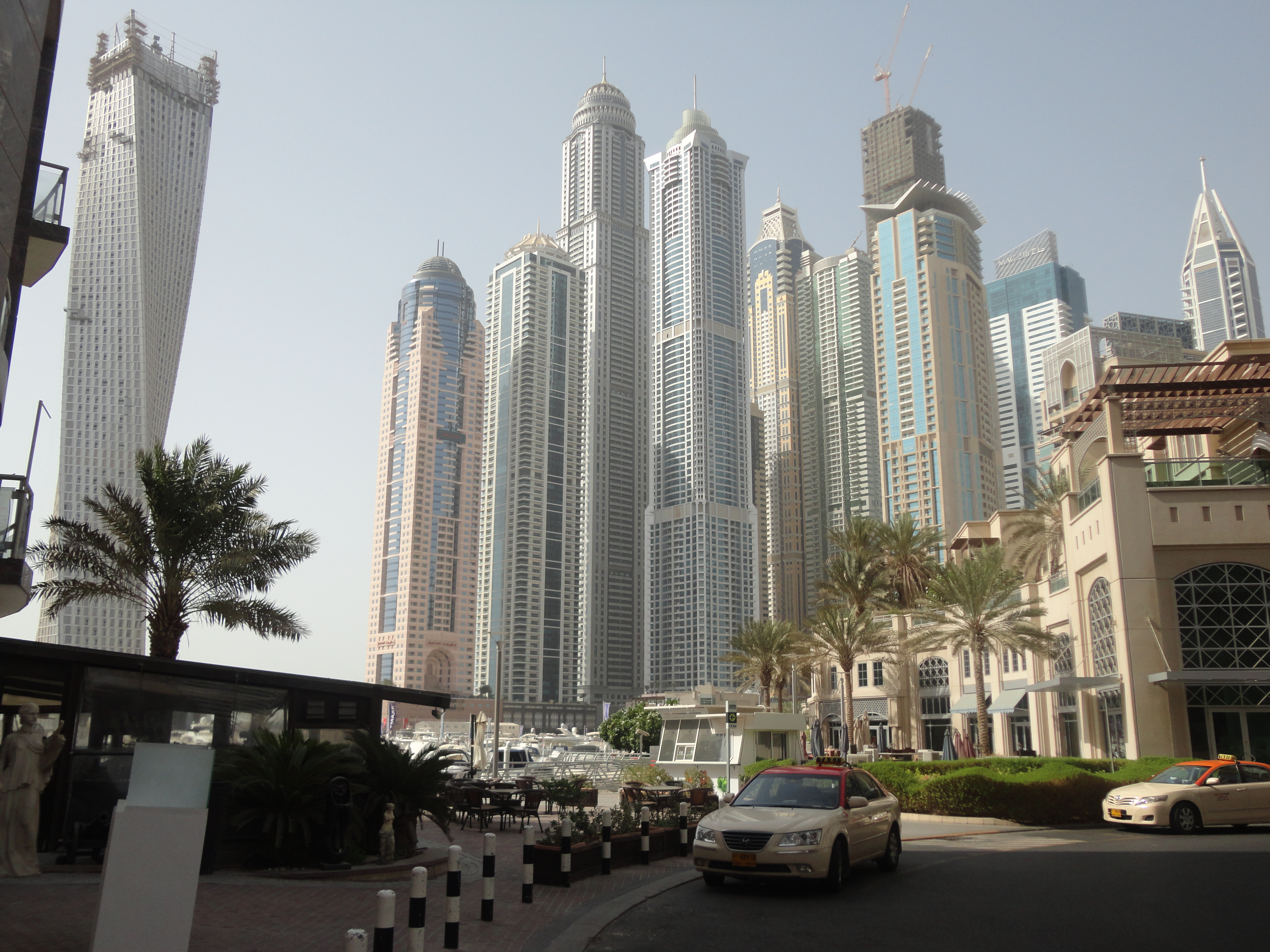
View of Dubai Marina from Dubai Internet City.

Dubai Internet City is about 25 kilometres south of downtown Dubai city, on Sheikh Zayed Road between Dubai and Abu Dhabi. It is located adjacent to Dubai Marina, Jumeirah Beach Residence and the well-known Palm Jumeirah, areas which are rapidly becoming three of the most exclusive (and expensive) residential areas of Dubai. DIC is less than 1 km away from the sea coast and is near several five-star hotels. The nearest metro station is the eponymous Dubai Internet City station on the Red Line of the Dubai Metro, located on Sheikh Zayed Road.

== See also ==
- Dubai Internet City (Dubai Metro)
- Dubai Media City
- Dubai Knowledge Park
- Dubai Science Park
- Dubai Holding
- SmartCity
- Internet censorship in the UAE
