= DU =

DU or variants may refer to:

== Colleges ==
=== U.S. ===
- Denison University, in Granville, Ohio
- Drake University in Des Moines, Iowa
- Drexel University, in Philadelphia, Pennsylvania
- Duke University, in Durham, North Carolina
- Duquesne University in Pittsburgh, Pennsylvania
- University of Denver in Colorado

=== Asia ===
- Damascus University
- Daegu University, in South Korea
- Dankook University, in South Korea
- Dagon University, in Myanmar
- Delhi University, in Delhi, India
- University of Dhaka, in Bangladesh
- Dongguk University, in South Korea
- Donghua University, in Shanghai, China
- Doshisha University, in Kyoto, Japan

=== Europe ===
- University of Dublin, in Ireland
- Durham University in Durham, England

=== Oceania ===
- Deakin University, in Australia

== Organizations ==
- du (company), a United Arab Emirates telecommunication company
- Delta Upsilon, a college fraternity
- Democratic Underground, an online community for Democrats in U.S.
- Disney University, a job training location at Walt Disney World, Florida
- Double Union, a hackerspace in San Francisco, California
- Ducks Unlimited, for the conservation of wetlands habitats
- The Independents (Liechtenstein) (Die Unabhängigen), a political party in Liechtenstein

== Science and technology ==
- du (Unix), a Unix program to estimate file space
- Depleted uranium, primarily composed of the isotope uranium-238
- Dial-up, a form of Internet access via telephone lines
- Dobson unit, a measurement of atmospheric ozone
- Duodenal ulcer
- Du, the native name of Sylviornis neocaledoniae

== Media ==
- "Du" (Cro song)
- "Du" (Peter Maffay song)
- Du (magazine), a Swiss magazine established in 1941
- Dota Underlords, a 2020 video game

== People ==
- Du (surname), transliteration of the Chinese family name 杜
- Miranda Du (born 1969), United States District Judge
- Du (footballer) (born 1978), Eduardo Chacon Coelho Lacerda, Brazilian footballer

== Places ==
- Du River, in Hubei, China
- Mount Du, in Nanyang, Henan, China
- Dubrovnik (city code plate prefix), Croatia
- Duisburg (city code plate prefix), Germany
- Station code for Duri railway station, Indonesia

== Other uses ==
- Du (cuneiform), a sign in cuneiform writing
- Du (personal pronoun), in Germanic languages
- Diplôme universitaire, a French degree
- Doctor of the University, an academic honorary degree
- Hemus Air (IATA airline code DU), based in Sofia, Bulgaria
