= .aeDA =

.ae Domain Administration (aeDA) is the Regulatory Body and Registry Operator for the .ae domain, which is the country-code top-level domain for the United Arab Emirates. It was established in 2007 as a department of the Telecommunications Regulatory Authority, UAE.

The .aeDA is responsible for the setting and enforcement of all policy relating to the operation of the .ae domain as well as overseeing the operation of the Registry System.

In 2006 AusRegistry International was engaged by the Telecommunications Regulatory Authority, UAE to provide consultancy services to assist in the review of the framework, governance and administration of the .ae domain. In August 2008 aeDA relaunched the .ae domain Registry using software licensed from AusRegistry International.
