= Mauritel =

Telecommunications company in Mauritania

MAURITEL
- Industry: Telecommunications
- Headquarters: Nouakchott
- Products: Telecommunications services Internet services
- Parent: Maroc Telecom
- Website: https://www.mauritel.mr/

Mauritel is a principal telecommunications company in Mauritania established in 1999 in Nouakchott. On January 1, 2021, it adopted Moov Mauritel as its commercial name, in line with the launch of Mauritania's first 4G network.
