= Dubai Holding =

Government owned company

Dubai Holding دبي القابضة
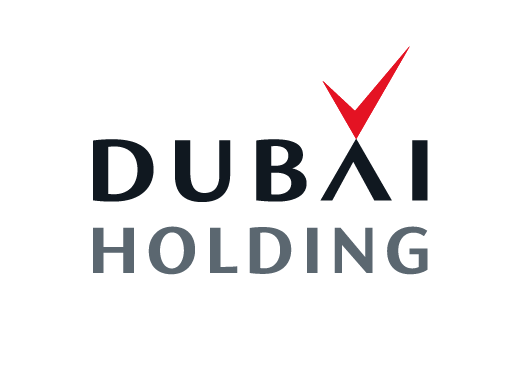
- Type: State-owned
- Industry: Hospitality; Financial services Real estate Specialised business parks Healthcare; Media
- Founded: October 2004; 21 years ago
- Headquarters: Dubai Holding Corporate Office (Dubai)
- Key people: Sheikh Ahmed bin Saeed Al Maktoum (Chairman); Amit Kaushal (CEO)
- Revenue: ▲US$4.57 billion (2016)
- Number of employees: 15,000 (including subsidiaries)
- Parent: Dubai Inc.
- Website: dubaiholding.com/en

Dubai Holding (Arabic: دبي القابضة) is Dubai ruler Sheikh Mohammed bin Rashid al-Maktoum's global investment holding company and personal investment portfolio.

Mohamed al-Gergawi built the company's portfolio. Sheikh Ahmed bin Saeed al-Maktoum was appointed chairman by the Dubai ruler. Dubai Holding has over DH 130 billion in assets in 13 countries and around 20,000 employees worldwide.

In 2021, leaks from the Pandora Papers about a secretive offshore system used to hide income from tax authorities and creditors revealed that Dubai Holding used three shell companies.

== History ==
Dubai Holding was established in 2004.

- 2004: Madinat Jumeirah opened as a themed Arabian resort.
- 2005: Dubai Studio City was announced.
- 2005: du, a telecom provider company, was launched.
- 2005: Dubai International Academic City opened.
- 2006: Emirates International Communications (EIT) launched, and invested in communication organizations across the Middle East, Europe, Africa and South Asia, including Interoute Communications Ltd.
- 2007: SmartCity launches in Kochi and Malta.
- 2008: Jumeirah Beach Residence officially opened.
- 2013: The Dubai Design District (d3) was created, supposedly for the design community.
- 2013: in5 launched to provide early-stage companies with support.
- 2014: Mall of the World was announced to align with the Dubai Tourism Vision 2020.
- 2014: The Creative Community at d3 was announced.
- 2014: The Innovation Hub was announced; the hub focused on innovation from Dubai Media City and Dubai Internet City. It was inaugurated in May 2022.

== Subsidiaries ==
Major business groups of Dubai Holding:

- Jumeirah Group
- Dubai Properties
- TECOM Group
- Arab Media Group
- Dubai International Capital
- Dubai Group
- Emirates Integrated Telecommunications Company
- Meraas
- Wild Wadi Waterpark
- The Emirates Academy of Hospitality Management
- Dubai Parks and Resorts
