= Dubai Science Park =

Emirati business community

Coordinates: 25.0745°N 55.2396°E

- Type: Business Community
- Founded: 2015, TECOM Group
- Headquarters: Dubai, United Arab Emirates
- Website: dsp.ae

Dubai Science Park (DSP) was established in 2015 and is home to more than 350 companies from multinational corporations to SMEs employing over 3,600 people.

It is the region's first science-focused business community, created to position the United Arab Emirates as destination for research and development, prototyping, creativity and innovation in areas of human, plant, material, environmental and energy sciences.

Located in Al Barsha South, it is accessible from Umm Suqeim, Sheikh Zayed and Sheikh Mohammad Bin Zayed roads. Public bus transport is available via Route F36 from the Mall of the Emirates. It is located approximately 30 minutes from the Dubai International Airport.

The company is a subsidiary of the Government of Dubai's holding company, Dubai Holding.

== Services ==
Dubai Science Park features a LEED Silver certified laboratory complex, warehouse complex, prime land for sale and lease, villas, and offices within its twin-tower headquarters.
