= Mina Seyahi =

Area of Dubai, UAE

Aerial photo of the Mina seyahi area in Dubai, 2007

Mina Seyahi (Al Mina Al Seyahi) refers to an area in the city of Dubai, UAE. The literal meaning of the phrase "Al Mina Al Seyahi" is "Port of Travellers". The Mina Seyahi area covers a part of Jumeirah Beach and includes the Dubai International Marine Club (formed in 1986), which includes a 291-berth marina.

The area was set up in the 1980s to promote tourism as well as Water Sports. The Dubai International Marine Club (DIMC) was the first development, formed in 1986 on the instructions of His Highness Ahmed bin Saeed Al Maktoum, to form a solid organizational base for Offshore powerboat racing. In April 1986, the first Dubai Offshore Powerboat race was held and attracted 25 boats. By 1995, this number had gone up to 60 boats. Only a few years after its inception, the DIMC was officially recognised when it became the first-ever Arab organisation to be granted full membership of the Union Internationale Motornautique (UIM), the sport's world governing body.

== UAE Marine Sports Federation ==
The UAE Marine Sports Federation was created in 1997, the Dubai International Marine Club (DIMC) merged with Abu Dhabi International Marine Sports Club (ADIMSC) to form the UAE Marine Sports Federation (UAE MSF), that currently serves as the UAE Watersports National Authority and the Union Internationale Motonautique's (UIM) representative for the region of Central Asia, Middle East and all Arab countries.

The UAE Marine Sports Federation's role is to encourage, promote, administer and represent the watersports activities for members of the Federation and others throughout the Persian Gulf and the World. In addition, it also acts as the regional authority and regulating body for watersports activities in the region.

In 1998, Ras Al Khaimah Water Ski Club joined the UAE Marine Sports Federation followed by Emirates Heritages Club and the Fujairah International Marine Sports Club.

The headquarters of the UAE Marine Sports Federation is at the Dubai International Marine Club (Mina Seyahi).

== Dubai International Marine Club (DIMC) ==
Aerial photo of the Mina seyahi area in 1995

In the late 1970s Sheikh Rashid Bin Saeed Al Maktoum had a vision to have three distinctive areas in the Emirate of Dubai. His foresight witnessed the creation of the Jebel Ali Free Zone as the industrial area, Mina Seyahi was to cater to tourist pleasures – hence Mina Seyahi and the central area of Dubai was to serve as the residential locale. In 1988, the Dubai Marine Club was formed to promote watersports in Dubai. Resources were limited at the time and traditional races were organised with the help of volunteers and official partners in the government. In 1990, Mr. Saeed Hareb and Mr. Saif Al Shaffar were given the responsibility to develop traditional as well as modern watersports events. Due to the experience, expertise and family background of his relationship with the sea, Saeed Hareb was appointed managing director.

Saeed Hareb, managing director, Dubai International Marine Club and president WPPA (right)

Mina Seyahi had a natural slipway for boats and dhows to be launched and it was the vision of Sheikh Ahmed Bin Rashid Al Maktoum that brought about the transformation of the area into a modern Marina for yacht owners to moor their boats.

In 1994, the vision of Sheikh Maktoum Bin Rashid Al Maktoum, Ruler of Dubai saw the official creation of the Dubai International Marine Club (DIMC) through a formal decree. DIMC was declared the only watersports body authorised to organise watersports activities and competitions in the Emirate of Dubai. On 5 October 2003, the Rulers Court appointed Sheikh Ahmed Bin Saeed Al Maktoum as its chairman with a Higher Council to take care of the daily activities of the club. Mr. Saeed Hareb and Ever since, the club has grown from strength to strength and was the first Arab organisation to be accorded a full membership with the world governing body for motorized watersports – Union Internationale Motonautique (UIM), International Sailing Federation (ISAF), International Canoeing Federation (ICF) and the International Rowing Council (IRC).

Over the years DIMC has organized several national and international events that have won awards such as “Best Organizer". The infrastructure at DIMC meets international watersports body standards and offers a prime location and many facilities to its marina members and guests. The Marina has craning facilities, re-fuelling services, a slipway, and a wet and dry berthing area for up to 350 vessels (ranging from 25 feet to 160 feet). The berths are equipped with electricity and water. The marina also has a sports jetty for visiting vessels of up to 160 feet.

== See also ==
- Dubai
