= Etisalat =

Emirati multinational telecommunications company

Emirates Telecommunications Group Company P.J.S.C.

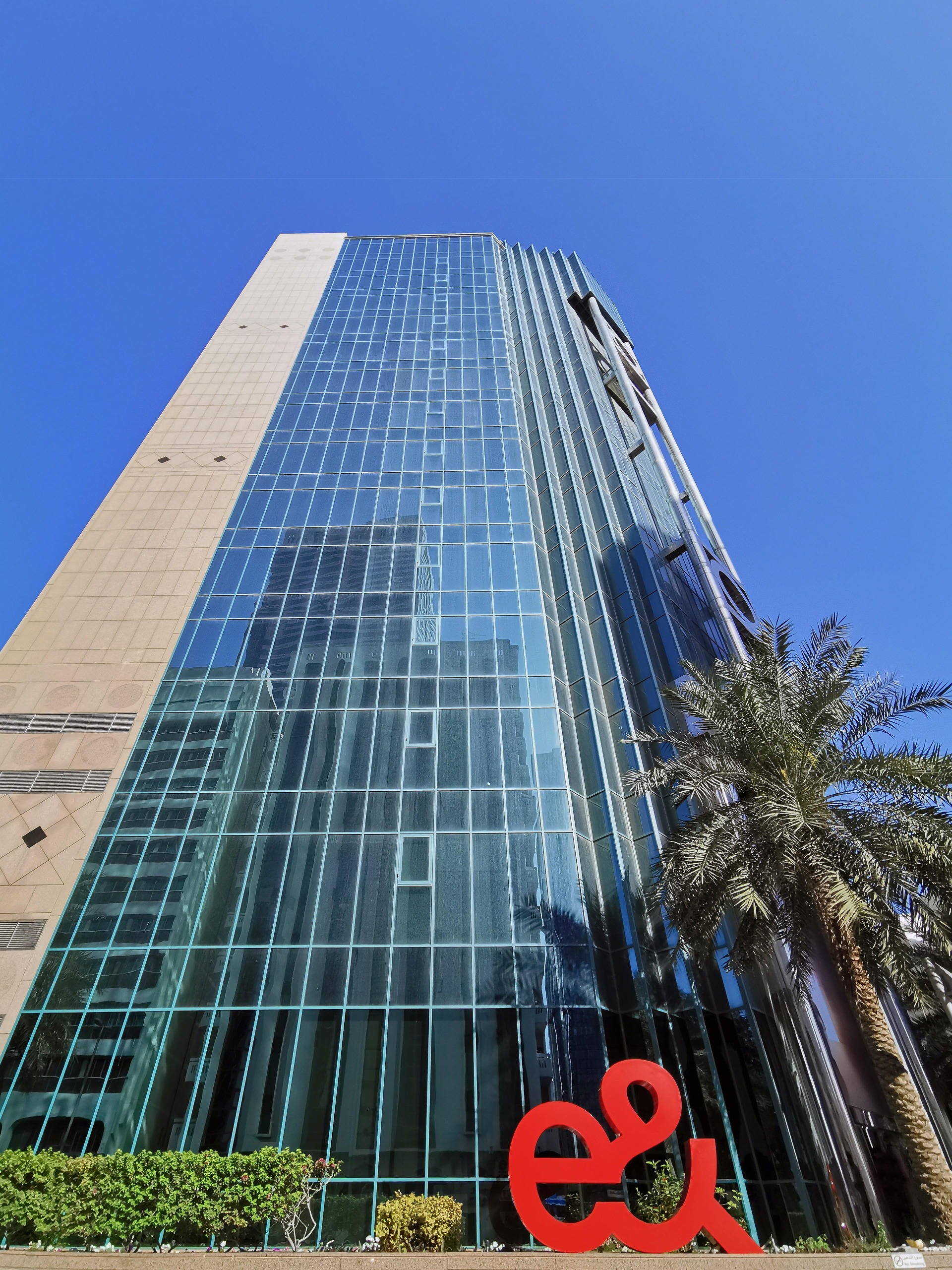
- Etisalat's Head Office in Abu Dhabi - UAE
- Type: Public; joint-stock company
- Traded as: ADX: EAND
- Industry: Telecommunication
- Founded: 30 August 1975; 51 years ago
- Headquarters: Abu Dhabi, United Arab Emirates
- Area served: List: United Arab Emirates Saudi Arabia Morocco Egypt Afghanistan Mauritania Mali Gabon Burkina Faso Benin Ivory Coast Togo Niger Central African Republic Chad Pakistan Bulgaria Hungary Serbia Slovakia
- Key people: H.E. Jassem Mohamed Alzaabi (Chairman); Masood M. Sharif Mahmood New (CEO)
- Products: Fixed line and mobile telephony, Internet services, digital television
- Revenue: ▲72.9 billion (2025)
- Net income: ▲14.4 billion (2025)
- Subsidiaries: Maroc Telecom (53%); etisalat Egypt (99%); etisalat Afghanistan (5%); Careem (50.03%); e& PPF Telecom Group (50.01%); Ufone (26%)
- Website: www.eand.com

etisalat (stylized in all lowercase), formerly e&, is an Emirati joint-stock telecommunications company. It is currently the 16th largest in the world by subscribers.

Etisalat is one of the main Internet hubs in the Middle East (AS8966), providing connectivity to other telecommunications operators in the region. It is also the largest carrier of international voice traffic in the Middle East and Africa combined and the 12th largest voice carrier in the world. As of October 2008, Etisalat has 510 roaming agreements covering a total of 186 countries and enabling BlackBerry, 3G, GPRS and voice roaming. Etisalat operates Points of Presence (PoP) in cities such as New York, London, Amsterdam, Frankfurt and Paris. And has one in Singapore. In December 2011, Etisalat announced the launch of the Etisalat 4G LTE Network. In May 2018, Etisalat announced the launch of Etisalat 5G LTE Network, becoming the very first telecom operator in the Middle East and North Africa (MENA) region to do so.

On 24 February 2022, Etisalat Group launched a new brand identity, changing its brand name from Etisalat to e& in order to reflect its transition from a traditional telecom company to a global technology and investment conglomerate.

On the 6th of October 2026, e& announced a volte face to revert to its original name, Etisalat, both within the UAE and across international markets. The cost of the ultimately reversed four-year international rebrand is undisclosed.

== History ==
Etisalat Group was founded in 1976 as a joint-stock company between International Aeradio Limited, a British company, and local partners. In 1983, the ownership structure changed – United Arab Emirates government held a 60% share in the company and the remaining 40% were publicly traded.

In 1991, the UAE central government issued Federal Law No. 1, which gave the corporation the right to provide the telecommunications wired and wireless services in the country and between UAE and other countries. It also gave the firm the right to issue licenses for owning, importing, manufacturing, using, or operating telecommunication equipment. This practically gave Etisalat both regulatory and control powers, which completed the monopoly of the telecom giant in the UAE. In order to safeguard the country's economic development, the law made provisions for the development of the telecommunication sector in the country.

The increase of exchange lines from 36,000 in 1976 to more than 737,000 in 1998 was one of the important indicators of Etisalat network's growth and development. Today Etisalat stands 140th among the Financial Times Top 500 Corporations in the world in terms of market capitalisation, and is ranked by The Middle East Magazine as the 6th largest company in the Middle East in terms of capitalization and revenues. The Corporation is the largest contributor outside the oil sector to the development programs of the UAE Federal Government. Etisalat has also won accolades from across the region for its nationalization program. In November 2013, it was also announced that Etisalat would be the official sponsor of Cyprus First Division side Anorthosis Famagusta.

== Etisalat ==
Etisalat is headquartered in Abu Dhabi and includes three regional offices – Abu Dhabi, Dubai, and the Northern Emirates. The Northern Emirates regional center is based in Sharjah and covers the telecom's operations in the emirates of Ajman, Umm Al Quwain, Fujairah, and Ras Al Khaimah.

In the UAE, Etisalat operates where mobile penetration is already among the highest in the world "200%", Etisalat became known for its efforts to roll out its Fibre-To-The-Home (FTTH) network in the UAE. By the end of 2009, Etisalat had completed the FTTH roll-out for 85% of households in Abu Dhabi, positioning the UAE's capital as the first in the world to be covered by fibre.

Some of the Internet services for home users that Etisalat offers include:

- 3G Mobile Internet access
- 4G Mobile Internet access
- Broadband Internet services (Al Shamil and eLife)
- Prepaid and post-paid dialup Internet access
- Cloud gaming services in partnership with Gamestream

Etisalat also operates iZone, a system of Wi-Fi hotspots in central locations, such as shopping malls, restaurants, and sheesha cafes. iZone can be accessed by either purchasing prepaid cards or using an existing account. Dial-up and ISDN Internet access services are billed by the hour, whereas the domestic and residential cable and DSL connections have a fixed monthly rate depending on speed. Etisalat has launched different internet packages for residential customers such as; eLife 10G and 5G, Ultra Fusion, and eLife Family. Other Internet links, aimed at business users, have traffic utilization plans and relatively high rates when exceeding the allocated bandwidth quota. This has caused bad publicity for Etisalat and is a major source of criticism.

In addition to its telecommunication service provider and carrier units, Etisalat incorporates a number of additional non-telecom business units under the umbrella of Etisalat Services Holding LLC. These units support the company's operations and even provide services to other operators and organizations in the UAE, namely: training and consultancy services (Etisalat Academy), SIM/smart card manufacturing and payment solutions (Ebtikar), data clearing house services (EDCH), peering/voice and data transit (Emirates Internet Exchange – EMIX), call center (The Contact Centre), cable TV (eVision), facilities management (EFM), as well as submarine cable laying services (eMarine).

Etisalat is a major investor in Thuraya (34.5%), a satellite geo-mobile communication systems provider. In 2006 Etisalat started a major restructuring program that resulted in the de-merger of many of its non-core business units operating under the telecom's centralized and direct management; core services were consolidated and streamlined, reflecting the company's shift from a technology-driven telecom to a customer-focused services provider. As part of the program, Etisalat launched a re-branding campaign, releasing a new corporate logo and identity in May 2006. The restructuring culminated in the incorporation of Etisalat Services Holding LLC, which as of 2008 oversees the operation of Etisalat's non-telecom business units with huge success stories.

On 27 March 2016, Saleh Al Abdooli was appointed the Group CEO, extending his responsibility to international operations. Al Abdooli resigned from the organization for personal reasons in May 2020 and Hatem Dowidar was appointed as the interim Group CEO who was later confirmed as the Group CEO on 16 December 2020. Masood M. Sharif Mahmood became Group Chief Executive Officer of etisalat on 1 April 2026.

On 1 June 2013, Etisalat introduced free local and national HD calls across the UAE. Later that week, corporate, private, public, and government sectors in the country were provided with better business IT solutions when Etisalat launched its first cloud service in the UAE.

Etisalat's telecommunications division in the UAE recently announced an achievement, setting a new world record for the fastest speed on a live 5G network, reaching 30.5 Gbps. This milestone was revealed during a demonstration at the 2024 SAMENA Leaders' Summit, where e& showcased the successful carrier aggregation of high-band and mid-band spectrums (1600 MHz in mm Wave and 300 MHz in C-band), achieving unprecedented network speeds of 30.5 Gbps.

Etisalat was ranked 13th on Forbes Middle East's Top 100 Listed Companies 2025 list.

== International presence ==
Etisalat International Investments was the business unit of Etisalat that operated telecom operations outside the UAE and managed the corporation's stakes in telecommunications carriers in Afghanistan, Egypt, Niger, Pakistan, and Saudi Arabia. The International Investments unit, and its management team, were re-structured into Etisalat Group, and Ahmad Abdulkarim Julfar was appointed as Group CEO in 2011, followed by Saleh Al Abdooli in 2016.

As of October 2026, etisalat has presence and operations in 38 countries outside the United Arab Emirates.

In 2026, etisalat signed a binding agreement with Vega, an acquisition vehicle wholly owned by the Niel family group, to divest its entire 16.21% stake in Vodafone Group. In 2024, the British government warned that e&’s association with Vodafone poses a national security risk. Robert Buckland and Oliver Dowden also urged for measures to address national security concerns. They also asked for the establishment of an independent committee to monitor the risks associated with the stake held by e& in Vodafone. Dowden said the committee should consist of Vodafone employees, while Buckland said the it should be independent of both e& and Vodafone. Buckland said the committee members should be experts in national security, telecoms and human rights, pointing at the UAE’s "history of repressive activity and espionage".

In Feb 25 UAE telecoms group Etisalat agreed to sell its 40% stake in Khazna Data Center Holdings for $2.2 billion to G42, an artificial intelligence company.In July 26, Etisalat Announces USD 5.95 Billion Sale of Vodafone Investment

Etisalat also has a 50.01% stake in PPF Telecom Group, which is active in Bulgaria, Hungary, Serbia and Slovakia as a telecommunications provider under the brand Yettel. In June 2024, Brussels announced its first anti-subsidy investigation, targeting e&’s €2.2bn deal to acquire PPF group’s telecoms assets that was approved by national competition regulators. The European commission was concerned that to complete the acquisition, e& received state funds, amounting to unfair subsidies. Another concern was if the state funds would allow E& to outperform the EU rivals and undermine the competition.

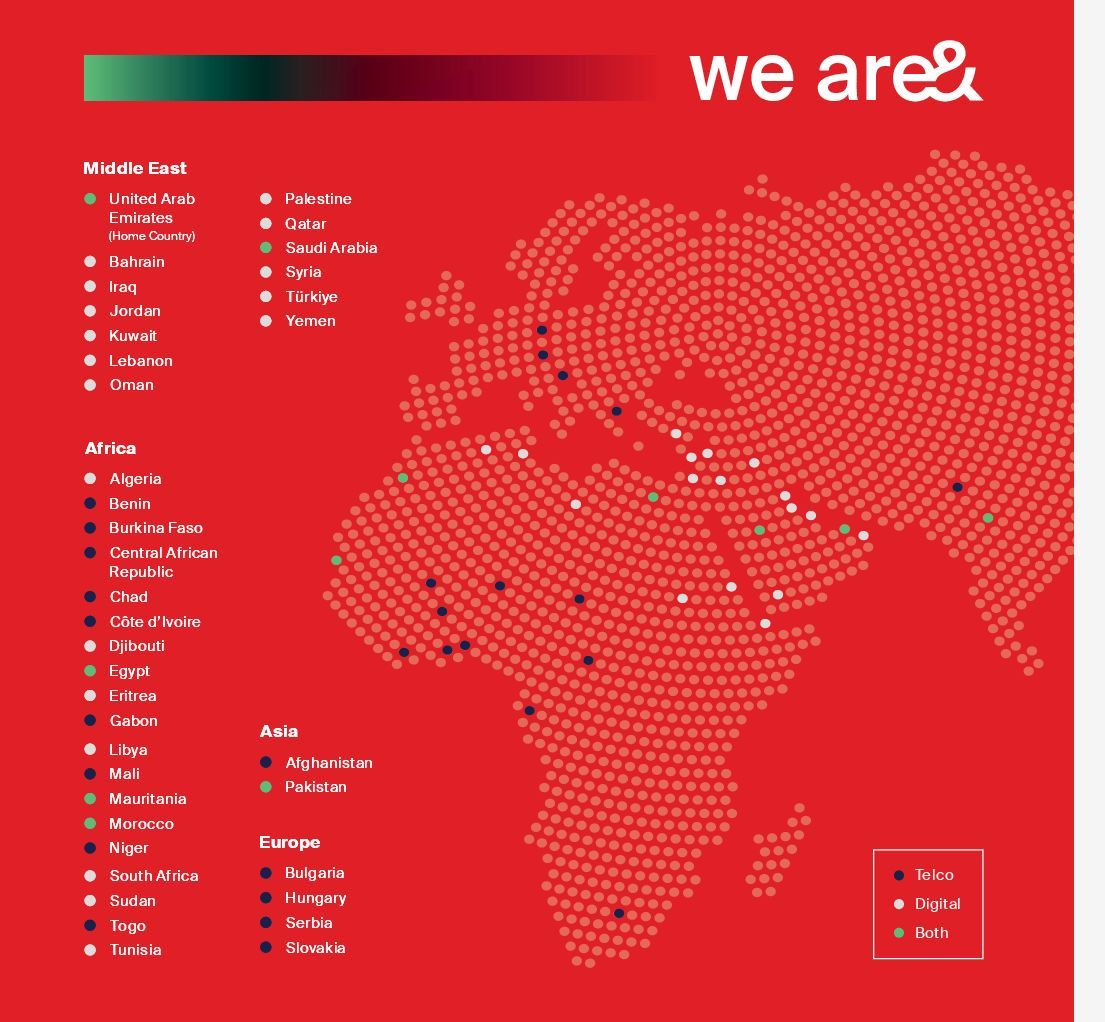
International presence

Country	Operator
Afghanistan	e& Afghanistan
Benin	Moov
Bulgaria	Cetin & Yettel
Burkina Faso	Moov
Central African Republic	Moov
Chad	Moov
Egypt	e& Egypt
Gabon	Moov
Hungary	Cetin & Yettel
Ivory Coast	Moov
Mali	Sotelma
Mauritania	Mauritel
Morocco	Maroc Telecom
Niger	Moov
Pakistan	Ufone; PTCL
Saudi Arabia	Mobily
Serbia	Cetin & Yettel
Slovakia	Cetin & O2
Togo	Moov
United Arab Emirates	e&

=== Mobily – Saudi Arabia ===
One of Etisalat's first international investments was the bid to become the second mobile services operator in Saudi Arabia. Mobily, the brand name of Etihad Etisalat founded in 2005 is currently the second largest mobile service provider in Saudi Arabia with over 20 million subscribers. In less than 6 months the company launched services in 32 cities, Mobily brings coverage to 79.2% of the population. Mobily was also the first to build in the shortest period the fastest 3G network in the Kingdom.

=== Maroc Telecom – Morocco ===
In July 2013, Vivendi announced it would sell its 53% stake in Maroc Telecom to Etisalat for around $5.7 billion. Maroc Telecom joined Etisalat Group in 2014 offering telecom and ICT products and services including fixed line, mobile, internet and television. The telecom company is the first global telecom operator in Morocco.

=== Ufone – Pakistan ===
Ufone is the country's largest and multi-service telecom carrier. Etisalat acquired Ufone in 2005 with 26% shares including management control from the Government of Pakistan as part of a large privatization initiative.

=== e& Egypt ===
In July 2006, a consortium led by Etisalat was granted the rights to develop Egypt's third mobile network, with a winning bid of £E16.7 billion (EUR €2.29 billion). The venture, e& Egypt, competes with existing service providers Vodafone and Orange. On 12 September 2006, it was announced that the network would be built by Ericsson of Sweden, and Huawei of China, at a cost of approximately 1 billion USD.

Etisalat Egypt's network covers and serves over 99% of the population in Egypt, through more than 6,000 base stations, Etisalat Egypt was the first to launch 3.75G in Egypt and the first operator to launch video call services in Egypt.

=== e& Afghanistan ===
Etisalat Afghanistan was launched in 2007 after the UAE telecom operator won the license to operate as the fourth mobile services provider in the Islamic Republic of Afghanistan.

The operator rapidly became the fastest-growing telecommunications service provider in the country. The company has invested over a million in the Afghan telecom industry, and it is wholly owned by Etisalat Group. In 2012, Etisalat won a 3G license in Afghanistan and launched the first 3G services. In 2026, Etisalat Afghanistan became rebranded as e& Afghanistan.

e& Afghanistan shares 60 to 70 mobile towers with government-owned Afghan Telecom, which seeks to grow its 5% market share.

=== Mauritel – Mauritania ===
Mauritel is the leading telecommunications company in Mauritania. Mauritel maintains a market share stabilized at around 60% of the population.

Mauritanian Telecommunications Company (Mauritel) Mauritel, which is 41.2% indirectly owned by Maroc Telecom of Morocco, has reportedly renewed its mobile license in the African country for a further ten years.

=== Sotelma – Mali ===
The former incumbent telco Sotelma (branded Malitel) was sold by the Government and ended up in the hands of Maroc Telecom. With the sale of Maroc Telecom, its ownership passed onto Etisalat.

Sotelma provides local and international fixed line telephony, internet, mobile telephone, and other telecom services. Its mobile service subsidiary is Malitel, with more than 6 million customers.

=== Moov – West Africa ===
In Africa, Etisalat acquired 50% of Atlantique Telecom's shares in April 2005. Based in the Ivory Coast, AT owns mobile operators in Benin, Burkina Faso, Togo, Niger, Central African Republic, Gabon and Ivory Coast. In 2007, Etisalat increased its shares in AT to 70% and again in May 2008, to 82%.

Etisalat Group's brand MOOV operates throughout West Africa, in Benin, Togo, Gabon, Niger, Central African Republic, Burkina Faso (as ONATEL) and Ivory Coast, Serving over 50 million people. MOOV covers on average 60% of the populated areas in each of its countries of operations.

== Subsidiary ==
- In strategic collaboration, Vodafone and Etisalat have formalized a relationship agreement that designates Etisalat as a key shareholder in Vodafone. This marks a new phase in their partnership, which originally began in May 2022 when Etisalat made its initial investment in Vodafone.
- Recently, Vodafone Group confirmed that Etisalat, a global technology conglomerate, has increased its shareholding in Vodafone to 15.01%. This marks an increase from the previous 14.006% ownership by Etisalat.

This strategic alliance aims to foster collaboration across multiple high-growth sectors, enabling both companies to leverage each other's operational strengths and geographical reach. The primary areas of focus for this partnership include:

- Enterprise Solutions: Vodafone and Etisalat will explore opportunities to jointly offer cross-border digital services to multinational enterprises and public sector organizations. These services will span fixed and mobile connectivity, private mobile networks, IoT, cybersecurity, and cloud-based solutions.
- Procurement: Both companies will share best practices in procurement and potentially engage in joint procurement activities.
- Carrier, Wholesale & Roaming: The operators will collaborate to establish themselves as preferred partners in providing access to advanced digital infrastructure.
- Technology Roadmap: Vodafone and Etisalat will collaborate on future technology developments, including the evolution of Open RAN and other emerging innovations.

== Former presence ==
=== Canar – Sudan ===
Etisalat is one of the founding partner companies of Canar Telecom, a fixed-line telecom services operator. In September 2007 Etisalat has raised its stake in Canar from 37% to 82% at an estimated cost of 584.17 million (US million).

Canar was launched on 27 November 2005. The operator is reported to use NGN and Wireless Local Loop (WLL) technologies for its voice, data, internet, and multimedia services. Canar is one of the first operators in Africa to use an NGN network core. In 2016, Etisalat made an exit from the Sudanese market by selling its 92.3% share to the Bank of Khartoum for 349.6 million.

=== Etisalat Nigeria ===
Etisalat Nigeria launched one of the first major broadband services in the country – EasyBlaze. The company is known for its innovative products and services such as the Eco Sim and the first network to offer special numbers to Nigerians as their mobile numbers via the 0809uchoose campaign. From 2012 to 2015, Etisalat Nigeria hosted the Etisalat Prize for Innovation, established to promote African Internet expansion. In April 2013, Etisalat Nigeria announced it would invest $500 million to expand its network, enabling further potential market growth of 17%. In June 2013, it launched the Etisalat Prize for Literature the first pan-African prize for debut published writers. In October 2016, Etisalat Nigeria announced 4G LTE with a frequency band 3 (1800 MHz). Speed test results indicate 28 Mbit/s download and 11 Mbit/s upload. This LTE network currently covers some parts of Lagos and Abuja.

In March 2017, Nigeria's telecoms regulator pushed for talks to halt takeover attempts by Etisalat creditors and reschedule its outstanding $1.2 billion loan. In July 2017, Etisalat withdrew from the market after its debt was not repaid or rescheduled. The local operator has renamed itself 9mobile.

9mobile, is a Nigerian private limited liability company. EMTS acquired a Unified Access Service License from the Nigerian Communications Commission in 2007. The License enables EMTS to provide Fixed Telephony (wired or wireless), Digital Mobile Services, International Gateway Services, and National/Regional Long Distance Services in addition to spectrum assignments in the 900 and 1800 MHz bands.

In July 2024, UK based LH Telecommunications acquired a 95.5% controlling stake in 9mobile. A new board was installed, with Thomas Etuh as Chairman and Obafemi Banigbe as CEO.

In August 2025, the company announced a formal rebranding from 9mobile to T2.

=== Etisalat Sri Lanka ===
Etisalat acquired the Sri Lankan Operation of Millicom International Cellular (MIC), Tigo (Sri Lanka) on 16 October 2009 for $155 million.

Tigo (Sri Lanka) under the brand name CELLTEL started operations in June 1989 on a Motorola TACS system and was the first cellular operator in Sri Lanka as well as South Asia. In January 2007, Millicom replaced the local CELLTEL brand with Tigo, their international brand. In February 2010, Tigo was rebranded as Etisalat.

Etisalat Lanka operates a GSM/EDGE supported network using 900 / 1800 MHz. The company on 5 May 2011 launched HSPA+ services over 2100 MHz, becoming the first LTE ready mobile network in the country. Dual Carrier HSPA+ services were launched on 15 August 2012 by Etisalat Sri Lanka, the first operator in South Asia to do so.

Etisalat Lanka was recently mentioned in the UNCTAD Information Economy Report of 2012 for the Android Eco System it had been able to develop in Sri Lanka. It was commended for its inclusive policy and several other innovations done in the market such as the AppZone (Sri Lanka's first independent 3rd party app store and the Book Hub, Sri Lanka's first eBook store). Many governments are now looking at this eco system and how it can be implemented in their respective countries.

In April 2018 CK Hutchison Holdings and Etisalat Group have entered into a definitive agreement to merge their mobile telecommunications businesses in Sri Lanka. Upon completion of the transaction, CKHH Group will have the majority and controlling stake in the combined entity. CK Hutchison completed the acquisition of Etisalat Lanka on 30 November 2018.

== Acquisitions ==
- Etisalat Telecommunications Group, a leading global technology company, has acquired the Turkish cloud services provider, GlassHouse, through its fully owned subsidiary, e& enterprise.
- A definitive agreement has been signed between e& enterprise and Mediterra Capital, a private equity firm specializing in investments in Turkey, to acquire 100% ownership of GlassHouse for a sum of $60 million.
- This acquisition enhances e&'s ability to leverage GlassHouse’s cloud expertise in both the UAE and Saudi Arabia markets.
- GlassHouse is known for its focus on data backup and business continuity solutions. The company has achieved strong double-digit growth in revenue, with more than 80% of its earnings generated in US dollars. Additionally, e& holds a 14.6% stake in Vodafone, a leading UK telecommunications firm.
- In 2023, Etisalat reported a consolidated net profit of 2.3 billion ($630 million), reflecting a 7% growth compared to the previous year.
- In 2026, Etisalat sold a 12.5% stake in the Careem super app to Uber for $100 million.

== Controversies ==
=== VoIP ban ===
The United Arab Emirates blocks many popular voice over IP services like Whatsapp for voice and video calling.The only licensed VoIP services is BOTIM and GO CHAT, which are both operated by Etisalat.

=== BlackBerry controversy ===
In July 2009, Etisalat pushed an update to BlackBerry devices operating on the telecom's national network, citing performance improvements. However, it was later discovered that the update contained eavesdropping software, developed by the US-based software development company SS8, which specializes in electronic surveillance. It is reported that the software enabled the company to monitor and forward communications on BlackBerry devices to their servers. Research in Motion, BlackBerry's developer, acknowledged that the patch was a form of spyware, and issued a removal patch on 20 July.

On 27 December 2009, both Etisalat and du have been mandated by the UAE telecom regulator to start filtering BlackBerry users' web access and block illegal content. Due to concerns with the security and the provisioning of legal interception for Blackberry non-voice services, on 1 August 2010, the Telecommunication Regularity Authority of the UAE instructed Etisalat that all Blackberry e-mail, internet and messenger functions must be suspended on 1 October 2010. However, an agreement between Blackberry's developer Research in Motion and UAE's telecom regulator has been reached, and the announced BlackBerry services suspension has been canceled.

=== Etisalat Iran ===
In January 2009 Etisalat in consortium with Tamin Telecom (a subsidiary of the Iranian Social Security Organization (SSO)) won the bid for running the third mobile services operator in the Islamic Republic of Iran. The license included an exclusive two-year agreement for 3G services provisioning, but in Sep 2009 the license was revoked and given to its local partner, Tamin Telecom.

Etisalat had planned to invest over $5 billion ( 18.39 billion) over a period of five years, but following the license suspension all plans for launching operations in Iran have been put on hold.

=== Etisalat India ===
In 2009, Etisalat announced that its Indian unit, erstwhile Swan Telecom (owned by Dynamix Balwas Realty and Reliance Communications), headquartered in Mumbai, is renamed to Etisalat DB Telecom India Pvt. Ltd. The business unit has been awarded Unified Services Access License in 15 telecom circles (Andhra Pradesh, Delhi, Gujarat, Haryana, Karnataka, Kerala, Maharashtra, Mumbai, Punjab, Rajasthan, Tamil Nadu (including Chennai), Uttar Pradesh (East), Uttar Pradesh (West), Madhya Pradesh and Bihar). The brand name was "Cheers Mobile".

In April 2010, Etisalat began signal testing in Chennai [IND 922], Delhi & NCR [IND 913], Maharashtra & Goa [IND 919], Mumbai [IND 916], and Gujarat [IND 914]. In May 2010, Etisalat was in talks to buy a 25% stake in Reliance Communications, but the deal was not finalised.

In 2010, following the billion 2G spectrum case, Etisalat DB, the Indian subsidiary of the company, was stopped from buying a stake in a Chennai-based company due to objections raised by the Ministry of Home Affairs (MHA). Etisalat DB was not allowed to buy back the 5.27% stake held by Chennai-based Genex Exim Ventures since the home ministry raised objections based largely on security concerns.

It raised objections about Etisalat's presence in Pakistan and its connection with Pakistan's intelligence agency ISI. Etisalat owns a 26% stake in Pakistan Telecommunications and has a subscriber base of 3 million in Afghanistan. The MHA has also expressed concerns about the telecom surveillance software Etisalat had used in a Blackberry service it had introduced in the UAE and recommended that the company should not be allowed to offer Blackberry services in India.

On 22 February 2012, Etisalat announced that it will cease operations in India post-cancellation of its licenses by the Supreme Court of India. It issued notice to its subscribers, giving them 30 days to change operators. On 5 September 2012, Etisalat announced that it would not bid for spectrum in the November 2012 2G spectrum auction. In a released statement the company said, "Etisalat Group has decided not to participate in the auction as it is not willing to re-participate after being canceled its owned licenses. Following the publication by the Department of Telecomm (DoT) – India’s Ministry of Communications and Information Technology of the information memorandum for the planned auction of spectrum in 1800 MHz and 800 MHz bands, the Emirates Telecommunications Corporation (Etisalat) wishes to confirm that it has decided not to participate in the auction".

== See also ==
- 9mobile Prize for Literature
- du
- Etisalat Award for Arabic Children's Literature
- List of mobile network operators
- Telecommunications in the United Arab Emirates
