= Dubai Studio City =

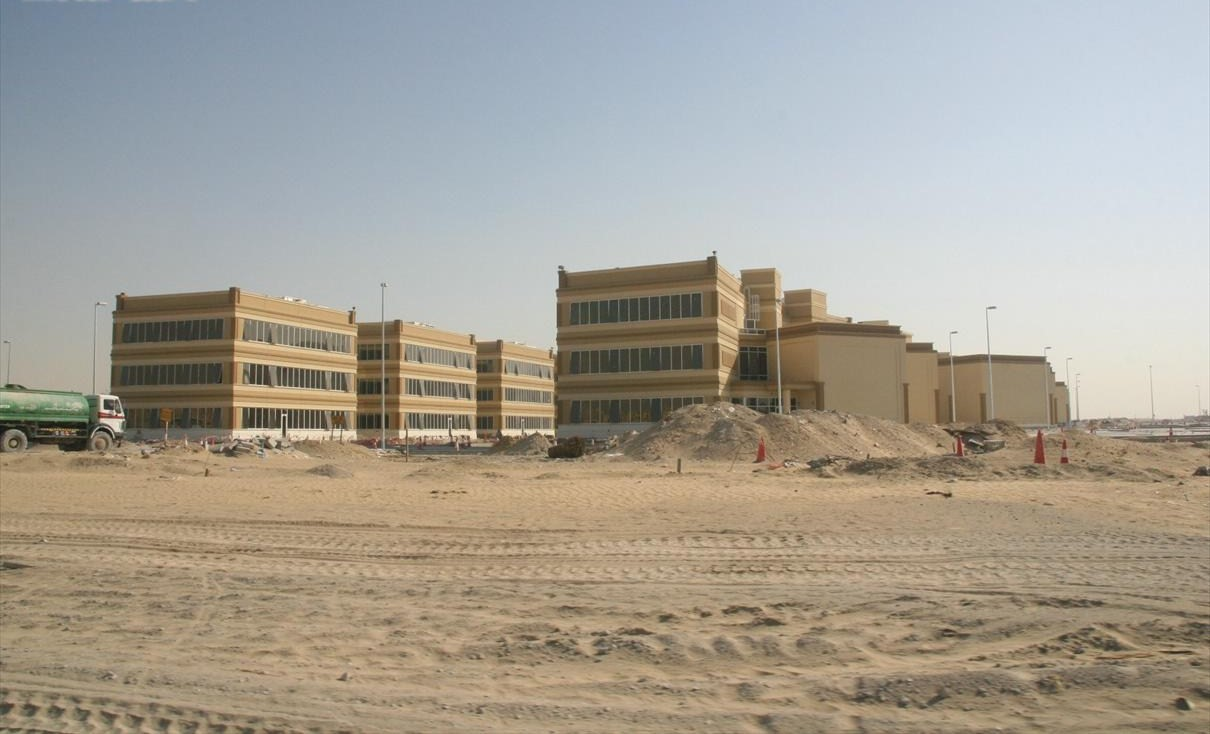
Studio City - 2007

Dubai Studio City, located in Dubai, United Arab Emirates, is owned by Dubai Holding; it was established in 2005. Within the Dubailand project and extending over an area of approximately 22 million square feet, the city includes three types of private production studios in music, cinema and television, as well as production, editing and mixing companies, companies specializing in clothing and decoration design, artist agencies, and animation companies, and support services.
