= Dubai Media City =

Tax-free zone in Dubai, UAE

Coordinates: 25°5′34″N 55°9′10″E

Dubai International Media City
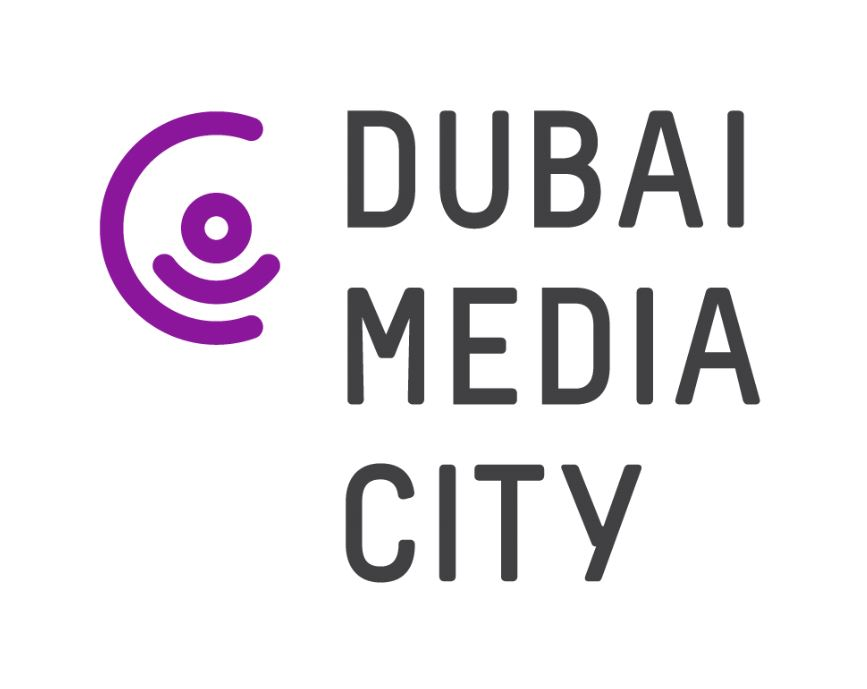

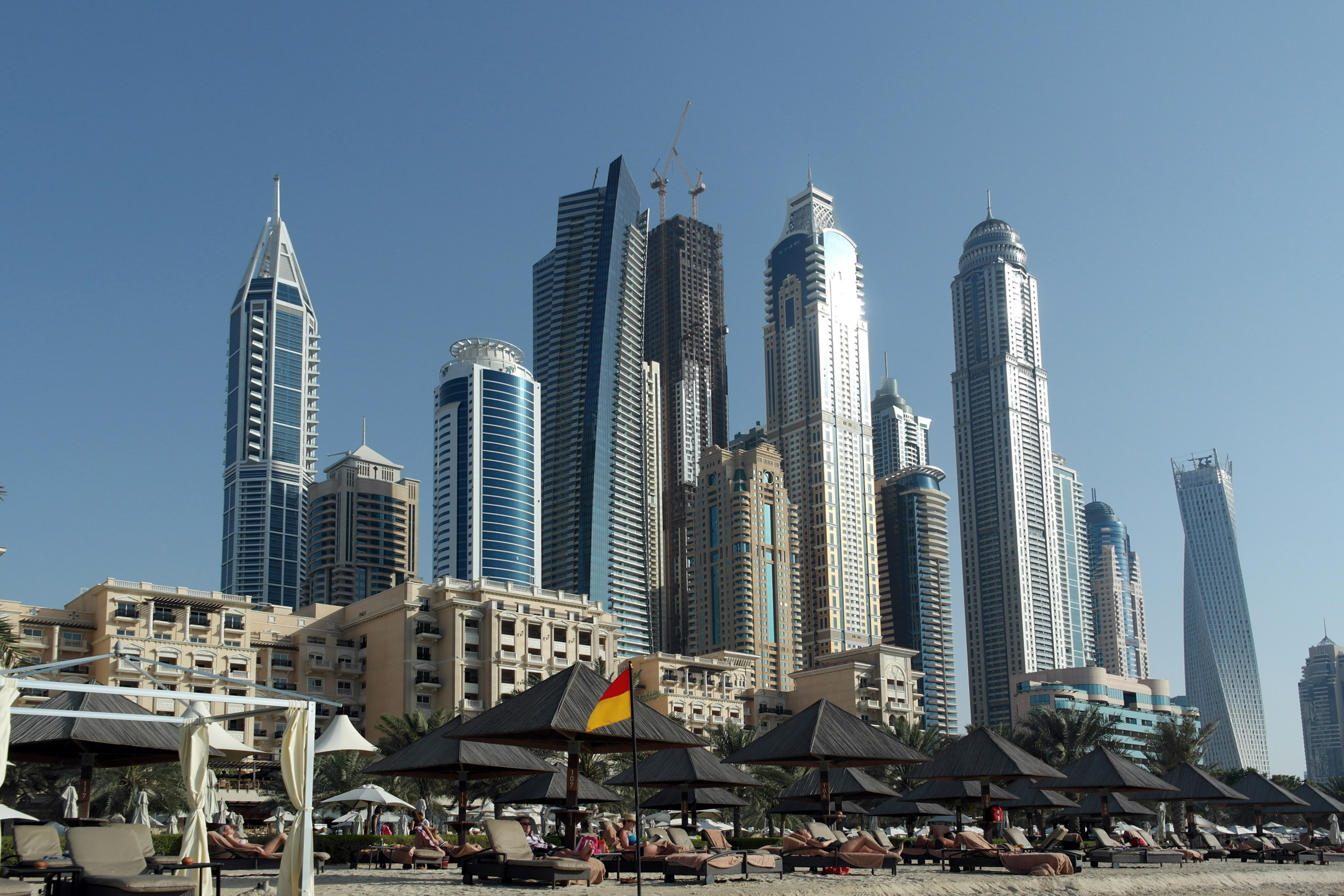
- View of the skyscrapers in the Dubai Media City area
- Type: free economic zone
- Founded: 2000; 26 years ago
- Headquarters: Dubai, United Arab Emirates
- Key people: Majed Al Suwaidi (Managing Director)
- Owner: Dubai Holding
- Website: dmc.ae

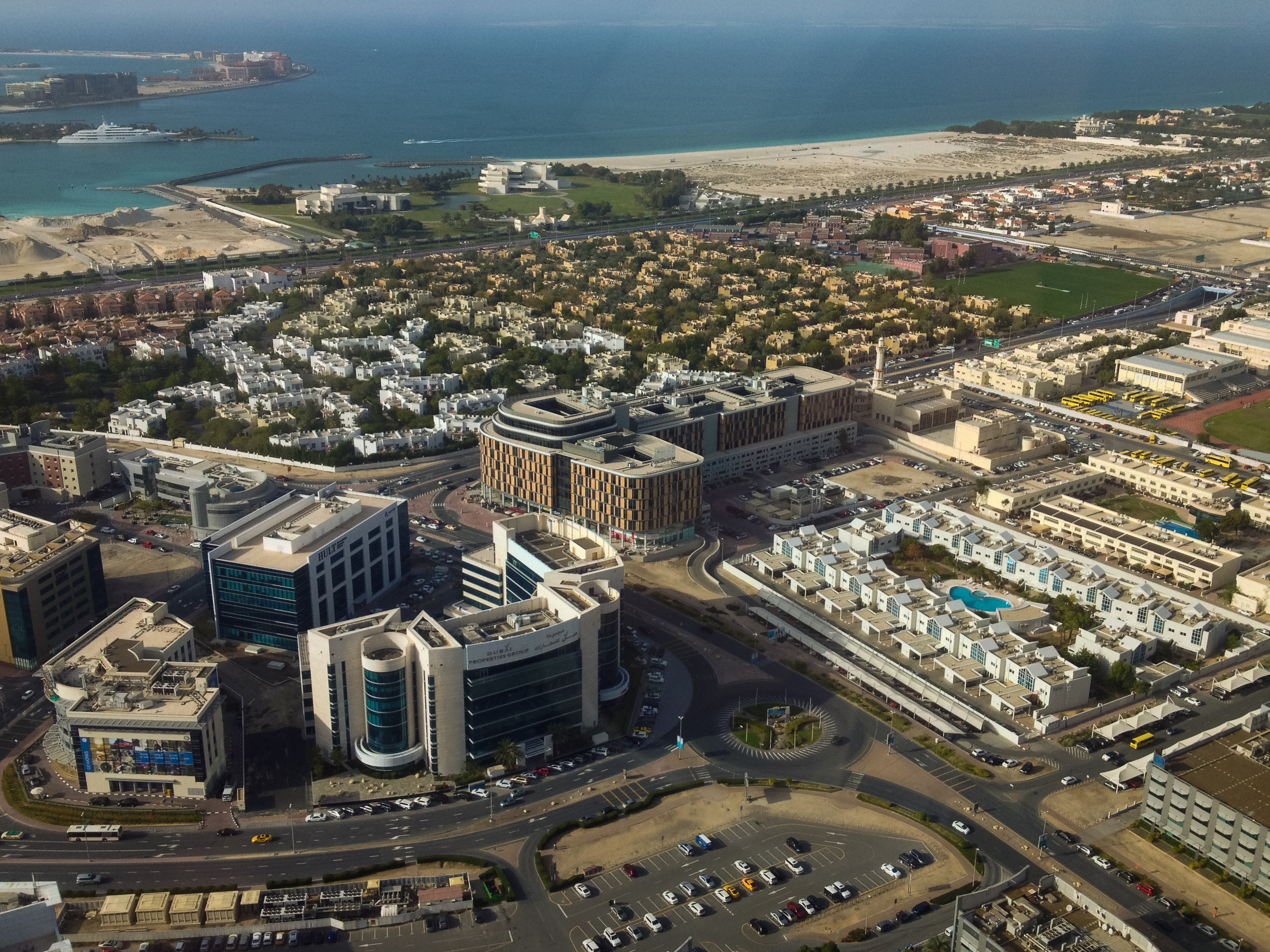
Dubai Media City

Dubai Media City (DMC), part of Dubai Holding, is a tax-free zone within Dubai, United Arab Emirates.

== History and profile ==
The Dubai Media City was established and built in 2000 and inaugurated in January 2001 by the government of Dubai to boost UAE's media foothold. Since then, it has become a regional hub for media organizations including news agencies, publishing, online media, advertising, production, and broadcast facilities. The groundwork for infrastructure (such as fiber optic cables) was already in place for firms to set up easily and its visa and operational procedures are relaxed for firms operating within DMC.

Dubai Media City has become a major hub for the media industry in the GCC and the Middle East, with more than 1,300 companies being registered under the Free Zone, from where they serve the entire region. It also houses the International Cricket Council, the governing body for the game of cricket in the world, which was previously situated in London up to 2005.

== Censorship ==
On 16 November 2007, the Dubai government ordered Tecom (implemented by Du Samacom, by disabling their SDI and ASI streams) to shut down the Pakistani independent and private channels Geo News TV and ARY One World on the demand of the military regime of Pakistan led by General and President Pervez Musharraf. Later policy makers in Dubai permitted these channels to air their entertainment programs, but news, current affairs and political analysis were forbidden to be aired. Later, however, the conditions were removed but a marked difference has been observed in the coverage of Geo TV and ARY OneWorld.

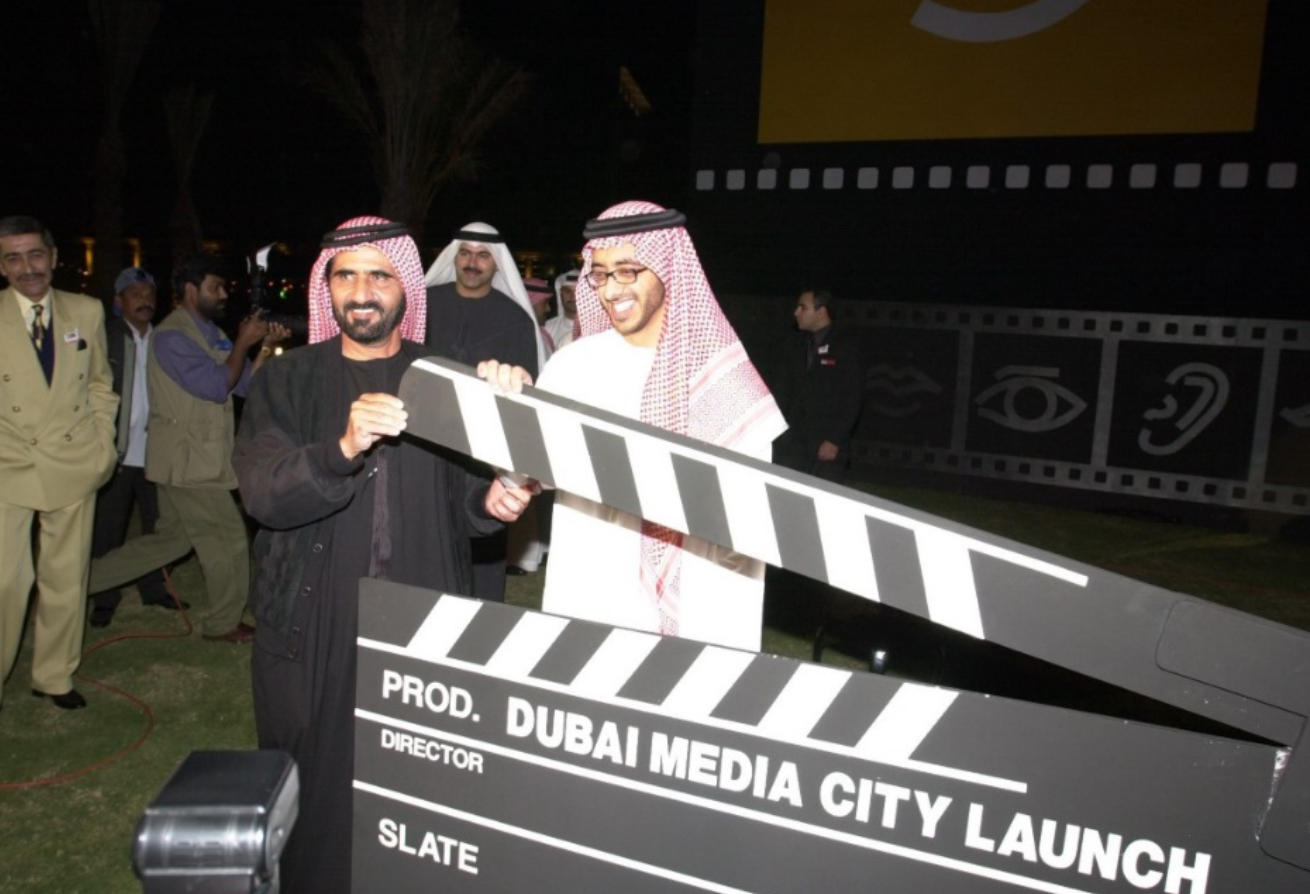
Mohammed bin Rashid at the opening of Dubai Media City

On 13 April 2008, du EITC – the second telecommunications operator in the UAE – announced that all of its traffic would be routed via the UAE's censorship proxy which blocks access to any content deemed 'inappropriate'. On January 30, 2008, an incident revealed the size of problem, when fibre optic cables between Palermo, Italy, and Alexandria, Egypt were said to have been damaged. There was a significant slowdown of communications. The UAE telecommunications company and DMC's internet service provider du EITC was one of the worst hit. Since du EITC has a monopoly in the Free Zones, customers had no alternative connectivity during the outage. On 19 December 2008 the three submarine cables between Italy and Egypt were damaged again, disrupting Internet and telephone communications between UAE and Europe, as reported by Bloomberg.

== See also ==
- List of media outlets in Dubai Media City
- Radio and television channels of Dubai
- Creative City
- Dubai Production City
- Egyptian Media Production City
