= Telecommunications and Digital Government Regulatory Authority =

Government agency of the United Arab Emirates

The Telecommunications and Digital Government Regulatory Authority (TDRA)
- Native name: هيئة تنظيم الاتصالات والحكومة الرقمية
- Formerly: The Telecommunications and Regulatory Authority (TRA)
- Company type: Government agency
- Founded: November 15, 2003; 22 years ago in Abu Dhabi, United Arab Emirates
- Headquarters: Abu Dhabi, United Arab Emirates
- Key people: Talal Humaid Belhoul (Chairman); Majed Sultan Al Mesmar (Director General)
- Website: tdra.gov.ae

The Telecommunications and Digital Government Regulatory Authority (TDRA; Arabic: هيئة تنظيم الاتصالات والحكومة الرقمية, romanized: Hay'ahtu Tanzeem al-Etisalat wa al-Hokoum'ah al-Raqmiy'ah) is the federal telecommunications regulatory agency of the United Arab Emirates since 2003.

Until April 2021, it was originally known as the Telecommunications Regulatory Authority (TRA; Arabic: هيئة تنظيم الاتصالات, romanized: Hay'ahtu Tanzeem al-Etisalat).

== Purpose ==
The UAE Telecommunications and Digital Government Regulatory Authority (TDRA) was established in 2003 to regulate the Information Communications and Telecommunications (ICT) sector in the United Arab Emirates (UAE) and to ensure sustainability, competitiveness and transparency among the service providers, customers and shareholders. The TDRA is a regulatory body that oversees the telecom sector and the licensees in the UAE in accordance with the Federal Law by Decree No. 3 of 2003 and its Executive Order, and implements the directives of the Board of Directors. The TDRA is an independent body and its duties include ensuring telecom services are available to all emirates of the country, assuring that the licensed operators fully follow established rules and regulations and developing telecom sector.

The TDRA has a headquarters in Abu Dhabi, and an office in Dubai. Through these offices, the TDRA tries to ensure adequacy in the ICT service across the UAE, guaranteeing that all the service providers are committed to their license obligations. The TDRA is responsible for representing the country in regional and international forums and conferences, particularly at the International Telecommunication Union (ITU). Developing the regulatory ICT framework, issuing the required regulations and resolving any disputes that may arise among the participants in the UAE ICT market are central tenets for the TDRA. Currently, the TDRA’s teamwork in 13 departments that include Strategy and Future, Regulatory Affairs, Legal Affairs, Internal Audit, Spectrum management Affairs, Finance, Corporate Communications, Technology Development, Administration, Human Capital, Digital Government Operations, Policy and Programs.

== Changes in UAE telecommunications ==
Since the inception of the TDRA, the United Arab Emirates telecommunications infrastructure has become more sophisticated. The first footprint was enabling competition in the market by licensing the second telecom operator “Du” besides Etisalat, the first UAE telecom operator. This step resulted in enhanced communications services and offered users more options and choices.

The TDRA has also created the string(DotEmarat) as the official Arabic top level domain for the UAE. With the approval of ICANN, the (DotEmarat) was endorsed by the UAE Ministerial Council for Services as the definitive and representative domain name of the United Arab Emirates on the World Wide Web for its native language script.

The eighteenth Plenipotentiary Conference (Guadalajara 2010) witnessed the second consecutive UAE election to membership in the ITU Council.

According to IMD World Digital Competitiveness Ranking 2021 report, the United Arab Emirates was ranked first in the Arab region and 10th globally, advancing 4 positions from 2020. The report shows that the UAE has achieved the first rank in the Arab region in all three main factors which are: the technology factor, the future readiness factor and the knowledge factor.

In January 2010, the Telecommunications and Digital Government Regulatory Authority, in keeping with one of its core missions as manifested in safeguarding consumer rights and monitoring competition within the local telecommunications market, announced telecommunications' "Competition Framework". The "Framework", the first to be developed by TDRA, provides a detailed outline benefiting telecommunications consumers by promoting and protecting competition through deterring Licensees from engaging in activities that may impede competition in the UAE telecommunications sector.

The Authority is eager to apply the latest ICT technologies within its operations; a new spectrum management system was launched by the TDRA in the UAE; the new system is the first of its kind in the Middle East and the second most up-to-date and powerful in the world in the area of spectrum management. The system includes 13 stations, which are capable to cover the UAE spectrum efficiently.

In April 2021, The Authority was renamed to Telecommunications and Digital Government Regulatory Authority (TDRA).

== See also ==
- List of telecommunications regulatory bodies
