= Du (company) =

Dubai-based domestic telecom provider

Emirates Integrated Telecommunications Company P.J.S.C.
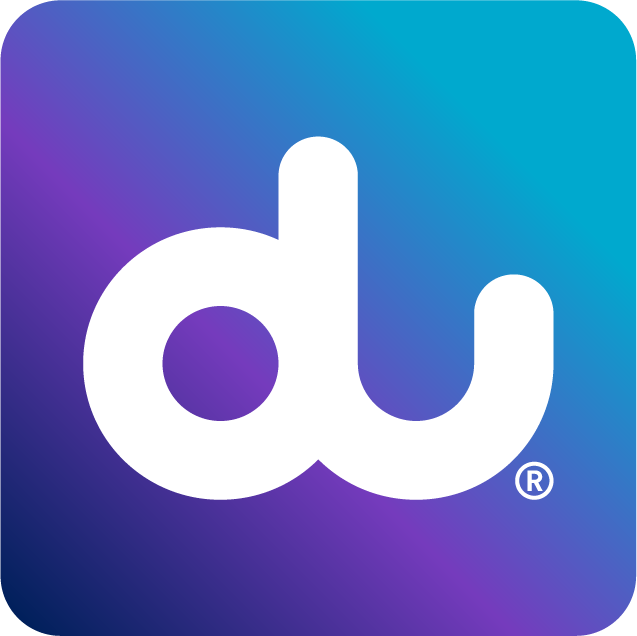
- The du logo in use since 2006
- Trade name: du
- Native name: شركة الإمارات للاتصالات المتكاملة «دو»
- Type: Public; joint-stock company
- Traded as: DFM: du
- Industry: Telecommunications
- Founded: May 2005; 21 years ago
- Headquarters: Dubai Hills Business Park, Dubai, United Arab Emirates (Head office)
- Area served: United Arab Emirates
- Key people: Malek Sultan Al Malek (Chairman); Fahad Al Hassawi (CEO)
- Products: Fixed line and mobile telephony, Internet services, digital television, ICT services
- Revenue: ▲15.9 billion (2025)
- Net income: ▲2.49 billion (2025)
- Number of employees: 2,756 (as of 2024)
- Subsidiaries: EITC Investment Holdings Limited
- Website: www.du.ae

Emirates Integrated Telecommunications Company P.J.S.C. (Arabic: شركة الإمارات للاتصالات المتكاملة), commercially rebranded as du (دو) in February 2007, is one of the two main telecom operators in the United Arab Emirates. du offers fixed line, mobile telephony, internet and digital television services across the UAE. It also provides carrier services, a data hub, internet exchange facilities and satellite service for broadcasters. It expanded its services in support of economic and social transformation of UAE and operates subsidiaries such as EITC Investment Holdings Limited, Edara (Telco Operations FZ-LLC), Smart Dubai Platform Project Company LLC and EITC Singapore PTE. LTD.

== History ==
du mobile telecommunication services was launched in February 2007 under Emirates Integrated Telecommunications Company (EITC), a public joint stock company incorporated in Dubai through Ministerial Resolution No. 479 of 2005 issued on 28 December 2005. As of the first half of 2023, du has grown their mobile customer base to 8 million subscribers, and reached 559,000 broadband customers. Its shares are listed on Dubai Financial Market and is regulated by the Securities & Commodities Authority and the Telecommunications And Digital Government Regulatory Authority (TDRA) of the UAE.

== Ownership ==
EITC's subsidiaries is 50.12% owned by Emirates Investment Authority (EIA), 10.06% by Mamoura Diversified Global Holding formerly Mubadala Development Company, 19.7% by Emirates Communications & Technology Company LLC (ECT) and 20.12% by public shareholders. It is listed on the Dubai Financial Market (DFM) and trades under the name du.

== Services & products ==
du offers mobile and fixed telephony, broadband connectivity and IPTV services to individuals, homes and businesses. It also provides carrier services for businesses and satellite up/downlink services for TV broadcasters. Its tariff plans for private subscribers include Home Plans, Postpaid Plans and Prepaid Plans while it offers corporate subscribers Closed Business User Group free calling, and preferred International Destinations.

Postpaid plans involve monthly billing cycles and often come with a fixed amount of data.

Prepaid plans, on the other hand, require users to recharge in advance and provide a predetermined data allocation. Regardless of the plan you choose, staying aware of your data consumption helps prevent overages that might result in additional charges.

du's device and application IoT management platform allows users to connect and control devices remotely, monitor conditions and generate advance real-time analytics. du offers a multi-tenant platform with integration capabilities that can be based on the cloud or be on premise, with plug-in suite for AI machine learning, enabling business automation. du hosts Blockchain Platform on 'Dubai Pulse'.

== Network ==
=== Radio Frequency Summary ===
Radio Frequency Summary
Frequency	Protocol	Band	Class	Channel Width
900 MHz	GSM/GPRS/EDGE		2G	9.4 MHz
2100 MHz	UMTS/HSPA+/DC-HSPA+	1	3G	10 MHz
1800 MHz	LTE/LTE-Advanced	3	4G	20 MHz
800 MHz	LTE/LTE-Advanced	20	4G	15 MHz

=== LTE ===
du first launched LTE in 2012 on the FDD-LTE Band 3 (1800 MHz) frequency, in August 2014 it was then announced that du had installed and successfully tested VoLTE over its network. In July 2014, du launched Cat. 6 LTE-Advanced with carrier aggregation and 4x4 MIMO combining 20 MHz of Band 3 (1800 MHz) and 15 MHz of Band 20 (800 MHz).

=== 5G ===
du began its 5G network infrastructure development in 2015 and launched in 2019 becoming the first telco operator to roll out 5G network in UAE and the first to provide Preregistered customers with 5G-enabled devices in the middle east and demonstrated video over 5G call using its Non-standalone (NSA) network, IMS Core and 5G smartphones. In 2020, du deployed the Middle East and North Africa's first millimeter Wave at Yas Island, Abu Dhabi providing the highest ultra-high mobile broadband 5G services in the region. The mm Wave frequencies improved its network capacity allowing users access to improved services in high-traffic areas. In 2021, du deployed the first 5G leased line with ultra-low latency in the UAE. In 2022, du launched the 5G Home Wireless product that provide their customer better experience with higher speed. There are different plans, and the customers can choose the one that is more convenient and support their lifestyle.

=== VoLTE ===
In 2020, EITC increased its fiber footprint, launched VoLTE services, delivered a 100G backbone upgrade, equipped two data centres with advanced Network Functions Virtualisation Infrastructure (NFVI), and deployed the Telco Cloud NFVI at two DC.

== Corporate governance ==
=== Corporate Governance ===
The corporate governance framework of EITC is in accordance with laws and regulations prescribed by the Securities and Commodities Authority of the UAE (SCA) including the Chairman of SCA's Board of Directors' Decision No. 3 of 2020 concerning approval of joint stock companies' governance guide (SCA Corporate Governance Rules). EITC complies with all the governing laws as well as the applicable regulations and policy directives issued by the SCA and the Dubai Financial Market (DFM).

=== Emiratisation ===
du supports Emiratisation policy of the government of UAE by creating jobs, offering learning opportunities, and encouraging growth and development for UAE Nationals. As of the beginning 2023, Emirati talent made up 40.3% of du's workforce, with 50% consisting of women, and 44% of the senior management.

Masar, du's Graduate Trainee Programme empowers emerging Emirati talents and supports their career growth to become full-fledged professionals. In its other programme, Career Framework & Succession Planning, du identifies potential UAE nationals who go through an extensive leadership and succession development program to prepare them for future leadership roles within the organization. For its Emiratization strategy, du has won the MOHRE Emiratization Award for two consecutive years (2018 & 2019) and won the GCC Best Nationalization Initiatives in 2019.

== Senior management ==
From 2006 to 2019, Osman Sultan served as the chief executive officer (CEO). In June 2021, Fahad Al Hassawi, EITC's former acting CEO, was entrusted by the EITC board to steer the organization's transformation agenda in the capacity of CEO.

== Criticism ==
The UAE telecom market is highly restricted, with both major players being largely government owned. There is little real competition, with the choice of provider generally determined by geographic location. du typically has a monopoly on freezones, while Etisalat has a monopoly in other specific areas.

== Censorship ==
Following the internet guidelines of the Telecommunications and Digital Government Regulatory Authority of the UAE, du is required to block internet content based on the prohibited content categories list provided by the TDRA, the list includes pornographic films, drugs, intellectual property infringement, discrimination, racism, blasphemy and other categories that do not comply with the internet guidelines of the country.

== DNS resolvers ==
- DNS server 1: 94.200.200.200
- DNS server 2: 91.74.74.74

== See also ==
- Etisalat by e&
- Telecommunications in the United Arab Emirates
