= List of free-trade zones in the United Arab Emirates =

Free-trade zones in the United Arab Emirates are areas that have a special tax, customs and import regime, and are governed by their own framework of regulations (with the exception of UAE criminal law).

== Background ==
The UAE has a number of free zones across Dubai, Abu Dhabi, Sharjah, Fujairah, Ajman, Ras al-Khaimah and Umm al-Quwain. Free zones may be broadly categorized as seaport free zones, airport free zones, and mainland free zones. Free-trade zone exemptions are:

- 100% foreign ownership of the enterprise
- 100% import and export tax exemptions
- 100% repatriation of capital and profits
- Corporate tax exemptions for up to 50 years
- No personal income taxes
- Assistance with labor recruitment, and additional support services, such as sponsorship and housing.

Each Free Zone is designed around one or more strict industry categories. An independent Free Zone Authority (FZA) governs each free zone, and is the agency responsible for issuing FTZ operating licenses and assisting companies with establishing their business in the FTZ. Each free zone has its own specific requirements regarding minimum capital requirements, office or warehouse space and permitted activities; with each possessing the relevant licenses and adequate legislation to enable their dedicated industry to flourish.

Investors can either register a new company in the form of a Free Zone Establishment (FZE) or simply establish a branch or representative office of their existing or parent company based within the UAE or abroad. An FZE is a limited liability company governed by the rules and regulations of the Free Zone in which it is established. Except for acquiring nationality in the UAE, the provisions of the Commercial Companies Law (CCL) do not apply to FZEs, provided that the Free Zones have special provisions regulating such companies.

Free zone companies can run business within the relevant zone or outside the UAE. Some free zones (including ADGM, JAFZA, DMCC, RAK FTZ) allow for inward redomiciliation of foreign companies, which means a transfer of a corporate seat of an existing company from abroad to the UAE free zone.

There are a few Free Zones in UAE that offer Dual Business License for investors. It is expected to allow them to do business in the Free Zone as well as in the mainland of UAE using the same business license. Setup and licensing costs vary widely between zones: as of July 2026, published first-year costs among the 22 zones with official tariff data ranged from AED 5,500 to AED 367,250, with a median of about AED 22,125.

== Free zones ==
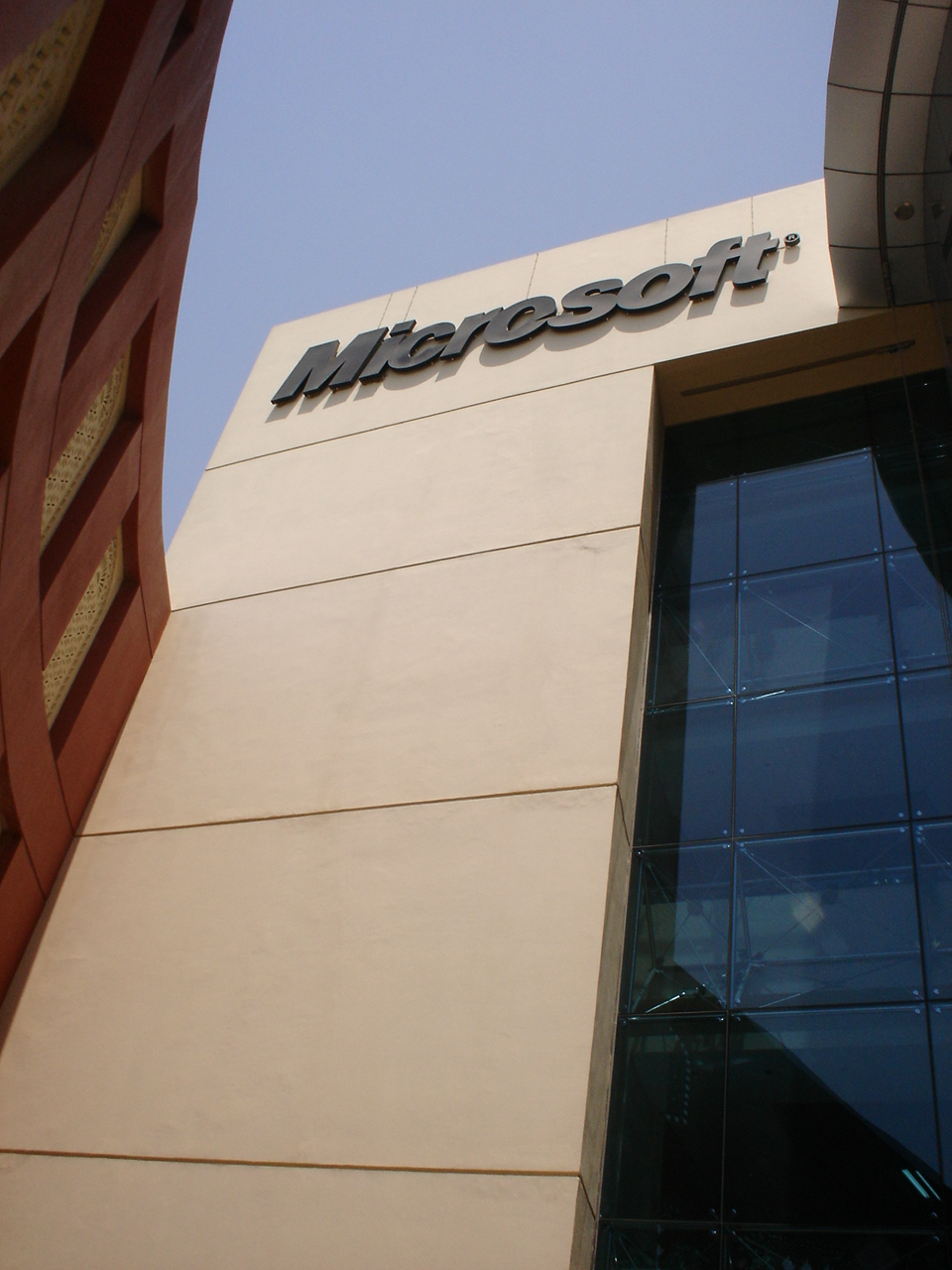
The Microsoft sign at the entrance of the Dubai Microsoft campus, Dubai Internet City

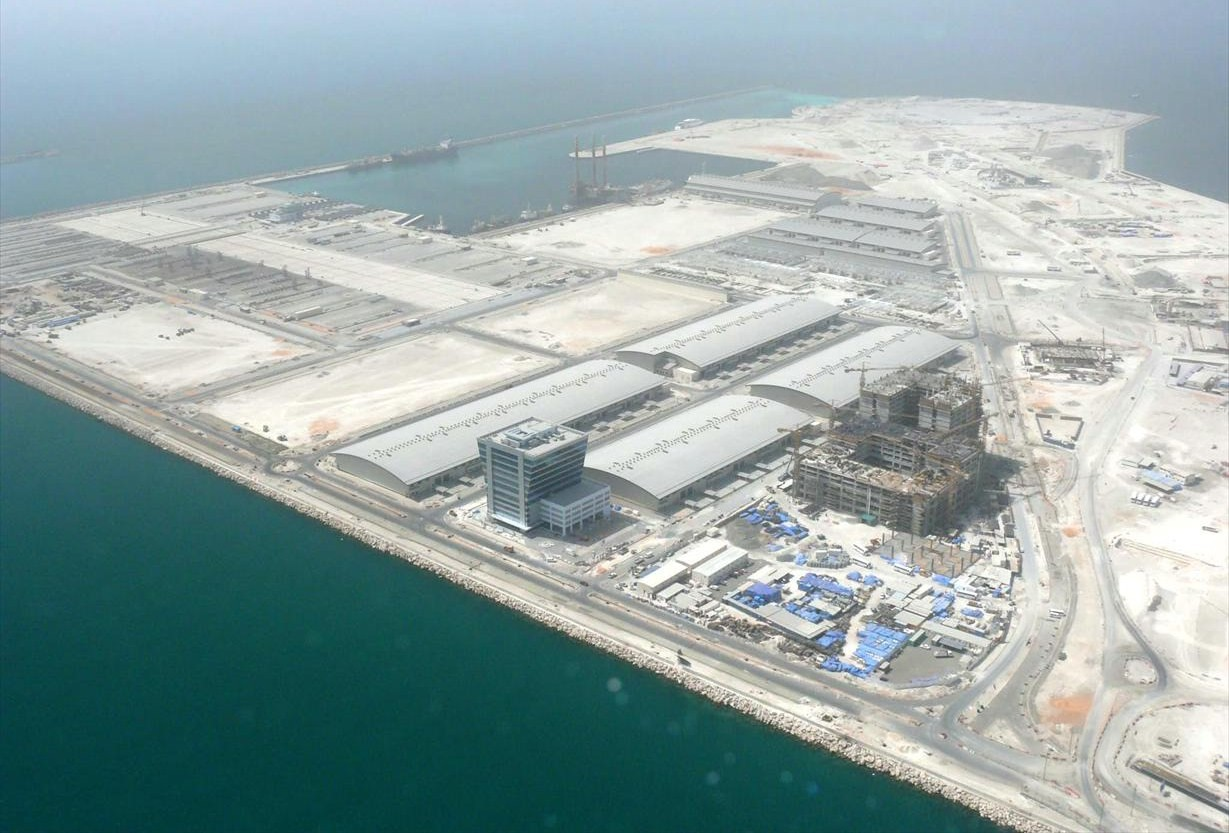
Dubai Maritime City, Dubai under construction in 2008

A free zone authority is a designated economic area governed by its own set of regulations, which differ from those applicable to businesses outside the zone. Companies operating within free zones are typically non-customer-facing businesses, such as those involved in import/export, online operations, and other business activities that do not involve direct dealings with local customers.

There are 46 Free Zones operating in UAE. The number is now 47 with the recently established Sharjah Communication Technologies Free Zone.

Abu Dhabi

- Abu Dhabi Airport Free Zone (ADAFZ)
- Abu Dhabi Global Market
- Khalifa Industrial Zone
- Industrial City of Abu Dhabi
- Higher Corporation for Specialized Economic Zones / ZonesCorp
- Masdar City Free Zone
- twofour54
- Khalifa Economic Zones Abu Dhabi Group (KEZAD)

Dubai

- Dubai Airport Free Zone
- Dubai Auto ZZone
- Dubai Biotechnology & Research Park (DuBiotech)
- Dubai Car and Automotive City Free Zone (DUCAMZ)
- Dubai CommerCity Free Zone (DCC)
- Dubai Design District
- Dubai Flower Center
- Dubai Gold and Diamond Park
- Dubai Healthcare City
- Dubai Industrial City (DIC)
- Dubai International Academic City
- Dubai International Financial Centre
- Dubai Internet City (DIC)
- Dubai Knowledge Village
- Dubai Logistics City
- Dubai Media City
- Dubai Multi Commodities Centre
- Dubai Outsource Zone
- Dubai Silicon Oasis
- Dubai Science Park
- Dubai Techno Park
- Dubai Textile Village
- Dubai Technology and Media Free Zone
- International Media Production Zone
- International Humanitarian City
- Jebel Ali Free Zone
- Jumeirah Lakes Towers Free Zone
- Dubai South or DWC
- Dubai Production City
- Meydan Free Zone
- DUQE Free zone

Sharjah

- Sharjah Research, Technology and Innovation Park (SRTIP)
- Hamriyah Free Zone
- Sharjah Airport International Free Zone
- U.S.A. Regional Trade Center (USARTC) Free Zone
- Sharjah Publishing City Free Zone
- Sharjah Media City Free Zone (Shams)
- Sharjah Publishing City Free Zone (SPC Free Zone)
- Sharjah Communication Technologies Free Zone (COMTECH)

Ajman

- Ajman Free Zone
- Ajman Media City Free Zone
- Ajman Free Zone
- Ajman Media City Free Zone
- Ajman NuVentures Centre Free Zone (ANCFZ)

Ras Al Khaimah

- Ras Al Khaimah Economic Zone (RAKEZ)
- RAK Maritime City Free Zone Authority (RMCFZA)
- Ras Al Khaimah Investment Authority
- Ras Al Khaimah Free Trade Zone
- Ras Al Khaimah Media Free Zone

Fujairah

- Fujairah Free Zone
- Fujairah Creative City

Umm Al Quwain

- Umm Al Quwain Free Trade Zone (UAQFTZ)

== Free zones under construction ==
- Dubai Maritime City
- Dubai Carpet Free Zone
- Dubai Auto Parts City
- Heavy Equipment and Trucks Zone
- Mohammad Bin Rashid Technology Park
- Dubai International Arbitration Center

== See also ==
- Free economic zone
- List of free-trade zones in Dubai
- List of company registers
- List of offshore financial centres
- List of financial districts
