= List of free-trade zones in Dubai =

Free-trade zones in Dubai, (FTZs) are special economic zones set up with the objective of offering tax concessions and customs duty benefits to expatriate investors. There are 26 Free Zones operating in Dubai. FTZs in Dubai and the UAE are governed pursuant to a special framework of rules and regulations. A Free Zone Authority offers business licenses to foreign-owned businesses. Each Free Zone is designed around one or more industry categories and only offers licenses (e.g. for a Free Zone Enterprise (FZE)), to companies within those categories. Most of the free zones in Dubai broadly offer trading, services, and industrial licenses to investors looking to set up their businesses.7,

== Background ==
Free zones in Dubai are managed and operated by the relevant authority. For instance, the Jebel Ali Free Zone Authority in Dubai is responsible for managing, operating and supervising the Jebel Ali Free Zone, one of the largest seaport free zones in Dubai. It has a subsidized rate of 32 percent on the country's Foreign Direct Investment (FDI). As for other Free Zones in Dubai, the Dubai Multi Commodities Centre (DMCC) has 7,330 active registered companies (as per 2013), offers a retention rate of 94 percent, and estimates an application of over 200 companies every year. The Dubai International Financial Centre (DIFC) is another jurisdiction demonstrating the growth of expansion. It contributes 12 percent to the GDP of Dubai and has an estimated growth rate of 27 percent (as per 2015). The authorities speculate that the region will triple in size by 2024. Others include the Dubai Airport Freezone (DAFZA; the Dubai internet City; and the Dubai Media city. In April 2021 Dubai CommerCity launched, a free zone dedicated to e-Commerce. The International Free Zone Authority (IFZA) is one of the most cost-effective and fastest-growing free trade zone in Dubai. This freezone was founded in Fujairah Emirate and has moved to Dubai Silicon Oasis (DSO), Dubai. Meydan Free Zone is one of the most thriving commercial free zones in the UAE and offers over 2500 activities under their various activity groups.

== List ==
There are more than 20 Free Zones operating in Dubai, which include the following:

- Dubai Airport Free Zone
- Dubai Design District
- Dubai Healthcare City
- Dubai International Academic City
- Dubai Internet City
- Dubai International Financial Centre
- Dubai Knowledge Park
- Dubai Maritime City
- Dubai Media City
- Dubai Multi Commodities Centre (DMCC)
- Dubai Production City
- Dubai Science Park
- Dubai Silicon Oasis
- Dubai World Central (Dubai South)
- Dubai World Trade Centre
- International Humanitarian City
- Jebel Ali Free Zone
- Meydan Free Zone

== See also ==
- List of Free Trade Zones in UAE
- List of company registers
- List of offshore financial centres
- List of financial districts
