= Designated Freezones in the United Arab Emirates =

Designated Freezones in the United Arab Emirates are special areas in the United Arab Emirates that are subject to special rules for supplies of goods within the region for VAT purposes. They are instrumental components of the country's economic landscape, contributing significantly to its development and global standing. Established to diversify the economy away from oil dependence, these zones serve as pivotal entities fostering international trade, foreign investment and economic growth.

== History ==
The establishment of designated freezones in the United Arab Emirates (UAE) traces its roots to the nation's strategic vision for economic diversification. In the late 20th century, recognizing the need to reduce reliance on oil revenue, the UAE embarked on a deliberate initiative to create economic zones that would attract foreign investment, promote international trade, and foster innovation. This led to the inception of the first freezone, Jebel Ali Free Zone (JAFZA), in 1985, marking a pivotal moment in the economic history of the UAE. The success of JAFZA catalyzed the replication of the freezone model across the Emirates, with each designated area tailored to cater to specific industries.

== Tax Environment in Designated freezones ==
One of the key attractions for businesses operating within designated freezones in the United Arab Emirates is the favourable tax environment. The UAE, known for its business-friendly policies, has implemented a tax regime in freezones that differs from the broader national taxation system. Designated freezones typically offer companies complete or substantial exemption from corporate and personal taxes for a specified period. Qualifying Free Zone Persons can benefit from the 0% corporate tax rate on income derived from the wholesale distribution of goods or materials (i.e., not to the end consumer) from a Designated Zone to domestic and foreign businesses. Additionally, businesses within these zones benefit from full repatriation of profits and capital, further enhancing the appeal of operating within the freezone framework. This tax-friendly approach is a strategic component of the UAE's efforts to attract foreign investment, stimulate economic diversification, and promote sustainable business growth. As a result, designated freezones have become incubators for both local and international enterprises seeking a tax-efficient and supportive business environment. Tax policies may vary slightly among different freezones, and potential investors are encouraged to review the specific regulations of each zone for accurate and up-to-date information.

== Current Designated freezones ==
=== Jebel Ali Free Zone (JAFZA) ===
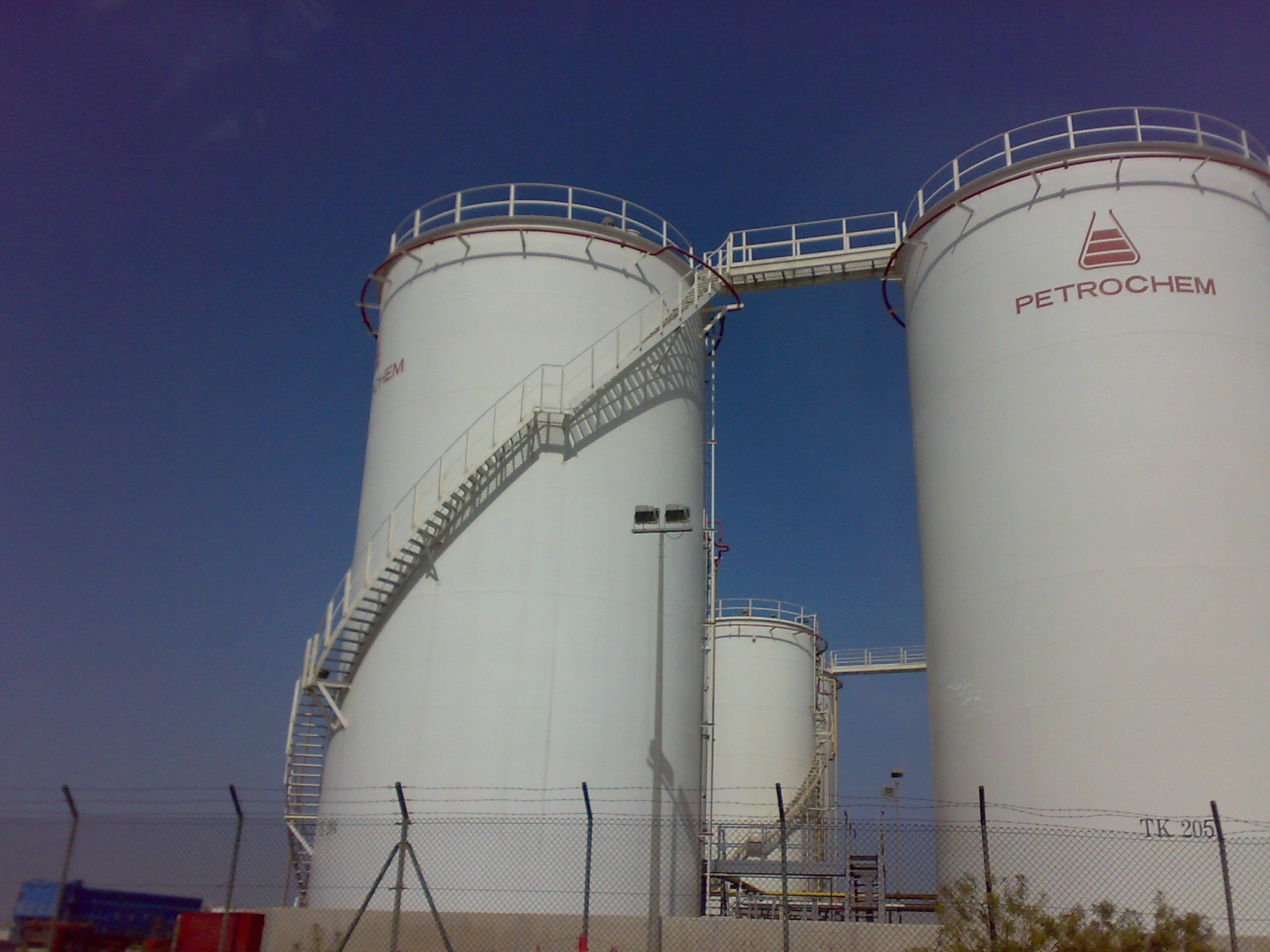
Petrochem oil tank, Jebel Ali Free Zone, Dubai (UAE)

Located in Dubai, JAFZA is one of the largest and oldest freezones in the UAE. It offers a hub for industries such as manufacturing, logistics, and trading. Jafza is spread over 57 square km in the Jebel Ali area at the far western end of Dubai, on the Skeikh Zayed Road (E11).

=== Khalifa Industrial Zone (KIZAD) ===
Established by AD Ports Group on September 19, 2022, as part of the plan to consolidate and grow its Economic Cities and Free Zones offering.

=== Ajman Free Zone (AFZA) ===
Established in 1988, it is one of several unbonded free zones in the UAE offering offshore company setup and operation to investors. As of Q1 2018, 12,362 companies operated out of AFZA.

=== Sharjah Airport International Free Zone (SAIF Zone) ===
Located in Sharjah, SAIF Zone is adjacent to Sharjah International Airport. It focuses on sectors like aviation, logistics, and light industries.

=== Ras Al Khaimah Economic Zone (RAKEZ) ===
It was introduced in 2017 and is one of the 37 free zones across in the United Arab Emirates that are overseen by the Ras Al Khaimah Investment Authority. Situated in the emirate of Ras Al Khaimah, RAKEZ caters to a diverse range of industries, including manufacturing, trading, and services. RAKEZ is not designated free zone.

=== Sharjah Research Technology and Innovation Park ===
Located in Sharjah, SRTIP Free Zone is one of the newest and most innovative freezones in the UAE. It offers a hub for industries such as technology, research and development, and innovation. SRTIP is spread over a large area in the Sharjah Research Technology and Innovation Park, on the University City Road (E88).

== Future ==
As the UAE continues to position itself as a global business hub, the role of designated freezones is expected to expand. The government's commitment to economic diversification and innovation ensures that these freezones will play a crucial role in shaping the country's future. Designated freezones in the United Arab Emirates have played a pivotal role in the nation's economic development. From fostering international trade to attracting foreign investment, these zones have contributed significantly to the UAE's success on the global stage.

== See also ==
- List of free-trade zones in the United Arab Emirates
- List of free-trade zones in Dubai
