= Mohammed Bin Rashid Knowledge Award =

The Mohammed bin Rashid Al Maktoum Knowledge Award is an Emirati award dedicated to honoring contributions to the production and dissemination of knowledge. It was launched in 2015 by the ruler of Dubai, Mohammed bin Rashid Al Maktoum, and is supervised by the Mohammed bin Rashid Al Maktoum Foundation. The award takes place in December of each year, starting with its first session in 2016. The award focuses on the fields of knowledge, development and innovation, communication technology, paper and electronic publishing, and the development of educational institutions. Its value reaches one million dollars, and it is granted to institutions and individuals from inside and outside the UAE.

== Nominate for the award ==
Creative and innovative individuals from all over the world are eligible to apply for the award. Government entities, companies, institutions, associations, bodies and local, regional and international organizations are also eligible to apply.

== See also ==
- Mohammed bin Rashid Al Maktoum Knowledge Foundation
- Mohammed bin Rashid Global Initiatives
- Mohammed Bin Rashid Al Maktoum Creative Sports Award
