= NAFFCO =

Firefighting products manufacturer

NAFFCO DUBAI
- Industry: Firefighting fire safety Security
- Founded: 1991
- Founder: Eng. Khalid Al Khatib
- Headquarters: Dubai, United Arab Emirates
- Key people: Eng. Khalid Al Khatib (CEO); Ahmed Al Khatib; Ali Al Khatib
- Products: Life Safety products, Fire Protection systems, Security systems, Firefighting Equipments, Fire Trucks, Ambulances, Mobile hospital, ARFF
- Number of employees: 15,000 (2019); 12,000 (2016)

National Fire Fighting Manufacturing FZCO (NAFFCO) is a Middle East-based manufacturer of firefighting products, its business is built around fire protection engineering. It has headquarters in Dubai, United Arab Emirates (UAE), in the Jebel Ali Free Zone, and it conducts all manufacturing in the UAE. NAFFCO is composed of two major business segments: security services and fire protection.

== History ==
NAFFCO was founded in 1991 by Khalid Al Khatib. It started working as a small fire fighting equipment manufacturing factory in Jebel Ali, UAE.

== Awards and recognition ==
NAFFCO received the Mohammed Bin Rashid Al Maktoum Business Award for excellence in exports in 2005 and excellence in manufacturing in 2006, 2010, and 2013. In 2017, NAFFCO received the 9th Cycle of Mohammed Bin Rashid Al Maktoum Business Award.
