= AFZ =

AFZ may refer to:

- AFZ, an EEG electrode site according to the 10-20 system
- AFZ (Association Française de Zootechnie)
- Air Fighter Zone, a zone of the Air Defence of Great Britain
- Air Force of Zimbabwe
- Ajman Free Zone, United Arab Emirates
- Aras Free Zone, Iran
- Atacama Fault Zone
- Obokuitai language
- Sabzevar Airport in Razavi Khorasan Province, Iran (IATA airport code AFZ)
- SMS language meaning "acronym free zone"
- Women's Antifascist Front of Yugoslavia and its branches
