= International Humanitarian City =

Dubai Humanitarian
- Interactive map of Dubai Humanitarian
- Location: Dubai, United Arab Emirates
- Address: Sheikh Mohammed Bin Zayed Road
- Coordinates: 24.89521°N 55.07108°E
- Status: Free zone
- Opening: 2003
- Use: United Nations agencies, NGOs, and commercial entities involved in humanitarian aid

Companies
- Owner: Mohammed bin Rashid Global Initiatives (MBRGI)

Dubai Humanitarian (DXBH) - formerly known as International Humanitarian City (IHC) is a hub for humanitarian emergency preparedness and response in Dubai, United Arab Emirates. Founded in 2003 by the ruler of Dubai, Mohammed bin Rashid Al Maktoum, IHC is a UAE free zone.

== History ==
Founded in 2003, Dubai Humanitarian is funded by the Government in Dubai. It is under the umbrella of Mohammed bin Rashid Global Initiatives.

The formation of the hub was part of broader efforts by the UAE government, to develop their humanitarian aid capacities as part of state branding efforts, and as a soft power tool. DXBHis home to the United Nations High Commissioner for Refugees's global stockpile of humanitarian aid. Dubai's geographic position, relatively close to crisis zones in Asia and Africa, makes it significant to global humanitarian logistics and supply chain. The DXBH is close to the UAE's Al Maktoum International Airport and Jebel Ali seaport. By the 2010s, at least eight UN agencies had established a presence in the DXBH.

DXBH warehouses were used during the COVID-19 pandemic as a staging area for emergency supplies. Together with Emirates and DP World, DXBH forms the Vaccine Logistics Alliance, which supports the World Health Organization's (WHO) COVAX initiative and COVID-19 vaccine distribution efforts. As of July 2021, 150 million doses had been distributed to 80 global destinations from DXBH via Emirates.

Airlifts from the DXBH, supported by the WHO, Emirates SkyCargo, and International Red Cross, were sent to Beirut after the 2020 port explosion. From July to August 2014, the UAE, supported by the Jordanian Hashemite Charity Organization and UNRWA, sent 21 airlifts from IHC to assist the Palestinian population of Gaza during the 2014 Gaza War.

== See also ==
- Dubai Industrial City
