= FZA =

FZA can refer to:

- Fuzhou Airlines, an airline from China, by ICAO code
- Żary County, a county in Lubusz Vovoideship, western Poland, by car plate number
- Free Zone Authority, the governing body of a free-trade zone in the United Arab Emirates
