= Parween Habib =

Bahraini journalist and poet

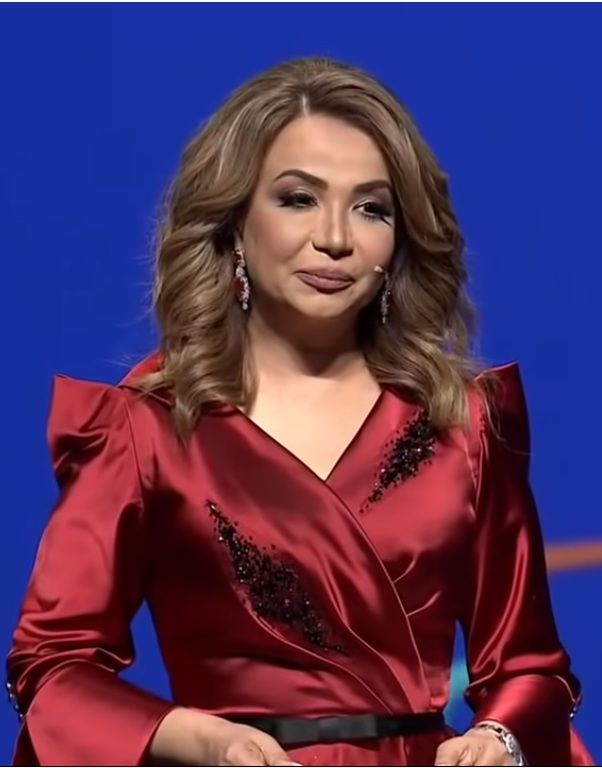
Parween Habib, presenting 2018 closing ceremony of Arab Reading Challenge.

Dr. Parween Habib (Arabic: بروين حبيب, October 19, 1969 (age 56)) is a Bahraini journalist and poet who hosts the weekly talk show Helw Elkalam on Dubai TV. She also presents the weekly talk show We Meet Parween Habib on the same channel.

== Biography ==
She was born Parvin Habib. She writes poetry and researches creativity and spirituality, and an academic researcher in the cultural and literary fields. Born in Manama, she has a Bachelor of Arts, Master of Arts, and doctorate in Arabic literature.

She has published a poetry collection and a critical study entitled تقنيات التعبير في شعر نزار قباني (“Expressive Techniques in the Poetry of Nizar Qabbani”). She made her broadcasting debut in 1988.

She serves as a media expert for various specialized training courses at Dubai Media Inc., where her launch of one of the first cultural talk shows in the Arab Gulf played a big role in enhancing the institution’s reputation.

In 2011, she won the Dynamic Women Award at the continental level from George Washington University in the USA.
