= Dubai Textile Village =

Free trade zone in Dubai, UAE

Dubai Textile Village is a free zone in Dubai. In free zones almost everything is tax-exempt. The village is under development on 460,000 m^{2} of land in the Ras al-Khor area. As the United Arab Emirates textile industry is growing rapidly, it is poised to become the largest trading sector after the oil industry there. The demand for textiles has led to the development of Dhs. 220 million. Upon completion the Dubai textile village will accommodate 295 showrooms and stores, available in sizes of 230, 460 and 920 m^{2}. The zone will function under the Jebel Ali Free Zone Authority. The development is a joint venture between the Dubai Port and Customs Authority, and TEXMAS.

== See also ==
- List of development projects in Dubai
