= Sheraton Grand Tbilisi Metechi Palace =

Coordinates: 41.6888°N 44.8232°E

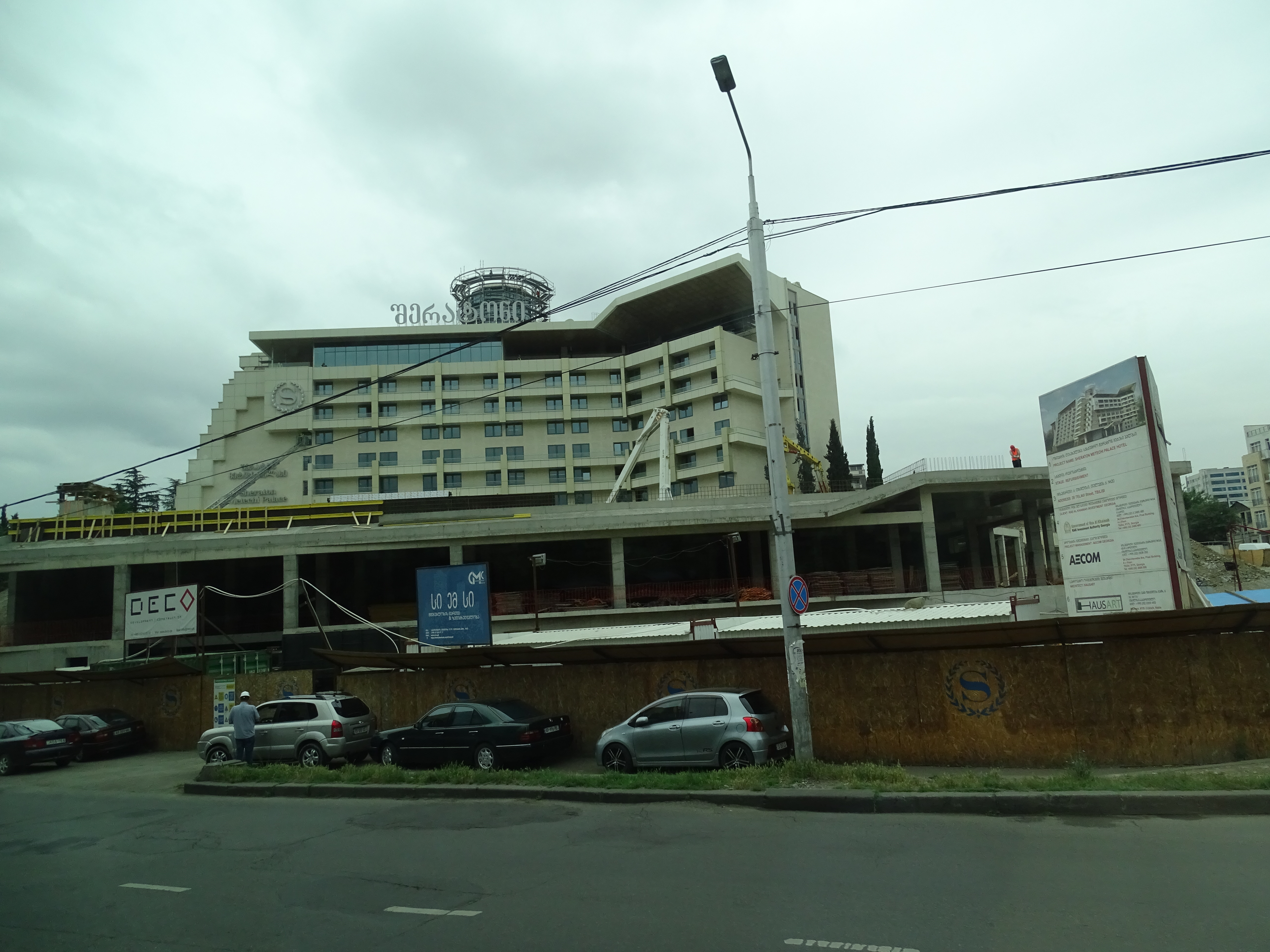
- Sheraton Grand Tbilisi Metechi Palace, 2018
- Interactive map of the Sheraton Grand Tbilisi Metechi Palace area

General information
- Type: Hotel
- Location: Tbilisi, Georgia
- Opening: 1991
- Owner: Ras Al Khaimah Investment Authority Georgia LLC

Technical details
- Floor count: 12

The Sheraton Grand Tbilisi Metechi Palace is a five-star hotel in Tbilisi, the capital of Georgia. It is in a central area overlooking Old Tbilisi and operated by Marriott International. The hotel opened in 1991.

== History ==
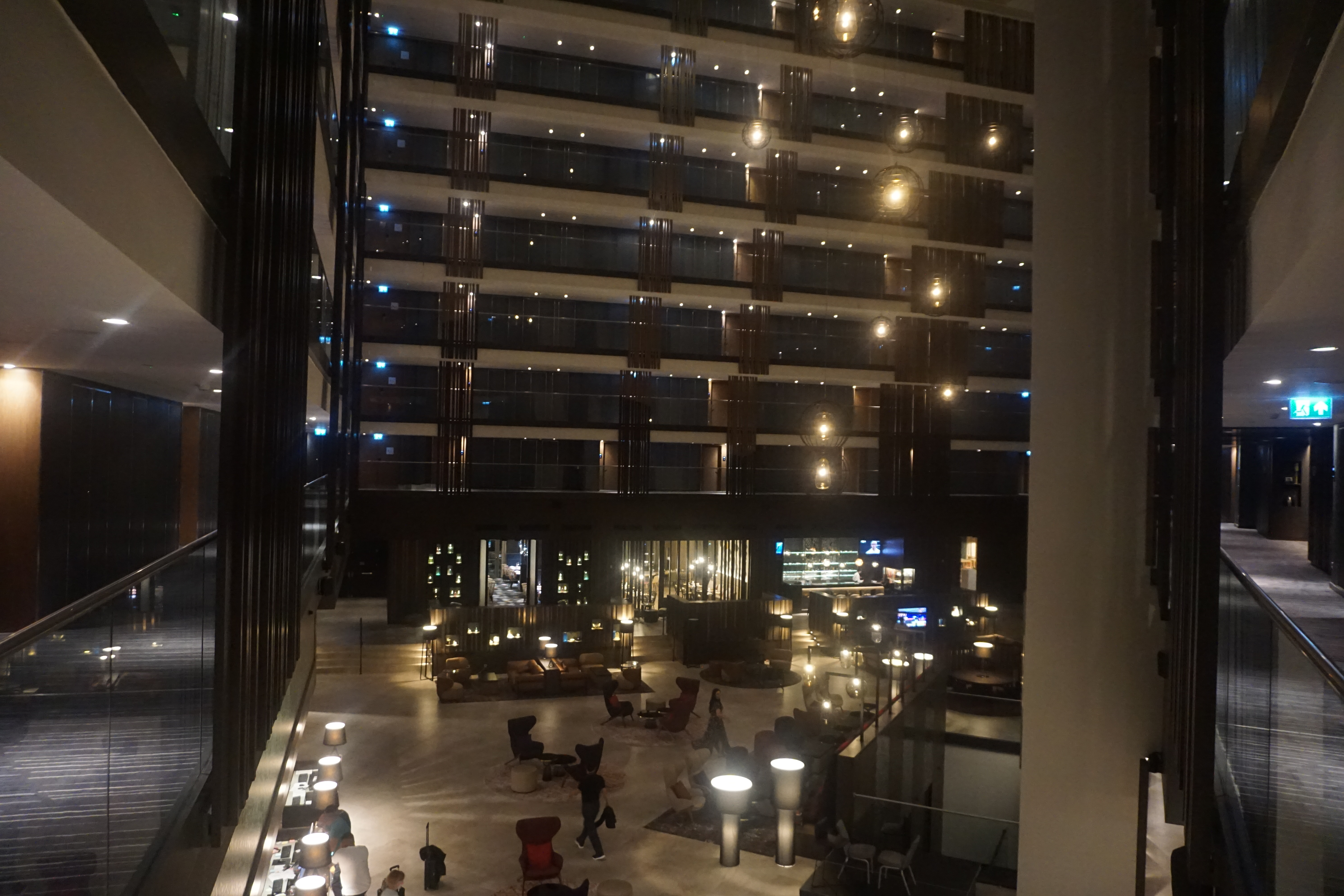
Sheraton Grand Tbilisi Metechi Palace lobby, 2019

The Metechi Palace Hotel was built during the Communist period, as a joint venture between Russian investors and Austrian-based ABV Leasing-und Hotelinvest GMBH. It opened in May 1991, barely a month after the nation of Georgia gained independence. It was managed by ABV's Marco Polo Hotels chain, which also had properties in St. Petersburg and Moscow. The hotel operated nearly empty for its first few years due to the Georgian Civil War, during which the hotel's lights were turned off every night to avoid attracting sniper fire. The three Marco Polo hotels joined Sheraton Hotels in 1997, and the property was renamed Sheraton Metechi Palace Hotel. In August 2007, the UAE-based Ras Al Khaimah Investment Authority bought the hotel through its subsidiary RAKIA Georgia LLC for US$68 million. The hotel closed on December 1, 2014, and underwent a refurbishment costing over US$40 million. It reopened on June 20, 2019, as the Sheraton Grand Tbilisi Metechi Palace. In July 2022, the hotel was partly booked as a stay-over hotel for the players of the 2022 FIBA U20 European Championship Division B.
