= Arab Reading Challenge =

The Arab Reading Challenge is a literacy initiative, launched in 2015 by the Mohammed bin Rashid Global Initiatives, a philanthropic foundation based in Dubai in the United Arab Emirates (UAE). It aims to establish a culture of reading among young Arabic speakers across the globe as well as to highlight the importance of knowledge in shaping their future as well as the future of their communities and countries. The challenge was introduced as a response to a study that stated that Arab children read only 6 minutes a year.

== Launch ==
The Challenge was launched by Mohammed bin Rashid Al Maktoum, the Ruler of Dubai, in 2015, with the aim of encouraging children in the Arab world to read 50 million books through a series of prizes and incentives for children, faculties and educational institutions. The prizes and grants offered totalled $3 million. It was intended to address falling levels of readership in the Arabic language, with media citing reports such as that of the Arab Thought Foundation Arab Report for Cultural Development, which asserts the average reading time for an Arab child is six minutes a year compared with 12,000 minutes in the West and a study conducted by the Supreme Council of Culture in Egypt which found the average reading rate of an Arab individual is a quarter of a page a year compared with 11 books in the US and seven books in the UK.

The Challenge focuses on students from Years 1 to 12 from schools across the Arab world. The competition runs annually from September to March. In order to enter the challenge, children are encouraged to read books and summarise them in a series of five coloured 'passports', with their teachers checking the summaries. Each passport has ten pages, hence children read fifty books throughout the academic year. They then pass through a number of qualification stages at school, district, national and regional levels.

The winning student was awarded a $100,000 bursary as well as a cash grant of $50,000 made to the student's family. The school with the best reading initiatives was awarded $1 million funding while $300,000 was offered to the faculty member with the greatest commitment to reading. The balance of the funds awarded by the challenge were granted to participating students and schools.

The headquarters of the challenge is the Dubai-based School of Research Science, with its principal, Najla Al Shamsi as its secretary-general.

=== Contest terms and conditions and how to participate ===
The competition, which is based on reading in Arabic, includes all participating students from the Arab world’s schools from the first grade of primary school to the twelfth grade (third secondary school). It starts from September of each year until the end of March of the following year. During this period, students read books in five stages, each of which includes reading ten books and summarizing them in challenge passports, which are five colors: blue, red, green, silver, and gold. After completing the reading and summarization, students move to the qualifying stages according to approved criteria. This is done at the school level, and (12) students are selected to represent the administration in the qualifying rounds at the educational district level. Then, 12 students are selected to represent the educational district in the qualifying rounds at the Arab country level. Finally, (10) students are selected to travel to Dubai, and the student who wins first place represents the country in the final qualifying rounds, which are held in Dubai in October of each year.

== 2016 Challenge ==
The 2016 Arab Reading Challenge ran from September 2015 until March 2016 and was won by a seven-year-old Algerian student, Mohammad Farah, with the Talaih Al Amal high school in Palestine winning the $1 million funding award. In all, 3.59 million students from 30,000 schools in 21 countries participated, more than tripling the target of one million students. 18 qualifying finalists travelled to Dubai for the finals, with the top five taking part in the final ceremony.

== 2017 Challenge ==
The 2017 Challenge was won by Afaf Raed Sherif, a 17-year-old Palestinian student, selected from the five finalists by a jury and a popular vote among attendees at the finals ceremony. The jury members were Bilal Al Badoor, Badrya Al Bishr, and the winner of the ARC distinguished teacher award in 2016, Hanan Al Hroob.

In all, over 7.4 million students from 41,000 schools in 25 countries around the world, supported by 76,500 faculty, participated in the 2016 Challenge, reading over 200 million books. Al Iman School – Girls sector, in Bahrain, won the best school award, and the $1 million prize. Houriya Al Thil from Morocco won the most distinguished supervisor award, along with a US$100,000 prize.

== 2018 Challenge ==
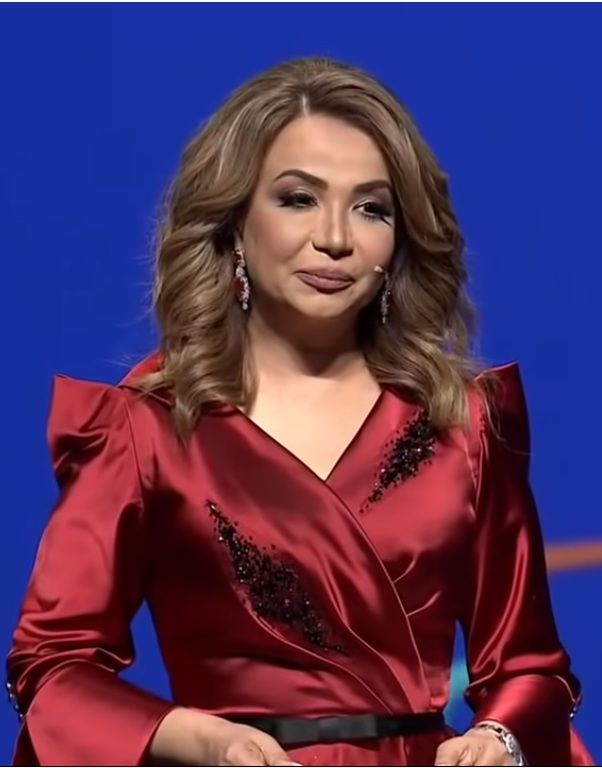
Parween Habib, presenting 2018 closing ceremony.

The youngest of the five finalists in the 2018 Arab Reading Challenge was the winner: 9 year-old Mariam Lehsen Amjoun from Morocco took home the Dhs 500,000 prize money. The Ekhlas School from Kuwait beat 52,000 participating schools to take the Dhs1 million prize for having the best reading initiatives in the region and Aisha Tuwergy from Saudi Arabia took home Dh300,000 for being the faculty member who had done most to encourage reading in her school.

The Challenge was formally opened up to a wider international audience for the first time and a new award was introduced for a student from a non-Arab country, won by Tasneem Aidi from France. The entrants from non-Arab countries compete for an award of Dhs100,000 and are only required to summarise 25 books to enter. In all, students based in 44 countries took part in the 2018 Challenge, which saw a 25% increase in participation to a total of 10.5 million students and 87,000 faculty members.
