= Real Madrid Resort Island =

Planned theme park in Marjan Island, United Arab Emirates

Real Madrid Resort Island is an upcoming sports and amusement park planned by Real Madrid on Marjan Island, a 50 hectares (120 acres) artificial island near Ras al-Khaimah in the United Arab Emirates. The project had a projected budget of $US 1 billion. In September 2013, the project was stopped by the Ras Al Khaimah Investment Authority (RAKIA) due to a lack of funding, as the sheikdom was in the process of restructuring its debts. In 2022, development of the themed resort was revived, as part of Dubai Parks and Resorts, and was set to open in 2024.

== History ==
The plan for the project was first announced in March 2012. The island was supposed to feature sports and entertainment facilities, a 65,000-seat stadium, a 20,000-seat arena, an amusement park, yacht club and marina, a 450-room hotel, a Real Madrid museum, and a residential area. The marina and yacht club were planned to be shaped like the Real Madrid crest.

The project was scheduled to be opened in January 2015. In June 2013, RAKIA announced that construction plans were indefinitely on hold and that the resort would probably not materialize, as the sheikdom was in the process of restructuring its debts. In September 2013, Real Madrid president Florentino Pérez announced that the project had "fallen through", and that they might pursue building the park in a different location. The land was never purchased, and construction never started. The developer said the club was considering building the development in Abu Dhabi.

In September 2014, Perez confirmed that the club still planned to construct the project in Abu Dhabi stating, "We're getting there. There has never been any economic cost to us. But instead of doing it in a small Emirate, we're trying to do it in a location in Abu Dhabi." In 2022, development of the themed resort was revived, as part of Dubai Parks and Resorts, and was set to open in 2024 as Real Madrid World.
