= National Industries Park =

Information technology park in Dubai, United Arab Emirates

National Industries Park (NIP)
- The current logo of National Industries Park
- Formerly: Dubai Techno Park (DTP)
- Type: Mainland Zone
- Founded: 2002
- Headquarters: 24.91617°N 55.05504°E, Dubai, United Arab Emirates
- Owner: DP World Dubai
- Website: nip.ae

The Dubai National Industries Park (NIP), formerly known as Dubai Techno Park (DTP), is an industrial park in Dubai, United Arab Emirates. It is a UAE mainland zone and was established in 2002. It is part of DP World UAE and covers 21 square kilometres.

== History ==
National Industries Park, a part of DP World UAE, was started as a specific industrial leaseable land zone in 2003. The development covers an area of 21,000,000 square metres (230,000,000 sq ft) of land, with over 300 small and medium enterprises calling it home. National Industries Park is situated within the logistics and industrial sector of Dubai. Its close proximity to the port of Jebel Ali, being part of the Logistics Corridor, easy access to Al Maktoum International Airport, and access to the national highways are claimed to be advantageous.

== See also ==
- List of development projects in Dubai
- List of Industrial areas in Dubai
- Developments in Dubai
- Dubai Industrial Park
