= Mohammed bin Rashid Al Maktoum Knowledge Foundation =

Organization

- Founded: 2007; 19 years ago
- Founder: Mohammed bin Rashid Al Maktoum
- Headquarters: Dubai, United Arab Emirates
- Key people: Sheikh Ahmed bin Mohammed Al Maktoum (Chairman); Jamal bin Huwaireb (CEO)
- Website: mbrf.ae

The Mohammed bin Rashid Al Maktoum Knowledge Foundation (MBRF) was founded on May 19, 2007, by Mohammed bin Rashid Al Maktoum, Vice President and Prime Minister of the UAE and Ruler of Dubai. Sheikh Mohammed stated that the money is meant to bridge the knowledge gap between the Arab region and the developed world, improving the standard of education and research in the region, developing leadership programs for youth, and stimulating job creation.

Jamal bin Huwaireb is the CEO of the organization.

== Activities ==
The Mohammed bin Rashid Al Maktoum Foundation was founded in 2007. It later changed its name to the Mohammed bin Rashid Al Maktoum Knowledge Foundation (MBRF). Mohammed bin Rashid Al Maktoum said he would give 10 billion USD to set up the foundation.

The foundation funds areas related to knowledge, education, entrepreneurship, innovation and employment.

In 2008, Mohammed Bin Rashid Al Maktoum Knowledge Foundation (MBRF) partnered with United Nations Development Programme (UNDP) to establish the Arab Knowledge Project (now called Knowledge Project). In 2019, the foundation and UNDP renewed their partnership on the Knowledge Project to boost sustainable development in the Arab States region and around the world.

In 2008, the foundation pledged 100,000 books to children in the Arab world, and grants to writers of children's books. In 2009, the foundation was setting up a book fair. In 2020, on the occasion of the United Nations International Day of Education, MBRF launched Digital Knowledge Hub - an online platform to facilitate self education and promote development. The platform allows users to read and download 300,000 titles and 3.5 million digital items including books, magazines, children's stories, summaries, audio books, and videos.

In 2010, the organization assisted with flood relief in Pakistan. In 2013 the foundation participated in a young engineers conference in Kuwait.

As of 2009, the foundation signed memorandums of understanding with 28 universities (including top ones like Harvard University and Columbia University) which give the fellows of the foundation access to these universities. In 2008, it launched a program which stimulated translation of literary works into Arab language. In 2015, MBRF launched Oxford - Sheikh Mohammed bin Rashid Graduate Scholarship (OMBR), in collaboration with University of Oxford, to enable Arab postgraduate students to attend the university and support researchers and enhance their capabilities in reaching the highest scientific ranks.

In 2015, MBRF started Nobel Museum to highlight the contributions made by Nobel Prize winners around the globe.

Rima Khalaf was chief executive officer of the Foundation from 2008 to 2009. As of 2012, the chairman of the foundation was Ahmed bin Mohammed bin Rashid Al Maktoum (Sheikh Mohammed's son) and the CEO was Sultan Ali Rashid Lootah.

=== Mohammed Bin Rashid Al Maktoum Knowledge Award (MBRKA) ===
In December 2014, MBRF introduced Mohammed Bin Rashid Al Maktoum Knowledge Award (MBRKA). The organization gave its inaugural "Knowledge Award" to Sir Tim Berners-Lee and Jimmy Wales, along with a US$1 million cash prize. Other award recipients include Hiroshi Ishiguro, Ahmad Alshugairi, Dr. Hiroshi Komiyama and Melinda Gates.

Ceremony	Date	Winners
1st Edition MBRKA	December 7–9, 2014	Jimmy Wales Tim Berners Lee
2nd Edition MBRKA	December 4–6, 2015	National Geographic Ahmad Alshugairi Hiroshi Ishiguro
3rd Edition MBRKA	December 5–7, 2016	Melinda Gates, Bill & Melinda Gates Foundation Abu Dhabi Future Energy Company The Arab Thought Foundation
4th Edition MBRKA	November 21–22, 2017	MiSK Foundation Hiroshi Komiyama Wendy Kopp
5th Edition MBRKA	December 5–6, 2018	The Magdi Yacoub Heart Foundation Institute of International Education (IIE) Saudi Digital Library (SDL) Amersi Foundation
6th Edition MBRKA	November 19–20, 2019	Saudi Aramco Singapore's National Institute for Education (NIE) Henrik von Scheel
7th Edition MBRKA	December 6-9, 2022 (December 8-9, virtually)	Dr. Zhang Yongzhen, Dr. Katalin Kariko, and Dr. Drew Weissman The Emirates Mars Mission "Hope Probe" Lindau Nobel Laureate Meetings
8th Edition MBRKA	November 18-19, 2024	H.E. Huma Al Majd Dr. Ahmed Eid AlMheiri Dr. Andrew Ng Dr. David M. Clark & Dr. Anke Ehlers
