= Mohammed Bin Rashid Al Maktoum Creative Sports Award =

Sports award in the United Arab Emirates

- Current: 2017 Mohammed Bin Rashid Al-Maktoum Creative Sports Award
- Logo of Mohammed Bin Rashid Al-Maktoum Creative Sports Award
- Sponsored by: Emirates; Dubai Sports Channel; Dubai Roads and Transport Authority
- Location: Dubai
- Country: United Arab Emirates
- First award: 2009
- Website: mbrawards.ae

The Mohammed Bin Rashid Al Maktoum Creative Sports Award honors individuals, teams and organizations who have made significant sporting contributions in the United Arab Emirates and globally. It is designed to celebrate and promote the best initiatives in projects or programmes in the sporting field, such as Tolerance, Knowledge Management, Empowering Communities and tackling global challenges like the COVID-19 pandemic.

== History ==
The Award, one of the Mohammed bin Rashid Global Initiatives, was launched in 2009 and in 2021 offered Dhs7.5 million (US$2 million) in prize money. The 11th edition of the Award was postponed in 2020 due to the COVID-19 pandemic.

The 2021 award has been used to highlight the role of women in sports. Prominent Middle Eastern female winners of the award have included Moroccan Paralympian Najat El Garaa; Hayat bint Abdulaziz Al Khalifa, Member of the Supreme Council for Youth and Sports, Member of the Board of Directors of the Bahrain Olympic Committee, and Chairperson of the Bahraini Women’s Sports Committee and Reema bint Bandar bin Sultan bin Abdulaziz Al Saud, Ambassador of Saudi Arabia to the United States, who won the Arab Sports Personality of the Award in the 9th Edition. Female members of the Award's Board of Trustees have included Moroccan Olympic champion Nawal El Moutawakel, Dr Mona Al Bahar and Mona Bou Samra, the editor-in-chief of Al Bayan newspaper.

The award maintains links with 204 National Olympic Committees, 178 Paralympic Committees, 33 international sports federations for summer Olympic sports and seven international sports federations for winter Olympic sports, as well as with 69 Arab national Olympic federations and committees, and 34 international federations recognized by the International Olympic Committee. The International category of the award is open to Summer Olympic International Federations.

In 2018, a number of Egyptian athletes were awarded, including footballer Mohammed Salah. International sporting bodies receiving the award have included UWW, ICC and FIFA.

== Board of trustees ==
Following are the Board of Trustees for the award.

Designation	Name	Country
Chairman	Mr. Mattar Mohammed Al-Tayer	United Arab Emirates
Deputy Chairman	Khalid Ali Bin Zayed Al-Falasi	United Arab Emirates
Members	Dr. Hassan Moustafa	Egypt
Members	Dr. Mustapha Larfaoui	Algeria
Members	Dr. Khalifa Rashid Al-Shaali	United Arab Emirates
Members	Mr. Ahmed Mosaed Al-Osaimi	Saudi Arabia
Members	Ms. Muna Darwish Busamra	United Arab Emirates
Secretary General	Ms. Moaza Saeed Al-Marri	United Arab Emirates

== Award Categories ==
There are three main categories:

Individual Sports Creativity

This award is given to Individuals such as players, coaches, referees, and administrators who have accomplished creative sports achievements on the local, Arab, continental or international level.

Group Sports Creativity

This award is given to sports groups which have achieved creative sports works on the local, Arab, continental or international level.

Corporate Sports Creativity

This award is given to sports institutes which have achieved creative sports works and best initiatives on the local, Arab, continental or international level.

== Local Awards ==
These awards are given to athletes, officials or organisations of United Arab Emirates only.

=== Best Local Athlete ===
Year	Winner	Sport
2009	Mr. Ahmed Sultan Al Ketbi	Equestrian
2010	Mr. Yahya Mansour Al-Hammadi	Jujutsu
2011	Mr. Nader Mujtahed Ali Bin Hindi	Water ski
2011	Mr. Salem Abdulrahman Mohamed Saleh	Chess
2012	Mr. Abdulla Sultan Hamad Masoud Al-Aryani	Shooting
2013	None Awarded	
2014	Mr. Faisal Fahad Ahmed Al-Koutby	Jujutsu
2015	Mr. Saif Bin Futtais	Shooting
2016	None Awarded	
2017	Omar Abdulrahman Ahmed Al-Raaki Al-Amoodi	Football

=== Best Local Referee ===
Year	Winner	Sport
2009	None Awarded	
2010	None Awarded	
2011	Mr. Omar Mohamed Zubaeer Al-Marzouqi	Handball
2011	Mr. Mohammad Rashid Al-Nuaimi	Handball
2012	Mr. Hamed Mohammed Ahmed Al-Rousy	Volleyball
2013	Mr. Sultan Ali Mohammed Al-Taher	Chess
2014	Mr. Mahdi Abdulrahim Abu El-Hassan	Chess
2014	Mr. Yaqoub Ghabish	Basketball
2015	Mr. Mohammed Essa Al Adhab	Equestrian
2016	Mr. Khamis Hassan Al-Shamsi	Futsal
2017	Mr. Ebrahim Yousef Khalaf Al-Mansoori	Football

=== Best Local Coach ===
Year	Winner	Sport
2009	Mahdi Ali	Football
2010	None Awarded	
2011	Abdullah Sweidan Said Bin Sweidan	Cycling
2012	None Awarded	
2013	None Awarded	
2014	None Awarded	
2015	None Awarded	
2016	Mr. Ismail Mohammad Abdulrahman Al-Jeziri	Equestrian
2017	Mr. Saeed Bin Suroor Al Khaldi	

=== Best Local Team ===
Year	Winner	Sport
2009	UAE Youth National Football Team	Football
2010	UAE National Bowling Team	Bowling
2011	UAE National Football Team	Football
2012	Al-Nasr Sports Cultural Club (Men's Table Tennis Team)	Table tennis
2013	Victory Team 3	Powerboating
2014	UAE National Handball Team	Handball
2015	UAE National Disabled Shooting Team	Shooting
2016	None Awarded	
2017	None Awarded	

=== Best Local Administrator ===
Year	Winner	Sport
2009	Mohammed Ahmed Bin Sulayem	Auto race
2010	Ali Hamad Madhad Saif Al-Badwawi	Football
2011	None Awarded	
2012	None Awarded	
2013	None Awarded	
2014	Mr. Ahmad Al Kamali	Athletics
2015	Mr. Majid Abdulla Mushed Rashed	Paralympics
2016	Mr. Naser Mohamed Al-Tamimi	Judo
2017	None Awarded	

=== Best Local Organisation ===
Year	Winner	Sport
2009	Sharjah Ladies Club	
2009	United Arab Emirates Athletics Federation	Athletics
2010	Al Ain Sports and Cultural Club	Different sports
2011	UAE Taekwondo and Karate Federation	Taekwondo & Karate
2011	Al-Theqa Disabled Club	
2012	United Arab Emirates Wrestling, Judo, Jiu-Jitsu and Kickboxing Federation	Wrestling, Judo, Jiu-Jitsu, Kickboxing
2013	Mamemo Productions	Beach water polo
2014	None Awarded	
2015	SkyDive Dubai	Different sports
2015	Abu Dhabi Falcons Club	
2016	UAE Paralympic Committee	Paralympics
2017	UAE Jiu-Jitsu Federation	Jujutsu

== Arab Awards ==
These awards are given to the athletes of Arab countries.

=== Best Arab Player ===
Year	Winner	Country	Sport
2009	Mr. Oussama Mellouli	Tunisia	Swimming
2010	Mr. Ali Mohammed Al-Asi	Jordan	Gymnastics
2011	Mr. Ibrahim Sabry	Egypt	Archery
2012	Mr. Taoufik Makhloufi	Algeria	Athletics
2013	Mr. Mutaz Essa Barshim	Qatar	Athletics
2014	Mr. Ayanleh Souleiman	Djibouti	Athletics
2015	Mr. Ihab Abdelrahman	Egypt	Athletics
2016	Mr. Ahmad Abughaush	Jordan	Taekwondo
2017	Ms. Nour Atef Ahmed Zaki El Sherbini	Egypt	Squash

=== Best Arab Coach ===
Year	Winner	Country	Sport
2009	Mr. Hassan Shehata	Egypt	Football
2010	Mr. Jama Mohamed Aden	Somalia	Athletics
Not awarded from 2011 to 2014
2015	Mr. Kheïreddine Madoui	Algeria	Football
2016	Mr. Ali Al Zahrani	Saudi Arabia	Karate
2017	Mr. Faris Ali Ibrahim Al Assaf	Jordan	Taekwondo

=== Best Arab Team ===
Year	Winner	Country	Sport
2009	Oman National Football Team	Oman	Football
2010	None Awarded		
2011	Egypt National Youth Handball Team	Egypt	Handball
2012	None Awarded		
2013	Al Ahly SC (Football Team)	Egypt	Football
2014	Saudi Arabia Disabled Football Team	Saudi Arabia	Football
2015	None Awarded		
2016	Bahrain Royal Endurance Team	Bahrain	Equestrian
2017	Iraq National U-16 Football Team	Iraq	Football

=== Best Arab Organisation ===
Year	Winner	Country	Sport
2009	Tunisia National Center for Medicine and Sports Science	Tunisia	
2010	Sudan Athletics Association	Sudan	Athletics
2011	Bahrain Olympic Committee	Bahrain	
2012	Qatar Olympic Committee	Qatar	
2013	Sports Institute Pierre de Coubertin	Tunisia	
2014	Fitness Time Corporation	Saudi Arabia	
2015	Sports Department of Egyptian Armed Forces	Egypt	
2016	Sheikha Althani for Underprivileged Children	Egypt	
2017	None Awarded		

== Best International Organisation ==
Year	Winner	Country	Sport
	Not awarded between 2009 – 2011		
2012	British Olympic Association	United Kingdom	
2013	Fédération Internationale de Football Association	Switzerland	Football
2014	International Hockey Federation	Switzerland	Hockey
2015	International Judo Federation	Switzerland	Judo
2016	Badminton World Federation	Malaysia	Badminton
2016	British Paralympic Association	United Kingdom	
2017	Union Cycliste Internationale	Switzerland	Cycling
2017	International Cricket Council	United Arab Emirates	Cricket

== Other Awards ==
=== 2009 ===
Award	Winner	Country
Sports Figure Contributed to the Enrichment of the Local Sports Movement Award	Sheikh Hazza bin Zayed bin Sultan Al Nahyan	United Arab Emirates
Sports Figure Contributed to the Enrichment of the Arab Sports Movement Award	Sheikh Ahmed Al-Fahad Al-Ahmed Al-Sabah	Kuwait
Athlete Achieved Success within Major Humanitarian Challenges	Mr. Mohammed Khamis Khalaf	United Arab Emirates
Athlete Achieved Outstanding Successes	Mr. Abubaker Kaki Khamis	Sudan
An achievement based on sports values	Al-Wehdat SC	Jordan
An outstanding media initiative promoting sports	Al Jamaheer Program team of Dubai Sports Channel	United Arab Emirates

=== 2010 ===
Award	Winner	Country
Sports figure contributed to the Enrichment of local sports movement	Sheikh Sultan bin Muhammad Al-Qasimi	United Arab Emirates
Sports figure contributed to the Enrichment of Arab sports movement	Sheikh Mohammed bin Hamad bin Khalifa Al Thani	Qatar
Sports figure contributed to the Enrichment of the Women Sports	Sheikha Naima Al-Jaber Al-Ahmad Al-Sabah	Kuwait
An organisation supports and promotes sports in the community	Egyptian Olympic Committee	Egypt
Successful program resulted in outstanding outcomes	Qatar Olympic Committee	Qatar
Successful program resulted in outstanding outcomes	Abu Dhabi Sports Council	United Arab Emirates
Local junior athlete achieved tremendous success in the field of sports	Mr. Ahmed Khalil	United Arab Emirates
