= Aggressive legalism =

Leveraging the rules in trade agreement

In the context of globalization and the subsequent proliferation of free trade agreements (FTAs), legal scholars generally refer to the political strategy used by a sovereign state to leverage a trade agreement's substantive rules to counter behavior it deems unreasonable by its trading partners, as aggressive legalism.

== Development ==
Following World War II and the Bretton Woods Conference, the United States and the Allied Powers designed a new world economic order, partially emphasizing greater cooperative trade relationships. With the adoption of the General Agreement on Tariffs and Trade (GATT) in 1946 and via its replacement by the World Trade Organization (WTO) in 1995, these countries developed a comprehensive legal framework, that reflected their common legal traditions, to facilitate these relationships, including a system to settle disputes that favored litigation.

Somewhat under GATT in the 1950s but specifically with the adoption of the WTO, these countries engaged increased trade with Asian countries, as they became signatories. Initially, while the U.S. and the Allied Powers leveraged the agreement's respective legal frameworks and dispute-mechanisms including litigation to deal with disputes with their trading partners, many Asian countries choose not to. Instead, they avoided legal confrontation, in favor of bilateral negotiations to arrive at a settlement. Social-cultural disparities between each, concerning an inclination to litigate, are likely indicative of why.

However, in the 1980s and 1990s, under both GATT and WTO, many Asian countries began to utilize their legal frameworks to settle disputes.

In 2001, in Aggressive Legalism: The Rules of the WTO and Japan's Emerging Trade Strategy, Saadia M. Pekkanen described the increasing tendency of the Japanese government's use of the World Trade Organization's (WTO) dispute settlement protocols to counter adverse acts by its trading partners as aggressive legalism. Aggressive legalism, she argued is "a conscious strategy where a substantive set of international legal rules can be made to serve as both 'shield' and 'sword' in trade disputes among sovereign states."

== Modern aggressive legalism ==
In a policy primer for the United States Government, The Policymaker's Library wrote that the United States' influence with its Asian trading partners has waned and that an "emphasis on aggressive legalism" affords opportunities to reshape economic relationships going forward.

=== United States ===
The Korea–US Free Trade Agreement (KORUS), reflects a political strategy by both the United States and South Korea of aggressive legalism. That is, both countries agreed to envelope in the agreement binding legal rules to deal with lingering bilateral trade disputes.

=== Asia ===
Following the succession of GATT with the WTO in the 1980s and 1990s, many Asian countries, including China, Japan, and South Korea, shifted to a policy of aggressive legalism, evidenced by each's willingness to use the legal frameworks provided under both to directly engage bilateral trading disputes with their partners.
