= Free-trade zone =

Geographic area where economic activity between and within countries is less regulated

A free-trade zone (FTZ) is a class of special economic zone. It is a geographic area where goods may be imported, stored, handled, manufactured, or reconfigured and re-exported under specific customs regulation and generally not subject to customs duty. Free trade zones are generally organized around major seaports, international airports, and national frontiers—areas with many geographic advantages for trade.

== Definition ==
The World Bank defines free trade zones as "small, fenced-in, duty-free areas, offering warehousing, storage, and distribution facilities for trade, transshipment, and re-export operations". Free-trade zones can also be defined as labor-intensive manufacturing centers that involve the import of raw materials or components and the export of factory products, but this is a dated definition as more and more free-trade zones focus on service industries such as software, back-office operations, research, and financial services.

=== Synonyms ===
Free-trade zones are referred to as "foreign-trade zones" in the United States of America (Foreign-Trade Zones Act of 1934), where FTZs provide customs-related advantages as well as exemptions from state and local inventory taxes. In some other countries, they have been called "duty-free export processing zones", "export-free zones", "export processing zones", "free export zones", "free zones" (Spanish: zona franca), "industrial free zones", "investment promotion zones", "maquiladoras", and "special economic zones". Some were previously called "free ports" (Italian: porto franco, Spanish: puerto libre). Free zones range from specific-purpose manufacturing facilities to areas where legal systems and economic regulation vary from the normal provisions of the country concerned.

Free zones may reduce or eliminate taxes, customs duties, and regulatory requirements for registration of business. Zones around the world often provide special exemptions from normal immigration procedures and foreign investment restrictions as well as other features. Free zones are intended to foster economic activity and employment that could occur elsewhere.

== Export-processing zone ==
An export-processing zone (EPZ) is a specific type of FTZ usually set up in developing countries by their governments to promote industrial and commercial exports. According to the World Bank, "an export processing zone is an industrial estate, usually a fenced-in area of 10 to 300 hectares, that specializes in manufacturing for export. It offers firms free trade conditions and a liberal regulatory environment. Its objectives are to attract foreign investors, collaborators, and buyers who can facilitate entry into the world market for some of the economy's industrial goods, thus generating employment and foreign exchange". Most FTZs are located in developing countries; Brazil, Colombia, India, Indonesia, El Salvador, China, the Philippines, Malaysia, Bangladesh, Nigeria, Pakistan, Mexico, the Dominican Republic, Costa Rica, Honduras, Guatemala, Kenya, Sri Lanka, Mauritius, and Madagascar all have EPZ programs. In 1997, 93 countries had set up export processing zones, employing 22.5 million people, and five years later, in 2003, EPZs in 116 countries employed 43 million people.

=== Brazil ===
In Brazil, 25 Export-Processing Zones have been authorized in 17 states, and 19 of them have been implemented. The Brazilian government launched the first Export processing zones in 1988, aiming to fight the imbalances in the country. The first EPZ area was located near the Port of Pecém in Ceará. Companies in these areas are benefitting from tax exemptions and incentives at the ICMS Tax (State Value-Added Tax). Some Brazilian states offer other regional incentives. Companies can also take advantage of a foreign exchange treatment supported by the law that created the EPZs and proximity of customs authorities who have offices inside the EPZ.

=== China ===
China introduced its pilot free trade zones (FTZs) in September 2013 as part of its response to external uncertainties triggered by the global financial crisis (GFC) and to explore new ways to deepen its reform and opening-up process. Since then, China has established 21 FTZs involving 51 cities. From a global perspective, FTZs are, on the one hand, analogous to special economic zones (SEZs). SEZs are known by different names in the legislation of individual countries, such as industrial hubs, export-processing zones, industrial parks and innovation hubs. However, fiscal and regulatory incentives, together with infrastructure support, are common features intended to facilitate industrial activity.

Over the past decade, China's 21 pilot FTZs have contributed to updates in the country's development strategies, deeper economic integration, the promotion of trade and foreign direct investment (FDI), and the development of higher-quality industries. According to the Ministry of Commerce (MOFCOM), China has implemented more than 3,400 "pilot reform assignments" across its 21 FTZs as part of its efforts to promote institutional innovation, and has replicated 302 institutional innovations at the national level. In terms of facilitating industrial transformation, FTZs have promoted high-quality industrial agglomeration through reforms in trade, investment, finance, science and technology policies. They have also supported the development of financial and shipping services.

In 2022, despite covering less than 0.4% of China's land area, FTZs accounted for 18.1% of the country's foreign direct investment (FDI) inflows and 18.1% of its total imports and exports. Alongside the growth of trade and FDI in FTZs, the composition of Chinese exports has shifted towards technologically intensive goods, including electrical and electronic products, computers, vehicles and machinery, reflecting advances in technological capabilities. FTZs have also strengthened China's economic cooperation and integration with other developing economies in the region, particularly those in the Association of Southeast Asian Nations (ASEAN).

China has specific rules differentiating an EPZ from a FTZ. For example, 70% of goods in EPZs must be exported, but there is no such quota for FTZs.

== Africa ==
Over time, several trade and regional economic integration organizations have emerged, with the AfCFTA being the most significant endeavour in this direction to improve economic growth and reduce poverty on the continent. The African Continental Free Trade Area (AfCFTA) has been a pivotal initiative with the potential to reshape the economic landscape of Africa, despite concerns regarding the equitable distribution of gains and the imperative of effective policy implementation to ensure inclusive economic transformation and industrialization. AfCFTA represents a monumental effort involving 54 of the 55 African Union member states (excluding Eritrea), covering a population of 1.3 billion and a combined GDP of $3.4 trillion. Its establishment as the largest free trade area globally holds promise for fostering economic integration and development across Africa. However, challenges such as lengthy transit times, high transportation costs, and administrative complexities have impeded its full realization.

Again, issues such as economic disparities among member states, challenges in implementation and the persistence of non-trade barriers pose significant hurdles to realizing the agreement’s full potential. The initiative aims to not only enhance trade volumes but also stimulate industrialization, improve infrastructure and attract foreign direct investment (FDI). The implementation of AfCFTA has made substantial progress, with 47 countries ratifying the agreement by December 2023 and several protocols finalized on competition, investment and intellectual property. A related example of digital trade cooperation in Africa is Rwanda's partnership. In 2018, Rwanda became the first African country to establish an Electronic World Trade Platform (eWTP) hub with an e-commerce company to help small and medium-sized enterprises (SMEs) access international markets, particularly China. The partnership also supported business development through the eFounders Fellowship Programme, implemented with UNCTAD. According to the Rwanda Development Board, sales volumes of Rwandan coffee through the company's e-commerce platforms increased by 700%, demonstrating the potential of e-commerce to expand market access for African businesses.

== Free economic zone ==
Free economic zones (FEZ), free economic territories (FETs) or free zones (FZ) are a class of special economic zone (SEZ) designated by the trade and commerce administrations of various countries. The term is used to designate areas in which companies are taxed very lightly or not at all to encourage economic activity. The taxation rules and duties are determined by each country. The World Trade Organization (WTO) Agreement on Subsidies and Countervailing Measures (SCM) has content on the conditions and benefits of free zones.

Some special economic zones are called free ports or free trade ports. Sometimes they have historically been endowed with favorable customs regulations, such as the free port of Trieste, or the newer free trade port on Hainan Island.

=== Definition ===
The definition should be understood in meaning The International Convention on the Simplification and Harmonization of Customs Procedures (Revised Kyoto Convention) uses the term "free zones" which the revised convention describes as "a part of the territory of a Contracting Party where any goods introduced are generally regarded, insofar as import duties and taxes are concerned, as being outside the customs territory".

According to the World Bank, the main types of special economic zones are:

1. Free-trade zones (FTZ)
2. Export processing zones (EPZ)
3. Free economic zones (FZ/FEZ)
4. Industrial parks/estates (IE)
5. Free ports
6. Bonded logistics parks (BLP)
7. Urban enterprise zones

=== History ===
An early type of special economic zone was free ports, these historically were endowed with favorable customs regulations. In modern times, free port has come to mean a specific type of special economic zone, for example LADOL.

All "free ports" in the world were permitted by the respective states, save the Free Port of Trieste that with the signing of the 16th Resolution of the Security Council of the United Nations (10 January 1947) and the signing of the Treaty of Peace with Italy (10 February 1947, ratified 15 September 1947) was put territorially under the sovereignty of the United Nations itself. As cited on Annex VIII, Article 3, paragraph 2: "The establishment of special zones in the Free Port under the exclusive jurisdiction of any State is incompatible with the status of the Free Territory and of the Free Port". For example, it was not possible to apply the "Italian Law on Ports" in the extraterritorial free zones of the UN Free Port of Trieste with the effect that all actual territorial concessions were null and void.

== Background ==
The world's first-documented free-trade zone was established on the Greek Island of Delos in 166 BCE. It lasted until about 69 BCE when the island was overrun by pirates. The Romans had many civitas libera, or free cities, some of which could coin money, establish their own laws, and not pay an annual tribute to the Roman Emperor. These continued through at least the first millennium CE. In the 12th century, the Hanseatic League began operating in Northern Europe and established trading colonies throughout Europe. These Free Trade Zones included Hamburg and the Steelyard in London. The Steelyard, like other Hansa stations, was a separate walled community with its own warehouses, weighing house, chapel, counting houses, and residential quarters. In 1988, remains of the former Hanseatic trading house, once the largest medieval trading complex in Britain, were uncovered by archaeologists during maintenance work on Cannon Street Station. Shannon, Ireland (Shannon Free Zone), established in 1959, has claimed to be the first "modern" free trade zone. The Shannon Zone was started to help the city airport adjust to a radical change in aircraft technology that permitted longer range aircraft to skip previously required refueling stops in Shannon. It was an attempt by the Irish government to maintain employment around the airport so that the airport would continue to generate revenue for the Irish economy. It was hugely successful and is still in operation today. Other free zones to note are the Kandla Free Zone in India, which started in about 1960, and the Kaohsiung Export Processing Zone in Taiwan, which started in 1967. The number of worldwide free-trade zones proliferated in the late 20th century.

Corporations setting up in a zone may be given a number of regulatory and fiscal incentives, such as the right to establish a business, the right to import parts and equipment without duty, the right to keep and use foreign exchange earnings, and sometimes income or property tax breaks. There may also be other incentives relating the methods of customs control and filing requirements. The rationale is that the zones will attract investment, create employment, and thus reduce poverty and unemployment, stimulating the area's economy. These zones are often used by multinational corporations to set up factories to produce goods (such as clothing, shoes, and electronics).

Free-trade zones should be distinguished from free trade areas. A free trade zone is normally established in a single country, although there are a few exceptions where a free zone may cross a national border, such as the Syrian/Jordanian Free Trade Zone. Free trade areas are set up between countries; for example, the Latin America Free Trade Association (LAFTA) was created in the 1960 Treaty of Montevideo by Argentina, Brazil, Chile, Mexico, Paraguay, Peru, and Uruguay; and the North American Free Trade Agreement was established between Mexico, the United States, and Canada. In free trade areas, tariffs are only lowered between member countries. They should also be distinguished from customs unions, like the former European Economic Community, where several countries agree to unify customs regulations and eliminate customs between the union members.

Free-trade zones have more recently been also called special economic zones in some countries. Special economic zones (SEZs) have been established in many countries as testing grounds for the implementation of liberal market economy principles. SEZs are viewed as instruments to enhance the acceptability and the credibility of the transformation policies and to attract domestic and foreign investment. The change in terminology has been driven by the formation of the World Trade Organization (WTO), which prohibits members from offering certain types of fiscal incentives to promote the exports of goods, thus why the term Export Processing Zone (EPZ) is no longer used with newer zones. For example, India converted all of its EPZs to SEZs in 2000.

In 1999, there were 43 million people working in about 3,000 FTZs spanning 116 countries and producing clothes, shoes, sneakers, electronics, and toys. The basic objectives of economic zones are to enhance foreign exchange earnings, develop export-oriented industries, and generate employment opportunities.

== US Foreign-Trade Zones Board ==
In the United States, the Foreign-Trade Zones Board (FTZB), established under the Foreign-Trade Zones (FTZ) Act of 1934, is led by the Secretary of Commerce and the Secretary of the Treasury.

In January 2009, the Foreign-Trade Zones Board adopted an FTZ Board staff proposal to make what it called the Alternative Site Framework (ASF) as a means of designating and managing general-purpose FTZ sites through reorganization. The ASF provides Foreign-Trade Zone grantees greater flexibility to meet specific requests for zone status by utilizing the minor boundary modification process. The theory of the ASF is that by more closely linking the amount of FTZ-designated space to the amount of space activated with Customs and Border Protection, Zone users would have better and quicker access to benefits.

When an FTZ grantee evaluates whether or not to expand its FTZ project in order to improve the ease in which the Zone may be utilized by existing companies, as well as how it attracts new prospective companies, the Alternative Site Framework (ASF) should be considered. The ASF may be an appropriate option for certain Foreign-Trade Zone projects, but the decision of whether to adopt the new framework and what the configuration of the sites should be requires careful analysis and planning. Regardless of the choice to expand the FTZ project, the sites should be selected and the application drafted in such a manner as to receive swift approval while maximizing benefit to those that locate in the Zone. Successful zone projects are generally the result of a plan developed and implemented by individuals who understand all aspects of the FTZ program.

The FTZB approves the reorganization of Foreign Trade Zone (FTZ) 32 under the alternative site framework. The application submitted by its grantee, the Greater Miami Foreign Trade Zone was approved and officially ordered by the FTZB on January 8, 2013. From California to Oklahoma, North Carolina, and New York State, FTZs all across the United States have recently been making use of the flexible opportunities offered by the Alternative Site Framework (ASF) program. The ASF program is designed to serve zone projects that want the flexibility to both attract users/operators to certain fixed sites but also want the ability to serve companies at other locations where the demand for FTZ services will arise in the future. FTZ 32 was founded in 1979 and processes over $1 billion in goods with products from more than 65 countries and exported to more than 75 countries worldwide with speed and efficiency. According to the official order from the FTZB, FTZ 32 existing site 1, Miami Free Zone, will be classified as a magnet site.

== UAE Free Zones ==
Due to growing business opportunities in the United Arab Emirates (UAE), the UAE government has introduced 'Free Zones' to make it easier for foreigners to invest and operate in the UAE. In these Free Zones, investors benefit from maintaining full business ownership and receiving tax exemptions.

Some of the benefits of setting up business in UAE Free Zones are:

- No Corporate Tax, 100% exemption provided that business done between the free zone company and any mainland companies are under 375,000 AED a year.
- 100% ownership of business
- Bank accounts can be opened in a business's name
- Reasonable renewal fees
- 100% import and export tax exemptions
- 100% repatriation of profits and capital
- Investor VISA

Some Free Zones in UAE are:

- Meydan Free Zone (MFZ)
- Ajman Free Zone
- Ras Al Khaimah Economic Zone (RAKEZ)
- International Free Zone Authority (IFZA)
- Sharjah Media City Free Zone (SHAMS)
- Hamriyah Free Zone

== Kuwait Free Trade Zone ==
Kuwait's free trade zone (FTZ) was formally established in 1999 to expand businesses and lure the export industry. The zone was located in the western part of the commercial port of Shuwaikh. It was the only free trade zone in the country.

In 2019, the Council of Ministers cancelled the free-zone, leaving Kuwait without a special economic zone.

== Strategic benefits ==
Aberdeen Group research published in 2013 noted that best-in-class companies make strategic use of free-trade zones as a means of reducing inbound trade costs, shortening import timescales, and optimising the balance of their corporate sourcing and operational activities.

== Criminal use ==
The European Union, in 2020, introduced new stricter rules to identify and report suspicious activities at free ports and zones in response to the "high incidence of corruption, tax evasion, and criminal activity", with a further review to take place in the following year. The European Parliament suggested that increasing demand for free ports could be partly a response to global crackdowns on tax evasion. The European Commission in a report said that free ports were popular for the storage of art, precious stones, antiques, gold, and wine as alternative assets to cash, and posed an emerging threat in multiple ways: allowing counterfeiters to land consignments and tamper with loads and paperwork, then re-export the products without customs formalities, disguising the actual origin and nature of the goods and their supplier. The commission said they were also used for narcotics trafficking, the illegal ivory trade, people smuggling, VAT fraud, corruption and money laundering. "Legal businesses owned by criminals remain key to money-laundering activities ... free ports are perceived as facilities that protect their clients' identity and financial dealings, much as private banks used to."

As an example, the commission cited Swiss authorities' 2016 seizure of cultural relics looted from the Middle East being stored in Geneva's free ports.

The free port system has been accused of facilitating international art crime, allowing stolen artworks to remain undetected in storage for decades. Freeports' lax regulation enables criminals to operate in secrecy. Freeports may facilitate money laundering and tax evasion by obscuring the real beneficial owners of criminal assets, which hinders authorities' efforts to trace criminal profits and recover taxes.

=== Regulatory Compliance, Risks, and Controversies ===
While FTZs offer economic benefits, they are also associated with significant regulatory risks and have been the subject of international criticism and scrutiny.

- Customs Fraud and Illicit Trade: The relaxed customs environment can be exploited for illegal diversion of goods into the domestic market, origin fraud, and trafficking in counterfeit goods. The Financial Action Task Force (FATF) has identified FTZs as vulnerable to trade-based money laundering due to the high volume and complexity of transactions.
- Labor and Environmental Standards: Some zones, particularly Export Processing Zones (EPZs), have been criticized for offering exemptions from national labor laws, leading to allegations of poor working conditions, suppression of unionization, and low wages—a phenomenon termed the "race to the bottom". Similar exemptions can apply to environmental regulations.

== Criticism ==
Sometimes the domestic government pays part of the initial cost of factory setup, loosens environmental protections and rules regarding negligence and the treatment of workers, and promises not to ask payment of taxes for the next few years. When the taxation-free years are over, the corporation that set up the factory without fully assuming its costs is often able to set up operations elsewhere for less expense than the taxes to be paid, giving it leverage to take the host government to the bargaining table with more demands, but parent companies in the United States are rarely held accountable.

Political writer Naomi Klein has also criticized the transient nature of FTZs, noting the factory closures connected to the 1997 Asian financial crisis. She criticized the low wages and long hours, citing workdays of twelve or more hours in Indonesia, Philippines, Southern China, and Sri Lanka circa 2000.

== See also ==
- Aggressive legalism
- Bonded logistics park
- Foreign trade zones of the United States
- Free trade areas in Europe
- Free economic zone
- Free-trade area
- Free trade
- Open Balkan
- Craiova Group
- CEFTA
- Index of international trade topics
- List of free-trade zones
- List of free-trade zones in Dubai
- Shanghai Free-Trade Zone
- Special economic zone
- Factory (trading post)
- Bonded warehouse
- Four Asian Tigers

== Bibliography ==
- "Specific Annex D: Customs Warehouses and Free Zones", International Convention on the Simplication and Harmonization of Customs Procedures (Revised Kyoto Convention), World Customs Organization, 1999
