= Mohammed bin Rashid Global Initiatives =

Foundation based in the United Arab Emirates

Mohammed Bin Rashid Al Maktoum Global Initiatives
- مبادرات محمد بن راشد آل مكتوم العالمية
- Abbreviation: MBRGI
- Named after: Sheikh Mohammed Bin Rashid Al Maktoum
- Formation: October 2015; 11 years ago
- Secretary General: Mohammad Al Gergawi
- Chairman: Sheikh Mohammed Bin Rashid Al Maktoum
- Deputy Chairman: Sheikh Hamdan bin Mohammed Al Maktoum
- Website: www.almaktouminitiatives.org

The Mohammed Bin Rashid Al Maktoum Global Initiatives (MBRGI) is a philanthropic foundation based in the United Arab Emirates (UAE). It was established in October 2015 to consolidate various charitable and developmental initiatives previously overseen by Sheikh Mohammed bin Rashid Al Maktoum, the Vice President and Prime Minister of the UAE and Ruler of Dubai.

== Structure and focus ==
The foundation's board of trustees is chaired by Sheikh Mohammed bin Rashid Al Maktoum. The Crown Prince of Dubai, Sheikh Hamdan bin Mohammed Al Maktoum, serves as the deputy chairman, and Mohammad Al Gergawi is the secretary general.

The MBRGI organizes its work into five main pillars: humanitarian aid and relief, healthcare and disease control, spreading education and knowledge, innovation and entrepreneurship, and empowering communities.

== Activities and initiatives ==
The MBRGI oversees a range of programs and organizations operating under its five pillars.

In the area of humanitarian aid and relief, the foundation supports organizations such as the International Humanitarian City (IHC), the Mohammed Bin Rashid Al Maktoum Humanitarian and Charity Establishment, UAE Water Aid (Suqia), and the UAE Food Bank.

Healthcare and disease control initiatives include the Al Jalila Foundation and Noor Dubai.

The foundation's efforts in education and knowledge encompass organizations and projects like Dubai Cares, the Mohammed Bin Rashid Al Maktoum Knowledge Foundation, the Mohammed Bin Rashid Library, and the Arab Reading Challenge. In 2017, the MBRGI launched the Mohammed bin Rashid Arabic eLearning Project.

Programs focused on innovation and entrepreneurship include the Dubai Future Foundation, Dubai SME, and various business awards.

Initiatives aimed at empowering communities involve projects like Arab Hope Makers, the International Institute for Tolerance (established in 2017), the Arab Journalism Award, and the Arab Media Forum. The foundation also supports leadership development and sports through organizations like the Mohammed bin Rashid School of Government and the Mohammed Bin Rashid Al Maktoum Creative Sports Award.
