= Dubai Industrial Park =

Coordinates: 24°51′13″N 55°3′53″E

Dubai Industrial City
- Type: Industrial park
- Industry: Manufacturing and logistics
- Founded: 2004
- Headquarters: Dubai, United Arab Emirates
- Key people: Abdulla BelHoul (CEO)
- Website: dubaiindustrialcity.ae

Dubai Industrial City is the dedicated industrial park in Dubai, UAE, founded in 2004, covering an area of 560,000,000 square feet (52 km^{2}; 20 sq mi).

== Overview ==
The Industrial City includes food and beverage zones, base-metal and transportation zones, warehouses and an extensive conservation area. These areas are complemented with logistics, educational and mixed use developments. It is located near Al Maktoum Airport and Jebel Ali International Airport along Emirates Road. The city is expected to accommodate around 500,000 people when it is completed by 2015.

Dubai Industrial City encompasses six zones:

- Zone 1: Food and Beverage
- Zone 2: Transport Equipment and Parts
- Zone 3: Machinery and Equipment
- Zone 4: Mineral Products
- Zone 5: Base Metal
- Zone 6: Chemicals

International Humanitarian City is located to the northeast.

== Developments ==
In March 2009, the construction of Dubai industrial city's warehouses was completed, with the whole project then aimed for completion in 2015.

== See also ==
- Dubai TechnoPark
- International Humanitarian City
