= Dubai Airport Freezone =

Free economic zone in the United Arab Emirates

Dubai Airport Free Zone
- Abbreviation: DAFZ
- Founded: 1996
- Type: Developer and Operator
- Headquarters: Dubai, United Arab Emirates
- Region served: Global
- Key people: Sheikh Ahmed Bin Saeed Al Maktoum (Chairman); Dr Mohammed al Zarooni (Director General)
- Website: https://www.dafz.ae/en/

Dubai Airport Freezone (commonly abbreviated as DAFZ) is a designated free economic zone in Dubai, United Arab Emirates, providing company formation and business setup services in Dubai. DAFZ is home to more than 2,000 registered businesses from over 20+ sectors and various industries, with 20,000+ professionals.

== History ==
DAFZ was established in 1996. It came into being as a part of the Dubai government's strategic plan to make Dubai an investment-driven economy. Today, it is one of the fastest-growing and pioneering free zones in the region, contributing to around 4.7 percent of Dubai's gross domestic product. It allows international investors a completely duty-free business setup and execution of services, along with complete foreign ownership and no currency restrictions.

Spanning over an area of 696,000 square meters, DAFZ includes 18 buildings and 256 warehouses. DAFZ is now home to more than 2000 registered businesses from over 20+ sectors and various industries with 20,000+ professionals, who benefit from a business-focused regulatory and tax environment that offers total ownership, full repatriation of earnings, and a range of facilities, IT and telecommunications, pharmaceuticals and cosmetics, engineering and building materials, aerospace and aviation, logistics and freight, food and beverage, jewelry, precious stones and luxury items.

In October 2020, the smart police station was opened in DAFZA to provide security services around the clock for workers in the free zone. The station provides 46 security services that fall under 4 packages: criminal services, traffic services, community services, and certificates and permits services.

== Free Zone business licensing ==
The following licensing options for company incorporation are offered to the companies that are willing to set up their businesses at DAFZ:

- Trade License: It allows the company to conduct trading activities like Import, export, distribution, and storage of products.
- Service License: A license tailor-made for service-catered businesses. Example: IT Services.
- Industrial License: For carrying out light manufacturing, industrial activities, packaging, and assembling.
- E-Commerce License: For conducting trade of goods and services over the internet.
- General Trading License: For trading in general items including import, export, re-export, storage, and distribution.
- Dual License with the Department of Economic Development (DED): This allows DAFZ companies to apply for a DED license without a physical office space in the mainland, operating outside of DAFZ’s premises.

== Services ==
DAFZ provides numerous services such as:

Business Setup Services:

- Leasing and Licensing
- Visa Services
- Dedicated Government Service Centers

Business Operational Services:

- Interiors and Facility Management Services.
- Information & Communication Technology.
- Security Services.
- Various facilities (food court, retail area, travel agencies and more).
- Business setup services.

== Initiatives ==
- Dubai Blink: Contributing to Dubai 10X Initiative, DAFZ launched its Dubai Blink Project, which focuses on being the world's first e-commerce platform for free zone companies by utilizing artificial intelligence, blockchain technology and virtual business licenses.
- FZ Exchange: Free Zone Exchange (FZ Exchange) initiative enables free zone companies to become public shareholding companies, listing themselves in the financial market to increase their capital, enhancing their activities’ presence, and creating a stable environment for foreign investments in Dubai and the UAE.
- Internal Launchpad Program: Includes an electronic platform for suggestions, a business incubator and a contribution platform of skills and expertise aimed at developing an "innovative environment".
- The Global Gateway to Halal Industry: A Guidebook titled ‘Dubai: The Global Gateway to Halal Industries’ was launched at an exhibition in Europe to encourage international investors to invest in the biggest halal food & Beverage market in the UAE. A step-by-step guide on trading and investing in the halal industry of the UAE, the guidebook was published in both Portuguese and Spanish languages.
- Developing Innovation Systems for Government Services: Promoting innovation and cooperation between free zones and government sectors to ease foreign investments in Dubai.
- Digital Intelligence Initiative: Focusing on establishing an integrated and sustainable digital system, based on three main axis: the operational model of Information and Communications Technology (ICT) management, modernization of the Information Technology (IT) platforms, and ICT services.
- Smart Office Initiative: An interactive platform for international companies to explore the local and regional markets and study available investment opportunities enabled by Dubai's leading position in the global economy.

== Awards and recognition ==
- Awarded the 'Best Technology Award' for its Smart E-Gate Pass program during the 30th session of Ideas UK.
- Earned a Platinum Certification from Leadership in Environmental and Energy Design (LEED) through its efforts in sustainability in the 'Operations Maintenance of Existing Buildings' at its main building.
- Earned a golden certification from the Leadership in Environmental and Energy Design (LEED) for the Project of Developing the Building 8W within 'DAFZA Square'.
- Presented with the 'Emirates Energy Award' in the Golden Category from the Dubai Supreme Council of Energy.
- Granted, 'The Best Smart Initiative Award 2016' during the 'Big 5' awarding ceremony.
- DAFZ and DAFZ Industrial Park were among the 20 free zones selected by the Cabinet Decision No. (59) of 2017, to be considered as designated zones.
- During the World Government Summit 2018, His Highness Sheikh Hamdan bin Mohammed bin Rashid Al Maktoum, Crown Prince of Dubai, and Chairman of the Executive Council announced the approved projects, which included DAFZ's Dubai Blink and the Free Zone Exchange Projects to be implemented over 24 months.
- Earned a platinum certification from Leadership in Environmental and Energy Design (LEED) in the operations of existing buildings.
