= List of Industrial areas in Dubai =

These are the list of Industrial areas in Dubai.

	Industrial Area	Area (hectares)	Remarks
1	Ras Al Khor Industrial Area	661 hectares	
2	Al Quoz Industrial area	1,838 hectares	
3	Al Safa area	20 hectares	Only for consumer food and production stuff.
4	Al Khubaisi Area	102 hectares	
5	Um Ramool Industrial Area	391 hectares	
6	Al Qusais Industrial Area	545 hectares	
7	Jebel Ali Industrial Area	84 hectares	

== See also ==
- List of communities in Dubai
- Developments in Dubai
- List of development projects in Dubai
