= Ajman Free Zone =

Free trade zone in the UAE

Ajman Free Zone (AFZA) (Arabic: منطقة عجمان الحرة) is a free trade zone and one of the designated freezones located in Ajman, United Arab Emirates (UAE). First established in 1988, it is one of a number of unbonded free zones in the UAE offering offshore company setup and operation to investors. As of Q1 2018, 12,362 companies operated out of AFZA.

The UAE's free trade zones are a major economic contributor, with 2017 exports from UAE free zones of Dhs 225.5 billion in 2017 representing some 19.5% of total exports. Of a total of 45 free zones in the UAE, 30 are located in Dubai. A further ten zones are currently under construction in the country.

== Business services ==
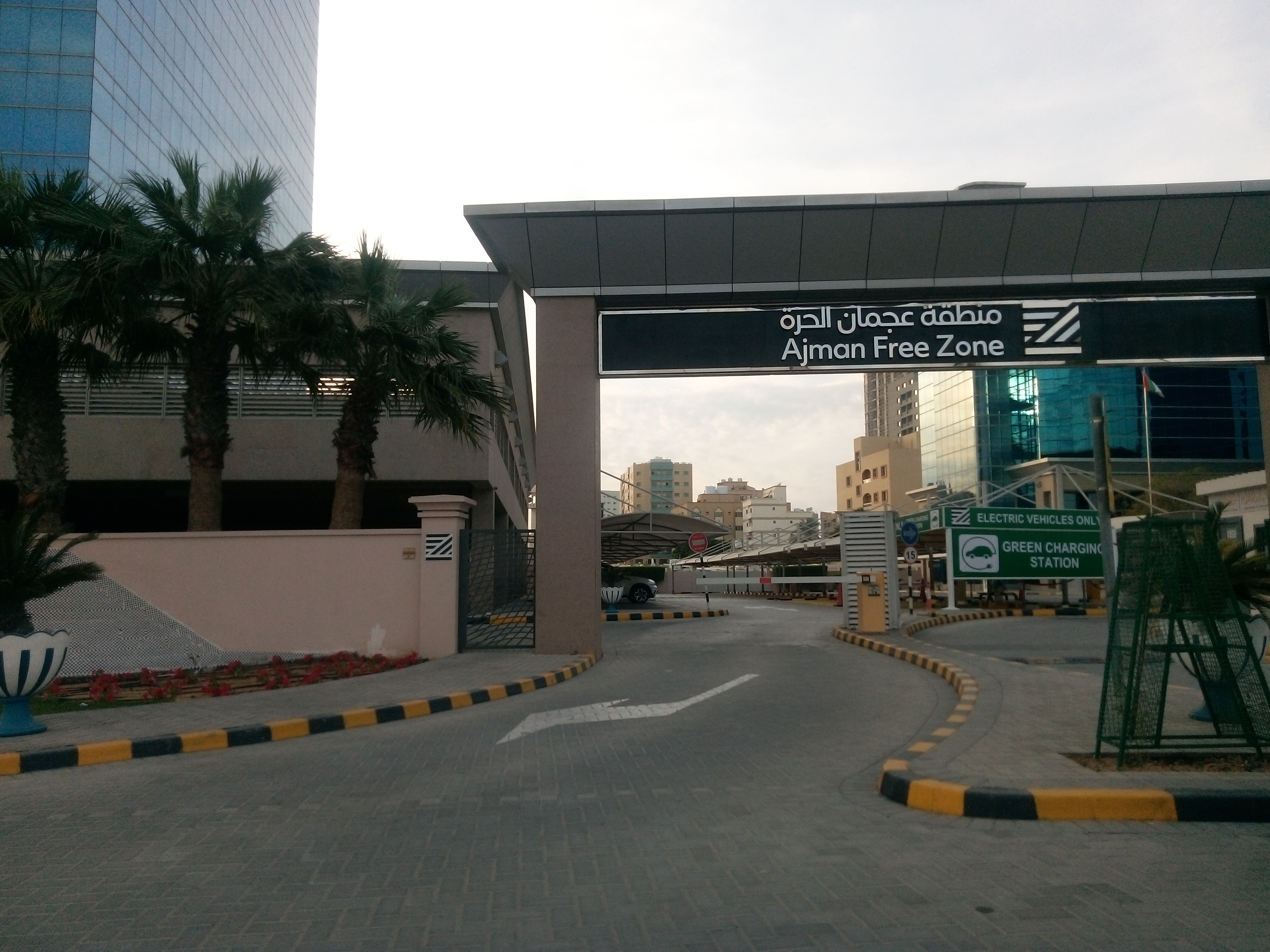
Entrance

Businesses in the UAE require a trade license, which is renewed annually. Onshore trade licenses are generally available with 49% foreign ownership, requiring a local partner or sponsor. Sponsorship fees can range from Dhs20,000-2 million per year. A legislative change announced in May 2018 allowed for 100% foreign ownership of onshore businesses, alongside a 10-year 'Golden' residency visa for certain categories of investor and professionals.

AFZA allows investors to set up companies and trade with 100% foreign ownership and no taxation. Its services include the provision of visas for expatriate workers, land for development or pre-existing warehousing and business premises supporting a range of business types, including 'smart offices' - co-working spaces. Business licenses at AFZA are annually renewable and costs start from UAE Dhs 11,900.

The UAE levies a 5% Value Added Tax, from which companies at AFZA are exempt when trading between free zones or internally. However, the tax is levied on goods and services traded onshore into the UAE.

Indian-owned businesses comprise 40% of the companies operating from AFZA, which is growing at a rate of 28% new business registrations year on year (of which 46% were import and export businesses). A number of international representative, sales and promotion offices support new registrations to the Zone.

=== Ajman Media City Free Zone ===
Operating independently of AFZA, Ajman Media City Free Zone was launched in 2018, some three years after the Emiri Decree to establish the zone was issued. The zone offers a range of small company licensing services to media-related businesses.

== See also ==
- List of company registers
