= Ras Al Khaimah Economic Zone =

Ras Al Khaimah Economic Zone (RAKEZ) is an Emirati free-trade zone in Ras Al Khaimah in United Arab Emirates. In January 2020, Entrepreneur reported the free zone to have 14,000 companies across 50 industries.

== History ==
It was introduced in 2017 and is one of the 37 free zones across the United Arab Emirates that are overseen by the Ras Al Khaimah Investment Authority. During COVID-19 pandemic, RAKEZ moved towards digitisation and was reported to have 20% growth in 2020.

The Free zone also launched a scheme to provide 12 years visa for investors purchasing an apartment in the zone in partnership with real estate developers Al Hamra. RAKEZ allows a one hundred percent foreign ownership.
