= Dubai Production City =

Free economic zone in Dubai, UAE

Coordinates: 25.0324931°N 55.1713172°E

- Native name: مدينة دبي للإنتاج
- Formerly: International Media Production Zone (IMPZ)
- Company type: Free Economic Zone
- Founded: July 2003, Dubai Holding subsidiary TECOM Group
- Headquarters: Me'aisem 1, Dubai, United Arab Emirates
- Key people: Majed Al Suwaidi (Managing Director)
- Owner: Tecom Group
- Website: http://www.dpc.ae/

Dubai Production City (DPC) (Arabic: مدينة دبي للإنتاج), formerly known as International Media Production Zone (IMPZ), is a free zone and freehold area that caters to media production companies in Dubai, United Arab Emirates. It is located in Me'aisem 1. The DPC spreads over an area of 43,000,000 square feet (4,000,000 m^{2}) on Sheikh Mohammad Bin Zayed Road, near Dubai Sports City, Jumeirah Golf Estates and Jumeirah Village. The Dubai government has plans to convert this area into the next generation of Dubai Media City.

Dubai Production City logo, 2023

DPC was launched in 2003.

== See also ==
- Radio and television channels of Dubai
- Egyptian Media Production City
