= Ras Al Khaimah Investment Authority =

Sovereign wealth fund of Ra's Al Khaimah

Ras Al Khaimah Investment Authority (RAKIA) is a United Arab Emirates investment authority in the Emirate of Ras Al Khaimah. It issues licenses to operate within RAKIA owned special economic zones, provides business facilities and warehouses and provides investment funding.

RAKIA supports developments that include industrial parks, education, technology, real estate, transportation, manufacturing and energy, as well as offshore operations and other investments.

RAKIA is not a sovereign wealth fund (SWF) that would rely on steady income from state resources, such as oil or gas. Instead, RAKIA is an industrial licensing and promotion agency to attract investments into Ras Al-Khaimah. Funding is derived by the Government of Ras Al Khaimah as the owner or RAKIA by raising funds from financial markets and passing this borrowed money on to RAKIA.

== History ==
RAKIA was constituted in 2005 by Emiri Decree No. (2)/2005 issued by Sheikh Saqr Bin Muhammad Al Qasimi with the aim of reinforcing the investment climate of the Emirate of Ras Al Khaimah within the United Arab Emirates and promoting various economic sectors.

Its establishment was linked to a World Bank study and investment promotion event in May 2005 ("Invest and Live in Ras Al Khaimah") initiated and pursued by the Swiss-Lebanese engineer Khater Massaad who was a long-time adviser to Sheikh Saud Bin Saqr Al-Qasimi, the creator of RAK Ceramics and the longtime CEO of RAKIA.

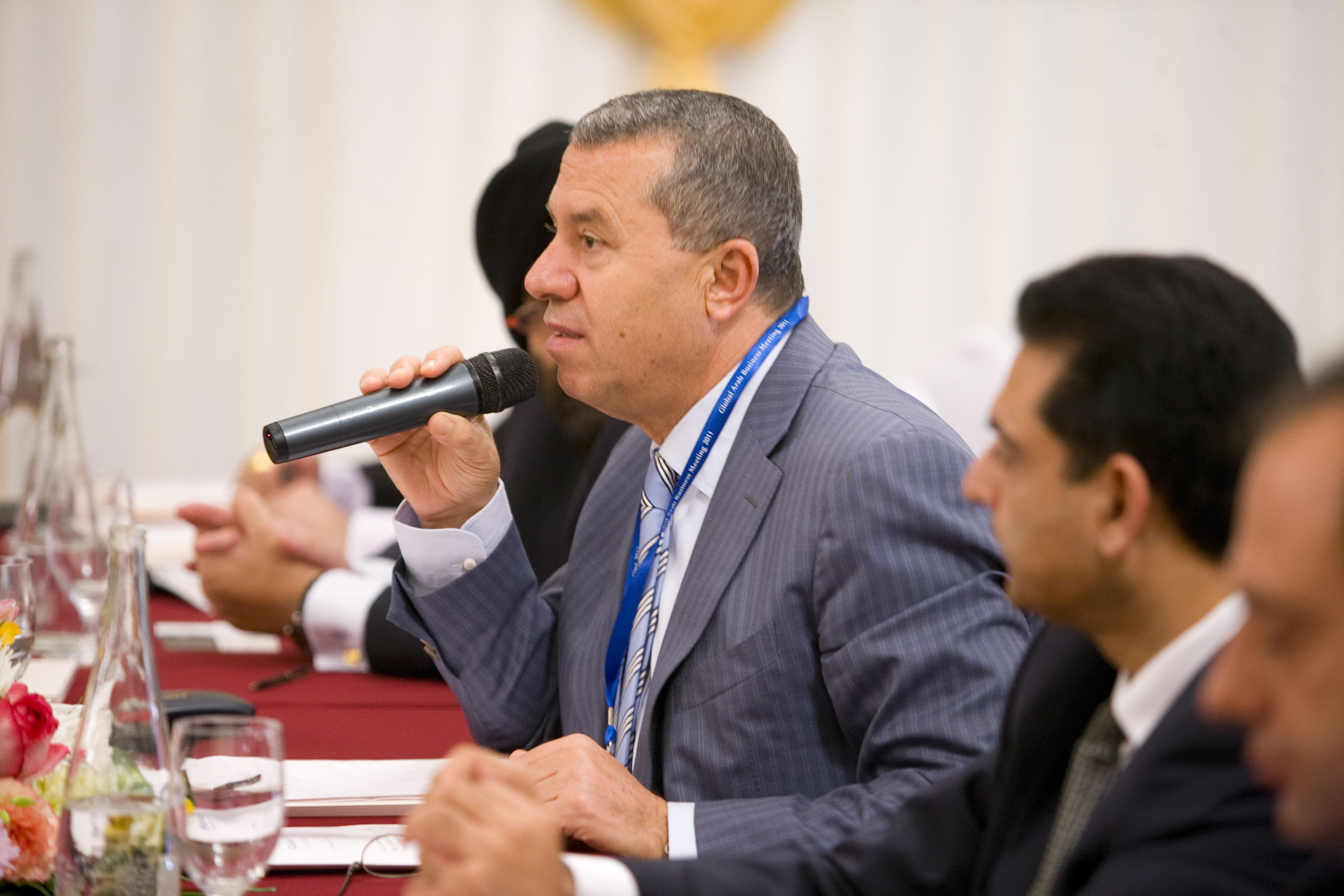
Khater Massaad, then CEO of RAKIA, at the October 2011 Horasis Global Arab Business Meeting

In 2017, Ras Al Khaimah Free Trade Zone (RAK FTZ) and RAKIA became part of a larger group, the Ras Al Khaimah Economic Zone (RAKEZ).

== Services ==
As per the Emiri Decree No. (32) of 2012 issued by Sheikh Saud Bin Saqr Al-Qasimi, the scope of services offered by RAKIA includes:

- issuing of all types of business licenses operating in the industrial parks and free zones belonging to RAKIA
- providing facilities for business (industrial land, warehouse, office space etc.)
- issuing licenses for offshore companies

== Investments abroad ==
RAKIA investments abroad include operations in Georgia, notably shares in Poti Sea Port (directly through RAKIA in the UAE), in the Sheraton Metechi Palace Hotel in the capital Tbilisi (through its subsidiary RAKIA Georgia LLC), and the Poti Port Free Industrial Zone (through the subsidiary RAKIA Georgia FIZ LLC). In both Georgian entities, 15 percent of RAKIA shares were alienated in 2011 to the UK based Manline Projects LLP owned by Georgian businessman Gela ("Zaza") Mikadze. RAKIA's Sheraton Metechi Palace Hotel in the capital Tbilisi was sold to an Iranian investor in December 2011 but payments for this transaction have not yet been completed as of July 2013.

== Cancelled Real Madrid resort island ==
In June 2013, the highly advertised plans to build a US$1 billion Real Madrid resort island in Ras Al Khaimah had to be cancelled due to the lack of funding. The project, announced only in March 2012, was supposed to be a joint venture between the Spanish football team, the government of Ras Al Khaimah and the Luxembourg-based RAK Marjan Island Football Investment Fund. RAKIA confirmed that the resort stood no chance of opening. In addition to the financial deficiencies, the project had come under criticism in international sports circles, as Real Madrid was required by Ras Al Khaimah to remove the Christian symbol of the cross from the crown atop their logo on all the project's promotional materials to conform with Muslim beliefs.
