= Meydan Free Zone =

Free trade zone in Dubai

- Formation: 2009
- Headquarters: Dubai, United Arab Emirates
- Services: UAE-based free zone
- Key people: Sheikh Mohammed Bin Rashid Al Maktoum
- Website: www.meydanfz.ae

Meydan Free Zone was established in 2009 under Ruler’s Decree No. 5. It is a free trade zone in Dubai, UAE, designed for business growth and innovation. The Free Zone is positioned near Mohammed Bin Rashid Al Maktoum City and the Dubai Logistics Corridor, offering a prime business location.

== Overview ==
=== History ===
Meydan Free Zone was envisioned by Sheikh Mohammed Bin Rashid Al Maktoum, the Vice President and Prime Minister of the UAE and Ruler of Dubai. He established the Meydan Free Zone as part of his broader strategy to position Dubai as a global economic and business hub.

The Free Zone was created to support foreign investors and generate more business ventures that foster growth, innovation, and international trade. Since its launch, it has grown into a thriving business hub, supporting over 2,500 business activities across sectors like manufacturing, media, real estate, wholesale, retail, services, and general trading.

E-commerce has become the main focus, with several online businesses operating within the zone, benefiting from its advanced infrastructure, strategic location, and access to global markets. This has enabled e-commerce and general trading companies to expand their reach, enhance their operations, and tap into new business opportunities in Dubai.

=== Facilities and infrastructure ===
Meydan Free Zone was designed to support several businesses. The Free Zone provides open spaces, fully serviced offices, and high-end residences, ensuring that companies can access various options. Main features include The Meydan Hotel, a golf course, and the Dubai World Cup venue.

=== Business activities and services ===
Meydan Free Zone supports several business activities, including commercial, consulting, investment, and administrative operations. The Free Zone offers over 2,500 business activities related to various industries, including finance, media, retail, and manufacturing.

Businesses in the Free Zone have benefits such as foreign ownership, full capital repatriation, and access to a digital customer platform.

=== Partnerships ===
Meydan Free Zone has formed strategic partnerships with several businesses to support the growth of SMEs in Dubai. This includes signing a Memorandum of Understanding (MoU) with companies like noon.com and Aramex. These partnerships aim to provide enhanced support to small and medium-sized enterprises, helping them expand their operations in the region. In addition, other partners include 3S Exchange House, Regional Law Firm BSA Ahmad Bin Hezeem & Associates, Bayzat, Deskimo, Tasjeel, and Simpla.

The Free Zone also has active MoUs with several banks, including Dubai Islamic Bank, Bank of Baroda, Hana Bank, Abu Dhabi Islamic Bank, M Bank, Mashreq Bank, and the National Bank of Fujairah, further strengthening its commitment to supporting businesses in Dubai.

=== Strategic importance ===
Meydan Free Zone is vital to Dubai’s economic scene as it attracts international investors and businessmen. Its location and infrastructure make it a destination for businesses looking to grow in the region.

The Free Zone also hosts international events and contributes to Dubai’s standing as a global business hub. Meydan Free Zone business owners can benefit from the digital application Meydan Pay. It is a digital solution in the UAE that enables businesses to obtain an instant and guaranteed IBAN with a license. The Meydan Racecourse and the Meydan One development are prominent projects that further enhance the Free Zone’s standing within the city’s business community.

=== Governance and management ===
Meydan Free Zone operates as an entity overseen by a governing body that ensures its direction aligns with Dubai’s broader vision for economic development. The Free Zone is a part of the larger Meydan Group, an entity in real estate and development under the guidance of Sheikh Mohammed Bin Rashid Al Maktoum.

== Notable companies registered at Meydan ==
- QYUBIC
- Okadoc
- Tekunda
- Yalla Grooming
- Jeebly
- Paani
- Unispire
- Northwest Nodes
