= Jebel Ali Free Zone =

Free economic zone in Dubai, UAE

Jebel Ali Free Zone (Jafza)
- Native name: المنطقة الحرّة لجبل علي
- Romanized name: al-Munṭaqa al-Ḥurra le Jabal ʿAlī
- Type: Developer and Operator
- Industry: Logistics, Warehousing, Economic Trade Zone, Real Estate, Property
- Founded: 1985
- Headquarters: Dubai, United Arab Emirates
- Area served: Global
- Key people: Sultan Ahmed bin Sulayem (Group Chairman); Abdulla Bin Damithan (CEO & Managing Director, DP World UAE Region & CEO of Jafza); Abdulla Yaqoob Al Hashmi (Chief Operation Officer - JAFZA and UAE Region Parks and Zones
- Products: Business Centres, Office Space, Warehouses, Plots of Land and Retail Space
- Number of employees: 350+
- Parent: DP World
- Website: www.jafza.ae

Jebel Ali Free Zone (Jafza; Arabic: (جافزا) المنطقة الحرّة لجبل علي al-Munṭaqa al-Ḥurra le Jabal ʿAlī) is a free economic zone located in the Jebel Ali area at the far western end of Dubai, United Arab Emirates, near Abu Dhabi. Jebel Ali Free Zone (Jafza) is the flagship free zone of DP World, and is an integral part of DP World UAE's integrated business hub. Created under a Ruler's Decree, Jafza commenced operations in 1985 with 19 companies offering standard-size office units and warehouses to provide ready-built facilities to customers. In 1990 Jafza expanded its facilities to include light industrial units.

As of 2025, Jebel Ali Free Zone (Jafza) hosts over 11,000 businesses from more than 150 countries, including over 100 Fortune Global 500 companies.

== Overview ==
The Jebel Ali Free Zone (Jafza) is a free zone and a community. Businesses in industries such as logistics, electronics & electrical, automotive, food and agriculture, e-commerce, petrochemicals, and many more are based in Jafza.

Its proximity to Jebel Ali Port, Al Maktoum International Airport, and the Expo 2020 Dubai site has helped it carry out global trade. In 2023, 1,500 Indian companies have established their presence in JAFZA. The Bharat Mart development, is spread over 2.7 million square feet distribution hub, which is set to became the market reach for Indian products.

It is the most frequently visited foreign port for the United States Navy.

== History ==
After the opening of the Jebel Ali Port in 1979, a free economic trade zone was set up by decree of the Ruler of Dubai.

Jafza commenced operations in 1985 with 19 companies offering standard-sized office units and warehouses to provide ready-built facilities to customers. With the growing need for businesses to have office spaces in 1986, Jafza created its first set of office buildings in the free zone. In 1990, Jafza expanded its facilities to include light industrial units.

In 1998, Jafza mid-rise office buildings were constructed. Today, the mid-rise buildings called Jafza 14, Jafza 15, Jafza 16 and Jafza 17 are the primary office buildings of the free zone. Jafza 17 serves as the headquarters for DP World.

In 2007, Jafza integrated government services and enabled Jafza businesses and employees to access services from Dubai Government Departments within the free zone. In 2008, Jafza inaugurated Jafza Views 18 & 19, which are 29-story high-rise buildings.

In 2009, the Jafza Showrooms and retail spaces located on the opposite side of Gate 4 after Sheikh Zayed Road were created.

Further expansion and the growth of the free zone prompted Jafza to create commercial property Jafza One in 2016, also housing the Jafza One Convention Centre.

== Location ==
Jafza is spread over 57 square km in the Jebel Ali area at the far western end of Dubai, on the Skiekh Zayed Road (E11).

- Jafza is located at 24.984786°N, 55.0906813°E.
- The closest gate to access Jafza is Gate 4 of Jebel Ali.
- Jafza is located alongside the region's largest deep sea port in Jebel Ali, adjacent to the Dubai Expo 2020 site.
- Jafza is located 40 km from Dubai International Airport and 24 km from Al Maktoum International Airport.

== Economy ==
More than 10,500 global companies are based in Jafza. Jafza accounts for almost 32 per cent of total FDI (Foreign Direct Investment) flow into the country. The free zone contributes 21 per cent of Dubai's GDP on a yearly basis, and sustains the employment of more than 144,000 people in the United Arab Emirates. In 2015, Jafza generated trade worth US$169 billion.
