= Business activities of the government of Dubai =

Government Organization of United Arab Emirates

The government of Dubai owns controlling interests in a diverse portfolio of companies. These state-controlled investment entities grew from what was a vision of Sheikh Mohammed bin Rashid Al Maktoum's predecessors in the year 2000. Since then, the ruling Maktoum family has selected leading figures to "take over what has proven to be one of the most extraordinary success stories in global investment and development." Some examples of local companies under Dubai Inc. include Dubai World, Dubai Holding, the Emirates airline, and investment subsidiaries under Dubai World, such as Dubai Ports World, Jebel Ali Freezone, Nakheel, P&O Ferries, and others. Foreign commentators have applied the phrase Dubai Inc. to the system of business activities and government policies that complement each other to further Dubai's economic objectives.

== History ==
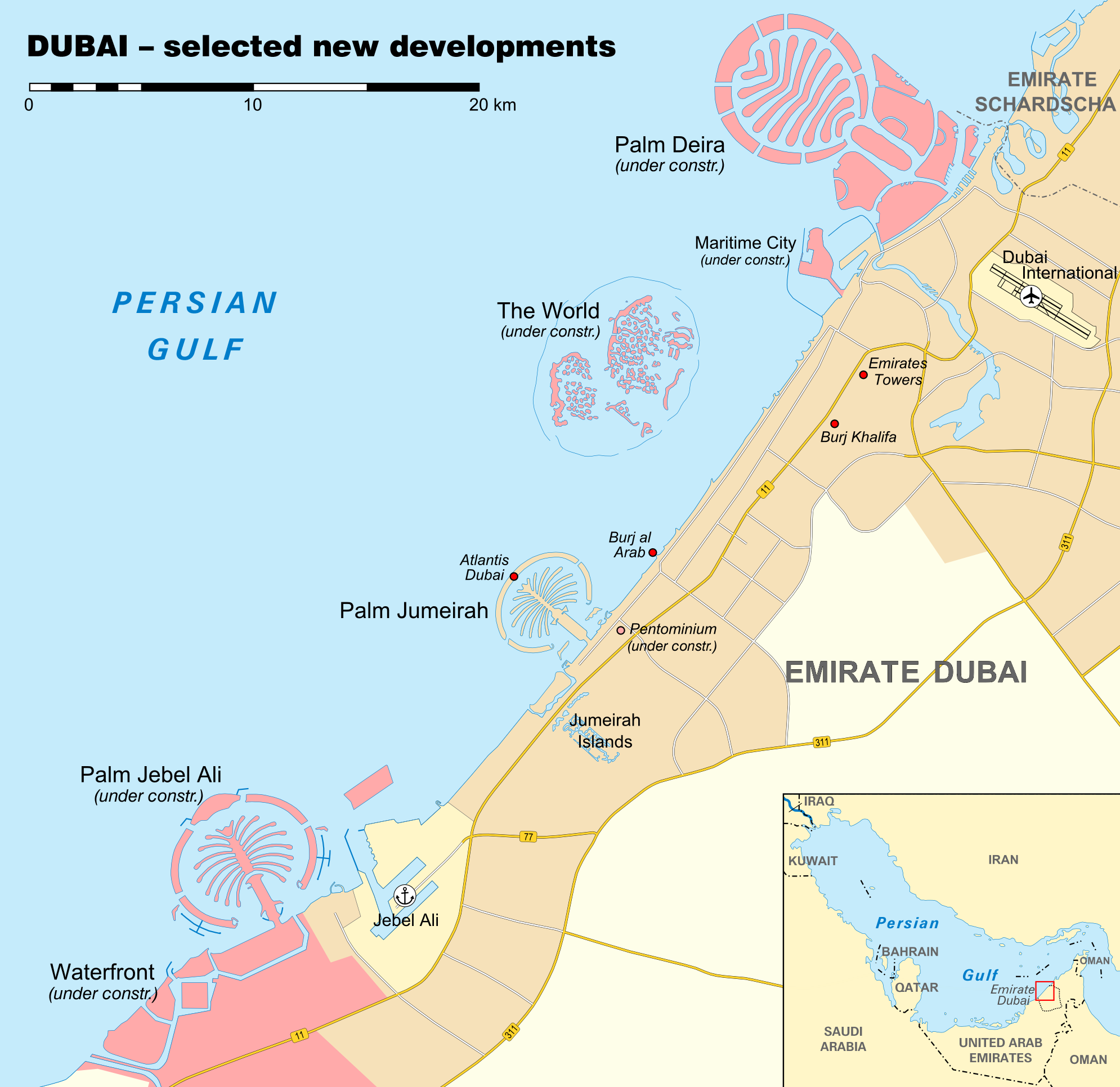
Map of Dubai

Dubai, established in the early 19th century, is one of the seven emirates that form the United Arab Emirates.

Despite being along the eastern edge of the Arabian Peninsula, Dubai is located halfway between the financial capitals of London and Singapore, giving it access to a vast number of people within a short distance. Due to its business environment, Dubai has become an attractive hub for multinational corporations helping it transform from a pit of sand along the Persian Gulf into the Singapore of the Middle East.

The start of "Dubai Inc." dates back as early as 1985 when the Prince, having had his flight canceled at the last minute, called Maurice Flanagan demanding to know how much it would cost to start up his own airline. "Ten million dollars," replied the Brit. The first plane took off in the same year, the airline operated its first flights on 25 October 1985, from Dubai to Karachi and Mumbai. Emirates now has a fleet of over 230 aircraft, flies to over 140 destinations in 80 countries, and has over 1500 planes departing from Dubai Airport every day earning it the 5th spot on the list of the world's best airlines.

Sheikh Mohammed bin Rashid Al Maktoum played a significant role in the development of Dubai's business and investment activities. He was appointed Crown Prince of Dubai on 3 January 1995 and became Ruler of Dubai in January 2006. Aside from Emirates, Sheik Mohammed has refashioned Dubai by increasing tourism, finance, and media related businesses along with Sultan Ahmed Bin Sulayem who was placed in charge of Dubai Ports (DP) and Mohammed Al Gergawi, who took over Dubai Holding. The three individuals worked hand in hand for the transformation of Dubai.

== Portfolio ==
Dubai oversees a vast portfolio of local and state-owned companies with some of the biggest organizations including Dubai World, Dubai Holding, and the Investment Corporation of Dubai (ICD).

Logo for Dubai World

=== Dubai World ===
Dubai World is a global holding company centered on strategic growth in areas such as transport and logistics; urban development; dry-dock and maritime; and investment and financial services.

Dubai World therefore is the parent company of several subsidiaries that include:

- Dubai Drydocks is the Middle East's largest shipyard facility [1].
- Dubai Ports World, a maritime company that owns over 65 marine terminals in over 6 continents.
- Istithmar World is a Dubai-based investment firm.
- Leisurecorp – an investment firm specializing in sports and leisure facilities, with golf being a primary focus.
- Maritime City – an organization involved in ship repair, conversion, shipbuilding, maritime cluster and offshore.
- Nakheel a real estate developer in Dubai, responsible for the construction of the Palm Islands, Dubai Waterfront, along with The World and The Universe artificial islands.
- P&O Ferries: One of Europe's leading ferry operators involved in freight and travel.
- Tamweel, a real estate developer based in Dubai.

=== Dubai Holding ===
Dubai Holding was established in 2004 and is a global investment holding company with operations in 24 countries. Dubai Holding has 20,000 employees and is managed through the Dubai Holding Commercial Operations Group (DHCOG) and the Dubai Holding Investment Group (DHIG). While DHCOG manages hospitality, real estate, and telecommunications, DHIG manages the financial assets of Dubai Holding company. These assets include investments and diversified financial services.

- DHCOG
  - Dubai Properties Group - A developer of locations that support the long-term development of Dubai, including destinations such as Business Bay, DubaiLand, The Walk at JBR and Culture Village. Through its subsidiaries Dubai Properties (DP) and Ejadah, the Dubai Properties Group also provides property related services such as project development and portfolio and asset management.
  - Emirates International Telecommunications - An organization that invests in telecommunications in the Middle East, North Africa, and Europe.
  - Jumeirah Group - luxury hotels and resorts.
  - TECOM Group - Formerly known as TECOM Investments, TECOM Group, a developer and operator of business communities that make a contribution to Dubai's sustainable economic growth. Through these communities, the company has provided a location for over 4,600 businesses, representing a total workforce of 74,000.
- DHIG
  - Dubai Group - Established in the year 2000, Dubai Group is a company focused on financial services such as banking, investments and insurance on local and global scales. Through various affiliates, Dubai Group operates in the Middle East and North Africa region, European Union, North America, and Asia.
  - Dubai International Capital - An investment company which primarily focuses on private equity in the Middle East and Western Europe.

=== Investment Corporation of Dubai (ICD) ===
The Investment Corporation of Dubai (ICD) was formed in 2006 in order to consolidate and manage Dubai's investment portfolio with the aim of developing and implementing government policies and investment strategies to maximize shareholder value and benefit Dubai in the long term. ICD has a portfolio that is representative of sectors that are deemed ‘strategic’ for the continued development of Dubai. Strategic sectors include Financial Industry Investment, Transportation, Energy Industries, Real Estate, Leisure, and other holdings

- Finance and Investment
  Logo for Emirates NBD
  - Borse Dubai – The holding company for Dubai Financial Market (DFM) and NASDAQ Dubai”.
  - Dubai Investments – An investment company listed on the Dubai Financial Market (DFM). Dubai Investments has over 19,800 shareholders and a paid-up capital of AED 4 billion.
  - Dubai Islamic Bank – An Islamic bank established in 1975 that is tasked with managing assets over US$1 trillion globally.
  - Emirates NBD – A bank formed in 2007 when its shares were officially listed on the DFM.
  - Others – Commercial Bank of Dubai, National Bonds, Noor Bank, Union National Bank, National Bank of Fujairah, Emirates Investment and Development, HSBC Middle East Finance Company, and Galadari Brothers Group.
- Transportation
  Logo for the airline Emirates, a subsidiary of Emirates Group.
  - Dnata – A combined air services provider with over 23,000 employees from 38 countries.
  - Dubai Aerospace Enterprise (DAE) – An aerospace company that provides aircraft leasing, repair, maintenance, and overhaul services.
  - Emirates Group – An international aviation company in charge of Emirates Airline, Marhaba, Skywards, and many other subsidiaries.
- Energy and Industrial
  - Cleveland Bridge and Engineering ME (CBEME) – A global leader in technology based engineering, construction and steel fabrication. CBME was founded in 1977 as a subsidiary of Cleveland Bridge & Engineering Company.
  - Dubai Cable Company – A cable manufacturing company.
  - Emirates Global Aluminium (EGA) – An aluminium conglomerate with interests in bauxite and primary aluminium smelting.
  - Emirates National Oil Company (ENOC) – The main energy group for the Dubai Government.
- Real Estate and Leisure
  - Emaar – A real estate and development company.
  - Atlantis The Palm – A 5 star hotel and amusement park located on the Palm.
  - Dubai Airport Free Zone (DAFZA) – Established in 1966, the free zone is located near Dubai International Airport.
  - Dubai World Trade Centre – A complex built for hosting events and exhibitions, responsibly largely for the growth of international trade in the Middle East.
  - Others – Golf in Dubai, and Dubai Silicon Oasis Authority.
- Other Holdings
  - Aswaaq – A local shopping mall.
  - Dubai Duty Free Establishment – The largest airport retailer in the world, employing over 5,600 people.
  - Emartech – The “leading technology and consulting company in the Arab World”.
  - Emirates Rawabi – Established in they year 2000, Rawabi is UAE's leading poultry and dairy producer.
  - Others – Emirates Refreshments Company

== Problems and controversies ==
=== Anticompetitive practices allegations ===
In 2015, the Partnership for Open and Fair Skies, a coalition of the three largest US airlines—Delta Air Lines, United Airlines and American Airlines—alleged that Dubai's airline, Emirates, along with Qatar Airways and Etihad Airways, has received billions of dollars' worth of government subsidies to compete in the growing airline industry. In terms of Emirates specifically, the Partnership alleged that "coordination between Emirates and its government owner, the Emirate of Dubai, is particularly brazen."

==== US airlines' argument ====
The ownership of Emirates by the Dubai government, and the government's corresponding policies and activities, allows Emirates to operate in pursuit of its government's own economic objectives, rather than by market forces like other commercial airlines.

A smaller example of this subsidy can be demonstrated through the recent TV commercial featuring Jennifer Aniston. This commercial, costing an estimated $20 million, depicts Jennifer attempting to locate the shower on a generic U.S. airlines flight. The three flight attendants laugh and tell her there are no showers on board. The scene cuts to Jennifer waking on the Emirates A380, describing her “nightmare” to the bartender while sipping a martini.

American brands like American Airlines, Delta Air Lines, and United Airlines must be careful with money since they can't use taxpayer money similar to the European carriers. The multimillion dollar ad was only the tip of the iceberg when it comes to the amount of subsidies Emirates is receiving from the government: “If you're Emirates, based in Dubai, you can install showers, butlers, and bars on your A380s because your government owners deliver wheelbarrows of subsidy cash”. Whereas U.S. airlines, or their European counterparts, must take costs into consideration and spend prudently as they themselves do not have access to state treasuries. Emirates has spent over $11 billion in the purchase of goods and services, $2.4 billion from the government's assumption of fuel hedging losses, and $2.3 billion from subsidized airport infrastructure. This mass subsidizing creates an increasingly tilted playing field for which airlines cannot compete. Not to mention, it violates the provisions of the two “Open Skies” agreements, which allowed the UAE open access to the U.S. aviation market in exchange for fair competition. This results in not only the violation of the agreement, but also harms American jobs.

==== Emirates' response ====
Emirates has since responded to allegations of subsidies and unfair competition, claiming that the allegations of these three airlines are incorrect and accusing them of having "launched an aggressive lobbying campaign in January, in a protectionist bid to restrict consumer choice, and restrict the growth of international flights to the USA operated by Emirates and other Gulf airlines." Emirates denies that it has received subsidies, and the president of the airline Tim Clark stresses that the company has "been profitable for 27 years straight". Therefore, all subsequent growth has been sourced from the company's own cash flow. Emirates says it's successful because of better business practices and a model that uses geography and long flights. Emirates estimates that the total amount of government investment since its foundation has been $218 million, an amount that pales in comparison to the $6 billion accusation made by the US airlines. This amount is also negligible for a business that earned $23.6 billion in revenue last year, and Emirates claims that the initial investment has been repaid many times over through dividends.

Furthermore, Clark argues that the US airlines have built their argument on the wrong legal standards, stating that the World Trade Organization's anti-subsidy rules are not applicable to international aviation, nor are they incorporated in US Open Skies agreements, making their claims fundamentally wrong. Clark argues that the US has "framed their complaint in terms of their own narrow interests" adding that their Open Skies agreements are favoured only when they "work to their financial advantage".

President Tim Clark of Emirates concludes that "The [US airlines'] white paper is littered with self-serving rhetoric about fair trade, [a] level playing field, and saving jobs, but their mess of legal distortions and factual errors falls apart at the slightest scrutiny”.

The full report published by Emirates in a rebuttal to the US airlines' accusation is a 400-page document, including detailed analysis and exhibits to support their case.
