= Dubai Investment Fund =

Asset and investment management company headquartered in Dubai

- Founded: December 11, 2023
- Founders: Mohammed bin Rashid Al Maktoum
- Headquarters: Dubai, United Arab Emirates
- Key people: Mohammed bin Rashied Al Maktoum (Chairman); Abdulrahman Saleh Al Saleh (Vice-chairman) and Abdulaziz Mohammed Al Mullah (CEO)
- Revenue: 49,200,000,000 United States dollar (2022)
- Operating income: 3,800,000,000 United States dollar (2022)
- Number of employees: 2,600 (2022)

The Dubai Investment Fund is a public entity created by Sheikh Mohammed bin Rashid Al Maktoum to oversee government investments.

== History ==
On December 11, 2023, the Dubai Investment Fund was founded after Sheikh Mohammed bin Rashid Al Maktoum issued a law. The fund replaced Dubai as share owner of the largest companies, it holds stakes in Dubai Taxi Company; Dubai Electric and Water Authority; Salik and other companies. Dubai World is affiliated with the fund.
