= EMPGI =

Global Education Company

Education Media and Publishing Group International (EMPGI)
- Company type: Private Company
- Industry: Education
- Founded: 2008
- Defunct: c. 2023
- Parent: Affiliate of Houghton Mifflin Harcourt
- Website: www.empgi.com

Education Media and Publishing Group International, more commonly known as EMPGI, was a Chinese education company with operations in China, India, Saudi Arabia, and Libya. EMPGI paid licensing fees to Houghton Mifflin Harcourt for exclusive overseas non-English reproduction rights to the library of content, which it then redesigns to meet local requirements in its target markets.

== History ==
EMPGI was incorporated in May 2008 as a joint venture between heavily indebted EMPG, the holding company that controls Houghton Mifflin Harcourt, and Istithmar World, a private equity vehicle of Dubai World, which is owned by the government of Dubai.
