= Inchcape Shipping Services =

British multinational ports and marine management company

- Company type: Subsidiary
- Industry: Industrial & Business Services
- Founded: 1847
- Headquarters: London, England
- Key people: Philippe Maezelle, CEO
- Parent: Epiris LLP
- Website: www.iss-shipping.com

Inchcape Shipping Services (ISS) is a British multinational ports and marine management company headquartered in London. ISS became owned by London-based private equity firm Epiris LLP, having been sold by Istithmar World, the investment arm of Dubai World in 2022.

== History ==
In 1847, William Mackinnon and Robert Mackenzie formed the Mackinnon Mackenzie Company (MMC), a general merchanting partnership based in Calcutta.

In 1999 Inchcape Shipping Services was spun out and sold to private equity firm Electra Fleming.

The firm, by then known as Electra Partners, sold ISS to Istithmar World, the investment arm of the government of Dubai, for $285m in 2006.

In February 2010, the Financial Times reported that Istithmar was looking for buyers of ISS for between $600–700m.

On 4 April 2022 it was announced that the ISS would be sold back to Epiris LLP, the latest incarnation of Electra Partners, for an undisclosed sum.

== Operations ==
ISS has operations in 60 countries across the Americas, Asia Pacific, Europe, Middle East, South Asia and Africa.
