= SR Technics =

Swiss independent provider of technical services in civil aviation

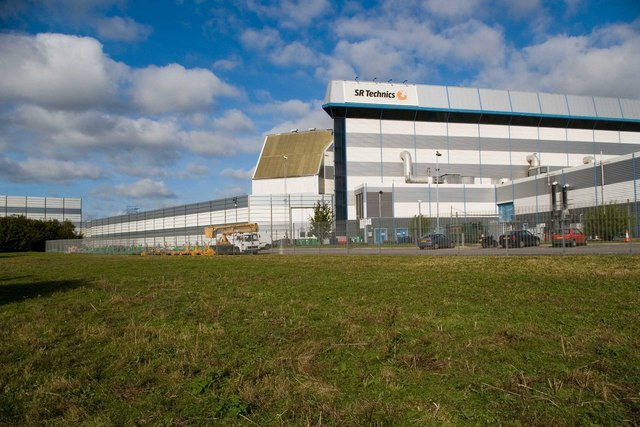
- Type: Private company
- Industry: Aircraft maintenance and repair
- Founded: 1931 (Technical Department of Swissair)
- Headquarters: Kloten, Switzerland
- Key people: Owen McClave (CEO)
- Number of employees: ca. 3,300 (2015)
- Website: www.srtechnics.com

SR Technics, headquartered at Zürich Airport in Kloten (Switzerland), is one of the world's largest independent providers of technical services in civil aviation. The company offers maintenance services for aircraft, components, and engines (Maintenance, Repair, and Overhaul (MRO)).

SR Technics has been owned since 15 July 2016 by the HNA Aviation (80%) and Mubadala Development Company (20%).

== History ==
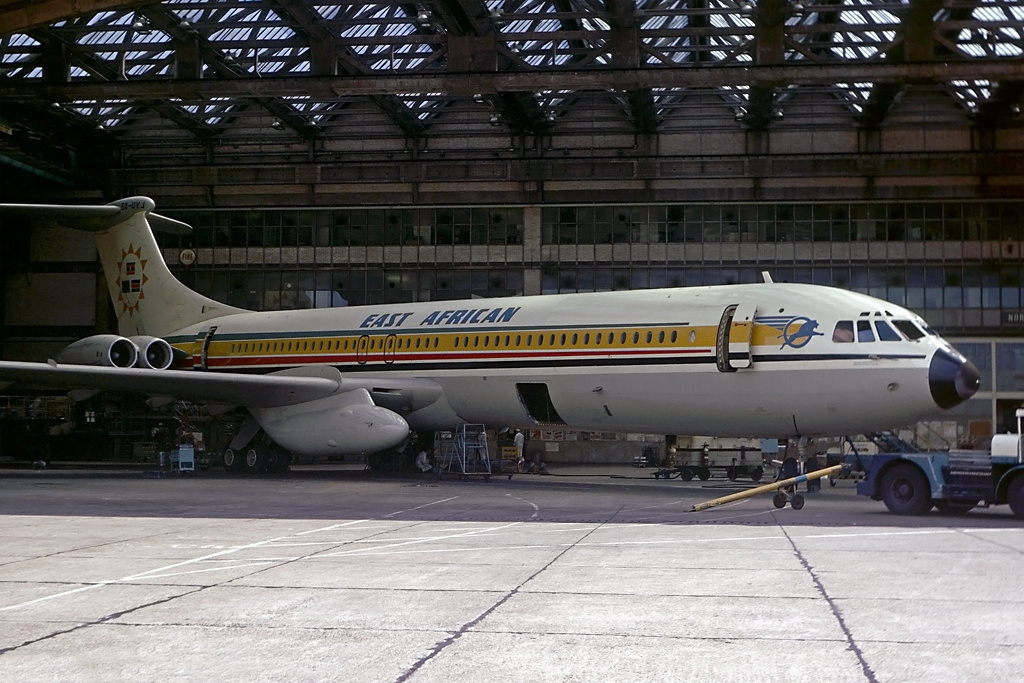
In the 1970s, the engines of the DC-9-32 of East African Airways underwent maintenance in Zürich in an underwing pod of the Vickers VC10.

SR Technics was a subsidiary of the SAirGroup. With a revenue of more than 1.4 billion CHF, it was one of the world's leading companies in the maintenance of aircraft, engines, and components.

Until the end of 1994, SR Technics was the technical department of Swissair founded in 1931 (Department 4). In 1995, the technical department became a profit center under the name "Swissair technical services".

In 1997, the Swissair Group transitioned to a holding company structure and adopted the new name SAirGroup. This holding consisted of the corporate divisions SAirLines, SAirServices, SAirLogistics, and SAirRelations.

As a result of this restructuring, Swissair technical services gained legal personality as SR Technics on 1 January 1997 within the SAirServices division.

The advancing internationalization and globalization necessitated adapting SR Technics' structures to the new circumstances. In 2000, the SR Technics Group was founded, in which SR Technics was henceforth integrated as SR Technics Switzerland. Additionally, Shannon Aerospace, Temro, SR Technics France, and SR Technics America belonged to this group. SR Technics America was in turn subdivided into SR Technics Palmdale, WASI, Flight Technics, Willis Lease Finance, and Pacific Gas Turbine.

After the collapse of the SAirGroup at the end of 2001 (grounding of aircraft), SR Technics was sold in December 2002 to various investors, a holding structure was established, and SR Technics became SR Technics Switzerland again. The main shareholders were 3i and Star Capital. The companies belonging to SR Technics, Shannon Aerospace, Temro, SR Technics France, and SR Technics America, were also sold, as were all other still healthy parts of the SAirGroup.

In 2004, FLS Industries sold its aircraft maintenance companies FLS Aerospace Ireland and FLS Aerospace UK to the SR Technics Group. At the beginning of 2005, these were renamed SR Technics Ireland Ltd. and SR Technics UK Ltd.

On 7 September 2006, the group management announced that SR Technics would be sold to a consortium from the United Arab Emirates with long-term strategic interest in the aviation industry. 92 percent of the shares went for 1.6 billion Swiss francs to the three companies Mubadala Development, Istithmar World, and Dubai Aerospace Enterprise (DAE), which are owned by the ruling families of Abu Dhabi and Dubai, respectively. The remaining 8 percent of the share capital remained in the possession of the management.

In early February 2009, the group management announced the closure of the approximately 1,100-employee site in Dublin. This was due to the loss of extensive customer orders at the Dublin site and the prospects for new orders being considered not feasible in the medium term due to the high costs of the site. In the context of the global aviation crisis, SR Technics also announced layoffs at the Zürich site in June 2009, affecting around 300 employees.

In November, SR Technics was able to conclude an extension and expansion of its contract with the low-cost carrier easyJet. The contract has a term of eleven years and a revenue volume of 1.6 billion US dollars.<ref> The contract has a term of eleven years and a revenue volume of 1.6 billion US dollars. SR Technics provides line maintenance and heavy maintenance services, as well as component maintenance and the provision of spare parts. At the same time, it was decided to open a new maintenance site on the island of Malta, where aircraft the size of an Airbus A320 or Boeing 737 can be maintained. In 2010, IL checks on easyJet fleet aircraft were already begun there in an existing hangar.

In January 2010, the group management announced the closure of the component business at the London-Stansted site. This affected approximately 340 jobs. The activities there were to be largely carried out at the headquarters at Zürich Airport thereafter.

On 1 February 2010, the previous CFO, James Stewart, additionally took over the position of CEO, succeeding Bernd Kessler, who had stepped down by mutual agreement with the board of directors.

In April 2011, SR Technics announced the opening of the VIP Completion Center, where luxury fittings are installed according to customer specifications. Seven months later, the Mubadala Aerospace MRO Network was founded, consisting of SR Technics and Abu Dhabi Aircraft Technologies (ADAT). Mubadala Development Company became the sole owner of SR Technics.

Since July 2012, all engines and components of Finnair have been maintained by SR Technics in Zürich. Finnair justified the decision by wanting to focus on its core business. The cooperation would also improve the cost efficiency of engine and component maintenance with the same quality.

In 2013, SR Technics expanded its strategic partnership with Etihad Airways through an extended ten-year contract for Integrated Component Services (ICS).

In 2014, a new component repair workshop was opened in Malaysia.

This was followed in 2017 by a twelve-year MRO contract with Philippine Airlines.

In 2015, Jeremy Remacha took over the management. In 2016, 80 percent of the shares were transferred from the Mubadala Development Company to the HNA Group. As part of this ownership change, CEO Remacha was replaced by Frank Walschot at the beginning of April 2018. In September 2019, Jean-Marc Lenz took over the management.

In February 2024, Owen McClave was appointed as the new CEO.

== Corporate group ==
The SR Technics Group includes various companies; the most important operational subsidiaries are SR Technics Switzerland AG, SR Technics UK Ltd., SR Technics Malta, and SR Technics Malaysia.

=== Key figures 2013 ===
- Number of aircraft maintained: 800
- Around 500 customers
- Infrastructure: 7 maintenance hangars with around 354,670 m² of space
- Maintenance stations: 16 maintenance stations in Europe and Asia

== Locations ==
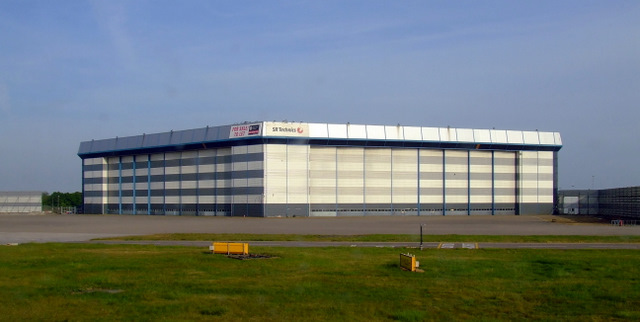
SR Technics hangar at Stansted Airport

Maintenance sites exist in Zürich, Malta International Airport, Feltham, Madrid, Palma de Mallorca, Abu Dhabi, Cork (SR Technics Airfoil Services), and Kuala Lumpur. Line maintenance stations in Basel, Belfast, Bristol, Cayenne, Edinburgh, Geneva, Glasgow, London-Stansted, London-Gatwick, Lyon, Madrid, Malta, Marseille, Paris Charles de Gaulle, and Paris Orly. Furthermore, the company maintains logistics centers in London Heathrow (London Logistics Centre), Zürich Airport (main warehouse), Abu Dhabi, Melbourne, Singapore, Geneva, Malta, Miami, and Kuala Lumpur. Sales offices are located in Zürich, London, Abu Dhabi, Sydney, Singapore, Mumbai, Shanghai, and Sunrise (United States).

=== Zürich Airport site ===
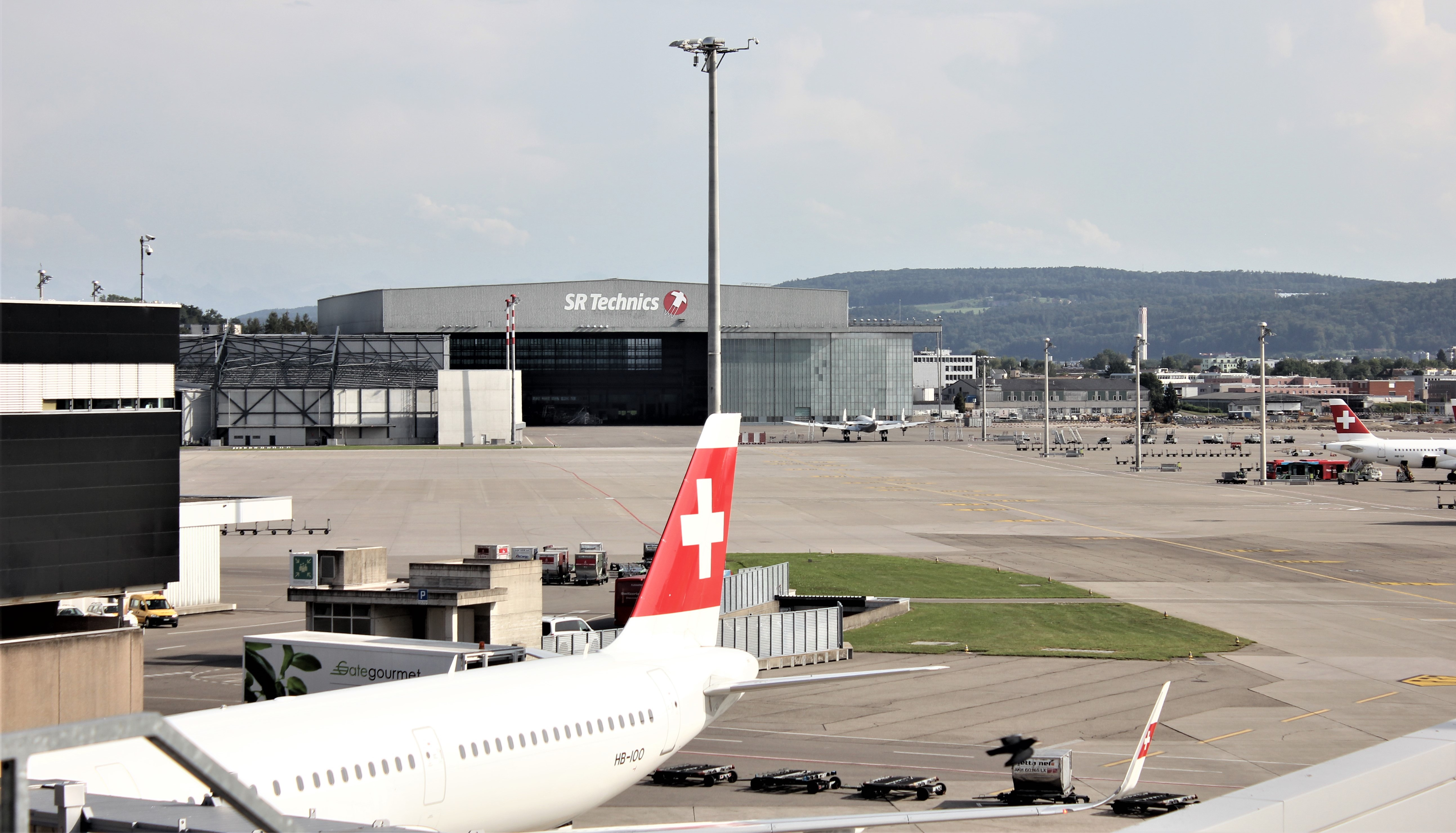
Maintenance hangar at Zürich Airport

The main site of SR Technics at Zürich Airport comprises four maintenance hangars, an engine test stand, as well as maintenance workshops and warehouses for engines and components. The site covers around 350,000 m². In 2012, around 2,400 of the 3,100 worldwide employees worked in Zürich. From the beginning of 2015 to the end of 2016, the workforce was reduced to around 2,000, and further layoffs were announced. In August 2017, the workforce in Zürich was still given as around 2,000, and the company was seeking 80 employees, mainly technicians. The company also trains around 20 apprentices annually.

=== Malta's Safi Aviation Park ===
In mid-2010, the new site at Safi Aviation Park at Malta International Airport was opened. SR Technics in Malta offers base and heavy maintenance for the Airbus A320 family. Currently, around 150 employees work at this site.

== Services ==
SR Technics' services encompass a broad portfolio. This includes individual maintenance as well as comprehensive maintenance of individual engines, components, and aircraft, and the maintenance of entire aircraft fleets. In addition to the two main sites (Zürich and Malta) with associated hangar spaces, workshops, and spare parts warehouses, SR Technics has around 16 locations.

For work on aircraft and components, SR Technics holds a number of necessary approvals and certificates from manufacturers and various aviation authorities.

SR Technics' services are based on six business areas:

Service portfolio
Combination of aircraft, component, and engine services Technical management of an aircraft fleet
Aircraft Services	VIP Aircraft Services	Component Services	Engine Services	Technical Training	Engineering Services
Line, base, and heavy maintenance Modifications Engineering Cabin modifications	VIP aircraft maintenance Cabin refurbishment Initial outfitting	Maintenance and repair of components Purchase, exchange, and leasing of components Financing Logistics	Maintenance and repair of engines Management Financing	Basic training (A, B1, B2) Aircraft type training Specialized training	Technical fleet management Continuing airworthiness Design services for cabin modifications AOG structural engineering Technical documentation/manuals

=== Approvals and certificates ===
Aircraft

- Airbus: Airbus A300-600, Airbus A310, A320 family, Airbus A330, Airbus A340, Airbus A380
- Boeing: B737 CL/NG, Boeing 747, Boeing 757, Boeing 767, Boeing 787, Boeing 777
- McDonnell Douglas: MD-11, MD-80
- Fokker: Fokker 100, Fokker 70
- Embraer: Embraer 170, Embraer 190

Engines

- CF6-50C
- CFM56-3/5A/5B/5C/7B
- Rolls-Royce RB211
- PW4000-94/100 Series
- V2500

Certificates (excerpt)

- EASA CH.145.0200 Maintenance Org, EASA CH.21J.358 Design Org, EASA CH.21G.0016 Production Org, EASA CH.MG.7005 Continuous Airworthiness Management Org
- Training Org (EASA CH.147.0009; CAAC F.147.041002; U.A.E CAR 147/11/2004)
- 14 CFR Part 145 SWRY3221 (FAA)
- Bahrain, Bangladesh, Egypt, Israel, Pakistan, Qatar, South Africa, Vietnam, Cayman Islands, Saudi Arabia, Aruba, Australia, Bermuda, Brazil, Canada, Indonesia, China, Ethiopia, Hong Kong, India, Japan, Malaysia, Mexico, Thailand, Philippines, United Arab Emirates
- ISO 9001:2008
- ISO 9110:2005
- ISO 14001:2004
- OHSAS 18001:2007

=== Aircraft maintenance ===
Aircraft type	Engine type
Airbus
A300-600	CF6-80 & PW 4000
A310-200/300	JT9D, PW 4000 and CF6-80
A318	CFM 56
A319	CFM 56, V2500
A320	CFM 56, V2500
A321	CFM 56, V2500
A330-200/300	CF6-80, PW 4000, RR TRENT
A340-200/300	CFM 56
A340-500/600	RR Trent
A380-800	RR Trent
Boeing
MD80 series	JT8D
MD11	CF6-80, PW 4000
DC10-30	CF6-50
B737-200/3/4/5/6/7/8/900	JT8D, CFM56-3/7
B747-200/3/400	JT9D, CF6-50/80, RB211, PW4000
B757-200/300	PW2040, RB211
B767-200/300	JT9D, CF6-80, PW4000
B777-200/300	RR TRENT, PW4090, GE90
Fokker
F100	RR TAY
