= Houghton Mifflin Harcourt Learning Technology =

Software publishing house

- The former Riverdeep logo
- Type: Subsidiary
- Industry: CD-ROM software Educational video game
- Founded: 1995; 31 years ago (Riverdeep Interactive Learning Limited)
- Headquarters: Boston and Dublin
- Parent: Houghton Mifflin Harcourt
- Website: hmhco.com

Houghton Mifflin Harcourt Learning Technology, originally started as Riverdeep Interactive Learning, is a publishing house for educational online and CD-ROM products based in San Francisco, Boston and Dublin, Ireland. Founded in 1995, Riverdeep was principally the creation of the Irish ex-investment banker Barry O'Callaghan. O'Callaghan was Riverdeep's CEO and controlling shareholder. Riverdeep also acquired the companies Broderbund, the Learning Company and Edmark, and became a distributor for said companies.

== History ==
In October 2002, Riverdeep became a private entity when their stock price plummeted below $2 on NASDAQ.

On September 20, 2004, Riverdeep moved its Novato office to 100 Pine Street in San Francisco.

Houghton Mifflin Harcourt officially became a publicly traded company on November 14, 2013, with common shares of stock listed on the NASDAQ exchange.

As of 2017, Houghton Mifflin Harcourt is offering the Adventure Workshop brand (originally used for titles published by or acquired by Riverdeep) as a licensing opportunity on its website.

=== Houghton Mifflin ===
On December 22, 2006, HM Rivergroup PLC announced the completed acquisition of Houghton Mifflin Holding Company, Inc. and Riverdeep Holdings, Limited. Following the completion of transactions, HM Rivergroup PLC would change its name to Houghton Mifflin Riverdeep Group PLC. Riverdeep paid $1.75 billion in cash and assumed $1.61 billion in debt from the private investment firms Thomas H. Lee Partners, Bain Capital Partners and the Blackstone Group. Tony Lucki, a former non-executive director of Riverdeep, would remain in his position as Houghton Mifflin's chief executive officer. HM Rivergroup indicated it wanted to capitalize on the "convergence of print and digital education platforms."

=== Reed Elsevier ===
In July 2007, Reed Elsevier, an information and publishing group, offloaded Harcourt US Schools Education business to Houghton Mifflin, Inc. for $4.0 billion, with $3.7 billion payable in cash and $0.3 billion payable in common stock of Houghton Mifflin, Inc.

Houghton Mifflin was privately held. Existing investors put up $23 million of equity financing to help to meet the $3.7 billion cash requirement for the purchase. Reed took a $300 million stake in Houghton Mifflin, Inc., which left it with 11.8 per cent of the common stock in the enlarged company.

The combined business became known as Houghton Mifflin Harcourt (HMH), and a new holding company, EMPG, was created. The Riverdeep name is no longer used by HMH.
