= Houghton Mifflin Harcourt =

American publisher of textbooks

Houghton Mifflin Harcourt Company
- Traded as: (as Houghton Mifflin Harcourt) Nasdaq: HMH (2013–2022) (as Houghton Mifflin) NYSE: HTN (1967–2001)
- Founded: 1832; 194 years ago (as Ticknor and Allen)
- Country of origin: United States
- Headquarters location: Boston, Massachusetts, United States
- Distribution: Self-distributed (US); Raincoast Books (Canada trade); Nelson (Canada textbooks); Melia Publishing Services (UK); Hachette Client Services (Latin America, South America, Asia and Europe); Peribo (Australia)
- Key people: Jack Lynch (president & CEO)
- Publication types: Books, software
- Imprints: Graphia, Sandpiper, HMH Books for Young Readers, John Joseph Adams Books
- Revenue: ▲$1.41 billion (2017)
- Owner: Veritas Capital
- No. of employees: 4,000+
- Official website: hmhco.com hmhbooks.com

Houghton Mifflin Harcourt Company (HMH) (/ˈhoʊtən/, HOH-tən) is an American publisher of textbooks, instructional technology materials, assessments, and reference works. The company is based in the Boston Financial District. It was formerly known as the Houghton Mifflin Company, but it changed its name following the 2007 acquisition of Harcourt Publishing. Before March 2010, it was a subsidiary of Education Media and Publishing Group Limited, an Irish-owned holding company registered in the Cayman Islands and formerly known as Riverdeep. In 2022, it was acquired by Veritas Capital, a New York–based private-equity firm.

== History ==
Houghton Mifflin Harcourt at 222 Berkeley Street, Boston, Massachusetts

In 1832, William Ticknor and John Allen purchased a bookselling business in Boston and began publishing themselves; James T. Fields joined as a partner in 1843 and would go on to publish works by Ralph Waldo Emerson, Nathaniel Hawthorne, and Henry David Thoreau. They formed a close relationship with Riverside Press, a Boston printing company owned by Henry Oscar Houghton. Houghton also founded his own publishing company, Hurd and Houghton, with partner Richard M. Hurd in 1864, with George H. Mifflin joining the partnership in 1872.

In 1878, Ticknor and Fields, now under the leadership of James R. Osgood, found itself in financial difficulties and merged its operations with Hurd and Houghton. The new partnership, named Houghton, Osgood and Company, and based in Boston's Winthrop Square, held the rights to the literary works of both publishers. When Osgood left the firm two years later, the business reemerged as Houghton, Mifflin and Company. Despite a financially successful partnership with Lawson Valentine, Houghton, Mifflin and Company retained debt it had inherited from Ticknor and Fields. In 1884, James D. Hurd, the son of Melancthon Hurd, became a partner. In 1888, the firm added James Murray Kay, Thurlow Weed Barnes, and Henry Oscar Houghton Jr.

=== Incorporation and expansion (1891–2000) ===
In 1891, the company established an educational division. The firm incorporated in 1908 and changed its name to Houghton Mifflin Company.

In 1916, Houghton Mifflin began publishing standardized tests, working with ACT creator Everett Franklin Lindquist. By 1921, the company was the fourth-largest educational publisher in the United States.

In 1961, Alfred A. Knopf published the first volume of Julia Child, Simone Beck, and Louisette Bertholle's Mastering the Art of French Cooking, after Houghton Mifflin rejected the manuscript. The book had sold close to 300,000 copies by 1966, according to Time. Houghton Mifflin's rejection of the manuscript was later dramatized in the 2009 film Julie & Julia.

In 1967, Houghton Mifflin became a publicly traded company on the New York Stock Exchange under the stock symbol "HTN."

In 1979, Houghton Mifflin acquired the catalog of Parnassus Press, a Berkeley, California small press, established in 1957 by Herman Schein, the husband of writer-illustrator Ruth Robbins. Works by authors included: Ursula K. Le Guin, Theodora Kroeber, Nicolas Sidjakov, Edward Ormondroyd, Charlotte Zolotow, Anne B. Fisher, Allen Say, Beverly Cleary, Crawford Kilian, Adrien Stoutenburg, and Sam DeWitt. In 1979, Houghton Mifflin acquired Clarion Books, the children's division of Seabury Press. In 1980, Houghton Mifflin acquired the educational publishing operations of Rand McNally.

Under Nader F. Darehshori, Houghton Mifflin acquired educational publisher McDougal Littell in 1994, for $138 million, and in 1995 acquired D.C. Heath and Company, a publisher of supplemental educational resources. In 1995, it acquired Chapters Publishing, a publisher focused on cooking, gardening, and crafts. In 1996, Houghton Mifflin created their Great Source Education Group to combine the supplemental material product lines of their school division, McDougal Littell, and Heath.

In 1998, HMH announced a sub-brand called LOGAL Software, which was to release a new line of interactive science software called Science Gateways, to support the United States curriculum.

=== Harcourt merger (2001–2007) ===
In 2001, Houghton Mifflin was acquired by French media giant Vivendi Universal for $2.2 billion, including assumed debt. Vivendi Universal already owned the British children's publisher Kingfisher, which later became an imprint of Houghton Mifflin. In 2002, facing mounting financial and legal pressures, Vivendi sold Houghton to private equity investors Thomas H. Lee Partners, Bain Capital, and Blackstone Group for $1.66 billion, including assumed debt (approximately 25% less than Vivendi had paid a year earlier).

On December 22, 2006, it was announced that Riverdeep PLC had completed its acquisition of Houghton Mifflin. The new joint enterprise would be called the Houghton Mifflin Riverdeep Group. Riverdeep paid $1.75 billion in cash and assumed $1.61 billion in debt from the private investment firms Thomas H. Lee Partners, Bain Capital, and Blackstone Group. Tony Lucki, a former non-executive director of Riverdeep, remained in his position as the company's chief executive officer until April 2009.

Houghton Mifflin sold its professional testing unit, Promissor, to Pearson plc in 2006. The company combined its remaining assessment products within Riverside Publishing, including San Francisco-based Edusoft.

Logo used from 2012 to 2024

On July 16, 2007, Houghton Mifflin Riverdeep announced that it signed a definitive agreement to acquire the Harcourt's education and trade divisions, and Greenwood-Heinemann divisions of Reed Elsevier for $4 billion. The expanded company would become Houghton Mifflin Harcourt. McDougal Littell was merged with Harcourt's Holt, Rinehart & Winston to form Holt McDougal.

In October 2007, Houghton Mifflin sold Kingfisher to Macmillan Publishers.

On December 3, 2007, Cengage Learning (formerly Thomson Learning) announced that it had agreed to acquire the assets of the Houghton Mifflin College Division for $750 million, pending regulatory approval.

=== Recent history (2008–present) ===
On November 25, 2008, Houghton Mifflin Harcourt announced a temporary freeze on the acquisition of new trade division titles, allegedly in response to the 2008 financial crisis. The publisher of the trade division resigned, apparently in protest. Many observers familiar with the publishing industry saw the move as a devastating blunder.

Harcourt Religion was sold to Our Sunday Visitor in 2009.

On July 27, 2009, the Irish Independent newspaper reported that Houghton Mifflin Harcourt's controlling shareholder EMPG was in the process of restructuring negotiations with its unsecured-debt holders that would lead to the conversion of the debt into equity. The news story reported that the unsecured debt holders would receive a 45% equity stake. As a result, the royal family of Dubai via their Istithmar World Capital investment vehicle became major stakeholders. Estimates were that EMPG would cut its debt from $7.3bn to $6.1bn. On August 15, 2009, the Financial Times reported in an interview with Houghton Mifflin Harcourt's CEO at the time, Barry O'Callaghan, that the refinancing had received approval from more than 90% of lenders. The terms included the holding company debt converting into 45% of the fully diluted common equity, an effective 25 percent relaxation of financial covenants, second lien lenders agreeing to convert their holdings into a PIK instrument, reducing annual interest costs by $100m, and a further $50m increase its working capital facility.

The company confirmed a further restructuring of Houghton Mifflin Harcourt's debts on January 13, 2010. The proposed restructuring materially impacted the shareholders of EMPG, the former holding company of Houghton Mifflin Harcourt.

On February 22, 2010, Houghton Mifflin Harcourt announced that EMPG and HMH had reached an agreement to restructure the company's finances and recapitalize its balance sheet with a substantial infusion of fresh cash from institutional investors.

The agreement, supported by 100% of HMH's creditors, highlighted a reduction in the senior debt to $3 billion from the current $5 billion, with new equity issued to the senior debt holders (including Paulson & Co. and Guggenheim Partners), conversion of the $2 billion mezzanine debt into equity and warrant, receipt of $650m of new cash from the sale of new equity. In addition to the key highlights, HMH announced its $100 million Innovation Fund to invest in the next generation of technology for the education industry.

The Irish Times reported that the investments by the then equity holders of EMPG, including HMH's CEO at the time, Barry O'Callaghan, private clients of Davy Stockbrokers, Reed Elsevier, and others of over $3.5 billion would be written down to zero. Additionally, the Irish Independent reported that following the restructuring, the investors of EMPG would have a nominal investment in Houghton Mifflin Harcourt via warrants over 5% of the company if it exceeded the $10 billion valuation placed on the company at the time of the merger between Houghton Mifflin Riverdeep and Harcourt. In addition to the warrants in HMH, the EMPG shareholders would continue to hold a stake in the international investment vehicle, EMPGI, which has investments in China, the Middle East, and elsewhere.

The Financial Times reported that no management changes were expected as part of the deal with both the CEO at the time, Barry O'Callaghan and the CFO, Michael Muldowney expected to remain in their roles. The Times reported that a new nine-member board was to be created, with the CEO as the only executive representative, one independent member, two representatives from Paulson & Co., and one director from each of Apollo, BlackRock, Guggenheim Partners, Fidelity, and Avenue Capital.

On March 10, 2010, Houghton Mifflin Harcourt announced that it had completed its re-capitalization. In addition to a new investment of $650 million of equity, the debt levels of the company were reduced by approximately 60% and the annual interest payments by over 75%. According to the Irish State Broadcaster, RTÉ, the old equity investors based in Ireland have lost all their investment. The Irish Independent reported that the old shareholders were denied a shareholders meeting to vote or discuss the restructuring. The former shareholders have been left with warrants over 5% of the company, in the case its value recovers to previous levels.

In 2012, HMH acquired the culinary and reference portfolio of John Wiley & Sons, including CliffsNotes and Webster's New World Dictionary.

HMH went public in November 2013.

In 2014, Houghton Mifflin Harcourt sponsored Curious George (TV series) on PBS Kids, replacing Chuck E. Cheese.

On May 13, 2014, HMH bought Channel One News. In 2015, Houghton Mifflin struggled to find a charity that would accept royalties for Mein Kampf by Adolf Hitler.

On February 15, 2017, John J. ("Jack") Lynch Jr., the former CEO of Renaissance Learning, was named the new CEO of Houghton Mifflin Harcourt.

In 2018, HMH sold its Steck-Vaughn adult education titles to Paxen Publishing and its Riverside test publishing subsidiary to Alpine Investments.

In 2017, it was announced that Houghton Mifflin Harcourt would be getting involved in TV production with a planned 2019 Netflix series that will revive the Carmen Sandiego franchise.

In April 2023, HMH acquired NWEA, a not-for-profit academic assessment company.

On March 29, 2021, The Wall Street Journal reported that HarperCollins, a division of American mass media and publishing company News Corp, had reached a deal to buy HMH Books & Media for US$349 million. The sale includes HMH's trade publishing division (later rebranded under the Mariner Books imprint) and computer video game franchises, such as Carmen Sandiego and The Oregon Trail. The deal would enable HMH to pay down its debt, allowing it to further its digital-first strategy in educational publishing. The deal was completed on May 10.

==== Acquisition by Veritas Capital ====
On February 22, 2022, a tender offer was announced by Veritas Capital to acquire HMH for $21 per share, or about $2.8 billion. The tender deadline was originally April 1, before being extended to April 6 on March 29. Before the tender date, there were over 36,000 contracts traded for the June 17 $22.5 strike price call options. Many investors purchased call options based on numerous reports from institutional investors with large stakes in the company, claiming that the $21 per share offer was undervaluing the company. On April 6, 57% of $HMHC shares were put up for tender, leading to the tender offer going through and HMH going private. Once the sale was completed, the stock of Houghton Mifflin Harcourt was delisted from Nasdaq.

As of November 2026, HMH’s English language arts programs Into Reading and Into Literature were used in two-thirds of New York City’s school districts. The New York City Department of Education paid HMH more than $20 million in fiscal year 2026.

== Leadership changes ==
On September 22, 2016, Zecher resigned from HMH and was replaced by Interim CEO and Board Member L. Gordon Crovitz. Crovitz is a former publisher of the Wall Street Journal. On February 15, 2017, John J. "Jack" Lynch Jr., the former CEO of Renaissance Learning, was named the new CEO of HMH.

Lynch brought former employee Jim O'Neill back to the company to lead the core division as GM and EVP.

== Catalog ==
HMH is also formerly home to media brands like Carmen Sandiego and The Oregon Trail; and brands including The Whole30; The Best American Series; The American Heritage and Webster's New World Dictionaries; Better Homes and Gardens; How to Cook Everything; the Peterson Field Guides; CliffsNotes; and many children's books, including the Curious George series and The Little Prince; as well as publishing the works of J. R. R. Tolkien for United States distribution.

Some other notable books include:

- The Handmaid's Tale, Margaret Atwood (1987) (E-book version)

== Houghton Mifflin Interactive ==
Houghton Mifflin Interactive was a wholly owned subsidiary of Houghton Mifflin Company that published titles including Inventor Labs.

== See also ==
- Educational publishing companies
- Books in the United States
- McGraw-Hill Education
- Pearson Education
