= EMPG =

Education Media and Publishing Group
- Type: Private
- Industry: Education
- Founded: 2007; 19 years ago

Education Media and Publishing Group, more commonly known as EMPG, is a holding company registered in the Cayman Islands with no operating subsidiaries. It also has a minority interest in an affiliate that focuses on markets outside the US called EMPGI. It was the effective successor to the Ireland-based Riverdeep company. It collapsed during the post-2008 Irish economic downturn after the 2008 financial crisis. Prior to March 2010, EMPG owned the legacy Riverdeep and Houghton Mifflin Harcourt businesses, which it acquired in 2006 and 2007, respectively.

== Riverdeep's acquisition of Houghton Mifflin ==
On 22 December 2006, it was announced that Riverdeep PLC had completed its acquisition of Houghton Mifflin. The new joint enterprise would be called the Houghton Mifflin Riverdeep Group plc, a company based in Ireland. Riverdeep paid $1.75 billion in cash for the equity owed the private investment firms Thomas H. Lee Partners, Bain Capital and The Blackstone Group and assumed $1.61 billion in debt. Tony Lucki, a former non-executive director of Riverdeep, remained in his position as Houghton Mifflin's chief executive officer.

== The merger with Harcourt and founding of EMPG ==
On 16 July 2007 Houghton Mifflin Riverdeep announced that it signed a definitive agreement to acquire the Harcourt Education, Harcourt Trade and Greenwood-Heinemann divisions of Reed Elsevier for $4 billion. The expanded company would become Houghton Mifflin Harcourt. The holding company structure of Houghton Mifflin Riverdeep plc was re-organised with a new holding company based in the Cayman Islands. This company was called Education Media and Publishing Group, EMPG for short.

At the time of the formation of HMH Lucki said "Together, we will be better positioned to meet the changing needs of educators and students in a wider range of subjects, states and school districts".

On 27 November 2008, President Jeremy Dickens told the New York Times that the company had $7bn of debt, which cost the company $500m per annum to service. The money to fund the 2006 Houghton Mifflin and 2007 Reed Elsevier acquisitions was borrowed, and in retrospect Education Media and Publishing Group (Riverdeep) probably overpaid for both companies.

In May 2008, Cengage Learning (formerly Thomson Learning) acquired the assets of the Houghton Mifflin College Division for $750 million.

The combined business was led by Tony Lucki, who had more than thirty years of publishing experience, until his replacement in April 2009 by Barry O'Callaghan.

== Financial reorganization ==
=== Downgrades in January 2009 ===
In January 2009 the two big credit rating services, Moody's Investor Services and Standard & Poor's, reduced the rating of EMPG and warned that default on its debt was increasingly likely. On 10 April 2009 Moody's downgraded Houghton Mifflin Harcourt down to Caa3 from Caa1. In August 2009, EMPG announced that it had substantially reduced its debt, relaxed covenants and received incremental working capital facilities.

In January 2009, Reed Elsevier dropped its valuation of their 11.8% stake in EMPG to just €15m. This values the group at around 5% of its original claimed worth, leaving Chairman Barry O'Callaghan with few options now that S&P rates the group CCC.

=== Restructuring in August 2009 ===
On 27 July 2009, the Irish Independent newspaper reported that EMPG was in the process of a re-structuring negotiations with its unsecured-debt holders that would lead to the conversion of the debt into equity. The news story reported that the unsecured debt holders would receive a 45% equity stake. Dubai's royal family to buy up stake in EMPG. The article estimates that post deal, EMPG would cut its debt from $7.3bn to $6.1bn. On 15 August 2009, the Financial Times newspaper reported in an interview with Houghton Mifflin Harcourt's CEO, Barry O'Callaghan, that the refinancing had received approval of more than 90% of lenders. The terms included the holding company debt converting into 45% of the fully diluted common equity, an effective 25 per cent relaxation of financial covenants, second lien lenders agreeing to convert their holdings into a PIK instrument, reducing annual interest costs by $100m, and a further $50m increase its working capital facility. Following the announcement of the debt restructuring, the President of EMPG, Jeremy Dickens, previously a lawyer at Weil, Gotshal & Manges, stepped down as President of EMPG.

On 12 September 2009, the Irish Independent reported that a circular was posted to shareholders of EMPG with details of the restructuring, including an update on financial performance and a new management incentive plan. In the article it stated that EMPG's earnings before interest, tax, depreciation and amortisation (EBITDA) rose 18pc in 2008 to $750m. Although the article indicated that the outlook for 2009 is uncertain, it highlights that Houghton Mifflin Harcourt has won a 52% market share in all new adoptions in the first half of 2009.

=== Rumored shareholder wipe-out ===
On 13 January 2010, Irish politician George Lee, the opposition party, Fine Gael's TD for Dublin South, told journalists that EMPG has failed with equity investors likely to be wipe-out and the Irish taxpayer was exposed since the nationalised bank, Anglo Irish Bank has lent money to the shareholders of EMPG.

Commented Lee

It has been reported to me that the education materials company Houghton Mifflin Harcourt has failed, and that a number of Irish equity investors have lost significant sums of money as a result. Many of these investors were funded through large loans from Anglo Irish Bank, which is now wholly owned by Irish taxpayers.

As a company, Houghton Mifflin Harcourt was a highly leveraged operation and had very significant banking commitments. I understand that the remaining US business is to be transferred to its bond holders. However, it appears that its Irish equity investors will lose all of their investment as a result of this failure. This will have repercussions for Anglo Irish Bank, and possibly other Irish banks, and therefore the Irish taxpayer.

This incident adds further weight to Fine Gael's calls for an urgent investigation into the Irish banking crisis. Fuller details of the goings-on within Anglo Irish Bank's risky lending practices are still emerging, and this development with Houghton Mifflin Harcourt sheds further light. However, only a full, forensic investigation into the crisis will ensure that it never happens again.

EMPG confirmed that it was in advanced negotiations with its lenders about a comprehensive restructuring, that could see a 70% reduction in the current debt levels that would lead to Paulson & Co., a hedge fund, becoming the largest shareholder. According to the Financial Times, second lien investors had not yet approved the plan which would see half of the $5bn of first-lien debt convert into circa 90% of the equity of Houghton Mifflin Harcourt, with the remaining equity for the $2bn second lien investors and the old EMPG shareholders. The Financial Times story indicated that Houghton Mifflin Harcourt was considering a pre-packaged bankruptcy if the negotiations with lenders were not approved.

According to the Irish Times, investors of Davy Stockbrokers had $475m of equity in EMPG. In contrast to the statement of George Lee that Irish taxpayers were exposed, an Anglo Irish Bank spokesperson was reported by the Irish Times to state that it did not have a "big exposure" to EMPG. However, the spokesperson did not comment on whether it has exposure to individuals that have exposure to EMPG.

Interviewed on Irish State broadcaster, RTÉ, Barry O'Callaghan, chairman on EMPG and CEO of Houghton Mifflin Harcourt, confirmed that Irish investors as well as he himself were facing huge losses. He stated that "no-one has lost more than me". According to the Irish Independent, Barry O'Callaghan is a large personal customer of Anglo Irish Bank. The article stated that Barry O'Callaghan may be forced to step down once the restructuring package was agreed. This contrasted with his interview with the Financial Times where he insisted that he would continue to run the business.

=== Recapitalization and restructuring ===
On 22 February 2010, Houghton Mifflin Harcourt announced that EMPG and HMH had reached an agreement to restructure the finances of the company and recapitalise its balance sheet with a substantial fresh cash investment by institutional investors.

The agreement, supported by 100% of HMH's creditors, closed on 9 March 2010. Highlights of the agreement included a reduction in the senior debt to $3 billion from the current $5 billion, with new equity issued to the senior debt holders (including Paulson & Co., Guggenheim Partners), conversion of the $2 billion mezzanine debt into equity and warrant, receipt of $650m of new cash from the sale of new equity. In addition to the key highlights, HMH formed a new $100m Innovation Fund to invest in the next generation of technology for the education industry.

According to the Irish Times the investments by the current equity holders of EMPG, including HMH's CEO, Barry O'Callaghan, private clients of Davy Stockbrokers, Reed Elsevier, Istithmar and others, would see their investment of over $3.5 billion written down to zero. Following the restructuring, the investors of EMPG retained a nominal investment in Houghton Mifflin Harcourt via warrants over 5% of the company if it exceeded the $10 billion valuation placed on the company at the time of the merger between Houghton Mifflin Riverdeep and Harcourt. In addition to the warrants in HMH, the EMPG shareholders continue to own a stake in the international investment vehicle, EMPGI which has stakes in China, the Middle East and elsewhere.

After the recapitalization, both the CEO, Barry O'Callaghan and the CFO, Michael Muldowney, remained in their roles. A new nine-member board was created with the CEO the only executive representative, one independent, two representative of Paulson & Co., and one director from each of Apollo Management, BlackRock, Guggenheim Partners, Fidelity Investments, and Avenue Capital.

On 10 March 2010, Houghton Mifflin Harcourt announced that it had completed its re-capitalization. In addition to a new investment of $650 million of equity, the debt levels of the company were reduced by approximately 60% and the annual interest payments by over 75%. According to the Irish State Broadcaster, RTÉ, the old equity investors based in Ireland has lost all their investment. The Irish Independent reported that the old shareholders were denied a shareholders meeting to vote on discuss the restructuring. The former shareholders have been left with warrants over 5% of the company, in the case its value recovers to previous levels.
