= Inventor Labs =

CD-ROM software from Houghton Mifflin Interactive and Red Hill Studios

- Developers: Houghton Mifflin Interactive; Red Hill Studios
- Release: 1996
- Operating system: Macintosh; Windows

Inventor Labs is a CD-ROM software from Houghton Mifflin Interactive and Red Hill Studios.

== Summary ==
The CD has a virtual tour through three of the most famous science labs ever: the workshops of Thomas Edison, Alexander Graham Bell, and James Watt.

== Development ==
Inventor Labs was developed by Red Hill Studios, a company founded in 1991.

== Reception ==
CNET said "Combining an interactive look at science history with an eye to the future, this virtual tour will be as much fun for kids as their first magnifying glass". New York Daily News gave Inventor Labs a score of 2 out of 4.

Publishers Weekly said "Though the science here is solid, kids will likely seek out something more entertaining".

Inventor Labs won a Gold Invision Award for Best Young Adult Title. It was also a finalist in the Best Use of Visual Arts in Multimedia category in the 1997 CODiE Awards.
