= Nader Darehshori =

Iranian-American businessman

Nader Farhang Darehshori
- Born: 15 December 1936 (age 88); Shiraz, Iran
- Education: University of Wisconsin

Nader Farhang Darehshori (born in Shiraz, Iran 15 December 1936) is Chairman, President, CEO, and Co-Founder of Aptius Education, Inc. He is a director at State Street Corporation and was a director of Aviva USA Corporation. He is a trustee of Wellesley College, the Dana–Farber Cancer Institute, and the Tanenbaum Center for Interreligious Understanding. He is on the EdNET Advisory Board and the Massachusetts Business Roundtable Board.

Darehshori came to the United States in 1961; in 1966 received a B.A. from the University of Wisconsin. The same year began to work in Houghton Mifflin as a Salesperson. He was President, Chairman, and CEO of Houghton Mifflin from 1990 to 2000. He received an honorary Doctor of Commercial Science degree from Suffolk University in 1992. He was the Director, Chairman, and Co-Founder of Cambium Learning, Inc. from 2004 to 2007 and remained on the board.
