= Dubai World =

Government owned company

Dubai World دبي العالمية
- Type: Government owned
- Industry: Diversified investments
- Founded: 2 July 1969
- Headquarters: Dubai, United Arab Emirates
- Area served: 30 cities in 12 countries
- Key people: Ahmed bin Saeed Al Maktoum, Chairman; Jamal Majid Bin Thaniah, CEO
- Revenue: ▲US$18 billion (2008)
- Operating income: ▲US$1.4 billion (2008)
- Net income: ▲US$1.17 billion (2008)
- Number of employees: 5000+
- Parent: Dubai Inc.
- Subsidiaries: Dubai Ports World; Jafza; Dubai Drydocks; Maritime City; Tamweel; Tejari; Leisurecorp; Istithmar World; Nakheel Properties; DUTech; Island Global Yachting

Dubai World (Arabic: دبي العالمية) is a state-owned investment company that manages and supervises a portfolio of businesses and projects for the Government of Dubai across a wide range of industry segments and projects that promote Dubai as a hub for commerce and trading. As a subsidiary of Dubai Inc., it is the emirate's flag bearer in global investments and has a central role in the direction of Dubai's economy. Assets include DP World, which caused considerable controversy when trying to take over six US ports, its property arm, Nakheel, which built The Palm Islands and The World developments, and Istithmar World, its investment company. Ahmed bin Saeed Al Maktoum chairs it.

== History ==
Dubai World was established under a decree ratified on 2 March 2006 by Sheikh Mohammed bin Rashid Al Maktoum, Ruler of Dubai. He is also the majority stakeholder in Dubai World.

On 2 July 2006, it was launched as a holding company with more than 50,000 employees in over 100 global cities. The group now has extensive real estate investments in the United States, the United Kingdom and South Africa. Dubai World made headlines in March 2008 after its chairman, Sultan Ahmed bin Sulayem, threatened to take the fund's money out of Europe. Dubai World's threats came shortly after the European Union attempted to lay out "a set of principles for transparency, predictability and accountability" for sovereign wealth funds.

On 26 November 2009, Dubai World proposed to delay repayment of its debt, which raised the risk of the largest government default since the Argentine debt restructuring in 2001. Dubai World, the investment vehicle for the emirate, asked to delay for six months payment on $26 billion of debt. The extent of the debt rattled many markets causing many indices to drop; including oil prices. U.S. stocks fell sharply but rebounded from their lows as investors concluded that the damage might be contained. The Dow Jones industrial average lost about 155 points, or roughly 1.5 percent, in a shortened trading day, and other stock averages also sank. Oil prices plunged as much as 7 percent before recovering some ground later in the day.

On 12 December 2010, Dubai named Sheikh Ahmed bin Saeed Al Maktoum, head of the Emirates airline and uncle of the state's ruler, as chairman of Dubai World in a board revamp a year after the company said it would halt loan repayments, roiling markets. He replaced Sultan Ahmed bin Sulayem.

Andrew (Andy) Watson, has been serving as the managing director at Dubai World since July 2011.

On 29 January 2013, Drydocks World signed a memorandum of understanding for a US$2.5 billion joint venture partnership with Indonesia to develop a maritime cluster in the Asian country that would serve, among others, the petrochemicals industry.

In March 2022, its subsidiary DP World's P&O Ferries division sacked 800 longstanding crewmembers and caused backlash in the United Kingdom, potentially putting the tax status of DP World's London and Southampton free ports at risk.

== 2009 debt standstill ==
During the Great Recession, Dubai's real estate market declined after a six-year boom. On 25 November 2009, the Dubai government announced that the company "intends to ask all providers of financing to Dubai World to 'standstill' and extend maturities until at least 30 May 2010". The company had laid off 10,500 employees worldwide. At that time, Dubai World had debts of $59-billion, accounting for nearly three-quarters of the emirate's US$80-billion debt. This includes a US$3.5-billion loan which the company was unable to repay by its December deadline.

In response to the government announced moratorium of Dubai World's debts, both Moody's and Standard & Poor's Investors Services heavily downgraded the debt of various Dubai government-related entities with interests in property, utilities, commercial operations and commodities trading. In Moody's case, the downgrade meant that the affected agencies lost their investment grade status.

Concerns over the fallout from Dubai's debt problems contributed to the main European stock indexes falling over 3% on 26 November. This was followed by drops in Asian stocks on 27 November. However the European stock markets rebounded as investors' fears subsequently subsided as they decided the estimated debt was not big enough to trigger a systemic failure in global financial markets. "For now, the market is taking the view that the Dubai debt issue may be a storm rather than a hurricane," said Jane Foley, a research director at Forex.com in London. The American markets were closed on 26 November but American stocks fell on the afternoon of 27 November as similar fears rattled Wall Street in a thinly-traded half-day session. The Dow Jones Industrial Average (INDU) fell 155 points, or 1.5%, after closing 25 November at a 13-month high. The Dow had lost 233 points in the morning. Also, concerns of the crisis led to a sharp rally in the U.S. dollar and Japanese Yen against most other world currencies as these currencies had been perceived as "safe haven" currencies during times of uncertainty.

An unnamed senior official told news agencies on 28 November that Abu Dhabi, the wealthy capital of the United Arab Emirates, would "pick and choose" how to assist Dubai World. "We will look at Dubai's commitments and approach them on a case-by-case basis," the official told the Reuters news agency by telephone, adding: "It does not mean that Abu Dhabi will underwrite all of their debts." Meanwhile, India's central bank governor said an assessment of the impact of Dubai's debt problems was needed before deciding on a response. "We should not react to instant news like this. One lesson of the crisis is that we must study the developments, and I think we must measure the extent of the problem there and how it impacts India," Duvvuri Subbarao said in Hyderabad, India.

A public statement on 30 November 2009, of the Dubai Finance Department Director-General, that the Dubai World debts are "not guaranteed by the government" appears to correctly reflect the legal position, as the Dubai Government were not required by the lenders, and nor did they provide, any contractual guarantees in respect of the Dubai World debt:

Officials in the United Arab Emirates tried on 1 December to calm investors and the public over the Dubai World debt crisis, and the company itself said it was seeking to renegotiate only the $26 billion in obligations held by its troubled real estate developer, Nakheel. It also said that it had hired Moelis & Company, the investment boutique headed by Ken Moelis, a former UBS banker, to be its adviser. Rothschild is also advising Dubai World. Shares in Dubai and Abu Dhabi were down for a second day, with both key indexes declining about 6%. On 30 November, shares dropped in Dubai and Abu Dhabi by 7.3% and 8.3%, respectively.

On 14 December 2009 the Dubai government received $10 billion in surprise aid from Abu Dhabi for debt-laden Dubai World, which said it would use $4.1 billion of it to repay its Nakheel unit's Islamic bond maturing on the same day.

As of 24 January 2010 Dubai World's property assets have exceeded US$120 billion, so that it could cover its debt of US$57 billion.

=== Debt deal ===
Dubai World on 20 May 2010 said that it had reached an agreement "in principle" with most of its bank lenders to restructure debt worth $23.5bn (£16.4bn). It would be left with debts of $14.4bn after the restructuring. But the deal must still be approved by other banks that were not involved in the negotiations. The terms of the restructuring, include converting $8.9bn of government debt into equity. The government of Dubai and Dubai World had tabled this offer to bank lenders in March 2010 after three months of negotiations.

== Managed companies ==
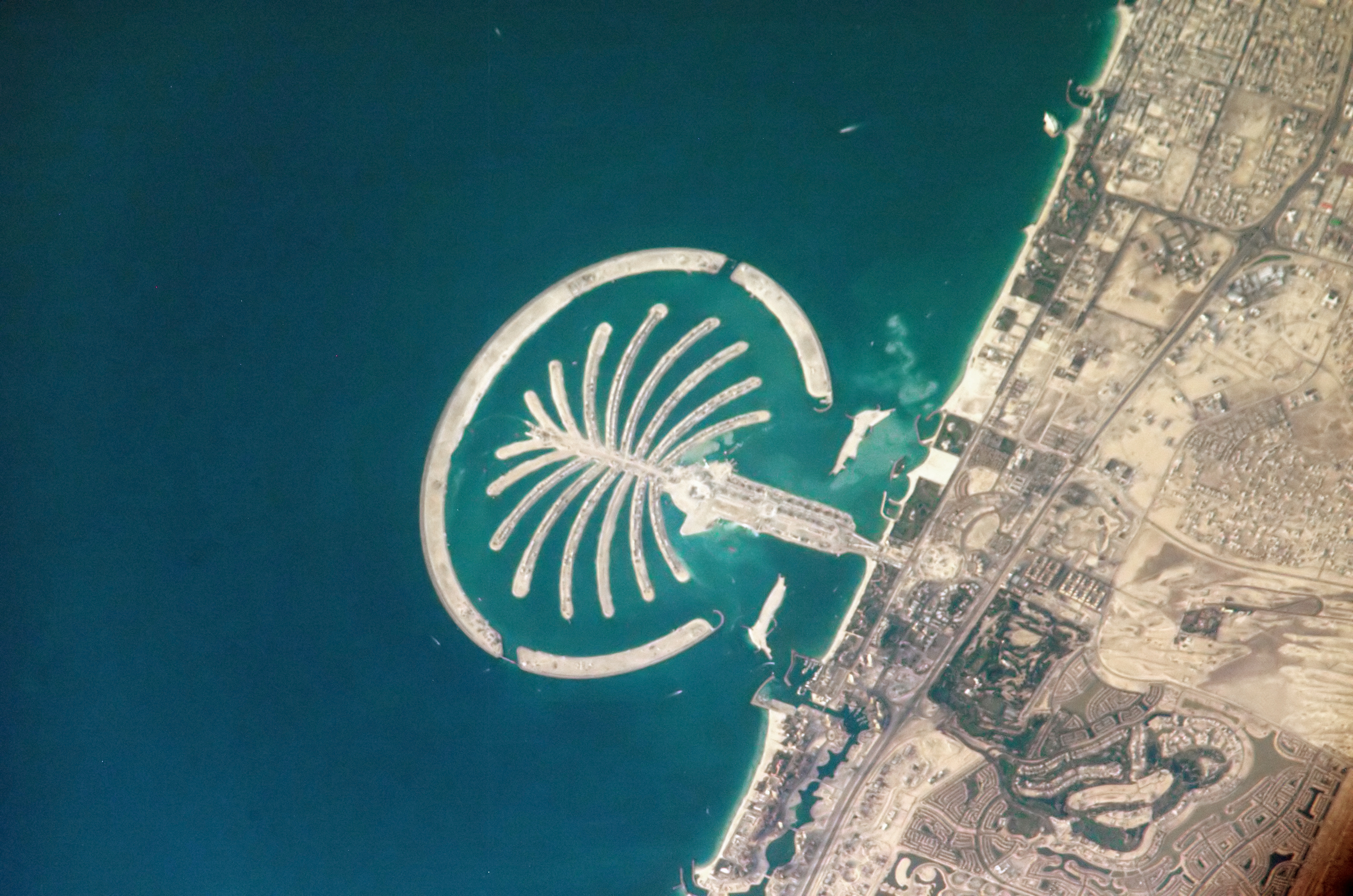
Nakheel's man-made island Palm Jumeirah seen from the International Space Station in 2005.

- DP World
- Dubai Drydocks
- Dubai Maritime City
- Economic Zones World, the parent company of Jebel Ali Free Zone
- Infinity World Development
- Istithmar World
- Nakheel Properties
