= Leisurecorp =

Emirati investment company

- Type: Investment company (Government-owned)
- Industry: Sports/Leisure Investments
- Founded: 2006
- Headquarters: Dubai, United Arab Emirates
- Area served: Global
- Products: Investment
- Parent: Dubai World
- Website: www.leisurecorp.com

Leisurecorp, formerly Istithmar Leisure, is a subsidiary of Dubai World, established in 2006, that invests in sports and leisure facilities, with golf being a particular focus.

== Sites ==
Among the sites owned by Leisurecorp are PGA European Tour venues Pearl Valley Golf Estates in South Africa, and Jumeirah Golf Estates in Dubai. It bought the Turnberry Resort in Scotland in October 2008, which hosted the 2009 Open Championship, and sold it to Donald Trump in April 2014. Leisurecorp also has major shareholdings in Island Global Yachting, Troon Golf, GPS Industries, and Snowmass, Colorado.

== History ==
In November 2007, Leisurecorp agreed a major partnership deal with the PGA European Tour. The highlight of the deal saw the creation of the season ending Dubai World Championship, held annually on the Earth Course at Jumeirah Golf Estates. The US$10 million prize fund makes it the world's richest golf tournament. In addition, the European Tour Order of Merit was rebranded as the Race to Dubai, with an additional US$10 million bonus fund, and the top 60 players qualifying for the season finale.

The PGA European Tour's International Headquarters were also moved to Jumeirah Golf Estates in 2009, and from the 2010 season, the European Tour schedule will open and close at Leisurecorp venues, starting with the South African Open at Pearl Valley and finishing with the Dubai World Championship. There are also plans for the European Open, a regular tour event, to be moved and make Turnberry its permanent home, although there are reports that this could affect the venues place on the Open Championship rota.

Having developed this close relationship with the PGA European Tour, Leisurecorp hopes that in the future, it may be able to stage the Ryder Cup in Dubai.
