= Dubai Drydocks =

Shipyard in Dubai, UAE

Coordinates: 25°14′59.88″N 55°16′07.89″E

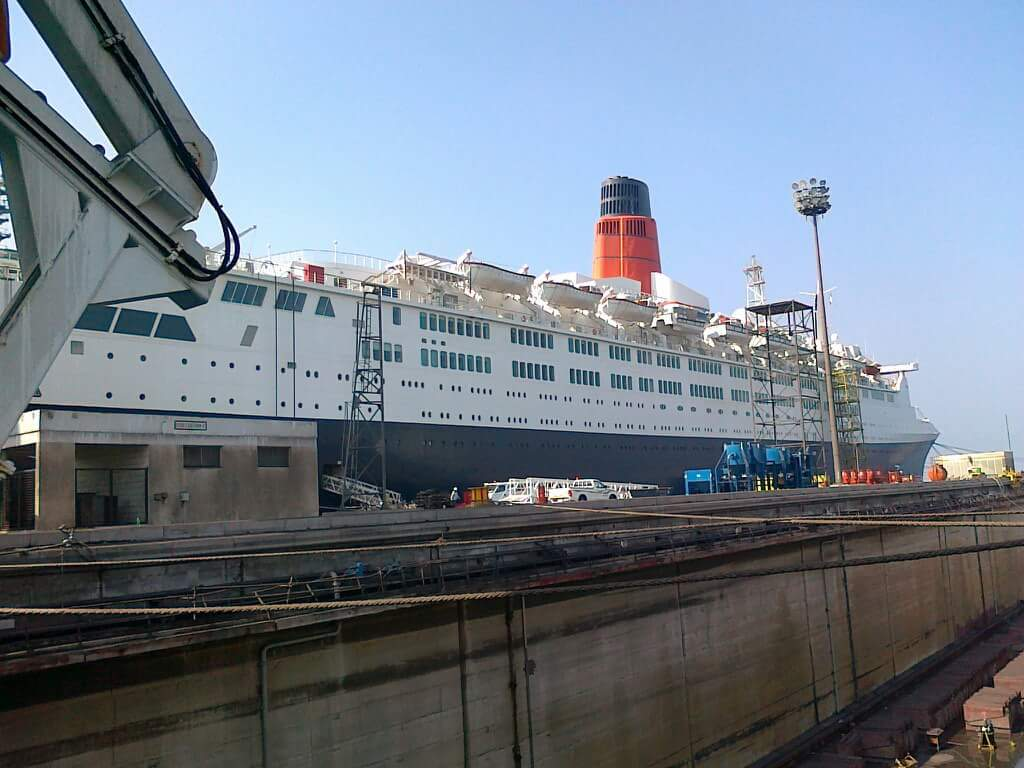
MS Queen Elizabeth 2

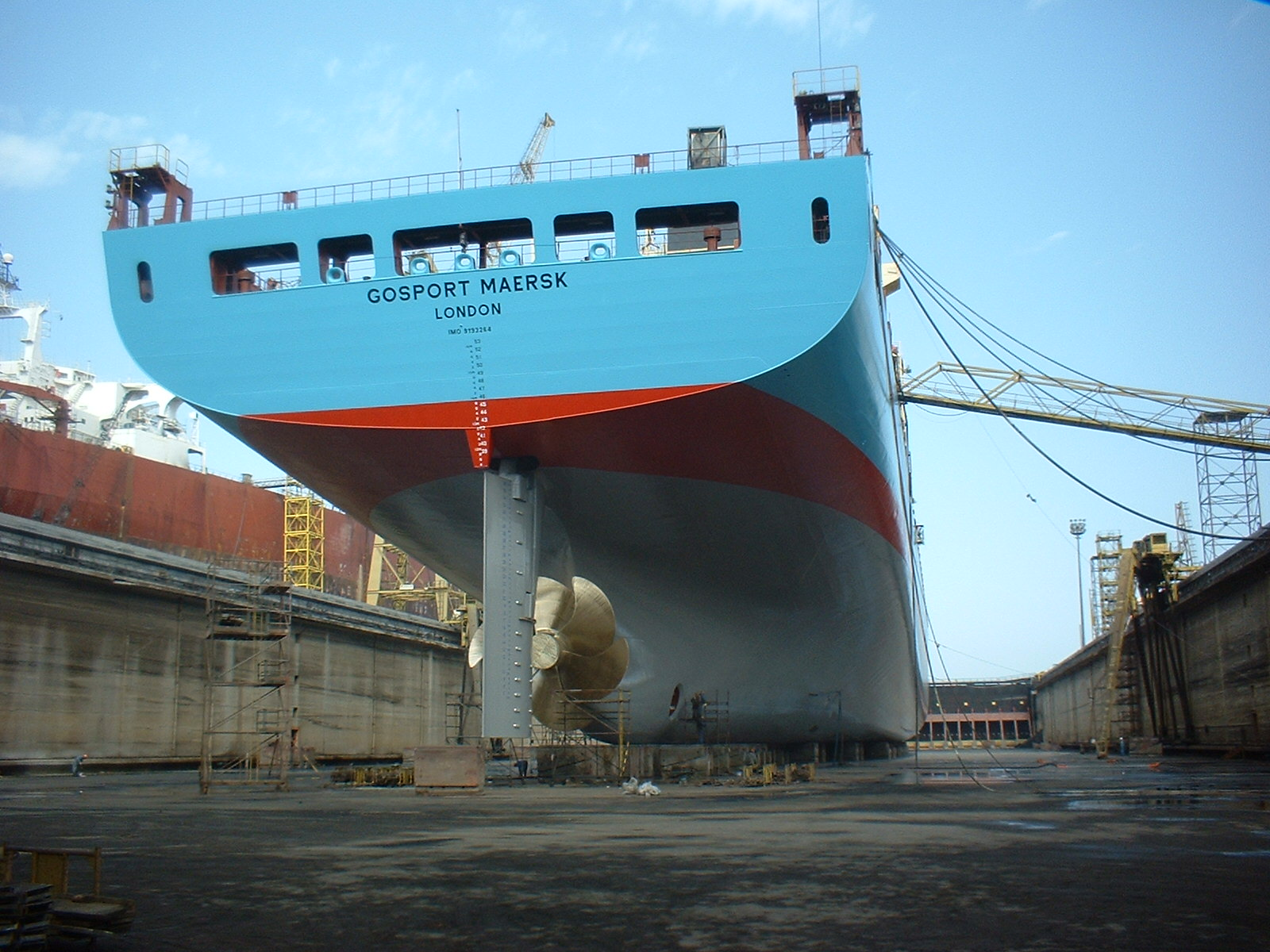
A ship in Dubai Drydocks

Dubai Drydocks is a dry docks facility adjacent to Port Rashid in Dubai, United Arab Emirates. The idea for Dubai Drydocks began in 1971. After feasibility studies and construction, the facility opened in 1983. It is the only large dry docks facility in the Persian Gulf. Since it opened, the yard has repaired over 6000 vessels with a combined tonnage of 500 million tons. The Dubai Drydocks have been building new ships since 1994 and have since completed over 70 projects. The dry dock also contains the Middle East's largest floating crane. Dubai Drydocks is adjacent to Dubai Maritime City and Port Rashid (Mina Rashid).

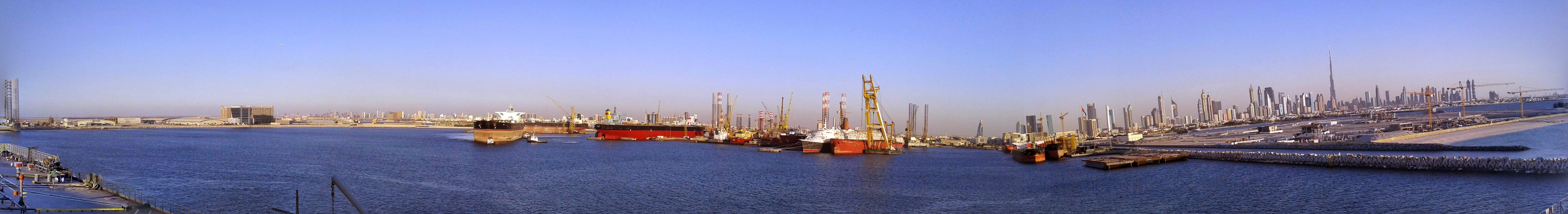
Dubai Drydocks

There was a massive accident in 2002. 29 workers died after the water started to enter the drydocks when the locks somehow failed.
