= Istithmar World =

Investment firm based in Dubai, UAE

- Type: Subsidiary
- Industry: Finance and Insurance
- Founded: Dubai, UAE (2003)
- Headquarters: Dubai, Dubai, UAE
- Area served: UAE; China; United States
- Key people: Ahmed bin Saeed Al Maktoum, Chairman
- Products: Financial services
- Parent: Dubai World
- Website: www.istithmarworld.com www.istithmar.world

Istithmar World (Arabic: استثمار, romanized: istithmar; for "investment" (English) is an investment firm that is based in Dubai, United Arab Emirates (UAE). This company is a state-run business owned by Dubai World, a Dubai government-owned company, and was established in 2003. Originally known as "Istithmar," the company was renamed as "Istithmar World" in 2008.

Istithmar World, which was created in 2003 as the investment firm of Dubai World specializes in private equity and alternative investment opportunities globally. In the five years since its inception, Istithmar World has built a portfolio of investments in markets ranging from North America and Europe to Asia and the Middle East, and across a variety of sectors, including consumer, industrial, financial services and real estate.

An analysis of Istithmar's investment portfolio which included the investment of $3.8 billion with an associated $14 billion of debt, has not performed positively. In a number of cases, Istithmar has lost control of assets or sold at a loss. As a subsidiary of Dubai World, the company has been mentioned in numerous press reports related to the high debt levels of its parent. Since late 2009, the company has seen numerous departures of high-profile executives.

== Divisions ==
Headquartered in Dubai, UAE, with offices in Shanghai, China and New York City, United States, Istithmar World invests through its three separately-managed divisions: Istithmar World Capital, Istithmar World Aviation and Istithmar World Ventures.

- Istithmar World Capital is the private equity and alternative investment arm of Istithmar World. Since inception, IWC has made over 35 investments.
- Istithmar World Aviation invests in fast-growing sectors of the aviation and aerospace industry, including airlines, manufacturing, engineering and financing.
- Istithmar World Ventures is a venture capital platform that provides promising start-ups and greenfield ventures with the necessary financial and managerial resources.

== Board and management ==
The Board of Istithmar is led by the Chairman, Sheikh Ahmed bin Saeed Al Maktoum. Other Board Members include Mohammad Ibrahim Al Shaibani (Director General of the Dubai Ruler's Court), Farouk Bin Hamad Al Thani (Chairman, Belwan Al Thani Group) Abdul Rahman Saleh Al Saleh (Director General of the Finance Department), Hamad Mubarak Bu Amim (Director General of the Dubai Chamber of Commerce and Industry), Sa’adi Abdul Rahim Hassan Al Rais and Sun Yong Chang.

Each of the divisions had its own management teams until a re-organisation was enacted at the end of 2009 and in early 2010. Istithmar World Capital saw the departure of its co-CIOs, John Amato and Felix Herlihy, who had joined the firm in 2006, who announced their departure in September 2009. On 20 January 2010, the CEO of Istithmar World Capital, David Jackson announced that he would be leaving the firm. Andy Watson, who had been promoted from CIO of Nakheel to CIO of Istithmar became acting CEO.

In July 2012, the board of Istithmar was reshuffled by chairman Sultan Ahmed Bin Sulayem, before being entirely replaced a few hours later, on the instructions of Dubai's ruler, Sheikh Mohammed bin Rashid Al Maktoum, by the board of Dubai World.

== Dubai related financial concerns ==
On 26 November 2009, the Wall Street Journal reported that Dubai World was seeking to sign a 6-month debt standstill agreement with its creditors. In response to the announcement Moody's and Standard & Poor's downgraded the debt of various Dubai government-related entities, with Moody's downgrading the affected agencies to sub-investment grade status. The effect of the announcement was widespread fear in the global financial markets with a negative impact of equities markets around the world and a significant increase in the cost of insuring debt issued by Dubai related entities.

On 30 November 2009, Dubai World made a statement in an attempt to counter rumours and mis-understanding. In the statement, Dubai World indicated that Istithmar would not be part of the proposed restructuring process. Instead the restructuring process would focus on several property related subsidiaries, most notably Nakheel. The statement noted that the total debt subject to the proposed restructuring was circa $26 billion.

== Investment portfolio ==
Istithmar World Capital states on its website that it has deployed $3.5 billion of capital in 35 investments across the globe. In an interview with the Financial Times in March 2009, the then CEO, David Jackson indicated that total assets under management by Istithmar had declined due to the 2008 financial crisis and were $9 billion by the end of 2008. In the article, Jackson indicated that Istithmar had delivered returns of approximately 10% since its foundation. According to The Times in an article on 7 February 2010, Istithmar invested a total of $3.8 billion of its own capital from its foundation and took on an additional $14 billion of debt.

Existing and historic investments include:

- Hyflux, a Singapore base water utility. Istithmar bought a 20% stake in July 2004 for approximately S$25 million. Istithmar sold it stake in early 2009. In January 2010, Istithmar entered into a legal dispute with Hyflux over the potential exercise of warrants.
- Time Warner, the US media company. Istithmar bought a 2.4% stake in February 2006, and hired Carl Icahn to work with them on the investment. In early 2006, Time Warner's stock price traded above $50 a share. Jackson disclosed the stake was sold in the second half of 2008, when the stock price was trading below $50 a share.
- InterContinental Hotels Group. Bought in Sept 2007 and sold toward end of 2009. Jackson indicated that Istithmar made no return on the investment.
- Barneys New York, a retailer. Purchased for $825m in June 2008. In September 2009, Istithmar released a statement to counter rumours of a bankruptcy filing by Barney's. Despite Istithmar's wish to dispel rumours about the financial health of Barneys, the Wall Street Journal reported that US billionaire Ronald Burkle, who owns some of Barneys debt offered to convert his debt and an injection of an additional $50 million into Barneys in return for an 80% stake in the company. Istithmar relinquished majority ownership in May 2012 to Perry Capital which was the company's biggest lender in a deal which reduced Barney's debt from $590 million to $50 million (although Istithmar still maintains a minority stake).
- Loehmann's, a specialty retailer in the US, which Istithmar bought in July 2006 for $300m. The vendor was Arcapita, who had bought Loehmann's in October 2004 for $178 million.
- Perella Weinberg Partners, a mergers-and-acquisitions boutique. Istithmar invested $100m for a 10% stake.
- The Pension Insurance Corporation. Other shareholders in the Pension Corporation include JC Flowers, JP Morgan, Coller Capital, Lloyds Banking Group, Och-Ziff Capital Management, Royal Bank of Scotland, Sampo, and Swiss Re. Istithmar committed in December 2006 to invest $170 million in the Pension Corporation.
- Gulf Stream Asset Management, an asset management company. Istithmar acquired a majority stake in April 2008. At the time of the transaction, Gulf has $3.8 billion of assets under management. At the end of 2009 their stated assets under management had fallen to $3.6 billion.
- GLG Partners, a hedge fund based in London. Istithmar acquired its 3% stake directly from the founders of GLG in June 2007. The $3.4 billion reverse acquisition was calculated at a price of $10 a share. At the end of 2009, GLG's shares traded at $3.22 a share.
- ESPA International, a spa and skincare treatments company. In April 2008, Istithmar acquired a 40% stake in ESPA
- Houghton Mifflin Harcourt, a publisher in the US. On 22 February 2010, Houghton Mifflin Harcourt announced that EMPG and HMH had reached an agreement to restructure the finances of the company and recapitalize its balance sheet with a substantial fresh cash investment by institutional investors. According to the Irish Times the investments by the current equity holders of EMPG, including Istithmar and others, will see their combined investment of over $3.5 billion written down to zero.
- EMPGI, an investment company focused on education in China and India. EMPGI was incorporated in May 2008 as joint venture between EMPG, the holding company that controls Houghton Mifflin Harcourt and Istithmar.
- Inchcape Shipping Services (ISS), a ports and marine management business. In February 2010, the Financial Times reported that Istithmar was looking for buyers of ISS for between $600–700m. Istithmar bought ISS for $285m.
- Arcapita, an investment bank based in Bahrain
- Tamweel, a real-estate finance company. Istithmar has a 21.6% stake. In September 2008, Istithmar suspended two of its executives who were working at Tamweel pending an investigation into financial wrongdoings. In August 2009, they were released on bail having been held without charge for a year. The company's shares have been suspended from the stock exchange since November 2008. However, according to Bloomberg, in February 2010, the company is seeking permission to have its shares restart trading. However the company needs circa $272 million for its operations.
- Standard Chartered Bank, listed on the London Stock Exchange with a retail and commercial presence in over 50 countries with a focus on emerging markets. Istithmar has a 2.7% stake. Istithmar bought it stake for $1 billion in October 2006.
- Bumrungrad International Hospital, a healthcare service provider in Thailand and South East Asia
- Cirque du Soleil, an entertainment company. Istithmar bought a 20% stake in August 2008. In a related deal, Istithmar's sister company Nakheel agreed to a 15-year partnership to develop a permanent show on the Palm Jumeirah. In February 2010, a Canadian newspaper wrote that Istithmar may consider selling its stake, which it is estimated to have acquired for $600 million.
- SpiceJet, an Indian Airline. Istithmar invested a total of $50m in SpiceJet by December 2005. The entire 13.4% stake was sold in February 2010 for 1.74 billion rupees ($37 million).
- Real estate in the UK. In November 2009, Bloomberg reported that the Great Portland Estates had acquired two building developments in London (one on Regent Street, another near Oxford Street) for £10 million and a share in future profits. Istithmar had acquired the two properties for £80 million two years earlier.
- Istithmar Hotels, a subsidiary initially formed in April 2006 to hold Istithmar's hospitality assets. Istithmar Hotels acquired a number of landmark New York properties including: W New York Union Square; The Knickerbocker Hotel at Times Square; 280 Park Avenue; 450 Lexington Avenue; the Helmsley Building; and the Mandarin Oriental, New York. The cost of the Mandarin Oriental was $340 million. At the time the price of $1.37 million was highlighted a big increase on the $1 million per room that Istithmar paid for the W Union Square. In Washington DC, Istithmar acquired the Hotel Washington in October 2006 for $150 million from Westbrook Partners who had purchased the hotel earlier that year for $120 million. In London, they acquired One Trafalgar Square. Other investments included the purchase of a 25% shareholding in a Thai real estate developer, Raimon Land Public Company Limited.
- IHI plc. In December 2006, Istithmar Hotels invested Euro 178 million in International Hotel Investments, a Maltese company listed on the stock exchange. According to the Bond Prospectus of IHI issued in March 2010, Istithmar owns 33% of IHI. Istithmar made its investment at €1 a share. On 2 March 2010, the stock traded at Eu 0.80 a share according to the Maltese Stock Exchange website.
- Nakheel Hotels. In December 2007, Istithmar Hotels merged with its sister company Nakheel Hotels, keeping the name Nakheel Hotels, with CEO of the Istithmar division becoming CEO of the merged entity. At the time, the business was reported to have investments with a value of $3 billion. Projects that were highlighted included: Trump International Hotel and Tower (Dubai) on The Palm Jumeirah; Mandarin Oriental New York; W Union Square; Hotel Washington in DC; a significant equity stake in Kerzner International; a significant equity stake in IHI plc; and the QE2. In February 2008, Nakheel Hotels announced the acquisition of a 50% stake in a Mexican resort based on an enterprise value of $315 million. In April 2008, Nakheel announced the investment of $375 million for a 50% stake in the Fontainebleau Miami Beach resort. The resort found itself in financial difficulty, and in March 2010, Istithmar and other equity holders had to offer an injection of an additional $100 million of equity.
- Trump International Hotel and Tower (Dubai). In December 2009 Donald Trump was interviewed on CNBC and asked about Dubai. The Trump Tower had been expected to be a $1.1 billion project with a 62-story building with penthouses costing $3,000 a square foot or $30 million a penthouse. Trump stated: I was going to do a deal there with Nakheel and they paid me a lot of money to go into a partnership and they were getting ready to start the building about a year ago and they were all excited and then the market collapsed on them.
- The QE2 ocean liner. Purchased for $100 million from Cunard in June 2007 and operated by Accor as a floating hotel and museum.
- Kerzner International. In July 2005, Istithmar entered into a partnership with Kerzner to build Atlantis, The Palm a resort at Palm Jumeirah in Dubai. The project was valued at $1.2 billion of which $500 million was equity from the shareholders. In March 2006, Istithmar led a consortium to take Kerzner International private in a transaction worth $3.6 billion. Istithmar increased its shareholding from 13% to 30% in the deal.
- W Hotel, New York Union Square. The Times reports that Istithmar incurred a $283m loss, when it accepted $2m for its stake in the W Hotel, after it defaulted on its debts. LEM, an affiliate of Lubert-Adler Real Estate Funds now controls the hotel. On 1 March 2010, Bloomberg reported that the lender to Istithmar, 201 Park Avenue South PEH LLC, sued Istithmar claiming that "Istithmar had misappropriated approximately $3.2 million from an account established to fund renovations to the hotel and had improperly used these funds for its own personal uses" and over a $75 million loan guarantee.
- Knickerbocker Hotel. The Wall Street Journal reported on 3 March 2010, that Istithmar had defaulted on its $300 million mortgage to Danske Bank. In addition to the 300,000-square-foot (28,000 m^{2}) building at 42nd and Broadway in New York, Istithmar had acquired an adjoining site for $76 million. The plan was to convert the building from its current use, an office block, back into an upmarket hotel.
- Palm Utilities, a Dubai-based utilities company fully owned by Istithmar World. Palm Utilities is a holding company to Palm District Cooling that provides chilled water and district cooling services to various communities and developments in Dubai.

In addition to preceding list of investments, the re-organisation of Dubai World, announced in October 2009, led to a number of other assets being transfer to Istithmar from an investment management perspective. These assets included Dubai World Africa, an investment vehicle for the African Continent. The flagship investment is the Victoria & Alfred Waterfront in Cape Town, South Africa. Other investments include game reserves, wildlife conservation and eco tourism in Africa, with operations in South Africa, Rwanda, Comoros, Mozambique, Senegal and Zimbabwe.
