= Barry O'Callaghan =

Irish businessman

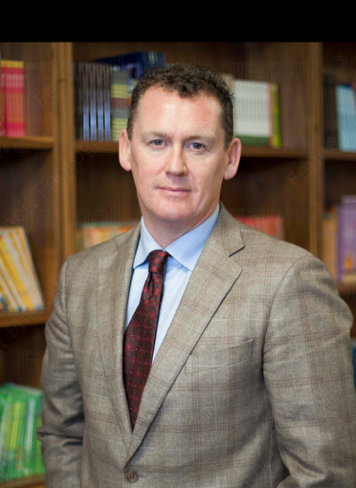
- Born: 1969 (age 56–57); Mitchelstown, County Cork, Ireland
- Education: Trinity College Dublin
- Occupation: Business executive
- Known for: Former CEO of EMPG, formerly known as Riverdeep
- Spouse: Geraldine McGeough
- Children: 4

Barry O'Callaghan (born 1969) is an Irish business executive and financier. He is the chairman and CEO of AKLO Capital (a private investment office) and the former CEO of HMH. He grew the small educational software company Riverdeep into the largest K-12 publishing company in the American education system through a series of acquisitions.

== Early life and education ==
Barry O'Callaghan was born in 1969 in Mitchelstown, County Cork, Ireland. His father was a doctor. O'Callaghan was educated at Clongowes Wood College, a Jesuit secondary boarding school. He was captain of the school's senior cup rugby team and later he played rugby for Trinity College Dublin, where he studied law in the late 1980s. According to O'Callaghan, after graduating he no longer wanted to pursue a career in law.

== Career ==
=== Early work ===
After getting a degree in law, Barry O'Callaghan got a job at investment bank Morgan Stanley, where he "quickly prospered" working in mergers & acquisitions. He worked in the London office, then later in the Hong Kong office, before moving to New York City to work at Salomon Smith Barney near the beginning of the dot-com bubble. In 1997 O'Callaghan got a senior job the telecommunications and technology division of investment bank Credit Suisse First Boston. There he helped internet companies prepare to go public. O'Callaghan quit Credit Suisse First Boston in 1999 to become the chief executive officer of the digital publishing startup, Riverdeep, in order to take the company public.

=== Riverdeep/HMH Group, EMPG & EMPGi ===
Just as CD-ROMs were gaining popularity, O'Callaghan transitioned Riverdeep away from CDs into offering online subscriptions to educational content. He led the acquisition of a software company called Logal, which sold math curriculum online. More significantly, it had intellectual property for a method of converting CD-ROM applications into online downloads. This acquisition was the beginning of O'Callaghan's efforts to web-enable the company's software. It was followed by a $24 million acquisition of ED-Vantage and an $85 million acquisition of Edmark. Both were IBM subsidiaries that provided digital educational content online and together the acquisitions made IBM a 14 percent shareholder in Riverdeep. As O'Callaghan expanded Riverdeep's network of distribution partners that sold the software to individual schools, IBM became a significant partner in referring business to Riverdeep.

O'Callaghan took Riverdeep through an initial public offering on Nasdaq in 2000. Initially it received a $2 billion valuation after having tripled in share price over a few days of trading. O'Callaghan's seven percent interest in the company became worth $126 million. The Sunday Business Post said Riverdeep's time as a public company was difficult, in particular due to criticisms from activist investor David Rocker, who accused Riverdeep of shady accounting practices.

In response to Rocker's criticisms and improving financials, but a declining share price as the tech bubble declined, O'Callaghan and others took the company private, through a management buyout in 2003. The buyout brought O'Callaghan's interest in the company to 21 percent. From 2003 to 2004, he "streamlined" the company, negotiated 300 million euro in bonds and worked to expand into international markets, like the United Kingdom and Saudi Arabia.

O'Callaghan and company founder Pat McDonagh bought the shares of venture capitalists; then O'Callaghan bought McDonagh's portion in 2006, giving O'Callaghan a 59.4 percent share of the company. Ernst & Young "abruptly" left as the company's accounting auditors that year, saying the company made "incorrect representations" about "a material contract," an allegation O'Callaghan denied. O'Callaghan used low-interest loans to fund acquisitions of traditional print publishers. At first he led the acquisition of smaller publishers, before buying Houghton Mifflin and Reed Elsevier's US school business, which were bought for $1.75 billion and $4 billion in 2006 and 2007 respectively. He merged Riverdeep with Houghton Mifflin in 2006 to create the Education Media and Publishing Group (EMPG), before acquiring Harcourt Education in America from Reed Elsevier. O'Callaghan owned about one-third of the company and is estimated to have had 1.5 billion euro in assets after both acquisitions. He was the largest investor in the company. The acquisitions made EMPG the largest educational publisher in the US market, but it became laden with debt from loans made to fund the acquisitions.

In 2008, the great recession caused US states, and California in particular, to cut spending on textbooks from EMPG. As education budgets were cut, the company was forced to re-negotiate with bondholders. It owed $700 million per year in interest payments for the loan-funded acquisitions. The Houghton Mifflin brand also fell out of favor with many in the literary community after discontinuing some of its contracts with writers. O'Callaghan became chief executive officer of Houghton Mifflin Harcourt in April 2009, after the prior CEO retired.

O'Callaghan refinanced the company in 2009, reducing its debt by $1 billion. He tried to sell the Houghton Mifflin business, but turned down the offers he got as being too low. In 2010, bondholders that Riverdeep was indebted to converted their debts into equity in the company, and took control of the business in order to avoid bankruptcy. This almost completely eliminated the interests of shareholders, including O'Callaghan, whose shares were used as collateral for most of the loans. He went from being seventh place in the Sunday Times list of richest people, to the 21st. He had $1.2 billion in assets in 2008 and 348 million by the end of 2009, as his 22% stake in the company was almost completely eliminated. O'Callaghan continued to serve as CEO until resigning from that position in 2011 and serving as an advisor for an additional year. During this time, the company was restructured, reducing its debt by another $4 billion.

O'Callaghan said the company's financial problems were the result of unpredictable market circumstances for textbook purchases and paying too much for the Houghton Mifflin business. He blamed "bad timing, and, frankly, bad luck." According to The Independent, "he expanded too quickly and took on too much debt just as the credit crisis began." The Irish Times said O'Callaghan responded to the crisis quickly thanks to "deft management" and the "loyalty of his business partners." The Globe said he was a "freewheeling Irishman" that was skating on "thin ice." Business author Paul Carro said O'Callaghan had built "a house of cards" where failure was inevitable.

=== Rise Global ===
In 2011, Rise Global purchased the Chinese business of Houghton Mifflin and O'Callaghan became CEO of Rise Global, which teaches English to people in Asia, the Middle East and elsewhere. He personally owns exclusive rights to some of HMH’s educational materials for teaching the English language. He sold the Rise China Chinese business to Bain Capital for 14 times its annual profit due to Chinese legal restrictions on foreigners owning educational assets in China. The success of the Rise China led O'Callaghan to found the Rise Global network including Rise Korea, in which he aims to make English language more applicable and relevant to Korean students.

=== Other work ===
O'Callaghan also has a controlling interest in Patheos, a spirituality website. He is the owner of Beanstalk Innovation, an online education consultancy in Massachusetts. He owns the Cliff Hotel Collection in Ireland.He owns the Cliff House hotel and Cliff Townhouse restaurant and guesthouse in Ireland. In 2016 he bought a popular wedding venue, Village at Lyons, for €6 million in 2016.

== Personal life ==
O'Callaghan met his wife, Geraldine McGeough, at Trinity College. They have three daughters and a son.
