= Tamweel =

Subsidiary of Dubai World

- Company type: Government owned
- Industry: Real estate
- Founded: 2000; 26 years ago
- Headquarters: Dubai, United Arab Emirates
- Key people: Abdulla Ali AlHamli (Chairman), Varun Sood (CEO)
- Number of employees: 160
- Website: www.tamweel.ae/en/

Tamweel was a Dubai-based real estate finance and development company. The company had two branches in the United Arab Emirates, with the head office in Port Saeed, Dubai and another branch in Marina Mall, Abu Dhabi.

The company was engaged in Islamic Sharia-compliant property financing and investment activities, including Murabaha, Ijara, Forward Ijara, Istisna, Baiti, and Yusr. Its financing solutions were divided into two main categories: home financing and commercial financing. The company was also involved in the business of property development and trading.

== History ==
Tamweel was established in March 2004 as a limited liability company. In July 2006, the company moved to a public joint-stock company structure and was listed on the Dubai Financial Market.

In November 2008, it was announced that the federal government of the United Arab Emirates would combine Amlak and Tamweel, which were later merged into an Islamic bank in early 2010.

== See also ==
- Meraas
