= Dubai Maritime City =

Multipurpose maritime zone in Dubai, UAE

Coordinates: 25.266645°N 55.265908°E

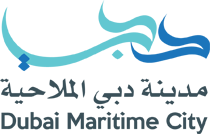
Official Logo

Dubai Maritime City (DMC) is a multipurpose maritime zone. It is a member of the DP World group of companies. Dubai Maritime City was expected to be fully operational by 2012, and by January 2021 had completed 80% of the first phase's infrastructure works. In February 2022 it was announced that DP World would launch a major project to develop DMC's infrastructure at a cost of Dh140 million. The industrial part of Dubai Maritime City is fully operational, with a large number of business partners operating from DMC. The industrial precinct is active and consists of marine services primarily dealing with ship lifts, ship repair plots, warehouses, workshops, as well as supporting retail and showrooms.

== Introduction ==
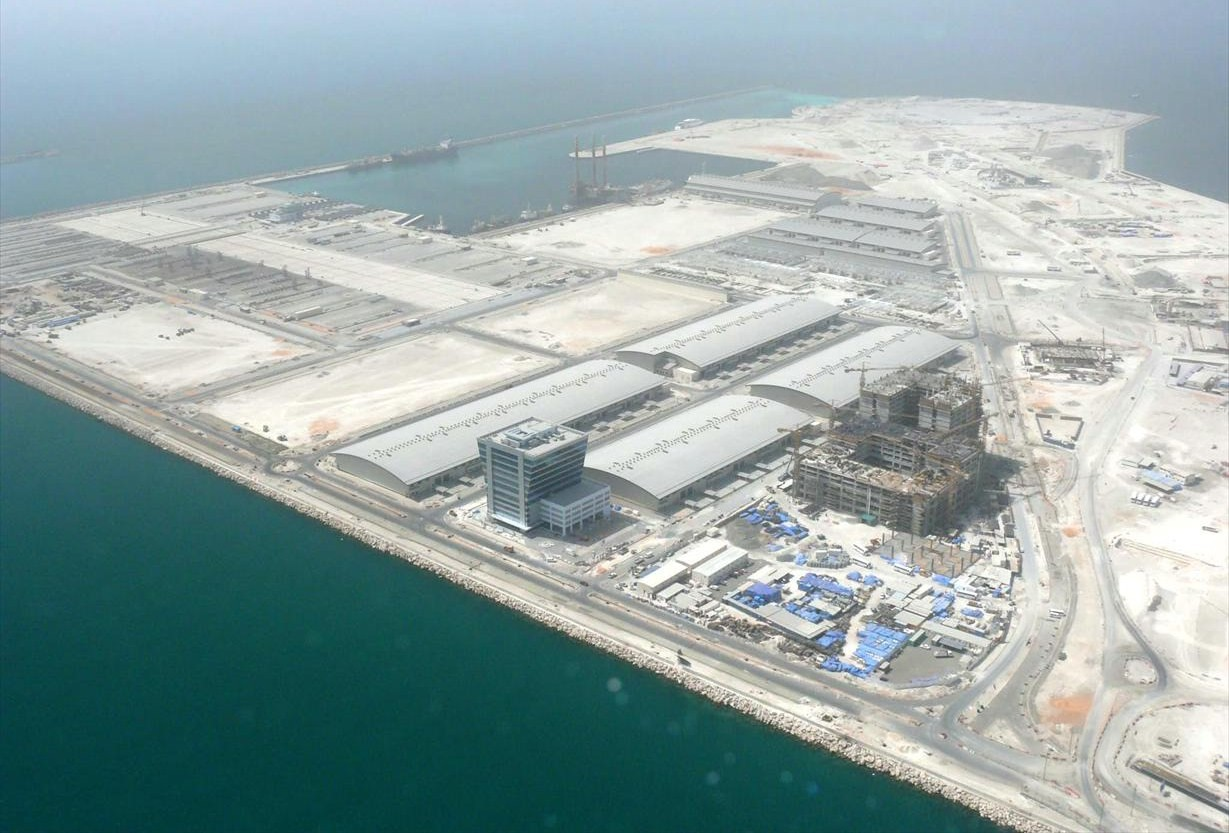
Dubai Maritime City on 8 May 2008

The 2.27 million square metre Dubai Maritime City is divided into the Maritime Centre, the Industrial Precinct, the Academic Quarter, the Marina District, the Harbour Residence, and the Harbour Offices. The Maritime Center District is the centerpiece of Dubai's Maritime City. Created as an urban corporate park, the District comprises eight waterfront and three interior parcels organized around a central boulevard.

The Maritime Centre comprises a cluster of five high-rise towers called the Creek Towers and Plaza, Landmark Tower, located at the head of the man-made peninsula, and seven plots reserved for potential developers planning to construct their own towers. The centre will also feature a 5-star business hotel and premium service apartments.

== Zones ==
=== Industrial Precinct ===
This sector is a hub for ship repair facilities, yacht charter, yacht repair and manufacturing, as well as workshop units. The precinct will be overseen by the management of Jadaf Dubai. A 1,270-meter stretch of wet berthing has been made available in this precinct, alongside 42 dry berths of various sizes. The large number of berthing spaces available here alleviates a space crunch for boats in Dubai. The area contains 19 ship repair plots and two ship lifts capable of lifting 3,000 and 6,000 tons each. More than 100 workshops and warehouses complete the industrial precinct.

On October 9, 2012, Grandweld Shipyards opened its new facility in Dubai Maritime City's industrial precinct. This Dubai Maritime City based company is a builder of vessels including crew boats, OSVs, tugs and high-speed vessels.

=== Dubai Maritime City Campus ===
The Dubai Maritime City Campus is located in the middle of Dubai Maritime City. The institutions here offers a syllabus encompassing marine engineering, marine transportation, and naval science, among others. The academy has the capabilities to provide for 1,300 students. The area also contains many other buildings such as a mosque, 500-room business hotel, seafarers club, convention center, and two-story library.

=== The Maritime Center ===
The Maritime Center is the core of Dubai Maritime City. It consists of eight waterfront and three interior parcels, which will serve as an international hub for maritime businesses. Also under construction in the area is the 45-story 229 metres (751 ft) tall Landmark Tower, which will function as a 5-star business hotel upon completion. Many other projects were also planned such as the Swiftship Towers, 200 metres (656 ft) IRIS Mist hotel, Kensington Krystal hotel, Senali Aquamarine apartments, the Creek Towers office center, and a currently unnamed six-star hotel.

=== Harbor Offices ===
The gateway to Dubai Maritime City contains 19 development plots offered for office tower development. This zone overlooks the harbor and is the nearest precinct to the causeway linking the project to the rest of Dubai.

=== Marina District and Harbor Residences ===
The district includes a group of mixed-use activity areas which cater to yacht owners and also houses restaurants, retail outlets and entertainment facilities. There are 14 plots available for construction of high-rise residential towers.

== Location ==
Dubai Maritime City lies in a northerly direction near the creek area business district, between Port Rashid and Dubai Dry Docks. Dubai Maritime city is located at a strategic position located just 1 km from jumeirah beach road, 1.5 km from Bur Dubai, 2.5 km from Shindaga tunnel in Deira, 10 km from Dubai International Airport and 3 km from Sheikh Zayed Road. The site is connected by a causeway to the wider road network, providing access to all of Dubai's principle expressways including Sheikh Zayed Road.

== Purpose ==
When completed, Dubai Maritime City will be a mixed use development for the maritime industry, comprising industrial, commercial, residential and leisure facilities housed on a man-made peninsula by reclamation of land between Port Rashid and Dubai Dry Docks. As a peninsula development. Upon completion, it will feature the country's first National Maritime Museum and ship repair and maintenance facilities. The Dubai Maritime City Campus incorporates education, training, and research in a maritime complex accommodating over 1300 students in-training to support maritime businesses and services.

== Recent developments ==
As of March 2009, the first phase of Dubai Maritime city of constructing 1000 berth marina has been completed, however construction has been halted in 2010 due to financial crises in Dubai. The entirety of the first phase of construction consisting of 96 low and high rise towers was completed in March 2012. Phase 2 and 3 focus on finalizing the area and adding additional commercial towers and infrastructure. The entire project was expected to be completed by 2014.

As of 1 March 2020, the Phase 1 of infrastructure developing, with cost of $38 million, is 25% complete, and it is expected to be completed by the early 2021.

In February 2022 Dubai Maritime City announced the launch of a Dh140 million infrastructure project to develop road, water, telecom and other facilities at the maritime hub. The new DMC infrastructure will integrate DMC with the Mina Rashid area that includes the QE2 Hotel, P&O Marinas and Marina Cubes.

== See also ==
- Palm Islands
- The world Islands
