= List of free economic zones =

In special economic zones business and trades laws differ from the rest of the country. The term, and a number of other terms, can have different specific meanings in different countries and publications. Often they have relaxed jurisdiction of customs or related national regulations. They can be ports or other large areas or smaller allocated areas.

Terms include free port (porto Franco), free zone (zona franca), bonded area (US: foreign-trade zone), free economic zone, free-trade zone, export processing zone and maquiladora.

Most commonly a free port is a special customs area or small customs territory with generally less strict customs regulations (or no customs duties or controls for transshipment). Earlier in history, some free ports enjoyed political autonomy. Many international airports have free ports, though they tend to be called customs areas, customs zones, or international zones.

== Africa ==
=== Tanzania ===
- Mtwara Freeport Zone

=== Libya ===
- Misurata Free Zone

=== Liberia ===
- Free Port of Monrovia

=== Egypt ===
- Port Said
- Suez Canal Container Terminal

=== Eritrea ===
- Assab Free Port and International Airport
- Massawa Free Port and International Airport

=== Morocco ===
- Atlantic Free Zone Kenitra
- Tangier Exportation Free Zone

=== Mauritius ===
- The Mauritius Free Port

=== Nigeria ===
Although the enabling act came into effect in 1992, the pioneer Free Zone (the Calabar Free Trade Zone) was not fully completed until 1999, and commenced operation after official commissioning in November 2001. Since then, the Free Zones Scheme has been used as a vehicle for industrial and commercial development of the country. Private Sector participation and partnership with the Federal Government and other tiers of government has helped spread the scheme. This has culminated in the establishment of specialised Free Zones and other types of Zones, namely:

Serial number	Name	Location	Status	Ownership
1	Snake Island Integrated Free Zone	Lagos	Operational	Private
2	Kano Free Trade Zone (KFTZ)	Kano State	Operational	Fed. Govt.
3	Onne oil & Gas Free Zone	River State	Operational	Under Parallel Authority
4	Tinapa Free Zone & Tourism Resort	CRS	Operational	Private/Public
5	Calabar Free Trade Zone (CFTZ)	CRS	Operational	Fed. Govt.
6	Maigatari Border Free Zone	Jigawa State	Operational	State
7	LADOL Free Zone	Lagos	Operational	Private
8	Enpower, Enugu Industrial Park Free Zone	Enugu	Operational	Private
9	Airline Services Export Proc. Zone	Lagos State	Operational	Private
10	ALSCON Export Processing Zone	Akwa Ibon	Operational	Private
11	Ogun Guangdong Free Trade Zone	Ogun State	Operational	Public/ Private
12	Sebore Farms Export Processing Zones	Adamawa State	Operational	Private
13	Ibom Science & Tech. Park Free Zone	Akwa Ibom	Under Cons.	Public/Private
14	Living Spring Free Zone	Osun State	Under Cons.	State
15	Lekki Free Zone	Lagos State	Operational	State/ Private
16	Brass LNG Free Zone	Bayelsa	Under Cons.	Public/Private
17	Abuja Technological Village Free Zone	Abuja	Under Cons.	Public/Private
18	Specialized Railway Industrial FTZ - Kajola	Ogun State	Under Cons.	Public/Private
19	Imo Guangdong FTZ	Imo State	Under Cons.	Public/Private
20	OK Free Trade Zone	Ondo & Ogun	Under Cons.	States/ Private
21	Lagos Free Zone	Lagos State	Under Cons.	Private
22	Kwara Free Zone	Kwara State	Declaration	State Govt.
23	Oluyole Free Trade Zone	Oyo State	Declaration	State Govt.
24	Koko Free Trade Zone	Delta State	Declaration	State Govt.
25	OILSS Logistics Free Zone	Lagos	Declaration	Private
26	Banki Border Free Zone	Borno State	Declaration	State
27	NAHCO Free Trade Zone	Lagos State	Operational	Private

The introduction of free zones has played a large role in increasing the amount of investment into Nigeria. When all the free zones are fully operational, Nigeria is projected to play a large role in expanding export-driven manufacturing activities in Africa.

== Asia ==
=== Azerbaijan ===
- Alat

=== Bahrain ===
- Manama

=== China ===
- Guangzhou
- Shanghai
- Shenzhen
- Tianjin
- Xiamen
- Zhuhai

=== Hong Kong ===
- Central Ferry Piers, Victoria City
- Container Terminal 9, Tsing Yi
- Kai Tak Cruise Terminal, Kowloon
- Kwai Tsing Container Terminals, Stonecutters Island
- River Trade Terminal, Tuen Mun
- Tsim Sha Tsui Ocean Terminal, Kowloon
- Tsim Sha Tsui Ferry Pier, Kowloon
- Tuen Mun Ferry Pier, Tuen Mun

=== India ===
- Astromar Free Zone

=== Indonesia ===
- Batam, Riau Islands

=== Iran ===
- Anzali
- Arvand Free Zone
- Chabahar
- Kish Island
- Aras Free Zone
- Maku Free Zone
- Qeshm

=== Japan ===
- Nagasaki
- Niigata
- Tokyo

=== Lebanon ===
- Port of Beirut
- Port of Tripoli (Lebanon)

=== Macau ===
- Inner Harbour Ferry Terminal, Cotai West
- Outer Harbour Ferry Terminal, Sé, Macau Peninsula
- Taipa Ferry Terminal, Taipa East
- Kai Ho Port, Coloane

=== Malaysia ===
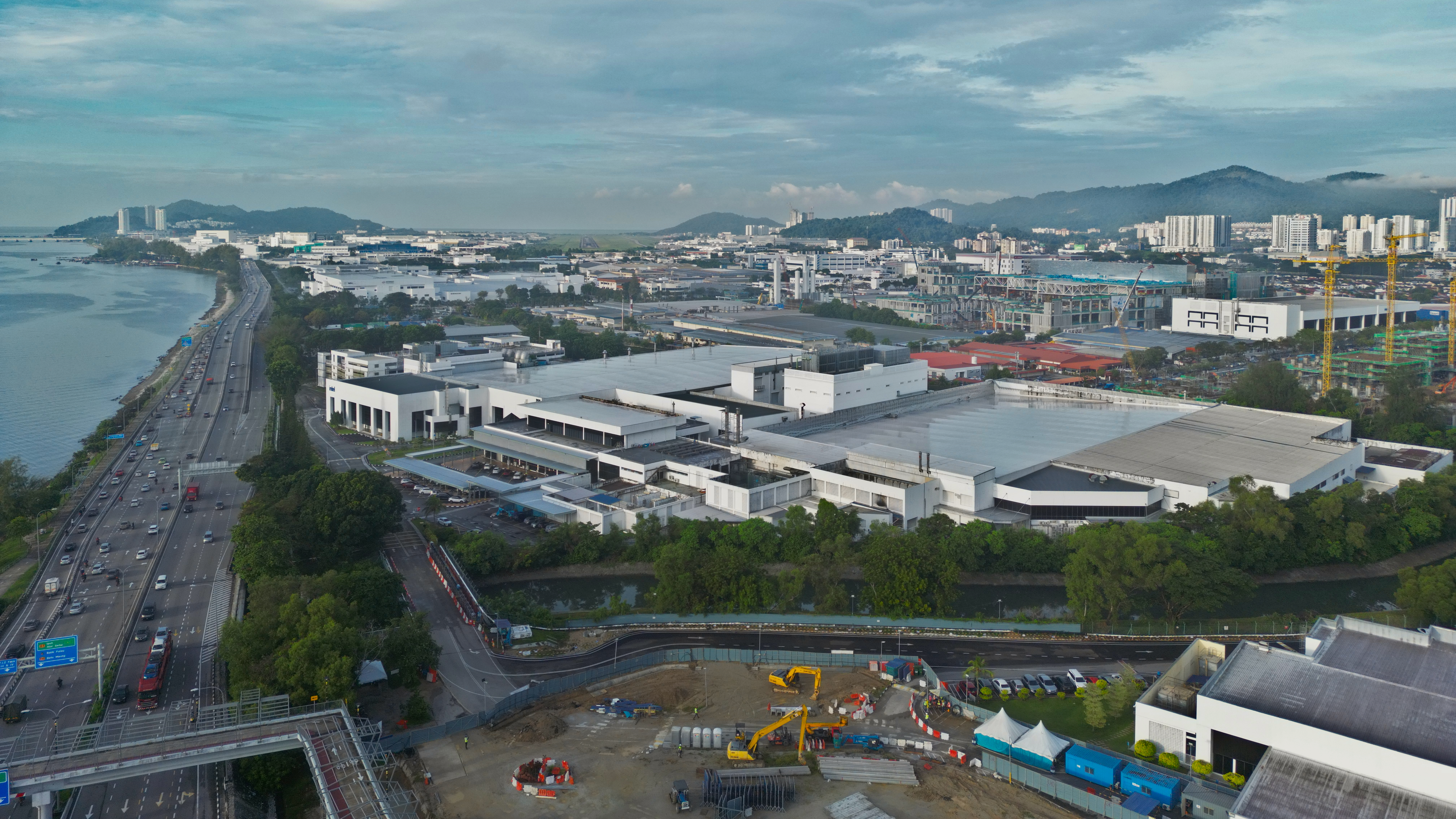
Bayan Lepas Free Industrial Zone, also known as the Silicon Valley of the East

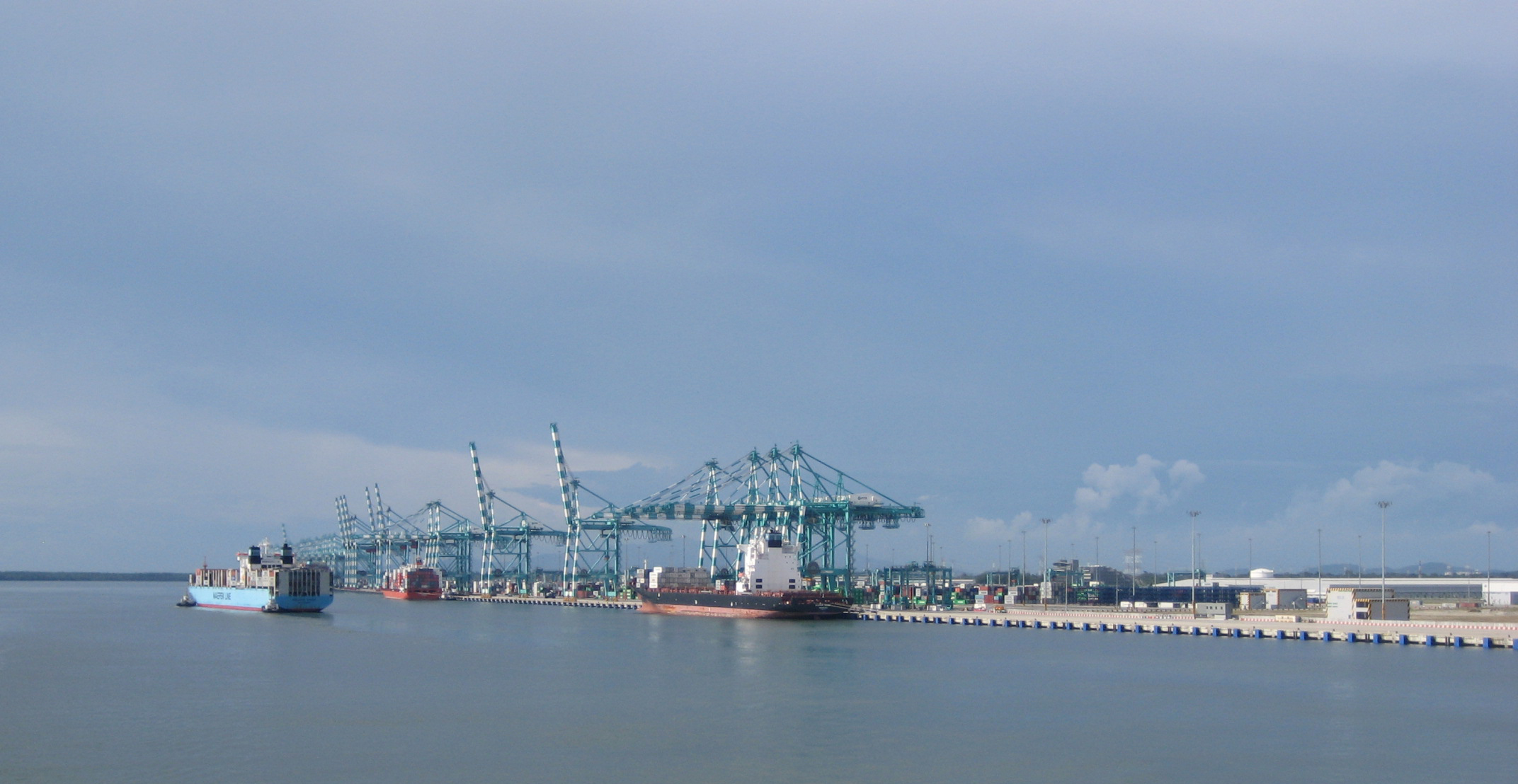
Port of Tanjung Pelepas, the 15th busiest container port in the world

- Bayan Lepas Free Industrial Zone, George Town, Penang
- Labuan
- Langkawi
- Pangkor Perak, Alcohol, tobacco and vehicles are not Duty free.
- Port of Tanjung Pelepas, Johor
- Tioman Island
- Waterfront ferry terminal and shopping complex Johor Bahru

=== Mongolia ===
- Altanbulag Free Trade Zone
- Tsagaannuur Free Economic Zone
- Zamyn-Üüd Free Economic Zone

=== Pakistan ===
- Gwadar Port

=== Philippines ===
- Zamboanga City Special Economic Zone Authority

=== Singapore ===
- Singapore

=== South Korea ===
- Busan-Jinhae Free Economic Zone
- Gwangyang Bay Area Free Economic Zone
- Incheon Free Economic Zone
- Ulsan Free Economic Zone
- Gwangju Free Economic Zone
- Daegu-Gyeongbuk Free Economic Zone
- Chungbuk Free Economic Zone
- East Coast Free Economic Zone

=== Taiwan ===
- Port of Kaohsiung Free Trade Zone
- Port of Keelung Free Trade Zone
- Port of Taichung Free Trade Zone
- Port of Taipei Free Trade Zone
- Taoyuan Air Cargo Park Free Trade Zone

=== Thailand ===
- Port of Bangkok
- Port of Chiang Kong
- Port of Chieng Saen
- Port of Laem Chabang
- Port of Ranong

=== Turkey ===
- Mersin Free Zone, Mersin
- Antalya Free Zone, Antalya
- Aegean Free Zone, İzmir
- Istanbul Atatürk Airport Free Zone, Istanbul
- Trabzon Free Zone, Trabzon
- Istanbul Leather Industry Free Zone, Istanbul
- East Anatolia Free Zone, Erzurum
- Mardin Free Zone, Mardin
- Istanbul Stock Exchange Free Zone (İMKB), Istanbul
- İzmir Menemen Leather Free Zone, Menemen
- Rize Free Zone, Rize
- Samsun Free Zone, Samsun
- Istanbul Tracia Free Zone, Istanbul
- Kayseri Free Zone, Kayseri
- Adana Yumurtalık Free Zone, Yumurtalık
- European Free Zone, Çorlu
- Gaziantep Free Zone, Gaziantep
- Bursa Free Zone, Bursa
- Kocaeli Free Zone, Kocaeli
- Denizli Free Zone, Denizli
- Tübitak Free Zone, Gebze

=== United Arab Emirates ===
- Abu Dhabi Airport Free Zone (ADAFZ)
- Ahmed Bin Rashid Free Zone (ABRFZ)
- Ajman Free Zone (AFZ)
- Ajman Media City Free Zone (AMCFZ)
- Creative City
- Dubai Airport Freezone (DAFZ)
- Dubai Biotechnology & Research Park (DuBiotech)
- Dubai Car and Automotive City Free Zone (DUCAMZ)
- Dubai Gold and Diamond Park
- Dubai Healthcare City
- Dubai Industrial City (DIC)
- Dubai International Academic City
- Dubai International Financial Centre (DIFC)
- Dubai Internet City
- Dubai Knowledge Village
- Dubai Logistics City
- Dubai Media City
- Dubai Multi Commodities Centre Free Zone
- Dubai Outsource Zone
- Dubai Silicon Oasis (DSO)
- Dubai Technology and Media Free Zone (TECOM)
- Dubai TechnoPark
- DuBiotech
- Economic Zones World (EZW)
- Fujairah Free Zone (FFZ)
- Hamriyah Free Zone
- Higher Corporation for Specialized Economic Zones (HCSEZ) - ZonesCorp
- Industrial City of Abu Dhabi
- International Media Production Zone
- Jebel Ali Free Zone (JAFZA)
- JLT Free Zone Dubai
- Khalifa Port and Khalifa Industrial Zone Abu Dhabi (Kizad)
- RAK Investment Authority Free Zone (RAKIA FZ)
- Ras Al Khaimah Free Trade Zone
- Ras Al Khaimah IT Park
- Ras Al Khaimah Media Free Zone
- Sharjah Airport International Free Zone (SAIF)
- Sharjah Publishing City (SPC)
- Sharjah Media City (SHAMS)
- Umm Al Quwain Free Trade Zone
- Meydan Free Zone
- DUQE

=== Uzbekistan ===
- Nukus FEZ

== Europe ==
=== European Union ===
European Union free zones:

Austria

- Linz (port on river Danube) - ceased
- Vienna (port on river Danube) - ceased

Bulgaria

- Free Zone Bourgas
- Free Zone Plovdiv
- Free Zone Pyce
- Free Zone Rousse

Croatia

- Danube free zone of Vukovar
- Free zone of Kukuljanovo
- Free zone of Port of Rijeka - Škrljevo
- Free zone of Osijek
- Free zone of Zagreb
- Free zone of Krapina-Zagorje
- Free zone of Split-Dalmatia
- Free zone of Port of Ploče
- Free zone of Port of Pula
- Free zone of Port of Split

Cyprus

- Limassol Free Zone - ceased
- Larnaca Free Zone - ceased
- Customs Warehousing & Free Zones, Nicosia

Czech Republic

- Free zone Ostrava
- Free zone Pardubice

Denmark

- Freeport of Copenhagen (Københavns Frihavn), Copenhagen

Estonia

- Muuga Free Zone
- Sillamäe Free Zone
- Paldiski free zone

Finland

- Free zone of Lappeenranta (Lappeenrannan Vapaa-alue) - ceased
- Freeport of Hanko (Hangon Vapaasatama) - ceased

France

- Free Zone of Le Verdon - Port de Bordeaux (Zone franche du Verdon — Port de Bordeaux)

Germany

- Freeport of Bremerhaven (Freihafen Bremerhaven)
- Freeport of Cuxhaven (Freihafen Cuxhaven), since 1896
- Freeport of Deggendorf (Freihafen Deggendorf), since 1989 - ceased
- Freeport of Duisburg (Freihafen Duisburg), since 1989 - ceased
- Speicherstadt, Hamburg - ceased

Greece

- Free zone of Evros (Debzos) - ceased
- Free zone of Heraklion
- Free zone of Piraeus
- Free zone of Thessaloniki
- Free Zone of Platygiali

Hungary

- Customs free zone Záhony

Ireland

- Port of Cork Free Port - ceased
- Shannon Free Zone (1959 - 2003) - ceased

Italy

- Aosta Valley - ceased
- Campione d'Italia - ceased
- Livigno - ceased
- Livorno, 1675–1860 - ceased
- Port of Trieste
- Free Zone of Venice (Porto franco di Venezia)
- Free Zone of Portovesme
- Free Zone of Taranto
- Free Zone of Brindisi
- Free Zone Of Brindisi – Capobianco

Latvia

- Free port of Riga
- Free port of Ventspils
- Rezekne SEZ
- Latgale SEZ - ceased
- Liepaja SEZ

Lithuania

- Akmenė Free Economic Zone - ceased
- Kaunas Free Economic Zone
- Kėdainiai Free Economic Zone - ceased
- Klaipėda Free Economic Zone
- Marijampolė Free Economic Zone - ceased
- Panevėžys Free Economic Zone - ceased
- Šiauliai Free Economic Zone - ceased

Luxembourg

- Luxembourg Freeport

Malta

- Malta Freeport

Poland

- Free Customs Zone Warsaw Airport
- Free Customs Zone Gliwice
- Free Duty Zone Terespol
- Free Customs Zone Szczecin
- Free Customs Zone Świnoujście
- Free Customs Zone Gdańsk
- Free Customs Zone Mszczonów

Portugal

- The Free Trade Zone of Madeira, which is composed by the following tax benefits
  - Industrial Free Zone of Caniçal
  - International Business Centre of Madeira
  - International Ship Registry of Madeira

Romania

- Port of Constanţa, January 2007
- Free zone Curtici Arad
- Free zone Galati
- Free zone Giurgiu
- Free zone Braila
- Free zone Sulina
- Free zone Constanta Sud si Basarabi

Slovenia

- Port of Koper

Spain

- Free zone of Barcelona (Zona Franca (Barcelona))
- Free zone of Cádiz (Zona franca de Cádiz)
- Free zone of Vigo (Vigo Free Trade Zone Consortium)
- Free zone of Las Palmas de Gran Canaria (Zona franca de Las Palmas de Gran Canaria)
- Free zone of Santander (Zona franca de Santander)
- Free zone of Sevilla (Zona franca de Sevilla)
- Free zone of Santa Cruz de Tenerife (Zona franca de Tenerife)
- Free Zone of the Bay of Algeciras
- (Ceuta and Melilla are not Free Ports or Free zones because they are part of Spain, but not part of the European union for customs and excises)

Sweden

- Marstrand Free Port, 18th century - ceased
- Saint-Barthélemy, 1785–1878 - ceased
- Stockholms frihamn, 1919–1995 - ceased
- Frihamnen, Göteborg, 1922-2000(?) - ceased

=== Albania ===
- Koplik (Albanian Alps)
- Spitalle (Port of Durrës)

=== Armenia ===
- Meghri

=== Belarus ===
- Brest FEZ
- Grodno FEZ
- Mogilev Free Enterprise Zone

=== Georgia ===
- Adjara autonomous republic
- Batumi, 1878-1886 (then Russia)

=== Bosnia and Herzegovina ===
- Free Zone Trebinje
- Free zone Hercegovina
- Free zone Vogosca
- Free zone Visoko

=== Moldova ===
- Giurgiulești Freeport
- Expo-Business Chișinău, Chișinău)
- Ungheni-Business
- Tvardita
- Otaci-Business
- Valkanes
- Taraclia
- Free International Airport of Mărculești

=== Monaco ===
- Monaco Freeport

=== Montenegro ===
- Port of Bar Free Zone

=== North Macedonia ===
Тechnological–Industrial Development Zones (TIDZs)

- 12 Free Zones

=== Russia ===
- Nakhodka
- Vladivostok, 1861–1909, 2015 (Free port of Vladivostok)

=== Serbia ===
Serbia has 14 free economic zones as of September 2017; these are:

- Free Zone Apatin
- Free Zone FAS-Kragujevac
- Free Zone Kruševac
- Free Zone Niš-South
- Free Zone Novi Sad
- Free Zone Pirot
- Free Zone Priboj
- Free Zone Šabac
- Free Zone Smederevo
- Free Zone Subotica
- Free Zone Svilajnac
- Free Zone Užice
- Free Zone Vranje
- Free Zone Zrenjanin

=== Switzerland ===
- Geneva Freeport, La Praille, Geneva
- Geneva Cointrin International Airport free port, Geneva
- Magazzini Generali con Punto Franco SA, Chiasso and Stabio, free port and bonded warehouse, Chiasso
- PESA - Port-Franc et Entrepôts de Lausanne-Chavornay SA, free port and bonded warehouse, Chavornay (Vaud)
- SEV - Société des Entrepôts Vevey SA, free port and bonded warehouse, Vevey

=== Ukraine ===
- Free port and free economic zone Odesa
  - 1819-1858
  - Trade sea port of Odesa, January 1, 2000 for 25 years

=== United Kingdom ===
Main article: Free ports in the United Kingdom
- Anglesey Freeport
- Celtic Freeport
- East Midlands Airport Freeport
- Forth Green Freeport
- Freeport East
- Humber Freeport
- Inverness and Cromarty Firth Freeport
- Liverpool City Region Freeport
- Plymouth and South Devon Freeport
- Solent Free Zone
- Teesside Freeport
- Thames Freeport

==== Gibraltar ====
- Port of Gibraltar

==== Isle of Man ====
- Isle of Man Airport (Ballasala)

== The Americas ==
=== Argentina ===
Law 19640: Special Customs Area for the Island of Tierra del Fuego

- Río Grande, Tierra del Fuego
- Ushuaia, Tierra del Fuego

Law 24331: Free Zones (of Argentina)

- Zona Franca Rio Gallegos, Santa Cruz
- Zona Franca La Plata, Buenos Aires
- Zona Franca General Pico, La Pampa Decreto 285/99

=== The Bahamas ===
- Freeport, Grand Bahama

=== Bermuda ===
- Free port of Hamilton Harbour, Hamilton, Bermuda

=== Brazil ===
- Zona Franca de Manaus

=== Canada ===
Foreign trade zones:

- Calgary Region Inland Port
- Cape Breton Regional Municipality
- CentrePort Canada
- Global Transportation Hub Authority
- Halifax Gateway
- Port Alberta
- Quebec City
- Niagara
- Windsor–Essex
- Calgary Region Inland Port - FTZ Point

=== Chile ===
- Iquique
- Punta Arenas

=== Colombia ===
- San Andrés
- Zona Franca
- Zona Franca de Bogota
- Zona Franca del Pacifico
- Zona Franca Palermo

=== Dominican Republic ===
- Mega Port of Punta Caucedo

=== Jamaica ===
- Montego Bay

=== Panama ===
- Colón Free Trade Zone

=== Costa Rica ===
- Zona Franca Saret
- Zona Franca Coyol
- CF Free Zone Park S.R.L
- Zona Franca Metropolitana
- Zona Franca del Este
- Concentrix Free Trade Zone, S.A

=== Uruguay ===
- Carrasco International Airport (Free Airport)
- Zona Franca Colonia
- Zona Franca de Montevideo
- Puerto de Montevideo (Free Port)
- Zona Franca Rivera

=== United States ===
- United States Virgin Islands

=== Venezuela ===
- Free port of Isla Margarita (Puerto Libre de Margarita)
- Free zone of the Paraguaná Peninsula (Zona Franca de la Península de Paraguaná)
- Free zone of Santa Elena de Uairén (Zona Franca de Santa Elena de Uairén)

== See also ==
- Bonded warehouse
- Bonded logistics park
- Duty-free shop
  - List of duty-free shops
- Entrepôt
- Free-trade area
