= Korean Free Economic Zone =

Korea Free Economic Zones (KFEZ; Korean: 대한민국의 경제자유구역) are designated to strengthen national competition for businesses and promote balanced regional development by improving living conditions and business environments for foreigners in South Korea. Korea's economic zone planning office is in charge of this project. The Korean government provides a variety of tax benefits for foreign firms and foreigners, as well as a simpler regulatory regime, a favorable living environment and swift administrative services. KFEZ endeavors to establish economic and social institutions that lead global trends and provide a variety of incentives.

In 2021, Foreign Direct Investment in FEZ upraised 42%, receiving $1.31 billion. Manufacturing sector leads foreign investment, followed by service segment, such as logistics and research and development. The European Union led the investment in the FEZ of South Korea.

== Districts ==
District	Location	Focus Industries	Starting Date	Website
Incheon FEZ	Incheon	IT, BT, international finance, tourism & leisure	August 6, 2003	
Busan/Jinhae FEZ	Busan; South Gyeongsang Province	maritime logistics, shipbuilding	March 30, 2004	
Gwangyang FEZ	South Jeolla Province; South Gyeongsang Province	maritime logistics, materials	March 24, 2004	
Yellow Sea FEZ	South Chungcheong Province; Gyeonggi Province	automobile components, value-added logistics	July 22, 2008	
Saemangeum/Gunsan FEZ	North Jeolla Province	automobiles, shipbuilding, green industries	August 28, 2008	
Daegu/Gyeongbuk FEZ	Daegu; North Gyeongsang Province	education, medical, knowledge-based	August 13, 2008	
Chung Buk FEZ	North Chungcheong Province	tourism, automobile components	April 26, 2013	
East Coast FEZ	Donghae; Gangwon Province	IT components, logistics, tourism	July 9, 2013	
