= Dutch German Church, Livorno =

Church in Livorno, Italy

Coordinates: 43°32′55″N 10°18′45″E

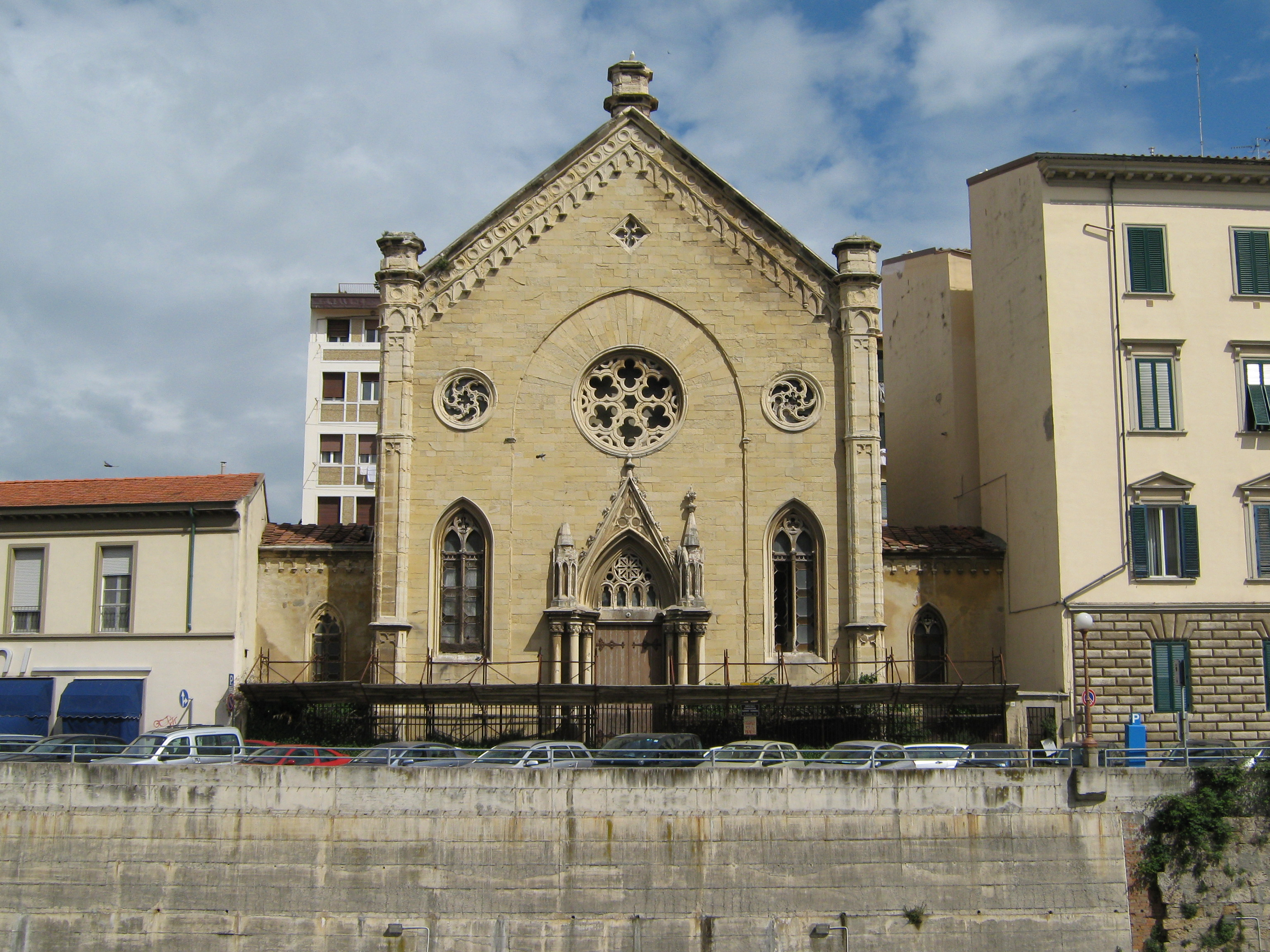
Temple of the Dutch German Congregation, Livorno

The Dutch German Church (It. Tempio della Congregazione Olandese Alemanna, literally Temple of the Dutch German Congregation) in Livorno, Italy, is on the stretch of the Fosso Reale canal that runs between Piazza della Repubblica and Piazza Cavour.

The Protestant church bears witness to the intercultural climate that once reigned in the city of Livorno. Since the second half of the 20th century, however, the church has been closed to the public and practically abandoned, and is now in need of major restoration work. The risk of collapse to which the building is dangerously exposed was already reported in 2005 by the vice president of the consistory of the Congregation, Ennio Weatherford.

== History ==
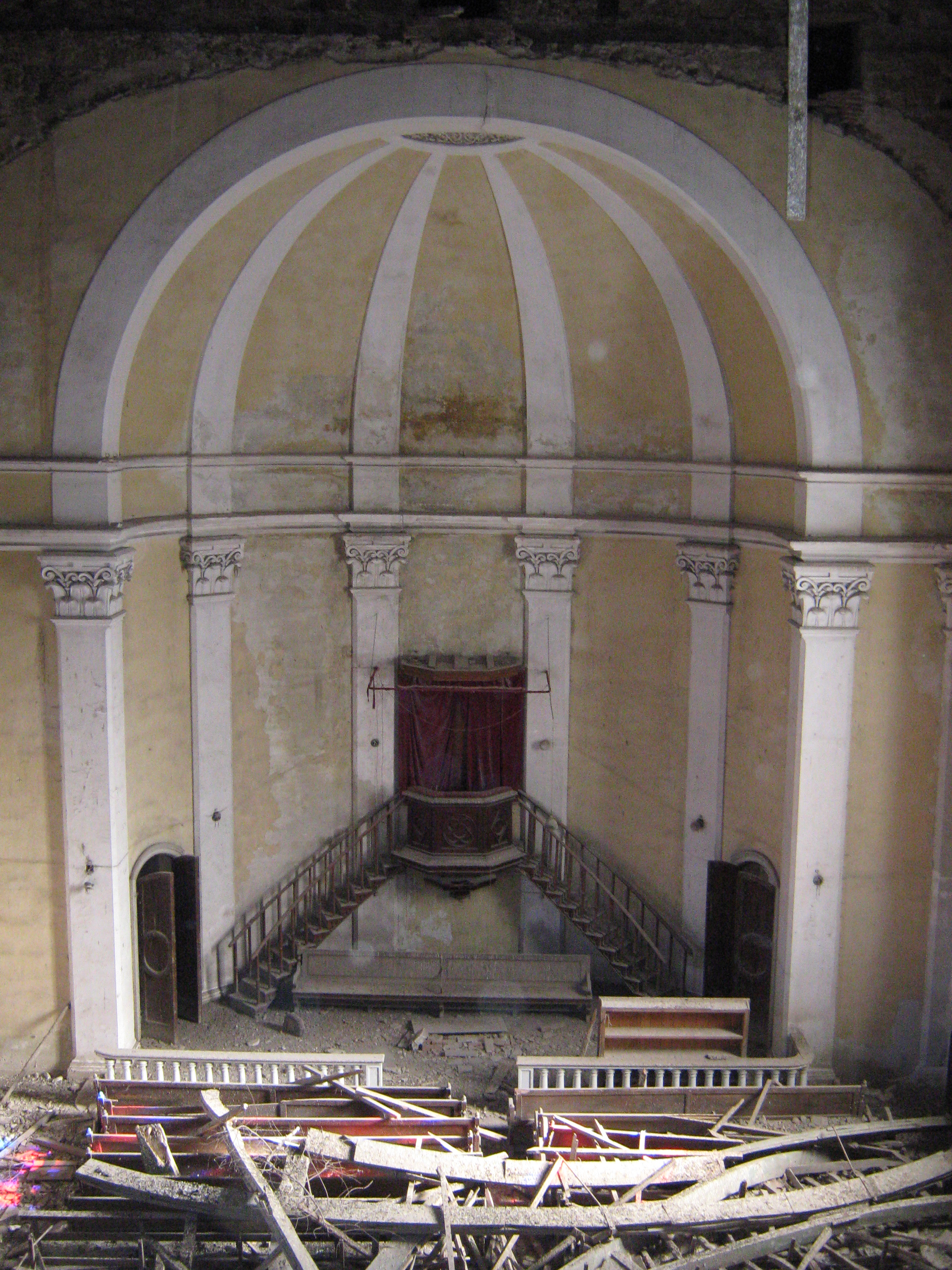
Interior

Flemish and German communities were recorded in Livorno from the origins of the city in the early 17th century when the Dutch German Congregation was established. This association is still active today, although it began its activities again after being reconstituted in 1997. To begin with, the community followed the Catholic faith and had its own altar in the Church of the Madonna, alongside those of the other foreign nations. Subsequently, the Calvinist movement prevailed and a new space was therefore needed for the burial of the community’s deceased and for their religious services. The latter were held in a room in Via del Consiglio. For around forty years, from the end of the 18th to the early 19th century, the pastor serving the community was Giovanni Paolo Schulthesius.

After the Unification of Italy, a contest was announced for the design of an actual church. Among the entrants was Giuseppe Cappellini but the contest was won by Dario Giacomelli: the work began in 1862 and ended in 1864. A few years later, the economic crisis linked to the abolition of Livorno’s Porto Franco status brought about the decline of the congregation which, nevertheless, in 1903 equipped the church with a handsome organ by the Agati-Tronci company, said to be the finest in Tuscany. The building escaped the bombings of the Second World War but was deprived of its organ. After the War, the church, with its excellent acoustics, was used for numerous concerts. At the end of the 1960s it was rented to the Seventh-day Adventist Church for a period of five years.

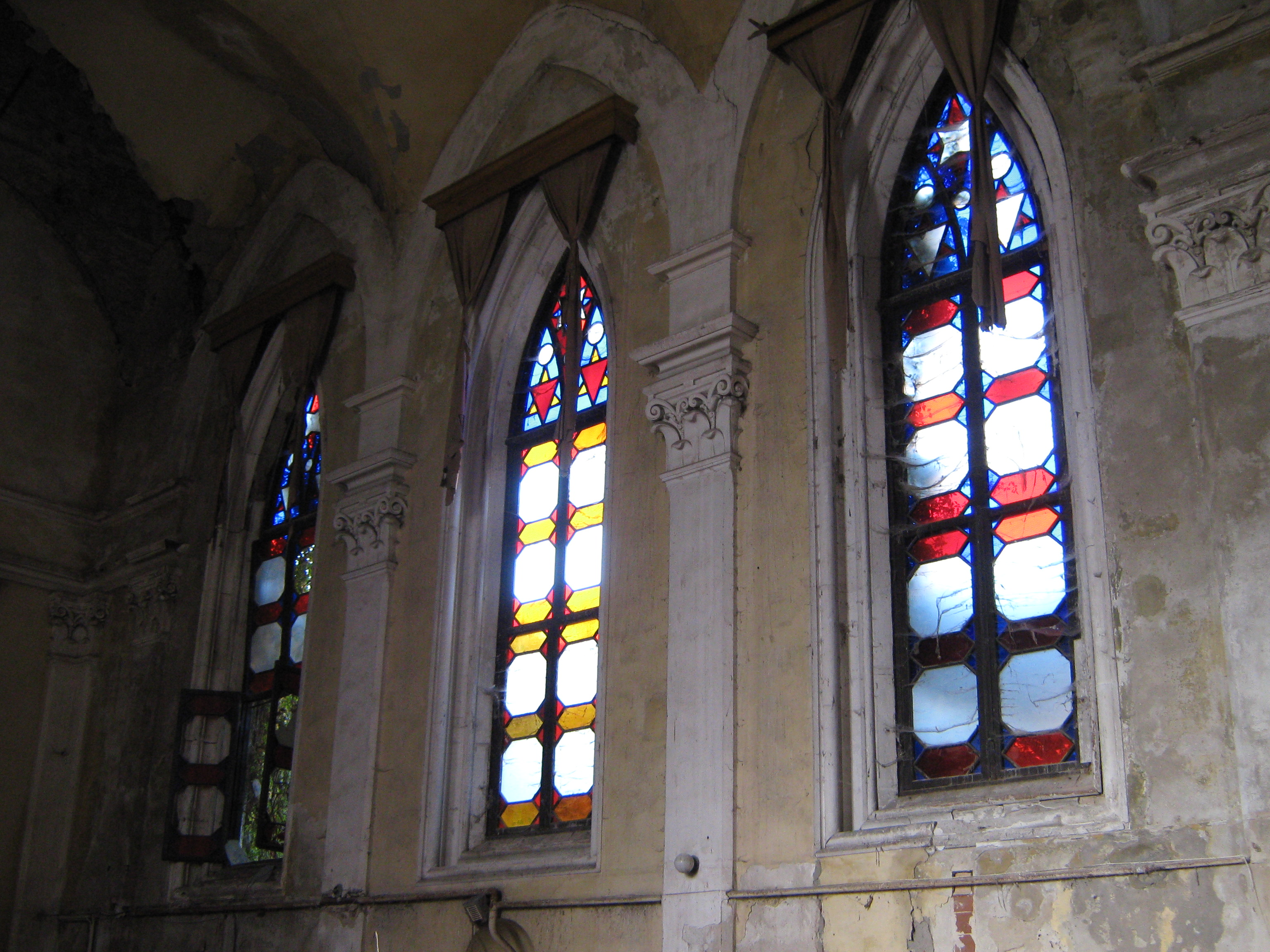
Interior

Following the demise of the last members of the Congregation in the second half of the 20th century, the church gradually fell into a state of decay. Behind the apse, in the area once occupied by the sacristy, the community’s school and the teacher’s accommodation, the construction of a looming apartment building was even authorised. At the same time, the ornamental details of the church began to crumble dangerously, starting with the elegant pinnacles that used to adorn the facade.

At the beginning of the new millennium, following the reconstitution of the Congregation to which the church belongs, some restoration work was carried out to the roof and the windows, but not to the structure as a whole. Today, the interior vault of the counter-ceiling is in a state of semi-collapse, the resulting rubble covering the ancient wooden pews (many from the 18th century); the wooden floor has also collapsed in various points, while numerous elements of stonework have fallen off the facade.

Furthermore, the serious decay of the building is accentuated by the delayed restoration of the retaining wall of the Fosso Reale canal that lies in front of the church. The wall caved in at the end of the 1980s but the raw cement of the incomplete repair work still remains.

== Architecture ==
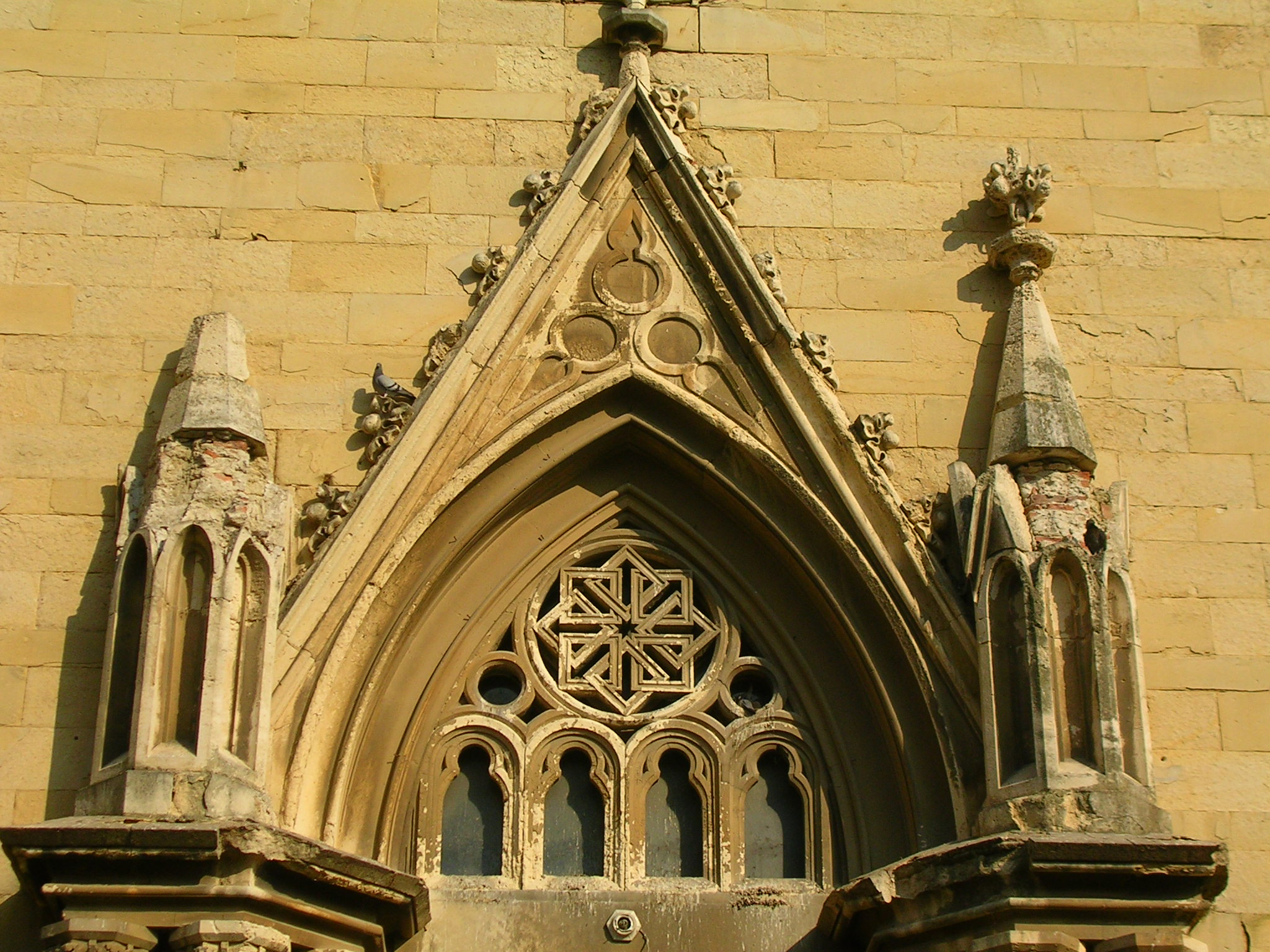
Detail of the precarious state of the facade (2007)

The Dutch German Church is a Neo-Gothic building representing one of few 19th-century constructions in this style in Livorno, and certainly the largest and most important. The crumbling facade bears three geometrically harmonious rose windows: the largest, located in the centre above the doorway, is decorated with floral motifs and is flanked by the other two a Flamboyant style.

The interior consists of a large rectangular nave, preceded by a gallery above the vestibule and enclosed by a large circular apse. Giacomelli combined elements of traditional Gothic architecture with others of a Classical style: the nave contains alternating Classical-style pilasters which support pointed arches framing the ogival windows.

In typical Calvinist style, there is no altar, and the apse contains a pulpit raised high, with steps on either side.

=== Gallery ===
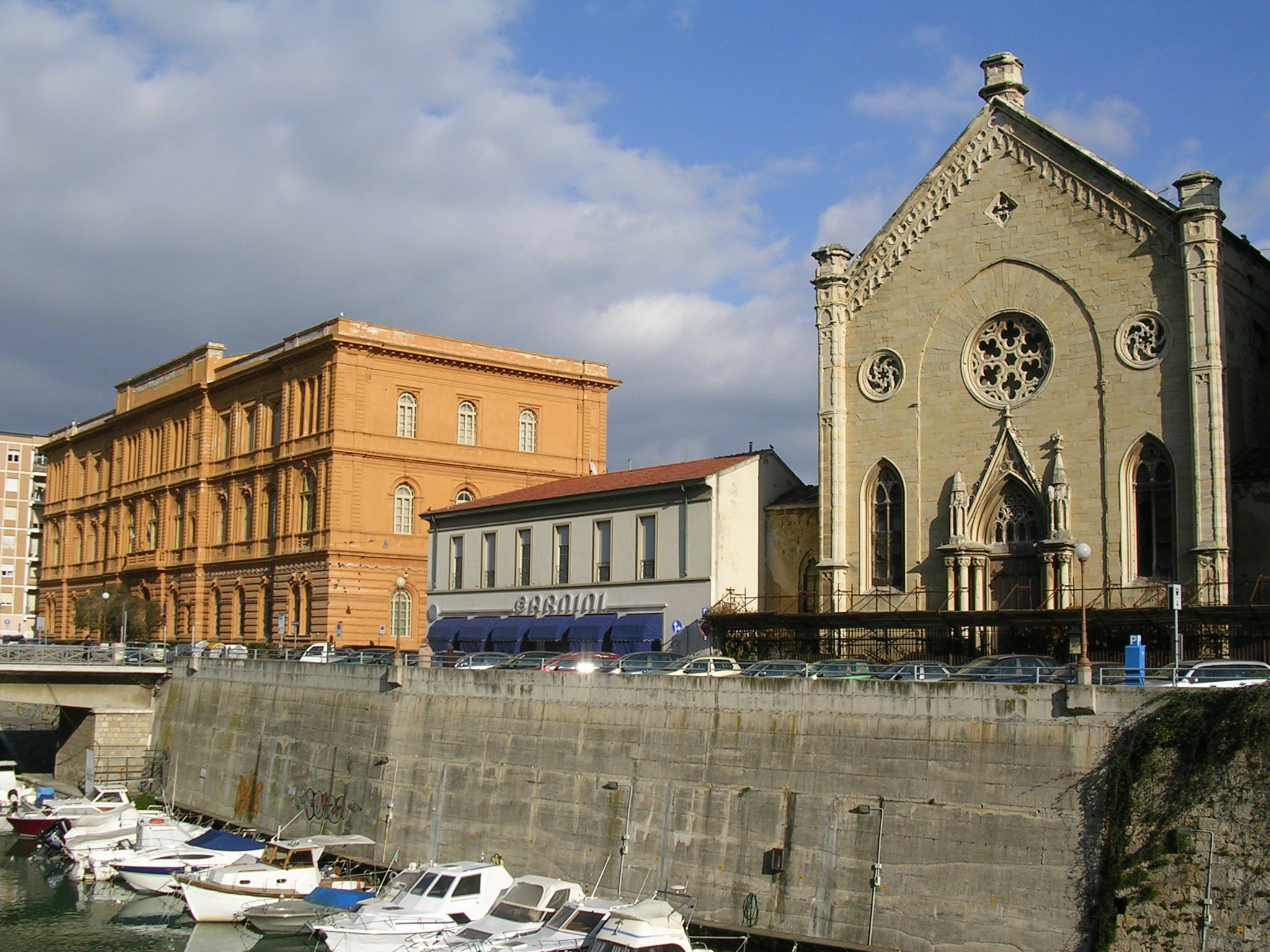
The church and the Fosso Reale, the latter also in need of restoration

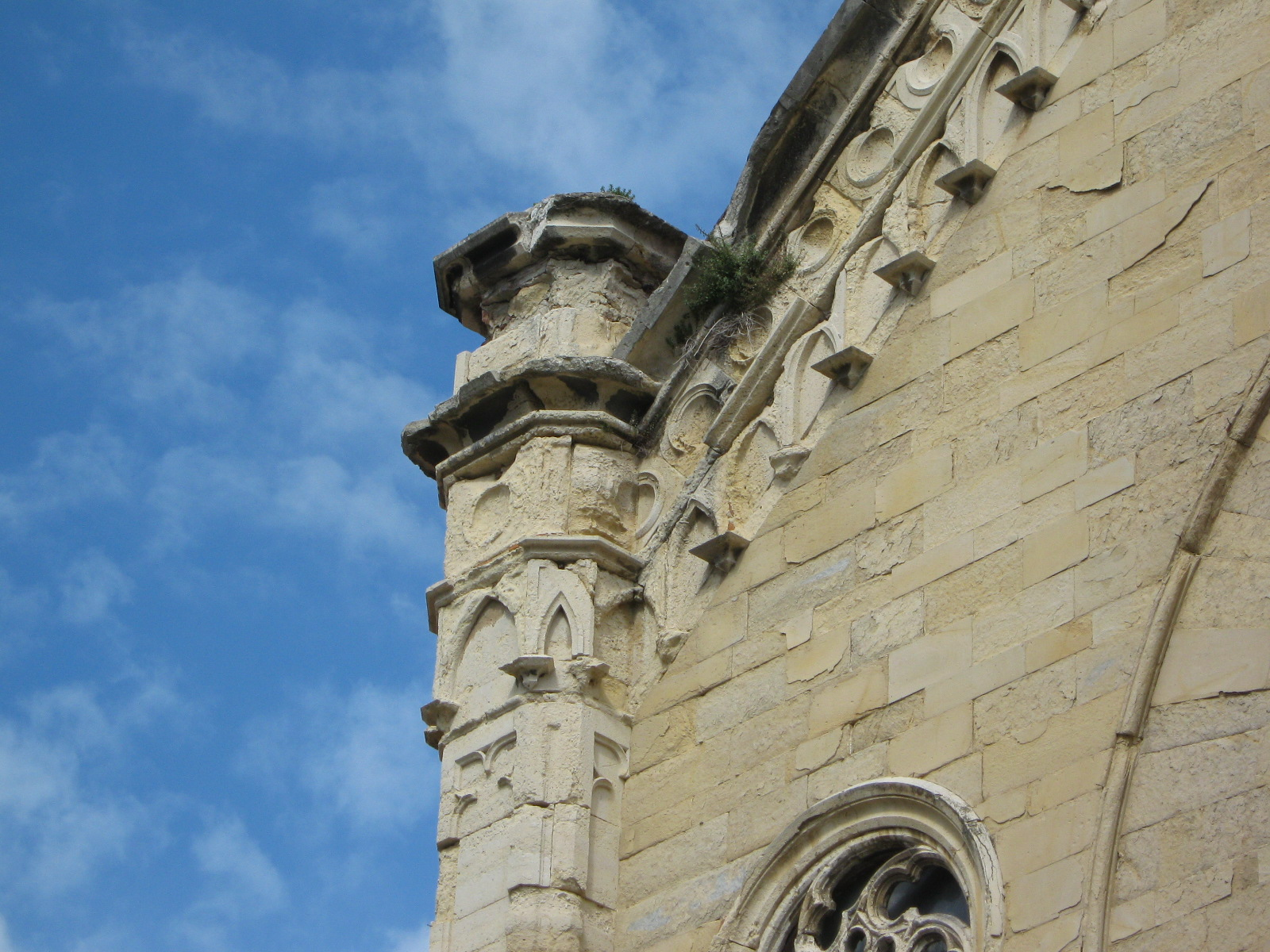
The base of a seriously deteriorated pinnacle

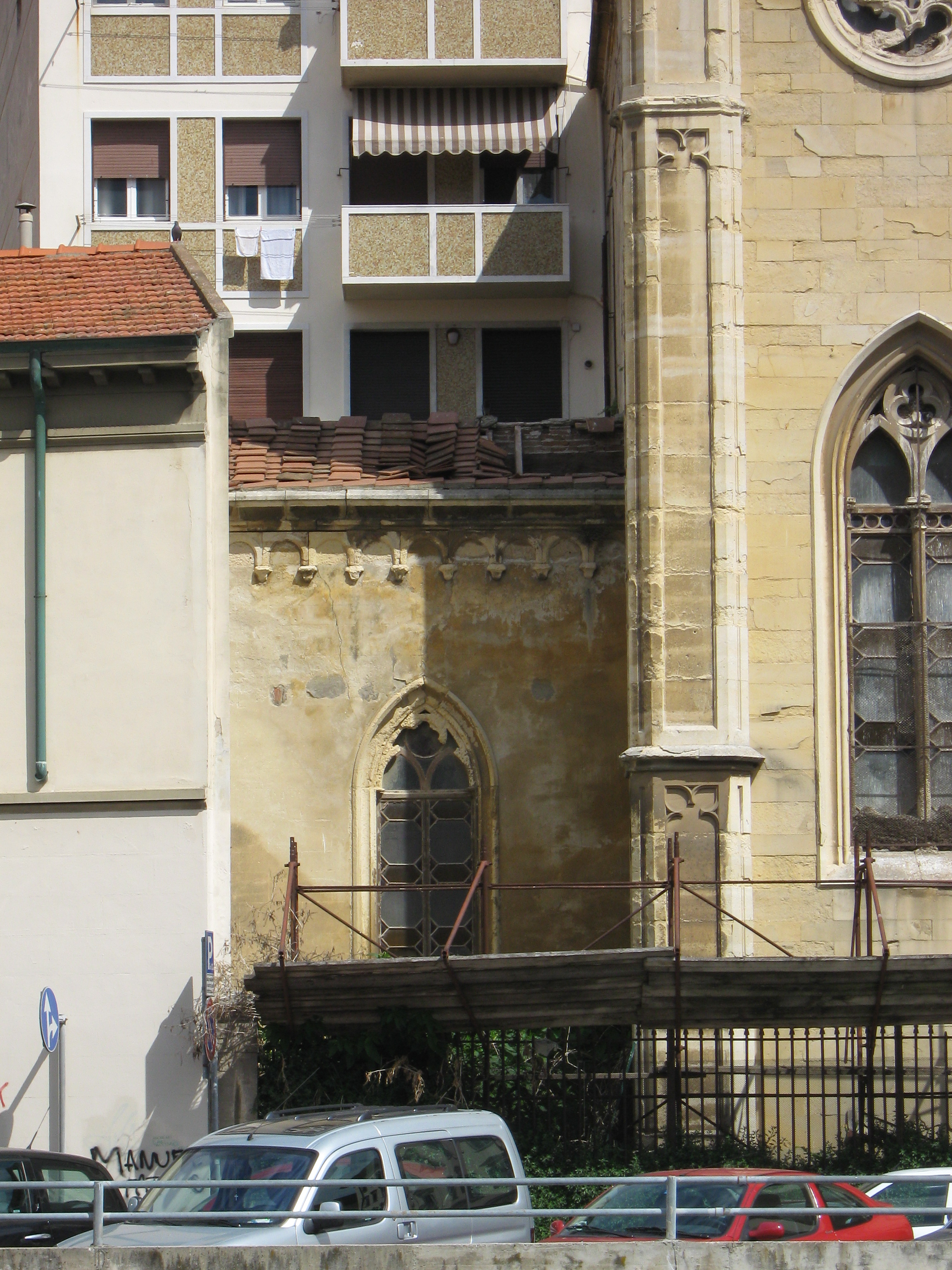
Roof of the side building, which caved in during 2008

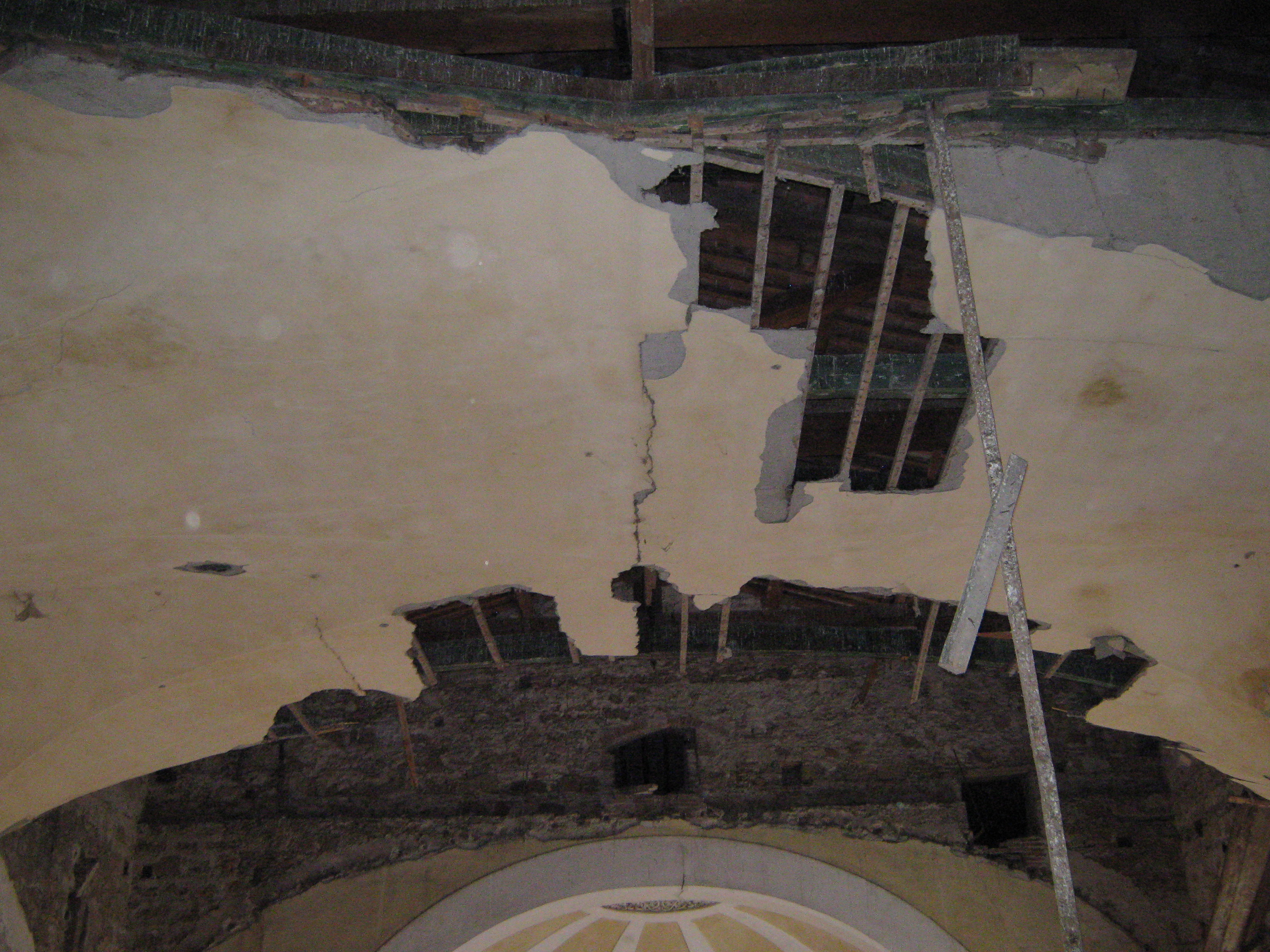
Counter-ceiling above the nave (2010)

== Bibliography ==
- S. Ceccarini, I cimiteri e il tempio della Congregazione Olandese-Alemanna, in "Il Pentagono", ottobre/novembre 2011, p. 4-13.
- G. Panessa, M. Del Nista (a cura di), La Congregazione Olandese-Alemanna. Intercultura e protestantesimo nella Livorno delle Nazioni, Livorno 2002.
- G. Piombanti, Guida storica ed artistica della città e dei dintorni di Livorno, Livorno 1903.
