= Port of Vigo =

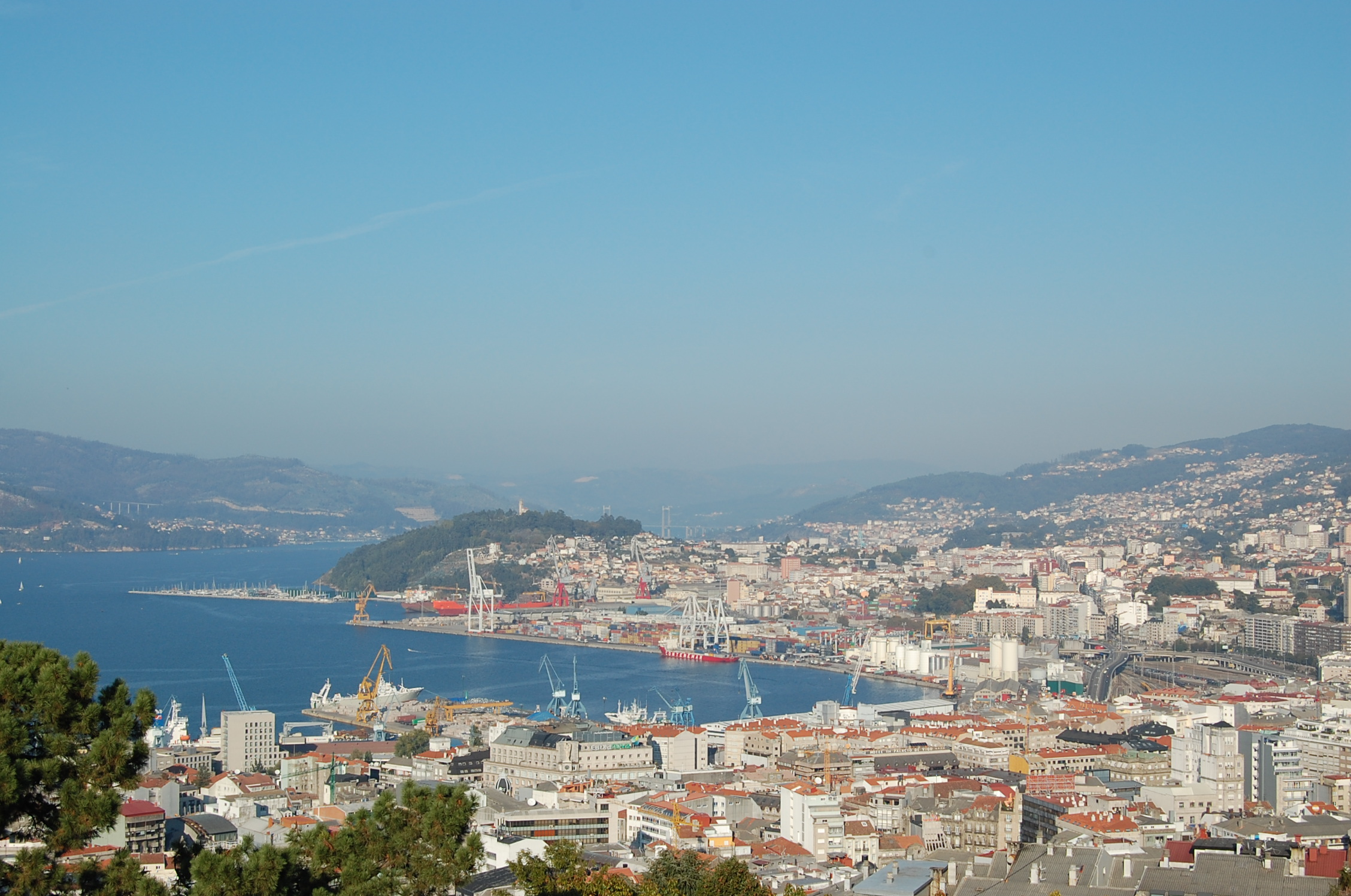
- Click on the map for a fullscreen view

Location
- Country: Spain
- Location: Vigo, Galicia
- Coordinates: 42.237°N 8.733°W
- UN/LOCODE: ESVGO

Details
- Operated by: Autoridad Portuaria de Vigo
- Size of harbour: 14,000 hectares
- President: Ignacio López-Chaves Castro

Statistics
- Passenger traffic: 221,375
- Website www.apvigo.com

Port of Vigo (Galician: Porto de Vigo, Spanish: Puerto de Vigo) is located in Vigo, Pontevedra, Galicia, Spain.

Vigo is the base for the big fishing companies which have prominent presence in countries such as Namibia, South Africa, Mozambique, Australia, Argentina, the Falkland Islands, Chile and Peru, among others. Fish is sent all over Spain and abroad to countries like Portugal, Italy, France and other more distant markets including Asia.

In Vigo, important international trade fairs are held, like Conxemar, an annual event dedicated to frozen fish products. "Navalia Shipbuilding Exhibition" takes place every second year.

== History ==
The shipbuilding tradition begins in to the early Twentieth century, with the appearance of the first small steam fishing boats. One of these early models, known as the “Vigo type steamer” was very popular all around the coast of Spain and North Africa. Hundreds of this type were built.

Another decisive moment of development was in the 1960s, when the new freezer trawlers, which revolutionised the fishing industry, were first built. Vigo shipyards have always been leaders in the field of fishing vessels and a constant point of reference.

== Parts ==
In order from south to north:

- Bouzas: divided between ro-ro traffic and shipyards for the repair of vessels.
- Beiramar and O Berbés: for fishing vessels.
- Transatlantic dock.
- Marina dock for yachts (these last three are by the city center).
- O Areal: commercial general and fluid goods freighting, 1500 meters long with a railway connection.
- Guixar: for handling containers, 769 meters long with a railway connection.

Beyond this point, shipyards and fishing ships docks could be found (Pescanova dock among them).

The Port of Vigo is involved in the construction of a Logistics Platform (PLISAN), that is supposed to conform a multifunctional complex spread over 419 ha and it is located 35 km away from Vigo.

== See also ==
- European Fisheries Control Agency
- Pescanova
- Vigo Free Trade Zone Consortium
