= Bonded logistics park =

Type of special economic zone

A bonded logistics park is a type of special economic zone. Trade arrangements are similar to that of a bonded warehouse but over a specific geographic area. Sometimes with international port capabilities. Goods may be stored, manipulated, or undergo manufacturing operations without payment of duty.

== China ==
China’s bonded logistic parks have similar rules to free-trade zones (another specific type of special economic zone) except for export VAT refund. Export VAT refund is eligible for a Chinese company once their goods enter the park.

=== Locations ===
- Zhangjiagang Bonded Logistics Park, Jiangsu province
- Yantian Port Bonded Logistics Park, Guangdong province

== See also ==
- Entrepôt
- Free economic zone
- Free-trade zone
- List of free economic zones
