= Chung Buk Free Economic Zone =

Free Economic Zone in Chungcheongbuk-do, South Korea

The Chungbuk Free Economic Zone (CBFEZ) is a Free Economic Zone in Chungcheongbuk-do, South Korea. It includes the cities of Chungju and Cheongju. The zone was announced on February 14, 2013.

== Location ==
Chungbuk Free Economic Zone is a central transport hub in South Korea. Cheongju International Airport is located there.

== Investment Incentives ==
Chungbuk is one of eight Free Economic Zones established to attract foreign investment. The Korean government has created investment incentives such as tax breaks for foreign companies, relaxed labor regulations and investment subsidies. The Korean government describes CBFEZ as having "the most optimized access to the nation". The entire country is within 2 hours by train.

== Projects ==
The Chungbuk Free Economic Zone includes three core investment projects: "Bio Valley", "Aeropolis" and "Ecopolis".

=== Bio Valley ===
Bio Valley is intended to attract investment in biotechnological, pharmaceutical and medical research. Related government agencies are located there, and plans have been made to establish a university specializing in biotechnology research.

- Location: Near Osong-eup, Cheongwon-gun, Chungcheong Buk-do (near Osong KTX Station)
- Area: 4,414,898 m^{2}
- Project Cost: 1.888 trillion KRW
- Project Period: 2013~2020

=== Aeropolis ===
Aeropolis is intended to focus on airplane manufacture and maintenance, as well as aeronautical research. The first priority is the construction of a maintenance, repair and overhaul complex for the airport.

- Location: Naesu-eup, Cheongwon-gun, Chungcheong Buk-do
- Area: 473,713 m^{2}
- Project Cost: 1,569 billion KRW
- Project Period: 2013~2020

=== Ecopolis ===
Ecopolis is focused on environmentally benign economic development, including an eco-friendly resort. Over US $25 million in tax subsidies have been promised for investors.

- Location: Gageum-myeon, Chungju City, Chungcheong Buk-do
- Area: 4,196,416 m^{2}
- Project Cost: 659.1 billion KRW
- Project Period: 2013~2020

== See also ==
- Free economic zone
- Foreign direct investment
