= East Coast Free Economic Zone =

The Korean East Coast Free Economic Zone or East Coast FEZ is a 4.47 km^{2} economic zone on development, located in the Gangwon-do's East Coast area into the center of the Pan-East Coast economic belt. The FEZ is focused on advanced green materials industries, global tourism, and leisure industries.

In 2013, The Ministry of Trade, Industry and Energy of Korea launched the development plan. The total cost of the project has been 807.05 billion won and is aimed to be built between 2013 and 2024.

The East Coast FEZ is composed by three districts in the East Coast Port Area: Guho-dong and Mangsang-dong of Donghae_si, Okgye-myeon of Gangneung_si.

== Investments ==
In 2021, the East Coast received $100 million in Foreign Direct Investment. In January 2022, the chairman of the Philippines' LCS Group Luis Chavit Singson announced a $100 million investment plan in a residential, commercial, and resort development project in the Mangsang District 1, highlighting its geographically and strategically location on the coastline.

== See also ==
- Free Economic Zone
- Free trade agreements of South Korea
- List of free economic zones
