= Vigo Free Trade Zone Consortium =

Vigo Free Trade Consortium is a public institution that has been working since 1947 to encourage international trade and economic development in southern Galicia. From its logistical area, located in the port of Vigo, the consortium oversees a free trade zone with all of its related importation and exportation advantages. As an economic development agency, the consortium is the main developer of business parks in its area of influence. It also provides companies with a whole range of services including: finance, via the capital risk company Vigo Activo; support for entrepreneurs, via business initiative centres and collaboration with the University of Vigo in the form of seed funding; plus financial information required for decision making, via the Ardan business information service.

Some 350 companies currently occupy the different parks developed by the Consortium. In 2010 the Free Trade Zone parks network generated 26.57% of the total wealth of the Vigo Metropolitan Area and 25.56% of all employment in the region. The consortium is currently involved in extending the almost 5 million square metres of land offered and managed in the business parks of Balaídos, Bouzas, A Granxa, Parque Tecnolóxico e Loxístico (PTL) and Porto do Molle, via the new Salvaterra-As Neves Logistic and Industrial Platform (PLISAN) and a new Business park in Vigo.

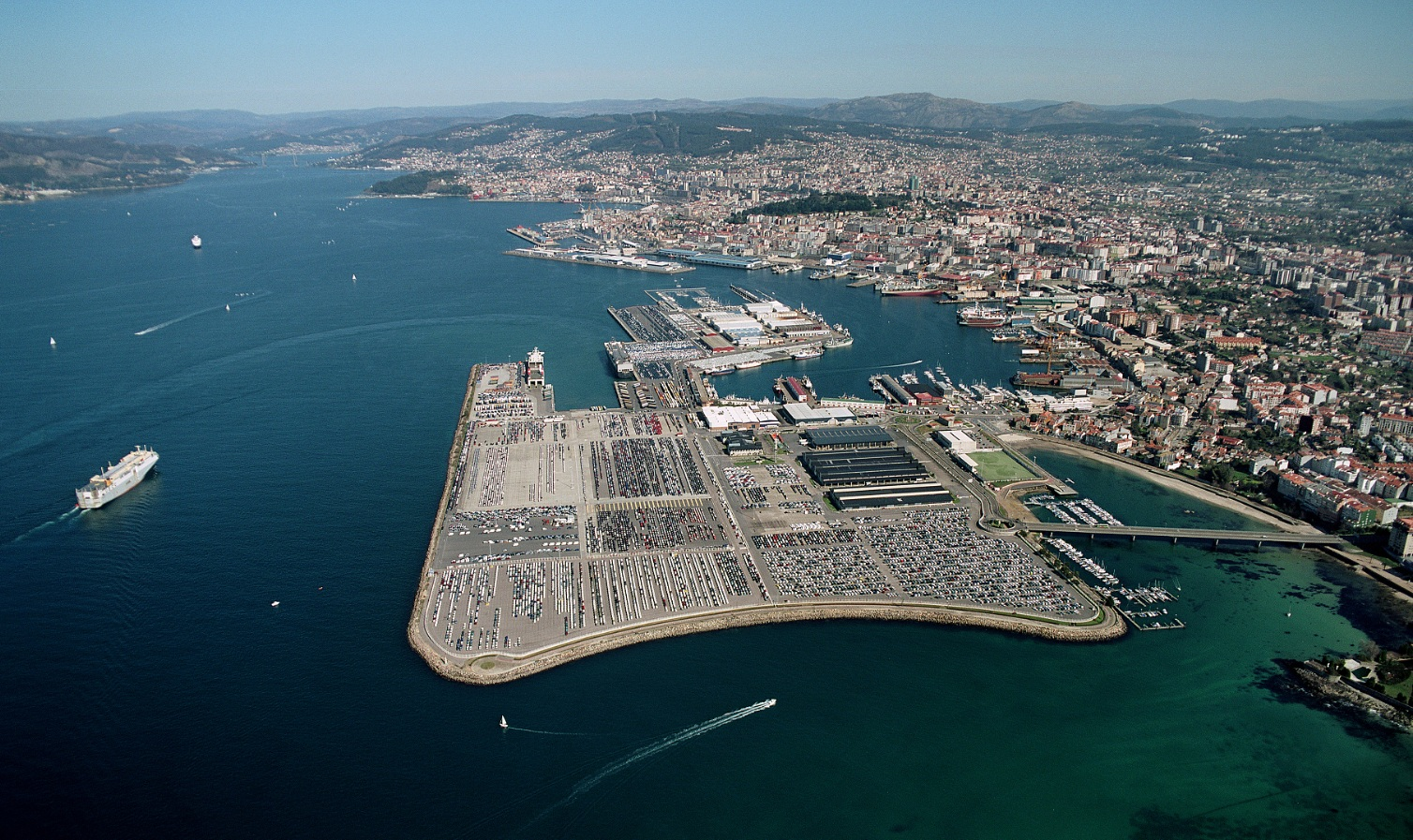
Free Trade and Consortium headquarters view in the Ria de Vigo

The consortium is formed by entities such as Vigo City Council, Pontevedra Provincial Council, the Chamber of Commerce, the Harbour Authority and the Spanish State; with the Spanish Cabinet responsible for appointing the Special State Representative proposed by the Department of the Treasury.

The current State Representative, Teresa Pedrosa, presides over the monthly meetings of the executive committee, the body responsible for the management, administration and running of this public institution. The Vigo Mayor's Office is responsible for the chairmanship of the Consortium.

== State representatives ==
Names and dates of the appointment of state representatives in the Vigo Free Trade Zone Consortium:

- Rafael Portanet Suárez: 22/09/1947.
- Fernando Alonso Amat: 26/06/1978.
- Francisco López Peña: 27/01/1989.
- Pablo Egerique Martínez: 12/07/1996.
- Francisco López Peña: 7/06/2004.
- María Teresa Pisano Avello: 30/05/2008.
- Teresa Pedrosa Silva: 10/02/2012.

== History ==
A major part of Vigo's development has been due to the activities of the Free Trade Zone. The Consortium developed the Balaídos Industrial Estate, where a Citroën Hispania factory was established in the Fifties, which led to the growth of an important car sector in Vigo. It was also responsible for the development of the Valadares Technological Park and the other main operations involving industrial land in the city and surrounding areas, as well as a large urban restoration project, Abrir Vigo al Mar (“Opening Vigo to the sea”). The Consortium established the Galician Sea Museum, which once finished was transferred back to the Galician Regional Government. During its fifty plus years of existence the consortium has played a role of ever-growing importance in the city's financial framework and also in infrastructures, urban planning and support for the entire business process - from entrepreneurs to firmly established industry.

=== Origins ===
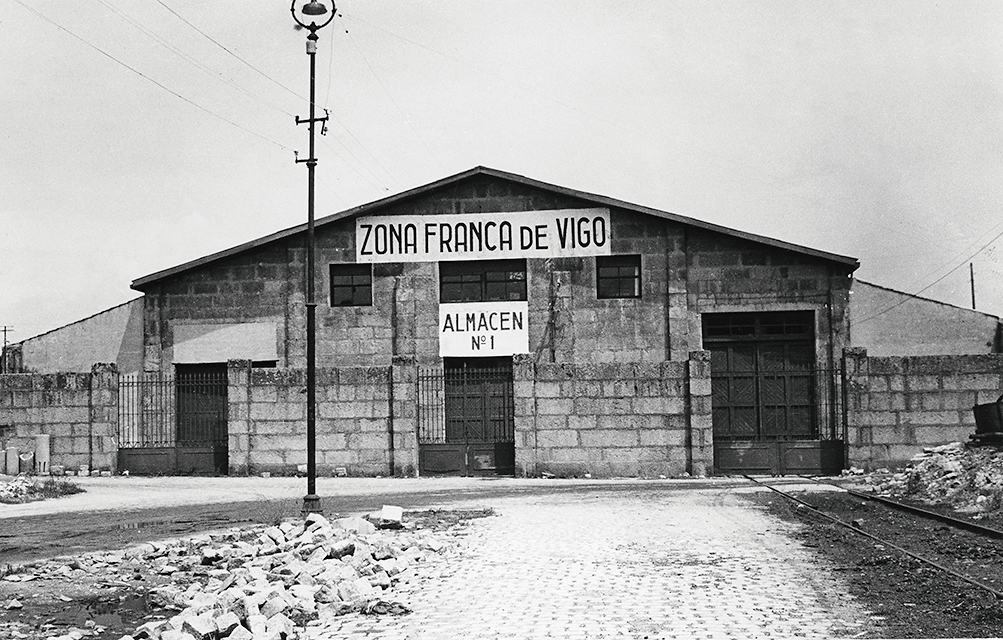
Consortium's first store in the Port of Vigo

In 1947, when the decree by which the Spanish Government granted Vigo the right to establish the third Free Trade Zone in Spain (after Barcelona and Cadiz) was published in the State Official Gazette, this news was welcomed with great enthusiasm by local authorities and business organisations, who rightly realised that the advantages this offered in comparison to other cities would drive the economic growth of Vigo.

As Francisco López Peña, State Representative on two separate occasions, explained to University of Vigo students, “When the Free Trade Zone was created, Spain was still in a state of complete self-sufficiency with a completely closed economy. The prohibition on importations had been a huge mistake. Indeed, instead of protecting the country's industry, it resulted in industrial processes being more expensive and effectively prevented the economy from becoming specialised and competitive. However, the Free Trade Zone, allowed companies to be established that took full advantage of the availability of cheap imports and the possibilities for exports. It was a highly significant step for the city, a comparative advantage that permitted the city’s economic expansion”.

Nevertheless, some years would have to pass before the promising expectations generated by the authorisation to establish the Free Trade Zone were fulfilled. The Consortium responsible for its operation and administration was presided over by Vigo City Council and included a State Representative and several municipal councillors and representatives from public entities. It had to present a plan to the Cabinet for the delimitation of the Free Trade Zone, so its members debated for some time about the correct direction required for the project: industrial or commercial. Rafael Portanet, the first State Representative for the Consortium, preferred the former option, given that the driving of industrial development was an urgent requirement at that time.

As Juan José Vázquez-Portomeñe indicated in his book Los consorcios administradores de zonas francas. El Consorcio de la Zona Franca de Vigo (“Free Trade Zone Administrative Consortiums: Vigo Free Trade Zone Consortium”): “The debate ended with an apparent compromise, as the project presented by the Consortium for approval by the Government included both an industrial and commercial area. However, over the long run, the industrial option took precedence, and the commercial area that had been initially planned failed to materialise.”

The initial project included the construction of a harbour in Alcabre on land recovered from the sea, which would even include oil refinery installations. But as the huge technical and financial requirements involved in the realisation of this plan became apparent the project was restricted to an area of some 650,000 square metres in Balaídos, sufficient space to meet the requests for land presented by several companies. This decision was taken due to the threat of expiry of the initial authorisation for the creation of the Free Trade Zone.

In order to acquire the land in Balaídos, around two thousand small plots had to be bought using compulsory purchase orders. However, at that time the Consortium only had a state grant of one and a half million pesetas, insufficient to cover the cost of the purchases. In the end, a loan of thirteen million pesetas from Caja de Ahorros de Vigo (the local savings bank) allowed the Free Trade Zone to start its operations.

Aluminium and ferroalloy companies and, above all, Citroën Hispania, were first to take full advantage of the tax incentives offered by the Free Trade Zone and effectively determined its industrial orientation. In 1956, the decision by the French car manufacturer to establish operations in Vigo was a crucial moment, not just because its activity would become the main source of the financial resources that have allowed the Consortium to adopt its current role as an institution for economic development, but also because it resulted in the appearance of a new industrial sector in the city that, over time, drove the creation of an important network of auxiliary companies for the car industry. The current Car Cluster not only provides parts and components for the PSA factory in Vigo, but is also a supplier for other car manufacturers and attracts multinational companies to Vigo.

=== EU Regulations ===
The entry of Spain into the EU in 1986 brought about a radical alteration in the configuration of the Free Trade Zone. On the one hand, Spain had to adopt EU legislation, which does not consider Free Trade Zones to be industrial in nature, but rather points of entry for products from third countries free from taxes or duties, and on the other hand, the country's economy became entirely open, functioning with a series of different parameters.

Given these new events, which resulted in the loss of the Free Trade Zone's industrial character, the Consortium had to reconsider the function of the Free Trade Zone. At this point a decision was taken to create a commercial area in the harbour for services, logistics, storage of goods and support for international traffic. However, it was also the moment to use accumulated equity to continue driving the economic growth of Vigo and to commence other kinds of activities. The Free Trade Zone would rapidly become a local development agency.

=== Economic development agency ===
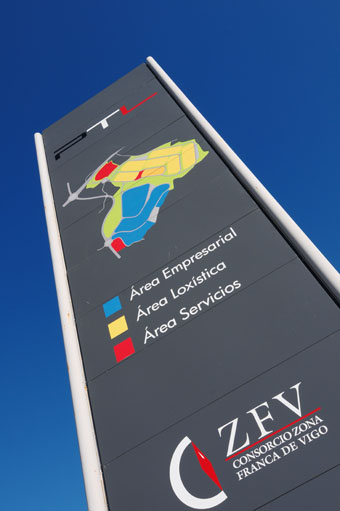
Technology and Logistics Park of Vigo Entrance

From 1989 onwards the strictly commercial activities of the Free Trade Zone started to move towards the new harbour area of Bouzas, where the Consortium had obtained authorisation from the Harbour Authority for the use of an area of 144,352 square metres in exchange for agreeing to create the infrastructures required to finish the space reclaimed from the sea. During the following decade all of the installations were occupied, and by the year 2000 the area had to be extended to the current 200,000 square metres with facilities for covered and open-air storage of goods with its own customs office. The Consortium's central offices were also transferred to Bouzas.

Some forty companies are currently present in this space, and enjoy the infrastructures, services and tax advantages offered to them for the storage and distribution of goods. As the Consortium's promotional publications affirm, Bouzas Commercial Area has become the “Atlantic gateway” for southern Europe.

Nevertheless, more than its commercial activities, the role of the Free Trade Zone Consortium as a development agency has transformed the Consortium into the true driving force behind Vigo and its greater metropolitan area. In this regard, the creation of business parks and the provision of industrial land to all classes of companies became its principal activity, as a huge demand for land in Vigo was obstructing the progress of the city. Having realised that Vigo's economic growth was less than its potential, the Consortium felt that the provision of publicly developed land with a full range of services was of supreme importance.

The first industrial estate created by the Consortium, without having the status of a Free Trade Zone, was the A Granxa estate located in the town of O Porriño. Inaugurated in 1996, the estate generated some three thousand new jobs in the Vigo area. From that time to the present day, the Consortium has acted as property developer, in conjunction with the towns where the land is located, for millions of square metres of business land, fully equipped and strategically situated in the greater metropolitan area.

The next project was the creation of Vigo Technological and Logistic Park, home to initiatives of such interest as Texvigo, a cooperative of textile micro-enterprises which share R&D and marketing processes. The park currently has some seventy companies, including the Japanese multinational company Denso and the German multinational Benteler, creating approximately three thousand five hundred jobs.

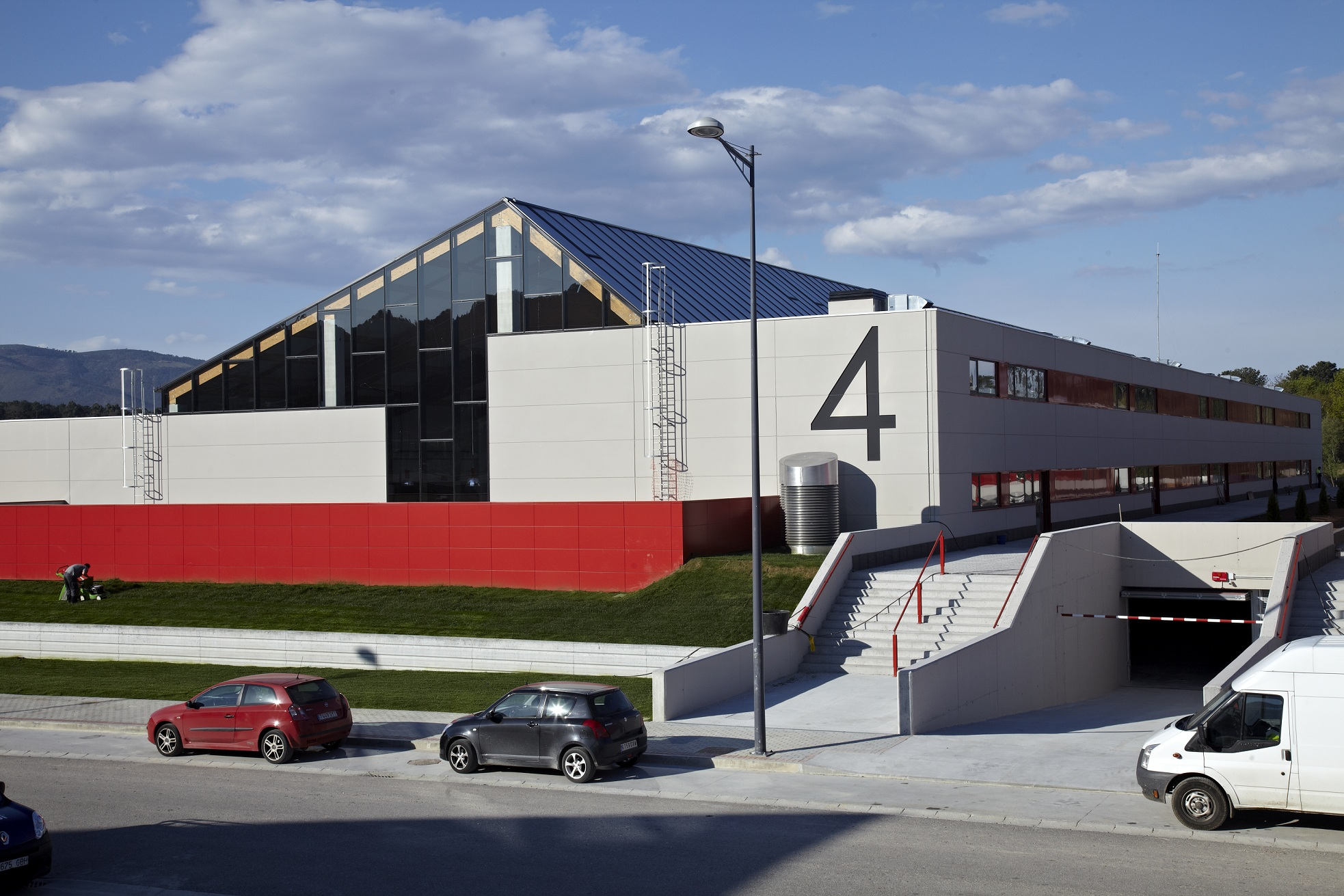
Bioclimatic premises in Porto do Molle Business Park

In the town of Nigrán, the “Porto do Molle” business park, with a surface area of more than one million square metres, offers more land for businesses. Porto do Molle has been designed as a working city, where an individual can work, do sports, shop, stroll and take his/her children to school.

In addition, between the towns of Salvaterra and As Neves, on the border with Portugal, a logistical and industrial platform is planned, which will be the largest business park in the Euroregion, although its entry into operation is currently being delayed due to a series of lawsuits initiated by the former owners of the land in question. Between the areas of Matamá, Valadares and San Andrés de Comesaña the Consortium is designing the last business park to be built in Vigo.

As for the Free Trade Zone business parks, we must not overlook the first of these, the Balaídos Industrial Area, which, covering approximately one million square metres of land, is the largest industrial estate in the city. The powerful Galician Car Cluster has been created around the PSA Peugeot-Citroën plant in Balaidos, providing jobs for more than forty thousand people.

=== Free Trade Zone park network ===
In order to drive the city's economic growth, the Consortium has created the Free Trade Zone park network which provides all companies operating under the auspices of the Consortium with infrastructures, training, information and capital. These services are provided via different companies which collaborate with the Vigo companies.

The Business Initiatives Centre (CIE) is a company incubator which encourages new projects. Located in the A Granxa industrial estate, the CIE has a physical structure where, for a limited period, entrepreneurs have easy access to all which is required to set up new companies in terms of both office space and industrial buildings. The CIE cooperates with entrepreneurs, analysing their company plans, providing advice in seeking out markets, offering continuous training courses, and providing assistance in the search for official subsidies. Due to the high survival rate of 90 per cent for companies started in the CIE, another CIE is currently being built in the Porto do Molle business park.

In relation to the Consortium's policy for supporting the set-up of new companies, its stake in Vigo Activo, a venture capital company, is also worthy of note. The objective of this company is to encourage the creation of small and medium enterprises that are not quoted on the stock market and which are not financial or property development companies. They have to be Galician companies which offer an innovative product or service and have a high potential for growth and profitability.

Moreover, via the ARDAN business database, which is the largest business database in Galicia, the Consortium offers financial information services that allow company managers to gain in-depth information about their environment, keep an eye on their competitors, and identify their position in their sector.

This series of business services is formed by added value projects that offer a differentiating element in Vigo's economy in comparison to other cities.

=== Other initiatives ===
In the Nineties the Consortium decided to take advantage of its experience in purchasing land and the significant funds at its disposal and established a series of agreements with the City Council, the Harbour Authority and the Galician Regional Government in order to implement a project for the urban recuperation of Vigo's central harbour area, known as "Abrir Vigo al Mar (opening Vigo to the sea)". The port area was at this time a poor, run-down area which created a barrier between the city and the sea. In order to modify this situation surface road traffic had to be eliminated using tunnels and a series of garden, leisure and shopping areas had to be created. The project for the recovery of the sea-front was placed in the hands of prestigious architects and received several international urban design awards.

Other Free Trade Zone initiatives have included the construction of the Bouzas Promenade, the public car-park facilities in the Estela and O Berbés squares, and the A Laxe shopping centre. The company Aparcamientos Subterráneos de Vigo S.L. was established, and fully financed by the Consortium, in order to manage the shopping centre and car parks. The Consortium has also participated in the project to restore the city's old quarter.

Without any doubt, the Museum of the Sea is the initiative which seems to fit the least with a body operating under the auspices of the Ministry of the Treasury. The architects Aldo Rossi and César Portela were responsible for the project. Inaugurated in 2002 with a magnificent exhibition about the Rande Battle, once the works were finished and the Museum entered into operation, the Consortium withdrew from its administration and negotiated its transfer to the Galician Regional Government.

== Publications ==
- J.J. Vázquez-Portomeñe. “Los consorcios administradores de zonas francas. El Consorcio de la Zona Franca de Vigo”. ISBN 84-95458-96-9
- J. Lebracón Nieto. “El Consorcio de la Zona Franca de Vigo. Industria, comercio y desarrollo urbano”. ISBN 978-84-87887-81-9
