= Bonded warehouse =

Building or other secured area in which dutiable goods may be stored

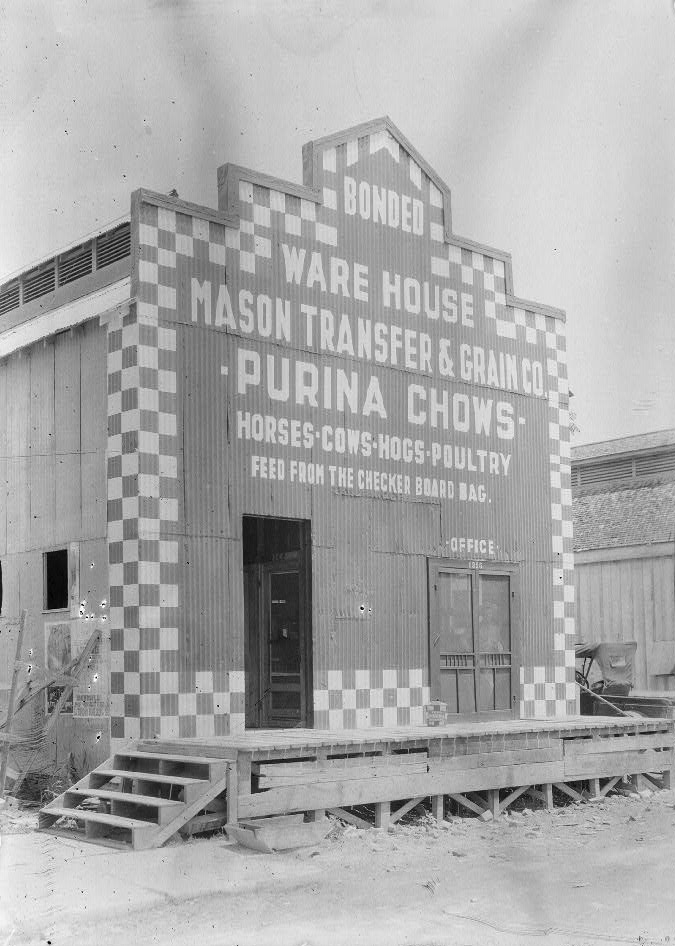
Mason Transfer and Grain Co., bonded warehouse on the South Texas Border. Taken by Robert Runyon sometime between 1900 and 1920.

A bonded warehouse, or bond, is a building or other secured area in which imported but dutiable goods may be stored, manipulated, or undergo manufacturing operations without payment of duty. They may then be again exported without payment of duty. It may be managed by the state or by private enterprise. In the latter case a customs bond must be posted with the government. This system is widely used in developed countries throughout the world.

== Overview ==
Upon entry of goods into the warehouse, the importer and warehouse proprietor incur liability under a bond. This liability is generally cancelled when the goods are:

- exported or deemed exported
- withdrawn for supplies to a vessel or aircraft in international traffic
- destroyed under Customs supervision
- withdrawn for consumption domestically after payment of duty

While the goods are in the bonded warehouse, they may, under supervision by the customs authority, be manipulated by cleaning, sorting, repacking, or otherwise changing their condition by processes that do not amount to manufacturing. After manipulation, and within the warehousing period, the goods may be exported without the payment of duty, or they may be withdrawn for consumption upon payment of duty at the rate applicable to the goods in their manipulated condition at the time of withdrawal. In the United States, goods may remain in the bonded warehouse up to five years from the date of importation. Bonded warehouses provide specialized storage services such as deep freeze or bulk liquid storage, commodity processing, and coordination with transportation, and are an integral part of the global supply chain.

== Types ==
Depending on the country or region, there are various options for the storage of goods in a bonded warehouse.

=== Temporary storage premises (RTO) ===
Temporary storage premises offer the possibility of storing goods that enter the customs territory of the EU awaiting further customs-approved use or treatment.

=== Type B customs warehouse ===
The type B customs warehouse is a public customs warehouse. This means that the administrator (warehouse keeper) can make the premises available to anyone that wants to store goods under customs control. It is also known as Public Customs Bonded Warehouses. Examples of type B customs warehouse in Asian countries include Central Warehousing Corporation, Concor, State Warehousing Corporation, DHL Public Bonded Warehouses, Contegrate Entrepot Public Bonded Warehouses, and Allcargo Custom Bonded Warehouses. Type B warehouses are licensed by the concerned customs authorities to act as custodian and escrow to store goods until duty is paid by the importers.

=== Type C customs warehouse ===
A Type C customs warehouse is a private customs warehouse operated by a warehouse keeper. The warehouse keeper may store their own goods or goods belonging to other parties and remains responsible to customs for the goods held in the warehouse. This responsibility includes providing the required security to customs authorities. Type C warehouses are generally associated with specific licensed operators or importers, and access to the facility may be restricted according to the applicable customs authorisation. They are also commonly referred to as private bonded warehouses.

=== Type D and E customs warehouses ===
Type D and E customs warehouses are private customs warehouses, which means that only the administrator (warehouse keeper) is allowed to store goods in them.

=== Free warehouse ===
A Public Bonded Warehouse is a building or premises guarded and locked by customs. Anyone can store goods within this building or premises.

=== Special economic zone or Free zone ===
Unlike a free warehouse, a special economic zone is not a building or premises, but a location which has been carefully charted and recorded. Sometimes these areas are known as bonded logistics parks.

=== Implementation ===
Depending on different countries, it is difficult to choose what kind of warehouse should be chosen for different situations, for example, goods may be entered for temporary warehouse and afterwards for local consumption or they may be transported outbound to another country and placed in a warehouse or entered into a warehouse waiting for retailers to transfer them.

Under such complex circumstances, many importers and exporters try to use automation to help manage issues in bonded warehouse which, to some extent, can respond rapidly to customer orders and dispatch products.

=== Aircraft and Ship stores ===
Bonded store is place where they place those items which are not declared either serviceable or un-serviceable.

== History ==
Previous to the establishment of bonded warehouses in England the payment of duties on imported goods had to be made at the time of importation, or a bond with security for future payment given to the revenue authorities. The inconveniences of this system were many:

- It was not always possible for the importer to find sureties, and he had often to make an immediate sale of the goods, in order to raise the duty, frequently selling when the market was depressed and prices low.
- The duty, having to be paid in a lump sum, raised the price of the goods by the amount of the interest on the capital required to pay the duty.
- Competition was stifled from the fact that large capital was required for the importation of the more heavily taxed articles.

To obviate these difficulties and to put a check upon frauds on the revenue, Robert Walpole proposed in his "excise scheme" of 1733, the system of warehousing for tobacco and wine. The proposal was unpopular, and it was not until 1803 that the system was actually adopted. That year, imported goods were to be placed in warehouses approved by the customs authorities, and importers were to give bonds for payment of duties when the goods were removed.

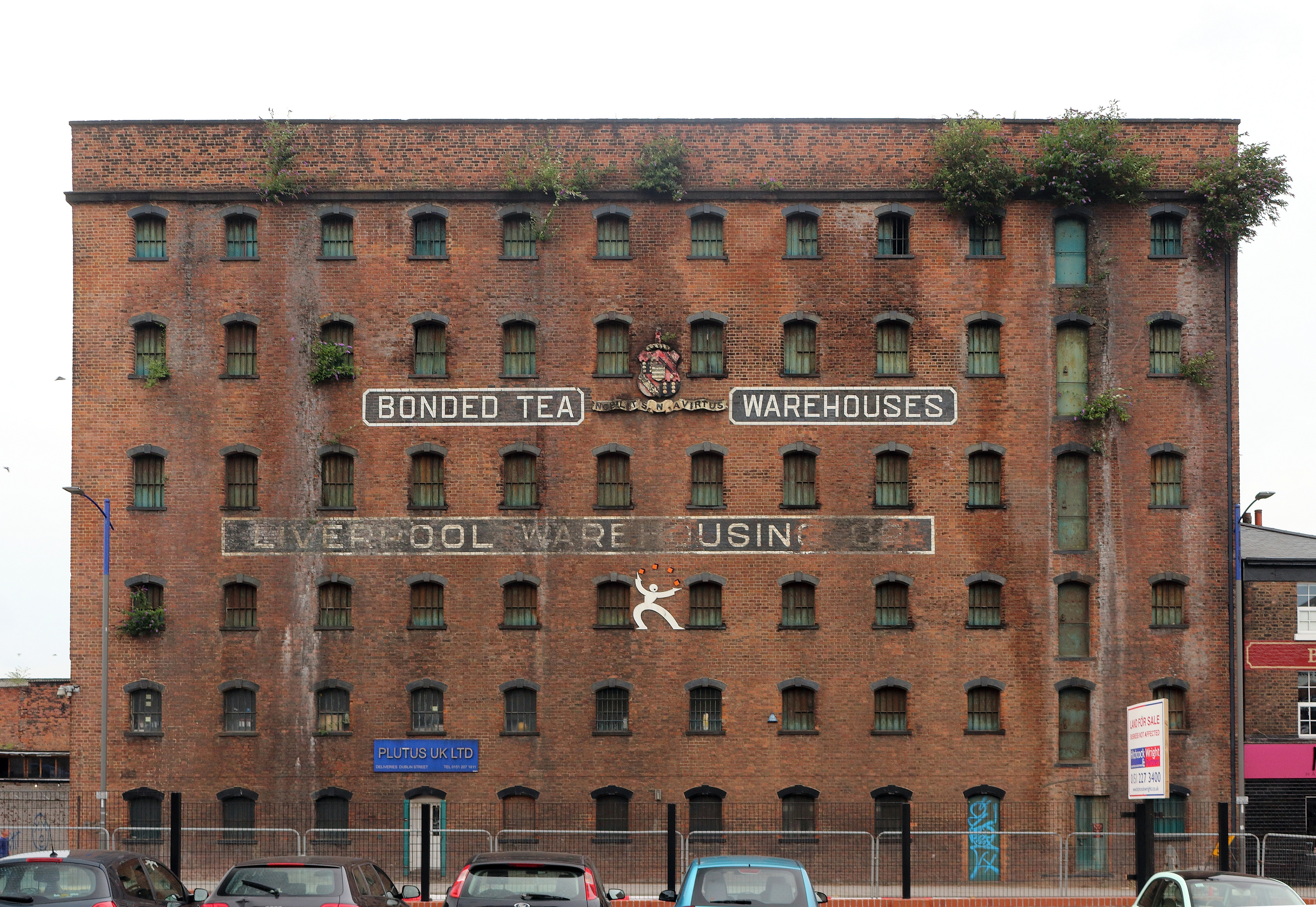
Bonded tea warehouse in Liverpool, England, built c. 1880

The Customs Consolidation Act 1853 (16 & 17 Vict. c. 107) dispensed with the giving of bonds, and laid down various provisions for securing the payment of customs duties on goods warehoused. These provisions are contained in the Customs Consolidation Act 1876 (39 & 40 Vict. c. 36), and the amending statutes, the Customs and Inland Revenue Act 1880 (14 Vict. c. 14), and the Revenue Act 1883 (46 & 47 Vict. c. 55). The warehouses are known as "king's warehouses", and section 284 of the Customs Consolidation Act 1876 defined them as "any place provided by the Crown or approved by the Commissioners of Customs for the deposit of goods for security thereof and the duties due thereon".

By section 12 of the 1876 act, the treasury may appoint warehousing ports or places, and the commissioners of customs may from time to time approve and appoint warehouses in such ports or places where goods may be warehoused or kept and fix the amount of rent payable in respect of the goods. Section 13 requires that the proprietor or occupier of every warehouse so approved (except existing warehouses of special security in respect of which security by bond has hitherto been dispensed with), or some one on his behalf, must, before any goods be warehoused therein, give security by bond, or such other security as the commissioners may approve of, for the payment of the full duties chargeable on any goods warehoused therein, or for the due exportation thereof.

All goods deposited in a warehouse, without payment of duty on the first importation, upon being entered for home consumption, are chargeable with existing duties on like goods under any customs acts in force at the time of passing such entry (section 19). The act also prescribes various rules for the unshipping, landing, examination, warehousing and custody of goods, and the penalties on breach. The system of warehousing has proved of great advantage both to importers and purchasers, as the payment of duty is deferred until the goods are required, while the title deeds, or warrants, are transferable by endorsement.

While the goods are in the warehouse ("in bond") the owner may subject them to various processes necessary to fit them for the market, such as the repacking and mixing of tea, the racking, vatting, mixing and bottling of wines and spirits, the roasting of coffee, the manufacture of certain kinds of tobacco, etc., and certain specific allowances are made in respect of waste arising from such processes or from leakage, evaporation and the like.

Bonded warehousing exists in much of the developed world. They are of note in the United States for their role in the production of bottled in bond spirits.

== See also ==
- Customs valuation
- Logistics
- Warehouse
- Import
- Export
- Bonded logistics park
