= Eritrean Free Zones Authority =

The Eritrean Free Zones Authority (EFZA) is the government agency charged with the development and oversight of the free economic zones in Eritrea. It offers two economic zones in Massawa and Assab, both coastal cities. The Free Zones were announced in August 2001, and later nominally opened in September 2006. The Authority is currently under the supervision of CEO Araya Tsegay.

The Massawa Free Zone offers access to the Massawa International Airport, as well as seaport access which includes a container terminal and processing facilities. The port will also have access to the rail link. Mining operations began in 2008 in central Eritrea.

The Assab Free Zone offers the Assab International Airport, as well as seaport access. It also contains a salt processing facility and an oil refinery.

Further expansions of the Free Zones Authority are planned, as they become viable.
