= Daegu–Gyeongbuk Free Economic Zone =

Free Economic Zone in South Korea

Daegu Gyeongbuk Free Economic Zone Authority (DGFEZ)
- Type: Free Economic Zone (government-owned, non-profit)
- Industry: Automotive, Aviation, IT, Education, Software, Healthcare, Green Energy
- Founded: 2008
- Headquarters: 489 DongDaegu-Ro, Dong-gu, Daegu Metropolitan City
- Products: R&D Center, Factory, Residential Housing
- Number of employees: 128

The Daegu–Gyeongbuk Free Economic Zone (DGFEZ) is a Free Economic Zone located in the southeastern part of South Korea. DGFEZ has 8 sites spanning over 20 square kilometers in Daegu, Pohang, Gyeongsan, and Yeongcheon. As of January 2014, DGFEZ is home to 150 organizations attracting over $2 billion in investment ($350 FDI).

The Daegu-Gyeongbuk region is home to 5.5 million people and over 13% of the nation's manufacturers including global conglomerates Samsung, LG, Hyundai and POSCO. DGFEZ focuses on 4 major industries; IT Convergence, High-tech Transportation Components, Green Energy, and Knowledge Services. The development of these districts is scheduled to conclude in 2020. DGFEZA has offices in Daegu and Seoul.

== History ==
The Daegu–Gyeongbuk Free Economic Zone was designated by the Korean central government on May 6, 2008 with the offices of DGFEZ opening its doors on August 13, 2008. The current commissioner of DGFEZ Authority is Byeong Sam Kim.

== Seongseo Industry District ==
Seongseo Industry District is a high-tech complex for automotive, machinery and IT convergence companies.

In January 2011, Seongseo Industry District was re-designated as part of Daegu's Special R&D Zone, and is no longer part of DG-FEZ, though there are still several foreign companies within the complex. In April 2011, Samsung LED and Sumitomo Chemical (from Japan) announced plans to invest 460 billion won (approx. USD425 million) to form a joint venture that will produce LED core materials (Saphire Wafers) in the Seongseo 5 High-Tech Industrial Complex. Stion (U.S.), a manufacturer of CIGS thin film solar PV cell announced plans to invest $320 million within Seongseo District in the spring of 2012.

Size: 1.47 km^{2}

Location: Dalseong, Daegu

== Gyeongsan R&BD District ==
Gyeongsan R&BD District is a site that is currently under development. Once complete the site will be geared for construction equipment manufacturing and R&D, medical devices manufacturing, working in collaboration with a large cluster of private education institutes in the region.

Size: 6.47 km^{2}

Location: Gyeongsan, North Gyeongsang Province

== Fashion Design District (Esiapolis) ==
Easiapolis is a fashion-based district that combines commercial, industrial, and residential. Esiapolis houses Lotte Outlet, clothing retailers, restaurants, and other entertainment facilities (CGV Movie Theater) The district also houses numerous Fashion-based R&D/education institutes including Daegu Textile Center (DTC) College of Korea Textile & Fashion Polytechnics (CKTFP), Korea Research Institute for Fashion Industry (KRIFI). Daegu International School which opened in September 2010 is also part of Esiapolis.

Size: 1.18 km^{2}

Location: Dong District, Daegu

== International Culture Industry District ==
The Culture Industry District will focus on the gaming industry. This district was designated as a Culture Industry Promotion District by the central government in April, 2008. Currently, 109 culture technology- related companies reside in this district, with further plans to attract a Game Contents Complex, a Broadcasting Media Center an ICT Park tower and an ICT Park mall.

In May 2010, Dassault Systèmes opened a R&D center at Daegu ICT Park. The R&D center will focus on the design of luxury ships.

Size: 0.07 km^{2} Location: Nam District, Daegu

== Daegu Technopolis ==
Daegu Technopolis is designed to become a leading high-tech science city in Northeast Asia. The site combines R&D, Education and High-tech Eco-friendly Manufacturing. Various national institutes and university branches specialized in convergence industries from automotive, green energy, electronics and telecommunication industries are within the district.

In Jan. 2011, Daegu Technopolis received designation as a Special R&D Zone by the central government. The first stage of development in Technoplis was completed in 2010, with the Daegu-Gyeongbuk Institute of Science & Technology opening its doors as the first resident.

As of May 2012, there have been two sizable investments within Technopolis. Hyundai IHL (a subsidiary of Hyundai Mobis) completed the first stage of its $95 million investment (April 2012) and it is operating a manufacturing center for automotive LED lamps. Nakamura-Tome Precision Industry has invested $19.7 million to construct a factory that is scheduled to be completed by the end of 2012.

Size: 7.27 km^{2}

Location: Dalseong, Daegu

== Suseong Medical District ==
Suseong Medical District takes a role as a center for Oriental medicine in Korea that bridges Oriental and Western medicine and establishes the district as a Mecca for alternative medicine research. Suseong Medical District aims to attract a foreign hospital, a Medical School, medical tourism facilities and R&D manufacturers. In part, high quality facilities for medical services helped this area receive the highest residential satisfaction score as rated by the National Consumer Satisfaction Index.

Size: 1.79 km^{2}

Location: Suseong, Daegu

== Sinseo Meditech District ==
Sinseo Meditech District is located inside Daegu Innovation City. The new development is part of a relocation plan made by the Korea Central Government for a balanced regional development. Daegu Innovation City will be home to 12 public agencies including KOGAS when development is complete around 2015.

In August 2009, the Korea Ministry of Health selected Daegu as one of 2 cities to house new high-tech medical facilities worth at least 5.6 trillion won ($4.6 billion). The "so-called" Medivalley will facilities will specialize in pharmaceuticals, medical devices and clinical testing.

Size: 4.22 km^{2}

Location: Sinseo dong, Daegu

== Yeongcheon High-Tech Park ==
Yeongcheon High-Tech Park is a manufacturing industrial complex. The district is home to an Automobile Park that supplies parts and materials for nearby automotive manufacturers including Hyundai Motors. Boeing Avionics Maintenance, Repair and Overhaul Facility (BAMRO) is under construction and will be complete by the end of 2014. The BAMRO will service avionics components for the Republic of Korea Air Force (ROKAF) fleet of F-15K Slam Eagles

Size: 2.30 km^{2}

Location: Yeongcheon, North Gyeongsang Province

== Yeongcheon Industry District ==
Yeongcheon Industry District is a district for automotive components, avionics, and logistics. This district is located in the middle of the Auto Valley, which stretches from Gumi to Ulsan. The Gyeongbuk Hybrid Technology Institute and Gyeongbuk Research Institute of Vehicle Embedded Technology will provide support and technical expertise.

As of September 2012, several foreign companies have invested in Yeongcheon Industry District. Daicel Corporation (Japan) invested 36 million USD in December 2011, to establish an airbag inflator factor. Faurecia (France) invested 21 million USD to construct a seat frame factory

Size: 1.67 km^{2}

Location: Yeongcheon, North GyeongsangProvince

== Pohang Fusion Tech District ==
Pohang is located in the center of South Korea's East Coast Energy Cluster, which stretches from Uljin to Gyeongju. Within this cluster, the nation's largest wind power and nuclear complexes operate. This area is also known for having some of the nation's best research institutes. Pohang Fusion Tech District will house Fuel Cell research and production, Wind Power, R&D institutes and Enterprises. In addition, the Korea's only accelerator laboratory (PAL) is located nearby at POSTECH.

Size: 3.75 km^{2}

Location: Pohang, Gyeongbuk Province

== International Partners ==
- Heidelberg Technology Park
- Higher Corporation for Specialized Economic Zones (ZonesCorp)
- The Gujarat Vittal Innovation City (GVIC)
- MEMS Industry Group
- Sophia Antipolis
- Universitat Autonoma de Barcelona
- World Trade Center Dulles Airport
- Zhongguancun Science Park
