= George Washington University School of Engineering and Applied Science =

The School of Engineering and Applied Science
- Other names: SEAS, GWU SEAS
- Motto: Deus Nobis Fiducia (In God Our Trust)
- Type: Private
- Established: 1884; 142 years ago
- Parent institution: George Washington University
- Dean: John Lach
- Faculty: 200
- Undergraduates: 786
- Postgraduates: 1220
- Doctoral students: 469
- Location: 800 22nd St. NW, Washington, D.C. 38.899°N 77.0498°W
- Campus: Urban—Foggy Bottom
- Website: www.seas.gwu.edu

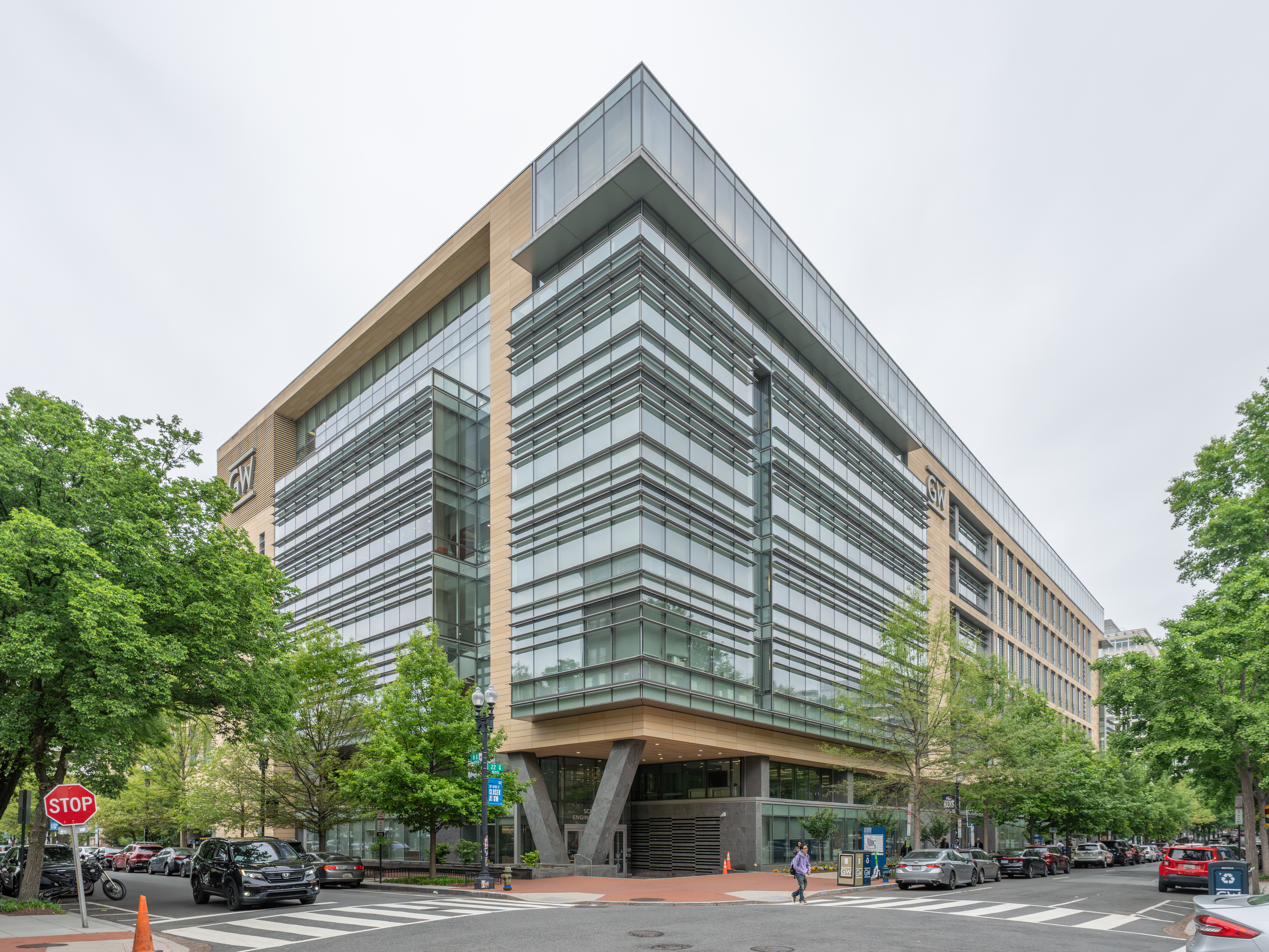
Science & Engineering Hall (2026)

The School of Engineering and Applied Science (SEAS) at the George Washington University in Washington, D.C., is a technical school which specializes in engineering, technology, communications, and transportation. The school is located on the main campus of the George Washington University and offers both undergraduate and graduate programs.

== History ==
In May 2011, site preparation began for construction of the $300 million project. The building consists of six below-grade stories used for lab space, parking, and mechanical systems, as well as eight above-grade stories. The design of the Science and Engineering Hall combines flexible, reconfigurable spaces within common areas on each floor to promote collaborative thinking and to integrate lectures and laboratories with hands-on projects. Other key features of the building include: a vibration and particulate-free nanotechnology facility, a three-story high-bay including a strong wall and floor with easy access to a street level loading dock, and a multi-use auditorium and media center for science and engineering symposia and conferences.

The building was designed by architecture firm Ballinger and conceptualized to meet the growing research needs of engineering disciplines. After four years of construction, which included demolishing the campus' largest parking deck, the building was completed in November 2014.

Since January 2015, the School of Engineering and Applied Science has occupied the Science and Engineering Hall on George Washington University's main campus in Foggy Bottom. Previously, the engineering school was housed in Tompkins Hall. Tompkins Hall is still used as office space for faculty as well as the computing facility.

The Science and Engineering Hall is the largest academic building dedicated to these fields in Washington, D.C. The facility is 500,000 square feet and eight floors tall. It houses 140 faculty members and classrooms used by four schools: the School of Engineering and Applied Science, Columbian College of Arts & Sciences, the School of Medicine and Health Sciences, and the Milken Institute School of Public Health. The building is designed with sustainability in mind.

== Departments ==
=== Biomedical Engineering ===
The Department of Biomedical Engineering offers Bachelor of Science, Master of Science, and Doctor of Philosophy degree programs in biomedical engineering. Until 2015, these programs were administered through the Department of Electrical and Computer Engineering.

Undergraduate students may choose from a number of options with the bachelor of science degree. Graduate students may select focus areas of concentration in medical imaging or medical instrumentation. Faculty and students conduct research programs across a wide array of topics, leveraging the proximity of the GW Schools of Medicine and Public Health, Children's National Medical Center, and federal agencies to do so. The department has 6 full-time faculty, 9 affiliated faculty, 228 undergraduate students, and 49 graduate students. Its annual research expenditure is around $1.2 million.

=== Civil and Environmental Engineering ===
The department offers a Bachelor of Science degree in civil engineering; a five-year bachelor's/master's degree; master's, doctoral, and professional degree programs in civil engineering; and several graduate certificate programs. The department has 12 full-time faculty, 83 undergraduate students, and 49 graduate students. It has an annual research expenditure of around $551,000.

=== Computer Science ===
The Department of Computer Science offers both Bachelor of Science and Bachelor of Arts degree programs in computer science, as well as a Master of Science and Doctor of Philosophy in computer science and a Master of Science in Cybersecurity in Computer Science. The department also offers a graduate certificate in computer security and information assurance.

The department is one of the largest at SEAS, both in terms of faculty and students. The department has 18 full-time faculty members, 187 undergraduate students, and 445 graduate students. It has an annual research expenditure of $3.7 million.

=== Electrical and Computer Engineering ===
The Department of Electrical and Computer Engineering (ECE) offers Bachelor of Science degree programs in computer engineering and electrical engineering. Students may also choose from a number of options with each degree. Graduate students may pursue Master of Science or Doctor of Philosophy degrees in computer engineering or electrical engineering. The department also offers a Master of Science degree program in telecommunications engineering, as well as professional degree programs and graduate certificate programs.

The department has 23 full-time faculty members, 87 undergraduate students, and 245 graduate students. It has an annual research expenditure of $2.65 million.

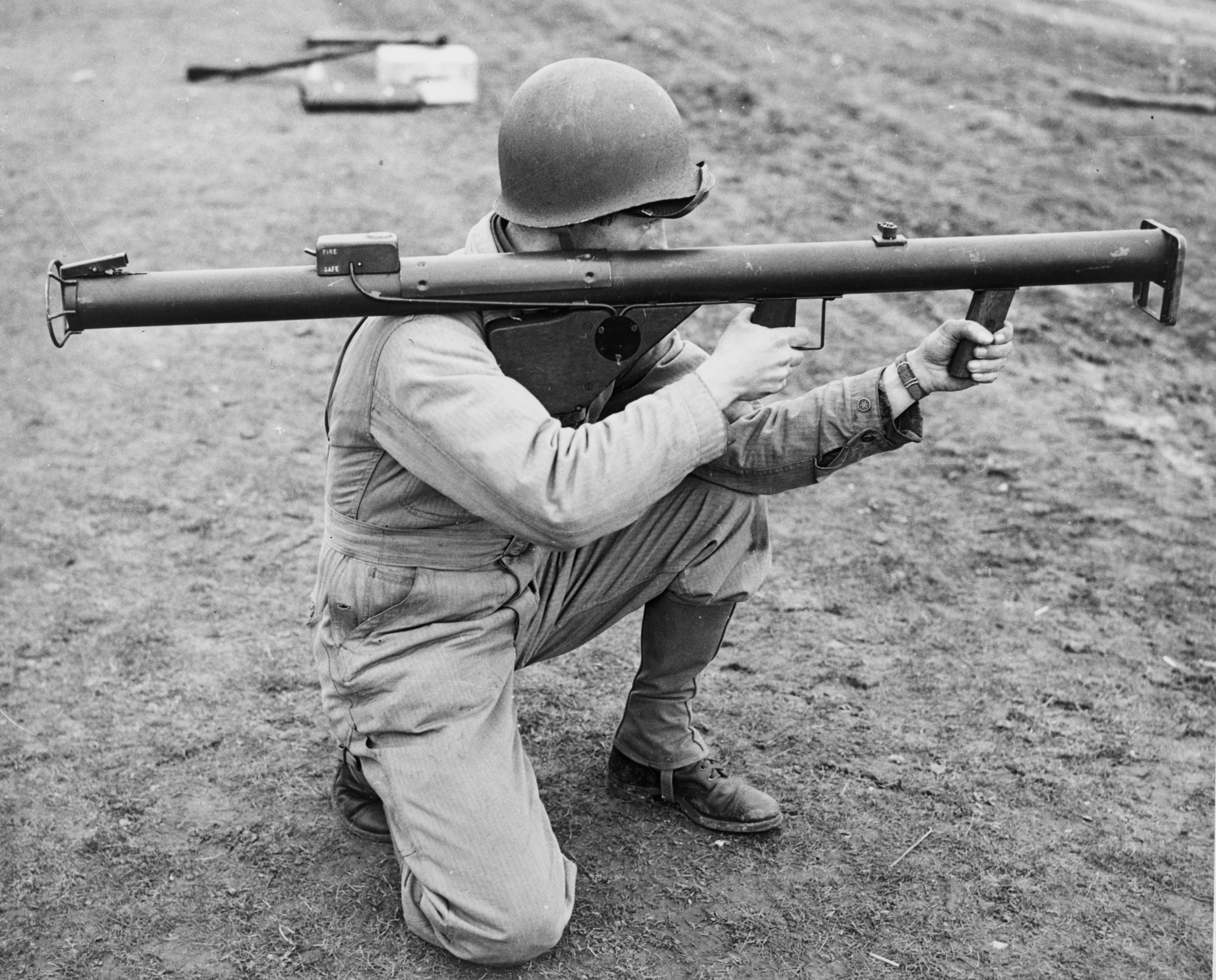
George Washington faculty developed the bazooka.

=== Engineering Management and Systems Engineering ===
The Department of Engineering Management and Systems Engineering offers Bachelor of Science, Bachelor of Arts, Master of Science, and Doctor of Philosophy degree programs in engineering management and systems engineering. They also offer an online Doctor of Engineering in engineering management. The department has 15 full-time faculty, 119 undergraduate students, and 879 graduate students. It has an annual research expenditure of $1.1 million.

=== Mechanical and Aerospace Engineering ===
The Department of Mechanical and Aerospace Engineering offers a Bachelor of Science degree program in mechanical engineering, a Master of Science, or Doctor of Philosophy degrees in mechanical and aerospace engineering. The department also offers professional degree programs and graduate certificate programs. It has 27 full-time faculty, 249 undergraduate students, and 152 graduate students. It has an annual research expenditure of $4.3 million.

== Research laboratories ==
SEAS has research laboratories dedicated to high-performance computing, nanotechnology, robotics, transportation engineering, among other fields, including:

Biomedical engineering research

Biomedical engineering research at the George Washington University includes biofluid dynamics, medical imaging, cardiac electrophysiology, plasma medicine, therapeutic ultrasound, nanomedicine and tissue engineering.

Cybersecurity research

Cybersecurity research is spread across six laboratories at the George Washington University including Dr. Zhang's laboratory which focuses on data security, the Cyber Security Policy and Research Institute, and Dr. Monteleoni's laboratory in Machine Learning.

== Undergraduate programs ==
With approximately 780 students enrolled, SEAS has a variety of undergraduate programs.

Applied Science and Technology (B.S.)

Biomedical Engineering (B.S.)

- The Bachelor of Science in Biomedical Engineering is an ABET-accredited program located in the Department of Electrical & Computer Engineering

Civil Engineering (B.S.)

The Department of Civil and Environmental Engineering (CEE) at SEAS has eleven full-time teaching and/or research faculty. The following programs are currently offered by the department as B.S. options (note that all BS degrees are degrees in civil engineering, not the concentration):

- Civil Engineering – This option is the most general of the options and has a bias toward structural engineering studies.
- Civil Engineering with Medical Preparation Option – This is the same degree, but with more emphasis in medical school preparation. Some changes include more requirements in chemistry and organic chemistry, and introduction to circuit theory.
- Environmental Engineering Option in Civil Engineering
- Transportation Option in Civil Engineering
- Sustainability option in Civil Engineering
- 5-year Bachelor's/Master's programs – The department recently enacted three options for both general CE and EE option students to complete a Master of Science degree in one additional year. A letter of intent is necessary, along with a 3.0 GPA, but application to the graduate school and GREs are not necessary. There are currently three options available:
  - B.S./M.S. in Civil Engineering with Structural Engineering Focus
  - B.S./M.S. in Civil Engineering with Environmental Engineering Focus
  - B.S./M.S. in Civil Engineering with Transportation Engineering Focus

Computer Engineering (B.S.)

Offered through the Department of Electrical and Computer Engineering, the computer engineering program combines the study of electronic system hardware design with computer software design. Students in the program are prepared in the theory and application of hardware and software design, computer networks, embedded systems, and very large scale integrated (VLSI) circuit design and applications. Students can take electives in advanced topics, such as optical networks, broadband wireless networks, and technologies for the next generation of information systems.

Students work on projects in modern, well-equipped VLSI and computer engineering laboratories. The capstone design sequence involves students in the design and fabrication of a large-scale digital system based on their area of interest.

This program is accredited by the Engineering Accreditation Commission of ABET.

Computer Science (B.S.)

Technical Tracks:

- Computer Security and Information Assurance – for students interested in the design and implementation of secure computing infrastructures.
- Artificial Intelligence (AI) – for students interested in artificial intelligence and its applications.
- Computational Mathematics and Sciences
- Computer Graphics and Digital Media – for students interested in computer graphics, visualization, animation and digital media.
- Data Science
- Foundations and Theory – for students interested in exploring theory or developing strong foundations, perhaps in preparation for graduate work in Computer Science.
- Software engineering and Application Development – for students interested in the software engineering concepts and techniques required for the design and implementation of large software systems and applications.
- Systems – for students interested in the software engineering concepts and techniques required for the design and implementation of large software systems and applications.
- Individually designed technical track: This track will comprise at least three courses, not necessarily with CSci designations, but the content must meet a broad technical requirement that it be closely related to the disciplines of computing.

Computer Science (B.A.)

- Medical Preparation option – For those interested in combining a Computer Science major with preparation for admission to a school of medicine, the Medical Preparation options in the B.A. and B.S. programs add additional natural science material to the course requirements.
- Bioinformatics option – The emerging field of Bioinformatics combines the disciplines of Computer Science and Biochemistry, and focuses on the use of computers to characterize the molecular components of living things. Students choosing this option in either the B.S. or the B.A. program will study a number of subjects in Biology and Chemistry, including molecular biology and genetics, and take specific coursework in Bioinformatics. Both options also meet the requirements for medical school admission, and the B.A. option in bioinformatics meets the requirements for a second major in biology.
- Digital Media option – Digital Media encompasses audio, video, the World Wide Web and other technologies that can be used to create and distribute digital content. Graphics is the use of computers to create virtual worlds from which visuals can be generated. Students can choose between two degree options. The Bachelor of Science (BS) concentrates on the technology. The Bachelor of Arts (BA) explores the use of digital media and computer graphics in the arts, sciences, engineering, business, medicine, and other disciplines. The expanded breadth is made available through the opportunity to take related courses from other departments.
- Biomedical Computing option – Biomedical Computing is at the intersection of health care and computer science. It involves all aspects of the analysis, management, and visualization of information in biomedical applications. The technology is based on computer science, but the field demands knowledge of the problems that need to be solved in medicine and health care.

Electrical Engineering (B.S.)

Offered through the Department of Electrical and Computer Engineering, the electrical engineering program focuses on signal processing; communication theory and practice; voice, data, video and multimedia communication networks; very large scale integrated (VLSI) circuit design and applications; and control systems. Students can take electives in advanced topics, such as optical networks, broadband wireless networks, and technologies for the next generation of information systems.

This program is accredited by the Engineering Accreditation Commission of ABET.

Mechanical Engineering

The Mechanical Engineering Program is one of the oldest SEAS programs. Most graduates easily secure their EIT designation. The specialized major options are as follows:

- Aerospace Option in Mechanical Engineering – The Aerospace Engineering Option leads to a bachelor's degree in Mechanical Engineering while preparing the student to work in the aerospace industry or to pursue graduate study in Aerospace Engineering. It provides a strong foundation in aerodynamics, airplane performance, propulsion, aerospace structures, orbital mechanics, spacecraft dynamics, and aircraft and spacecraft design.
- The Biomechanical Engineering Option – The Biomechanical Engineering Option leads to a bachelor's degree in Mechanical Engineering while preparing the student to work in the biomedical industry or to pursue graduate study in biomedical engineering. It provides a strong foundation in human anatomy and physiology, biomechanics, biomaterials, and design of biomedical devices.
- Patent Law Option in Mechanical Engineering – The Patent Law Option leads to a bachelor's degree in Mechanical Engineering while providing a strong foundation in fundamental principles of patent law and the influences of the US patent system on modern engineering design. A student in this option obtains background that can lead to work as a technical specialist in a patent law firm or in the patent department of an industrial employer. The option also provides excellent preparation for pursuit of a subsequent law school degree in intellectual property.
- Robotics option in Mechanical Engineering

Systems Engineering

Systems Engineering is a multidisciplinary field that applies engineering techniques and mathematical methods to improve planning and decision making. By observing systems composed of people, machines, and procedures, Systems Engineers attempt to model and predict the behavior of complex systems so that they can be (re)designed to operate optimally.

== Graduate programs ==
As of the Spring 2017 semester, SEAS offers 12 master's programs, 8 doctoral programs, and 13 certificate programs. It also facilitates a number of combined B.S./M.S. programs for current GW undergraduate students, as well as accelerated master's programs with global partner institutions and special programs for working professionals in select tech and government agencies located in Washington, D.C., and Northern Virginia, such as Booz Allen Hamilton.

As of Fall 2016, there were 834 graduate students enrolled in a master's or doctorate program. In terms of gender ratio, 27% of the graduate students at SEAS are female, one of the highest in the country. Degree programs are offered in the following fields of study. They may be completed full-time or part-time on George Washington University's main campus in Foggy Bottom and off-campus sites in Arlington, Virginia:

Biomedical Engineering (M.S., Ph.D.)

Offered through the Department of Biomedical Engineering, the M.S. and Ph.D. programs in Biomedical Engineering are designed to prepare students to apply engineering principles to problems in medicine and biology; to understand and model attributes of living systems; and to synthesize biomedical systems and devices. Students choose from two areas of focus: Medical imaging or medical instrumentation. Students may choose to do a master's thesis or take extra courses in lieu of a thesis.

Civil and Environmental Engineering (M.S., Ph.D.)

The Department of Civil and Environmental Engineering offers graduate degree and certificate programs that are designed to help students explore solutions for issues such as improving clean water access; designing intelligent transportation systems to alleviate traffic congestion; improving the crashworthiness of cars; and designing bridges to become more resistant to earthquake.

Students choose from six areas of focus:

- Engineering mechanics
- Environmental engineering
- Geotechnical engineering
- Structural engineering
- Transportation safety engineering
- Water safety engineering

Computer Engineering (M.S., Ph.D.)

Offered through the Department of Electrical and Computer Engineering, the Master of Science program in Computer Engineering program offers up-to- date knowledge and skills in the advances of computer systems architecture and networking and in the rapidly growing use of superscalar microprocessors, real-time embedded systems, VLSI and ASIC design modules, digital signal processors and networked computing platforms. Students learn sophisticated computer architecture and integrated circuit design techniques using industry-standard computer-aided design tools and choose from among two areas of focus: computer architecture and high-performance computing or microelectronics and VLSI systems. The program offers a flexible schedule that includes courses in the late afternoon and evening, as well as the ability to choose a thesis or non-thesis degree option.

The doctoral program in computer engineering is designed to involve students in research in the areas of computer architecture and high-performance computing, or microelectronics and VLSI systems. The research interests of the faculty in the computer architecture and high-performance computing area span computer architecture, parallel processing, cloud computing, and high-performance and grid computing. In the microelectronics and VLSI design area, the faculty's interests include the design and modeling of electronic and nanoelectronic devices and systems, microfluidic devices integrated with electronic devices, the design of MicroElectroMechanical Systems (MEMS) for sensors and for RF-MEMS devices, micro and nanoelectronic circuits with applications to sensors and biosensors, and techniques to develop CMOS Integrated sensors and their interface circuits using analog and digital circuits.

Students choose from the following Areas of Focus in selecting their coursework:

- Computer architecture and high-performance computing
- MEMS, electronics, and photonics (microelectronics and VLSI systems)

Computer Science (M.S., Ph.D.)

Offered through the Department of Computer Science, the M.S., Ph.D., and certificate programs in Computer Science are designed to equip students with excellent skills at the forefront of computing. Through research and teaching, the department contributes to computing breakthroughs that are fueling advances in medicine, communications, transportation, security, and other areas vital to society and the world. Students choose from the following areas of focus:

- Algorithms and theory
- Computer architecture, networks, parallel and distributed computing
- Computer security and information assurance
- Database and information retrieval systems
- Machine intelligence and cognition
- Multimedia, animation, graphics, and user interface
- Software engineering and systems

Cybersecurity in Computer Science (M.S.)

Offered through the Department of Computer Science, the M.S. in Cybersecurity in Computer Science is designed to address the demand for technical cybersecurity experts. As the first such degree offered in the D.C. area, students study cybersecurity concepts related to national security, the economy, and private citizens. Students take a combination of core courses focused on design and analysis of algorithms, computer architectures, and advanced software paradigms, combined with security courses (e.g., applied cryptography, computer network defense) and electives.

Additionally, the program is federally designated as a National Center of Academic Excellence for Information Assurance Excellence by the Department of Homeland Security and National Security Agency. This qualifies students for internships, scholarships, and job opportunities with the U.S. government in the cybersecurity field.

Cybersecurity Policy & Compliance (M.Eng.)

Offered through the Off-Campus division of the Department of Engineering Management and Systems Engineering (EMSE). The Master of Engineering in Cybersecurity Policy and Compliance (M.Eng.[CPC]) follows this history, bringing a fully online cybersecurity master's degree to those seeking critical positions at the managerial level leading an organization's cyber practices.

Data Analytics (M.S.)

Established in 2017, the Data Analytics program is jointly administered between the Departments of Computer Science (CS) and Engineering Management & Systems Engineering (EMSE). It is a terminal master's degree.

Electrical Engineering (M.S., Ph.D.)

Offered through the Department of Electrical and Computer Engineering, students choose their coursework around specific research areas of the department, such as wireless/mobile communications, micro-electro- mechanical systems, magnetics, and remote sensing.

Students in the doctoral program in electrical engineering conduct research in a variety of areas. Students can choose from the following six areas of focus: communications and networks; electrical power and energy; electromagnetics, radiation systems, and microwave engineering; microelectronics and VLSI systems; and signal and image processing, systems and controls.

Students choose from the following Areas of Focus in selecting their coursework:

- Applied electromagnetics
- Communications and networks
- Electrical power and energy
- Electronics, photonics, and MEMS (VLSI systems and microelectronics)
- Signal and image processing, systems and controls

Engineering Management (M.S., Ph.D., D. Eng.)

Offered through the Department of Engineering Management and Systems Engineering (EMSE), the M.S., Ph.D., D. Eng., and certificate programs in Engineering Management are designed to prepare technical managers who need a broad education in order to keep an organization operating efficiently and working ahead of its competitors. The Engineering Management program provides a graduate education in management techniques for technical and scientific organizations.

Students choose from five areas of focus:

- Crisis, emergency and risk management
- Economics, finance and cost engineering
- Engineering and technology management
- Environmental and energy management
- Knowledge and information management

Mechanical and Aerospace Engineering (M.S., Ph.D.)

Programs offered include:

- Aerospace engineering
- Design of mechanical engineering systems
- Fluid mechanics, thermal sciences, and energy
- Industrial engineering
- Solid mechanics and materials science
- Structures and dynamics
- Robotics, mechatronics, and controls

Regulatory Biomedical Engineering (M.Eng.)

Systems Engineering (M.S., Ph.D.)

The following options are offered:

- Operations research and management science
- Systems engineering and integration
- Enterprise information assurance

Telecommunications Engineering (M.S.)

Offered through the Department of Electrical and Computer Engineering, the Master of Science in Telecommunications Engineering is geared towards the practicing or aspiring telecommunications engineer. The program provides students with a foundation in the fundamentals of telecommunications engineering, including topics such as transmission systems, computer networking, network architectures and protocols, and telecommunications security protocols. Optionally, students may take courses on optical networking, wireless networking, cloud computing, and other current topics.

=== Certificate programs ===
Certificate programs are offered in the following areas. Each program consists of 4–6 courses to be completed within one calendar year or at the student's desired pace. Students enrolled in a master's or doctoral program may also complete a certificate in conjunction with their degree:

- Computer-Integrated Design in Mechanical & Aerospace Engineering
- Computer Security and Information Assurance
- Emergency Management and Public Health
- Energy Engineering and Management
- Engineering and Technology Management
- Enterprise Information Assurance
- Environmental Engineering
- Geoenvironmental Engineering
- High-Performance Computing
- Homeland Security Emergency Preparedness and Response
- Structural Engineering
- Systems Engineering
- Transportation Engineering

== Notable alumni ==
Many of the school's former students have gone on to careers in both the private and public sectors. Some notable alumni include Ian Waitz (Vice Chancellor of Massachusetts Institute of Technology), Stanley Crane (CEO of Southern Railway (U.S.) and member of the National Academy of Engineering), Mario Cardullo (inventor of read-write Radio-frequency identification), and Christopher J. Wiernicki (CEO of American Bureau of Shipping), among numerous others.

Notable Alumni of the GW School of Engineering & Applied Science

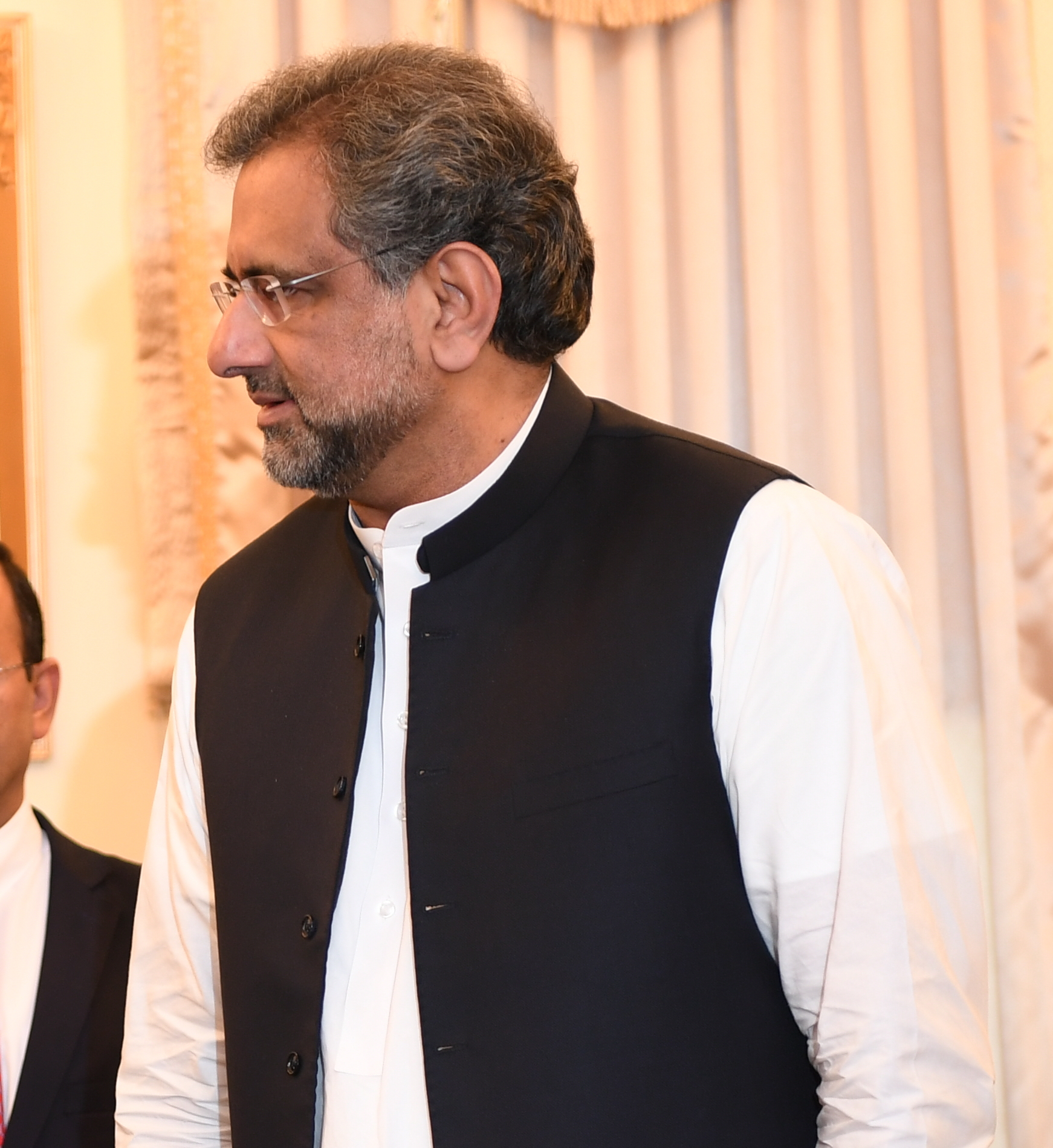
Shahid Abbasi, 21st Prime Minister of Pakistan

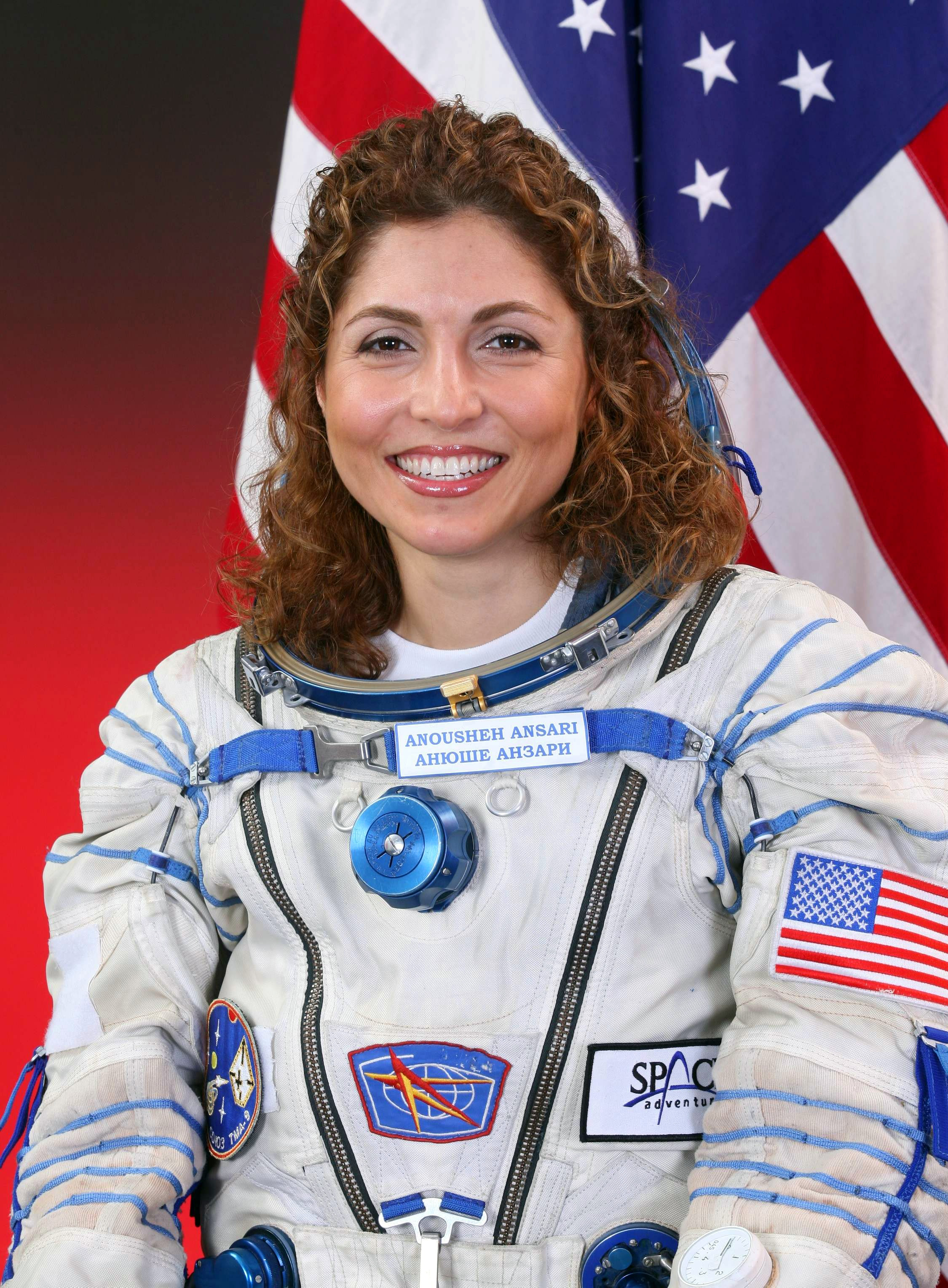
Anousheh Ansari, CEO of X Prize Foundation and space flight participant

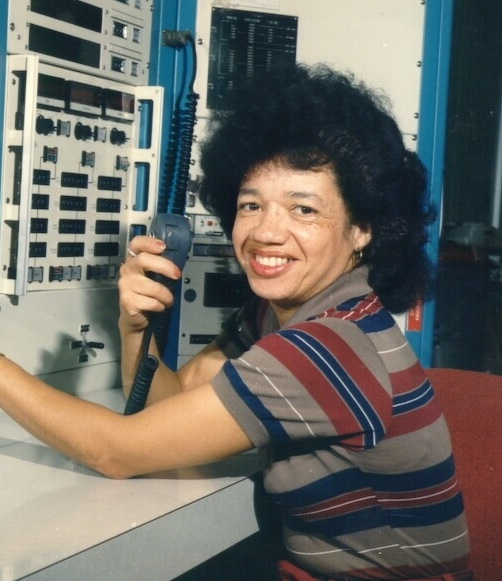
Christine Darden, first woman to be in the Senior Executive Service at NASA, basis for Hidden Figures

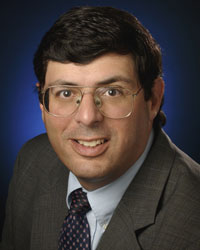
Christopher Scolese, current Director of the Goddard Space Flight Center

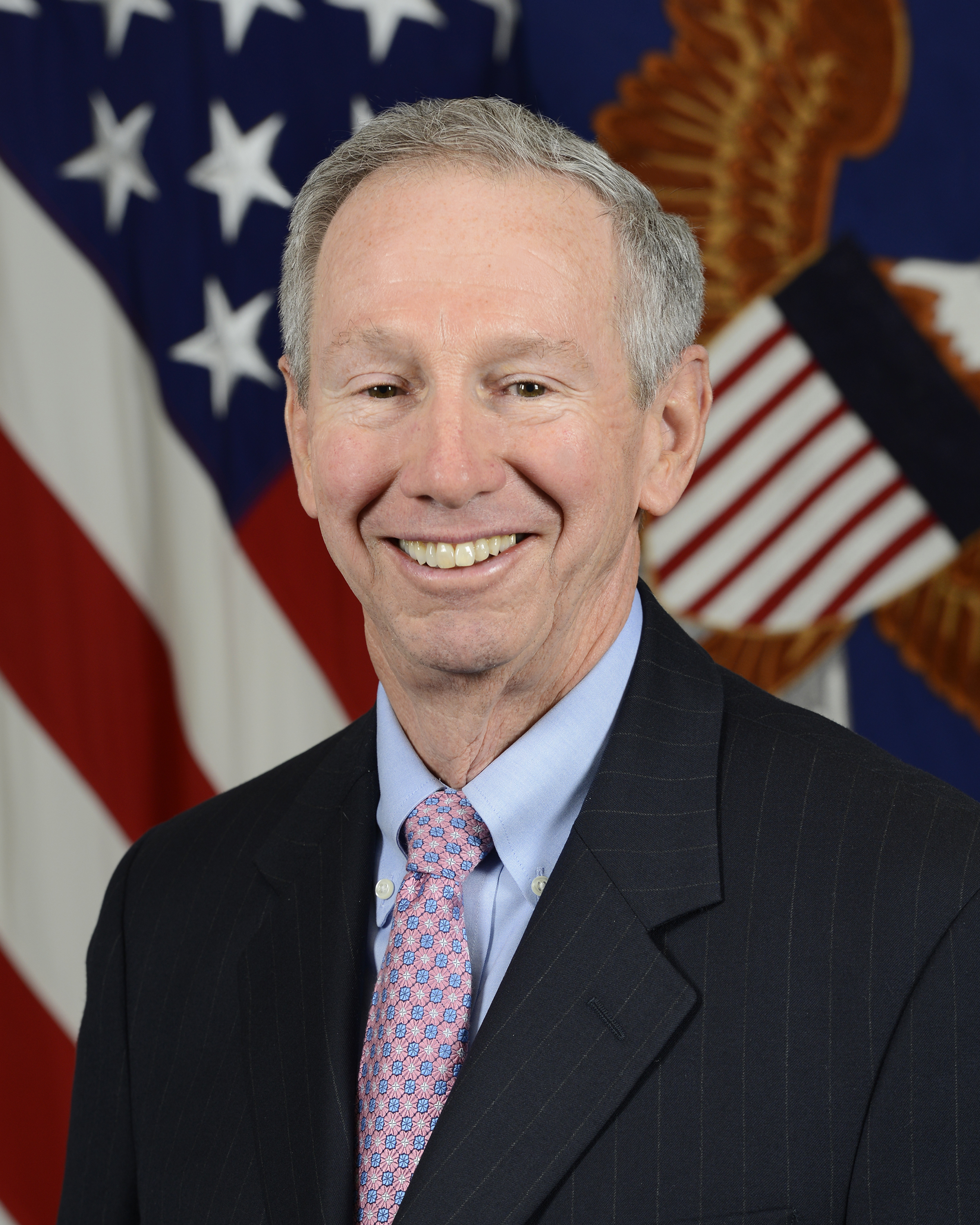
Michael D. Griffin, current Under Secretary of Defense for Research and Engineering

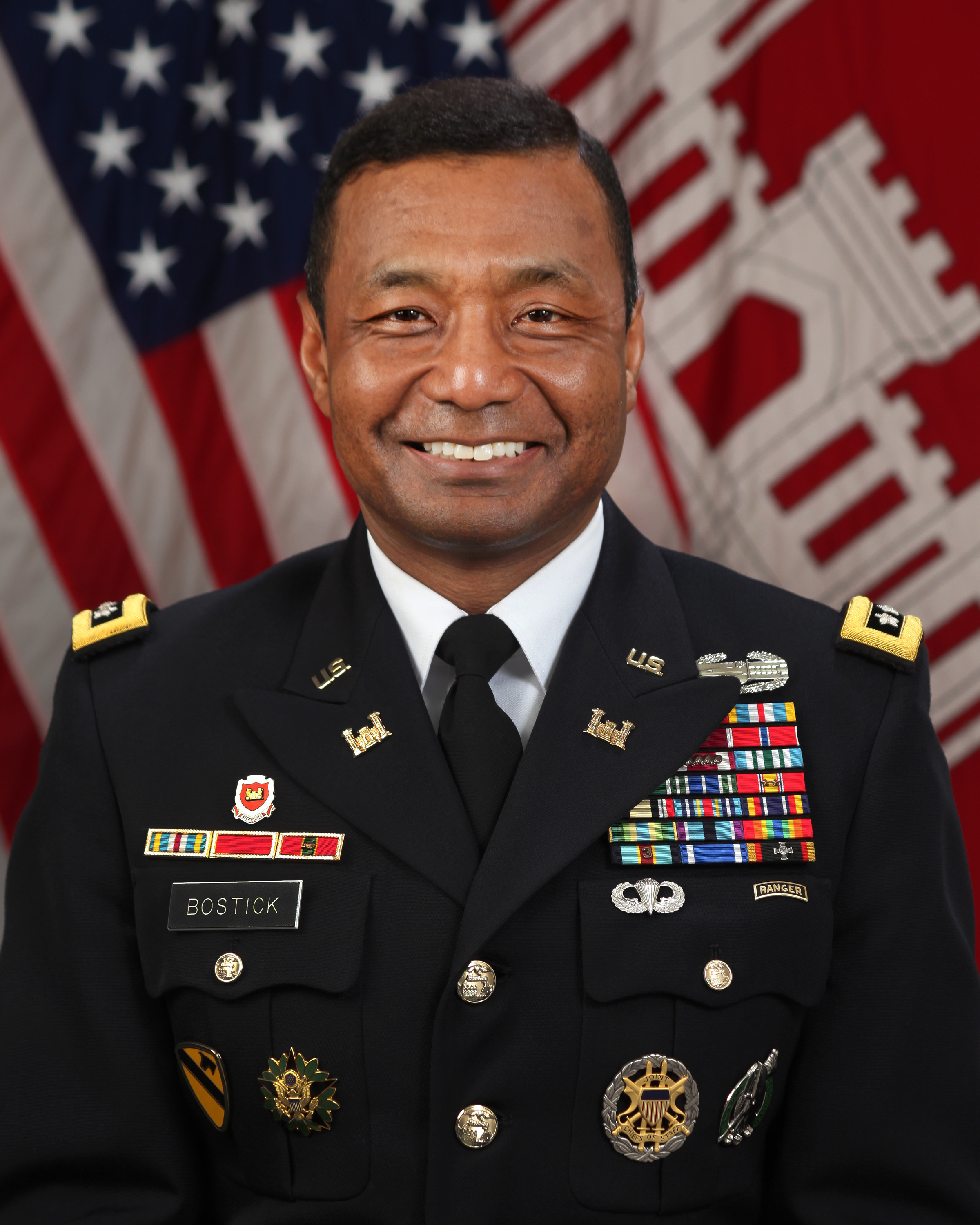
Thomas P. Bostick, 53rd Chief of Engineers of the Army Corps of Engineers

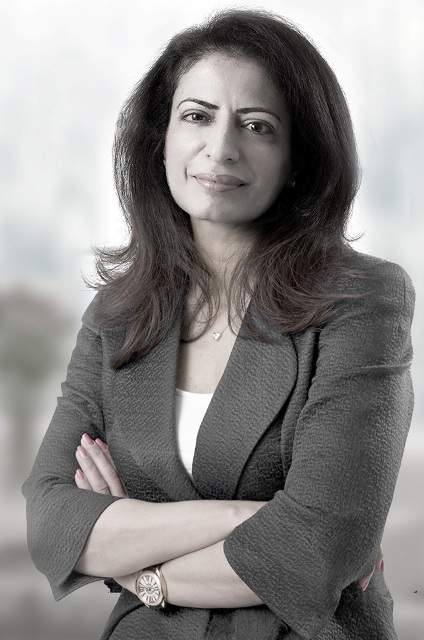
Amina Al Rustamani, CEO of TECOM Group, Director of AW Rostamani Group

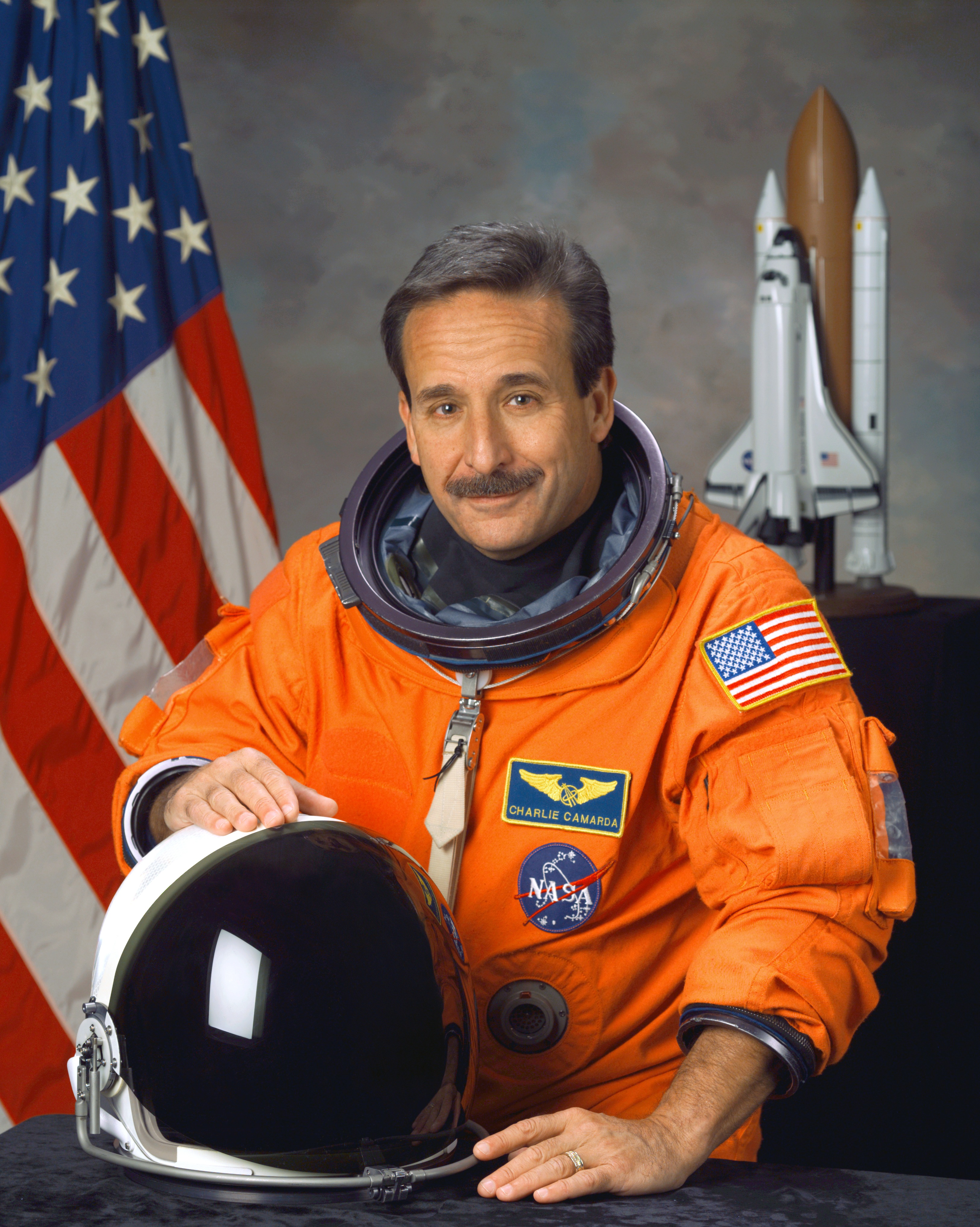
Charles Camarda, NASA astronaut, Senior Advisor for Engineering Development at Langley Research Center

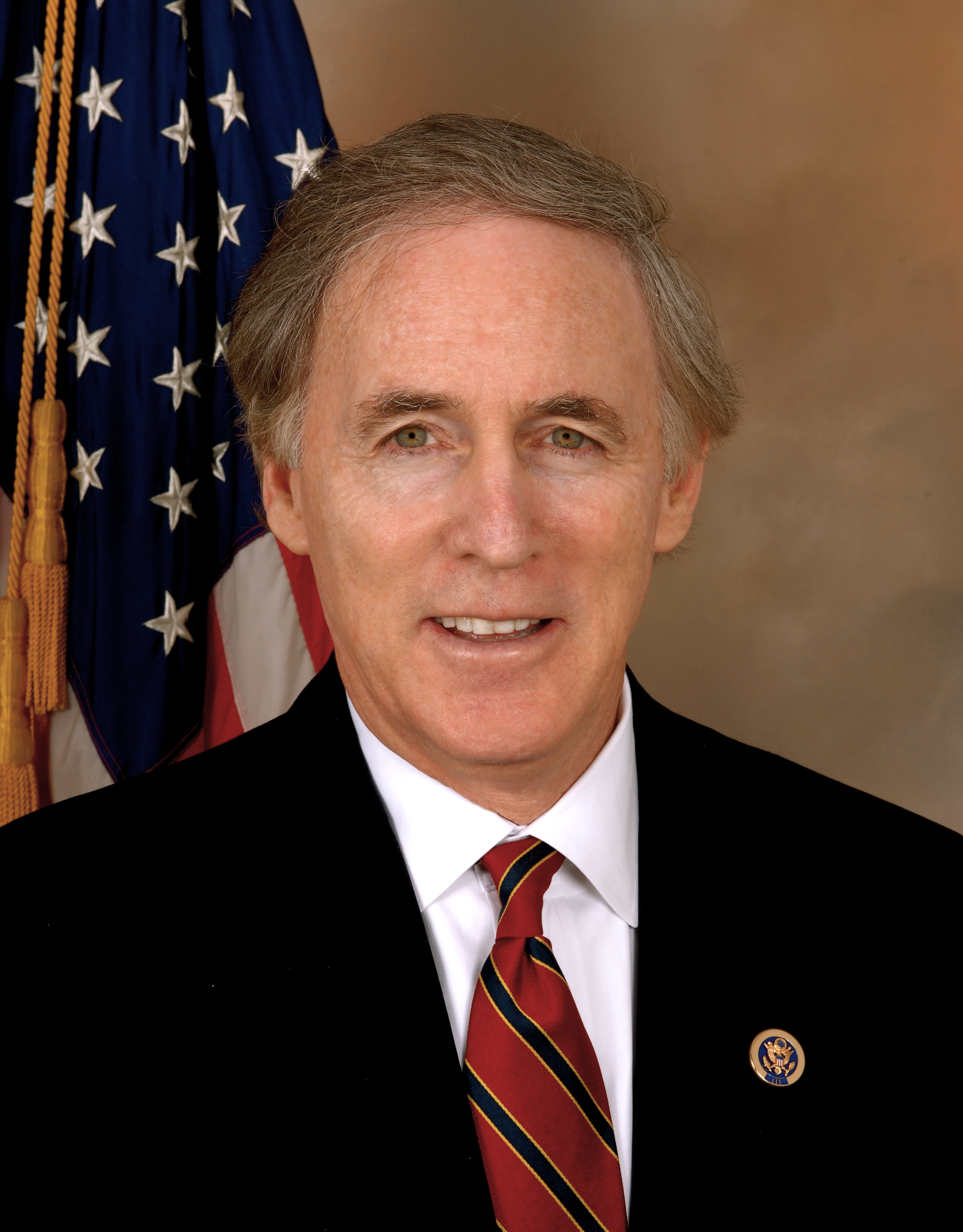
Cliff Stearns, U.S. Congressman, former Chair of the Subcommittee on Oversight and Investigations

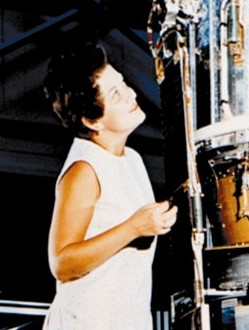
Marjorie Townsend, first woman to manage a spacecraft launch for NASA

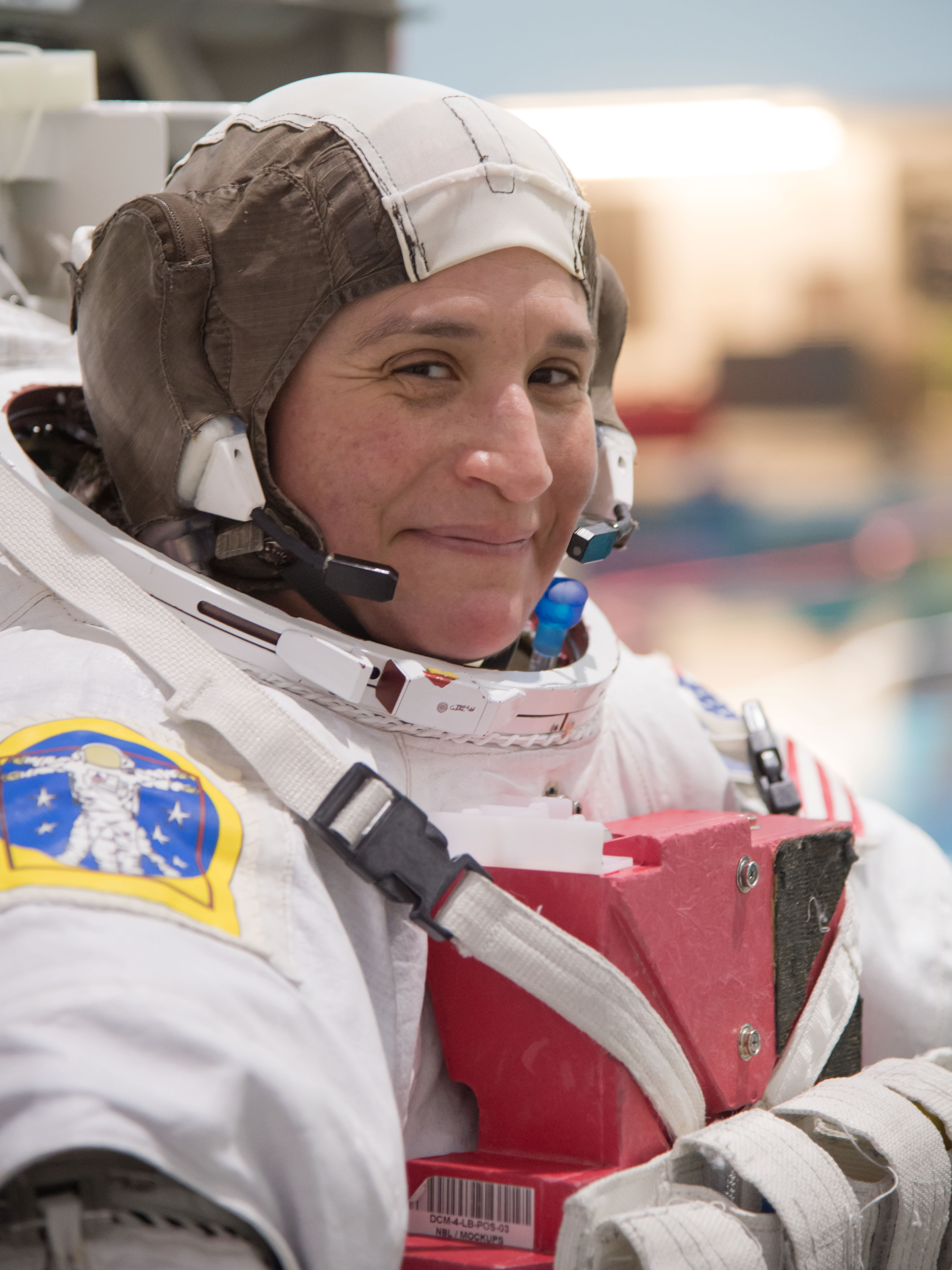
Serena Auñón-Chancellor, NASA astronaut
