= Dubai Development Authority =

- سلطة دبي للتطوير

Agency overview
- Jurisdiction: Dubai, United Arab Emirates
- Headquarters: Dubai Studio City, Commercial Building 1, Ground Floor
- Agency executives: Sheikh Maktoum Bin Mohammed Bin Rashid Al Maktoum, Chairman; Ahmad Bin Byat, Director General; Ali Ahmad BuRuhaima, Deputy Director General
- Child agencies: Dubai International Film Festival; Dubai Film and TV Commission; Dubai Design and Fashion Council
- Website: dda.gov.ae

The Dubai Development Authority (DDA) (Arabic: سلطة دبي للتطوير), formerly known as the Dubai Creative Clusters Authority and Dubai Technology and Media Free Zone Authority, is a Dubai government authority that oversees the development, control, municipal, economic, and immigration functions across select free zone clusters and other communities by various master developers throughout Dubai.

The Authority was launched in 2000, it was created to position Dubai as a global center for knowledge-based industries. As the primary regulatory and administrative organization for several free zone parks within Dubai, the Authority is responsible for managing business application procedures and issuing licenses. It also enforces and implements laws within its jurisdiction. The Authority's leadership comprises Sheikh Maktoum Bin Mohammed Bin Rashid Al Maktoum, the Deputy Ruler of Dubai, who serves as the Chairman of the Dubai Creative Clusters Authority, and Ahmad Bin Byat, who holds the position of Director General The Authority is mandated to drive the growth of Dubai's creative industries by developing policies and programmes to attract, retain, and grow creative businesses in Dubai. It has formed a partnership with Dubai SME to support entrepreneurs and enhance the capabilities of the vital SME sector in the emirate.

In 2015, the Authority released its first report titled "Celebrating 15 years of success and a new mandate." The report provides details of the Authority's new mandate and how it will support and enhance Dubai's creative industries. It was aimed to be used as a benchmark to measure DCCA's delivery against its mandate and is a stepping stone towards fulfilling the Authority's role in providing research, intelligence, and advocacy.

DDA is also responsible for issuing licenses for several entities including Dubai Academic City, Dubai Design District, Dubai Internet City, Dubai Media City, Dubai Knowledge Park, Dubai Production City, Dubai Outsource City, Dubai Studio City and Dubai Science Park. The Authority has also established industry committees & councils to champion key creative industries, investing AED 40 million annually towards the Dubai Design and Fashion Council, Dubai International Film Festival & Dubai Film and TV Commission.
