= 21st Century Tower =

Coordinates: 25°12′39″N 55°16′34″E

- 21st Century Tower in 2017
- Interactive map of the 21st Century Tower area

General information
- Status: Completed
- Type: Residential
- Location: Dubai, United Arab Emirates
- Construction started: 2001
- Completed: 2003
- Owner: A W Rostamani Real Estate

Height
- Antenna spire: 269 m (883 ft)
- Roof: 240 m (787 ft)
- Top floor: 185.7 m (609 ft)

Technical details
- Floor count: 55
- Lifts/elevators: 7

Design and construction
- Architects: WS Atkins and Partners

The 21st Century Tower is a 55-story skyscraper along the Sheikh Zayed Road in Dubai. When it was completed in 2003 it took the title of the world's tallest residential building, ultimately being surpassed by the Eureka Tower in Melbourne, Australia and the Q1 tower in Australia's Gold Coast.

The logo of the AW Rostamani Group appears on the top of the tower.

== See also ==
- List of tallest buildings in the United Arab Emirates
- List of tallest buildings in Dubai
