= Christopher J. Wiernicki =

American marine engineer (1958)

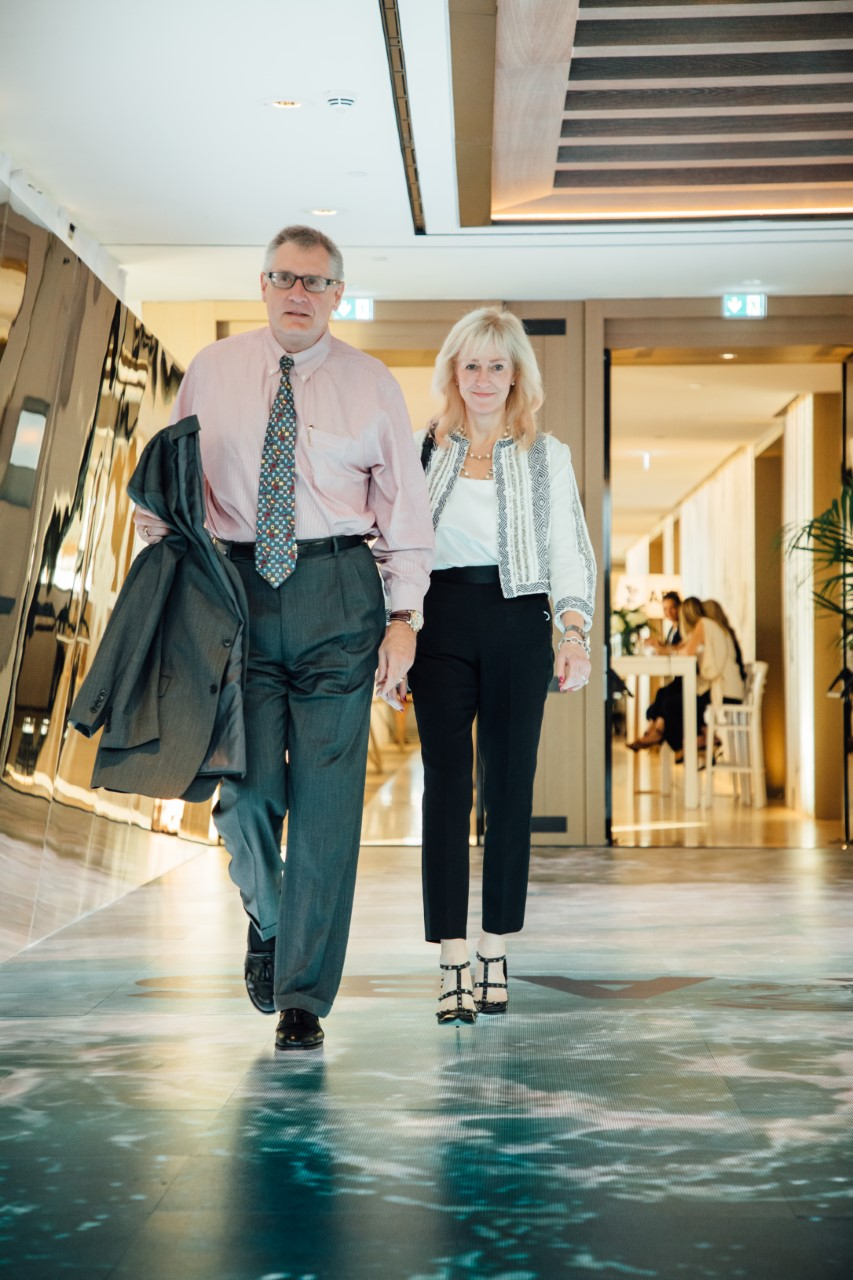
- Wiernicki and wife Joan in 2022
- Born: September 29, 1958 (age 67)
- Education: Vanderbilt University, George Washington University, Massachusetts Institute of Technology
- Occupations: Naval architect, engineer, businessperson
- Title: Former Chairman and CEO of American Bureau of Shipping; Chairman of ABS Group of Companies.

Christopher J. Wiernicki (born September 29, 1958) is a naval architect, engineer, and businessperson. He was President and CEO of ABS, an international classification organization, from 2011 to 2012; Chairman, President and CEO from 2013 to 2023 and was Chairman and CEO from 2024 until his retirement on December 31, 2025. He has served as a member of the White House National Infrastructure Advisory Council (NIAC).

== Career ==
Wiernicki obtained his BS degree in civil engineering from Vanderbilt University, an MS degree in structural engineering from George Washington University, and an MS degree in ocean engineering from the Massachusetts Institute of Technology. He also completed the Harvard Business School Advanced Management Program.

Prior to joining ABS in 1993, Wiernicki was president and CEO of Designers and Planners Inc., a naval architecture firm.

In 2013, Wiernicki was inducted into the George Washington University School of Engineering and Applied Science Hall of Fame. He received The Vice Admiral Emory S. "Jerry" Land Medal from the Society of Naval Architects and Marine Engineers for Outstanding Accomplishment in the Marine Field. In 2016, Wiernicki was inducted into the International Maritime Hall of Fame and received the Admiral of the Ocean Seas Award from the United Seamen's Service. He has been awarded honorary Doctor of Science degrees from Maine Maritime Academy, Webb Institute, and State University of New York Maritime College. Wiernicki was chairman of council of the International Association of Classification Societies from 2015 to 2016. In 2017, Wiernicki was inducted to the Vanderbilt University School of Engineering Academy of Distinguished Alumni, named to the Vanderbilt University School of Engineering's Board of Visitors, conferred an honorary Doctor of Engineering degree from Stevens Institute of Technology, and named the Massachusetts Maritime Academy's Person of the Year. In 2018, he was recognized as one of the top 50 influential people in the tanker shipping and trade industry by Tanker Shipping & Trade and was named the International Personality of the Year at the annual Greek Shipping Awards. On June 20, 2020, Wiernicki was the Distinguished Industry Speaker at the U.S. Merchant Marine Academy's Commencement Ceremony for the Class of 2020. In January 2021, he was elected to the U.S. National Academy of Engineering for innovations in the design, engineering, and operation of ships and offshore structures. He served as a member of the White House National Infrastructure Advisory Council, which advises the White House on how to reduce risks and improve the resilience of the nation's critical infrastructure sectors.

In March 2023, he accepted a position on Singapore's Maritime International Advisory Panel (IAP). The IAP was established by the Singapore Ministry of Transport (MOT) and Maritime and Port Authority of Singapore (MPA) to seek global perspectives on key trends that will shape the maritime industry. In April 2023, Wiernicki was awarded the GREEN4SEA Leadership Award, recognizing his industry leadership and contribution to a more sustainable industry. In June 2023, he delivered the Commencement Message to the graduating class of 2023 at the Webb Institute. In October 2023, Wiernicki was selected to receive the first Seatrium Visiting Professorship at the National University of Singapore College of Design and Engineering, a program designed to attract top talent from the energy transition and sustainability sectors to promote knowledge transfer, capability building and support development of innovative maritime technology.

In December 2024, Wiernicki was featured at number 68 in the 2024 Lloyds List Top 100 People in Shipping ranking of the leading individuals of influence in shipping. In March 2025, he was elected to the CNA Board of Trustees for a four-year term. In April 2025, Breakbulk News hailed Wiernicki for his long-standing leadership in the maritime sector and his role in guiding ABS through the maritime transition and technological evolution. In May 2025, he was the commencement speaker at the 141st George Washington University (GW) School of Engineering and Applied Science Graduation Celebration. He was honored by The Seaman’s Church Institute (SCI) in June, receiving the 2025 Silver Bell Award for lifelong service and outstanding leadership in the maritime industry. The North American Marine Environment Protection Association (NAMEPA) recognized his distinguished career advancing maritime innovation, safety, and modernization with a Lifetime Achievement Award in a ceremony in New York in October 2025. In December 2025, he was named International Personality of the Year at the Lloyds List Greek Shipping Awards, the second time he has received the honor and he was featured at number 72 in the 2025 Lloyds List ranking of the Top 100 People in Shipping. ABS was named Number One Classification Society by Gross Tonnage in the 2025 Lloyds List ranking of the Top 10 Class Organizations. For his years of service and dedication to the industry, Wiernicki was awarded the U.S. Coast Guard Distinguished Service Medal at the end of 2025. In 2026, he joined the board of directors of Royal Caribbean Group(the parent of Royal Caribbean International.)
