= International Maritime Hall of Fame =

The International Maritime Hall of Fame is a museum honouring people who have made a large contribution in the maritime field. The hall of fame inducted its first set of honorees in or about 1994. The hall is sponsored by the Maritime Association of the Port of New York and New Jersey.

== Inductees ==
For 1994-2008 inductees, see footnote

- Malcom McLean - creator of international standard shipping containers.

=== 2000 ===
See footnote

=== 2001 ===
See footnote

=== 2003 ===
Christopher L. Koch, president and CEO, World Shipping Council

Olav K. Rakkenes, former president and CEO, Atlantic Container Line

Charles G. Raymond, chairman, CEO and president, Horizon Lines

Paul F. Richardson, principal, Paul F. Richardson & Associates

Henk Van Hemmen, president emeritus, Martin, Ottaway Van Hemmen & Dolan Inc.:

John Arnold Witte, Sr., CEO and president, Donjon Marine Co., Inc.

=== 2009 ===
See footnote

=== 2010 ===
See footnote

=== 2011 ===
See footnote

=== 2012 & 2013 ===
See footnote

=== 2014 ===
Peter Friedmann, executive director, Agriculture Transportation Coalition

Jorn Hinge, president and chief executive officer, United Arab Shipping Company (S.A.G.)

Carol Notias Lambos, partner, The Lambos Firm, LLP

Lambros C. Varnavides, managing director and global head of shipping, Royal Bank of Scotland

Wolf von Appen, president, Ultramar Agencia Maritima Ltda., and chairman, Grupo Ultramar

=== 2016 ===
C. Duff Hughes, president, The Vane Brothers Company

Simeon P. Palios, chairman and CEO, Diana Shipping, Inc.

Robert P. (Rob) Kusiciel, vice president of logistics & transportation, Center of Excellence, Honeywell International, Inc.

William (Bill) Payne, vice chairman, NYK Line (NA), Inc. and vice president, NYK Ports, LLC.

Christopher J. Wiernicki, chairman, CEO and president, American Bureau of Shipping, Inc.

=== 2017 ===
Jean-Jacques (JJ) Ruest, executive vice-president and chief marketing officer, Canadian National Railway Company

Harley V. Franco, chairman and chief executive officer, Harley Marine Services

Angeliki N. Frangou, chairman and chief executive officer, Navios Maritime Holdings Inc.

James C. McKenna, president and chief executive officer, Pacific Maritime Association

Madeleine Paquin, president and chief executive officer, Logistec Corporation

=== 2018 ===
Michael A. Jordan, founding principal and technical direction, Liftech

Donato Caruso, of counsel, The Lambos Firm, LLP

Adam M. Goldstein, vice chairman, Royal Caribbean Cruises Ltd

Juergen Pump, president for North America, Hamburg Süd

=== 2019 ===
Harold J. Daggett, international president, International Longshoremen’s Association, AFL-CIO

George Economou, founder, chairman, CEO, DryShips Inc.

John F. Reinhart, chief executive officer, executive director, Virginia Port Authority

Rodolphe J. Saadé, chairman and chief executive officer, CMA CGM S.A.

Richard S. (Rich) Weeks, president and chief executive officer, Weeks Marine, Inc.

=== 2020 ===
Lisa Lutoff-Perlo, president and CEO, Celebrity Cruises Inc.

James R. Mara, president emeritus, Metropolitan Marine Maintenance Contractors’ Association

James I. Newsome III, president and CEO, South Carolina Ports Authority

Dr. Nikolas P. Tsakos, president and CEO, Tsakos Energy Navigation Corp.

Lois K. Zabrocky, president and CEO, International Seaways Inc.

=== 2021 ===
James Angelo Ruggieri, Eur Ing, General Machine Corp.

Larry Wilkerson, United States Coast Guard

== Similar Halls ==
- Delaware Maritime Hall of Fame
- National Maritime Hall of Fame
