= Amina Al Rustamani =

Emirati businesswoman

Dr. Amina Abdulwahed Hassan AlRustamani
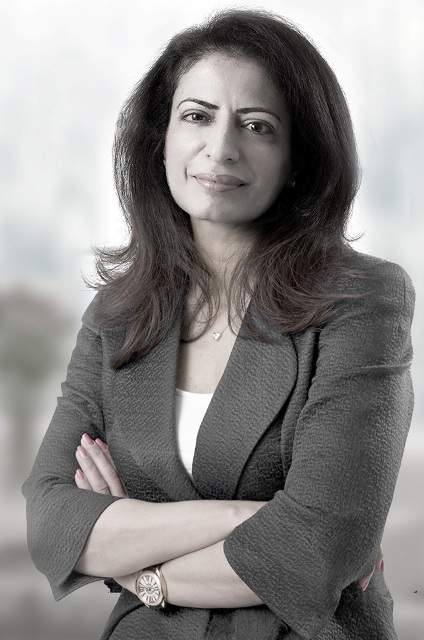
- Education: PhD in Communication and Engineering from George Washington University's School of Engineering and Applied Sciences
- Occupations: CEO of AWR Properties, Director and Board Member of AW Rostamani Group, Board Member of Dubai Healthcare City Authority and Noor Bank

Amina Abdulwahed Hassan AlRustamani is an Emirati businesswoman who's currently the director of family business AW Rostamani Group. She ranked number 9 in the CEO Middle East's fifth annual list of the world's most powerful Arab women in 2015. She was picked as the Advertising Person of the Year by Dubai Lynx for 2015.

Al Rustamani started her career in Dubai in 2001 as an electrical engineer with TECOM Investments (now TECOM Group). She received her bachelor's, master's and doctoral degrees in electrical engineering from The George Washington University in 1993, 1996, and 2001, respectively. Amina was involved in the development of Dubai Design District and Dubai Wholesale City.

Al Rustamani left TECOM Group in February 2018 to take up the position as Chief Operating Officer of the AW Rostamani Group. She was listed as number 20 in Forbes "Middle East Power Businesswomen 2021."

== Career (current) ==
- Chief Executive Officer of AWR Properties
- Chief Operating Officer and board member of AW Rostamani Group
- Board Member of Dubai Healthcare City Authority
- Board Member of Noor Bank
- Board Member of HSBC Bank Middle East

== Career (former) ==
- Group Chief Executive Officer of TECOM Group
- Chairperson of the Dubai Design and Fashion Council
- Member of the Board, Dubai Media Incorporated
- Member of the Board, National Media Council
- Member of the Board, Emirates Central Cooling Systems Corporation (Empower)
