= Stanley Crane =

American railroad executive

Leo Stanley Crane
- Born: September 7, 1915; Cincinnati, Ohio, U.S.
- Died: July 15, 2003 (aged 87); Boynton Beach, Florida, U.S.
- Education: The George Washington University
- Occupation: Railroad executive
- Known for: Consolidated Rail Corporation

Leo Stanley Crane (September 7, 1915 – July 15, 2003) was a railroad executive who was CEO of Southern Railway. Trained as a chemical engineer, Crane was elected to the National Academy of Engineering in 1978. After retiring from Southern Railway, he worked for Conrail where he later endowed the L. Stanley Crane Chair of engineering in applied sciences at his alma mater, George Washington University.

== Career ==
He graduated from The George Washington University with a chemical engineering degree in 1938. He began his career with Southern Railway, and worked for the railroad, except for a stint from 1959 to 1961 with the Pennsylvania Railroad, until reaching the company's mandatory retirement age in 1980. He was elected a member of the National Academy of Engineering in 1978.

Crane went to Conrail in 1981 after a distinguished career that had seen him rise to the position of CEO at the Southern Railway.

=== With Conrail ===
Crane went to Conrail in 1981, where he presided over the turnaround of the deficit-plagued railroad, which began turning a profit as a result of Staggers Act freedoms and its own managerial improvements under his leadership. While the Staggers Act helped immensely in allowing all railroads to more easily abandon unprofitable rail lines and set their own freight rates, it was under Crane's leadership that Conrail truly became a profitable operation. In the two years after he took office in 1981 he shed 4,400 miles from the Conrail system, which accounted for only 1% of the railroad's overall traffic and 2% of its profits while saving it millions of dollars in maintenance costs.

In 1983, Crane began a five-year battle with Transportation Secretary Elizabeth H. Dole to hold onto Conrail. Crane was an outspoken critic of Dole's proposal to sell the rail system to Norfolk Southern Corporation, and fought for a public stock offering to return the railroad to the private sector. In November 1986, Crane delivered a check for $200 million to President Ronald Reagan. By that spring, Conrail paid an additional $100 million to the government. In March 1987, the government sold Conrail in a public stock offering. Investors on the New York Stock Exchange quickly snapped up 58,750,000 shares of Conrail; the sale netted $1.58 billion. Crane later saw Conrail sold to two rival bidders, Norfolk Southern and CSX, for more than $10 billion (five times the price for which the Reagan Administration had been willing to sell the railroad).

In 1989, Conrail established the L. Stanley Crane chair professorship in the College of Engineering at The George Washington University. The endowed L. Stanley Crane professorship of engineering in applied science was first held by GWU's former engineering dean Harold Liebowitz (1989-1991) and then by the chair of Computer Science Roger H. Lang (1991–present). was amongst the first three fellows elected to the Society of Engineering Science in 1975 together with Ahmed Cemal Eringen and Warren P. Mason.

== Personal life ==
In 1962, Crane married Jean Eward. They had twins, Pamela and Penelope. That marriage ended in divorce in 1976. Jean Crane died in 1998. Stanley Crane was married to Joan McCoy from 1976 to 1999. He died of pneumonia on July 15, 2003, at a hospice in Boynton Beach, Florida. He was 87. Crane is buried in the Fort Lincoln Cemetery, Maryland.

Business positions
Preceded by W. Graham Claytor, Jr.	L. Stanley Crane; President of Southern Railway; 1977–1980	Succeeded by Harold H. Hall
Preceded by Edward G. Jordan	L. Stanley Crane; Chairman of Conrail; 1981–1988	Succeeded by Richard D. Sanborn
Awards
Preceded by James W. Germany (SP)	Modern Railways magazine's Man of the Year; 1974	Succeeded by Frank E. Barnett (UP)
Preceded by A. Paul Funkhouser (FL)	Modern Railways magazine's Man of the Year; 1983	Succeeded by Hays T. Watkins (CSX)

== See also ==
- List of members of the National Academy of Engineering (Industrial, manufacturing, and operational systems)
- Walkway over the Hudson
