= Dubai Film and TV Commission =

Emirate of Dubai Dubai Film and TV Commission (DFTC)
Agency overview
- Jurisdiction: Emirate of Dubai
- Headquarters: Dubai
- Agency executives: Jamal Al Sharif, CEO; Saeed Aljanahi, Director - Operations DFTC
- Website: www.filmdubai.gov.ae

Dubai Film and TV Commission (DFTC), authorizes audio and visual media production permits for TV, film and commercials in Dubai. The Commission is also mandated to increase local production and attract international players from both the film and TV sectors. DFTC has been founded on the ethos that the film and TV industry has a high multiplier effect on the macro economy, impacting the tourism, transportation, storage, financial services and construction sectors and ultimately contributing to an increase in the overall GDP of the United Arab Emirates. The Commission works closely with government entities, owners of shooting locations and other stakeholders to help production units have a seamless and cost-effective filming experience in Dubai.

On 19 July 2012, the first meeting of DFTC was held in Dubai. DFTC itself was officially set-up on 28 May 2012 through an official decree.

DFTC along with Oliver Wyman issued a whitepaper in 2013, titled: Opportunities and Challenges in the Middle East and North Africa production market.

Among the feature films shoots facilitated by DFTC in Dubai, Star Trek Beyond, which filmed in key indoor and outdoor locations in Dubai in October 2015, had the biggest budget of any film to shoot in the emirate. Mission: Impossible - Ghost Protocol, which filmed in Dubai in 2011 was the costliest project, prior to this.

In 2022, The Dubai Film and TV Commission and several prominent Bollywood studios have collaborated to establish an initiative called 'Ticket to Bollywood'. The aim of this program is to assist Emirati screenwriters in their professional development.

== Board ==
=== CEO ===
Jamal Al Sharif is the CEO of Dubai Film and TV Commission

=== Members ===
- Issam AbdulRahim Kazim, Chief Executive Officer, Dubai Corporation for Tourism and Commerce Marketing
- Mohammed Shael Al Saadi, Chief Executive Officer, Business Registration and Licensing (BRL) sector, Department of Economic Development (DED), Government of Dubai
- Boutros Boutros, Divisional Senior Vice President, Corporate Communications, Emirates & The Emirates Group
- Ahmed Abdulla Al Emadi, Director of TV and Head media production, Dubai Municipality
