= AW Rostamani Group =

Privately held company

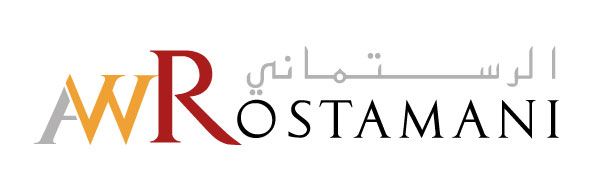
- Type: Privately held company (PJSC)
- Founded: 1954; 72 years ago
- Founder: Late Abdul Wahid Al Rostamani
- Headquarters: Dubai, United Arab Emirates
- Key people: Late Abdul Wahid Al Rostamani (Chairman); Michel Ayat (CEO AAC); Khalid Al Rostamani (Chairman)
- Services: automobiles sales and service, real estate, logistics, lighting and travel, trading, luxury and retail
- Number of employees: 3,800
- Website: www.awrostamani.com

AW Rostamani Group (AWR) is a privately held company established in 1954 in Dubai, United Arab Emirates, by Al Rostamani brothers, Abdullah and Abdul Wahid. The company is headquartered in Dubai and employs over 4,000 workers. The Group operates in seven diverse sectors: automotive, real estate, logistics, retail, lighting, travel and agritech.

== History ==
Abdul Wahid Al Rostamani

AW Rostamani began in 1951 when Abdul Wahid and his brother Abdullah Hassan, two sons of a local pearl trader, set up a family business on the shore of the Dubai Creek. Inspired by their passion for reading, the Al Rostamani brothers opened Dubai's first bookshop, Al Ahliya Library, in 1954, importing sought-after books from Egypt, Syria, and Lebanon by Gulf Air through Bahrain.

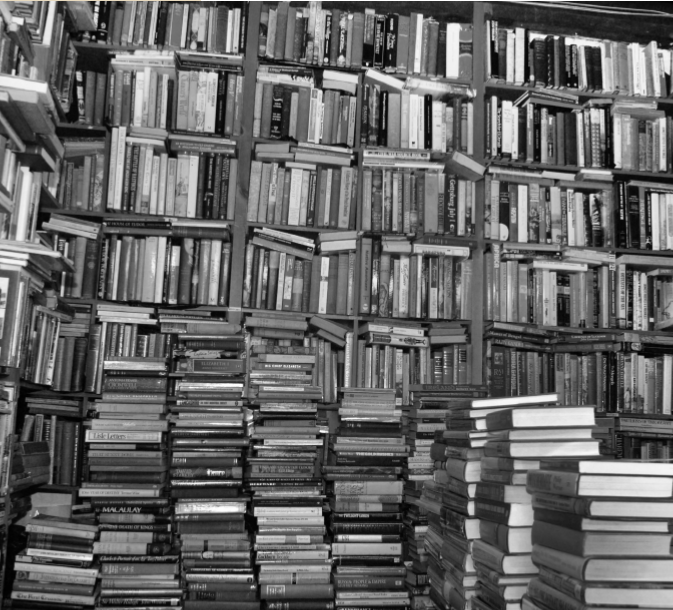
AW Rostamani Bookstore

== Milestones ==
- 1957 General Trading company is established.
- 2011 AW Rostamani Arabian Automobiles is the first automotive company in the region to implement a Customer Loyalty Program (Nissan Road Miles). AW Rostamani Trading appointed as the sole distributor of ZNA cars and genuine ZNA parts in Oman.
- 2015 GE Lighting signs a partnership agreement with AW Rostamani Lumina.
- 2016 AW Rostamani Lifestyle expands retail stores with the launch of Georg Jensen, Graffiti Fashion Zone and Apartment 51.
- 2017 AW Rostamani sets up shop for multi brand secondhand cars.
- 2019 Hilton signs an agreement with AW Rostamani Group to develop a DoubleTree by Hilton hotel in Bur Dubai.

== Key People ==
Khalid Abdul Wahid Al Rostamani is the Chairman of AW Rostamani.

Amina Al Rustamani is the Director and Board Member of AW Rostamani Group, and the Chief Executive Officer of AWR Properties.

Since 1990 Michel Ayat heads the Automotive division of AW Rostamani that consists of Arabian Automobiles, AW Rostamani Trading, Certified Pre-owned and Shift Car Rental.

== Group Companies ==
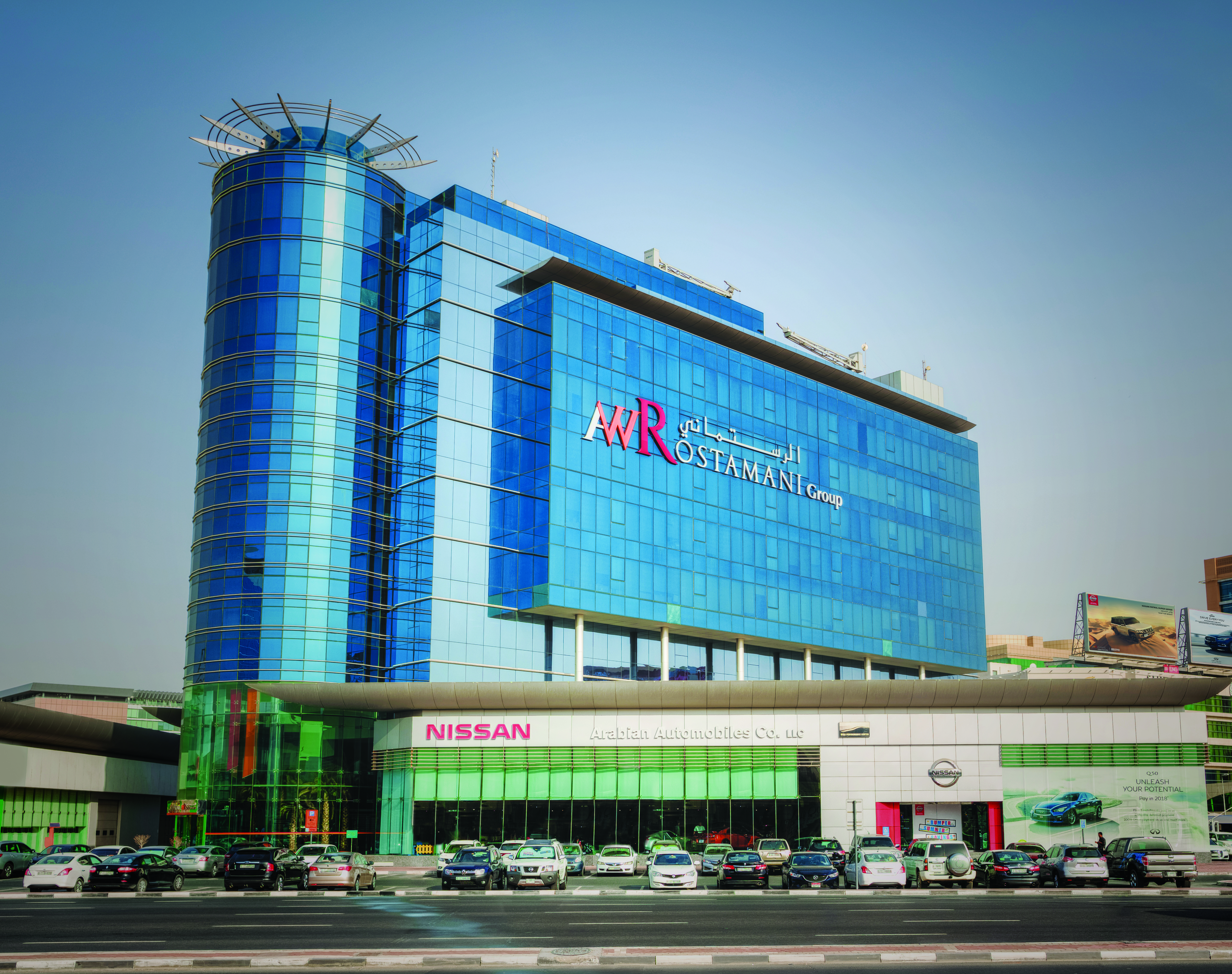
AW Rostamani Head Office

=== AWR Properties ===
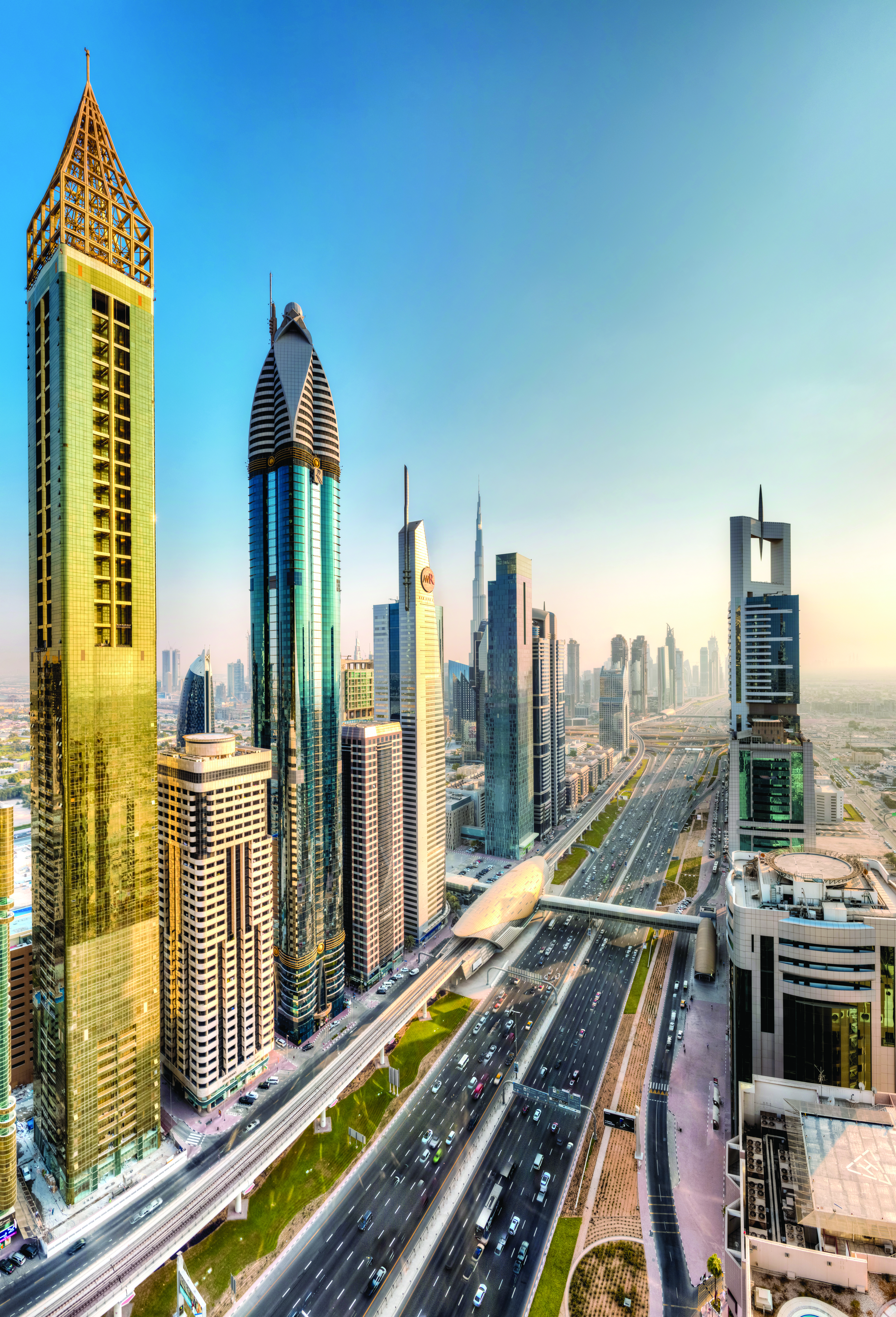
AW Rostamani Real Estate

AWR Properties has developed a portfolio of property since 1982. The real estate arm of the Group is split into Property Development, Leasing and Facilities Management of both commercial and residential units alongside retail. It handles over 2.5 million sq. ft. of residential and commercial space in the UAE. It is responsible for the development of the 21st Century Tower on Sheikh Zayed Road and the AW Rostamani head office building in Deira.

Mankhool AWR Properties comprises 327 hotel rooms, ten floors of commercial offices and 182 units of residential rooms. Established properties in the commercial division include vehicle sales showrooms for Nissan, Infiniti and Renault.

=== Arabian Automobiles ===
Established in 1968, they are the exclusive distributors of Nissan, INFINITI, and Renault, in Dubai and the Northern Emirates. The company operates a large network of showrooms, service centers, spare parts outlets, and a "certified pre-owned division" across Dubai.

=== Prime Honda ===
A wholly owned subsidiary of the AW Rostamani Group, Prime Honda is the authorised Honda dealer in India.

=== AW Rostamani Trading ===
AW Rostamani Trading, an ISO 9001:2008 certified company, with brands such as TOTAL lubricants, Ceat Tyres, Sava Tyres, Amaron batteries, Fortron Automotive Treatments and XCool heat control films in the UAE.

=== Shift Car Rental ===
The fleet currently stands at 13,000 vehicles, supplies Nissan, INFINITI and Renault models on short and long-term lease.

=== AUTOTRUST ===
AUTOTRUST is a multi-brand car service company in the UAE that provides repair, service, and sales of certified pre-owned cars. The company operates three workshops, located in Abu Dhabi, Dubai and Sharjah.

=== AW Rostamani Lifestyle ===
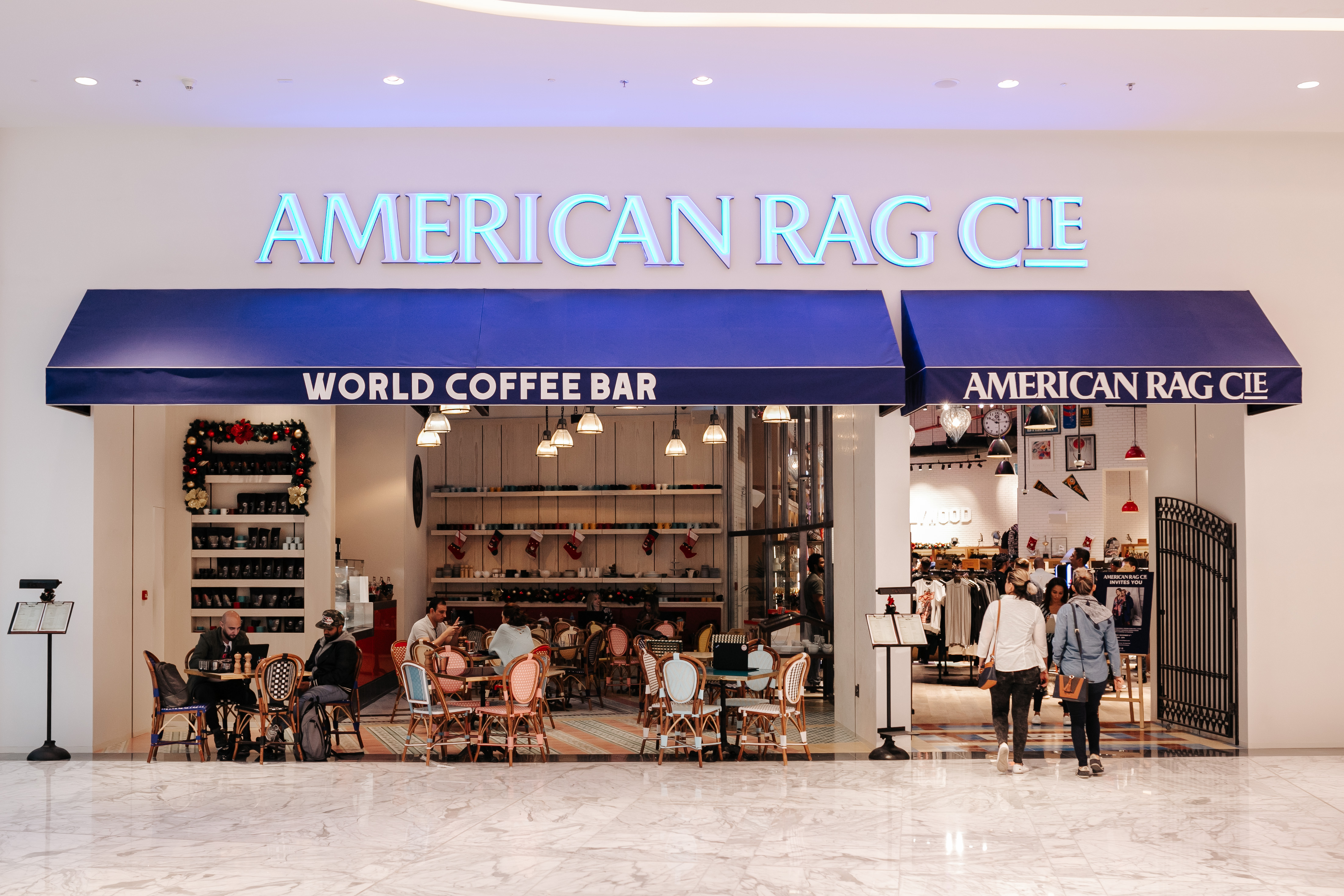
American Rag Cie Store

AW Rostamani Lifestyle, started in the year 2012. AW Rostamani Lifestyle are into fashion, jewelry and homeware sectors regionally, with a portfolio that includes international and regional brands such as Georg Jensen, Graffiti, Vhernier, Angels, Apartment 51 and American Rag.

AW Rostamani Lifestyle is the Vhernier brand agent in the UAE. Vhernier is an Italian jewellery store.

Launched in Dubai Mall in 2015, Graffiti is a kid's fashion store.

Angels is a designer children's-wear chain with 4 stores in Dubai. They are a multi-brand kids wear concept specializing in luxury garments and accessories for boys and girls.

Georg Jensen A/S (originally Georg Jensens Sølvsmedie A/S) is a Danish designer company with focus on silverware. It was founded by famed silversmith Georg Jensen in 1904. Georg Jensen first store in the UAE was opened in April 2016 at City Walk, Dubai.

American lifestyle multi-brand retail American Rag Cie opened in Dubai Mall in September 2018. The brand's Dubai venture is in partnership with AW Rostamani Lifestyle, exclusive licensee for the MENA region.

The Apartment 51 brand is a concept store in Dubai.

=== KAR Freight, Forwarding & Transport ===
KAR Transport is a land transportation service provider based in Dubai that manages the national and regional supply chain operations for Arabian Automobiles and AW Rostamani Trading. Operating principally in the UAE and the GCC, KAR Transport maintains a network of international partners across the Middle Eastern countries.

=== AWR Lumina ===
Incorporated in 1999, AWR Lumina is a provider of lighting products in UAE. AW Rostamani Lumina delivers lighting products to largescale hospitality, retail and commercial developments with presence in 22 countries across Africa, Middle East, and Asia.
