= Dubai Design and Fashion Council =

UAE government agency, 2013–2021

The Dubai Design and Fashion Council (DDFC) was set up in 2013 to foster the development of the design and fashion industry in Dubai. It was dissolved in May 2021.

== History ==
The Dubai Design and Fashion Council was established as per Decree No. (23) of 2013 issued by Vice President and Prime Minister and ruler of Dubai, Sheikh Mohammed bin Rashid Al Maktoum.

In October 2015, the Council released the MENA Design Outlook 2015 Report, offering a comprehensive analysis of the Middle East's design industry. In May 2016, it released the MENA Design Education Outlook Report, which provides an insight into the design education landscape of the MENA region. The MENA Design Education Outlook focuses on six key design markets in the region including the UAE, Qatar, Lebanon, Jordan, and Kuwait.

In November 2016, Nez Gebreel stepped down as CEO of the council after a two-year tenure. In February 2017, Jazia Al Dhanhani was appointed CEO. In May 2021, after a government shake-up, the Dubai Design and Fashion Council was dissolved (decree 14).

== Activities ==
The council was set up as a joint effort of the Dubai Executive Council and (Dubai Creative Clusters Authority) to develop a road map for the design and fashion industry. One of the council's initial mandates was to deliver a comprehensive strategy outlining and guiding the growth and development of Dubai's fashion industry.

The Council helps connect talent to their core market through guidance and access to the best business minds in the creative industry. It supports designers in putting together the business model, attracting funds, and sourcing manufacturing and production units. Members of the Council board — a mix of corporate and creative individuals — are on hand to help. The council also works towards developing Intellectual Property laws in the region and implementing them through educating its members and the community.

Part of the council's mandate is also to start a design school in the region.
