= Economy of Lithuania =

- Vilnius Central Business District
- Currency: Euro (EUR, €)
- Fiscal year: Calendar year
- Trade organisations: EU, WTO, OECD
- Country group: Advanced economy; High-income economy; Largest Baltic economy

Statistics
- Population: ▼2,886,883 (2026)
- GDP: ▲€84.061 billion (nominal, 2025); $105.907 billion (nominal, 2026 est.); $176.929 billion (PPP, 2026 est.)
- GDP rank: 77th (nominal, 2026); 87th (PPP, 2026)
- GDP growth: 3.03% (2024); 2.92% (2025)
- GDP per capita: ▲€29,167 (nominal, 2025); $36,545 (nominal, 2026 est.); $61,052 (PPP, 2026 est.)
- GDP per capita rank: 40th (nominal, 2025); 34th (PPP, 2025)
- GDP by sector: agriculture: 1.38%; industry: 28.5%; services: 68.3%; (2017)
- Inflation (CPI): 3.4% (2025)
- Population below national poverty line: ▲22.6% – monthly income below €699 (2025); ▲25.8% at risk (AROPE, 2024)
- Gini coefficient: 35.5 medium (2025, Eurostat)
- Human Development Index: ▲0.895 very high (2023) (37th); ▼0.795 high IHDI (39th) (2022)
- Corruption Perceptions Index: ▲63 out of 100 points (2024) (32nd)
- Labour force: ▼1,462,800 (2025); ▼78.5% employment rate (2023)
- Labour force by occupation: agriculture: 1.83%; industry: 24.42%; services: 73.75%; (2025) (Note: Criteria does not include farmers or self-employed activities.)
- Unemployment: ▼6.9% (2025); ▲15.9% youth unemployment (15 to 24 year-olds; January 2026)
- Average gross salary: €2,554.2 per month (2026 Q1)
- Average net salary: €1,557.4 per month (2026 Q1)
- Main industries: Food & tobacco processing, petroleum refining, chemicals, furniture, energy supply, metalworking, other woodworking, electrical & optical manufacturing, plastics.

External
- Exports: ▲€36.864 billion (2025)
- Export goods: Refined petroleum, furniture, wheat, vehicles and their parts, plastics, machinery, electrical machinery and equipment, wood
- Main export partners: Latvia 10.8%; Poland 8.22%; Germany 6.91%; Netherlands 5.83%; Russia 5.66%; United States 5.38%; Belarus 4.49%; United Kingdom 3.95%; (2023)
- Imports: ▲€43.39 billion (2025)
- Import goods: Crude petroleum and petroleum gas, vehicles and their parts, machinery, packaged medicaments, electrical machinery and equipment, plastics, iron and steel
- Main import partners: Germany 12.9%; Poland 12.7%; Latvia 8.09%; United States 6.77%; Norway 5.28%; Netherlands 5.22%; Saudi Arabia 4.67%; (2023)
- FDI stock: ▲€29.74 billion (31 December 2022); ▲ Abroad: €10.58 billion (31 December 2022)
- Current account: ▲$364 million (2017 est.)
- Gross external debt: ▲$34.48 billion (31 March 2016 est.)

Public finance
- Government debt: ▲40.5% of GDP (2025); ▲€27.558 billion (2023)
- Foreign reserves: ▼€6.206 billion (March 2026)
- Budget balance: €509 million deficit (2023); -0.7% of GDP (2023)
- Revenue: 36.7% of GDP (2023)
- Spending: 37.4% of GDP (2023)
- Economic aid: €6.8 billion from European Structural and Investment Funds (2007–2013); €8.39 billion from European Structural and Investment Funds (2014–2020); €6.4 billion from European Structural and Investment Funds (2021–2027); €2.25 billion from Next Generation EU (2022–2027)
- Credit rating: Standard & Poor's: A (long-term); A-1 (Domestic) (short-term); A-1 (Foreign) (short-term); AAA (T&C Assessment); Outlook: Stable; Moody's: A2 (long-term); (P)P-2 (short-term); Outlook: Stable; Fitch: A (long-term); F1+ (short-term); AAA (Country Ceiling); Outlook: Stable; Morningstar DBRS; A (high) (long-term); Outlook: Stable; Scope: A+ (long-term rating); S-1+ (short-term rating); Outlook: Stable
- All values, unless otherwise stated, are in US dollars.

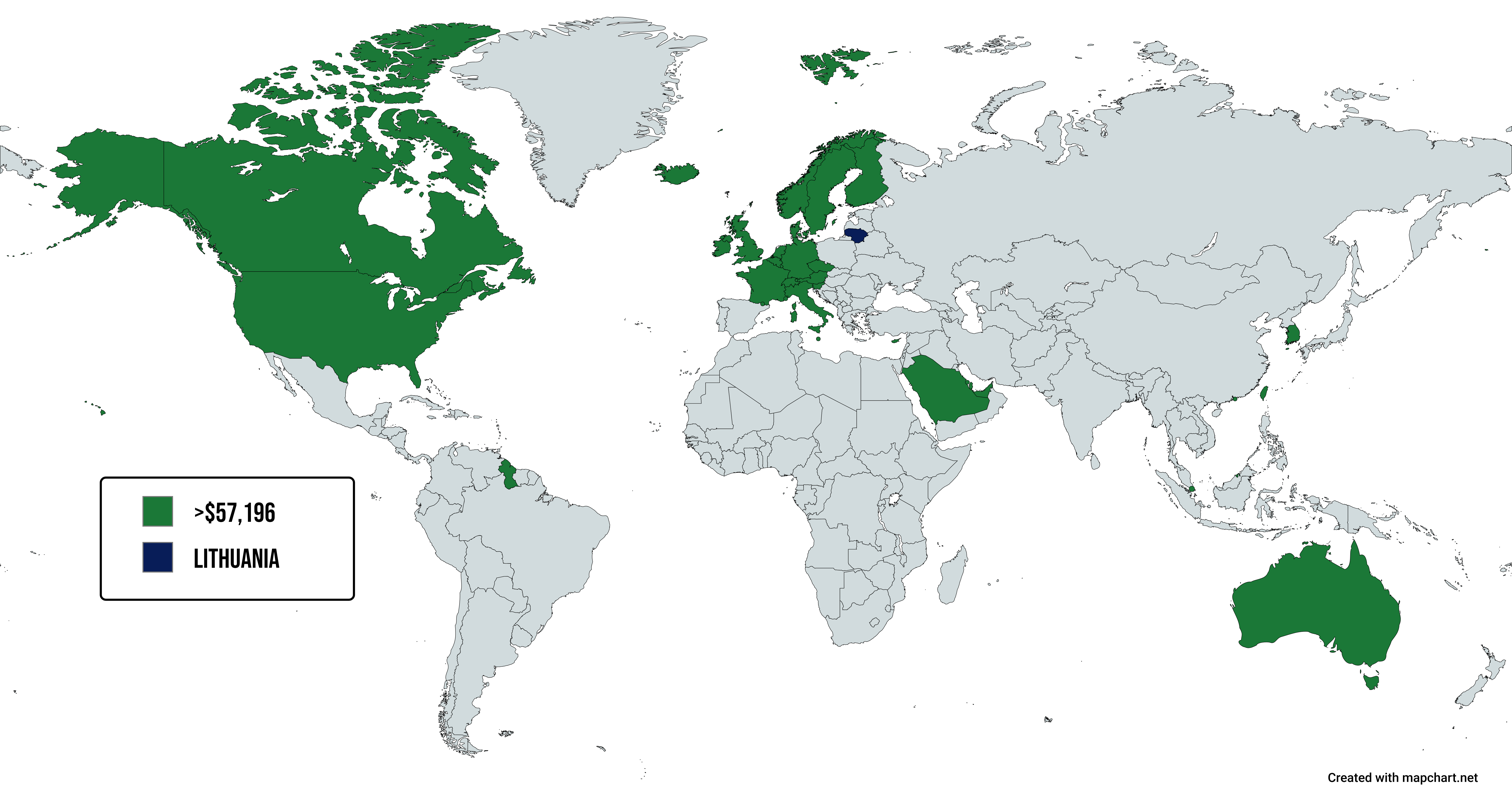
Countries by GDP per capita (PPP) larger than Lithuania (2025)

Lithuania is the largest and most diversified economy among the three Baltic states and as of 2026 with the economy slightly larger than that of Latvia and Estonia combined (both nominal and PPP). It is a member of the European Union and belongs to the group of very high human development countries and is a member of the WTO and OECD.

In the 1990s, Lithuania rapidly moved from a centrally planned economy to a market economy, implementing numerous liberal reforms. It enjoyed high growth rates after joining the European Union along with the other Baltic states, leading to the notion of a Baltic Tiger. Lithuania's economy (GDP) grew more than 500 percent since regaining independence in 1990. The Baltic states have a combined workforce of 3.3 million people, with 1.5 million of these working people living in Lithuania.

The country is one of the fastest growing economies in the EU. GDP growth reached its peak in 2008, and was approaching the same levels again in 2018. Similar to the other Baltic States, the Lithuanian economy suffered a deep recession in 2009, with GDP falling by almost 15%. After this severe recession, the country's economy started to show signs of recovery already in the 3rd quarter of 2009. It returned to growth in 2010, with a positive 1.3 outcome and with 6.6 per cent growth during the first half of 2011. GDP growth had resumed in 2010, albeit at a slower pace than before the crisis. The success of the crisis taming is attributed to the austerity policy of the Lithuanian government.

Lithuania has a sound fiscal position. The 2017 budget resulted in a 0.5% surplus, with the gross debt stabilising at around 40% of the GDP. The budget remained positive in 2017, and was expected to continue to do so in 2018.

Foreign direct investment into Lithuania has been spiking every year since 2015, with significant increases in 2020s, reaching its highest ever recorded number in 2023. On average, around 80% of all foreign direct investment in Lithuania comes from European Union countries. Sweden was historically the largest investor with 20% – 30% of all FDI in Lithuania, but it has been overtaken by Germany, the Netherlands and even Estonia in the 2010s. In 2017, Lithuania was the third country, after the Republic of Ireland and Singapore by the average job value of investment projects. Lithuania is ranked 11th in the world in the Ease of Doing Business Index prepared by the World Bank Group, 16th out of 178 countries in the Index of Economic Freedom, measured by The Heritage Foundation and 8th out of 165 countries in the Economic Freedom of the World 2021 by Fraser Institute.

Based on OECD data, Lithuania is among the top 5 countries in the world by postsecondary (tertiary) education attainment. This educated workforce attracted investments, especially in the ICT sector during the past years. The Lithuanian government and the Bank of Lithuania simplified procedures for obtaining licences for the activities of e-money and payment institutions. positioning the country as one of the most attractive for the financial technology initiatives in the EU.

== History of economy ==
The history of Lithuania can be divided into seven major periods. All the periods have some interesting and important facts that affected the economic situation of the country in those times.

- Ancient times – Baltic tribes (until the 13th century)
- Kingdom of Lithuania (1251–1263)
- Grand Duchy of Lithuania (1263–1569)
- Polish–Lithuanian Commonwealth (1569–1795)
- Pressure of the Russian Empire (1795–1914)
- Republic of Lithuania during the interwar period (1918–1940)
- Lithuanian Soviet Socialist Republic (1944–1990)
- Republic of Lithuania (1990–)

=== History up to the 20th century ===
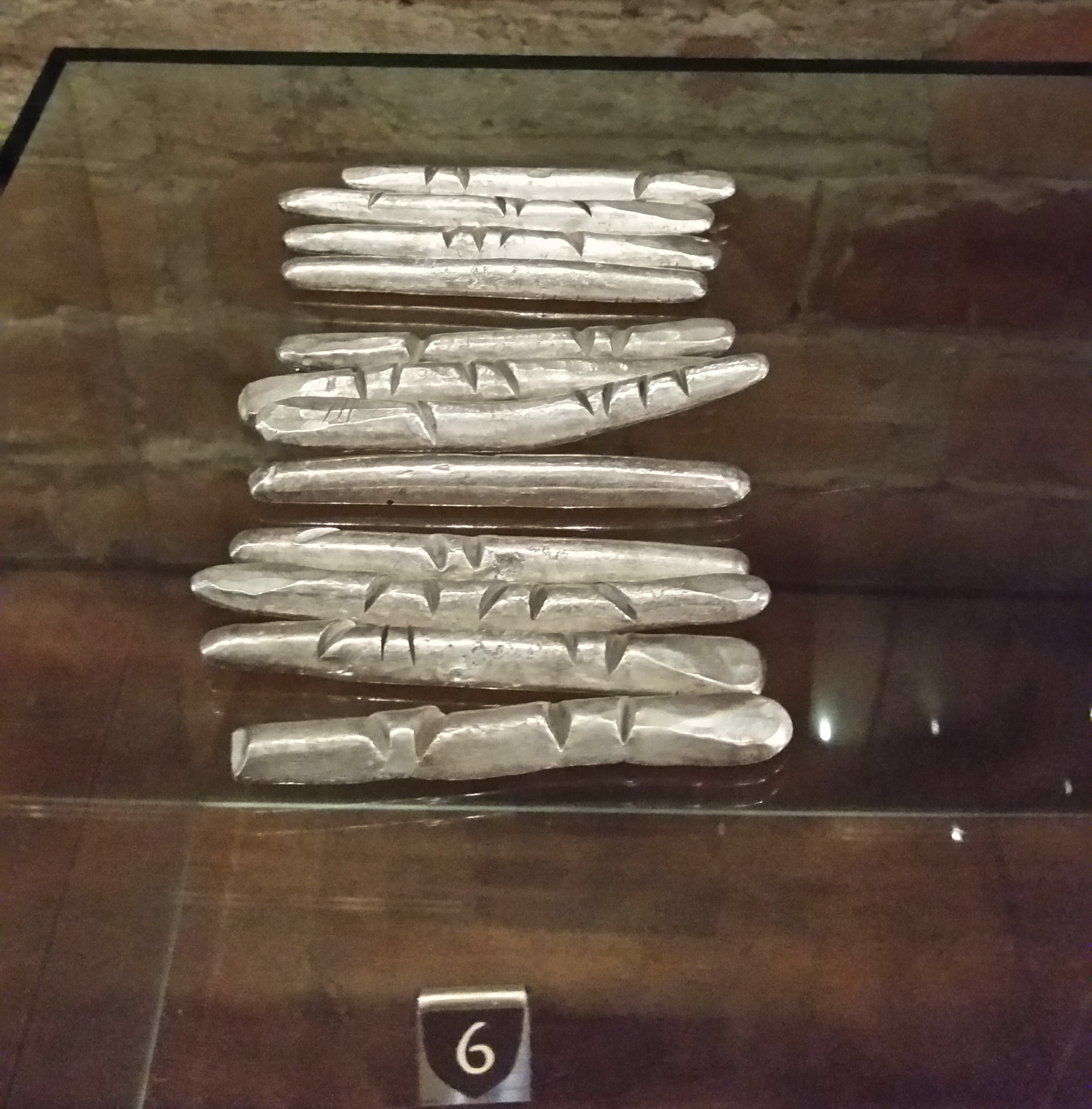
Lithuanian long silver currency, 12th–15th centuries

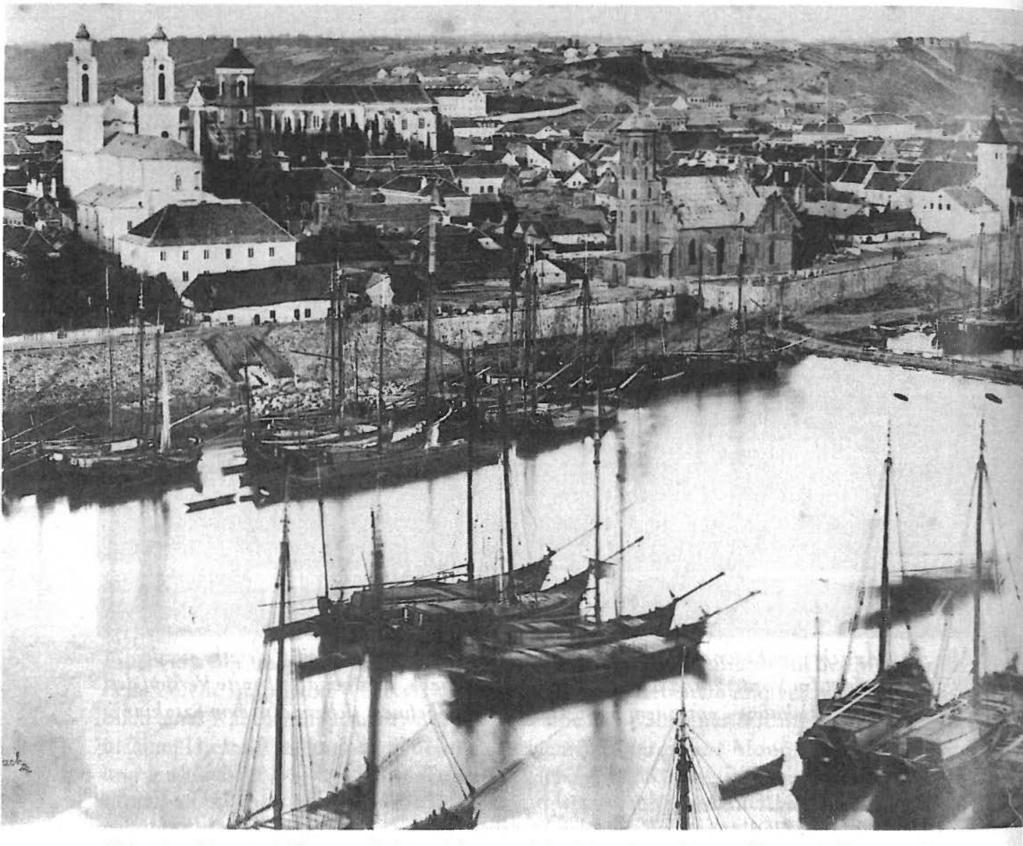
Various types of trade ships in Nemunas near Kaunas, 19th century

The first Lithuanians formed a branch of an ancient ethno-linguistic group known as the Balts. Up to the 4th century, Lithuanian tribes maintained close trade contacts with the Roman Empire via Aquileia processing center and Carnuntum. Amber was the main good provided to the Roman Empire from Baltic Sea coast, via a long route called the Amber Road.

Afterwards, the trading ties persisted with the central European tribes, fostering a consistent exchange of goods. Alongside the most prized commodity of amber, items such as leathers, furs, beeswax, and limited agricultural products were among the other traded commodities. The connections can be seen through the shared name for amber - the Hungarian gyanta, gyantar are closely related to the Lithuanian gintaras. It's still debated which language group could have loaned the word from another.

Consolidation of the Lithuanian lands began in the late 12th century. King Mindaugas was the first Catholic King of Lithuania in 1253. The expansion of the Grand Duchy of Lithuania reached its height in the middle of the 14th century under the Grand Duke Gediminas (reigned 1316–1341), who established a strong central government which later came to dominate the territories from the Baltic Sea to the Black Sea. Grand Duke Gediminas issued letters to the Hanseatic league, offering free access to his domains for men of every order and profession from nobles and knights to tillers of the soil. Economic immigrants and immigrants, seeking religious freedom improved the level of handicrafts. During the reign of Duke Kęstutis (1297–1382), the first cash taxes were introduced, although most taxes were still paid in goods (e.g., wheat, cattle, horses).

In 1569 the Polish–Lithuanian Commonwealth formed through the union of the Kingdom of Poland and the Grand Duchy of Lithuania. The economy of the Commonwealth was dominated by feudal agriculture based on the exploitation of the agricultural workforce (serfs). Poland–Lithuania played a significant role in supplying 16th-century Western Europe with exports of three sorts of goods: grain (rye), cattle (oxen) and fur. These three articles amounted to nearly 90% of the country's exports to western markets by overland and maritime trade. There was even a Lithuanian trading vessel – vytinė, used for four hundred years to transport grain via Nemunas river. Statutes of Lithuania were the main collections of law statements and rules for nearly three centuries since being published in 1529.

The Commonwealth was famous for Europe's first and the world's second modern codified national constitution, the so-called Constitution of 3 May, declared on 3 May 1791 (after the 1788 ratification of the United States Constitution). Economic and commercial reforms, previously shunned as unimportant by the Szlachta, were introduced, and the development of industries was encouraged.

Following the partitions of the Polish–Lithuanian Commonwealth in 1772, 1793 and 1795, the Russian Empire controlled the majority of Lithuania. During the administration of the Lithuanian lands by the Russian Empire from 1772 to 1917, one of the most important events that affected economic relations was the emancipation reform of 1861 in Russia. The reform amounted to the liquidation of serf dependence previously suffered by peasants; it boosted the development of capitalism. However, Lithuania, as did its neighbouring provinces, remained an agricultural supplier for the post Industrial Revolution European markets.

=== Lithuania in the 20th century ===
Lithuania had stagnant economic growth in the interwar period (1919–1940). Its GDP growth resembled newly established agricultureal states such as Estonia and Poland. Lithuania's economy did not undergo contraction during the Great Depression. The Lithuanian economy collapsed during World War II and recovered after the end of the war. The economy stagnated from the 1970s to the 1990s.

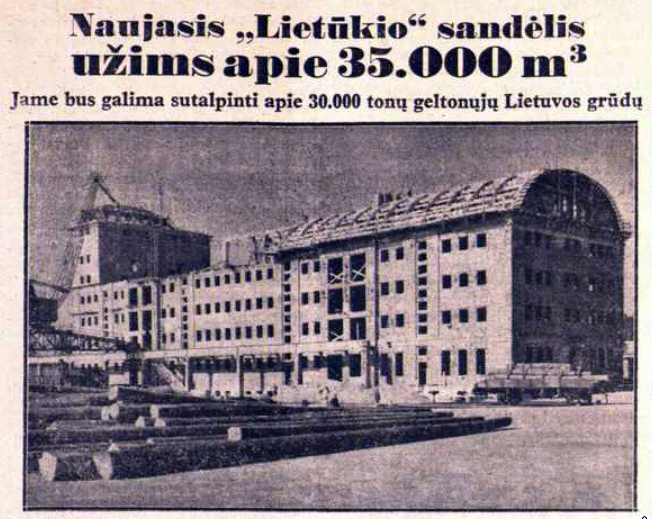
Construction of Lietūkis agricultural cooperative's warehouse in Klaipėda

On 16 February 1918, the Council of Lithuania passed a resolution for the re-establishment of the Independent State of Lithuania. Soon, many economic reforms for sustainable economic growth were implemented. A national currency, called the Lithuanian litas, was introduced in 1922. It proved to become one of the strongest and most stable currencies in Europe during the inter-war period. Lithuania had a monometalism system where one litas was covered by 0.150462 grams of gold stored by the Bank of Lithuania in foreign countries. Litas remained stable even in the period of Great Depression. During the time of its independence, 1918–1940, Lithuania made substantial progress. For example, Lithuania was the third-ranking flax producer and exporter in the world market (export of flax constituted about 30 percent of all export share), being surpassed only by Soviet Russia and Poland; Lithuanian farm products such as meat, dairy products, many kinds of grain, potatoes, etc. were of superior quality in the world market. Lithuanian farmers were joining into cooperative companies – e.g. Lietūkis, Pienocentras, Linas, which helped farmers to process and sell their products more efficiently and profitably.

Having taken advantage of favorable international developments, and driven by its foreign policy aims directed against Lithuanian statehood, the Union of Soviet Socialist Republics (USSR) occupied Lithuania in 1940. Land and the most important objects for the economy were nationalized, and most of the farms collectivized. Just after one year of occupation, poverty level, unemployment increased dramatically, lack of food products appeared. Later, many inefficient factories and industry companies, highly dependent on other regions of USSR, were established in Lithuania. Despite that, in 1990, GDP per capita of the Lithuanian Soviet Socialist Republic was $8,591, which was above the average for the rest of the Soviet Union of $6,871 but lagging behind developed western countries.

The Soviet era brought Lithuania intensive industrialization and economic integration into the USSR, although the level of technology and state concern for environmental, health, and labor issues lagged far behind Western standards. Urbanization increased from 39% in 1959 to 68% in 1989. From 1949 to 1952 the Soviets abolished private ownership in agriculture, establishing collective and state farms. Production declined and did not reach pre-war levels until the early 1960s. The intensification of agricultural production through intense chemical use and mechanization eventually doubled production but created additional ecological problems. This changed after independence, when farm production dropped due to difficulties in restructuring the agricultural sector.

The overall damage, resulted from the Soviet occupation (including the loss of gross domestic product), estimated according to the UN recognised methodologies amounted to approximately US$800 billion; direct damage (including genocide and deportations of the citizens, property looting) estimation is US$20 billion.

According to a 2019 study by economic historians, Lithuania had above average economic growth from 1937 to 1973 (when compared to other economies), but below average growth from 1973 to 1990.

=== Development since the 1990s ===
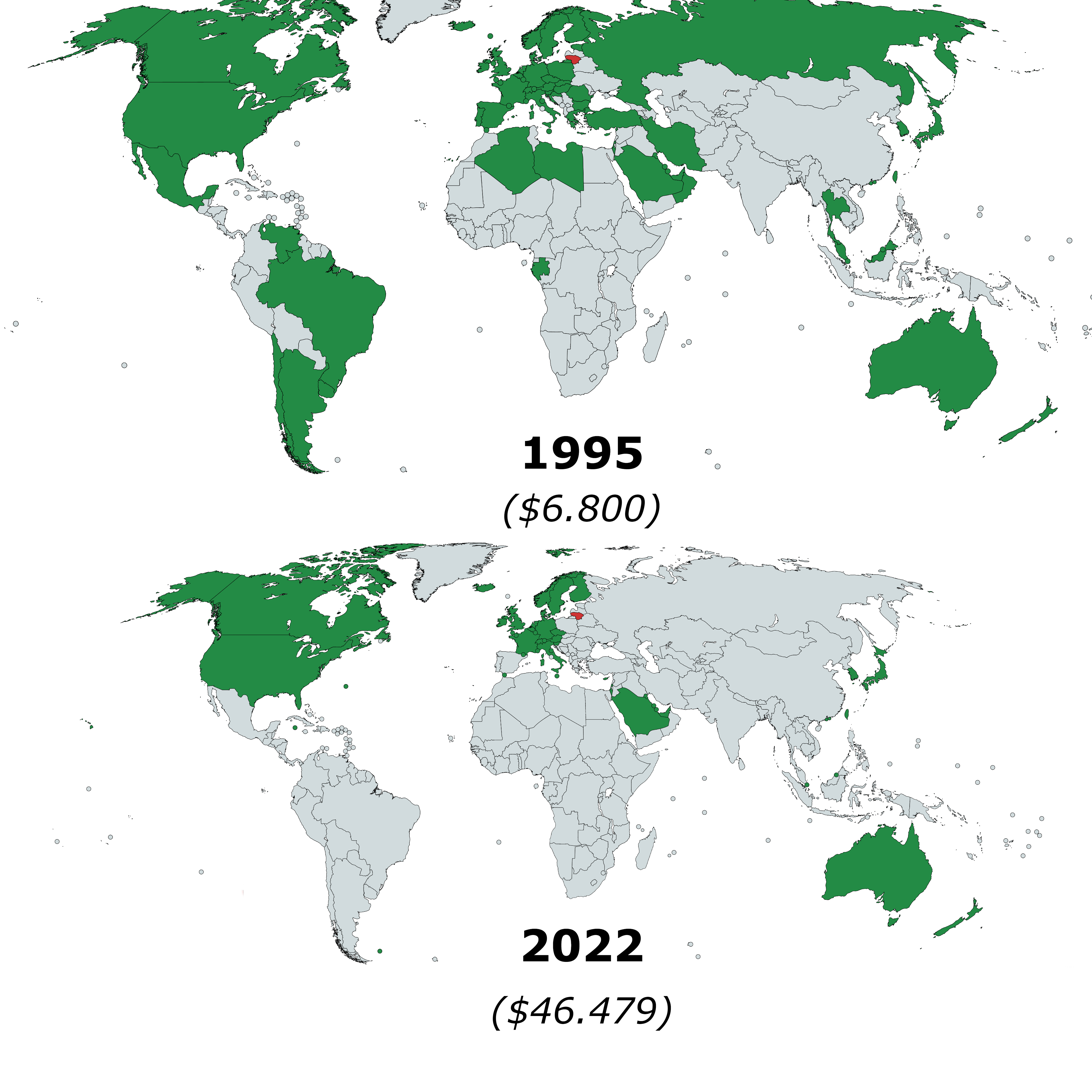
Countries with larger GDP PPP per capita than Lithuania in 1995 vs 2022

Reforms since the mid-1990s led to an open and rapidly growing economy. Open to global trade and investment, Lithuania now enjoys high degrees of business, fiscal, and financial freedom. Lithuania is a member of the EU and the WTO, so regulation is relatively transparent and efficient, with foreign and domestic capital subject to the same rules. The financial sector is advanced, regionally integrated, and subject to few intrusive regulations.

One of Lithuania's most important reforms was the privatization of state-owned assets. The first stage of privatization was being implemented between 1991 and 1995. Citizens were given investment vouchers worth €3.1 billion in nominal value, which let them participate in assets selling. By October 1995, they were used as follows: 65% for acquisition of shares; 19% for residential dwellings; 5% for agricultural properties; and 7% remained unused. More than 5,700 enterprises with €2.0 billion worth of state capital in book value were sold using four initial privatization methods: share offerings; auctions; best business plans competitions; and hard currency sales.

The second privatization step began in 1995 by approving a new law that ensured greater diversity of privatization methods and that enabled participation in the selling process without vouchers. Between 1996 and 1998, 526 entities were sold for more than €0.7 billion. Before the reforms, the public sector totally dominated the economy, whereas the share of the private sector in GDP increased to over 70% by the 2000 and 80% in 2011.

Monetary reform was undertaken in the early nineties to improve the stability of the economy. Lithuania chose a currency board system controlled by the Bank of Lithuania independent of any government institution. On 25 June 1993, the Lithuanian litas was introduced as a freely convertible currency, but on 1 April 1994 it was pegged to the United States dollar at a rate of 4 to 1. The mechanism of the currency board system enabled Lithuania to stabilize inflation rates to single digits. The stable currency rate helped to establish foreign economic relations, therefore leading to a constant growth of foreign trade.

By 1998, the economy had survived the early years of uncertainty and several setbacks, including a banking crisis. However, the collapse of the Russian ruble in August 1998 shocked the economy into negative growth and forced the reorientation of trade from Russia towards the West. In 1997, exports to the Soviet Union's successor entity (the Commonwealth of Independent States) made up 45% of total Lithuanian exports. This share of exports dropped to 21% of the total in 2006, while exports to EU members increased to 63% of the total. Exports to the United States made up 4.3% of all Lithuania's exports in 2006, and imports from the United States comprised 2% of total imports. Foreign direct investment (FDI) in 2005 was €0.8 billion.

Share of private sector in GDP

Lithuania was invited to the Helsinki EU summit in December 1999 to begin EU accession talks in early 2000. On 2 February 2002 the litas was pegged to the euro at a rate of 3.4528 to 1, which remained until Lithuania adopted the euro in 2015. Lithuania was very close to introducing the euro in 2007, but the inflation level exceeded the Maastricht requirements. On 1 January 2015, Lithuania became the 19th country to use the euro.

The Vilnius Stock Exchange, now renamed the NASDAQ OMX Vilnius, started its activity in 1993 and was the first stock exchange in the Baltic states. In 2003, the VSE was acquired by OMX. Since 27 February 2008 the Vilnius Stock Exchange has been a member of NASDAQ OMX Group, which is the world's largest exchange company across six continents, with over 3,800 listed companies. The market cap of Vilnius Stock Exchange was €3.4 billion on 27 November 2009.

During the last decade (1998–2008) the structure of Lithuania's economy has changed significantly. The biggest changes were recorded in the agricultural sector as the share of total employment decreased from 19.2% in 1998 to just 7.9% in 2008. The service sector plays an increasingly important role. The share of GDP in financial intermediation and real estate sectors was 17% in 2008 compared to 11% in 1998. The share of total employment in the financial sector in 2008 has doubled compared with 1998.

=== Lithuania in the 21st century ===
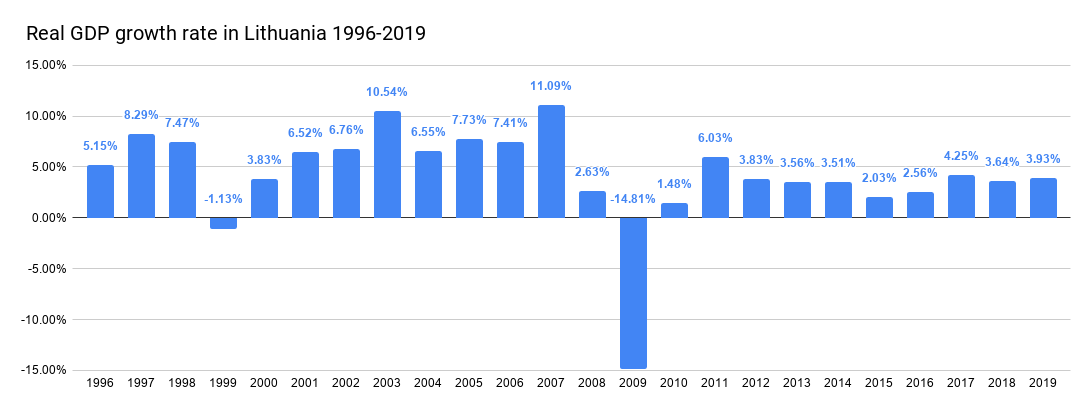
Real GDP growth in Lithuania, 1996–2019

Between 2000 and 2017, the Lithuanian GDP grew by 308%.

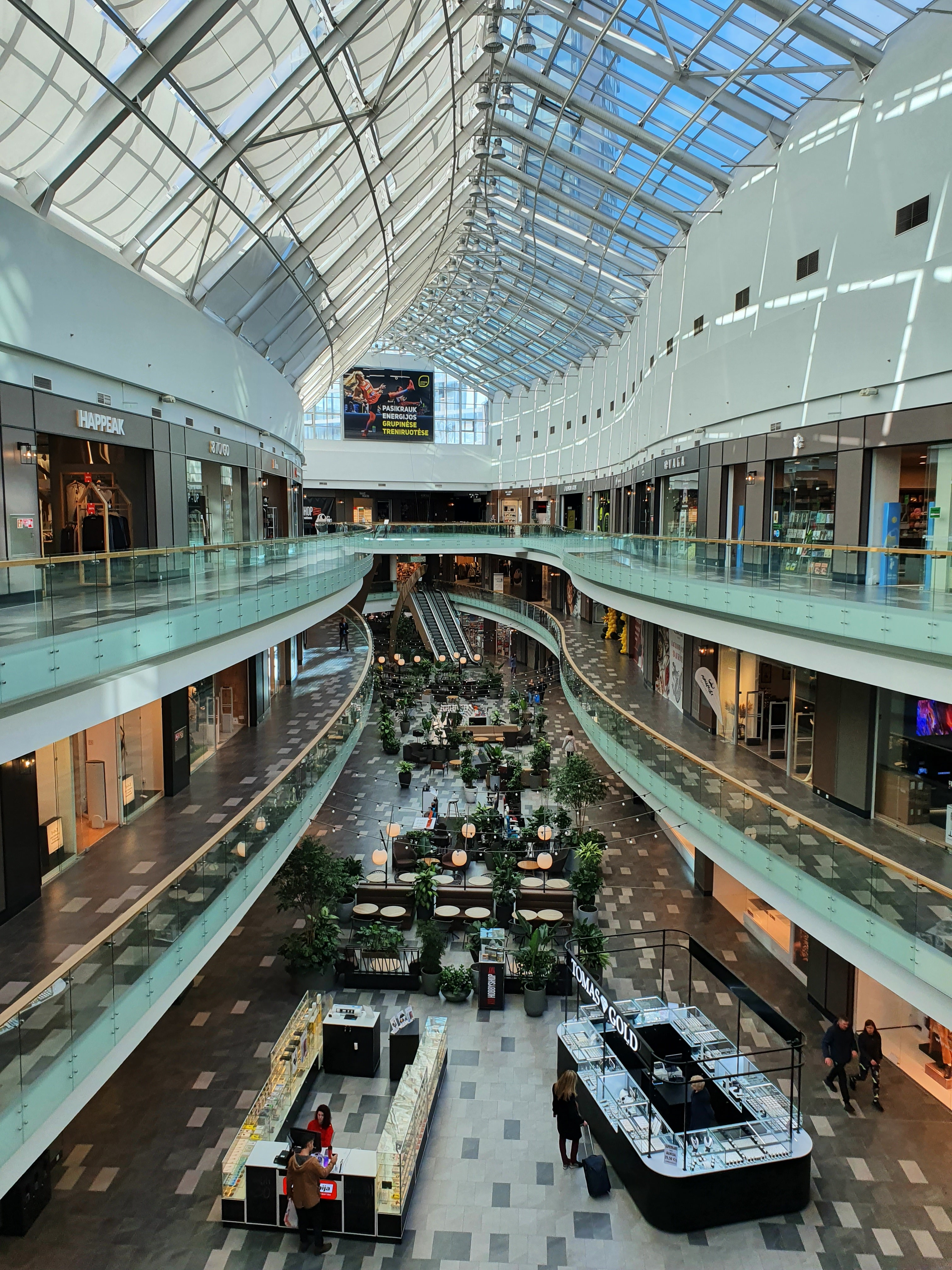
Europa Shopping Center in Vilnius featuring international brandmarks

One of the most important factors contributing to Lithuania's economic growth was its accession to the WTO in 2001 and the EU in 2004, which allows free movement of labour, capital, and trade among EU member states. On the other hand, rapid growth caused some imbalances in inflation and balance of payments. The current account deficit to GDP ratio in 2006–2008 was in the double digits and reached its peak in the first quarter of 2008 at 18.8%. This was mostly due to rapid loan portfolio growth as Scandinavian banks provided cheap credit under quite lax rules in Lithuania. The volume of loans to acquire lodgings has grown from 50 million LTL in 2004 up to 720 million LTL in 2007. Consumption was affected by credit expansion as well. This led to high inflation of goods and services, as well as trade deficit and the formation of a housing bubble.

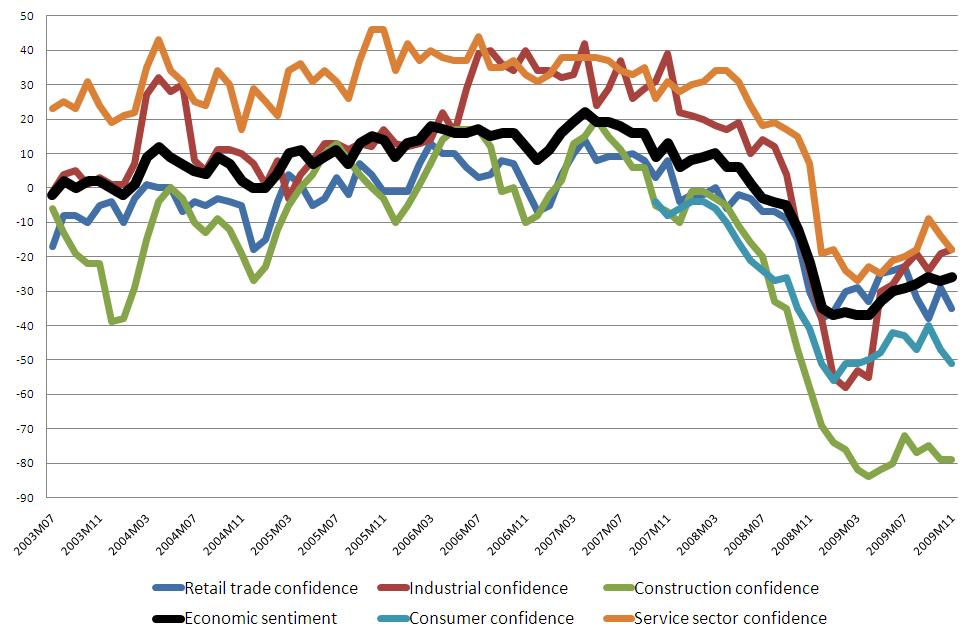
Economic sentiment indicator and its components

The global credit crunch which started in 2008 affected the real estate and retail sectors. The construction sector shrank by 46.8% during the first three-quarters of 2009 and the slump in retail trade was almost 30%. GDP plunged by 15.7% in the first nine months of 2009.

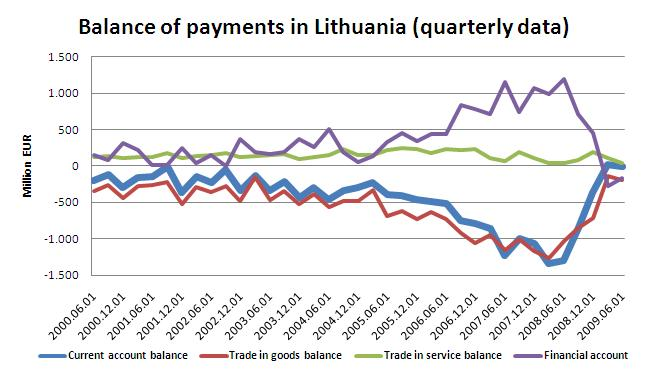
Balance of payments in Lithuania, quarterly data

Lithuania was the last among the Baltic states to be hit by recession because its GDP growth rate in 2008 was still positive, followed by a slump of more than 15% in 2009. In the third quarter of 2009, compared to the previous quarter, GDP again grew by 6.1% after five-quarters with negative numbers. Austerity policy (four-fifths of the fiscal adjustment consisted of expenditure cuts) introduced by the Kubilius government helped to balance the current account from −15.5 in 2007 to 1.6 in 2009. Economic sentiment and confidence of all business activities rebounded from a record low at the beginning of the year 2009.

Sectors related to domestic consumption and real estate still suffered from the economic crisis, but exporters started making profits even with lower levels of revenue. The catalysts of growing profit margins were lower raw material prices and staff expense.

At the end of 2017, investment of Lithuania's enterprises abroad amounted to EUR 2.9 billion. The largest investment was made in Netherlands (24.1 per cent of the total direct investment abroad), Cyprus (19.8 per cent), Latvia (14.9 per cent), Poland (10.5 per cent) and Estonia (10.3 per cent). Lithuania's direct investment in the EU member states totalled EUR 2.6 billion, or 89.3 per cent of the total direct investment abroad.

Based on the Eurostat's data, in 2017, the value of Lithuanian exports recorded the most rapid growth not only in the Baltic countries, but also across Europe, which was 16.9 per cent. Lithuania performed well in a few measures of well-being in the Better Life Index by OECD, ranking above the average in education and skills, and work-life balance. It was below the average in income and wealth, jobs and earnings, housing, health status, social connections, civic engagement, environmental quality, personal security, and subjective well-being. Lithuanian people are the happiest people in the Baltic States.

==== Euro adoption ====
Real GDP per capita development of Estonia, Latvia, and Lithuania

On 1 January 2015, Lithuania became the 19th country to adopt the euro. Joining the euro relieved the Bank of Lithuania of defending the value of the litas, and "it would give Lithuania a say in the decision-making of the European Central Bank (ECB), as well as access to the ECB single-resolution fund and cheaper borrowing costs".

== Business climate ==
Cumulative foreign direct investment (FDI) in 2017 was EUR 14.7 billion, or 35 per cent of GDP, EUR 5215 per capita. The largest FDI flow in Lithuania was into manufacturing (EUR 73.7 million), agriculture, forestry, fishery (EUR 27.4 million), information and communication (EUR 10 million). Sweden, The Netherlands and Germany have remained the largest investors.

The Lithuanian government established a plan to increase innovation by 2020. This strategy focused on attracting foreign direct investment (FDI) to specific industries, including IT services, software development, finance, and logistics. Well-known international companies such as Microsoft, IBM, Transcom, Barclays, Siemens, SEB, TeliaSonera, Paroc, Wix.com, Philip Morris, Thermo Fisher Scientific established a presence in Lithuania.

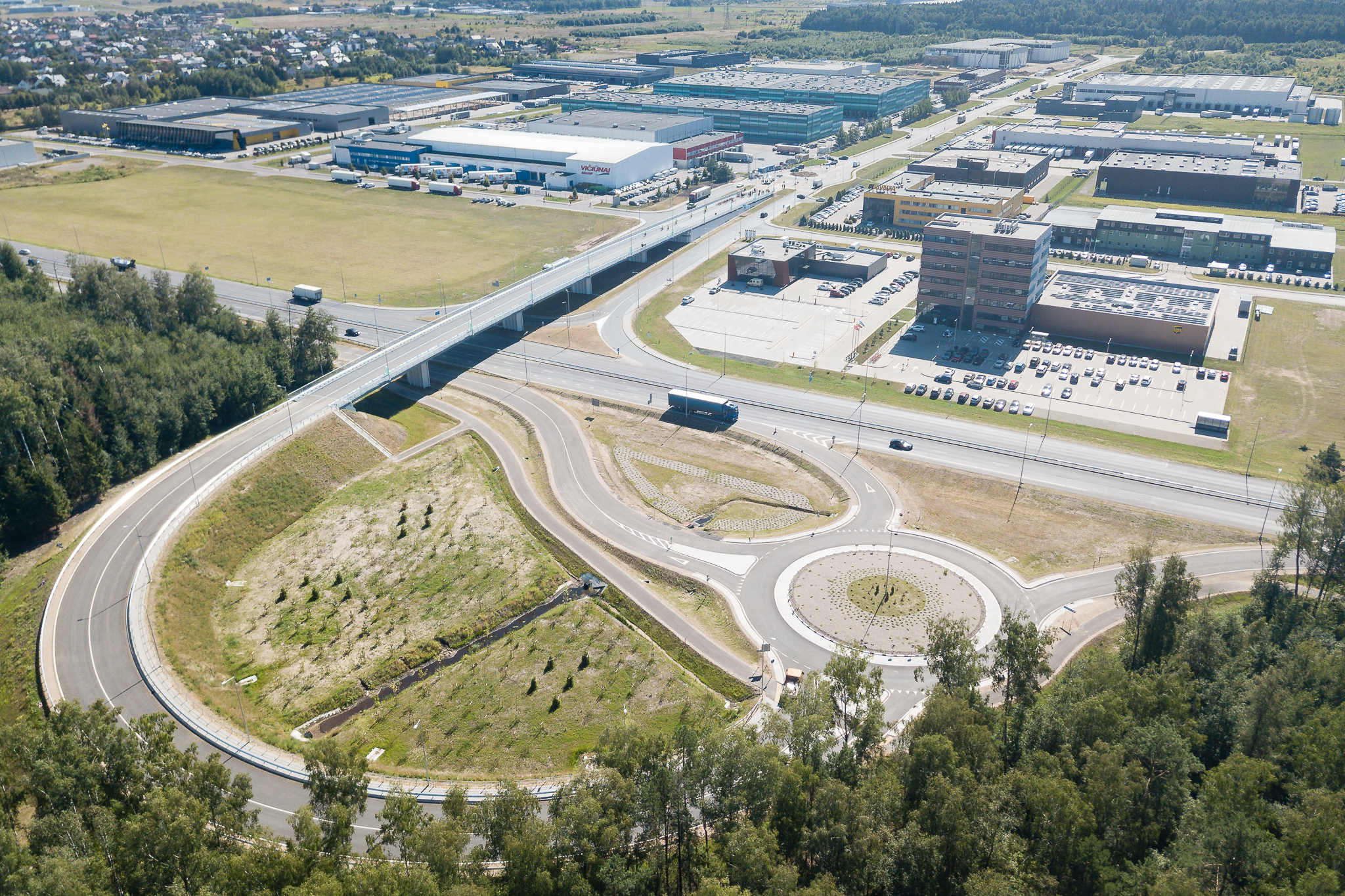
Aerial view of the Kaunas Free Economic Zone

Lithuanian FEZs (Free economic zone) offer developed infrastructure, service support, and tax incentives. A company set up in an FEZ is exempt from corporate taxation for its first six years, as well as a tax on dividends and real estate tax. 7 FEZ operate in Lithuania – Marijampolė Free Economic Zone, Kaunas Free Economic Zone, Klaipėda Free Economic Zone, Panevėžys Free Economic Zone, Akmenė Free Economic Zone, Šiauliai Free Economic Zone, Kėdainiai Free Economic Zone. There are nine industrial sites in Lithuania, which can also provide additional advantages by having a well-developed infrastructure, offering consultancy service and tax incentives. Lithuania is ranked third among developed economies by the quantity (16) of Special Economic Zones – after USA (256) and Poland (21).

Lithuanian municipalities provide special incentives to investors who create jobs or invest in infrastructure. Municipalities may tie designation criteria to additional factors, such as the number of jobs created or environmental benefits. Strategic investors' benefits could include favorable tax incentives for up to ten years. Municipalities may grant special incentives to induce investments in municipal infrastructure, manufacturing, and services.

About 40 percent of surveyed investors confirmed that they are carrying out Research and experimental development (R&D) or plan to do it in their Lithuanian branches. In 2018 Lithuania ranked as the second most attractive location for manufacturers in the Manufacturing Risk Index 2018. In 2019, Lithuania was 16th in Top 20 European FDI destination countries list, created by the Ernst & Young.

=== Regional situation ===
Lithuania is divided into ten counties. There are four cities with a population over 100,000 and two cities of over 50,000 people. The gross regional product is concentrated in the two largest counties – Vilnius and Kaunas. These two counties account for two-thirds of the GDP with just 50% of the population.

In 2023-Q3 Vilnius County was the only one with the average salary above the national average, while Utena County had the lowest with 20% below it.

In order to achieve balanced regional distribution of GDP, nine public industrial parks (Akmene Industrial Park, Alytus Industrial Park, Kedainiai Industrial Park, Marijampolė Industrial Park, Pagegiai Industrial Park, Panevėžys Industrial Park, Radviliskis Industrial Park, Ramygala Industrial Park and Šiauliai Industrial Park) and three private industrial parks (Tauragė Private Industrial Park, Sitkunai Private Industrial Park, Ramučiai Private Logistic and Industrial Park) were established to provide some tax incentives and prepared physical infrastructure.

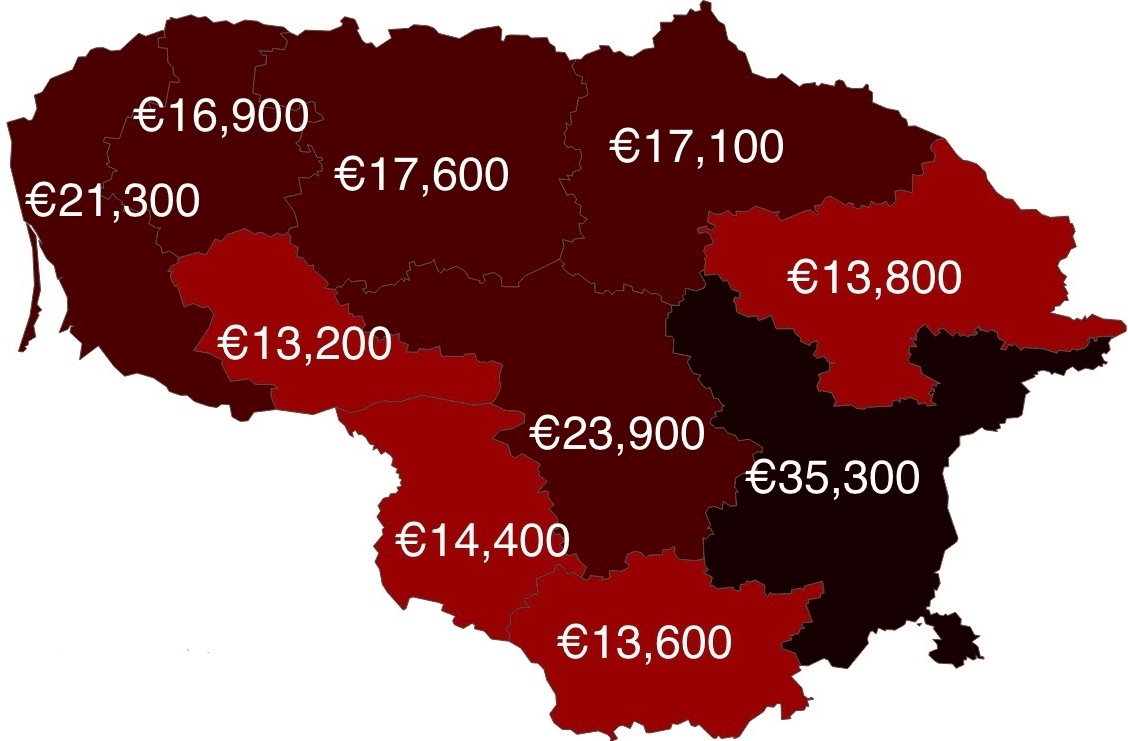
Lithuanian counties by GDP per capita, 2022

County	Area (km^{2})	Population (2026 January)	GDP (billion EUR), 2024	GDP per capita (EUR), 2024	Av. monthly wage (2026 Q1)	
County	Area (km^{2})	Population (2026 January)	GDP (billion EUR), 2024	GDP per capita (EUR), 2024	Gross (€)	Net (€)
Alytus County	5,425	130,360	2.01	15,000	2,139	1,347
Kaunas County	8,089	587,094	15.9	27,000	2,554	1,557
Klaipėda County	5,209	345,218	8.11	23,700	2,378	1,468
Marijampolė County	4,463	131,348	2.09	15,600	2,082	1,318
Panevėžys County	7,881	203,656	3.85	18,500	2,153	1,354
Šiauliai County	8,540	263,692	5.14	19,300	2,164	1,359
Tauragė County	4,411	88,803	1.44	16,000	2,195	1,375
Telšiai County	4,350	128,136	2.45	18,800	2,295	1,426
Utena County	7,201	120,394	1.87	15,000	2,127	1,341
Vilnius County	9,731	888,712	36.2	41,500	2,808	1,699
Lithuania	65,300	2,887,592	79.0	27,400	2,554	1,557

== Sectors of economy ==
In 2022, the sector with the highest number of companies registered in Lithuania is Services with 53,386 companies followed by Unknown industry and Wholesale Trade with 50,660 and 26,974 companies respectively.

Among the 1000 largest companies of 2025, these sectors were represented:

Sector(s)	Amount
Retail & Wholesale	359
Manufacturing	227
Transport & Logistics	135
Construction	80
IT & Telecommunications	40
Administrative support	30

Sector(s)	Amount
Finance & Insurance	28
Other professional services	21
Energy	18
Primary sector	16
Real estate business	11
Waste management	11

Sector(s)	Amount
Gambling	7
Healthcare	6
Catering	5
State administration	5
Charity	1
Total	1,000

=== Services ===
One of the most important sub-sectors is information and communication technologies (ICT). Around 37,000 employees work for more than 2,000 ICT companies. ICT received 9.5% of total FDI. Lithuania hosts 13 of the 20 largest IT companies in the Baltic States. Lithuania exported EUR 128 million worth ICT services in II quarter of 2018.

The shared services and business process outsourcing sectors business process outsourcing have grown significantly in Lithuania Companies that have outsourced their business operations to Lithuania include, Danske Bank, CITCO Group, Western Union, Uber, MIRROR, PricewaterhouseCoopers, Anthill, Adform, Booking Holdings (Kayak.com, Booking.com), HomeToGo, Visma, Unity, Yara International, Nasdaq Nordic, Bentley Systems, Ernst & Young and many more.

==== Financial services ====
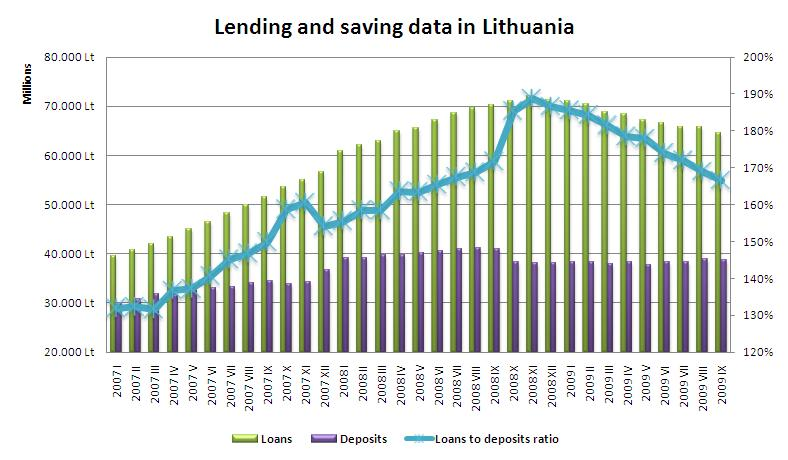
Lending and saving data

The financial sector concentrates mostly on the domestic market. There are thirteen commercial banks that hold a license from the Bank of Lithuania and eight foreign bank branches. Most of the banks belong to international corporations, mainly Scandinavian. The financial sector has demonstrated incredible growth in the pre-crisis period (1998–2008). Bank assets were only €3.2 billion or 25.5% from GDP in 2000, half of which consisted of loan portfolio.

By the beginning of the year 2009, bank assets grew to €26.0 billion or 80.8% to GDP, the loan portfolio reached €20.7 billion. The loan-to-GDP ratio was 64%. The growth of deposits was not as fast as that of loans. At the end of 2008, the loan portfolio was almost twice as big as that of deposits. It demonstrated high dependence on external financing. Contraction in the loan portfolio has been recorded over the past year, so the loans to deposits ratio are slowly getting back to healthy levels.

Moody's Corporation declared about opening its office in Vilnius.

===== Fintech =====
The country has increasingly sought to position itself as the EU's main fintech hub, hoping to attract international firms by promising to provide European operational licences within three months, compared to a waiting period of up to a year in countries like Germany or the UK. In 2017 only, 35 fintech companies came to Lithuania – a result of Lithuanian government and Bank of Lithuania simplified procedures for obtaining licences for the activities of e-money and payment institutions. Europe's first international Blockchain Centre launched in Vilnius in 2018. Since 2021, Lithuania has issued hundreds of licenses for cryptocurrency exchange and storage services, making it one of the leading countries in the EU for such permits. The government of Lithuania also aims to attract financial institutions looking for a new location after Brexit. Lithuania has granted a total of 39 e-money licenses, second in the EU only to the UK with 128 licenses. In 2018, Google set up a payment company in Lithuania, Vilnius was ranked a seventh fintech city by foreign direct investment (FDI) performance in 2019.

Bank of Lithuania, the Central Bank of Lithuania established a Regulatory sandbox to test financial innovations in a live environment under the guidance and supervision of the Bank of Lithuania. Bank of Lithuania has also developed LBChain which is the world's first blockchain-based sandbox developed by a financial market regulator, combining technological and regulatory infrastructures.

==== Tourism ====
Tourism in Lithuania is becoming increasingly important for the local economy, constituting around 5.3% of GDP in 2016. Lithuania has 22,000 rivers and rivulets, 3,000 lakes, a well-developed rural tourism network, a unique coastal area of almost 100 km and four UNESCO World Heritage Sites. Lithuania receives more than 1.4 million foreign tourists a year. Germany, Poland, Russia, Latvia, and Belarus supply the most tourists, and a significant number arrive from the UK, the USA, Finland, and Italy as well.

=== Manufacturing ===
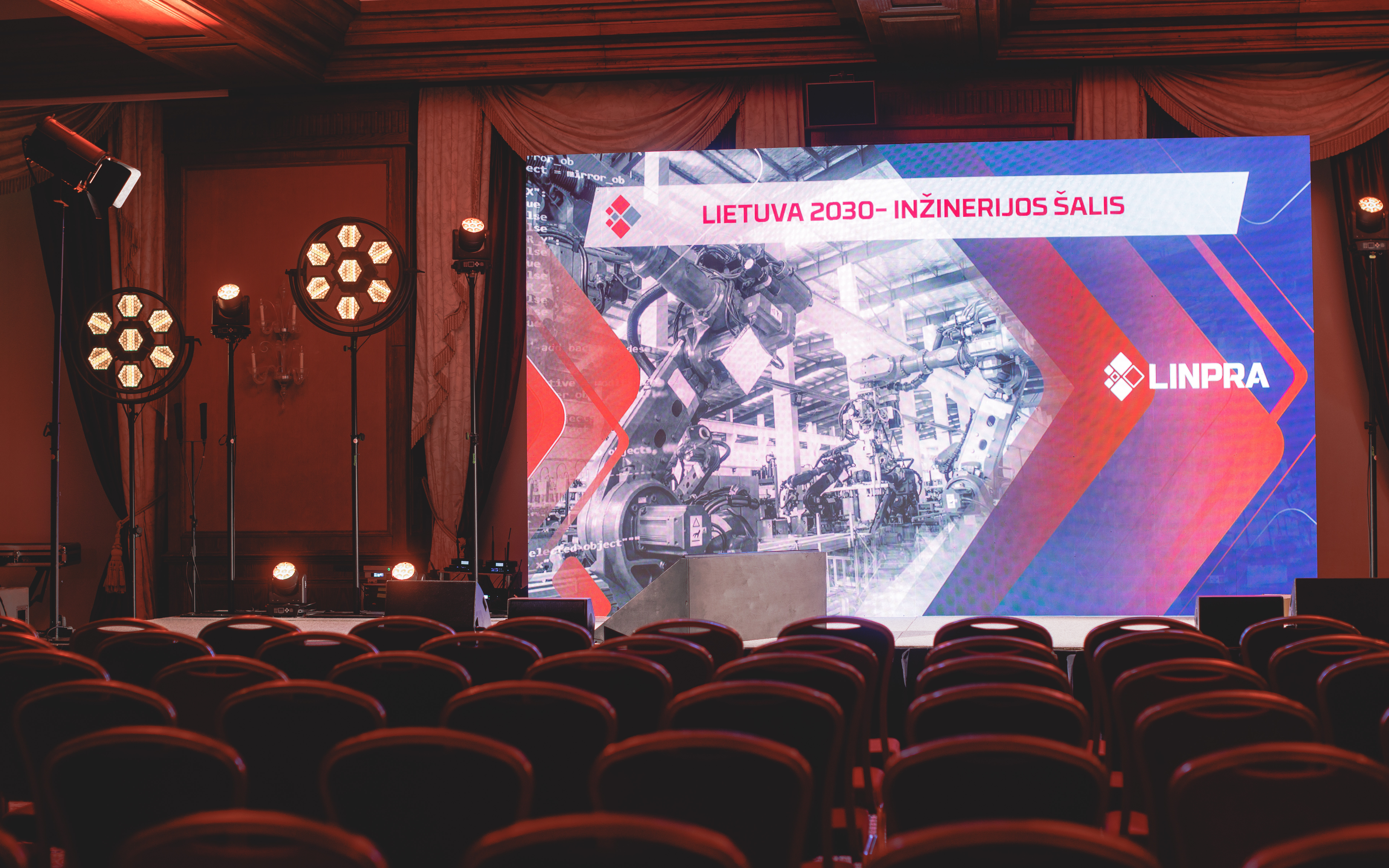
Linpra - the largest association for engineering and manufacturing companies in The Baltic States

Lithuania has a much larger manufacturing sector share in the economy's structure than the other Baltic countries. In this regard, Lithuania is closer to some Central European countries like the Czech Republic or Germany.

Manufacturing constitutes the biggest part of gross value added in Lithuania. The food processing sector constitutes 11% of total exports. Dairy products, especially cheese, are well known in neighbouring countries. Another important manufacturing activity is chemical products. The manufacturing of machinery and equipment sector in Lithuania comprises 7.1% of the country's GDP. 80% of production is exported so chemical products constitute 12.5% of total exports. Year 2019 was exemplary – more than 10 new factories were opened in Lithuania, working in the fields in engineering, high precision instruments, furniture and medical products.

Furniture

Furniture production employs more than 50,000 people and has seen double-digit growth over the last three years. The biggest companies in this field work in cooperation with IKEA, which owns one of the biggest wood processing companies in Lithuania. Lithuania is the fourth biggest supplier of furniture for IKEA after Poland, Italy and Germany.

Automotive industry

Continental AG in 2018 started to build a factory for high precision car electronics – the biggest greenfield investment project in Lithuania so far. Another German manufacturer of lighting technology Hella opened a plant in 2018 in Kaunas FEZ, which will produce sensors, actuators and control modules for the automotive industry. Lithuania's automotive cluster experienced significant growth during the past 5 years.

Companies in the automotive and engineering sector are relatively small but offer flexible services for small and non-standard orders at competitive prices. The sector employs about 3% of the working population and receives 5.6% of FDI. Vilnius Gediminas Technical University prepares experts for the sector.

Biotechnology and life sciences

Lithuania's life science sector is growing around 20–25% annually; with special focus on the production and research of biotechnology, pharmaceutical and medical devices.

Laser technology

Lithuanian laser companies were among the first ones in the world to transfer fundamental research into manufacturing. Lithuania's laser producers export laser technologies and devices to nearly 100 countries. Half of all picosecond lasers sold worldwide are produced by Lithuanian companies, while Lithuanian-made femtosecond parametric light amplifiers, used in generating the ultrashort laser pulses, account for as much as 80% of the world market.

=== Agriculture ===
Despite a decreased share in GDP, the agricultural sector is still important for Lithuania as it employs almost 8% of the work force and supplies materials for the food processing sector. In 2023 it, together with food products, combined for 19.6% of all Lithuanian exports. 44.8% of the land is arable and the total agricultural area was 2.9 million hectares, of which 2.3 million ha were arable, in 2023. Three connecting municipalities - Panevėžys district, Kupiškis and Raseiniai have the largest areas in the country. Cereals, wheat, and triticale are the most popular production of farms. The number of livestock and poultry has decreased twofold compared to the 1990s. The number of cattle in Lithuania at the beginning of the year 2009 was 770,000, the number of dairy cows was 395,000, and the number of poultry was 9.1 million.

Lithuanian food consumption has evolved; between 1992 and 2008, consumption of vegetables increased by 30% to 86 kg per capita, and consumption of meat and its products increased by 23% during the same period to 81 kg per capita. On the other hand, consumption of milk and dairy products has decreased to 268 kg per capita by 21%, and the consumption of bread and grain products decreased to 114 kg per capita by 19% as well.

Lithuania produced in 2018:

- 2.8 million tons of wheat;
- 888 thousand tons of sugar beet (the beet is used to manufacture sugar and ethanol);
- 619 thousand tons of barley;
- 433 thousand tons of rapeseed;
- 296 thousand tons of potato;
- 213 thousand tons of pea;
- 182 thousand tons of oat;
- 153 thousand tons of triticale;
- 149 thousand tons of bean;

In addition to smaller productions of other agricultural products, like apple (92 thousand tons), maize (87 thousand tons) and rye (44 thousand tons).

=== Natural resources ===
The total value of natural resources in Lithuania is around €17 billion, or around one third of Lithuania's GDP. The most valuable natural resource in the country is subterranean water, which constitutes more than half of the total value of natural resources.

In 1990 Lithuania started petroleum production from onshore oil wells as a response to the Soviet economic blockade. Since 2001 the yearly production declined as Lithuanian government no longer supports development of new oil wells and banned any development of offshore oil rigs.

Mining of other mineral natural resources that is ongoing in Lithuania:

Amounts extracted in thousand m³
Mineral	2025	2024	2023	2022	2021	2020	2019
Gravel	10,153	12,598	9,565	8,936	9,287	8,616	8,901
Sand	3,852	3,859	4,078	3,245	3,261	2,930	2,487
Dolomites	3,016	3,771	2,939	2,704	2,814	2,880	2,124
Peat	2,628	2,881	2,932	3,081	2,988	3,076	3,316
Limestone	748	883	796	998	920	781	781
Clay	145	159	184	285	287	233	241
Opoka	33	51	5	—			
Sapropel	3	2	1	1	2	1	2

== Corporations ==
Lithuania traditionally has strong agricultural, furniture, logistics, meatpacking & poultry, biotechnology and laser industries. Maxima is a retail chain operating in Lithuania, Latvia, Estonia, Poland and Bulgaria and it is the largest Lithuanian capital company and the largest employer in the Baltic states. Girteka Logistics is Europe's largest transport company. Biotechpharma is a biopharmaceutical research and development company with a focus on recombinant protein technology development. The BIOK Laboratory is a startup founded by biochemistry scientists which is the biggest producer of Lithuanian natural cosmetic products. UAB SANITEX is the largest wholesale, distribution and logistics company in Lithuania and Latvia, also active in Estonia and Poland. SoliTek – the largest photovoltaic module and energy storage battery manufacturer in Northern Europe. One of the leaders of cellular IoT gateways producers in Europe – UAB Teltonika.

In the "Baltic Top 50", the biggest Baltic states companies rating created by Coface, more than half – 27 – companies are from Lithuania. Together they account for 69.1% combined turnover, 67.1% net profit, and 76.2% employees of all the listed companies.

=== Largest companies ===
The total revenue of the 1000 largest companies in Lithuania reached 77.9 billion euros in 2023, and saw a 2.6% year-to-year contraction. There were the largest companies of Lithuania in 2025 financial year, by revenue:

Rank (Note: In the VŽ list)	Name	Headquarters	Revenue (bil. €)	Employees	Industry
1.	Orlen Lietuva, AB	Mažeikiai	5.373 ▼	1,535	Oil, petrol
2.	Maxima LT, UAB	Vilnius	2.329 ▲	11,125	Retail
NR	Revolut Bank, UAB	Vilnius	2.165 ▲	140	Banking
3. ▲	Iki Lietuva, UAB	Vilnius	1.005 ▲	5,785	Retail
4. ▲	Vinted, UAB	Vilnius	0.999 ▲	1,705	Recommerce
NR	Lidl Lietuva, UAB	Vilnius	0.956 ▲	3,037	Retail
5. ▲	Norfos mažmena, UAB	Vilnius	0.954 ▲	3,526	Retail
6. ▲	Sanitex, UAB	Kaunas	0.935 ▲	1,218	Wholesale, logistics
7. ▼	Viada LT, UAB	Vilnius	0.901 ▼	1,209	Petrol stations
8. ▼	Ignitis, UAB	Vilnius	0.901 ▼	413	Electric power industry
9. ▲	Rivona, UAB	Vilnius	0.821 ▲	1,340	Commercial real estate, manufacturing, logistics
10. ▲	Kesko Senukai Lithuania, UAB	Kaunas	0.777 ▲	2,916	Home improvement retail
11.	Girteka Logistics, UAB	Vilnius	0.746 ▲	571	Logistics
12. ▲	Linas Agro, AB	Panevėžys	0.709 ▼	209	Agribusiness
13.	Energijos skirstymo operatorius, AB	Vilnius	0.707 ▲	2,595	Electric power distribution
NR	Swedbank, AB	Vilnius	0.657 ▼	1,695	Banking
14.	Lifosa, AB	Kėdainiai	0.606 ▲	946	Fertilizer
15.	SBA Home, UAB	Klaipėda	0.587 ▲	105	Wholesale

- Please note that the figures are of individual companies, most of which operate within corporate group structures. Group-level consolidated numbers are not presented in the data. For comparison, Vilniaus prekyba had revenue of €8.5 billion and indirectly employed over 44 thousand laborers in 2025. Ignitis Group had revenue of over €2.5 billion in 2023, etc.

=== Most valuable companies ===
Largest Lithuanian companies by valuation (EUR € billions) according to 15min (2024).

Rank	Name	Headquarters	Valuation (bil. €)	Industry
1 ▲	Maxima Group, UAB	Vilnius	2.865 ▲	Retail
2 ▼	Thermo Fisher Scientific Baltics, UAB	Vilnius	2.404 ▼	Life sciences
3 ▲	Avia Solutions Group, PLC	Vilnius	2.394 ▲	Aviation
4 ▲	Orlen Lietuva, AB	Mažeikiai	2.196 ▲	Oil, petrol
5	Luminor Bank, AS Lietuvos skyrius	Vilnius	1.583 ▲	Banking
6 ▲	Swedbank, AB	Vilnius	1.441 ▲	Banking
7 ▼	Ignitis grupė, AB	Vilnius	1.354 ▼	Electric power
8 ▲	Baltic Classifieds Group, PLC	Vilnius	1.284 ▲	Web portal
9 ▲	SEB bankas, AB	Vilnius	1.217 ▲	Banking
10 ▼	Girteka Group, UAB	Vilnius	1.097 ▼	Logistics
11 ▲	Telia Lietuva, AB	Vilnius	0.926 ▼	Telecommunications
12 ▲	Tele2, UAB	Vilnius	0.809 ▲	Telecommunications
13 ▼	Lithuanian Railways, AB	Vilnius	0.706 ▼	Rail transport
14 ▼	Bitė Lietuva, UAB	Vilnius	0.672 ▼	Telecommunications

== Workforce ==
Population with higher education, 2001–2008

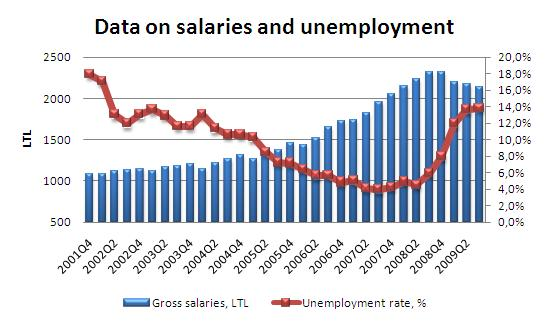
Salaries and unemployment, 2001–2009

The number of the population aged 15 years and over is 1.57 million, activity rate was 63 percent in 2025. In 2025, the most popular professions in Lithuania were truck drivers (6.4% of all workforce), salespeople (3.6%) and sales professionals (3.3%), chief executive officers (2.9%), cleaners (2.8%), accountants (2.1%).

During the period of 1995–2017 average salary grew more than four times in Lithuania. Despite this, labour costs in Lithuania are among the lowest in the EU. Average monthly net salary in IV quarter 2018 was EUR 800 and increased by 9.5 percent. Unemployment in Lithuania has been volatile. Since the year 2001, the unemployment rate has decreased from almost 20% to less than 4% in 2007 thanks to two main reasons. Firstly, during the time of rapid economic expansion, numerous work places were established. This caused a decrease in the unemployment rate and a rise in staff expenses. Secondly, emigration has also reduced unemployment problems since accession to the EU. However, the economic crisis of year 2008 has lowered the need for workers, so the unemployment rate increased to 13.8% and then stabilized in the third quarter of 2009. Unemployment rate in I quarter of 2018 was 6.3 percent.

Lithuania is among the top 5 countries in the world by postsecondary (tertiary) education attainment.As of 2016, 54.9% of the population aged 25 to 34, and 30.7% of the population aged 55 to 64 had completed tertiary education. The share of tertiary-educated 25–64-year-olds in STEM (Science, technology, engineering, and mathematics) fields in Lithuania were above the OECD average (29% and 26% respectively), similarly to business, administration and law (25% and 23% respectively).

The level of labour productivity in Lithuania today is about one-third below the OECD average. Lithuania is ranked 15th in Employment Flexibility Index.

=== Largest employers ===
==== Nationally ====
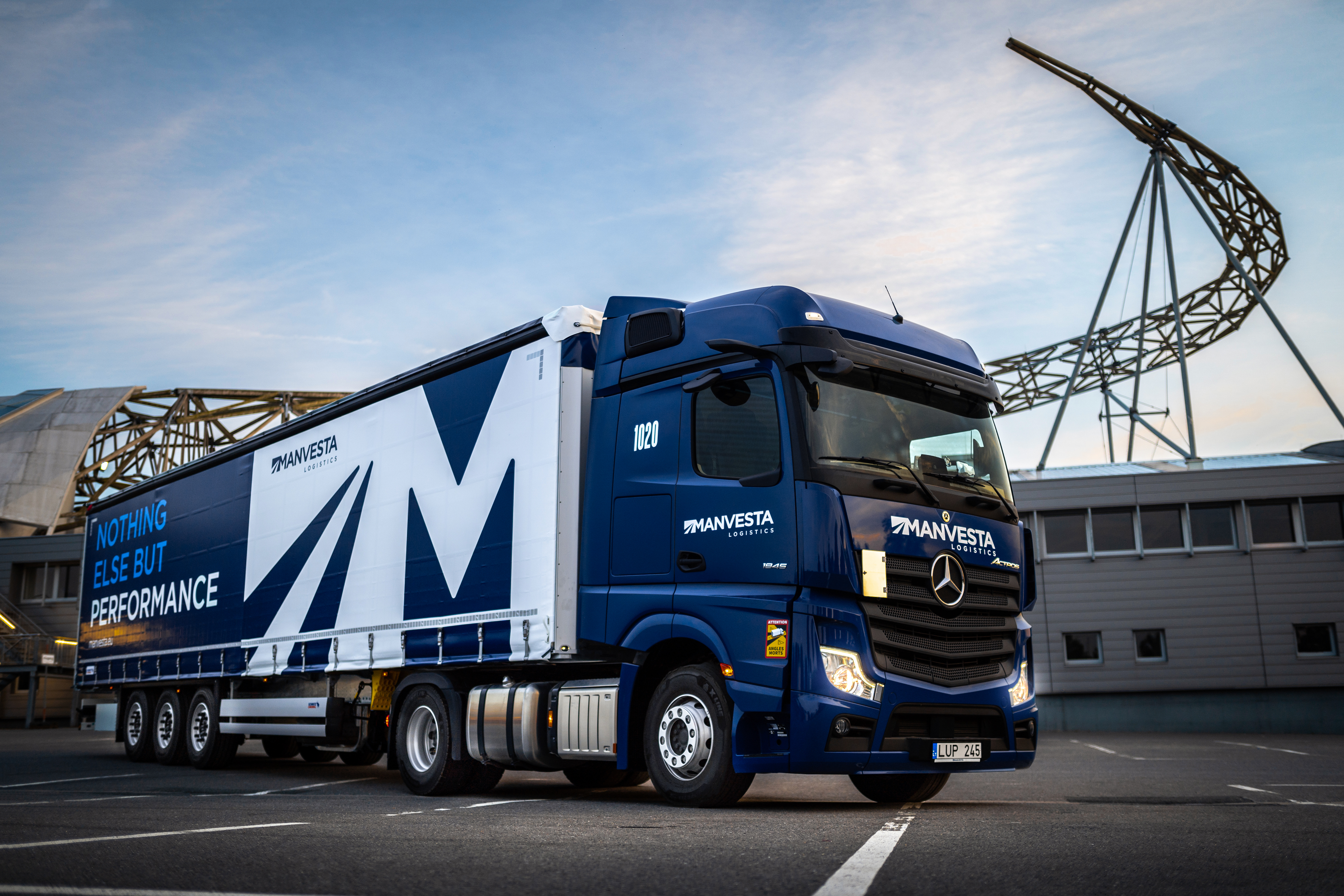
Truck of Manvesta

Employment agencies are excluded from the list.

Company	No. Employees Aug 2026	Type			Industry
Company	No. Employees Aug 2026	Pv	Form	Pb	Industry
Maxima LT	11,111	●	UAB		Retail
LSMU Hospital Kaunas Clinics	7,667		VĮ	○	Hospital
Vilnius University Hospital Santaros Clinics	6,884		VĮ	○	Hospital
IKI Lietuva	5,824	●	UAB		Retail
Vilnius University	5,630		VĮ	○	University
Danske Bank Lithuania	4,387	●	Branch		Banking
Fire and Rescue Department	3,883		BĮ	○	Firefighting
Lithuanian State Border Guard Service	3,687		BĮ	○	Border patrol
Norfos Mažmena	3,553	●	UAB		Retail
InMedica	3,440	●	UAB		Clinics
Klaipėda University Hospital	3,168		VĮ	○	Hospital
Lidl Lietuva	3,050	●	UAB		Retail
LSMU Kaunas Hospital	3,036		VĮ	○	Hospital
Rimi Lietuva	2,998	●	UAB		Retail
Kesko Senukai Lietuva	2,898	●	UAB		Retail
Energijos skirstymo operatorius	2,618		AB	◐	Electric power distribution
Lithuanian University of Health Sciences	2,610		VĮ	○	University
Manvesta	2,605	●	UAB		Trucking industry
Valstybinių miškų urėdija	2,597		VĮ	○	Forestry
Ambulance service	2,592		VĮ	○	Emergency medical services
LTG Infra	2,512		AB	○	Railway infrastructure manager
Lietuvos paštas	2,439		AB	○	Mail
Intersurgical	2,295	●	UAB		Health technology
Republican Šiauliai Hospital	2,212		VĮ	○	Hospital
Vilniaus viešasis transportas	2,204		UAB	○	Public transport operator

==== Largest private employers by municipality ====
The following companies provided the most jobs (at least 1000 laborers) within the specific municipalities in 2024. Employment agencies are excluded from the list.

Municipality	Company	Industry	No. Employees	Perc. of workforce
Vilnius	Maxima LT	Retail	4,576	40%
Švenčionys	Intersurgical	Health technology	2,191	100%
Panevėžys	PKC Group Lithuania	Automotive electronics	2,094	
Klaipėda (district)	Vlantana	Trucking industry	1,909	79%
Kaunas (district)	Hoptransa	Trucking industry	1,670	94%
Kaunas	Maxima LT	Retail	1,634	14%
Marijampolė	Mantinga	Bakery	1,603	100%
Visaginas	Ignalina Nuclear Power Plant	Radioactive waste management	1,599	100%
Mažeikiai	Orlen Lietuva	Oil, petrol	1,467	100%
Vilnius (district)	Vilniaus paukštynas	Poultry farming	1,296	100%
Šiauliai	Trasis	Trucking industry	1,239	78%
Telšiai	Žemaitijos pienas	Dairy products	1,239	100%
Utena	Biovela-Utenos mėsa	Meat-packing	1,196	100%
Jonava	Achema	Fertilizers	1,157	100%
Kėdainiai	Krekenavos agrofirma	Meat-packing	1,084	100%

== Income and wealth distribution ==
Lithuania belongs to high income group according to Credit Suisse Global Wealth Report 2019. As of 2019, Lithuanian average wealth per adult was $50,254 (an increase of 82% from $27,507 in the year 2017) Household debt is among the lowest among EU countries – 49 percent of net disposable income in 2015.

=== Municipalities by median home value ===
Lithuanian municipalities by median home value (government estimate), 2025

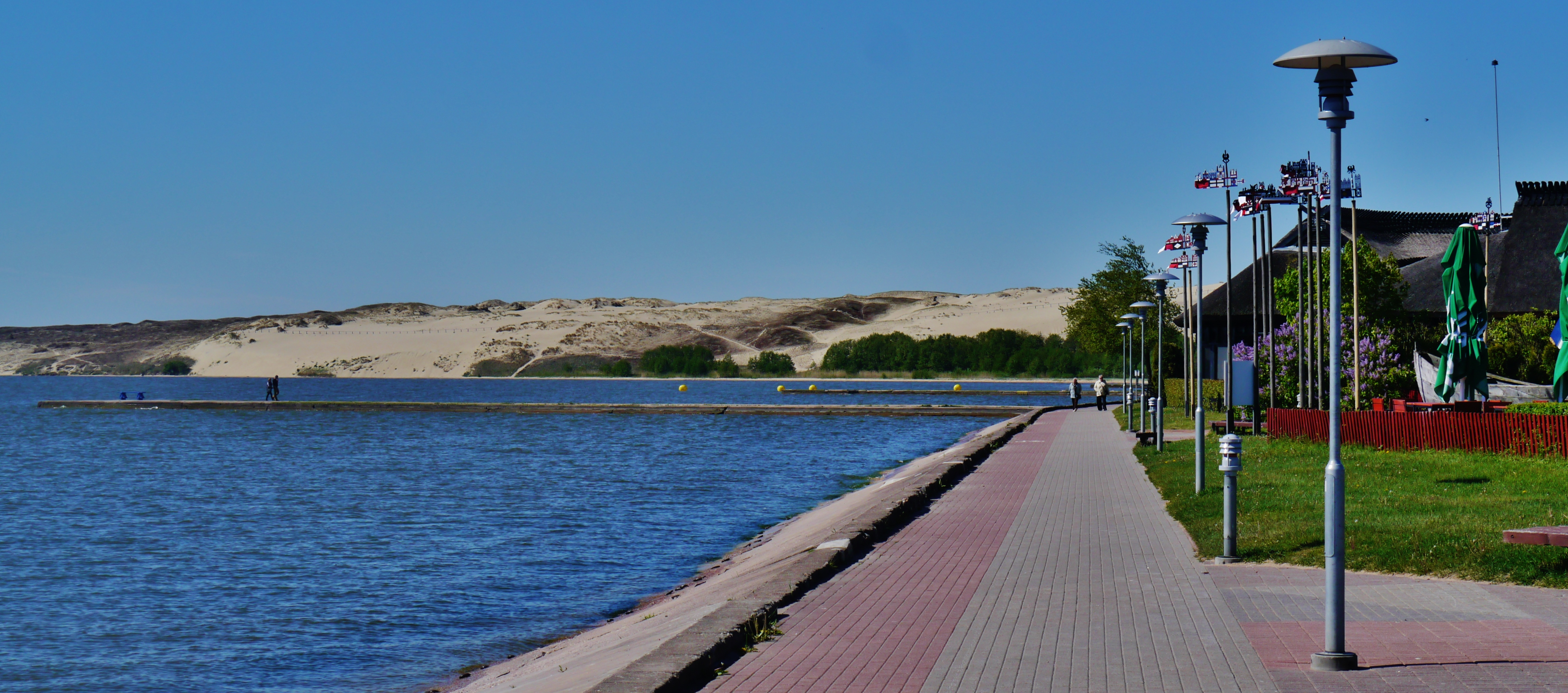
Neringa Municipality has the highest home prices in Lithuania surpassing capital city by almost two times.

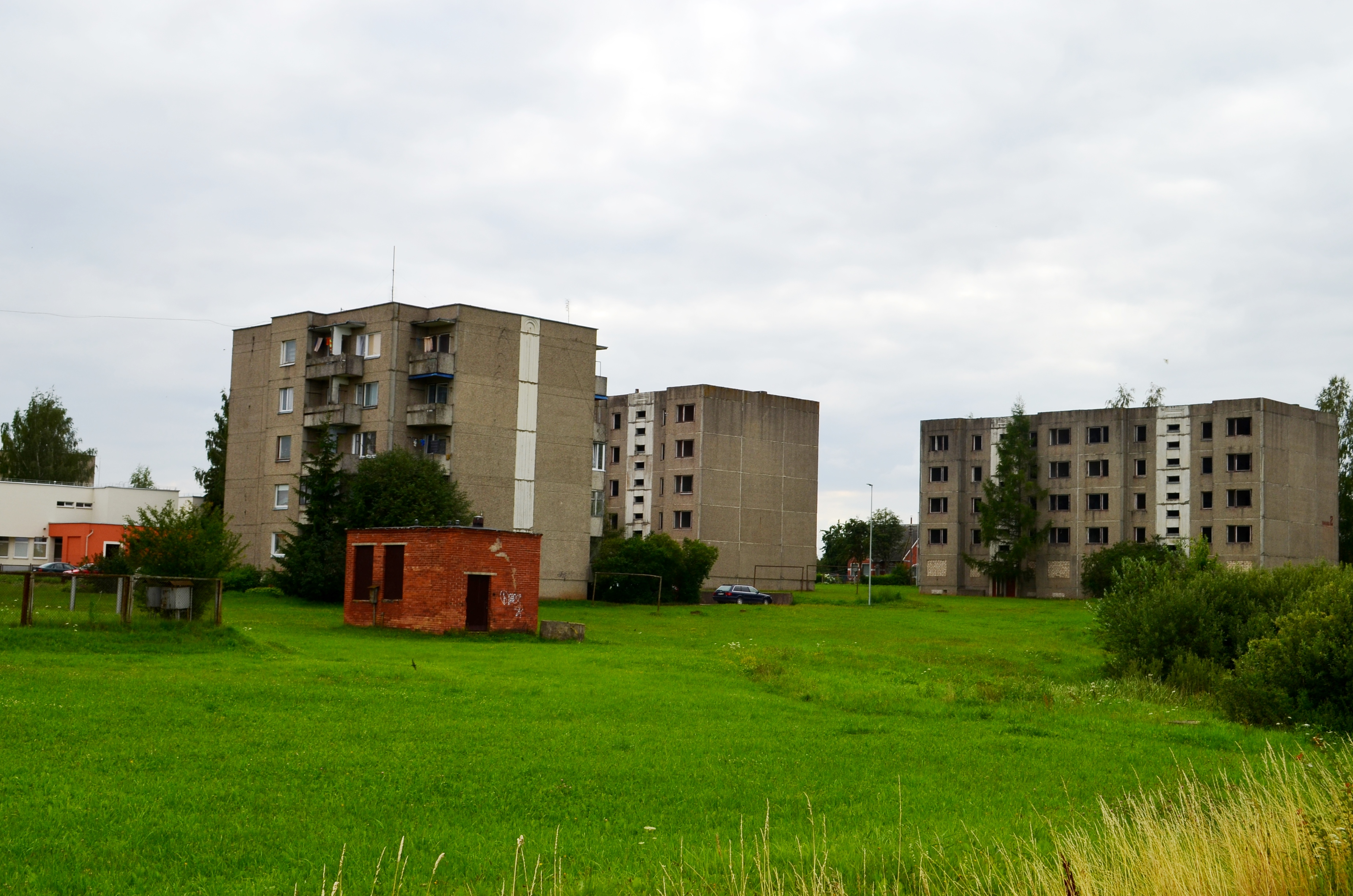
Didžiasalis, Ignalina District. In 1989 it had a population of 2,600, which dropped to around 1,000 by 2021.

Median home value (2022 and 2025 government estimates)

Municipality	Euro (€)	
Municipality	2022	2025
Neringa	145,000	200,000
Vilnius	76,300	109,000
Palanga	55,500	98,700
Kaunas (district)	48,600	89,900
Klaipėda (district)	48,800	87,800
Kaunas	44,900	75,200
Vilnius (district)	42,700	74,500
Klaipėda	52,400	65,000
Birštonas	36,400	62,500
Druskininkai	37,700	54,700
Šiauliai	42,500	54,200
Panevėžys	33,400	50,100
Trakai	30,300	45,600
Alytus	24,700	44,500
Elektrėnai	26,900	43,300
Kretinga	27,700	43,200
Marijampolė	25,600	41,900
Jonava	20,400	37,300
Utena	23,300	35,300
Tauragė	26,100	34,100
Mažeikiai	19,900	31,700
Plungė	18,200	28,200
Telšiai	17,000	27,600
Ukmergė	13,800	23,500
Šiauliai (district)	14,600	23,200
Širvintos	14,300	23,000
Šilutė	14,300	22,300
Kėdainiai	12,600	19,350
Kaišiadorys	11,400	19,100
Visaginas	11,000	18,800

Municipality	Euro (€)	
Municipality	2022	2025
Kazlų Rūda	11,100	17,800
Raseiniai	14,200	17,500
Jurbarkas	13,400	15,300
Vilkaviškis	11,500	14,300
Švenčionys	8,910	14,100
Panevėžys (district)	8,340	14,000
Rietavas	8,540	13,900
Šakiai	10,500	13,400
Akmenė	7,850	13,400
Molėtai	7,500	12,900
Prienai	8,030	12,700
Šalčininkai	7,990	12,200
Radviliškis	8,100	11,600
Šilalė	8,790	11,500
Varėna	6,050	11,300
Skuodas	8,390	11,000
Alytus (district)	7,530	11,000
Kalvarija	▼8,480	10,700
Joniškis	8,140	10,500
Anykščiai	5,750	9,730
Biržai	6,530	9,100
Lazdijai	6,980	8,610
Pagėgiai	6,100	8,085
Pasvalys	5,020	7,970
Pakruojis	6,030	7,960
Kupiškis	5,280	7,860
Kelmė	5,970	7,820
Rokiškis	▼5,230	7,790
Zarasai	4,900	7,590
Ignalina	4,080	6,050

== Infrastructure ==
The transport, storage, and communication sector has increased its importance to the economy of Lithuania. In 2008, it accounted for 12.1% of GDP compared to 9.1% in 1996.

=== Communications ===
Lithuania has a broadly developed radio, television, landline and mobile phone, as well as broadband internet networks.

Lithuanian National Radio and Television, the public broadcaster in Lithuania operates 3 television channels, including a satellite channel, as well as 3 radio stations. Privately owned commercial TV and Radio broadcasters operate a multitude national, regional and local channels.

There are four TIER III datacenters in Lithuania. Lithuania is 44th globally ranked country on data center density according to Cloudscene.

The fixed landline network connects 625 thousand households and businesses (down from the record 845 thousand in 2005). The decline in subscription and utilization of the landline network has been driven by increased availability of mobile phone services. The mobile telephony penetration rate in Lithuania (of 151 per 100 population in 2013) has been one of the highest in the world. In 2013, there were 13 providers of mobile phone services, with the three largest ones – BITĖ Lietuva, Omnitel, and Tele2 – operating their own cellular networks.

Lithuanian retail internet sector is competitive, with more than 100 service providers. Retail internet connectivity in Lithuania was among the cheapest in Europe; however, the internet penetration rate (64% of households using internet in 2013) was lower than in other EU countries in the region – Estonia (79%), Latvia (70%) and Poland (69%). Lithuanian internet connection speeds have been claimed to be among the fastest in the world based on user-initiated tests at Speedtest.net.

=== Energy ===
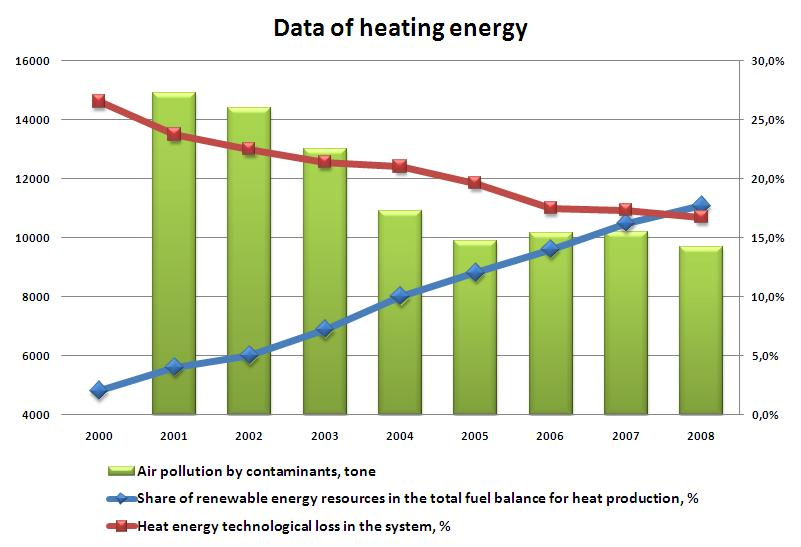
Heating energy data

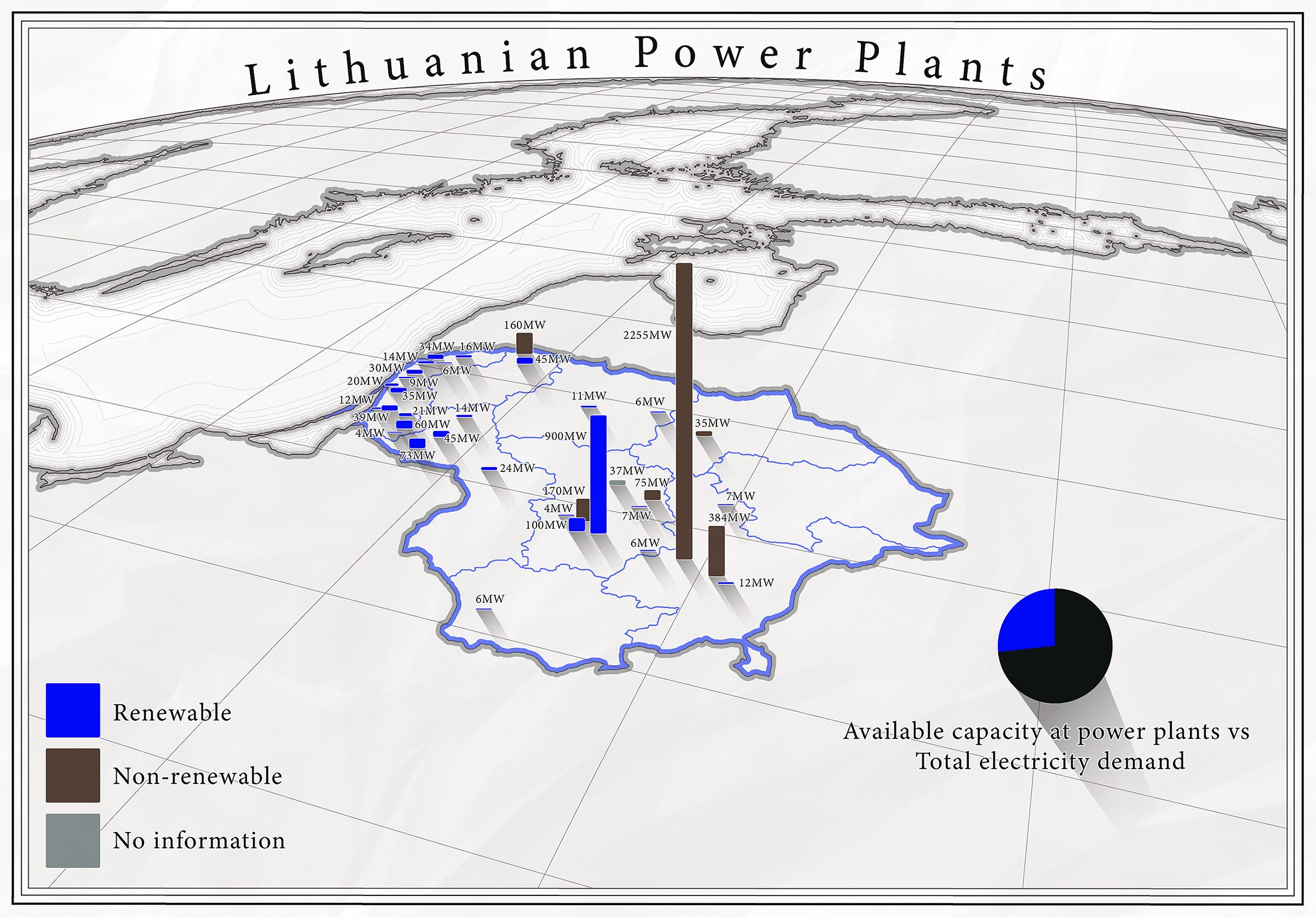
Lithuanian Power Plants in 2019

The utilities sector accounts for more than 3% of gross value added in Lithuania. Electricity production exceeded 12 billion kWh in 2007, and consumption exceeded 9.6 billion kWh. Surplus electricity is exported.

Lithuania operated a nuclear power plant in Visaginas, which produced 72% of electricity in Lithuania. The plant was shut down on 31 December 2009 in line with the commitments made when Lithuania joined EU in 2004. A new nuclear power plant in Visaginas has been proposed but the status of the project is uncertain after it was rejected by the voters in a referendum in 2012.

The supply of heating energy was modernized during the decade (1998–2008). Technological loss in the heat energy system has decreased significantly from 26.2% in the year 2000 to 16.7% in 2008. The amount of air pollution was reduced by one-third. The share of renewable energy resources in the total fuel balance for heat production increased to almost 20%.

In order to break down Gazprom's monopoly in the natural gas market of Lithuania, the first large scale LNG import terminal (Klaipėda LNG FSRU) in the Baltic region was built in the port of Klaipėda in 2014. The Klaipėda LNG terminal was called Independence, thus emphasising the aim to diversify the energy market of Lithuania. Norvegian company Equinor supplies 540 million cubic metres (19 billion cubic feet) of natural gas annually from 2015 until 2020. The terminal is able to cover 100% of Lithuania's demand and 90% of Latvia's and Estonia's national demand in the future.

Kruonis Pumped Storage Plant operates as pumped-storage providing a spinning reserve of the power system, in order to regulate the load curve of the power system 24 hours a day. In 2015 Kruonis Industrial Park was established as a place for data centers.

In 2018 synchronising the Baltic States' electricity grid with the Synchronous grid of Continental Europe has started.

=== Transport ===
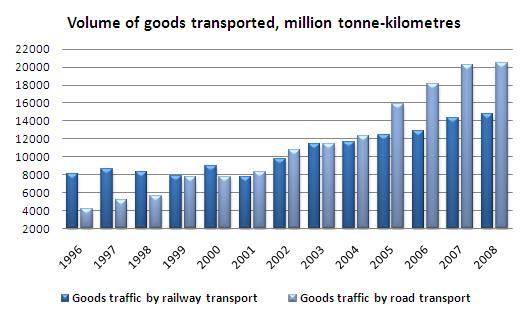
Volume of goods transported, million tonne-kilometers

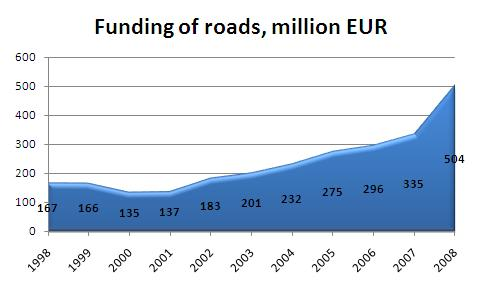
Funding of roads

Lithuania forms part of the transport corridor between the East and the West. The volume of goods transported by road transport has increased fivefold since 1996. The total length of roadways is more than 80,000 km, and 90% of them are paved. The government spending on road infrastructure exceeded €0.5 billion in 2008. Via Baltica highway passes through Kaunas, while membership in the Schengen Agreement allows for smooth border crossing to Poland and Latvia.

Rail transport in Lithuania provides long-distance passenger and cargo services. Railways carry approximately 50 million tons of cargo and 7 million passengers a year. Direct rail routes link Lithuania with Russia, Belarus, Latvia, Poland, and Germany. Also, the main transit route between Russia and Russia's Kaliningrad Region passes through Lithuania. Lithuanian Railways AB transports about 44% of the freight carried through Lithuania. This is a very high indicator compared to other EU countries, where freight transportation by rail amounts to only 10% of the total.

An ice-free seaport of Klaipeda is located in the western part of Lithuania. The port is an important regional transport hub connecting the sea, land and railway routes from east and west. It handles roughly 7,000 ships and 30 million tons of cargo every year, and accepts large-tonnage vessels (dry-cargo vessels up to 70,000 DWT, tankers up to 100,000 DWT and cruise ships up to 270 meters long). The seaport of Klaipėda is able to receive Panamax-type vessels. One of the fastest growing segments of sea transport is passenger traffic, which has increased fourfold since 2002. The inland river cargo port in Marvelė, linking Kaunas and Klaipėda, received first cargo in 2019.

Lithuania has four international airports – Vilnius Airport (VNO), Kaunas Airport (KUN), Šiauliai Airport (SQQ) and Palanga Airport (PLQ). More than 30 domestic airports being used by aeroclubs and amateur pilots.

=== Storage ===
There are more than 600,000 m^{2} of modern logistics and warehousing facilities in Lithuania. The biggest supply of new, modern warehousing facilities is in the capital city Vilnius (after the completion of several new projects in the third quarter of 2009, the supply of modern warehousing premises has increased by nearly 12% in Vilnius and currently reaches 334,400 m^{2} of the rentable area). Kaunas is in the second place (around 200,000 m^{2}), and Klaipėda in the third (122,500 m^{2}). Since the beginning of the year 2009, prices for warehousing premises have dropped by 20–25% in Vilnius, Kaunas, and Klaipėda, and the current level of rents has reached the level of 2003. The costs for renting new warehouses in Vilnius, Kaunas, and Klaipėda are similar and reach 0.75 to 1.42 EUR/m^{2}, while the rents of old warehouses are 0.35 to 0.67 EUR/m^{2}.

== International trade ==
Exports of Lithuania by product category (2019) Chemical products Transportation Machines Mineral products Plastics and rubbers Metals Foodstuffs Precious metals Textiles Instruments Animal products Vegetable products Paper goods Footwear and headwear Miscellaneous Stone and glass Wood products Animal and vegetable bi-products Animal hides Arts and antiques Weapons

Lithuanian economy is highly open and International trade is crucial. As a result, the ratio of foreign trade to GDP for Lithuania has often exceeded 100%.

The EU is the biggest trade partner of Lithuania with a 67% of total imports and 61.3% of total exports during 2015. The Commonwealth of Independent States is the second economic union that Lithuania trades the most with, with a share of imports of 25% and a share of exports of 23.9% during the same period. The vast majority of commodities, including oil, gas, and metals have to be imported, mainly from Russia, however in the recent years Lithuania's energy dependence has shifted towards other countries such as Norway and the US. Mineral products constitute 25% of imports and 18% of exports, mainly driven by the presence of ORLEN Lietuva oil refinery with a refining capacity of 9 million tons a year, owned by Polish concern PKN Orlen. Orlen Lietuva sold over €3.5 billion worth of products outside Lithuania, compared to the total Lithuanian exports of €24 billion in 2014.

Some sectors are directed mainly at export markets. Transport and logistics export two-thirds of their products and/or services; the biotechnology industry exports 80%; plastics export 52%; laser technologies export 86%; metal processing, machinery and electric equipment export 64%; furniture and wood processing export 55%; textile and clothing export 76%; and the food industry exports 36%.

Foreign trade partners, January–December 2022 (structure of the statistics is highly affected by oil refinery ORLEN Lietuva importing and exporting big amounts of oil products)
Rank	Country	Combined share	Country	Import	Country	Export	Share of goods of Lithuanian origin in export
–	(European Union) EU	62.7951%	(European Union) EU	63.27%	(European Union) EU	62.23%	65.72%
1	Poland	10.46%	Poland	11.67%	Latvia	12.86%	41.86%
2	Latvia	10.16%	Germany	11.62%	Poland	9.04%	61.42%
3	Germany	9.93%	Latvia	7.87%	Germany	7.93%	75.47%
4	United States	6.52%	United States	7.56%	Russia	6.16%	7.38%
5	Russia	5.50%	Sweden	5.26%	Estonia	5.72%	52.23%
6	Netherlands	4.93%	Russia	4.93%	Netherlands	5.44%	84.46%
7	Sweden	4.73%	Norway	4.84%	United States	5.28%	91.10%
8	Estonia	4.39%	Netherlands	4.50%	Sweden	4.11%	87.66%
9	Norway	3.74%	Saudi Arabia	4.15%	United Kingdom	3.48%	86.66%
10	United Kingdom	3.08%	China	3.78%	Belarus	3.27%	5.39%
11	Italy	2.94%	Italy	3.66%	Ukraine	2.58%	70.47%
12	France	2.45%	Estonia	3.26%	Norway	2.44%	84.71%
13	Saudi Arabia	2.42%	United Kingdom	2.73%	France	2.29%	73.77%
14	Belarus	2.29%	France	2.58%	Denmark	2.27%	84.41%
15	China	2.15%	Finland	2.42%	Italy	2.08%	79.83%
16	Finland	2.13%	Belgium	2.04%	Kazakhstan	1.96%	8.34%
17	Belgium	1.80%	(Czech Republic) Czechia	1.83%	Finland	1.79%	71.15%
18	Denmark	1.70%	Belarus	1.46%	Belgium	1.51%	80.10%
19	Ukraine	1.69%	Spain	1.34%	Spain	1.44%	81.84%
20	(Czech Republic) Czechia	1.52%	Denmark	1.23%	Turkey	1.42%	63.63%

=== Foreign corporate taxpayers ===
Monthly average number of foreign corporate taxpayers, June–December
Country	2025			2024		
Country	Corp	R&S%		Corp	R&S%	
Germany	17,243	#1	▼27.9%	15,308	#1	▼28.8%
Poland	6,194	#2	▲10.0%	5,108	#2	▲9.6%
Italy	4,440	#3	7.2%	3,800	#3	▲7.2%
Netherlands	4,362	#4	▲7.1%	3,735	#4	▼7.0%
United Kingdom	3,741	#5	6.1%	3,255	#5	▼6.1%
France	3,353	#6	▲5.4%	2,688	#6	▲5.1%
Spain	2,695	#7	▲4.4%	2,292	#7	▲4.3%
Austria	1,831	#8	3.0%	1,614	#8	3.0%
Sweden	1,665	#9	2.7%	1,427	#11	▼2.7%
Estonia	1,628	#10	▼2.6%	1,457	#9	▼2.7%
Latvia	1,550	#11	▼2.5%	1,448	#10	▼2.7%
(Czech Republic) Czechia	1,377	#12	▲2.2%	1,128	#13	2.1%
United States	1,355	#13	▲2.2%	1,132	#12	▼2.1%
Belgium	1,115	#14	1.8%	957	#14	1.8%
Denmark	1,065	#15	1.7%	921	#15	1.7%
Total	61,763	100%		53,218	100%	

== Macro-economic indicators ==
The following table shows the IMF-reported main economic indicators in 2000–2025. Inflation below 5% is in green.

Year	GDP per capita (in US$ PPP)	GDP (in bn. US$)		GDP growth (real)	Inflation (in percent)	Unemployment rate (in percent)	Government debt (percentage of GDP)
Year	GDP per capita (in US$ PPP)	(nominal)	(PPP)	GDP growth (real)	Inflation (in percent)	Unemployment rate (in percent)	Government debt (percentage of GDP)
2000	9,932	11.5	34.8	3.3%	1.1%	16.4%	24%
2001	▲10,920	▲12.3	▲37.9	▲6.6%	▲1.5%	▲17.4%	▼23%
2002	▲11,911	▲14.3	▲41.0	▲6.5%	▲0.3%	▼13.7%	▼22%
2003	▲13,535	▲18.8	▲46.2	▲10.5%	▼−1.1%	▼12.4%	▼20%
2004	▲14,942	▲22.7	▲50.5	▲6.3%	▲1.2%	▼10.9%	▼19%
2005	▲16,945	▲26.1	▲56.3	▲8.2%	▲2.7%	▼8.3%	▼18%
2006	▲19,046	▲30.1	▲62.3	▲7.3%	▲3.8%	▼5.8%	▼17%
2007	▲21,992	▲39.8	▲71.1	▲11.1%	▲5.8%	▼4.2%	▼16%
2008	▲23,143	▲48.0	▲74.0	▲2.2%	▲11.1%	▲5.8%	▼15%
2009	▼20,130	▼37.6	▼63.7	▼−14.5%	▲4.2%	▲13.8%	▲28%
2010	▲20,865	▼36.7	▲64.6	▲0.3%	▲1.2%	▲17.8%	▲37%
2011	▲23,162	▲43.2	▲70.1	▲6.3%	▲4.1%	▼15.4%	▲38%
2012	▲24,947	▼42.7	▲74.6	▲4.4%	▲3.2%	▼13.4%	▲40%
2013	▲26,655	▲46.3	▲78.9	▲4.1%	▲1.2%	▼11.8%	▼39%
2014	▲28,371	▲48.4	▲83.3	▲3.8%	▲0.2%	▼10.7%	▲41%
2015	▲29,713	▼41.5	▲86.5	▲2.8%	▼−0.7%	▼9.1%	▲42%
2016	▲31,141	▲43.0	▲89.6	▲2.6%	▲0.7%	▼7.9%	▼40%
2017	▲33,595	▲47.7	▲95.5	▲4.7%	▲3.7%	▼7.1%	▼39%
2018	▲36,497	▲54.3	▲102.9	▲4.8%	▲2.5%	▼6.1%	▼33%
2019	▲40,567	▲55.1	▲114.0	▲4.7%	▲2.2%	▲6.3%	▲36%
2020	▲41,253	▲57.4	▲115.9	0.0%	▲1.1%	▲8.5%	▲46%
2021	▲46,465	▲67.1	▲130.5	▲6.4%	▲4.6%	▼7.1%	▼43%
2022	▲50,568	▲70.7	▲143.2	▲2.4%	▲18.9%	▼6.0%	▼38%
2023	▲52,136	▲80.4	▲149.7	▲0.8%	▲8.7%	▲6.9%	▼37%
2024	▲54,710	▲85.5	▲158.0	▲3.0%	▲0.9%	▲7.1%	▲38%
2025	▲57,818	▲94.9	▲167.1	▲2.9%	▲3.4%	▼6.9%	▲40%
2026	▲61,052	▲105.9	▲176.9	▲2.9%	▲4.0%	▼6.5%	▲45%

== See also ==
- Economy of Europe
