= Work in Lithuania =

Talent attraction initiative

Work in Lithuania is a government-backed talent attraction initiative aimed at attracting highly skilled professionals to work in Lithuania. The platform is administered by Invest Lithuania, the national investment promotion agency of the Republic of Lithuania.

The initiative forms part of Lithuania’s broader economic and innovation policy framework, aligned with European Union efforts to attract and retain skilled labor, particularly in high-growth sectors such as technology and life sciences.

== History ==
Work in Lithuania was launched in October 2017 in response to labor shortages and skills mismatches identified in Lithuania’s labor market, particularly within the technology sector.

Initially focused on encouraging Lithuanian nationals living abroad to return, the program later expanded to target international professionals of all nationalities, reflecting increased global competition for talent.

By 2025, more than 150 international companies were participating in the initiative, offering roles across sectors including information technology, business services, life sciences, manufacturing, and engineering.

== Operations ==
Work in Lithuania primarily operates through an online platform that aggregates job opportunities from international and domestic companies operating in Lithuania. The platform provides relocation guidance, labor market information, and career resources for prospective employees.

The initiative also conducts outreach activities, including webinars and international engagement programs, to connect employers with foreign talent. It collaborates with Lithuanian public institutions such as the Ministry of Social Security and Labour and related national initiatives including Study in Lithuania.

== Organization ==
Work in Lithuania is part of a portfolio of foreign investment and talent development initiatives managed by Invest Lithuania, a public agency headquartered in Vilnius.

Invest Lithuania operates under the Ministry of the Economy and Innovation and is responsible for promoting foreign direct investment, supporting business development, and facilitating international talent acquisition.

== See also ==
- Economy of Lithuania
- Labor market
- Human capital flight
