= Fermentas =

Former medical product company

- Type: Public (NYSE: TMO)
- Founded: 3 March 1994
- Headquarters: Waltham, Massachusetts, USA
- Key people: Marc N. Casper (President & CEO)
- Revenue: 1,476,888,454 (2022)
- Net income: 554,487,842 (2022)
- Total assets: 736,264,315 (2022)
- Number of employees: 1,520 (2022)
- Parent: Thermo Fisher Scientific
- Website: www.thermofisher.com

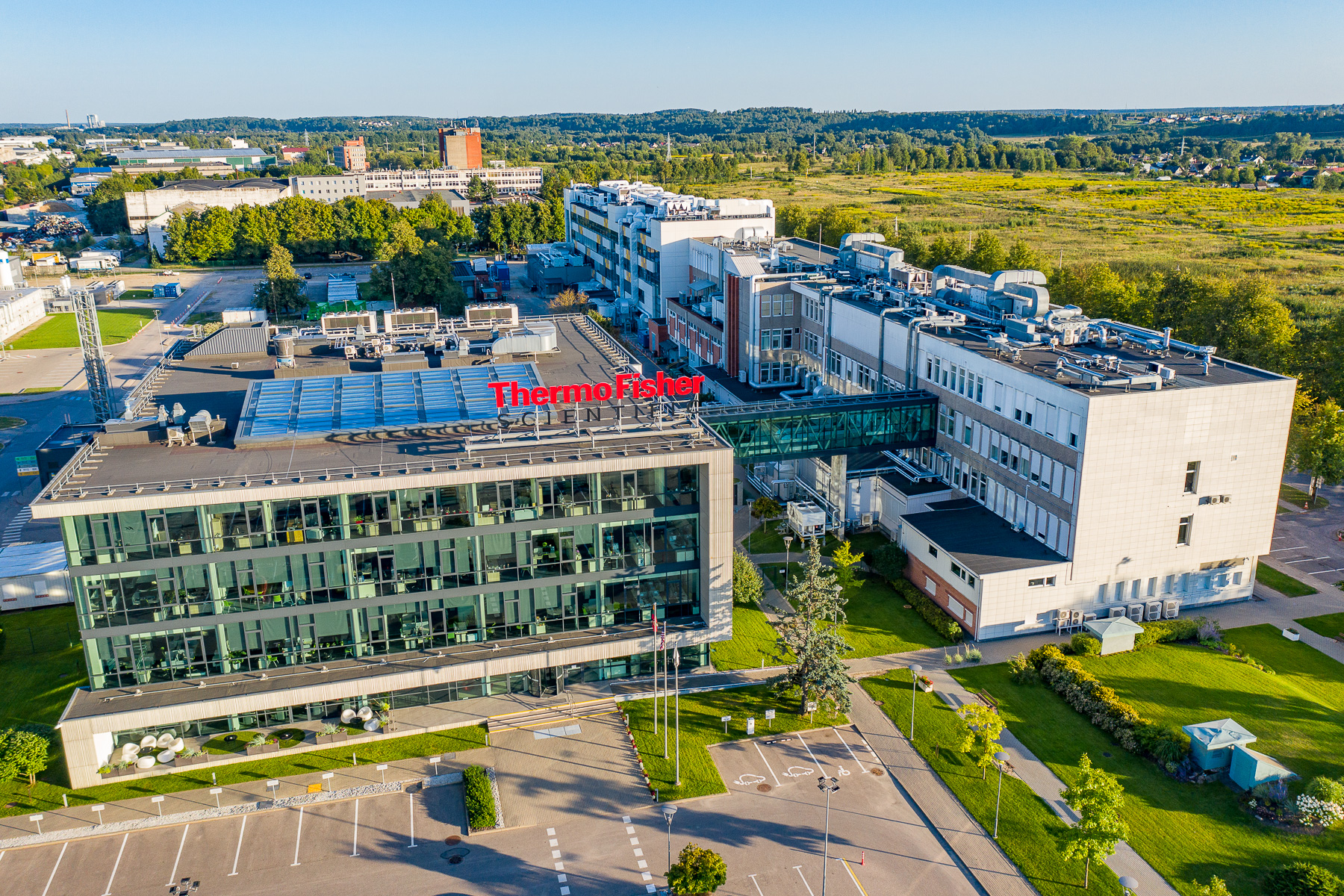
Headquarters in Vilnius

Fermentas was a biotechnology company specializing in the discovery and production of molecular biology products for life science research and diagnostics. In 2010, Fermentas was acquired by Thermo Fisher Scientific for $260M.

== Corporate profile ==
In 2003, Fermentas consolidated its international business and set up a controlling enterprise, Fermentas International, in Canada. Fermentas International became the shareholder of Fermentas in Vilnius, Lithuania, and its joint ventures in the United States, Canada and Germany (as well as Fermentas China established in 2009).

In 2010, Fermentas International was acquired by Thermo Fisher Scientific for $260M. Fermentas, and all of its enterprises, became part of the Analytical Technology segment of the Thermo Fisher.

Fermentas has principal manufacturing operations in Vilnius, Lithuania. More than 99% of production was destined for export markets.

== Products ==
Fermentas is a producer of molecular biology products and is known for its restriction enzymes and DNA ladders and molecular weight markers.

The company's main products are FastDigest and conventional restriction enzymes, DNA/RNA modifying enzymes, transfection reagents, nucleotides and primers, products of PCR and RT-PCR, molecular cloning, nucleic acid purification, in vitro transcription, molecular labeling and detection, DNA, RNA, protein electrophoresis.

All Fermentas’ products are produced in Class D clean-room facilities, qualified and certified as per EU directives and International Society for Pharmaceutical Engineering (ISPE) guidelines, which are prerequisite for GMP manufacturing. The company is operating under ISO9001, ISO13485 quality and ISO14001 environmental management systems.
