= Kėdainiai Free Economic Zone =

Coordinates: 55°15′55″N 23°59′44″E

- Company type: UAB
- Industry: Tax-free zone. Logistics, warehouse, manufacturing, industry
- Founded: 2012 m.
- Headquarters: A. Goštauto str. 40A, LT-03163 Vilnius, Lithuania
- Key people: Artūras Klangauskas
- Revenue: 922,000 € (2023)
- Owner: Kėdainių laisvoji ekonominė zona, UAB
- Website: Official website

Kėdainiai Free Economic Zone (Lithuanian: Kėdainių laisvoji ekonominė zona) is a special economic zone located in Kėdainiai, Lithuania. It has 130.55 ha area, which was established in 2012 for 49 years.

== FEZ companies ==
The industrial and medical gas company AGA investing 20M EUR into an oxygen and nitrogen gas factory which will serve a growing demand in the Baltic region market. It will be built by Linde Engineering. The factory is expected to launch in 2020. In 2018 Natūralus Pluoštas UAB launched a hemp stalks processing plant. The factory produces textile hemp fiber.

== Tax incentives ==
Taxes	Usual tax rates	Taxes FEZ %
Corporate profit tax	15 %	0 (first 6 years), 7,5 (next 10 years)
Real estate tax	0,3 - 3%	0%
Dividend tax	15%	0%
