= Vytinė =

Lithuanian riverine merchant vessel

Vytinė (from Lithuanian vytelė - withe, twig) was a type of Lithuanian trading vessel used from the 15th century up to the 20th century. It was a flat-bottomed, river-borne sailboat, 30-55 m long. Vytinė ships mainly transported timber, grains, and flax fiber down the Nemunas River, starting in Grodno in the east and ending in Königsberg in the west. It is thought that the vytinė boat was used for shipping goods to Danzig as well.

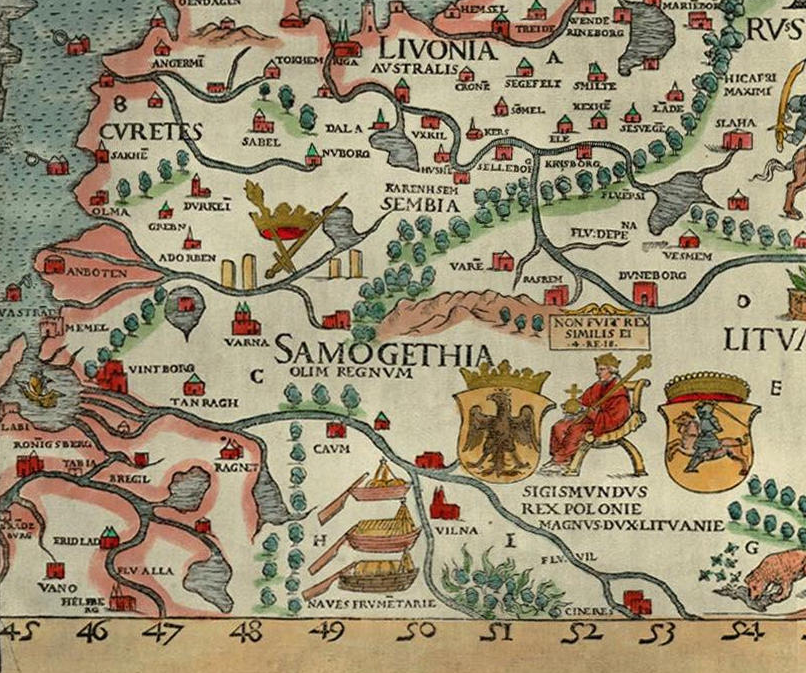
Portion of the Carta Marina depicting vytinė ships – naves frumentarie, crop (trading) vessels

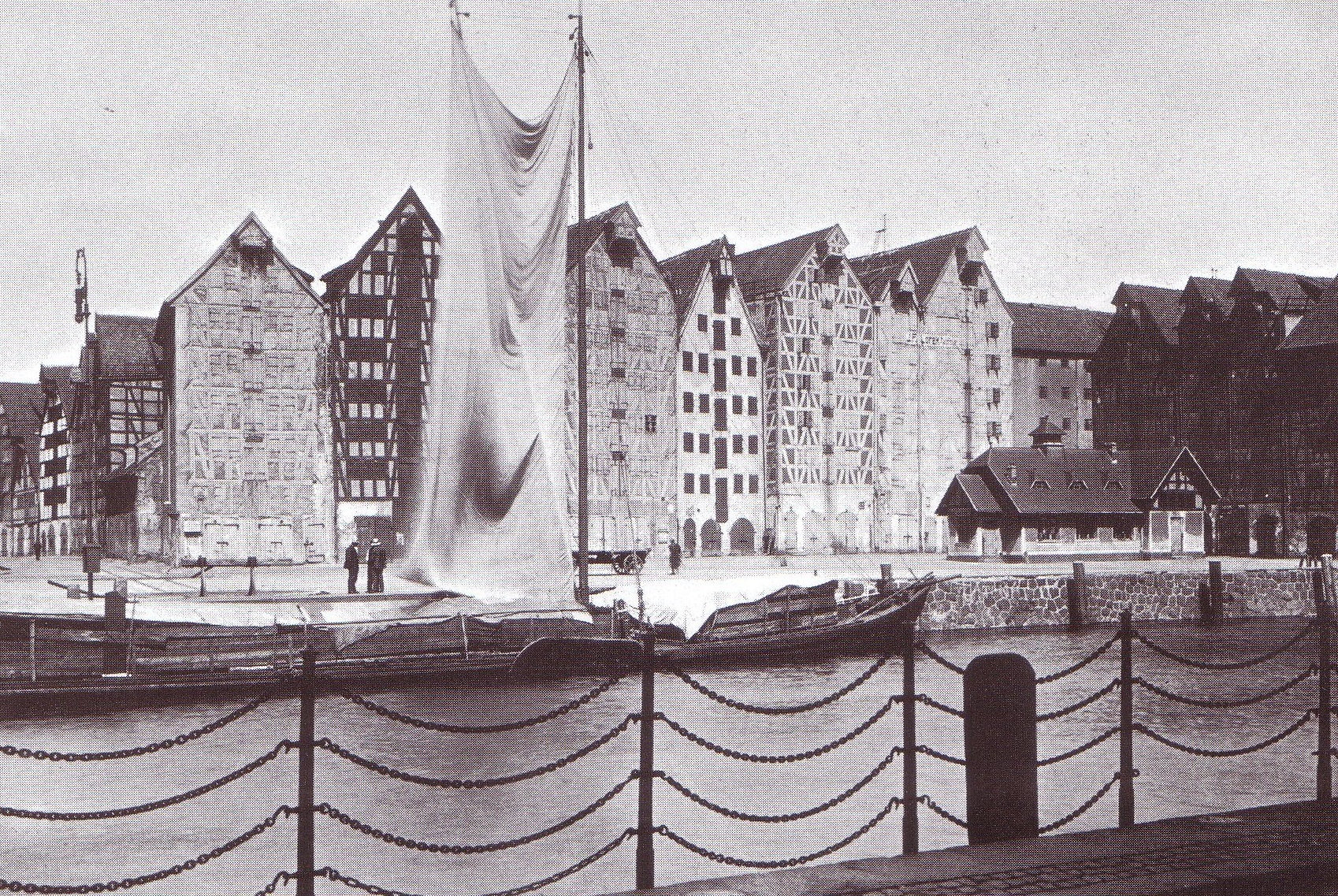
Vytinė in Königsberg

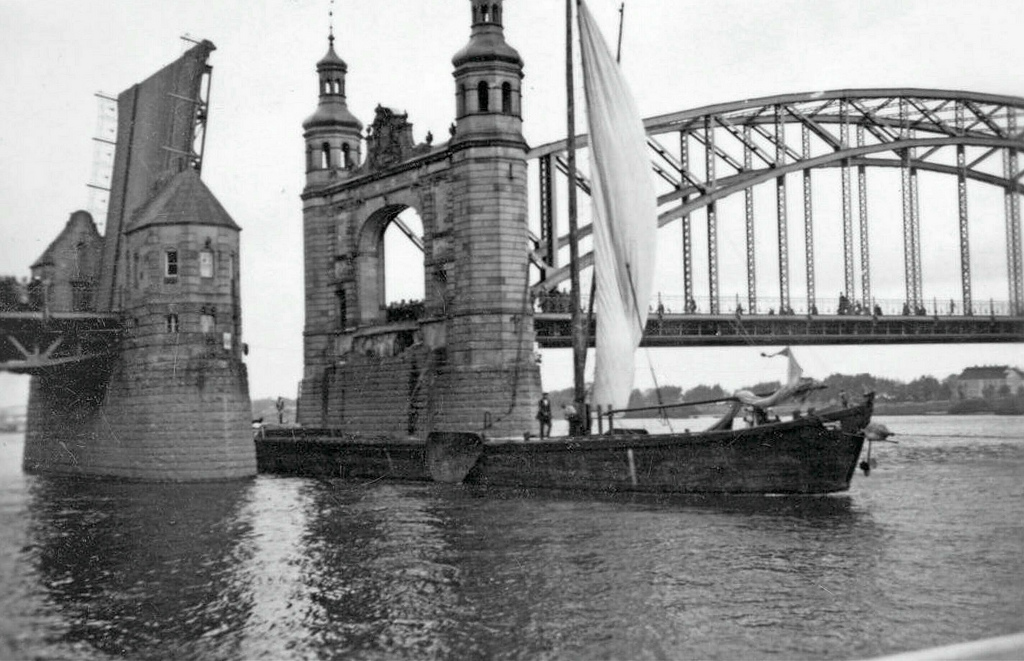
Vytinė passing the Queen Luise Bridge
