= Akmenė Free Economic Zone =

Coordinates: 56°18′22″N 22°53′28″E

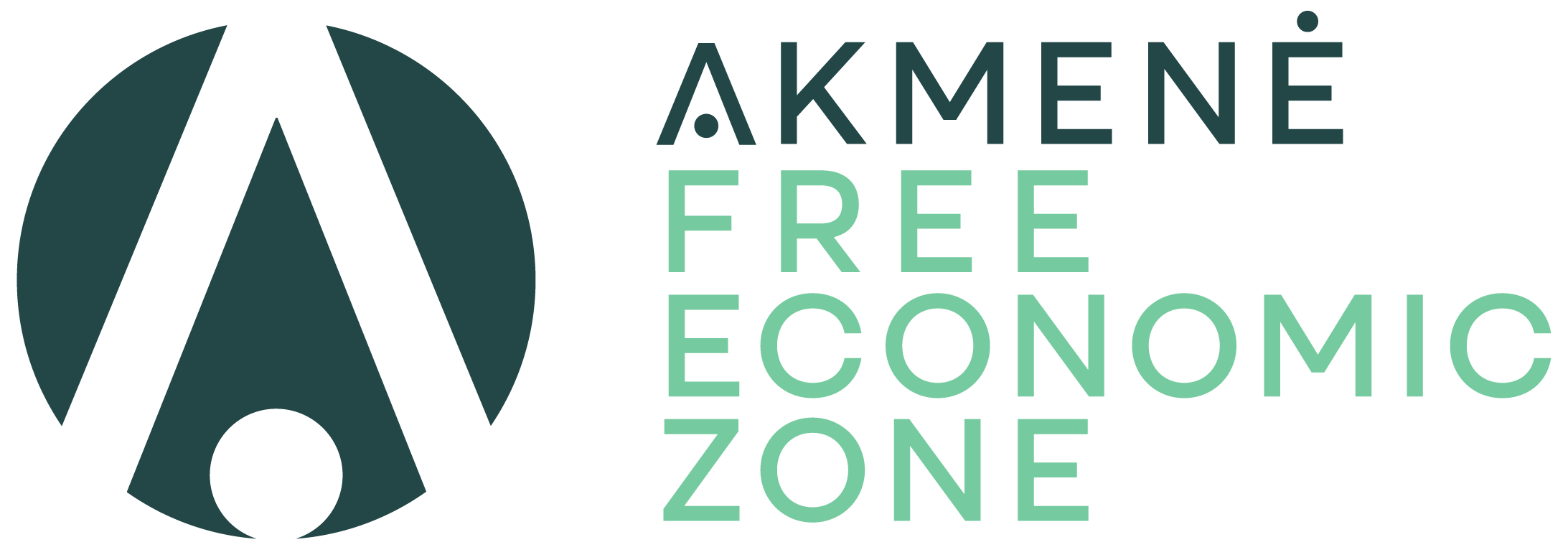
- Type: UAB
- Industry: Free economic zone. Specializing in wood, construction, energy, logistics and other industries
- Founded: 2012. Operations started in 2019
- Headquarters: Ryto g. 4, Menčiai, Akmenė district municipality, Lithuania, Lithuania
- Key people: Lina Mockutė, CEO
- Owner: Akmenės laisvoji ekonominė zona, UAB

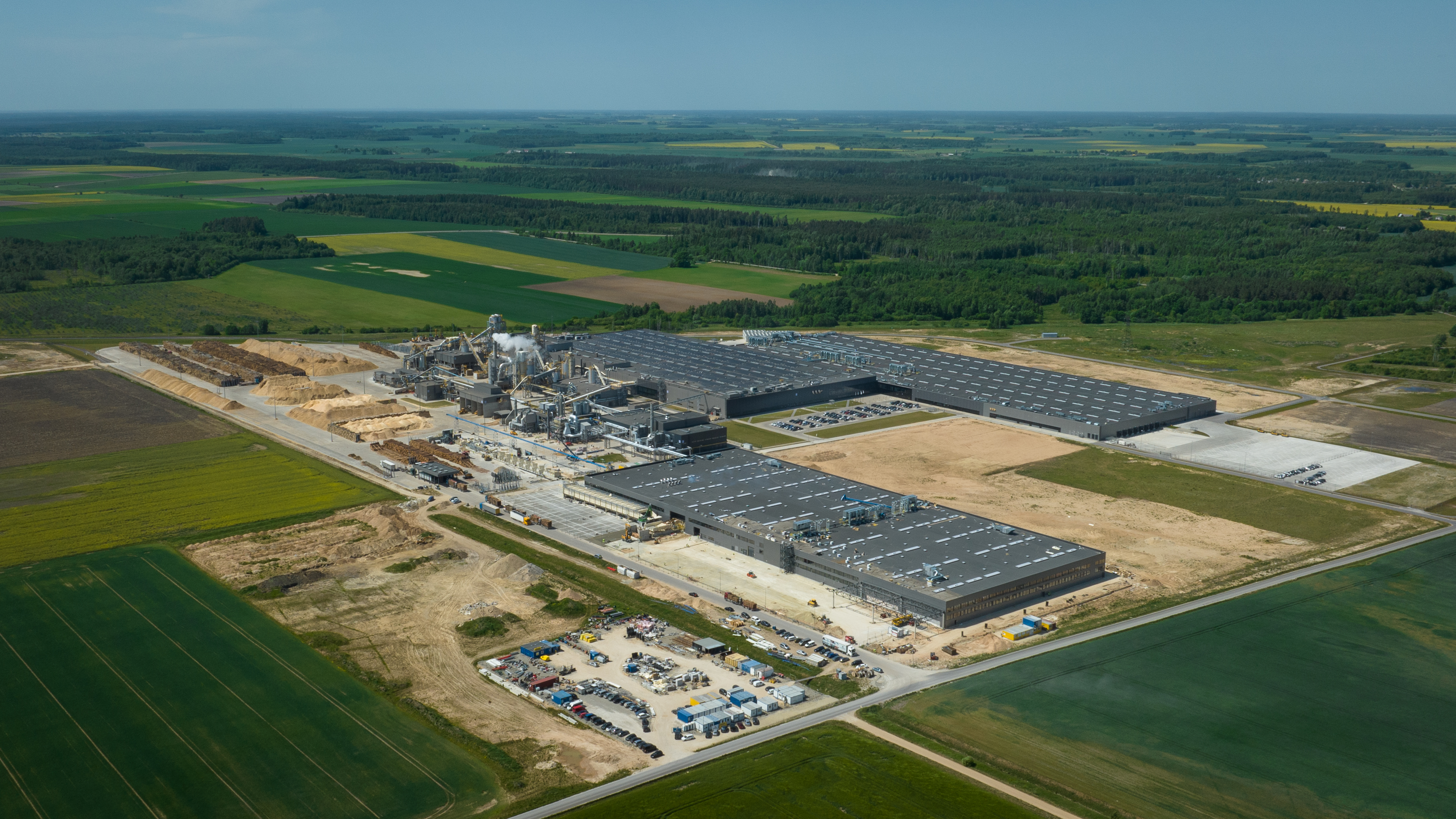
Akmenė FEZ territory

Akmenė Free Economic Zone (FEZ) is a special economic zone located in Akmenė, Lithuania. It is 98.6 ha area, which was established in 2012 and managed by UAB Akmenės laisvoji ekonominė zona since 2018.

== FEZ companies ==
Since 2019, more than 300 million euros were invested at Akmenė FEZ by companies operating in areas of wood, construction component manufacturing, energy and other industries. In 2022, the total turnover of Akmenė FEZ investors reached 62,1 million euros.

As of 2023, Akmenė FEZ hosts:

- VMG Wood Solutions - wood veneer panel manufacturer
- VMG Akmenės baldai - furniture manufacturer
- VMG Lignum construction - wooden construction material manufacturer
- VMG Service Akmenė - process automation and equipment maintenance service provider
- Rietuva - energy provider

== Infrastructure ==
The free zone features a railway line, internal road infrastructure, water and gas mains, a sewage system and a bicycle path to the city. The FEZ management company leases 0,9 - 26,3 ha land plots.

== Tax incentives ==
Taxes	Usual tax rates	Taxes FEZ %
Corporate profit tax	15 %	0 (first 10 years), 7,5 (next 6 years)
Real estate tax	0,3 - 3%	0%
Dividend tax	15%	0%
