= Šiauliai Free Economic Zone =

Coordinates: 55°54′43″N 23°22′28″E

- Type: UAB
- Industry: Tax free zone. Logistics, warehouse, manufacturing, industry
- Founded: 1996 m.
- Headquarters: A. Goštauto str. 40A, LT-03163 Vilnius, Lithuania
- Key people: Artūras Klangauskas
- Owner: Šiaulių laisvoji ekonominė zona, UAB
- Website: Official website

Šiauliai Free Economic Zone is a special economic zone located in Šiauliai, Lithuania. It has an area of 133 ha, and a 15MW power supply capability. The zone is focused on engineering industries: metal, plastics, textiles and electronics. The FEZ is close to the airport and major roads. Originally established in 1996, it closed later and then re-opened in 2015.

== FEZ companies ==
Dental products manufacturer Medicinos linija UAB, outdoor advertising manufacturer Reklamos diktatorius UAB, a Dutch company Formula Air, producing air filtration systems, American window manufacturer and supplier Intus Windows.

== Tax incentives ==
Taxes	Usual tax rates	Taxes FEZ %
Corporate profit tax	15%	0 (first 6 years), 7,5 (next 10 years)
Real estate tax	0,3 – 3%	0%
Dividend tax	15%	0%
