= Marijampolė Free Economic Zone =

Coordinates: 54°34′47.473″N 23°24′1.113″E

Marijampolė Free Economic Zone (Baltic FEZ)
- Company type: Marijampolės laisvosios ekonominės zonos valdymo bendrovė, UAB
- Industry: Tax free zone. Industry focus: science, forestry, metals, food processing, value added logistics and others.
- Founded: 2013, Lithuania
- Headquarters: Kauno g. 15, Marijampolė, Lithuania
- Key people: Simonas Petrulis
- Website: www.balticfez.com

Marijampolė Free Economic Zone or Baltic FEZ (Lithuanian: Marijampolės laisvoji ekonominė zona) is a special economic zone located in Marijampolė, Lithuania. It has 77.73 ha area, which was established in 2011 December 23 near European route E67 and Rail Baltica. The zone was established for 49 years, specialize in four industries: Science, Forestry, Metalworking and Food processing, and is oriented to the investors from Lithuania and foreign countries.

== Infrastructure ==
Marijampolė FEZ has 15 industrial type plots from which some are dedicated for medium-level pollution businesses. Using European Regional Development Funds every plot was developed with essential infrastructure: electricity, water, drainage, C and D class roads, lighting and gas pipelines as needed. There is also a planned connection to fast railway Rail Baltica.

== Companies ==
In 2018 Danish manufacturer Dovista plans to invest over €100 million over the next ten years to open new manufacturing line in Baltic FEZ. In 2018 May there was 20 ha of unoccupied industrial plots left. It is planned to expand FEZ territory as by Marijampolė region development strategy and international investors suggestions.
