= Girteka =

Transport company

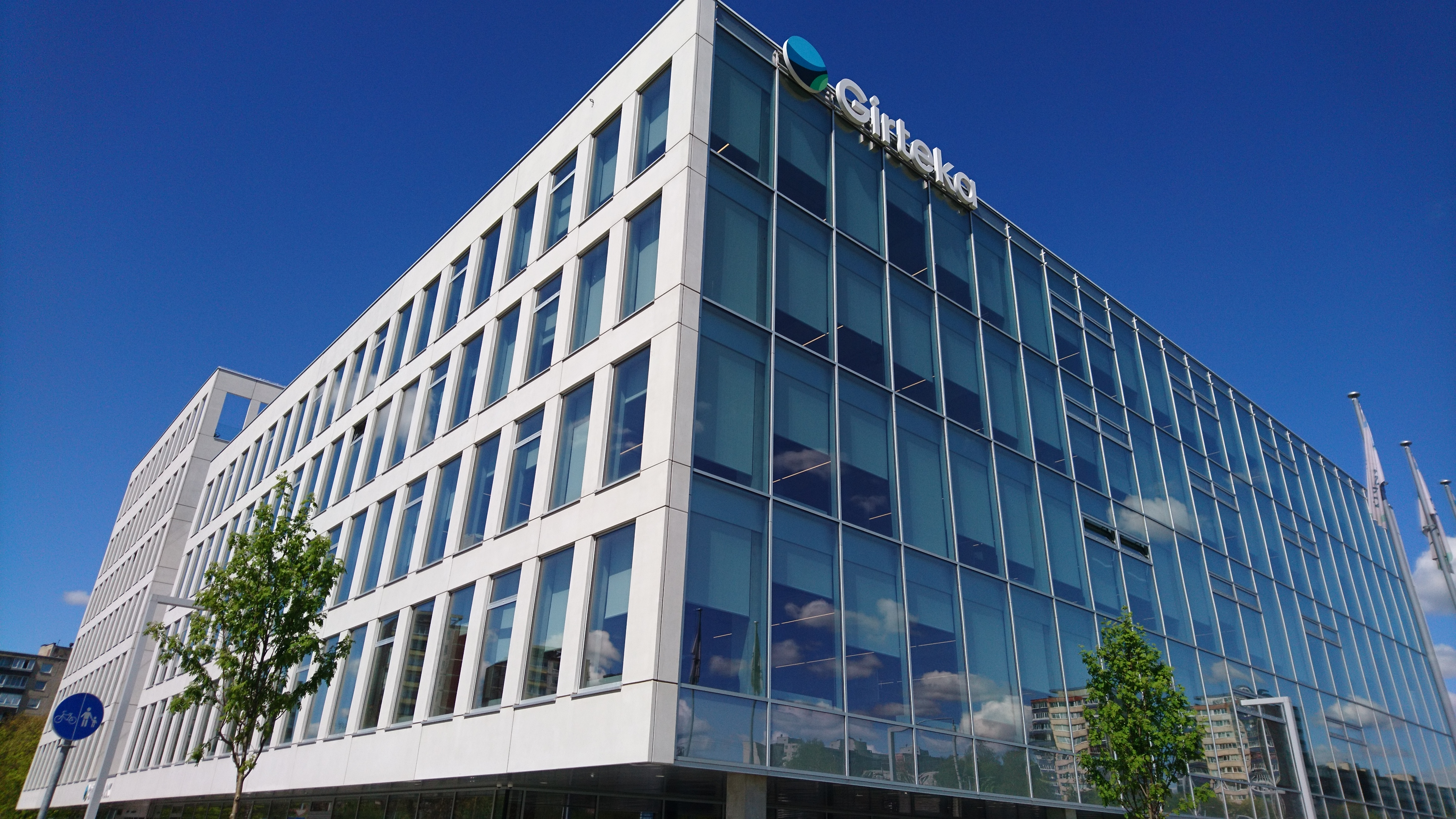
- Headquarters in Vilnius
- Type: Privately held corporate group
- Industry: Logistics
- Founder: Mindaugas Raila
- Headquarters: Vilnius, Lithuania
- Area served: Europe
- Key people: Edvardas Liachovičius (CEO, Girteka Group) Pavel Kveten (CEO, Girteka Logistics)
- Services: Temperature-controlled and high-value cargo transportation.
- Revenue: €1.93 billion (2022)
- Operating income: €164 million (2021)
- Net income: €67 million (2021)
- Total assets: €1.021 billion (2021)
- Total equity: €0.274 billion (2021)
- Number of employees: 13,000 (2025)
- Website: girteka.eu

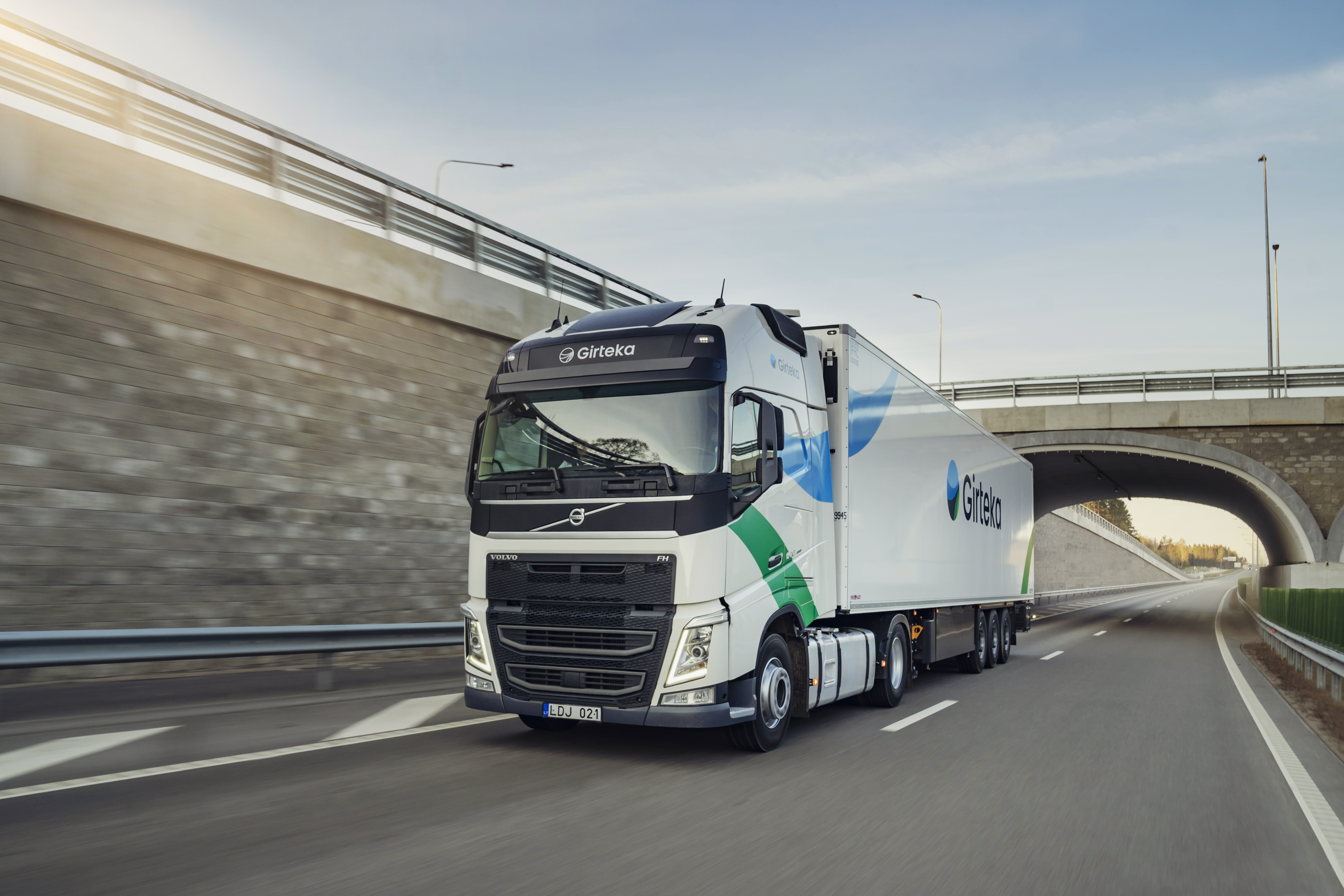
Girteka Road Transport Truck

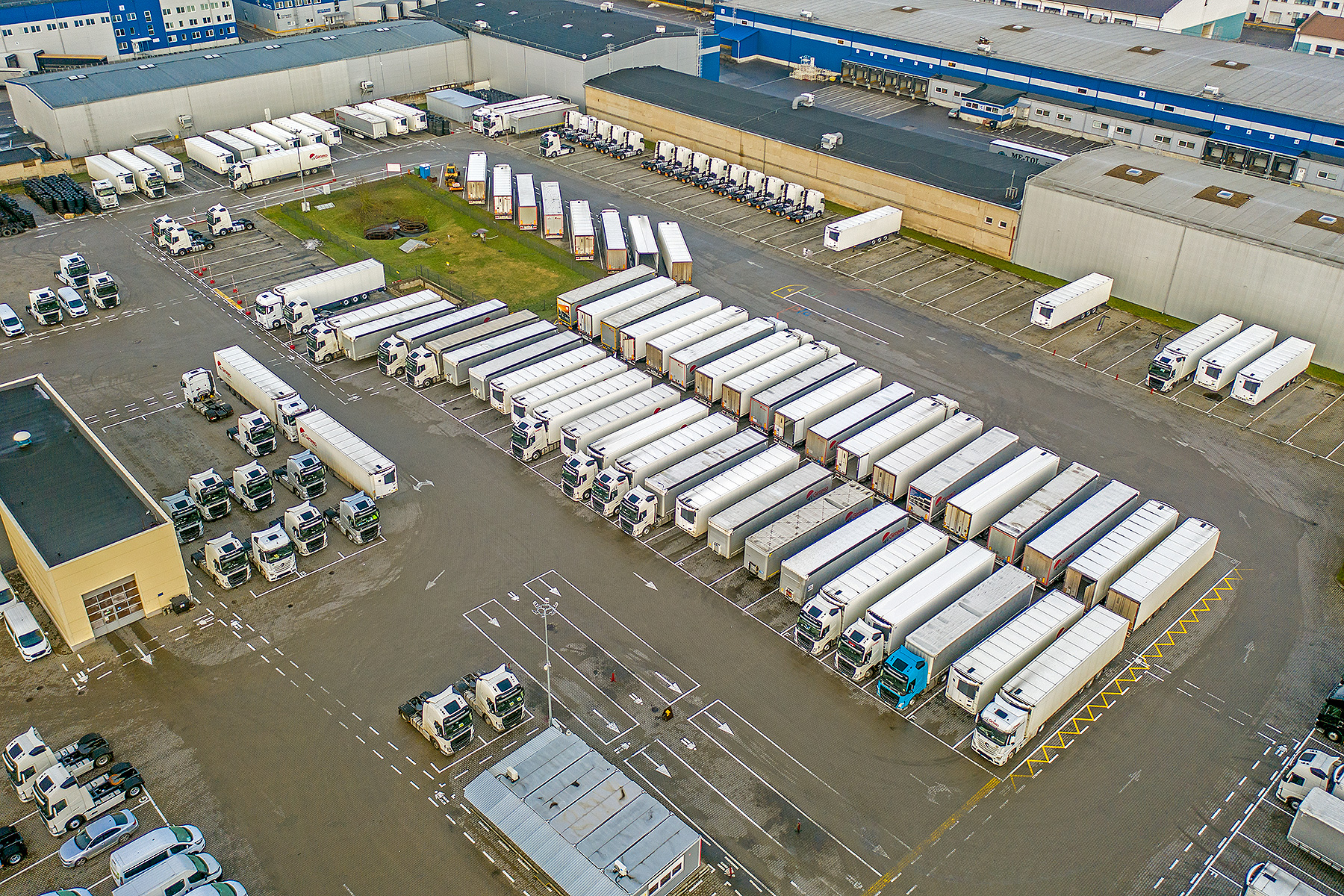
Girteka trucks in Vilnius

Girteka is a Lithuanian transport and logistics company based in the city of Vilnius, operating in Europe and Scandinavia. It was founded in 1996 by Mindaugas Raila who, at the age of 24, bought a single used truck complete with a trailer.

Today, it is one of Europe's largest asset-based logistics companies. Girteka delivers more than 700,000 full truck loads (FTLs) every year, with more than 6,000 fully owned trucks and 7,000 trailers that operate across mainland Europe, the UK, and Scandinavia. Up to 95% of jobs are dispatched electronically, resulting in 97–99% DIFOT.

Today, the company employs more than 13,000 people from more than 20 nationalities. Girteka has offices in Lithuania, Poland, Georgia, Denmark, Norway, Finland, Spain, Netherlands, Belgium, Ukraine, Belarus, Kazakhstan, and Kyrgyzstan.

== Scope of Services ==
Girteka specializes in temperature-controlled and high-value cargo transportation across the continent, delivering a wide range of goods, including fresh, chilled, frozen, and processed foods.

Focusing on the following operational segments within road transportation:

1. Food and Beverage
2. Electronics and High-Tech
3. Healthcare and Pharma
4. Fast Moving Consumer Goods (FMCG)
5. Retail
6. E-commerce and Parcels
7. Automotive
8. Industrial and Manufacturing
9. Fashion and Lifestyle
10. Agricultural
11. Cosmetics and Hygiene
12. Chemicals
