= List of free-trade zones =

This is a list of free-trade zones by country:

== Africa ==
=== Morocco ===
- Tanger Free Zone
- Atlantic Free Zone Kenitra
- Free Zones at Tanger Med Ksar el Majaz Mellousa 1 and 2
- Free Zone in Dakhla and Laayoune:
- Free Storage Zone of hydrocarbons: Kebdana and Nador

=== Egypt ===
Egypt has nine free-trade zones:

- Alexandria Public free Zone
- Damietta Public Free Zone
- Ismailia Public Free Zone
- Keft Public Free Zone
- Media Production City Free Zone
- Nasr City Public Free Zone
- Port Said Public Free Zone
- Shebin El Kom Public Free Zone
- Suez Public Free Zone

=== Djibouti ===
- Djibouti Free Zone

=== Eritrea ===
- Massawa Free Trade Zone.

=== Gabon ===
- Zone économique spéciale de Nkok, at 30 km of Libreville

=== Ghana ===
- Tema Export Processing Zone
- Shama Land Bank

=== Kenya ===
There are about 40 Export Processing Zones with "close to 40,000 workers employed and contribution of 10.7 % of national exports. Over 70% of EPZ output is exported to the USA under AGOA".

=== Libya ===
- Misrata Free Trade Zone

=== Namibia ===
- Walvis Bay Export Processing Zone
- Oshikango (namibia-Angola)Border Export Processing Zone

=== Nigeria ===
- Aluminium Smelter Company Free Trade Zone
- Border Free Trade
- Calabar Free Trade Zone
- Centenary Economic City
- Enugu Industrial Park (Free Zone Status), also known as, ENPOWER
- Kano Free Trade Zone
- Ibom Science & Technology Park Free Zone
- Lekki Free Trade Zone
- Maigatari Border Free Trade Zone
- Nigeria International Commerce city
- Onne Oil and Gas Free Trade Zone
- Ogun-Guangdong Free Trade Zone
- Illela International Border Market
- LADOL Free Zone
- Lagos Free Trade Zone
- Snake Island Free Trade Zone
- Tinapa Resort & Leisure Free Trade Zone
- NAHCO Free Trade Zone

=== Tanzania ===
- Benjamin William Mkapa Special Economic Zone

=== Togo ===
- Port of Lome Free Trade Zone/Export processing zone

=== Tunisia ===
- Bizerte
- Zarzis

== Seychelles ==
- International Trade Zone

== Americas ==
=== Argentina ===
- General Pico
- Río Gallegos y Caleta Olivia
- La Plata
- Tierra del Fuego Province

=== Bahamas ===
- Freeport, Bahamas

=== Brazil ===
- Free Economic Zone of Manaus

=== Canada ===
- CentrePort Canada - Winnipeg, Manitoba
- Calgary Region Inland Port FTZ - Calgary, Alberta
- Port Alberta - Edmonton, Alberta
- Halifax, Nova Scotia - Halifax Gateway - Halifax, Nova Scotia
- Global Transportation Hub Authority - Regina, Saskatchewan
- Regional Municipality of Niagara - Niagara Trade Zone - Thorold, Ontario
- Cape Breton Regional Municipality - CBRM Foreign Trade Zone (Sydney), Nova Scotia
- Windsor-Essex Foreign Trade Zone - Windsor, Ontario
- Saint John, New Brunswick - Foreign Trade Zone - Saint John, New Brunswick

=== Chile ===
- Zona Franca of Iquique

=== Colombia ===
- Zona Franca del Pacifico - Cali-Palmira, Colombia.
- Zona Franca Bogota - Bogota-Cundinamarca, Colombia
- Zona Franca de Cucuta
- Zona Franca Metropolitana S.a.s
- Zona Franca de Occidente
- Zona Franca Santander
- Zona Franca de Tocancipa S.a
- Zona Franca de Barranquilla
- Zona Franca Brisa S.a
- Zona Franca La Cayena
- Zona Franca Las Americas
- Zona Franca La Cayena (Barranquilla, Atlantico)

=== Dominican Republic ===
- Zona Franca Industrial La Palma LTD - Santiago
- Nigua Free Zone - Santo Domingo

=== El Salvador ===
- Zona Franca Santa Ana

=== Guatemala ===
- Zolic

=== Haiti ===
- Lafito Industrial Free Zone

=== Jamaica ===
- Jamaican Free Zones

=== Mexico ===
- Maquiladoras

=== Panama ===
- Colon Free Trade Zone

=== Paraguay ===
- Ciudad del Este

=== Peru ===
- Zona Franca of Tacna - ZOFRATACNA
- CETICOS Matarani
- CETICOS Ilo
- CETICOS Paita

=== Uruguay ===
- Aguada Park (Itsen S.A.)-Uruguay
- Parque de las Ciencias (Parque de las Ciencias S.A.)-Uruguay
- WTC Free Zone (WTC Free Zone S.A.)-Uruguay
- Zona Franca de Colonia (Grupo Continental S.A.)-Uruguay
- Zona Franca Colonia Suiza (Colonia Suiza S.A.)-Uruguay
- Zona Franca Floridasur (Florida S.A.)-Uruguay
- Zona Franca Libertad (Lideral S.A.)-Uruguay
- Zona Franca Nueva Palmira (Nueva Palmira)-Uruguay
- Zona Franca Río Negro (Río Negro S.A.)-Uruguay
- Zona Franca Rivera (Rivera)-Uruguay
- Zona Franca UPM (UPM Fray Bentos S.A.)-Uruguay
- Zonamerica Business & Technology Park - Uruguay

== Asia ==
=== Bahrain ===
- Bahrain Logistics Zone

=== Bangladesh ===
- Bangladesh Export Processing Zone Authority
- Chittagong Export Processing Zone
- Karnaphuli Export Processing Zone
- Dhaka Export Processing Zone
- Comilla Export Processing Zone
- Adamjee Export Processing Zone
- Mongla Export Processing Zone
- Ishwardi Export Processing Zone
- Uttara Export Processing Zone

=== China ===
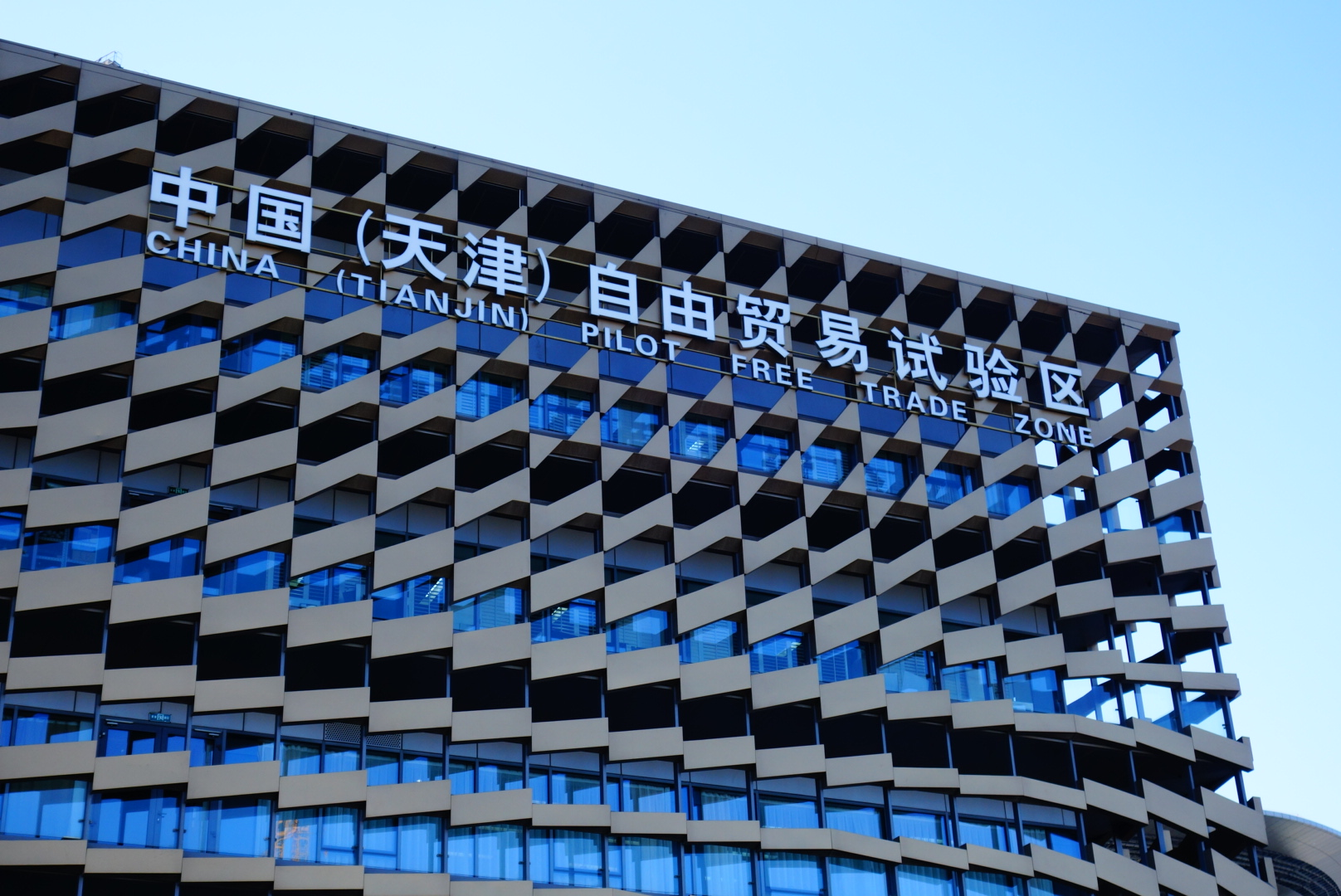
Tianjin Free-Trade Zone

- Jiujiang Free-Trade Zone
- Tianjin Free-Trade Zone
- Shanghai Free-Trade Zone
- Fujian Free-Trade Zone
- Guangdong Free-Trade Zone
- Liaoning Free Trade Zone
- Zhejiang Zone
- Henan Free Trade Zone
- Hubei Free Trade Zone
- Sichuan Free Trade Zone
- Shaanxi Free Trade Zone
- Chongqing Free Trade Zone

=== India ===
- Kandla Special Economic Zone, India. India was one of the first in Asia to recognize the effectiveness of the Export Processing Zone (EPZ) model in promoting exports, with Asia's first EPZ set up in Kandla in 1965. With a view to overcome the shortcomings experienced on account of the multiplicity of controls and clearances; absence of world-class infrastructure, and an unstable fiscal regime and with a view to attract larger foreign investments in India, the Special Economic Zones (SEZs) Policy was announced in April 2000.

SuRSEZ is the First Operating Zone in the private sector in India. The track record of SuRSEZ in the last 5 years speaks for itself. From a level of about Rs.62 crores in 2000–01, exports from SuRSEZ rose to Rs. 2400 crores in the year 2005–06.

- AMRL SEZ and FTWZ in Nanguneri Taluk of Tirunelvelli District is spread over 2518 Acres of development. Out of which 1618 acres are dedicated for multiproduct industrial space; 800 acres are planned for lifestyle zone and 100 acres of Free Trade and Warehousing Zone in south Tamil Nadu is being developed. The FTWZ has a grade A warehouse 100,000 sq ft out of which approximately 20,000 sq ft is already occupied.
- Inspira Pharma and Renewable Energy Park, Aurangabad, Maharashtra, India
- Sricity Multi product SEZ, part of Sricity which is a developing satellite city in Andhra Pradesh, India
- Arshiya International Ltd, India's first Free Trade and Warehousing Zone The largest multi-product free-trade and warehousing infrastructure in India. Arshiya's first 165-acre FTWZ is operational in Panvel, Mumbai, and is to be followed by one in Khurja near Delhi. Arshiya's Mega Logistics Hub at Khurja to have 135 acre FTWZ, 130 acre Industrial and Distribution Hub (Distripark) & 50 acre Rail siding. Arshiya International will be developing three more Free Trade and Warehousing zones in Central, South and East of India.
- Cochin Special Economic Zone is a Special Economic Zone in Cochin, in the State of Kerala in southwest India, set up for export- oriented ventures. The Special Economic Zone is a foreign territory within India with special rules for facilitating foreign direct investment. The Zone is run directly by the Government of India. Cochin SEZ is a multi-product Zone. Cochin is strategically located. It is in southwest India, just 11 nautical miles off the international sea route from Europe to the Pacific Rim. Cochin is being developed by the Dubai Ports International as a container transhipment terminal with direct sailings to important markets of the world, which could position it as Hub for South Asia.
- Astromar Freezone - Astromar Free Trade Warehousing Zone is one of the fastest growing and most cost-effective Free Trade Warehousing Zone in Chennai. Our facility near Chennai's sea gateways is dedicated to facilitating Foreign Trade and Warehousing Zone (FTWZ).
- Onnsynex Ventures Private Limited (OSV FTWZ)- Onnsynex Ventures (OSV) has several professionally managed Free Trade Warehousing Zones in Noida, Mumbai, Chennai, Gujarat. OSV FTWZ is a fully automated warehousing zone which offers several tax and duty benefits to global businesses wanting to set up business in India without compliance and duty restrictions.
- Hardware Park, Hyderabad
- Madras Export Processing Zone

=== Indonesia ===
- Batam Free Trade Zone
- Bintan Free Trade Zone
- Karimun Free Trade Zone
- Sabang Free Trade Zone
- Tanjung Pinang Free Trade Zone

=== Iran ===
- Anzali Free Zone, Gilan province
- Aras Free Zone, East Azerbaijan province
- Arvand Free Zone, Khouzestan province
- Chabahar Free Trade-Industrial Zone
- Kish Island, Hormozgan Province
- Maku Free Zone, West Azarbaijan province
- Sarakhs Free Zone, Razavi Khorasan province
- Dogharoon Free Zone, Razavi Khorasan province
- Qeshm Island, Hormozgan province
- Imam Khomeini Airport city Free Zone, Tehran Province
- Farzazan Pars Company, Tehran Province

=== Israel ===
- Eilat Free Trade Zone

=== Japan ===
- Okinawa FTZ Naha, Okinawa, Japan and Nakagusuku Free Trade Zone

=== Jordan ===
- Diamonds Private Free zone
- Aqaba Special Economic Zone Authority
- Jordan Media City

=== Korea, North ===
- Rason Special Economic Zone

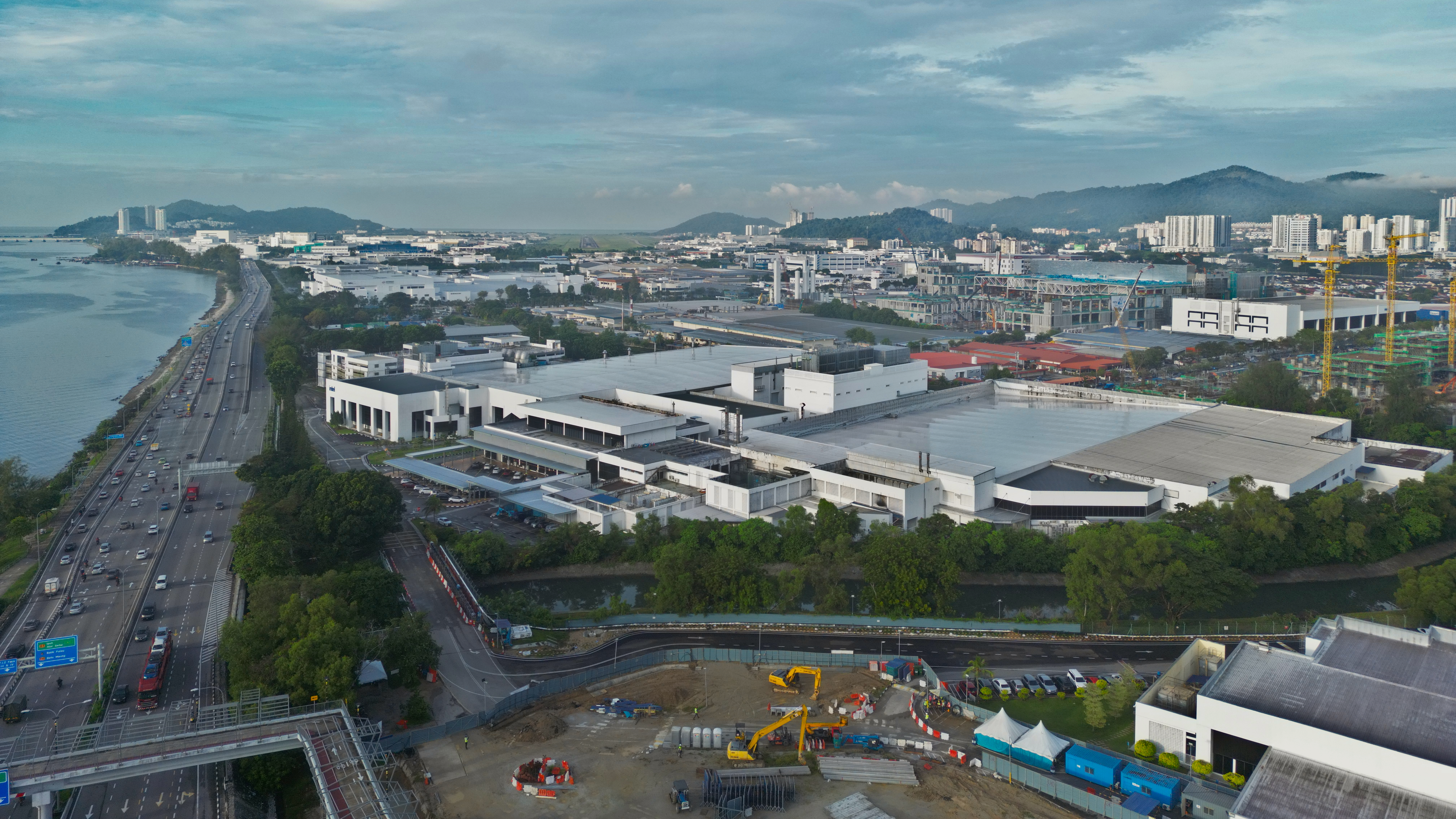
The Bayan Lepas Free Industrial Zone, also known as the Silicon Valley of the East

=== Malaysia ===
- Bayan Lepas Free Industrial Zone, George Town, Penang
- Hulu Klang Free Trade Zone (Statchippac, Texas Instrument)
- Kulim Hi-Tech Park, Kedah
- Melaka Batu Berendam Free Trade Zone (Texas Instrument, Dominant Semiconductor, Panasonic)
- Pasir Gudang Free Trade Zone, Johor
- Port Klang Free Zone, Klang, Selangor
- Sungai Way Free Trade Zone (Western Digital, Free Scale, etc.)
- Teluk Panglima Garang Free Trade Zone (Toshiba, etc.)
- Port of Tanjung Pelepas Free Zone, Johor

=== Oman ===
- Al-Mazyunah Free Zone
- Special Economic Zone at Duqm
- Salalah Free Zone, Salalah (www.sfzco.com)
- Sohar Free Zone, Sohar (www.soharportandfreezone.com)

=== Pakistan ===
- Gawadar port free trade zone
- Karachi Export Processing Zone

=== Philippines ===
Agro-Industrial Economic Zones in the Philippines
Name	Location	Developer/Operator	Region	Area (Hectares)
Agrotex Gensan Economic Zone	"Barrio Tambler, General Santos"	"Agrotex Commodities, Inc."	R-XII	11
AJMR Agro-Industrial Economic Zone	"AJMR Port Complex, Km. 20 Tibungco, Davao City"	AJMR Port Services Corporation	R-XI	8.96
Balo-i Agro-Industrial Economic Zone	"Barangay Maria Cristina, Balo-i, Lanao del Norte"	Balo-i Industrial. Inc.	R-X	13.9
Carmen Cebu Gum Industrial Zone	"Cogon West, Carmen, Cebu City"	Pacific Poly Gums Holdings Corporation	R-VII	7.6
CIIF Agro-Industrial Park - Davao	"KM 9.5, Barangay Sasa, Davao City"	"CIIF Agro-Industrial Park, Inc."	R-XI	8.54
DADC Economic Zone	"Barangay Darong, Municipality of Santa Cruz, Province of Davao del Sur"	Darong Agricultural and Development Corp.	R-XI	15
Ecofuel Agro-Industrial Ecozone	"Sta. Filomena, San Mariano, Isabela"	"Ecofuel Land Development, Inc."	R-II	24
Kamanga Agro-Industrial Economic Zone	"Brgy. Kamanga, Municipality of Maasim, Province of Sarangani"	Kamanga Agro-Industrial Ecozone Development Corporation	R-XII	54.6
New Jubilee Agro-Industrial Economic Zone	"Barangay Hilapnitan, Municipality of Baybay, Province of Leyte"	"New Jubilee International Holdings, Inc."	R-VIII	4.98
Philippine Packing Agricultural Export Processing Zone	"Bugo, Cagayan de Oro"	Philippine Packing Management Services Corporation	R-X	27
Samar Agro-Industrial Economic Zone	"Barangay Malajog, Tinambacan District, Calbayog, Western Samar"	Hi Best Property Developer Corporation	R-VIII	7.26
San Carlos Ecozone	"Palampas and Punao, San Carlos City, Negros Occidental"	"San Julio Reality, Inc."	R-VII	25.79
Sarangani Agro-Industrial Eco Zone	"Municipality of Alabel, Province of Sarangani"	Alsons Development & Investment Corporation	R-XII	317.24
Sarangani Economic Development Zone	"Cannery, Polomolok, South Cotabato"	Sarangani Resources Corporation	R-XII	72.87
SRC Allah Valley Economic Development Zone	"Tubi-allah, Surallah, South Cotabato"	Sarangani Resources Corporation	R-XII	56.1
SRC Calumpang Economic Development Zone	"Calumpang, General Santos"	Sarangani Resources Corporation	R-XII	18.67
Valencia Special Economic Zone	"Barangay Palinpinon, Municipality of Valencia, Province of Negros Oriental"	"Municipal Government of Valencia, Negros Oriental"	R-VII	4.33

Freeports or Special Economic Zones in the Philippines
Economic Zone	Address	Location
Aurora Pacific Economic Zone	Casiguran, Aurora	Luzon
Cagayan Special Economic Zone	Lal-lo, Cagayan	Luzon
Freeport Area of Bataan	Mariveles, Bataan	Luzon
Cavite Economic Zone	Rosario and General Trias, Cavite	Luzon
Clark Freeport Zone	Angeles City and Mabalacat, Pampanga	Luzon
Subic Bay Freeport Zone	Olongapo and Subic, Zambales	Luzon
Poro Point Freeport Zone	La Union	Luzon
Baguio City Economic Zone	Baguio	Luzon

=== Saudi Arabia ===
- Jazan Economic City
- King Abdullah Economic City
- Prince Abdulaziz Bin Mousaed Economic City

=== Tajikistan ===
- Panj Free Economic Zone
- Sughd Free Economic Zone

=== Thailand ===
- Bangkok Free Trade Zone

=== United Arab Emirates ===
==== Abu Dhabi ====
- Khalifa Port Free Trade Zone

==== Dubai ====
- Dubai Multi Commodities Centre
- Dubai Airport Freezone
- Dubai Internet City
- Dubai Knowledge Village
- Dubai Media City
- Dubai Silicon Oasis
- International Media Production Zone
- Jebel Ali Free Zone

==== Ajman ====
- Ajman Free Zone

==== Fujairah ====
- Creative City

==== Umm Al Quwain ====
- Umm Al Quwain Free Trade Zone (UAQFTZ)

==== Ras Al Khaimah ====
- Ras Al Khaimah Economic Zone

=== Yemen ===
- Aden

== Europe ==
=== Belarus ===
- Brest FEZ
- China-Belarus Industrial Park
- Grodno FEZ
- Mogilev Free Enterprise Zone
- FEZ Gomel-Raton

=== Croatia ===
Land free zone:

- Krapina–Zagorje Free Zone (in liquidation)
- Danube Free Zone of Vukovar
- Free Zone of Kukuljanovo (inactive)
- Free Zone of Port of Rijeka – Škrljevo
- Free Zone of Split–Dalmatia (in liquidation)
- Free Zone of Zagreb

Port free zone:

- Free Zone of Port of Ploče
- Free Zone of Port of Pula
- Free Zone of Port of Rijeka
- Free Zone of Port of Split

=== Ireland ===
- Shannon Free Zone

=== Italy ===
- Porto Franco di Trieste
- Porto Franco di Venezia (Venice)
- Livigno
- Campione d'Italia (Until 1 January 2020)

=== Turkey ===
- Mersin Free Zone (1987), MESBAS
- Antalya Free Zone (1987), ASBAS
- Aegean Free Zone (1990), ESBAS
- Istanbul Specialized Free Zone (1990), ISBI
- Trabzon Free Zone (1992), TRANSBAS
- Istanbul Industry and Trade Free Zone (1995), DESBAS
- Izmir Menemen Free Zone (1998), IZBAS
- Rize Free Zone (1998) RIZBAS
- Samsun Free Zone (1998) SASBAS
- Istanbul Trakya Free Zone (1998) ISBAS
- Kayseri Free Zone (1998) KAYSER
- Adana Yumurtalik Free Zone (1998) TAYSEB
- Avrupa Free Zone (1999) ASB
- Gaziantep Free Zone (1999) GASBAS
- Bursa Free Zone (2001) BUSEB
- Denizli Free Zone (2002) DENSER
- Kocaeli Free Zone (2001) KOSBAS
- TUBITAK-MAM Technology Free Zone (2002) MARTEK
- West Anatolia Free Zone (2022) BASBAS

=== Latvia ===
- Liepāja Special Economic Zone

=== Lithuania ===
- Akmenė Free Economic Zone
- Kaunas Free Economic Zone
- Klaipėda Free Economic Zone
- Kėdainiai Free Economic Zone
- Marijampolė Free Economic Zone
- Panevėžys Free Economic Zone
- Šiauliai Free Economic Zone

=== Moldova ===
Moldova has seven Free Trade Zones, called in the national legislation Free Economic Areas.

- FEA “Expo-Business-Chişinău”
- FEA “Bălţi”
- FEA PP “Valkaneş”
- FEA “Ungheni-Business”
- FEA “Tvardiţa”
- FEA PP “Otaci-Business”
- FEA PP “Taraclia”

=== Poland ===
- Special Economic Zone EURO-PARK MIELEC
- Wałbrzych Special Economic Zone "INVEST-PARK"

=== Romania ===
- Constanta South Free Zone
- Basarabi Free Zone
- Giurgiu Free Zone
- Arad-Curtici Free Zone
- Sulina Free Zone
- Galati Free Zone
- Braila Free Zone

=== Georgia ===
- Kutaisi Free Industrial Zone
- Poti Free Industrial Zone

== See also ==
- List of free economic zones
- List of special economic zones
