= CEPZ =

CEPZ may refer to:

- Cavite Export Processing Zone, an export processing zone in Cavite, Philippines
- Chenzhou Export Processing Zone, an export processing zone in Hunan, China
- Chittagong Export Processing Zone, an export processing zone in Chittagong, Bangladesh
