= Sitracima =

Sitracima is the first union to form in the maquila sector in Guatemala. The union was organized in 2001 by women working at the CimaTextiles factory, and concluded negotiations for a collective bargaining agreement with management in 2003.

== Conditions deteriorate ==
Conditions for the union have deteriorated, according to the women. While the women have faced intimidation since they first began organizing the union, they allege that threats have increased. The workers could not work from May 21 to May 26 because of a mandatory "vacation." As of May 30, the workers have nothing to do because management shifted all of the Cimatextiles production to the next-door ChoiShin factory (owned by the same Korean, company, Modas Choi & Shin).

== Student Response ==
On 17 May 2007 union leaders sent out an urgent plea for help to its internationalist allies, including Angelina Godoy, professor at the University of Washington. Dr. Godoy has led a human rights seminar to Guatemala each summer since 2005, and will lead another one in 2007. Each year, she and her students meet with the women of Sitracima, and discuss the nature of their struggle. The students, inspired by the clarity of the plea for help from people with whom they have a personal relationship, are currently organizing to pressure the Guatemalan government to enforce its labor law, to pressure the brands to defend their workers' rights, and to pressure the US government to intervene on the workers' behalf. They are regularly updating a blog with information directly from the workers, and about their actions on the workers' behalf, at https://maquilaemergency.blogspot.com/.

Another student group devoted to labor conditions and workers' rights, Student Labor Action Project, has created an online action page that allows visitors to its website to email representatives of Liz Claiborne, Macy's and Talbot's.
