= Mongla =

Mongla may refer to:

- Mong La town in Shan State, Burma
- Mong La Township
- Mongla Upazila, in Khulna Division, Bangladesh
  - Mongla Export Processing Zone, an economic zone in Bangladesh
- Port of Mongla in Bangladesh
