= Abul Kalam Mohammad Ziaur Rahman =

Major General of the Bangladesh Army

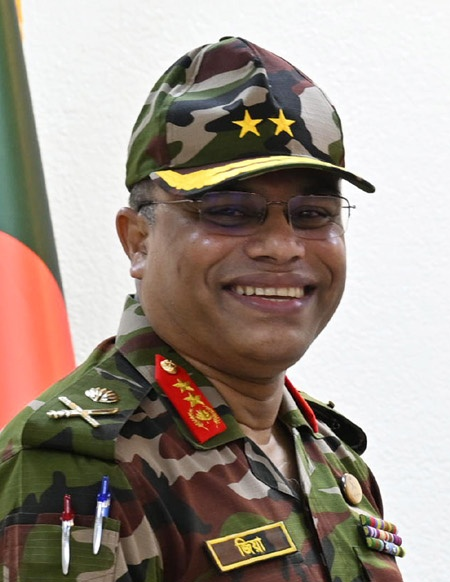
- Abul Kalam Mohammad Ziaur Rahman in 2025
- Education: Bangladesh Military Academy
- Military career
- Allegiance: Bangladesh
- Branch: Bangladesh Army
- Service years: 1989 – 2025
- Rank: Major General
- Service number: BA - 3572
- Unit: Regiment of Artillery
- Commands: Chairman of Bangladesh Export Processing Zone Authority; GOC of 7th Infantry Division; Director of Defence Services Command and Staff College; Commander of 9th Artillery Brigade; Commander of 66th Artillery Brigade

Abul Kalam Mohammad Ziaur Rahman is a retired major general of the Bangladesh Army and he served as the executive chairman of the Bangladesh Export Processing Zones Authority (BEPZA). Prior to joining BEPZA, he was GOC of the 7th Infantry Division and commander of Barishal Area. He is a former defence advisor of the Bangladesh High Commission to India.

== Career ==
Rahman was the commander of 9 Artillery Brigade in Savar Cantonment while he was a brigadier general. He served for the 'United Nations' twice. Once in Haiti and another in Sudan.

Rahman was posted at the Defence Services Command and Staff College as the directing staff. He taught at the Bangladesh Military Academy.

Later, Rahman was appointed the defence advisor of the Bangladesh High Commission to India on 29 May 2017 replacing Brigadier general Md Abdul Hamid.

Rahman commanded the 7th Infantry Division. On 7 November 2021, Rahman was appointed chairman of Bangladesh Export Processing Zones Authority. He replaced Major General Md Nazrul Islam. In December 2021, Rahman inaugurated hostels for women in Mongla Export Processing Zone.

Rahman signed an agreement for the establishment of Big Dipper Textile Mills Limited, a Canadian-Chinese company, factory in Ishwardi Export Processing Zone worth US$91 million in 2022. He saw the signing of an investment agreement with M/s Nova Intima Limited, British Virgin Islands-Hong Kong based company, to establish a factory worth US$28 million.
