= Mohammad Moazzem Hossain (general) =

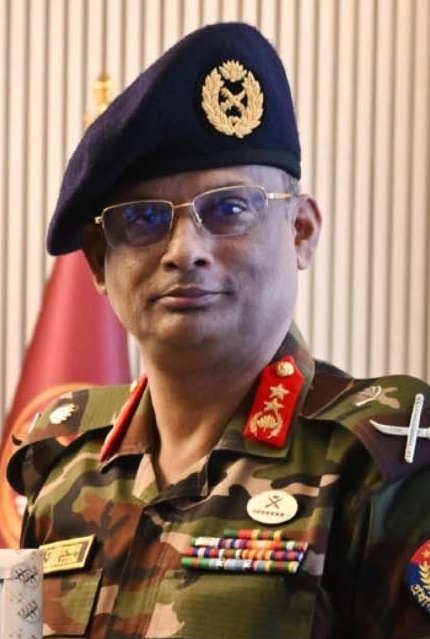
- Military career
- Allegiance: Bangladesh
- Branch: Bangladesh Army
- Service years: 1992-present
- Rank: Major General
- Unit: Regiment of Artillery
- Commands: Executive Chairman of Bangladesh Export Processing Zone Authority; GOC of 7th Infantry Division; Commander of 33rd Artillery Brigade; Commander of 11th Artillery Brigade

Mohammad Moazzem Hossain is a Bangladeshi two-star general who is currently serving as the chairman of the Bangladesh Export Processing Zone Authority (BEPZA).

== Education ==
He is a graduate of the Defence Services Command and Staff College in Mirpur, and completed both the National Defence Course and the Armed Forces War Course from the National Defence College.

== Military career ==
Hossain was commissioned in the Regiment of Artillery of the Bangladesh Army on 20 December 1992. He has commanded two artillery brigades and two artillery regiments.

Prior to becoming executive chairman of BEPZA, he served as GOC of the 7th Infantry Division in Barisal.
