= Adamjee Export Processing Zone =

Industrial park in Bangladesh

Coordinates: 23.6778°N 90.5238°E

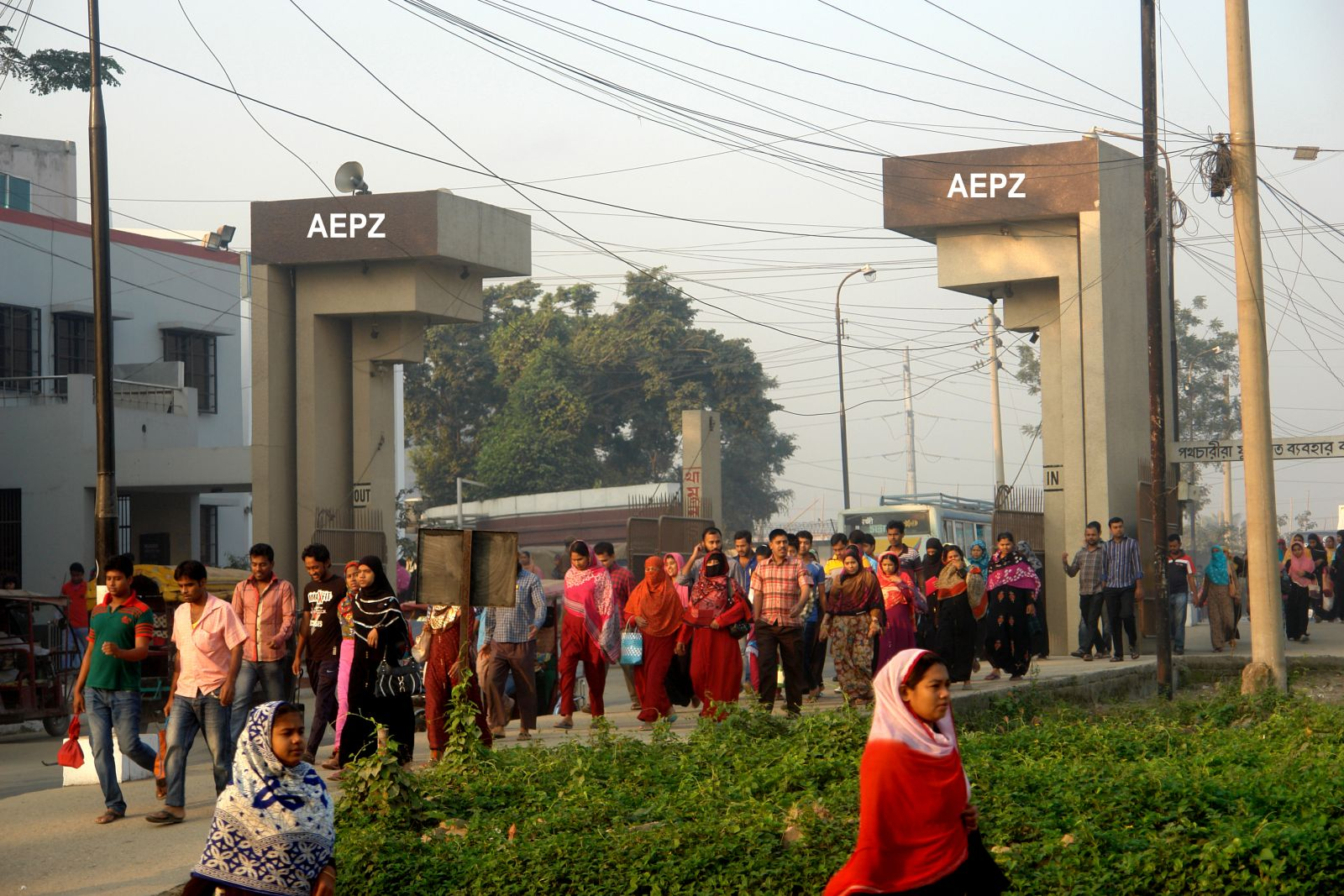
- Adamjee EPZ entrance
- Company type: Special Economic Zone
- Industry: Export-oriented industrial zone
- Founded: 2006; 20 years ago
- Founder: Government of Bangladesh
- Headquarters: Siddhirganj, Narayanganj, Bangladesh
- Products: Various export-oriented products
- Revenue: $2,251,190,000 (as of 2016)
- Parent: Bangladesh Export Processing Zone Authority

Adamjee Export Processing Zone (Bengali: আদমজী রপ্তানি প্রক্রিয়াকরণ অঞ্চল), also known as Narayanganj EPZ, is a special economic zone for producing export-oriented products, located in the industrial city of Siddhirganj, Bangladesh. Established in 2006, it spans 245 acres and houses 229 industrial establishments. It is the 6th-largest special economic zone in Bangladesh. It is, at present led by the incumbent Executive Director, K. M. Mahbub-e-Sobhani.

== Location ==
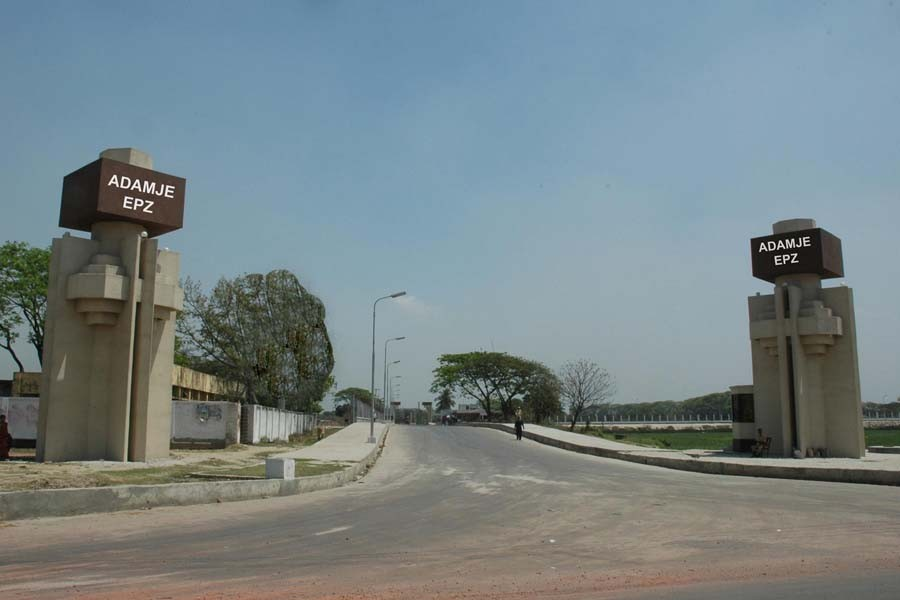
Adamjee Export Processing Zone, also known as Narayanganj EPZ

Adamjee EPZ is located in Adamjinagar, Siddhirganj, approximately 15 km from Dhaka, the capital city. It is 27 km from Hazrat Shahjalal International Airport and 255 km from the Port of Chittagong.

== Facility and utility service ==
It is a fully duty-free zone designed for production and export-oriented activities. The Adamjee Export Processing Zone offers various facilities and utilities, including:

- Water Supply: Treated water from a treatment plant
- Gas Supply: Provided by Titas Gas Transmission & Distribution Company Ltd.
- Power Supply: Tariff power supply from an own substation with an 11 kV capacity

== Investment and export ==
As of December 2016, the total investment in Adamjee EPZ was $397 million and the total export value was $2,251,190,000.
