= Maquila Decree =

The Maquila Decree, established in 1989, lays out the legal requirements for foreign operations in Mexico. As described by the Bancomext Mexican Showroom, an organization to promote foreign investment in Mexico, this program allows foreign companies to build and operate factories in virtually any Mexican location of their choosing. These companies are allowed to import materials and equipment duty-free, the only limitation being that these items will at some unspecified date be removed from Mexico. For these reasons, items manufactured in Mexico are generally exported.

As for the items being manufactured, there are virtually no restrictions other than obtaining a special permit if the product involves radioactive material or firearms. The limitations are so lax that even activities such as data processing are allowed, and not necessarily in conjunction with other manufacturing activities. Furthermore, income and property taxes payable to the Mexican Federal Government are minimal. Some of the maquiladores pollute the Rio Grande.
