= Siddhirganj =

- City
- Location in Bangladesh Siddhirganj (Bangladesh)
- Coordinates: 23°41′N 90°31′E
- Country: Bangladesh
- Division: Dhaka Division
- District: Narayanganj District

Government
  - Type: Narayanganj City Corporation

Area
  - Total: 22.71 km^{2} (8.77 sq mi)

Population
  - Total: 256,760
  - Density: 11,310/km^{2} (29,280/sq mi)
- Postal code: 1430

Siddhirganj, is one of the oldest industrial cities of Bangladesh. It is located on the bank of Shitalakshya River, in Narayanganj District. The Siddhirganj Industrial Zone has more than 15,000 factories and industrial establishments. Adamjee Jute Mills was established in Siddhirganj in 1951 and was once the largest jute mill in the world. This city is also one of the largest exporter in the country. In 2018–2019, the Adamjee export processing zone in Siddhirganj exported more than 4 billion US dollars' worth of goods.

== History ==
Siddhirganj is famous due to its favorable geographic location and it's proximity to Narayanganj, one of the largest port cities in the Bengal region. Siddhirganj specialized in muslin production from hand looms. As a gateway to Dhaka, Narayanganj's economic activities were greatly contributed by Siddhirganj. The traditional art of weaving Jamdani muslin in Bangladesh was included in the list of Masterpieces of the Oral and Intangible Heritage of Humanity by UNESCO.

== Power station ==
Siddhirganj has four power stations total and manufacturing more than 400 MW in electricity generation capacity. A new power station called the Siddhirganj Peaking Power Project is set to be completed by 30 June 2018 after 10 years of construction at a total cost of $470 million.
