= Barisal Cantonment =

Bangladeshi military cantonment

Coordinates: 22.473°N 90.335°E

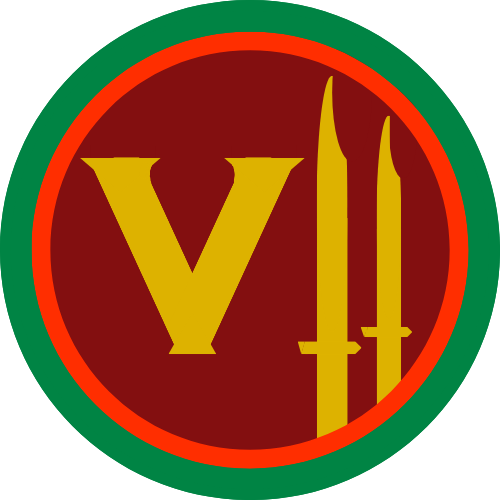
Barisal Cantonment
- বরিশাল সেনানিবাস
- Bakerganj, Barisal Division, Bangladesh

Site information
- Type: Cantonment
- Controlled by: Bangladesh Army

Garrison information
- Current commander: Major General Abu Hena Mohammad Razi Hasan

Barisal Cantonment is the headquarters of the 7th Infantry Division of the Bangladesh Army. It is located in Lebukhali, Bakerganj sub-district, in Barisal. The area of the cantonment is 1,532 acres (620 ha). The project was completed by the Ministry of Defence by June 2021.

== History ==
The "Sheikh Hasina Cantonment" was planned to be established as part of the government's long-term modernization scheme for the Bangladesh Armed Forces called "Forces Goal 2030".

under the then Prime Minister Sheikh Hasina's approval, the project in 2014 began its journey which she first announced during a winter exercise of the Bangladesh Armed Forces on January 16, 2015.

The executive committee of the National Economic Council approved the project "Establishment of Sheikh Hasina Cantonment, Barishal" on November 14, 2017. The set up of this cantonment will cost approximately Tk 1,699 crore.

On February 8, 2018, Prime Minister Sheikh Hasina inaugurated the cantonment. After the fall of Prime Minister Sheikh Hasina's regime due to the July Uprising in 2024, the cantonment was renamed to "Barisal Cantonment".

== See also ==
- List of formations of the Bangladesh Army
