= Karnaphuli Export Processing Zone =

Coordinates: 22.2752°N 91.7920°E

Karnaphuli Export Processing Zone is an export processing zone in Bangladesh located at the city of Chittagong. It was established in September 2006 on about 222.42 acres of lands in North Patenga and Halishahar area in the city.

== See also ==
- Bangladesh Export Processing Zone Authority
- Uttara Export Processing Zone
