= Dhaka Export Processing Zone =

Industrial park in Savar, Bangladesh

- Native name: ঢাকা রপ্তানি প্রক্রিয়াকরণ অঞ্চল
- Industry: Export Processing
- Founded: 1993; 33 years ago
- Founder: Government of Bangladesh
- Headquarters: Ashulia, Savar, Dhaka, Bangladesh
- Products: Ready-made Garments, Toys, Sweaters, Blankets
- Revenue: $1,780.73 million (2012-2013)
- Parent: Bangladesh Export Processing Zone Authority (BEPZA)
- Website: Official Website

Dhaka Export Processing Zone (Bengali: ঢাকা রপ্তানি প্রক্রিয়াকরণ অঞ্চল, abbreviated as Dhaka EPZ, DEPZ, or Savar EPZ) is an export processing zone in Bangladesh. It is located in the Ashulia area of Savar Upazila, near the capital Dhaka. The zone was established in 1993, and in 1997, an expanded area was added. Covering 356.22 acres, it is the second-largest export processing zone in Bangladesh.

== Location ==
The Dhaka EPZ is situated 35 kilometers from the capital Dhaka in the Savar Upazila of Ashulia at Gonokbari, Savar. It is located 25 kilometers from Hazrat Shahjalal International Airport, and 304 kilometers from Chittagong Sea Port.

== Facilities ==
The zone operates as a duty-free area where raw materials can be imported and tax-free export of finished products. The zone is equipped with its own water supply system, power plant, and an 11kV substation under the management of BEPZA. Titas Gas provides natural gas as fuel for the factories in the zone.

== Industrial establishments ==
There are three types of investments in the industries located within the Dhaka EPZ:

1. 100% foreign investment
2. Joint investment between foreign and local capital
3. 100% local investment

The zone contains a total of 451 industrial plots.

== Products manufactured ==
The main products manufactured in the Dhaka EPZ include:

- Ready-made garments
- Toys
- Sweaters
- Blankets

== Exports ==
In the 2012-2013 fiscal year, a total of US$4,856.68 million worth of products were exported from all EPZs, accounting for about 18% of the national exports. Of this, the Dhaka EPZ exported goods worth US$1,780.73 million. In the 2013-2014 fiscal year, EPZs collectively exported products worth US$5,525.30 million, with Dhaka EPZ contributing US$1,780.72 million. Over the past six years, BEPZA has achieved a 129.55% growth in investment, 155.95% growth in exports, and 112.30% growth in employment.

== See also ==
- Bangladesh Export Processing Zone Authority
