= Anzali Free Trade-Industrial Zone =

Anzali Free Trade–Industrial Zone
- Founded: 2005
- Owner: Anzali Free Trade–Industrial Zone Organization
- Website: www.anzalifz.ir

The Anzali Free Trade–Industrial Zone is one of the 18 free trade zones in Iran., located in Gilan province, Iran. It was established in 2005 in Bandar-e Anzali County as part of the country's economic development objectives.

The Anzali Free Trade–Industrial Zone is located in northern Iran, along the southern coast of the Caspian Sea, and lies on the route of the North–South Transport Corridor.

As part of the country's economic development objectives, following a visit by the then president to Bandar-e Anzali and in response to public demand, the Iranian Cabinet approved the establishment of the Bandar-e Anzali Special Economic Zone in 1996. The zone was designated in two separate sections. In 2003, the Anzali Special Economic Zone was converted into the Anzali Free Trade–Industrial Zone. In 2004, the bylaws of the Anzali Free Trade–Industrial Zone Organization were approved by the Cabinet. In 2005, the Cabinet defined and officially announced the boundaries of the free zone.

Under this designation, the Anzali Free Trade–Industrial Zone comprised three separate areas: the port area administered by the provincial Ports and Shipping Department, the Anzali Industrial Estate, and the area of the former Anzali Special Economic Zone. The zone covered 3,200 hectares of land and extended up to 2 kilometres into the sea along a 20-kilometre stretch of the Caspian Sea coast.
