= Benjamin William Mkapa Special Economic Zone =

The Benjamin William Mkapa Special Economic Zone (BWM- SEZ) is a Special Economic Zone at Mabibo in Dar es Salaam, Tanzania.

It is the Government's initiative of enabling the country to attain semi-industrialization status. It is under the 2020 Mini-Tiger plan which aims to create economic growth at a comparable rate to the Asian Tigers.
