= Hardware Park, Hyderabad =

Special Economic Zone in Hyderabad, India

Hardware Park is a Special Economic Zone located at Shamshabad in Hyderabad. The Industries in Hardware Park include Tata Teleservices, Centre for Development of Advanced Computing (C-DAC), HCL TalentCare Pvt Ltd, Zen Technologies, Sigma Microsystems Pvt Ltd etc. It is promoted by TSIIC. It has an area of 690 hectares (1,700 acres).
