= Bangkok Free Trade Zone =

Bangkok Free Trade Zone (BFTZ) is an industrial park located near Bangkok, Thailand. It covers about 400 acres (160 ha) and is managed by Prospect Development Company.

In 2013, Ticon Logistics Park agreed to purchase 71 acres (29 ha) acres in the BFTZ where it planned to build 150,000 square metres (1,600,000 sq ft) of warehouses. The company chose the area because it "is close to Bangkok and situated in the vicinity of major roads with transportation linkages that facilitate efficient logistics management between Bangkok and other provinces in all regions."

As of 2008, the Thai motorcycle manufacturer Toyotron produced its Hunter electric motorcycles in the BFTZ.
