= Al-Mazyunah Free Zone =

Coordinates: 17.8228°N 52.6125°E

Almazunah Free Zone
- The Logo of Almazunah Free Zone
- Abbreviation: MFZ
- Type: Free Economic Zone
- Location: Sultanate of Oman
- Key people: Mohammad Rafeet, Said Al Mashani, Hilal AL Hsany
- Website: www.mfz.om

Al-Mazyunah Free Zone (Arabic: المنطقة الحرة بالمزيونة) is a free trade zone in Oman.

== History ==
Al-Mazunah Free Zone was established in 1999 in the Dhofar region in Walayat Al-Mazyunah, in southwestern Oman near the border with Yemen. By the Royal Decree 103/2005 it was given all the characteristics of a Free Zone and its management assigned to the Public Establishment for Industrial Estates - Madayn, the main government arm responsible for developing and managing prime industrial lands in Oman. Many Exemptions and facilities are offered for businesses operating in the free zone. Almazunah Free Zone occupies area around 4.5 million square meters. In 2010 a long-term investment agreement has been entered between the Public Establishment for Industrial Estates and Golden Hala Company to develop and operate an area of 3 million square meters.
