= Chittagong Export Processing Zone =

Export processing zone in Bangladesh

Coordinates: 22.2906°N 91.7758°E

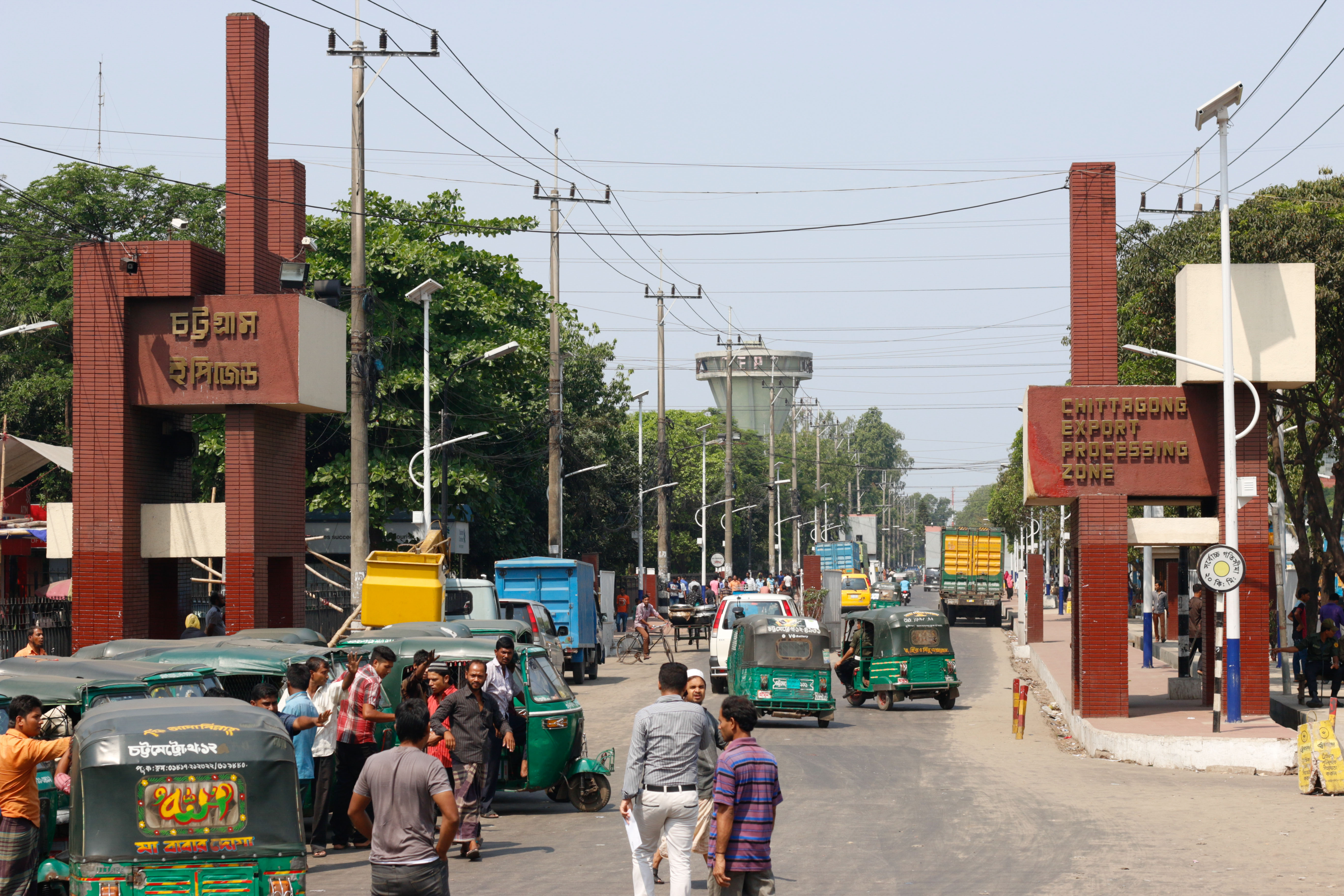
- Entrance of Chittagong EPZ
- Native name: চট্টগ্রাম রপ্তানি প্রক্রিয়াকরণ অঞ্চল
- Company type: Export Processing Zone
- Industry: Export Processing
- Founded: 1983; 43 years ago
- Founder: Bangladesh Export Processing Zone Authority (BEPZA)
- Headquarters: Chattogram, Bangladesh
- Area served: Global
- Key people: BEPZA Chairman
- Products: Industrial plots, factory spaces
- Revenue: US$40.5 billion (cumulative exports up to 2022–23)
- Owner: Government of Bangladesh
- Parent: Bangladesh Export Processing Zones Authority

The Chittagong Export Processing Zone (CEPZ) (Bengali: চট্টগ্রাম রপ্তানি প্রক্রিয়াকরণ অঞ্চল), also known as Chattogram EPZ, is the first and one of the eight export processing zones in Bangladesh. Established in 1983, it is located in South Halishahar, Chattogram. In 2010, CEPZ was ranked third globally in cost competitiveness and fourth in economic potential in a survey of the world's 700 economic zones by FDi magazine. As of 2022–23, CEPZ has received cumulative investment of US$2.04 billion and generated cumulative exports of US$40.5 billion.

== Achievement ==
Ranked third in cost competitiveness and fourth in economic potential by fDi magazine in 2010

== Facilities ==
Chittagong Export Processing Zone has been established on an area of 453 acres with 501 industrial plots having average plot size of about 2000 sq.m. The zone has water supply by a service oriented treatment plan of Chattogram WASA, gas supply by Karnaphuli Gas Distribution Company Limited and power supply from a service oriented power plant run by PDB through own sub-station. The current tariff for renting per sq.m. of plot in this EPZ is US$2.50.

== Gallery ==
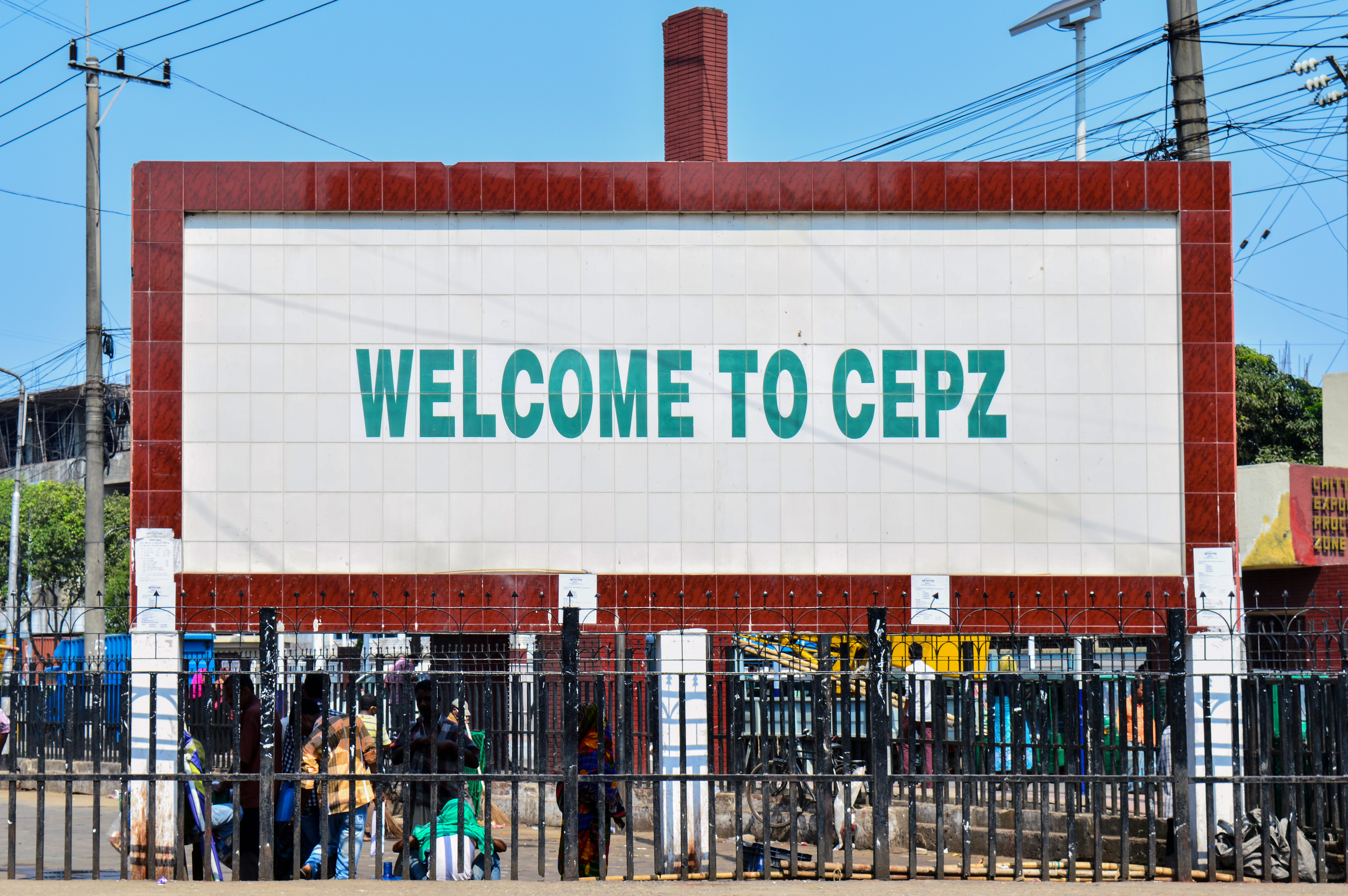

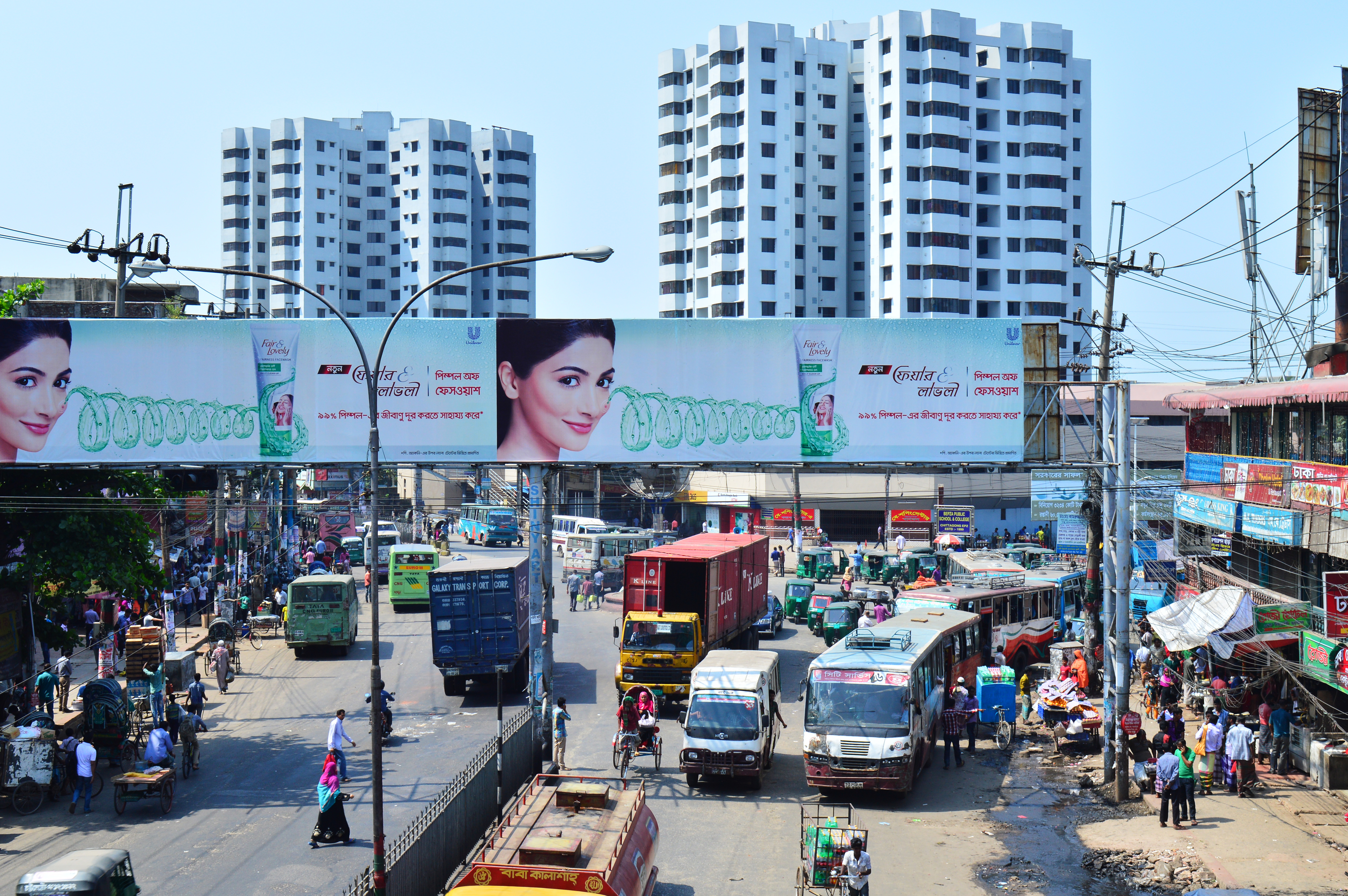
Freeport circle

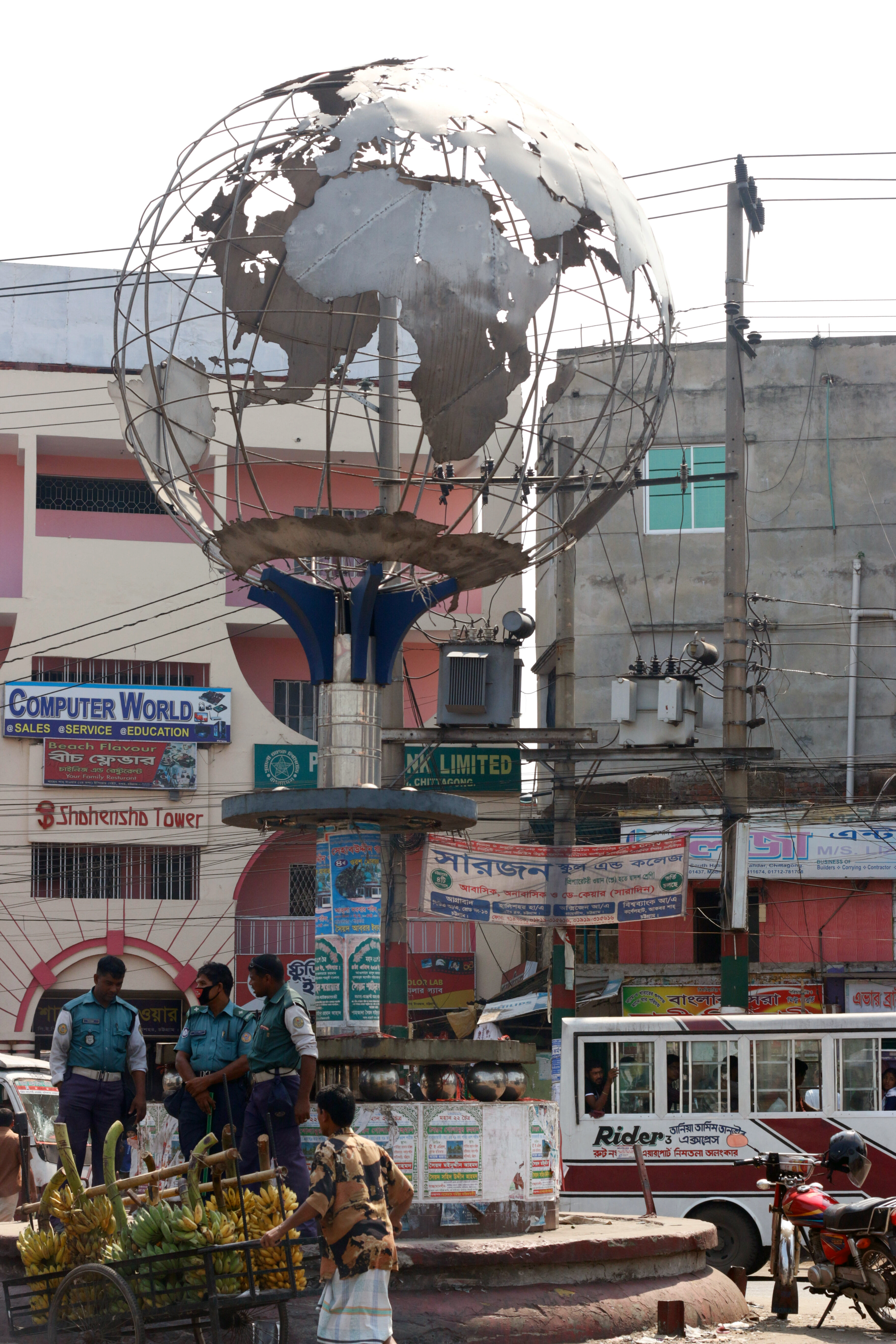
CEPZ circle

== See also ==
- Bangladesh Export Processing Zone Authority
- Uttara Export Processing Zone
