= Maquiladora =

Tariff-free factory in Latin America

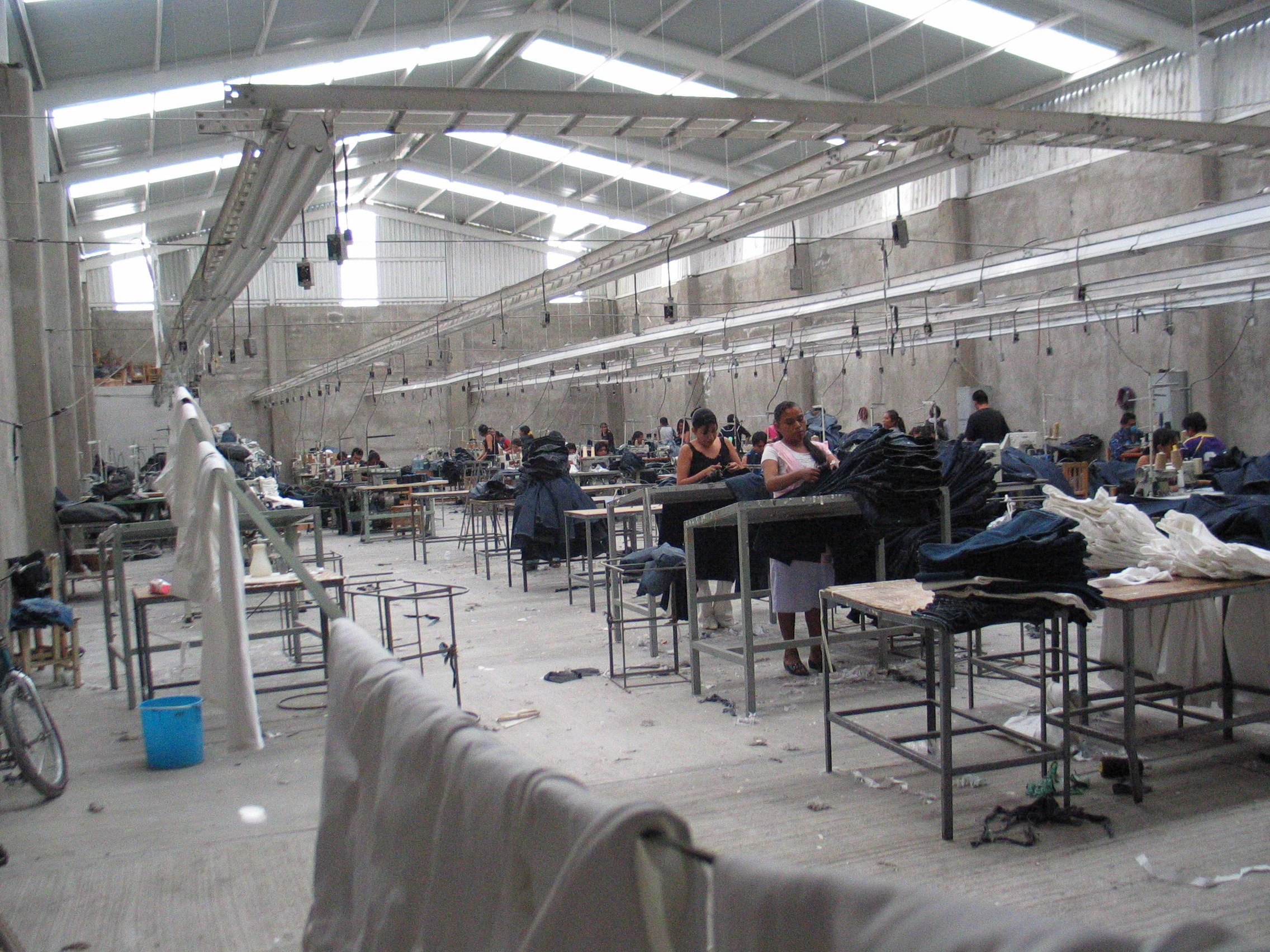
A maquila in Mexico

A maquiladora (Spanish: [makilaˈðoɾa]), or maquila (IPA: [maˈkila]) is a factory that is largely duty-free and tariff-free. These factories take raw materials, assemble, manufacture, or process them, (Note: The Spanish-language verb maquilar means "to assemble".) then export the finished product. Such factories and systems operate throughout Latin America, including in Mexico, Paraguay, Nicaragua, and El Salvador. Maquiladoras date back to 1964, when the Mexican government introduced the Programa de Industrialización Fronteriza ('Border Industrialization Program'). Specific programs and laws have allowed Mexico's maquila industry to grow rapidly.

== History ==
From 1942 to 1964, the Bracero program allowed men with farming experience to work on U.S. farms on a seasonal basis, and its end ushered in a new era for the development of Mexico. The Border Industrialization Program (BIP) began in 1965 and allowed for a lowering in restrictions and duties on machinery, equipment and raw materials. Before this program, PRONAF, a national border program for infrastructure developments like building roads, parks, electricity, water, building factories, and cleaning up border cities, helped to improve situations along the U.S.–Mexico Border. With BIP, foreign firms were able to use factories built under PRONAF to import raw materials and export goods for a cheaper cost than in other countries. One of the main goals of the Border Industrialization Program was to attract foreign investment.

In 1989, the Mexican federal government put in place specific procedures and requirements for maquilas under the "Decree for Development and Operation of the Maquiladora Industry". Following a debt crisis in 1980, the Mexican economy liberalized and foreign investment increased. Factory jobs began to leave central Mexico, and workers followed the jobs from central Mexico to the maquilas in the north and on the border. In 1985, maquiladoras overtook tourism as the largest source of foreign exchange, and since 1996, they have been the second largest industry in Mexico behind the petroleum industry.

=== NAFTA ===
With the introduction of NAFTA in 1994, Northern Mexico became an export processing zone. This allowed multinational corporations from the U.S. to produce products cheaply. Corporations could use a maquila to import materials and produce a good more cheaply than in the U.S. by paying Mexican laborers lower wages and paying less in duties. Mexicans work for approximately one-sixth of the U.S. hourly rate. During the five years before NAFTA, maquila employment had grown at a rate of 47%; this figure increased to 86% in the next five years. The number of factories also increased dramatically. Between 1989 and 1994, 564 new plants opened; in the five years following, 1460 plants opened. However, the maquiladora growth is largely attributable to growth in U.S. demand and devaluation of the peso, not NAFTA itself. In the 1970s, most maquiladoras were located around the Mexico–United States border. By 1994, these were spread in the interior parts of the country, although the majority of the plants were still near the border.

=== The 2000s ===
A 2011 Federal Reserve report indicated that the maquiladora industry affects U.S. border city employment in service sectors. Although the maquiladora industry suffered due to the early 2000s recession, maquiladoras constituted 54% of the U.S.–Mexico trade in 2004, and by 2005, the maquiladora exports accounted for half of Mexico's exports. In the 2000s, the maquila industry faced competition due to rise of other countries with availability of cheap labor, including Malaysia, India, and Pakistan. The biggest threat came from China's Special Economic Areas.

== Growth and development ==
During the later half of the 1960s, maquiladora industries rapidly expanded geographically and economically and, by 1985, had become Mexico's second largest source of income from exports, behind oil. Since 1973, maquiladoras have also accounted for nearly half of Mexico's export assembly. Between 1995 and 2000, exports of assembled products in Mexico tripled, and the rate of the industry's growth amounted to about one new factory per day. By the late twentieth century, the industry accounted for 25 percent of Mexico's gross domestic product, and 17 percent of total Mexican employment.

=== Globalization ===
Since globalization and physical restructuring have contributed to the competition and advent of low-cost offshore assembly in places such as China, and countries in Central America, maquiladoras in Mexico have been on the decline since 2000. According to federal sources, approximately 529 maquiladoras shut down and investment in assembly plants decreased by 8.2 percent in 2002 after the imposition of countervailing duties on Chinese products, not available in North America, that were part of the electronics supply chain. Despite the decline, over 3,000 maquiladoras still exist along the 2,000-mile-long United States–Mexico border, providing employment for approximately one million workers, and importing more than $51 billion in supplies into Mexico. Research indicates that maquiladoras' post-NAFTA growth is connected to changes in Mexican wages relative to those in Asia and in the United States, and to fluctuations in U.S. industrial production. As of 2006, maquiladoras still accounted for 45 percent of Mexico's exports. Maquiladoras, in general, are best represented among operations that are particularly assembly intensive.

== Women ==
=== Women enter the labor force and face inequality through different means ===
Women entered the labor force in Mexico in large numbers in the latter half of the 20th century. Devaluations of the peso in 1982 and 1994 pushed many Mexican women into the labor force. Between 1970 and 1995, 18% more women were part of the working force, and many of these women were working in maquila factories. Women looked for work in factories because they could get jobs with few credentials and receive on the job training. Men working in maquilas were given positions of supervision, management, engineers, and technical jobs, while women were relegated to low-skill jobs. Young women tended to be hired more often than older women, but it depended on the circumstances of the job and type of factory. However, young single women often ended up in factories with better working conditions, like the electronics plants, while older women and mothers worked in more dangerous apparel factories.

Gender plays a key role in both disguising and preserving economic frustration in the city of Juárez, Mexico. Given that several women are brutally murdered in Mexico, with Juárez as one of the main city targets, it is essential to look into the orientations of male authority, cheap labor exploitation, and the maquiladoras export processing zone. Oftentimes, young women are murdered as a result of economic frustration, being directed at the maquiladora workers. Working women are viewed by the maquiladora system as "cheap labor" and easily replaceable, which makes it easy and acceptable to kill these women without consequences. In order to examine the relationship between gender and production, gender and violence, this article focuses on situating the killings of these women within their social and ideological contexts. In this piece, the reasons for these women's treatment and the social justifications for it are examined.

Poverty is a key factor that motivates women to work in maquiladoras. The minimum wage set by the Mexican government is barely enough to help sustain a family even with both parents working. The minimum wage "buys only about a quarter of the basic necessities that are essential for a typical worker's family". Maquilas pay at much higher rate than the minimum wage in most markets since there is a lot of competition for the best workers, and workers will not work without transportation and other bonuses. The 2015 minimum wage was 70.1 pesos per day in Tijuana (minimum wages vary by zone and worker classification) or about $0.55 per hour at the 2016 exchange rate of 16 pesos per dollar, while most entry-level positions in maquilas paid closer to $2 per hour including bonuses and 25% being paid to Social Security, housing, and retirement. Even in maquila factories, wages are still very low and in many families the children are encouraged to start working at an early age to support the family. In some maquiladoras, workers are cut and their responsibilities are given to a single worker. These workers are not given a higher pay, and are expected to maintain their output without a decrease in quality. They often work involuntary overtimes and are often not paid for their extra labor.

=== Gendered violence in the maquiladora labor force ===
Allegedly, women are not allowed to be pregnant while working. Some maquilas require female workers to take pregnancy tests. Some require that workers resign if they are pregnant. Female applicants are made to take pregnancy tests and are only hired if not pregnant, and women that become pregnant while working at maquila factories are given more strenuous tasks and forced to work unpaid overtime to influence them to resign. Human Rights Watch wrote a report in 1996 about the failures of the government to address this issue despite the fact that pregnancy testing violates Mexican federal labor law. These practices have continued into the 21st century. Once on the job, many women face sexual harassment by supervisors and find no help from human resources.

Due to the cruel and horrific appearances of violence against women in Mexican society, feminists have been working at the community level to end sexual violence against women in Ciudad Juárez, Mexico, many years before the #MeToo movement was even conceived. Sociologists and feminists wonder whether the #MeToo movement has already taken root in Mexico and if so, how? Sociologists and feminists ask themselves questions such as: Has Ciudad Juárez's #MeToo movement made an influence on women's lives there? If so, by how much and why? This article explores the significance of maquiladoras and how the working conditions there have impacted women as well, by allowing the exploitation of women. Finally, the article successfully communicates all of its ideas through a thorough discussion between its authors.

Rita Segato, an Argentine-Brazilian scholar who also identifies as a feminist and has a sociological point of view, makes an effort to make sense of the femicides that occur in Ciudad Juárez. Segato examines the violence, bigotry, and ego with which Mexican men treat their women. These women are typically young ladies who are small, dark skinned, with long hair and work largely in the maquiladora labor force. In comparison to other parts of Mexico, Ciudad Juárez is a risky place for women to live. These Mexican men view these women's bodies as throwaway and erasable objects that they can use anyway they choose. As if that weren't clear, the bodies of women from the Mexican border continue to be consumed by misogyny that has reached the most dreadful level of brutality. Many women are injured in maquilas. Intense work pace and pressure on high production leads to injuries including upper back, neck, and shoulder pain. Many maquilas do not report accidents and workers are not compensated for injuries received on the job. Workplace hazards include toxic chemicals, and workplaces lack health and safety practices like ventilation and face masks. The men in authority severely exploit these women, which makes matters worse.

=== Unionization ===
While labor unions exist in maquiladoras, many are charro unions, which are government-supported and often fail to act in the interest of workers. Official unions discredit maquiladora workers by calling them "agitators". Workers who complain can be fired and blacklisted from other jobs. Many contracts are only for a few months, allowing companies to have a high turnover rate in which workers never have the chance to organize for their rights. Many tried to organize independent unions but often failed. Rita Segato investigates the historical changes associated with war and the essential role that inhumanity obtains in it toward people who do not participate in the conflict, such as women and children. According to Segato, violence against women has stopped being an outcome of war but instead has turned into a strategic goal. Governed by armed corporations with the participation of state and parastate forces, this is where the new forms of conflict take place. Tragically, women and children have become victims of both physical abuse, bodily mutilation, body trafficking and commercialization.

In 1993, the Mexican labor federation, the Authentic Labor Front, and the United Electrical Workers worked together to improve conditions at the General Electric factory, but failed in the loss of an election. The Center for Labor Studies (CETLAC) was opened in the mid-1990s and worked to educate workers about their rights, and activism decreased in light of violence against women. In Juarez, between 1993 and 2005, more than 370 women were murdered. In 2010, more than 370 women were murdered. A new wave of worker protests has emerged in the 21st century as workers decide that enough is enough. In 2015 in Juarez, maquiladora workers set up encampments, plantons, to protest and demand independent unions. Rita Segato argues using a decolonial feminist viewpoint that contends that patriarchal political structures existed in communal societies prior to colonialism. According to Segato, the modern gender system's capture the changes of precolonial dual gender structures which worsen inequality, boosts violence against women, and depoliticizes them. To Segato, precolonial gender differs significantly from colonial-modern societies' gender structures, which operate in terms of a beneficiary and its subordinated others. In this article, Segato focuses on the patriarchal institutions of Ciudad Juárez, Mexico and Brazil's National Indian Foundation (FUNAI) to extensively analyze and characterize these preexisting structures.

The U.S.–Mexico border region is highly stratified by race, class, and gender. According to Segato, the racialization of individuals living south of the border underlies and reinforces prosecution of "illegal aliens", ultimately endangering Mexican women and children. In the city of Juárez, women have been murdered as a result of the maquiladora killings.

=== The Han Young case ===
The Han Young maquiladora was a plant in Tijuana that manufactured car parts for Hyundai. In 1997, what started as a complaint by a single injured worker turned into a yearslong conflict where employees protested for their right to unionize. The struggle put the NAFTA labor side agreement to the test, but despite the workers' efforts, nothing ever came of it. The case became increasingly political and newsworthy as time went on. However, despite various U.S. NAO hearings and transnational labor rights organizing, the workers were never able to unionize. On the contrary, by the end of the conflicts, all of the laborers had been fired and the maquiladora had been moved to the other side of Tijuana. This was in the face of a Mexican federal court ruling that the strikes had been legal and in fact the corporation had violated the law.

== Environmental effects ==
Both the United States and Mexican governments claim to be committed to environmental protection, yet environmental policies have not always been enforced despite the fact that maquilas are required to be certified and to provide an environmental impact statement. In Mexico, most maquiladoras are global players that use international standards for waste treatment and disposal that exceed Mexican requirements and that require any waste generated to be re-exported. The development of large factories led to a substantial output of hazardous waste that disrupted local communities. The La Paz Agreement signed by Mexico and the United States in 1983 requires hazardous waste created by United States corporations to be transported back to the United States for disposal. However, the United States Environmental Protection Agency (EPA) reports that only 91 of the 600 maquiladoras located along the Texas–Mexico border have returned hazardous waste to the United States since 1987. Among others, the United States Geological Survey, the state of California, and the Imperial County Health Department have all asserted that the New River, which flows from Mexicali in Mexico near the American border into California's Salton Sea, is "the dirtiest river in America". The presence of toxic waste in towns near maquila factories has led to negative health outcomes for the people living there. Between 1988 and 1992, 163 children in Juárez were born with anencephaly due to the toxic chemicals from factories, prompting worker activism.

=== Improvement ===
There have been some improvement at the corporate level of environmental policy. As of the early 2000s, around 90% of maquiladoras had attained an environmental certification. This push to improve environmental policy was led by the Mexican government, not the international companies themselves. The EPA's U.S.–Mexico Border 2012 Program has an extensive plan to help with environmental issues along that border.

== Workers' health and safety ==
Maquiladoras have a history of extremely harsh working conditions, often exploiting employees to increase profits. Since most maquiladoras are located in lower socioeconomic areas, the local communities must work in these conditions to survive. These conditions include chemical exposure, poor air quality and ventilation, physical strain, noise exposure, and limited regulation and enforcement of occupational safety standards. With the increase of electronic development in the 1980s and 1990s, there was an increase in diseases caused by exposure to metals, such as lead poisoning and neurological disorders. Employees in maquiladoras often lack proper personal safety equipment such as hard hats, safety glasses and vests, and personal respirators, increasing the risk of exposure to hazards.

The North American Free Trade Agreement (NAFTA) also indirectly caused a surge in the development of maquiladoras, which caused workers to face more frequent exposure to harmful substances without proper enforcement of industrial hygiene standards. This led to several public health campaigns from U.S. and Mexican advocacy groups for better hygiene practices to help protect workers and their families from hazardous exposures. Throughout the 1990s and 2000s, workers suffered from toluene exposure due to its common use in several manufacturing processes, causing symptoms of dizziness, nausea, and other neurological issues. This issue drew public attention and highlighted the risks of inadequate ventilation within maquiladoras and the need for personal protective equipment.

Due to the expansion of U.S. trade and investment in Mexico, the need for maquiladoras grew substantially between 1985 and 1992. This led to large companies in the U.S. shifting labor-intensive manufacturing to Mexico to maintain high profit margins. Although maquiladoras provided jobs for local communities, it soon became apparent that health standards in many factories were not properly regulated, garnering publicity from U.S. and Mexican advocacy groups. Very minimal safety training programs were established, but the long-term risks from exposure to chemical and physical hazards were detrimental to the workers' health and safety.

== See also ==
- Dominican Republic–Central America Free Trade Agreement
- Economy of Mexico
- Free Trade Area of the Americas
- Free trade
- Globalization
- Colonia (Mexico)
- Latin American economy
- List of free-trade zones
- Maquila Decree
