= Panevėžys Free Economic Zone =

Coordinates: 55°44′36″N 24°17′15″E

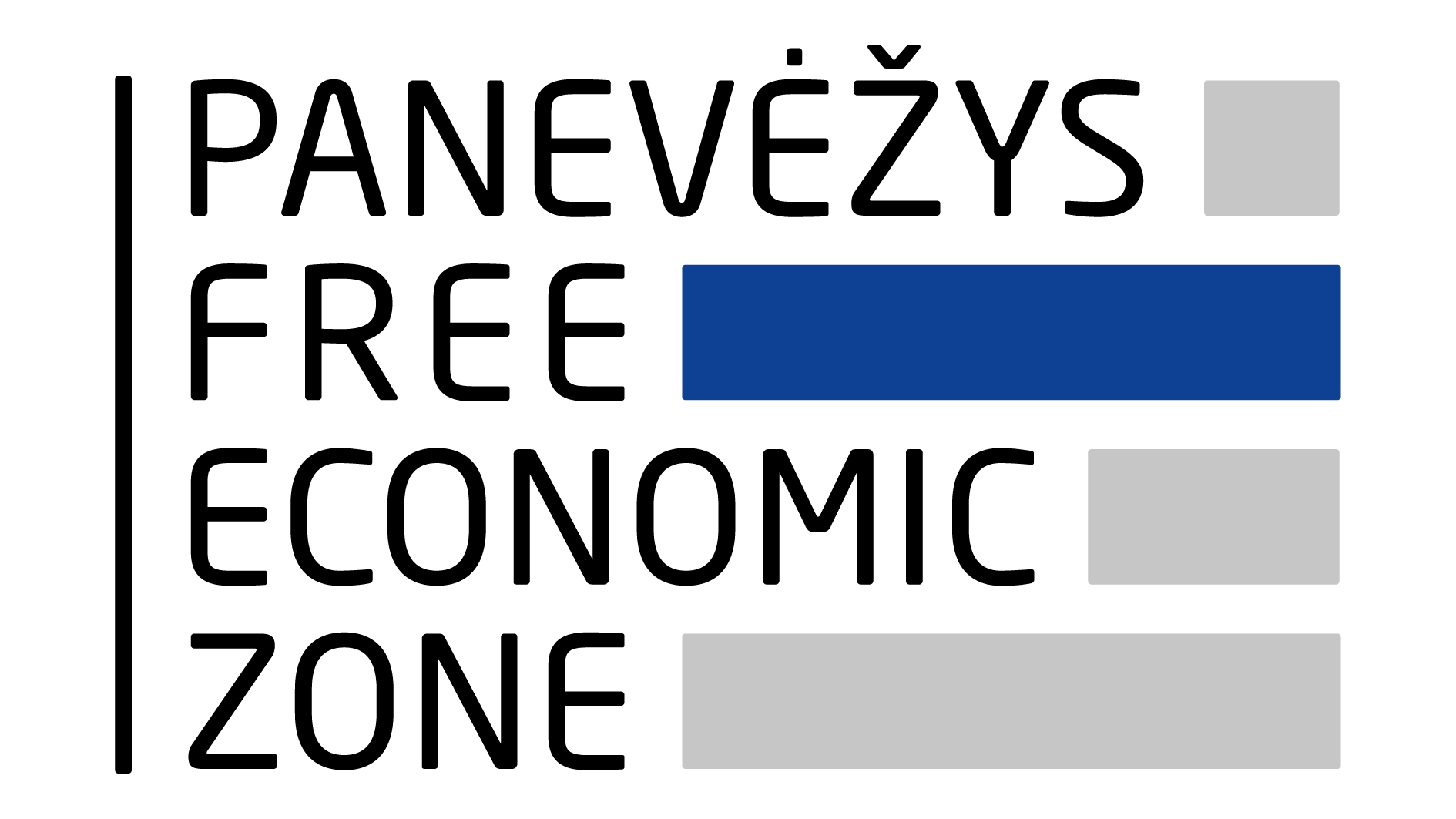
- Company type: UAB
- Industry: Tax free zone. Logistics, warehouse, manufacturing, industry
- Founded: 2013
- Headquarters: Verkių str. 29, LT-09108 Vilnius, Lithuania
- Key people: Rokas Krivonis
- Owner: Panevėžio laisvoji ekonominė zona, UAB
- Website: www.pfez.lt

Panevėžys free economic zone (Lithuanian: Panevėžio laisvoji ekonominė zona) is a special economic zone located in Panevėžys, Lithuania. It is a 47 hectares industrial area and was established in 2013. Panevėžys FEZ is part of Ogmios group, which is a leading real estate developer in Lithuania. It offers industrial, logistics and other companies fast and flexible set-up process, fully ready infrastructure and 0% tax incentives.

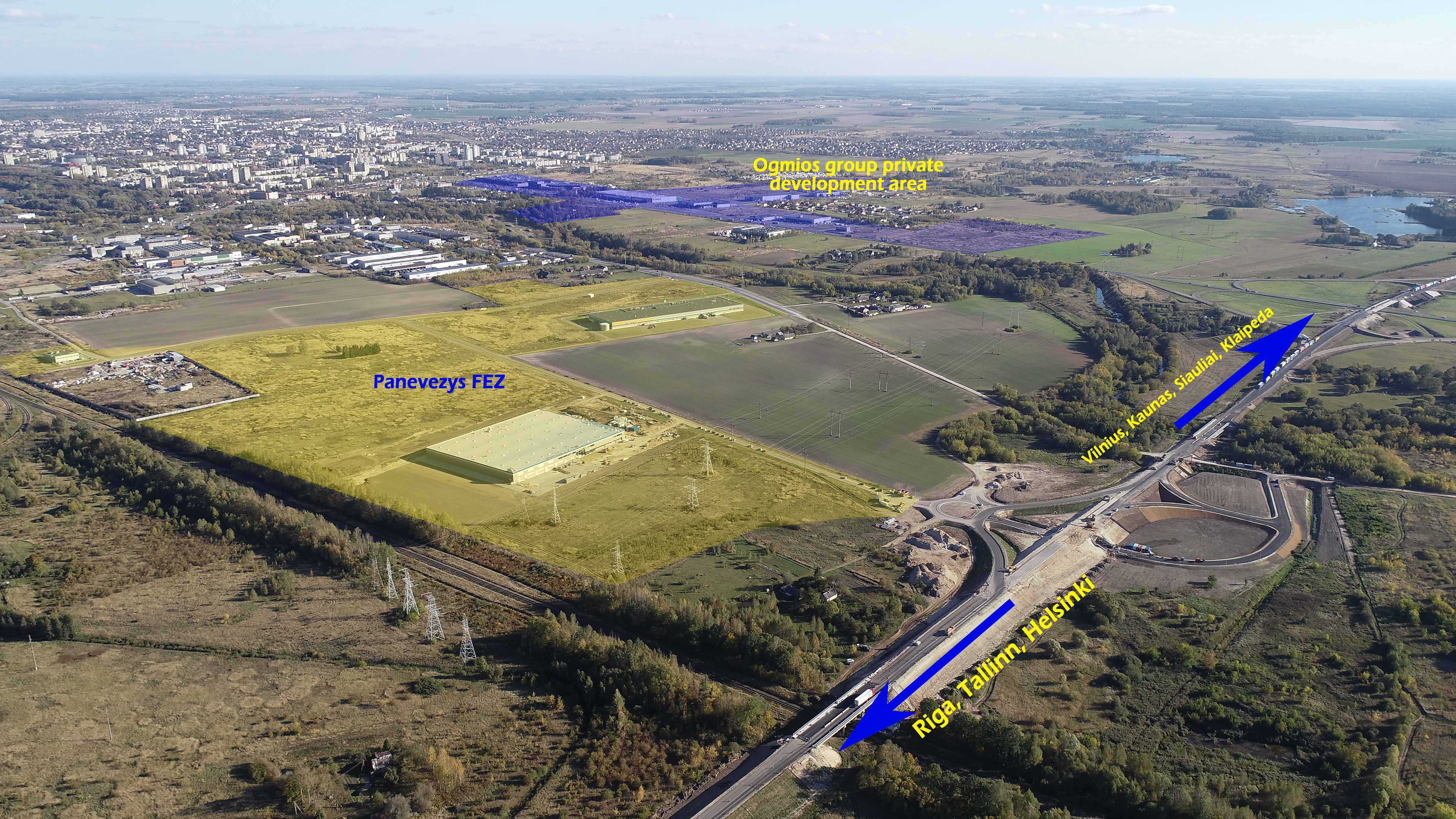
Drone footage of Panevėžys Free Economic Zone industrial park that has direct connection with European Route E67 (Via Baltica).

== Location ==
Panevėžys Free Economic Zone (FEZ) is located halfway between Vilnius and Riga, the port of Klaipėda is 240 kilometers away and Šiauliai International Airport is 160 kilometers away. FEZ has connections with European route E67 and is also located near the Rail Baltica that is planned to be completed around 2024. In 2019 Panevėžys FEZ has finished a direct route connection via roundabout with the European route E67 highway Via Baltica that makes it more competitive for logistics operations and export-oriented industrial companies.

== Investors ==
Devold is Norwegian textile manufacturer, producing sports textiles and protective clothing. In summer of 2015 the factory was opened and it takes up more than 15.000 square meters and employs more than 300 workers. Devold has invested more than 13 million euros in Panevėžys FEZ.

Spektrus EU is a Lithuanian advertising production service company that offers a full range of advertisement production services: visual outdoor and indoor advertising production, design, press and publishing, milling and other. The company employs more than 20 workers and has invested over 1 million euros into new production facilities.

IMG Lithuania is a subsidiary company of IMG Group A/S (Norway) that produces comfort furniture mostly for Northern American and Australian markets. IMG Group is part of the largest Norwegian furniture producer Ekornes Group. In Panevezys Free Economic Zone the group is constructing a 17.000 square meters combined production and distribution centre for the European market. First stage investments will reach 10 million euros and at least 125 new jobs will be created.

== Tax incentives ==
For clients, who invest at least 1 million euros into fixed assets (buildings, machinery, etc.), Panevėžys FEZ offers tax benefits:

| Taxes | Usual tax rates | Taxes FEZ % |
|---|---|---|
| Corporate profit tax | 15 % | 0% (first 10 years), 7,5% (next 6 years) |
| Real estate tax | 0,3 - 3% | 0% |
| Dividend tax | 15% | 0% |

== Photo gallery ==
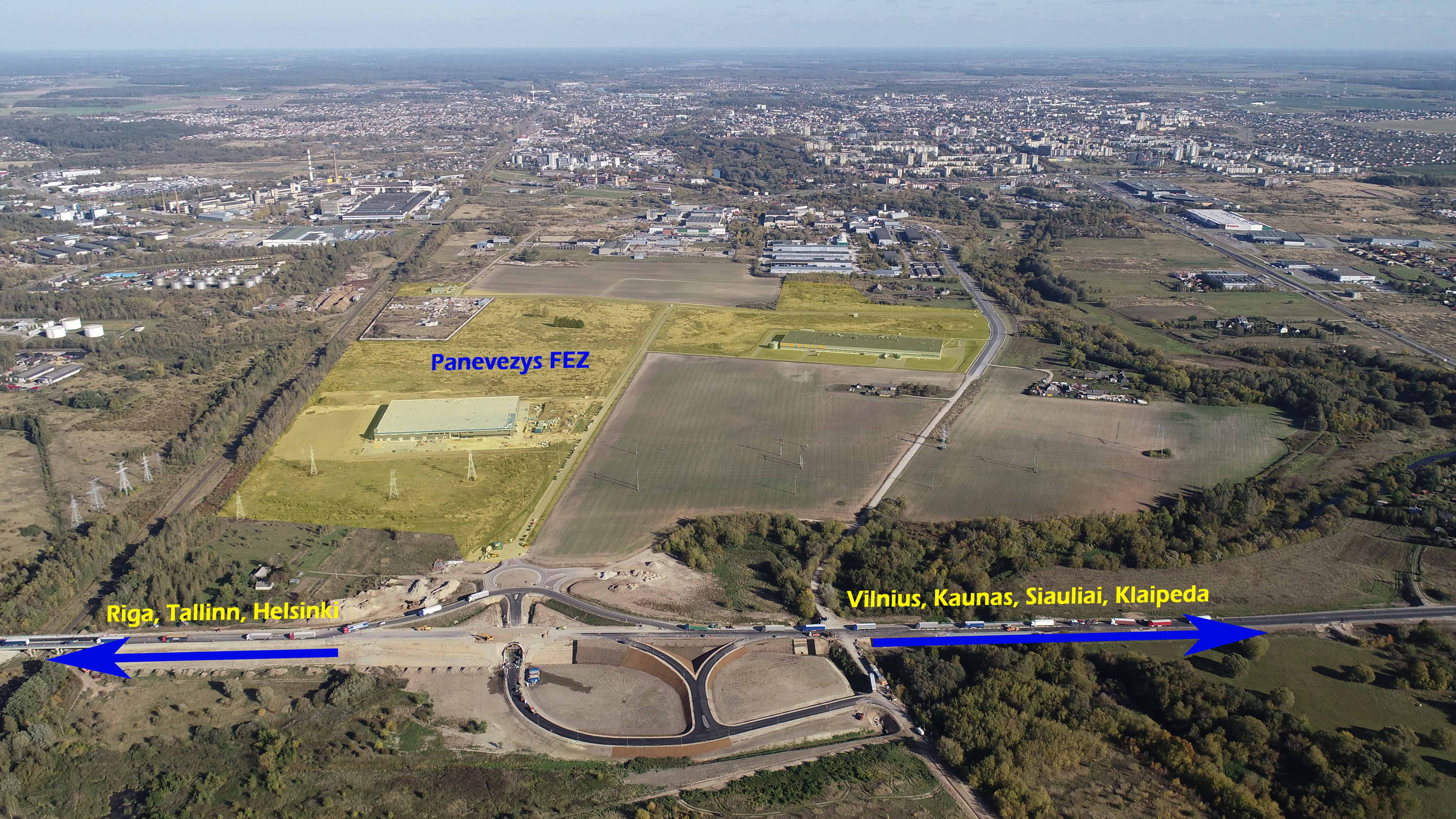

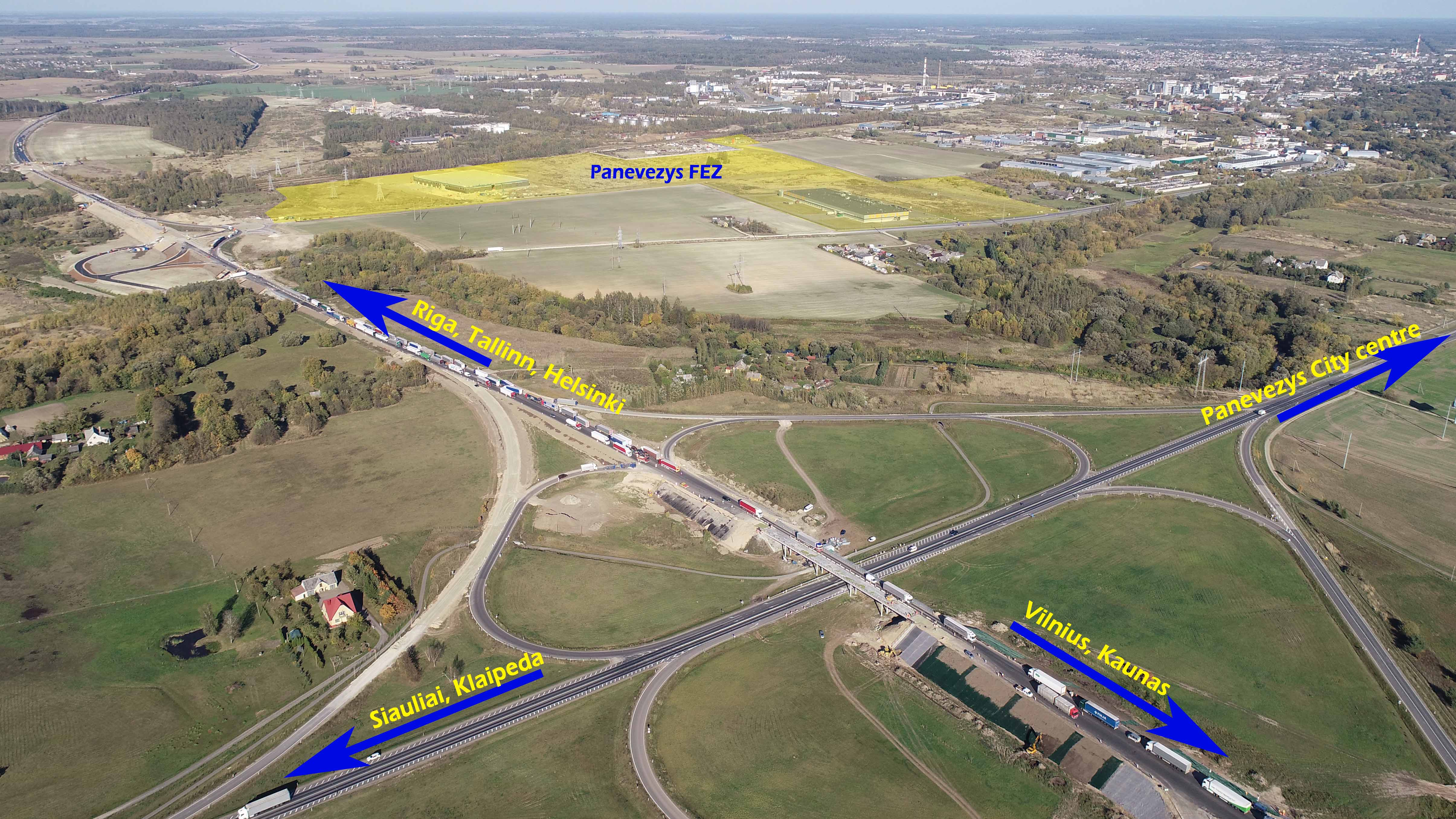

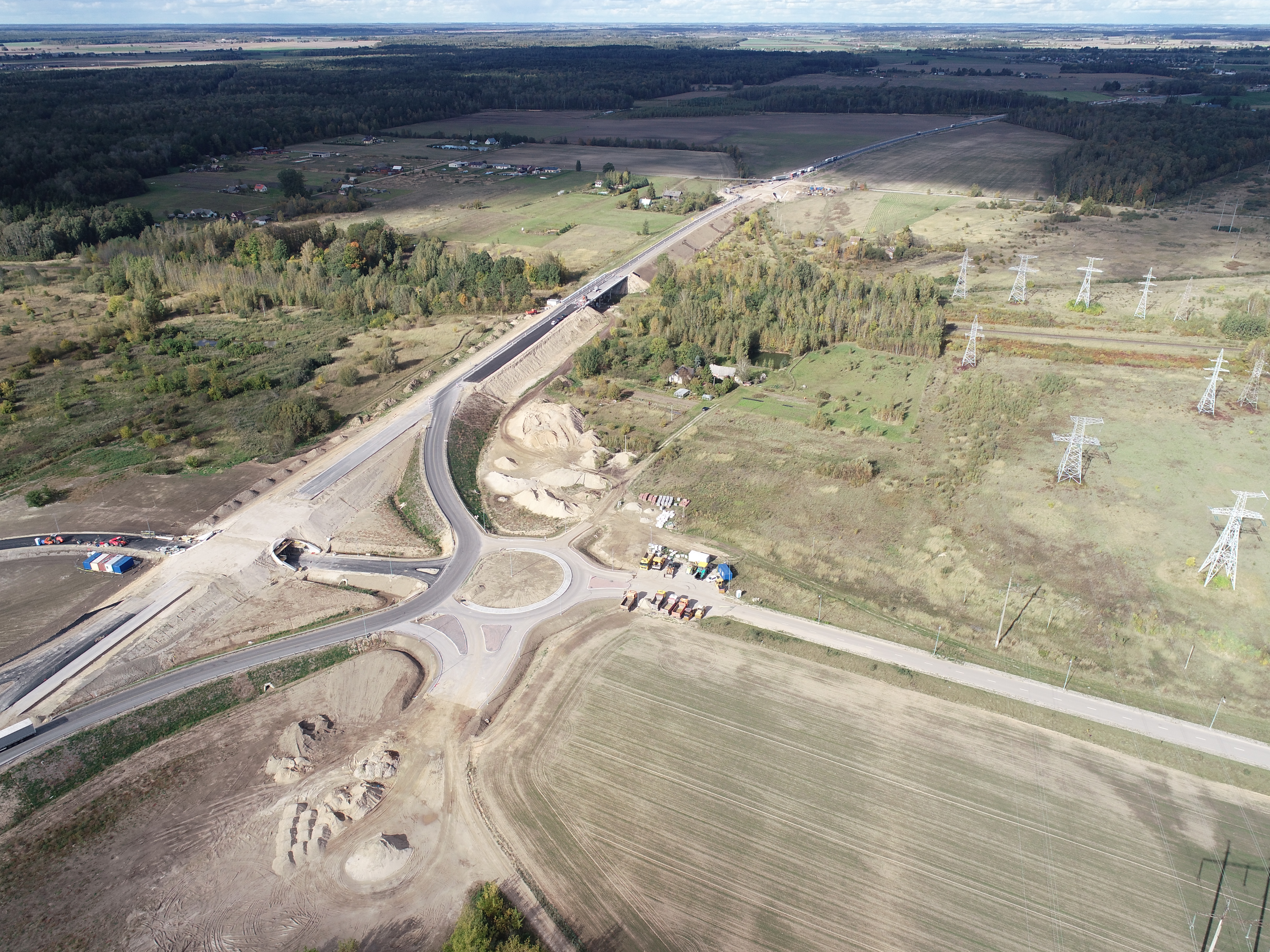

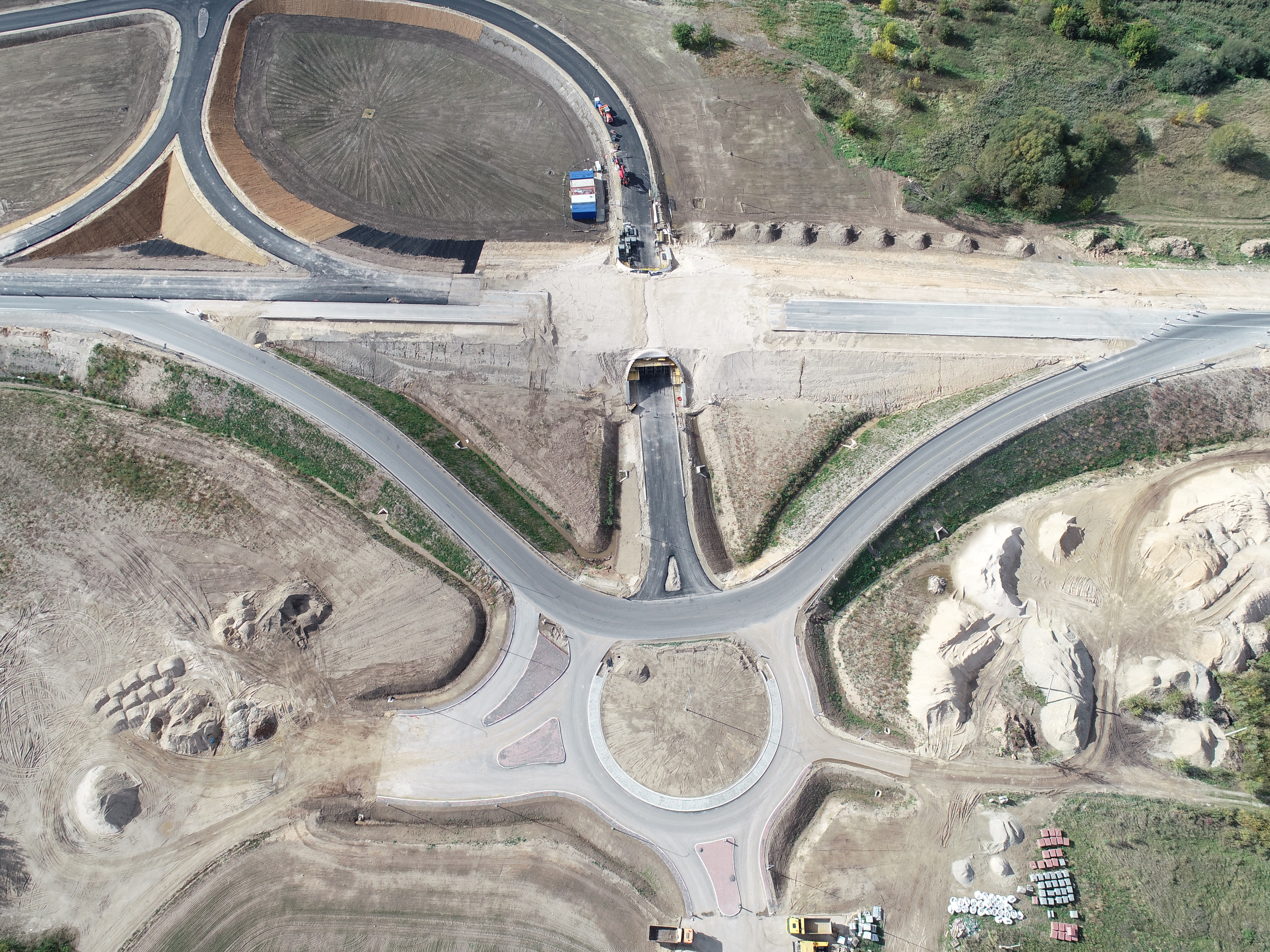

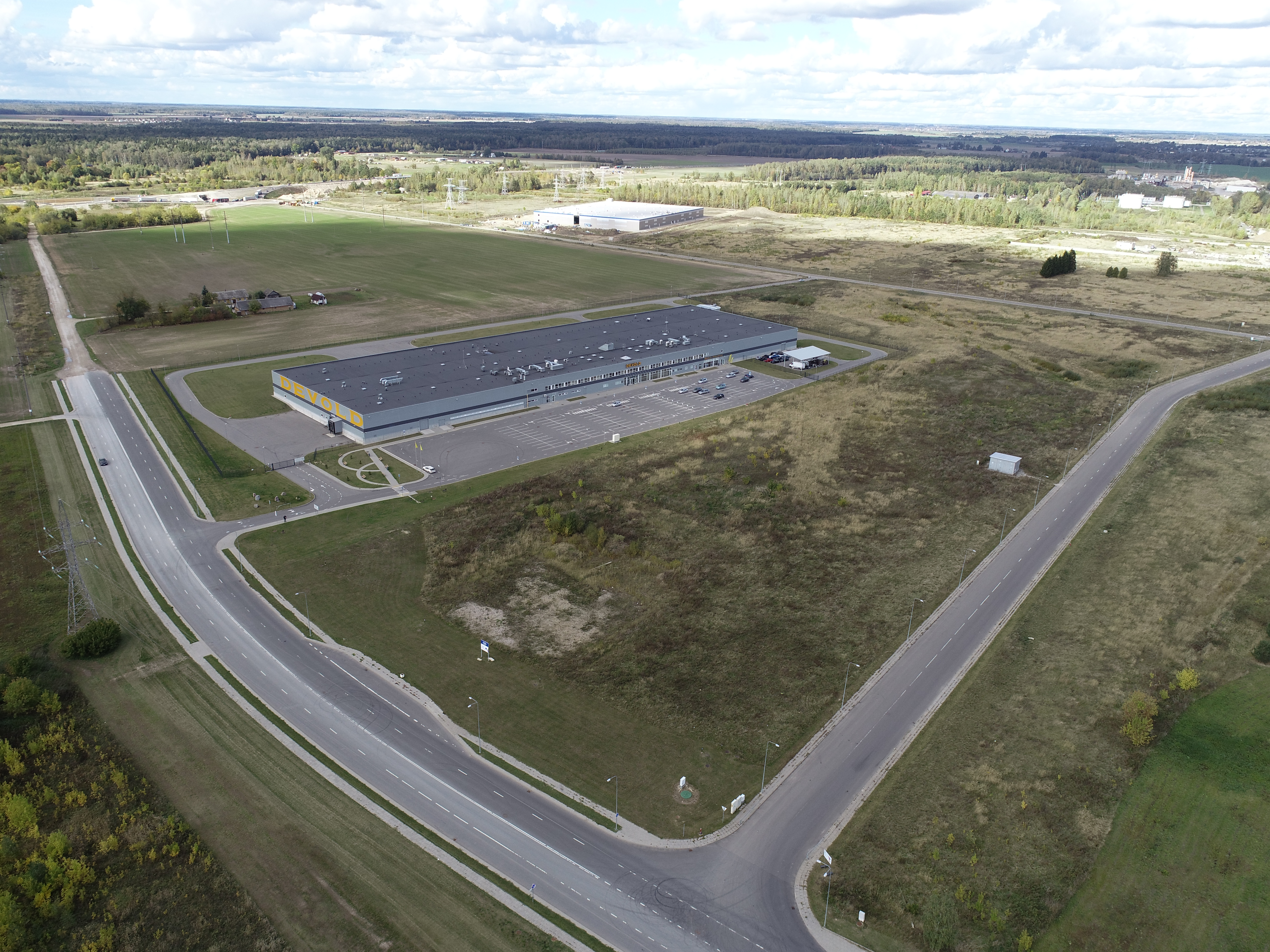

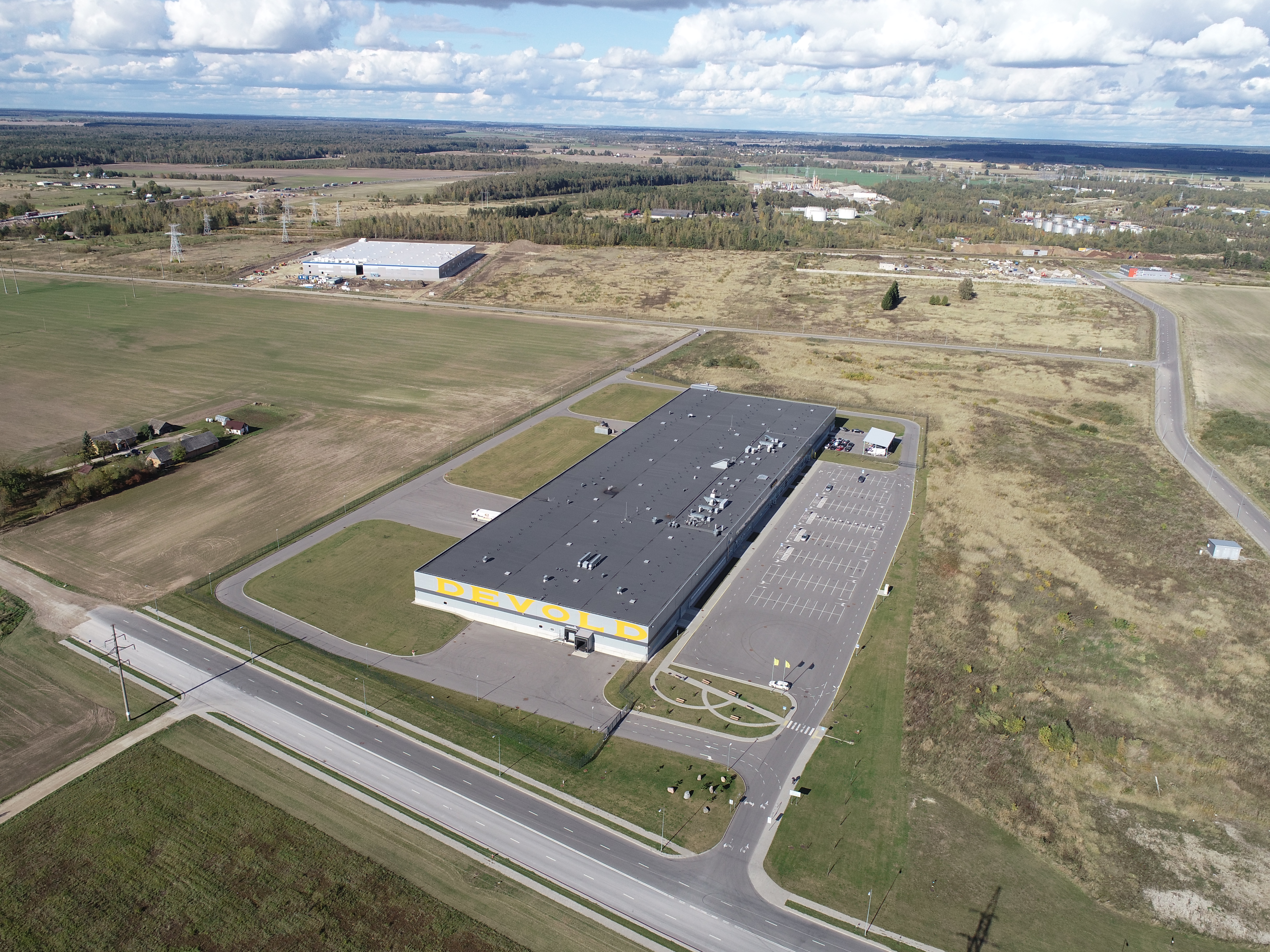

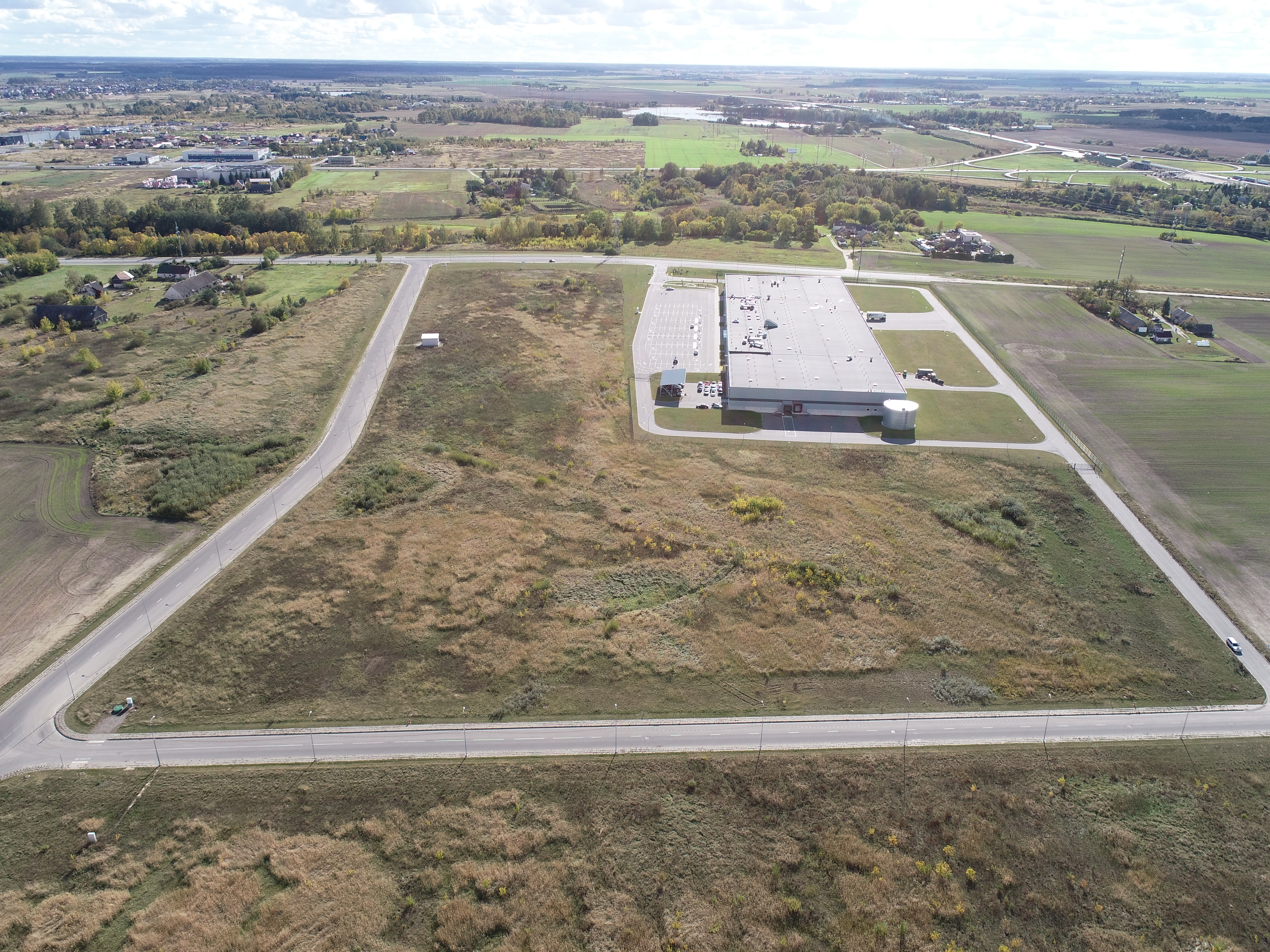

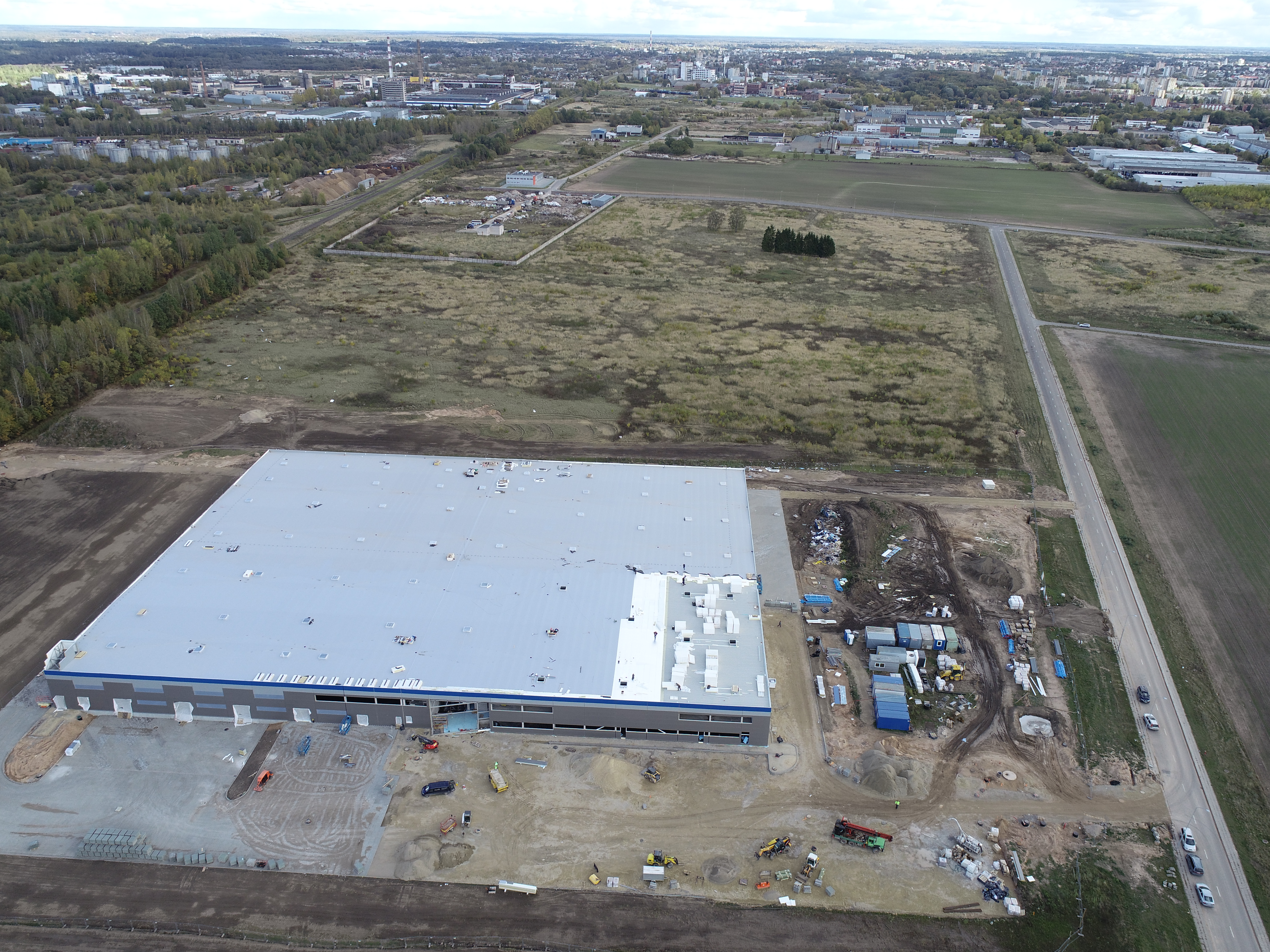
