= Guangdong Free-Trade Zone =

Guangdong Free-Trade Zone 中国（广东）自由贸易试验区
- Free-Trade Zone
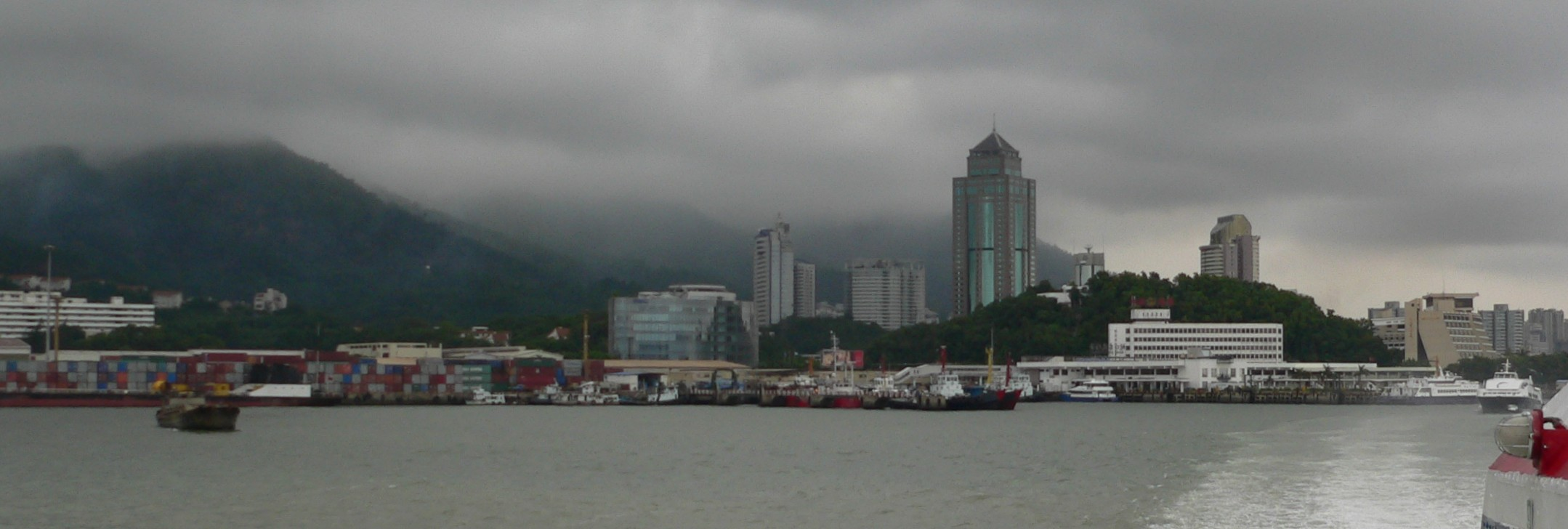
- Country: China
- Municipality: Guangzhou; Shenzhen; Zhuhai

Area
  - Total: 116.2 km^{2} (44.9 sq mi)
- Time zone: UTC+8 (China Standard)
- Website: http://www.china-gdftz.gov.cn/

Guangdong Free-Trade Zone (Guangdong FTZ, colloquially known as 广东自由贸易区/广东自贸区 in Chinese), officially China (Guangdong) Pilot Free-Trade Zone (Chinese: 中国（广东）自由贸易试验区; pinyin: Zhōngguó (Guǎngdōng) Zìyóu Màoyì Shìyànqū) is a free-trade zone in Guangdong province, China. It is a free-trade zone near Hong Kong and Macau. The zone covers an area of 116.2 square kilometres and integrates three existing bonded zones in four areas — Nansha New Area in Guangzhou (60 square kilometres), Qianhai and Shekou Industrial Zone (Qianhai Shekou Subdistrict) in Shenzhen (28.2 square kilometres) and Hengqin Subdistrict in Zhuhai (28 square kilometres).
