= Mongla Export Processing Zone =

Special economic zone in Bangladesh

Coordinates: 22.485°N 89.602°E

Mongla Export Processing Zone or Mongla EPZ (Bengali: মংলা রপ্তানী প্রক্রিয়াকরণ এলাকা) is one of the eight export processing zones under the Bangladesh Export Processing Zone Authority (BEPZA). It is located in Mongla and is adjacent to the Port of Mongla. It is currently being led by its Executive Director, The Honorable K. M. Mahbub-e-Sobhani.

== History ==
Mongla Export Processing Zone was inaugurated on 23 May 1998. The zone has received investment from 29 companies as of 2015, of which 16 have gone into production and rest are under construction. The zone has been complimented for housing some industrially fruitful corporations. Mongla EPZ performance has been well above government expectations.

== See also ==
- Bangladesh Export Processing Zone Authority
