= Bangladesh Export Processing Zone Authority =

Government agency

Bangladesh Export Processing Zones Authority
- বাংলাদেশ রপ্তানি প্রক্রিয়াকরণ অঞ্চল কর্তৃপক্ষ
- Logo of the BEPZA

Agency overview
- Jurisdiction: Government of Bangladesh
- Headquarters: BEPZA Complex, House no- 19/D, Rd No. 6, Green Rd, Dhaka 1205
- Agency executive: Major General Mohammad Moazzem Hossain (general), Executive Chairman
- Parent agency: Prime Minister's Office
- Website: www.bepza.gov.bd

The Bangladesh Export Processing Zones Authority (BEPZA) (Bengali: বাংলাদেশ রপ্তানী প্রক্রিয়াকরণ অঞ্চল কর্তৃপক্ষ) is an agency of the Government of Bangladesh and is administered under the jurisdiction of the Prime Minister's Office. It was established in 1981. Its objective is to manage the various export processing zones (EPZs) in Bangladesh.

== About ==
BEPZA currently oversees the operations of eight EPZs. A ninth zone is scheduled to open in the future. In 2015, it was reported that the government intended that in 15 years 100 new EPZs and special economic zones (SEZs) will be established. Major General Abul Kalam Mohammad Ziaur Rahman, ndc, psc is the current Executive Chairman of BEPZA. The Government provides numerous incentives for investors for opening factories in EPZs. For example, new factories enjoy a 5-year tax holiday. Also, labour unions and other activities that are often viewed detrimental to productivity, are banned inside the EPZs. In order to stimulate rapid economic growth of the country, particularly through industrialization, the government has adopted an 'Open Door Policy' to attract foreign investment to Bangladesh. The BEPZA is the official organ of the government to promote, attract and facilitate foreign investment in the EPZs. Besides, BEPZA as the competent Authority performs inspection & supervision of the compliances of the enterprises related to social & environmental issues, safety & security at the workplace in order to maintain harmonious labour-management & industrial relations in EPZs. The primary objective of an EPZ is to provide special areas where potential investors would find a congenial investment climate free from cumbersome procedures. Bangladesh's export revenue in FY23 is $55.55 billion, the highest amount ever.

== Export processing zones ==
Below is the list of export processing zones run by BEPZA:

- Adamjee Export Processing Zone, Siddhirganj, Narayanganj
- Chittagong Export Processing Zone, South Halishahar, Chittagong
- Cumilla Export Processing Zone, Cumilla
- Dhaka Export Processing Zone, Savar, Dhaka
- Ishwardi Export Processing Zone, Ishwardi, Pabna
- Karnaphuli Export Processing Zone, North Patenga, Chittagong
- Mongla Export Processing Zone, Mongla, Bagerhat
- Uttara Export Processing Zone, Nilphamari

== Newly established and proposed economic zone ==
Recently Government has approved 37 new Economic zones, which consists governmental, non-governmental and Specialized Economic zone. Bangladesh government also announced 50pc tax relief in Hi-Tech parks, Economic Zones.

- Lakshmipur Special Economic Zone – LSEZ (announced by PM Sheikh Hasina in 2017)
- Patuakhali Economic Zone (EPZ) – (under construction)
- Sirajgong Economic Zone (under construction)
- Bagerhat Economic Zone (under construction)
- Mirsarai Economic Zone, Chittagong (under construction)
- Anowara (Gohira) Economic Zone, Chittagong (under construction)
- Srihotto Economic Zone, Maulavibazar (under construction)
- Sripur Economic Zone (Japanese Economic Zone), Gazipur (under construction)
- Sabrang Special Economic Zone (under construction)
- Agailjhara Economic Zone, Barisal (under construction)
- Anowara Economic Zone-2, Chittagong (under construction) named as Canadian EPZ
- Jamalpur Economic Zone (approved)
- Gaibandha Export Processing Zone (under construction)
- Rangpur Export Processing Zone (under construction)
- Narayangonj Economic Zone (under construction)
- Narayangonj Economic Zone-2 (under construction)
- Ashuganj Economic Zone (under construction)
- Kushtia Economic Zone (under construction)
- Panchagar Economic Zone (under construction)
- Nilphamari Economic Zone (under construction)
- Narshingdi Economic Zone (under construction)
- Manikganj Economic Zone (under construction)
- Dohar Economic Zone, Dhaka (under construction)
- Habiganj Economic Zone (under construction)
- Shariatpur Economic Zone (under construction)
- Jaliardip Economic Zone, Teknaf-Cox's Bazar (under construction)
- Natore Economic Zone (under construction)
- Maheskhali Economic Zone-1 (under construction)
- Maheskhali Economic Zone-2 (under construction)
- Maheskhali Economic Zone-3 (under construction)
- Cox'sbazar Free trade Zone (Maheskhali)(under construction)
- Shariatpur Economic Zone-2 (under construction)

== Non-government economic zone ==
Government also encouraged building of private economic zone. Some are under construction and some are operational.

- Meghna Industrial Economic Zone (under construction)
- Meghna Economic Zone (under construction)
- Fomcom non-governmental Economic Zone (proposed)
- A.K. Khan non-governmental Economic Zone (operational)
- Abdul Monem Economic Zone (operational)
- Comilla Economic Zone (operational)
- Garments industrial park (operational)
- Sonargaon Economic Zone (operational)
- PowerPac Economic Zone (Mongla)

== Science and technology based economic zone ==
Bangladesh government has been establishing science and technology-based economic zone to attract foreign FDI. Some projects like Kaliakoir high tech park helped by the World Bank and DFID.

- Janata tower Software Park (completed)
- Jashore Software Technology Park (opened)
- Kaliakoir high tech park (Block development ongoing)
- Keranigonj Special IT Economic Zone, Dhaka (under construction)
- Dhaka high tech park (proposed)
- Khulna high tech park (proposed)
- Rajhshahi high tech park (Land acquiring)
- Sylhet Electronic City (under construction)
- Sylhet high tech park (Land acquiring)
- Chittagong high tech park (Land acquiring)
- CUET IT business incubator centre, Chittagong (under construction)
- Rangpur high tech park (Land acquiring)
- Barisal high tech park (Land acquiring)
- Mohakhali IT Village (Land acquiring)

== See also ==
- Special economic zone
