= 7th Infantry Division (Bangladesh) =

Division of the Bangladesh army

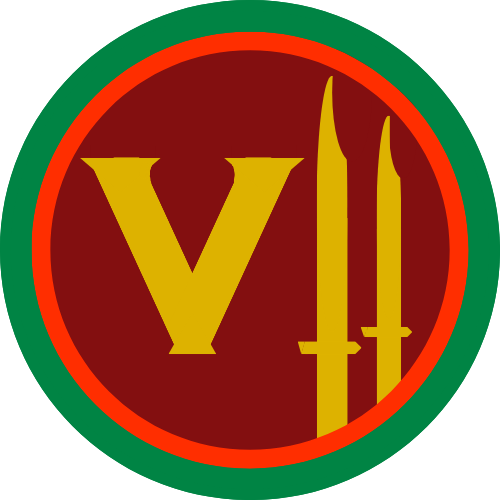
- 7th Infantry Division Insignia
- Active: 8 February 2018 – present
- Country: Bangladesh
- Branch: Bangladesh Army
- Type: Infantry
- Size: Division
- Garrison/HQ: Lebukhali Cantonment

Commanders
- Current commander: Major General Abu Hena Mohammad Razi Hasan

Insignia
- Division flag

The 7th Infantry Division is a formation of the Bangladesh Army. Headquartered in Barisal, the division was inaugurated as part of the Forces Goal 2030.

== History ==
On 14 November 2017, the executive committee of the National Economic Council approved the project. Prime Minister Sheikh Hasina inaugurated Lebukhali Cantonment and hoisted the flag of the 7th Infantry Division headquarters on 8 February 2018. The project had an estimated cost of 16 million Bangladeshi taka ($205,000 as of 2018) as part of the Forces Goal 2030 budget.

== Organisation ==
At its founding, a total of 15,512 posts and 33 military units were planned to be created in 11 phases under the new infantry division. The current general officer commanding of the division is Major General Abu Hena Muhammad Razi Hasan. As of 2018, there were 11 units under this division. Under the division, there was one infantry brigade, one artillery brigade, and one armoured regiment.

Combat arms

- Artillery
  - 7th Artillery Brigade
- Infantry
  - 6th Infantry Brigade
  - 28th Infantry Brigade
  - 30th Infantry Brigade
  - 35th Bangladesh Infantry Regiment
- Cavalry
  - 26th Horse Regiment
- Combat support
  - Field Intelligence Unit (FIU)
