= Uttara Export Processing Zone =

Export processing zone in Nilphamari, Bangladesh

Coordinates: 25.858082°N 88.863838°E

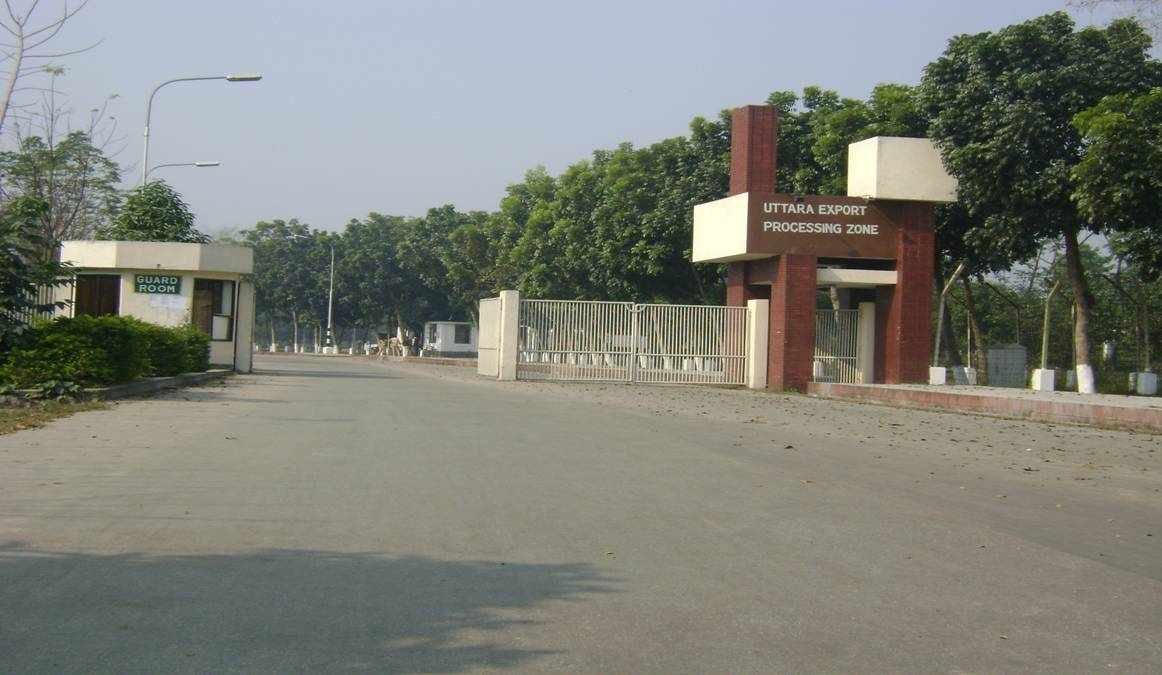
- Interactive map of Uttara Export Processing Zone
- Location: Nilphamari
- Opening date: 2001
- Owner: Prime Minister's Office
- No. of workers: 30000
- Size: 213.66 acres (86.47 ha)

Uttara Export Processing Zone (UEPZ) (Bengali: উত্তরা রপ্তানি প্রক্রিয়াকরণ অঞ্চল), also known as Uttara EPZ or Nilphamari EPZ, is the seventh of the eight export processing zone in Bangladesh located at Nilphamari. It is the only export processing zone of Rangpur Division/North Bengal. It was established in September 2001 over 213.66 acres in Sangloshi area in Nilphamari town.

== See also ==
- Bangladesh Export Processing Zone Authority
- Nilphamari District
