= List of supermarket chains in Latvia =

Below this is a list of supermarket chains in Latvia.

Name	Stores	Parent
LaTS	700	SIA Latvijas Tirgotāju savienība
Aibė (Aibe)	536	Aljansas AIBĖ, UAB
Maxima X	125	Maxima Group
Maxima XX	24	Maxima Group
Maxima XXX	8	Maxima Group
Rimi Hyper	37	Salling group
Rimi Super	33	Salling group
Rimi Mini	55	Salling group
Rimi Express	6	Salling group
Lidl	30	SIA Lidl Latvija
Mego	90	SIA Baltstor
Spar	25	SIA SPAR Latvija
Vesko	81	SIA Baltstor
SKY	5	SIA SKAI BALTIJA
Top!	119	Iepirkumu grupa
mini Top!	81	Iepirkumu grupa
Beta	37	SIA Beta
Elvi	74	SIA Elvi Latvija
CITRO	70	SIA Latvian Retail Management
Vynoteka	13	Gelsva UAB
Lindex	12	Stockmann
Drogas	95	A.S. Watson Group
Austris	8	SIA Austris AG
DEPO	14	SIA DEPO DIY
PROMO Cash&Carry	6	SIA Sanitex

== Former operations ==
- Selver (operated in Latvia 2008–2009)
- Prisma (closed the stores in Latvia 2017)
- Cento (renamed IKI Cento)
- Nelda (renamed IKI Nelda)
- IKI (renamed Mego)
- Supernetto (renamed Rimi Mini)
- Citymarket (renamed Rimi Hyper)
- T-Market (renamed Maxima)
- Saulīte (renamed Maxima)
- Saules veikals (renamed Elvi)
