= Norfa =

Lithuanian supermarket chain

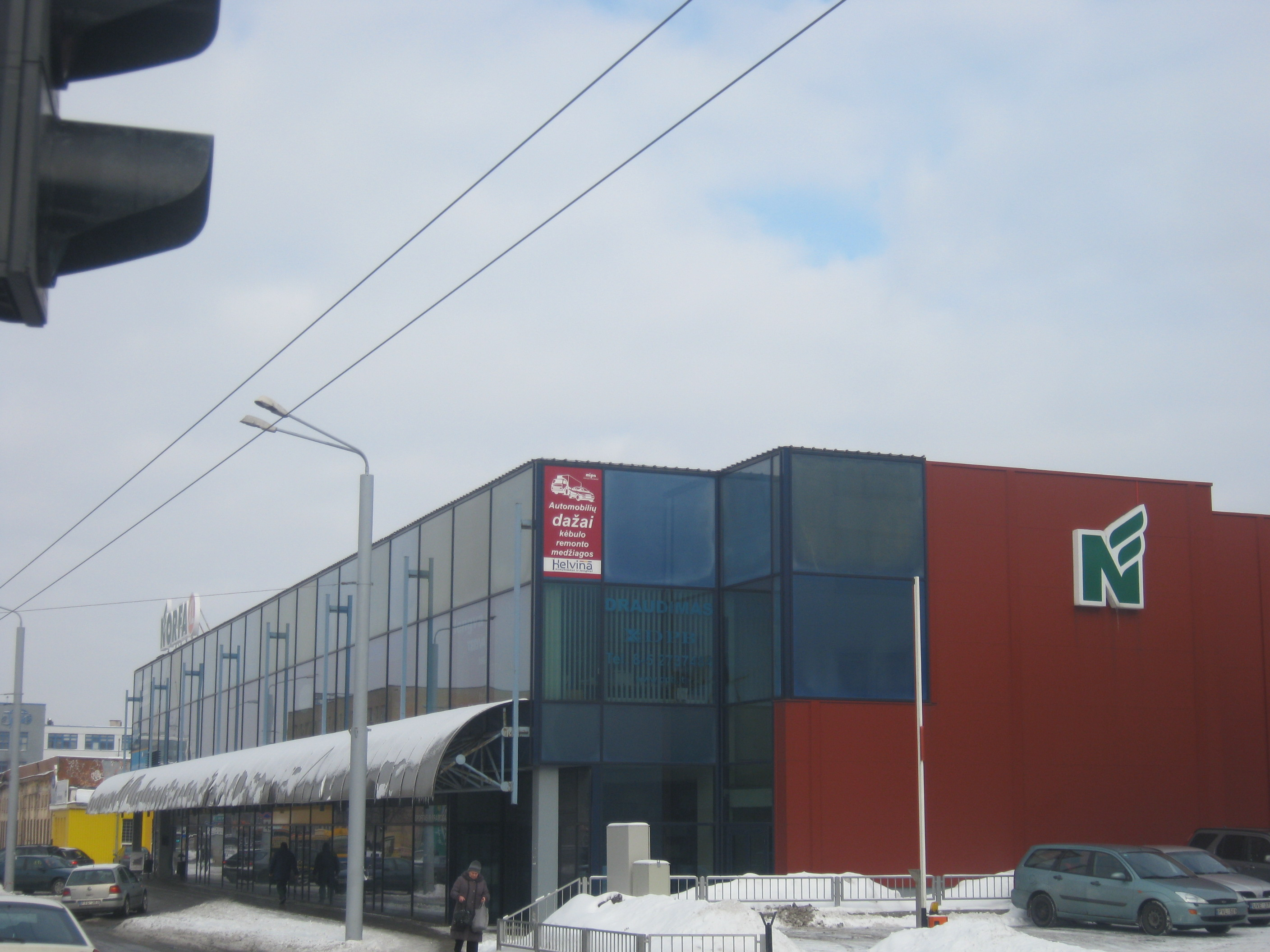
- XL Norfa in Vilnius
- Trade name: Norfa
- Native name: Norfa
- Industry: Retail
- Founded: 1997
- Headquarters: Vilnius, Lithuania
- Area served: Lithuania
- Key people: CEO Audrius Pocevičius
- Revenue: ▲€678.507 million (2022)
- Operating income: ▲€19.382 million
- Net income: ▲€15.630 million
- Total assets: ▲€117.220 million
- Total equity: ▲€62.533 million
- Number of employees: 3 503 (2024)
- Parent: Norfos Mažmena
- Website: www.norfa.lt

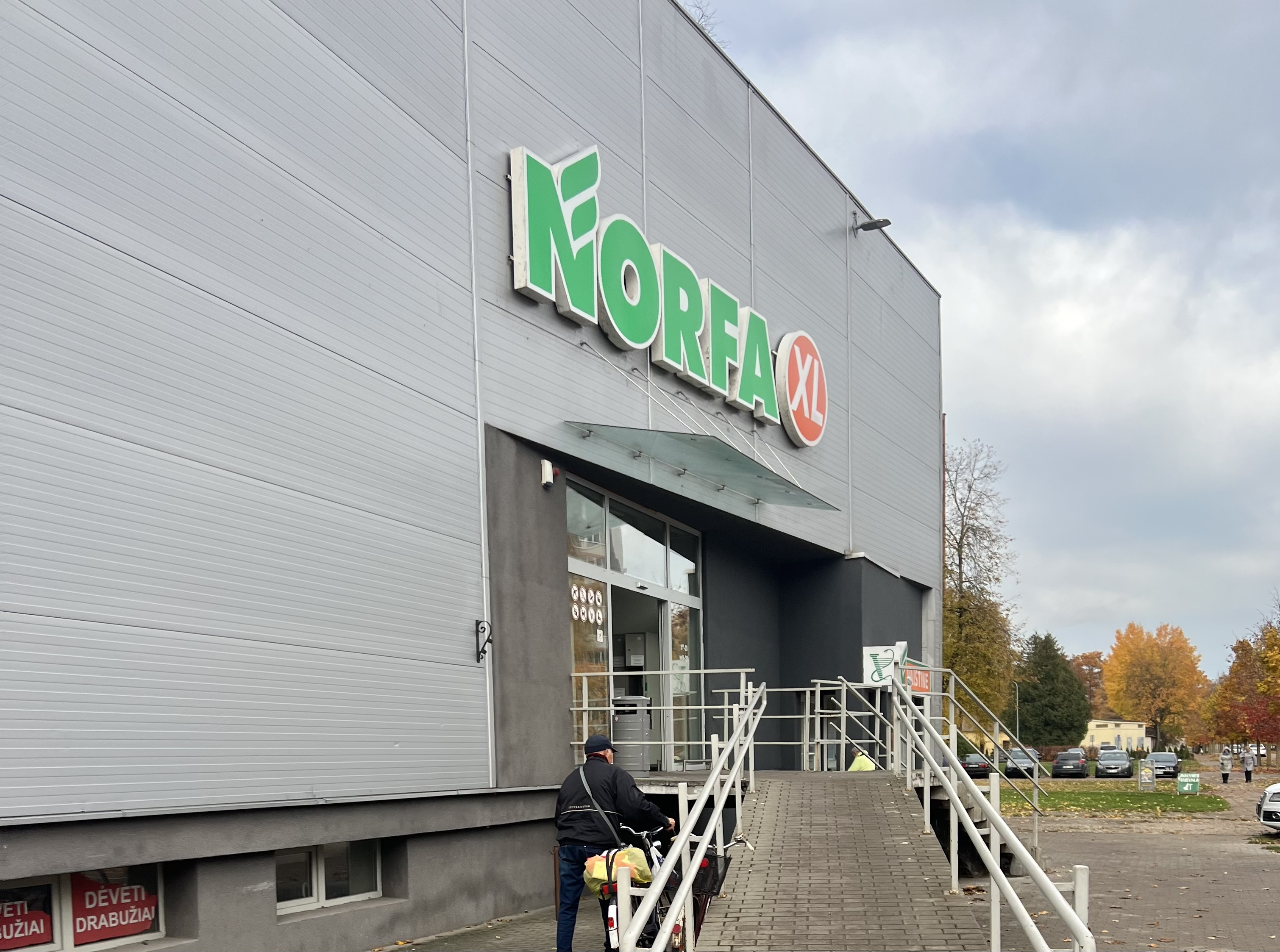
XL size Norfa in Druskininkai

Norfa is a supermarket chain in Lithuania. In 2022, it was fourth largest chain of retail stores in Lithuania.

Norfa chain stores sizes (in square meters):

- S – less than 200
- L – 200 to 500
- XL – 500 to 1,500
- XXL – 1,500 to 3,000
- H – more than 3,000

The first Norfa store was opened in Žirmūnai, Vilnius. In 2023, Norfa opened new stores in Klaipėda, Plungė, Raseiniai, Telšiai and Vilnius. From September 2023 customers will no longer be able to pay for utility services in Norfa stores. According to 15min, Norfa pays highest salaries among other supermarket chains in Lithuania with average monthly net salary reaching €1,046 (€1,633 gross).

== History ==
UAB "Norfos mažmena" was established in 1997. The company opened its first store in 1997. By the end of 2004 company had 87 stores. In 2022, this number reached 155.

== See also ==
- List of supermarket chains in Lithuania
