= Rimi Baltic =

Company based in Riga, Latvia

RIMI Baltic

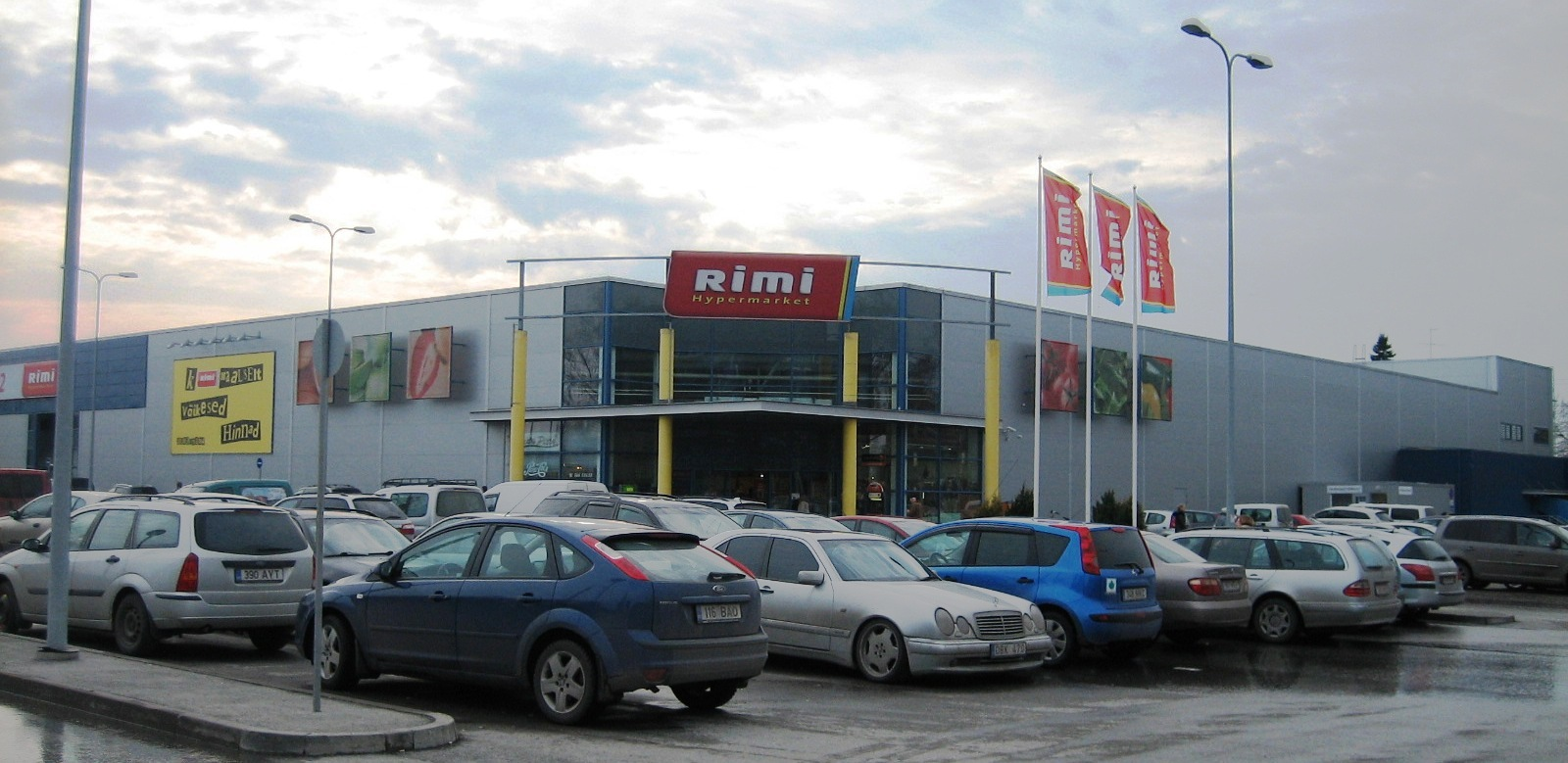
- Rimi hypermarket in Tallinn
- Type: Private
- Industry: Retail, general merchandise
- Founded: 1996; 30 years ago
- Founder: Stein Erik Hagen
- Headquarters: Riga, Latvia
- Area served: Estonia, Latvia, Lithuania
- Key people: Giedrius Bandzevičius
- Products: Groceries, consumer goods
- Revenue: SEK21.874 billion €1.913 billion
- Net income: 747,698 (2023)
- Total assets: 8,966,894 (2023)
- Number of employees: 11,000
- Parent: Salling Group
- Subsidiaries: Rimi Estonia (Rimi Eesti Food AS); Rimi Latvia (Rimi Latvia, SIA); Rimi Lithuania (Rimi Lietuva, UAB)
- Website: www.rimibaltic.com

Rimi Baltic is a major retail operator in the Baltic states based in Riga, Latvia. It is a subsidiary of Danish Salling Group.

Rimi Baltic operates 317 retail stores within Estonia (84 stores), Latvia (143 stores) and Lithuania (90 stores) and has distribution centres in each country.

The stores have different profiles, depending on range of products and size:

- Rimi Hyper – hypermarkets
- Rimi Super – supermarkets
- Rimi Mini – grocery stores
- Rimi Express – convenience stores

== History and ownership ==
SIA „Rimi Baltija“ was founded in 1996 as an offshoot of Norwegian retailer Rimi. The retail operator history begins with the opening of the first retail in Latvia, the Dole shopping center, on February 20, 1997. In 1998, both retailers were acquired by the ICA Gruppen.

In 1999, it acquired Ekovalda grocery chain in Lithuania. All groups retail locations were transferred to the company, but it continued to operate them under local brand. In 2000, consolidation of these companies under the single pan-Baltic Rimi identity was started.

Rimi Baltic was created in 2004 when Finnish Kesko and Swedish ICA agreed to merge their operations in the Baltic states in a 50/50 joint venture. Rimi Baltic officially began operations on 1 January 2005.

Kesko previously had 6 K-Citymarket hypermarkets and 45 Säästumarket discount food stores in Estonia and 5 K-Citymarkets in Latvia and 19 Supernetto discount outlets in Latvia. ICA previously owned 33 Rimi stores (supermarkets and compact hypermarkets) across Estonia, Latvia, and Lithuania. Following the merger, all the K-Citymarket stores were progressively converted to Rimi hypermarkets during 2005.

Towards the end of 2006, Kesko decided to pull out of the joint venture and sold all of its shares in Rimi Baltic to ICA. Rimi Baltic became a wholly owned subsidiary of ICA AB from 1 January 2007. Property deals relating to Kesko's ownership of the former Citymarket sites were completed a few days later.

On December 23, 2016, ICA Gruppen concluded an agreement on the purchase of the Lithuanian company UAB Palink for EUR 213 million. Palink managed the second-largest food retail network, IKI in Lithuania. The Lithuanian Competition Council authorized this acquisition in October 2017 on the condition that 17 Rimi and Iki stores in Vilnius, Kaunas, Klaipeda and Panevezys will be sold to third parties. In mid-March 2018, Rimi Lietuva submitted nominations of potential buyers to the Competition Council. The council did not support them on the grounds that these buyers "would not provide stable and at least as effective competition" as the current company until the deal is implemented. In April, the Competition Council announced that the sale of Iki to Rimi was terminated.

=== Sale to Salling Group ===
Swedish group ICA Gruppen agreed to sell the chain to Danish Salling Group for a sale price of 1.3 billion euros, excluding debts, company representatives told the media on March 5, 2025, pending regulatory approval. The European Commission approved the deal on 5 May 2025, with the transfer being expected to be completed by June 2025. The transfer was completed on June 2, 2025.

== Rimi in other countries ==
The Rimi name could also be found in Norway where it originated when founder Stein Erik Hagen rebranded a store. It has been used on ICA's discount food stores there, but were later operating under the name Coop Norway (the Rimi stores were rebranded to Coop Extra). Stein Erik Hagen sold most of his shares to ICA over a period of time. It has previously been used in Sweden by ICA and in Finland by Kesko, although these stores have since been converted to other formats.

The interior design of the smaller Rimi hypermarkets (known as compact hypermarkets) can also be seen in ICA's smaller hypermarkets in Sweden, such as ICA Maxi Västra Hamnen in Malmö and ICA Maxi Enköping.

== Stores ==
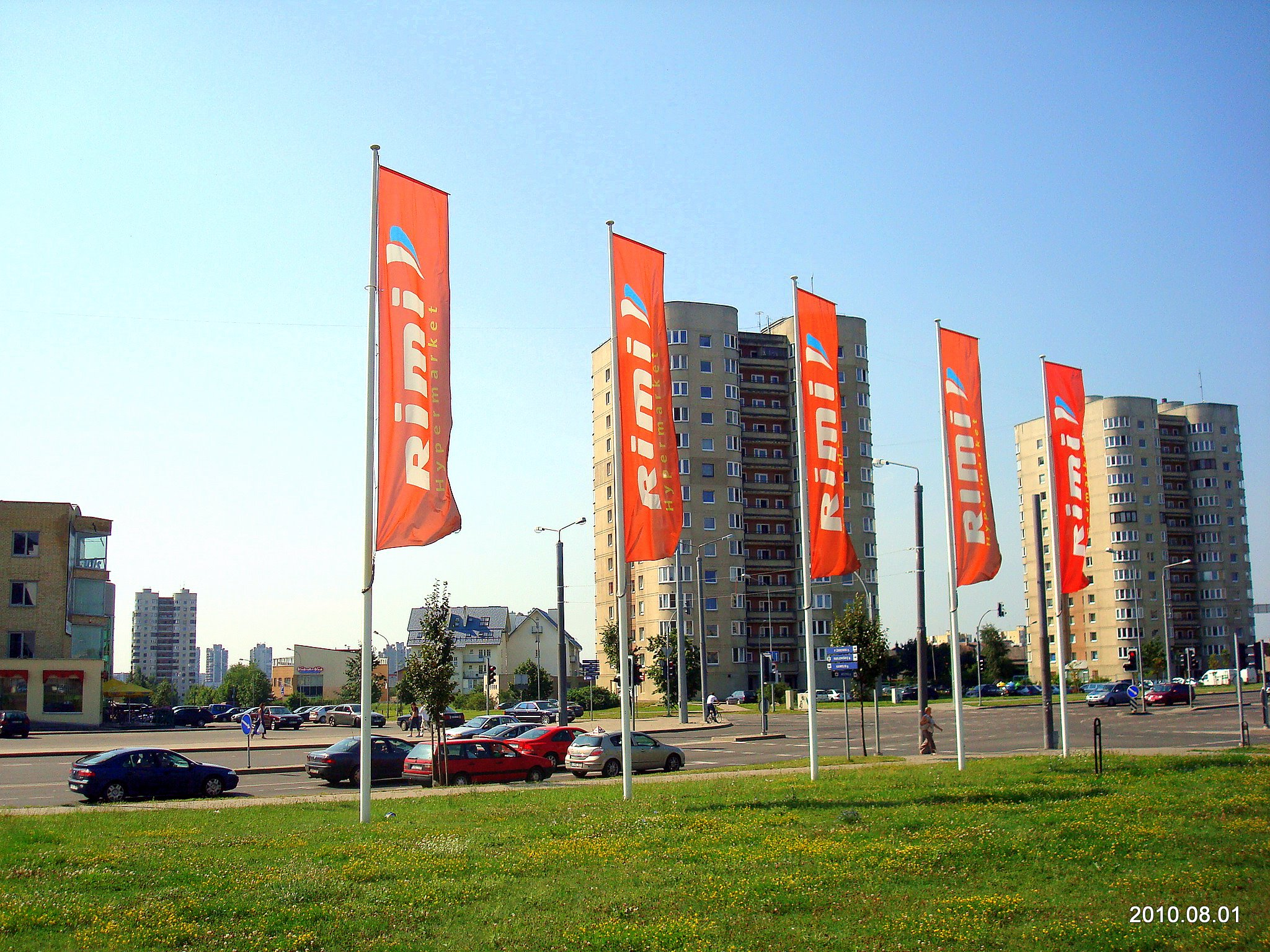
Rimi hypermarket's flags

Rimi Baltic operates a grocery retail business and has 314 wholly owned stores in Estonia, Latvia and Lithuania. The properties owned by the Group in the Baltic region are also part of Rimi Baltic.

Latvia: 143 stores
Lithuania: 90 stores
Estonia: 84 stores

== Images ==
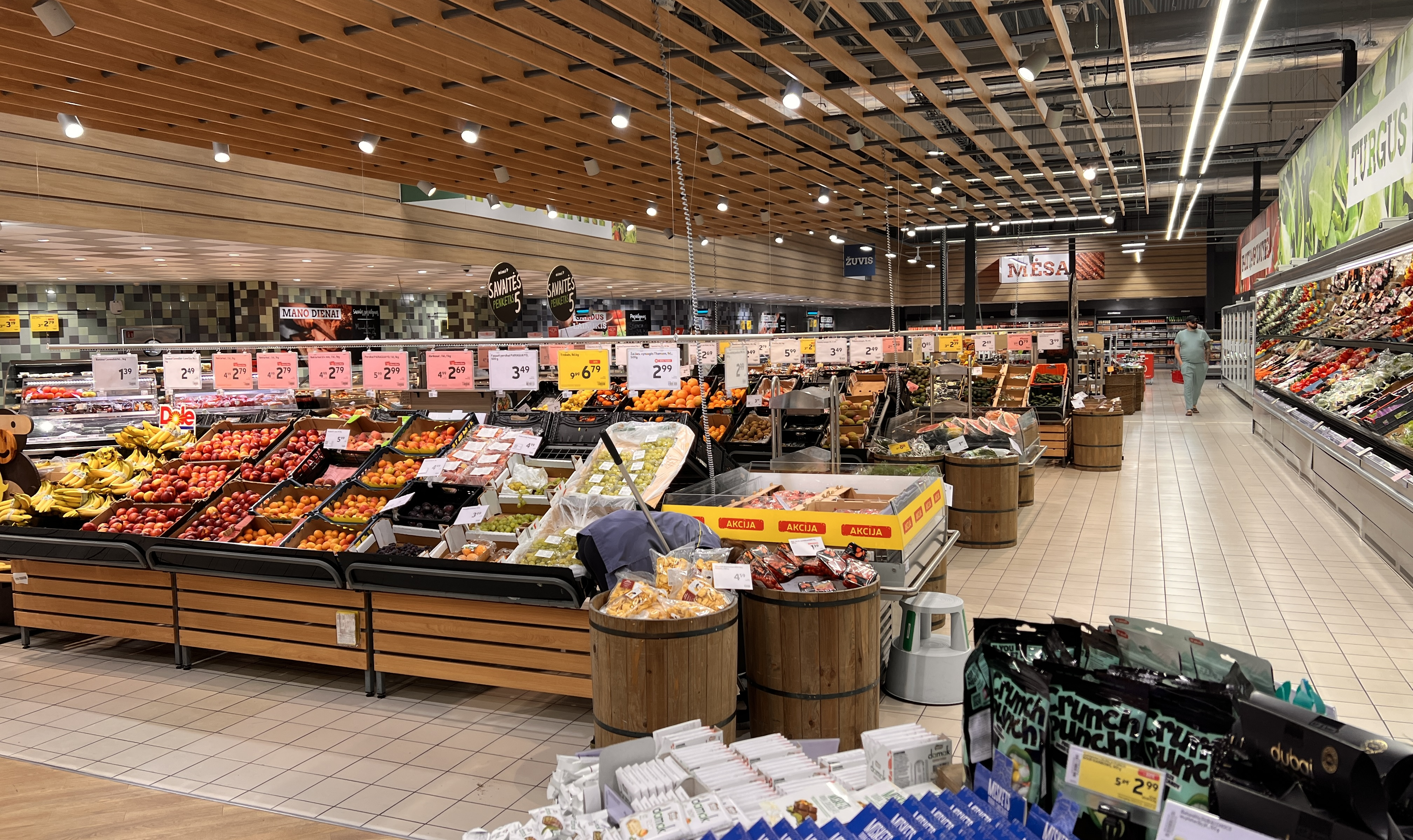
Produce section of the Rimi supermarket in Mega mall in Kaunas (2025).

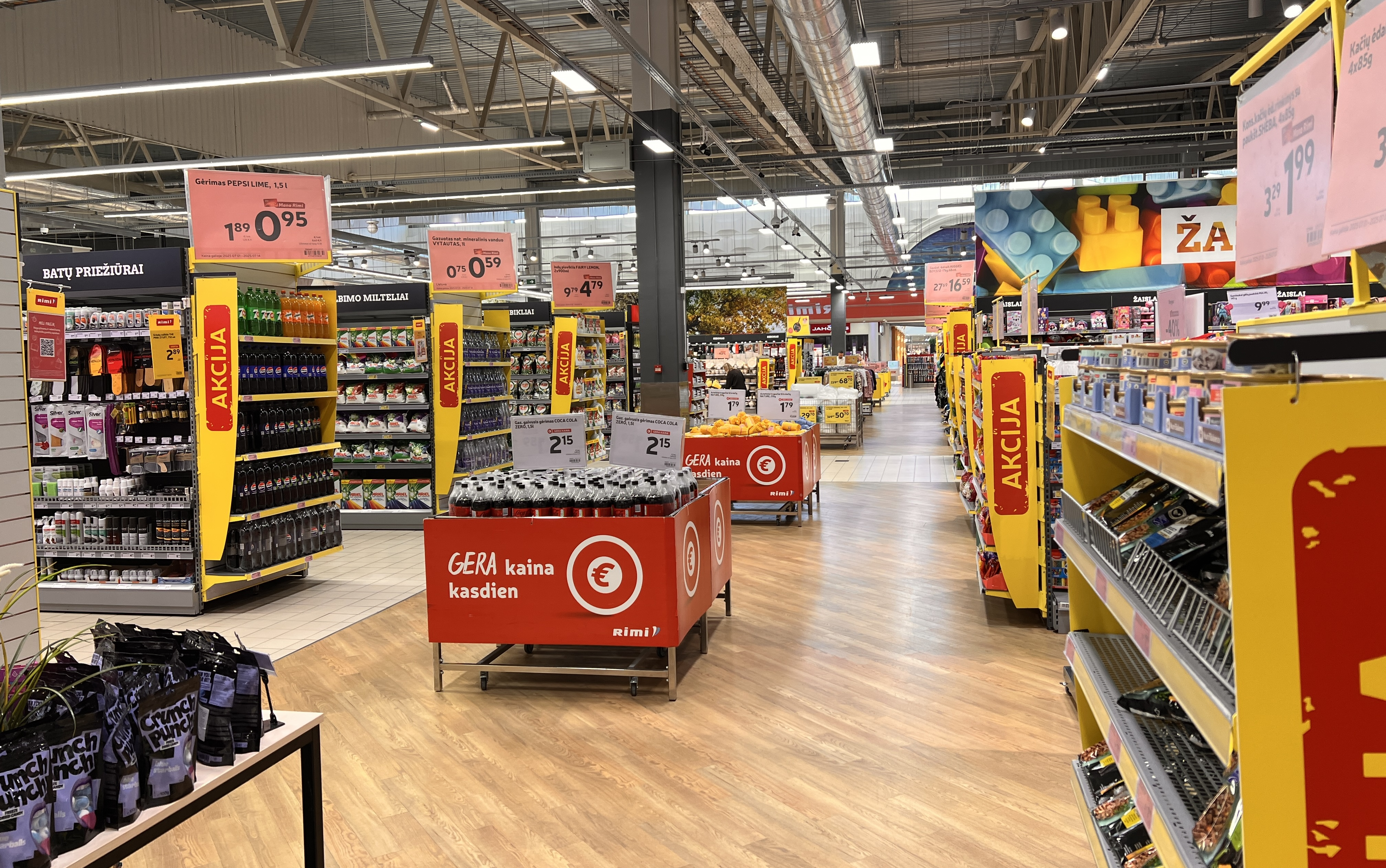
An aisle in the same supermarket (2025).

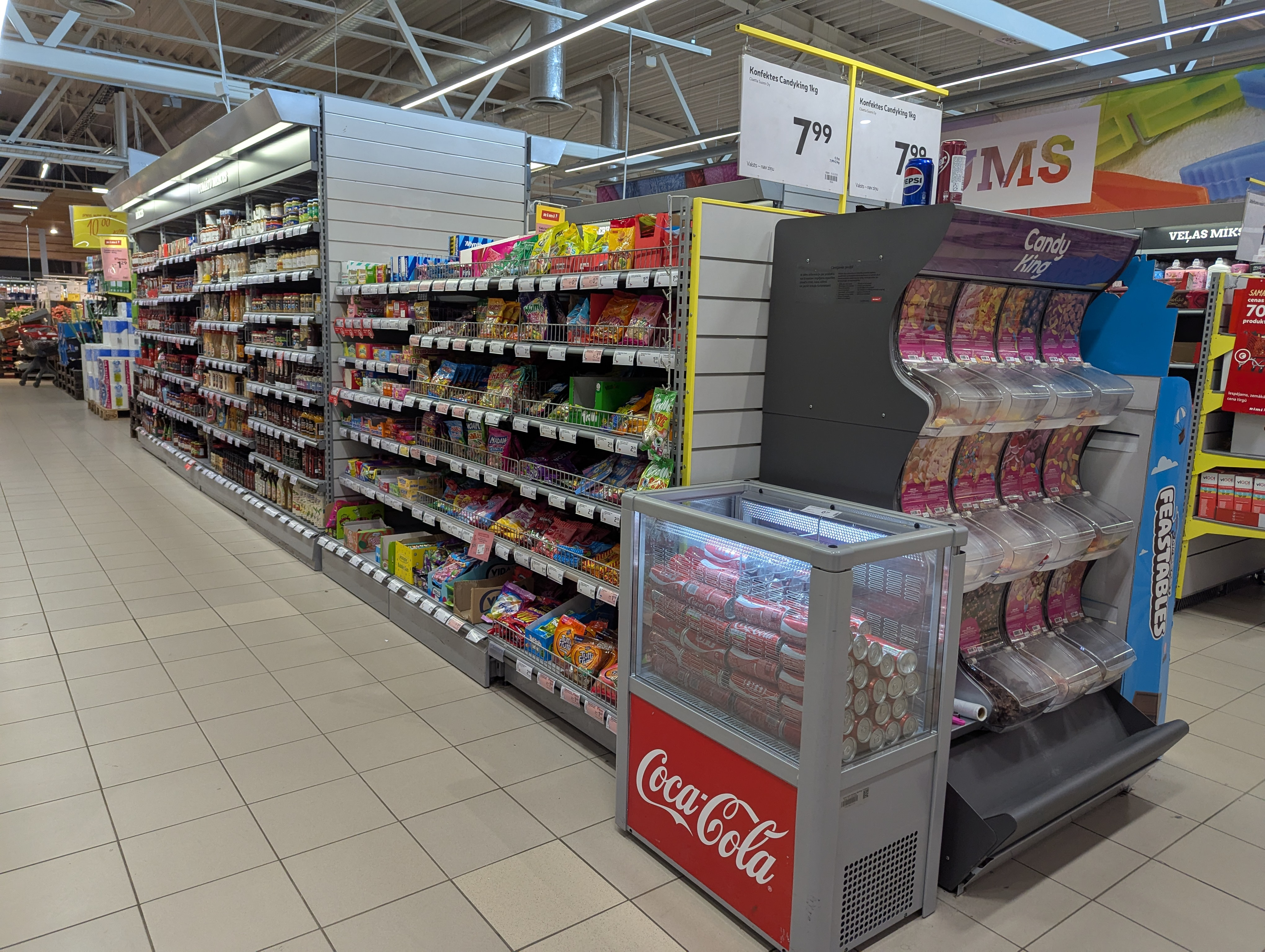
Interior of a Rimi in Bauska (2025).

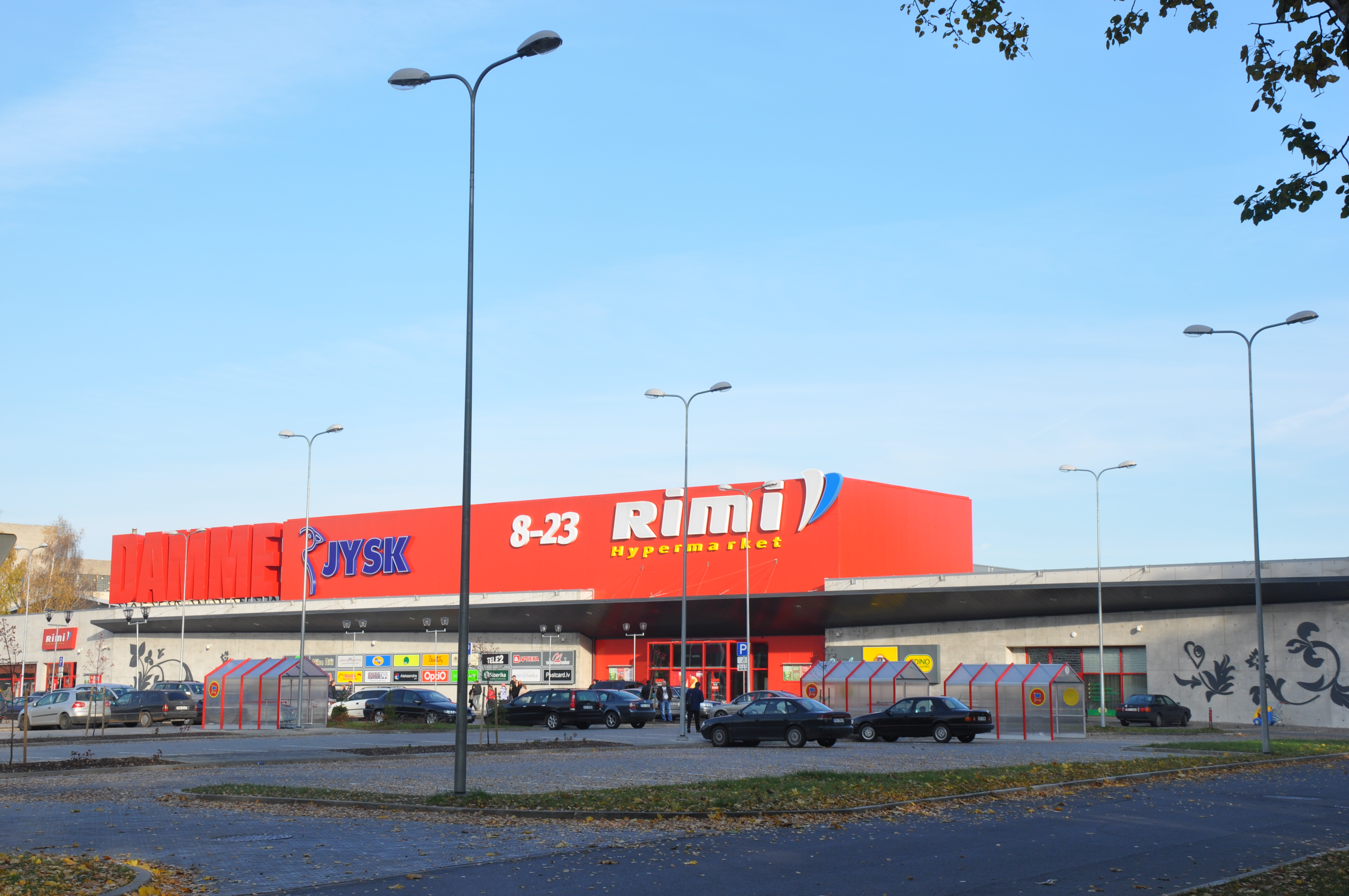
Rimi hypermarket in Riga (2011).

Auriga shopping centre in Kuressaare has Rimi as anchor tenant.

== See also ==
- List of shopping malls in Lithuania
- List of supermarket chains in Lithuania
