= Čia Market =

Lithuanian supermarket chain

Čia Market, UAB
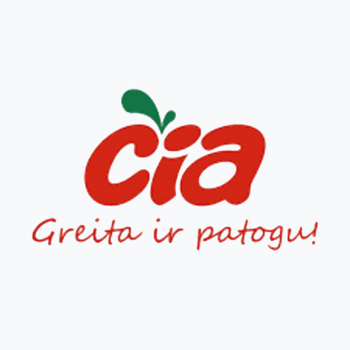
- Native name: Čia Market
- Industry: Retail
- Founded: 1996
- Headquarters: Telšiai, Lithuania
- Area served: Lithuania
- Key people: CEO Aurelijus Vaitiekus
- Revenue: ▲€48.148 million (2023)
- Operating income: ▲€0.024 million (2023)
- Net income: ▲€0.010 million (2023)
- Total assets: ▼€4.422 million (2023)
- Total equity: ▼ - €0.472 million (2023)
- Number of employees: 561 (2022)
- Website: www.ciamarket.lt

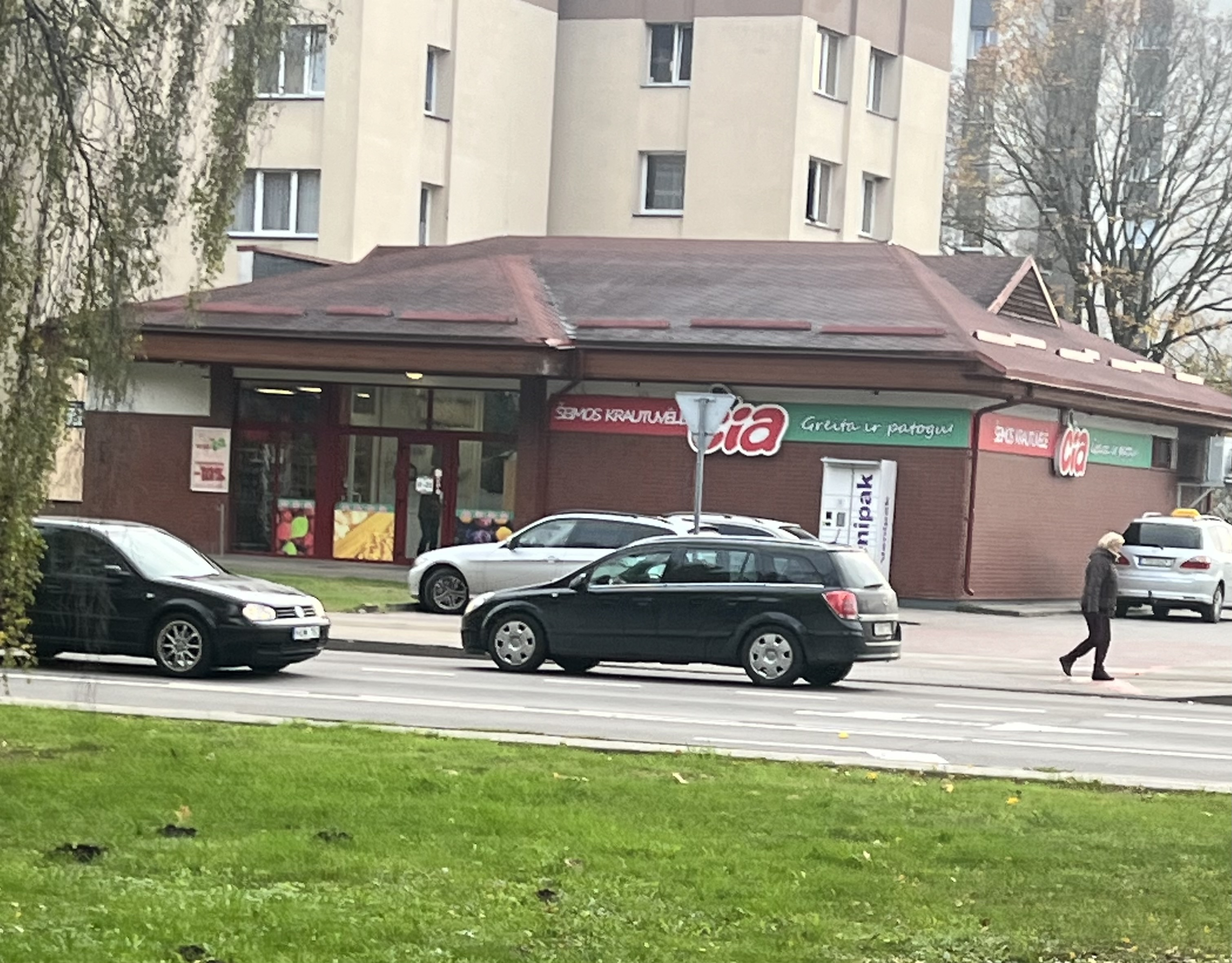
Čia Market shop in Druskininkai

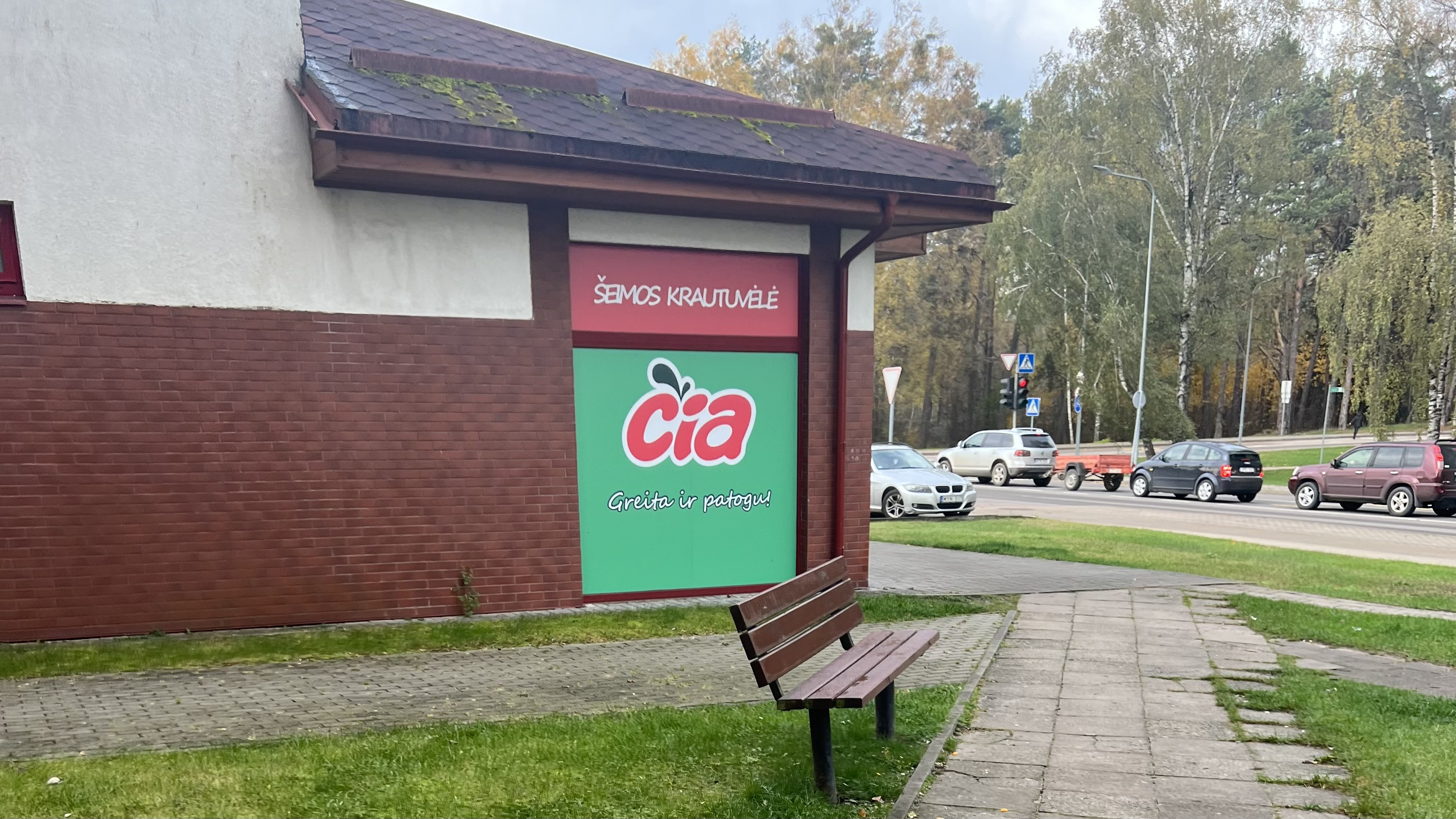
Čia Market from side

Čia Market is a supermarket chain in Lithuania. In 2022, it was 10th largest chain of retail stores in Lithuania.

In 2018, company had around €0.9 million in financial loses while having around €54 million in turnover.

In 2019, the employees of the Čia Market shop in Panevėžys could not stand any longer and complained to the food quality inspectors about the possible large-scale cheating of customers. Some of the products were expired for 2 years.

In 2020, due to financial losses the company closed 24 shops.

In 2022 company expected to reach €48 million in revenue.

== History ==
UAB "Čia Market" is a company from Samogitia region. At first it was named "Žemaitijos prekyba" and it only was selling dairy products. In 2011 the company changed its name to "Čia Market".

== See also ==
- List of supermarket chains in Lithuania
