= Aldik =

Former Polish supermarket chain

Aldik Sp. z o.o.
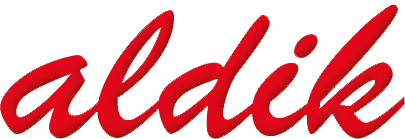
- Company type: Sp. z o.o.
- Industry: Retail
- Founded: 1991; 35 years ago
- Founders: Jadwiga Radzikowska
- Defunct: 2018
- Headquarters: Lublin, Poland
- Area served: Poland
- Operating income: zl 203.75 million
- Net income: zl 139.49 million
- Parent: Maxima Group
- Website: aldik.pl

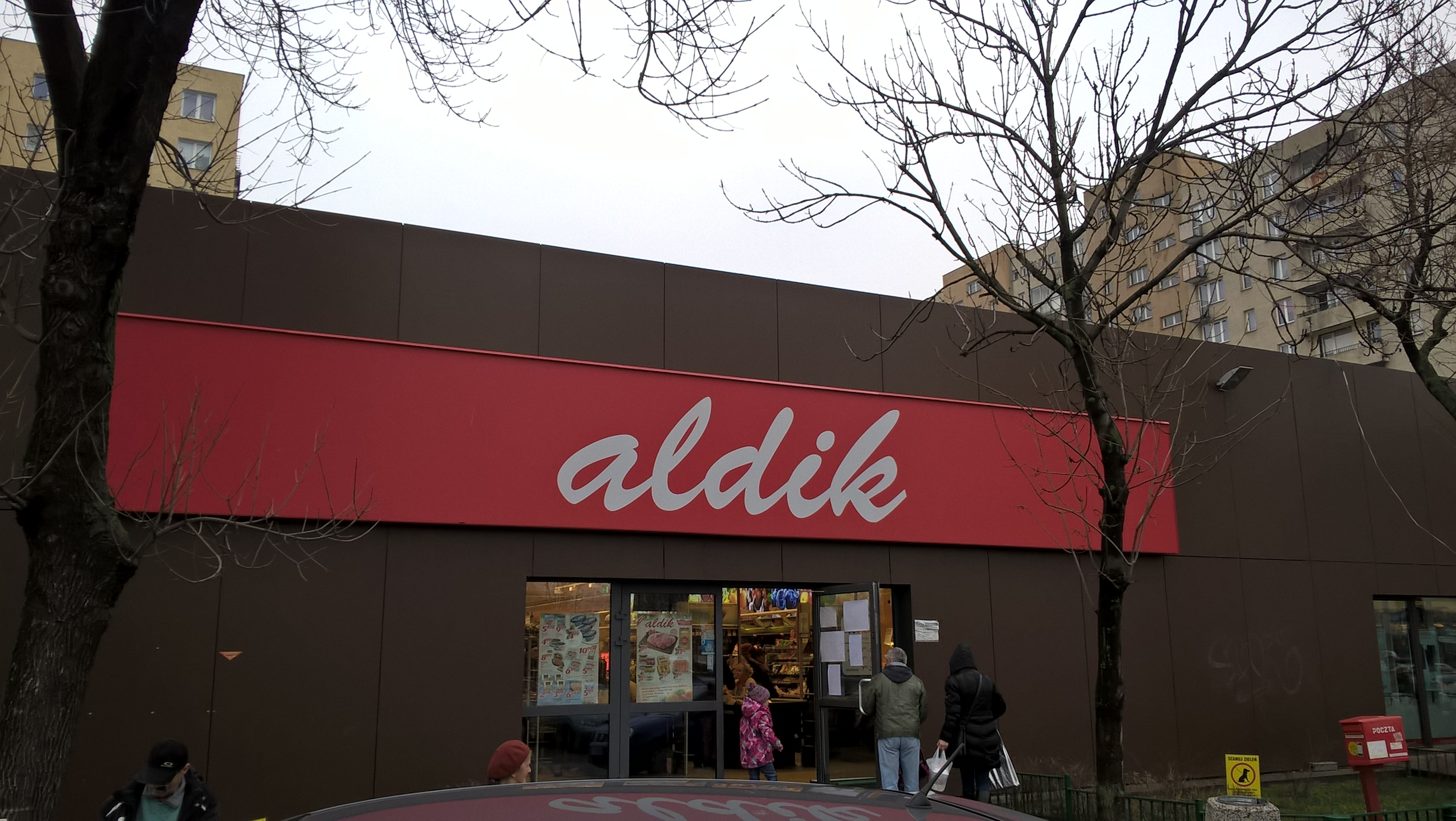
A former Aldik location in Warsaw

Aldik was a regional retail chain of grocery supermarkets located in the Lublin and Masovian Voivodeship. The headquarters of the supermarket is located in Lublin.

The Aldik retail chain company held and operated the regional Lublin bakery "7 zbóż".

== History ==
The retail chain was founded in 1991. During the first six years of the retail chain, the company opened up six new stores in the city of Lublin. In 1997, the company chose to expand outwards and to other towns in the Lublin Voivodeship, with new stores also having been opened in Rzeszów and Stalowa Wola. Due to the expansion of the company, Aldik opened its own logistics and distribution centre in Niedrzwica Duża.

In 2012, the retail chain was acquired by Maxima Group, a joint-stock company, belonging to the Lithuanian capital group owner Nerijus Numavičius. The company operates 30 supermarket stores across the Lublin and Masovian Voivodeship.

In 2015, Aldik Nova published its economic report, denoting the company's revenue increased by 18.9% from the previous year, with an operating income of 44.8 million Euro. In May 2017, the company stated it will begin a profound renovation and modernisation of its retail stores.
