= List of supermarket chains in Lithuania =

This is a list of supermarket chains in Lithuania.

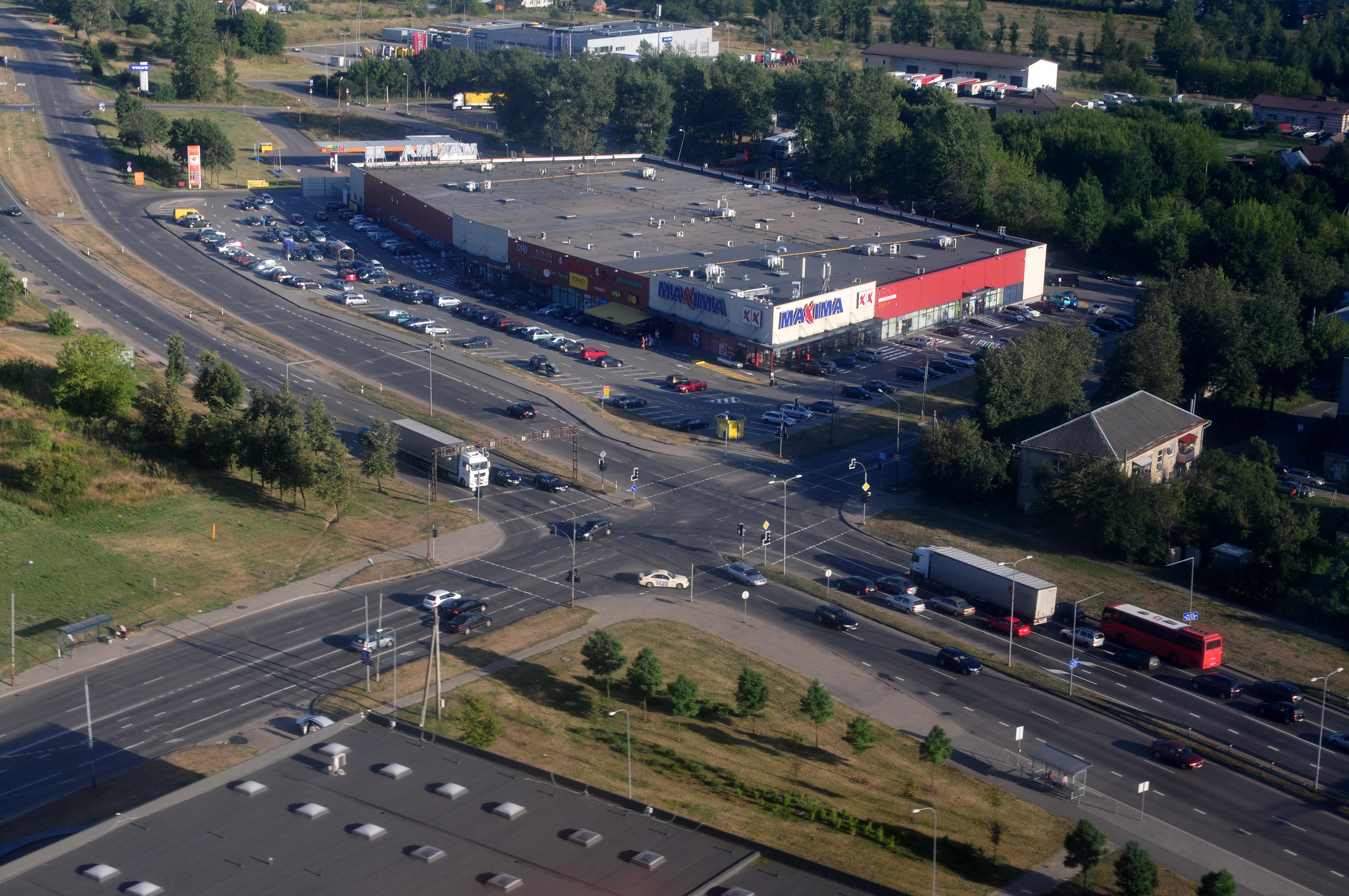
Maxima is the largest supermarket chain in Lithuania

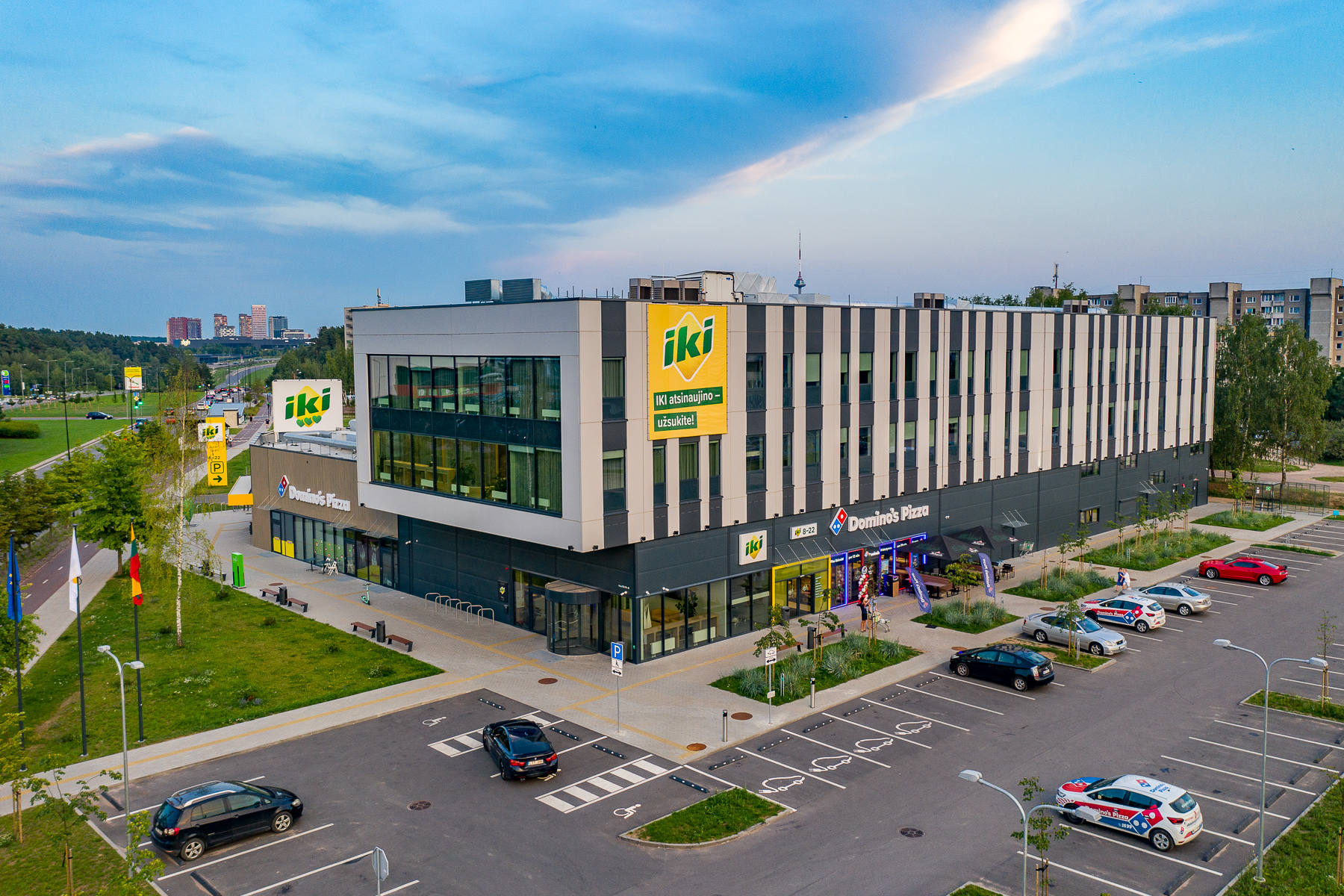
Iki is the second largest supermarket chain in Lithuania

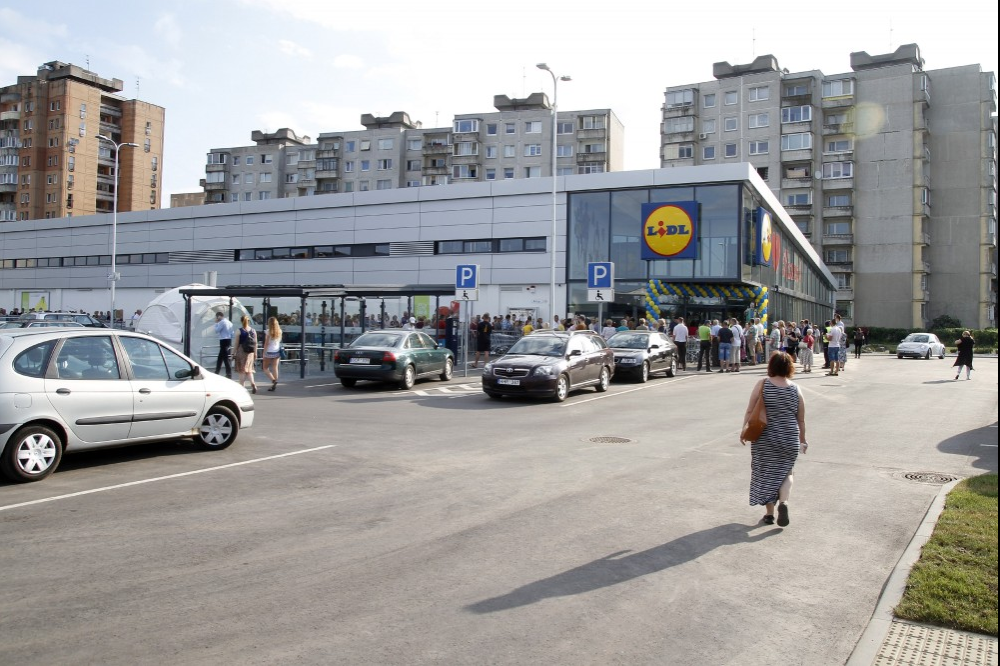
Lidl is the third largest supermarket chain in Lithuania

Name	Stores	Parent	Revenue (2023)
Maxima	251	Maxima Group, UAB	€2,143 million
Iki	231	REWE Group	€888 million
Lidl	80	Schwarz Gruppe	€871 million
Norfa	158	Norfos Mažmena, UAB	€784 million
Rimi	90	Salling Group	€453 million
Aibė	712	Aljansas AIBĖ, UAB	€221 million
Vynoteka	91	Gelsva, UAB	€131 million
Šilas	28	Eiginta, UAB	€90 million
Koops		Vilniaus kooperacijos prekyba, UAB	€52 million
Narvesen	45	Reitan	€58 million
Čia Market	106	Čia Market, UAB	€48 million

== See also ==
- Companies of NASDAQ OMX Vilnius

== Former operations ==
- CBA (ceased operation in 2015)
- Fresh Market (ceased operation in 2015)
- Prisma (chain store) (ceased operation in 2017)
- Supernetto (ceased operation in 2012)
- Spar (retailer) (ceased operation in 2002)
