= Stokrotka =

Polish supermarket chain

- Company type: Limited liability company
- Industry: Retail Store
- Founded: 1994
- Headquarters: Lublin, Poland
- Key people: Dariusz Kalinowski
- Revenue: €1.739 billion (2023)
- Net income: −4,300,000 euro (2018)
- Number of employees: 8,743 (2018)
- Parent: Maxima Group

Stokrotka (lit. Bellis) is a Lithuanian-owned Polish supermarket chain. It is a retail part of the Emperia Capital Group, coordinated by Emperia Holding SA with its registered office in Warsaw. It was listed since 2002 on the Warsaw Stock Exchange.

== Operations ==
The company was founded in 1994 in Lublin. The first retail outlet of this network began its operation in 1996 in Łęczna near Lublin. In terms of the number of stores, Stokrotka is one of the largest retail chains in Poland. In 2014, Stokrotka Sp. z o.o. became the operator of over 410 Stokrotka supermarkets. The chain store has approximately 7,500 employees.

In 2013, Stokrotka launched its own logistics network, the purpose of which is to supply Stokrotka stores with goods. The logistics network consists of the central warehouse in Teresin near Warsaw, 9 regional warehouses and the vehicle fleet.

In November 2017, Maxima Group signed a $338 million investment agreement on the acquisition of Stokrotka.

The transaction was completed on April 18, with Maxima acquiring 93.66% of Emperia's capital share. In July 2018, it was announced that Aldik stores belonging to Maxima Grupė will be added to the Stokrotka store network, and they will continue to operate under the Stokrotka brand.

== Gallery ==
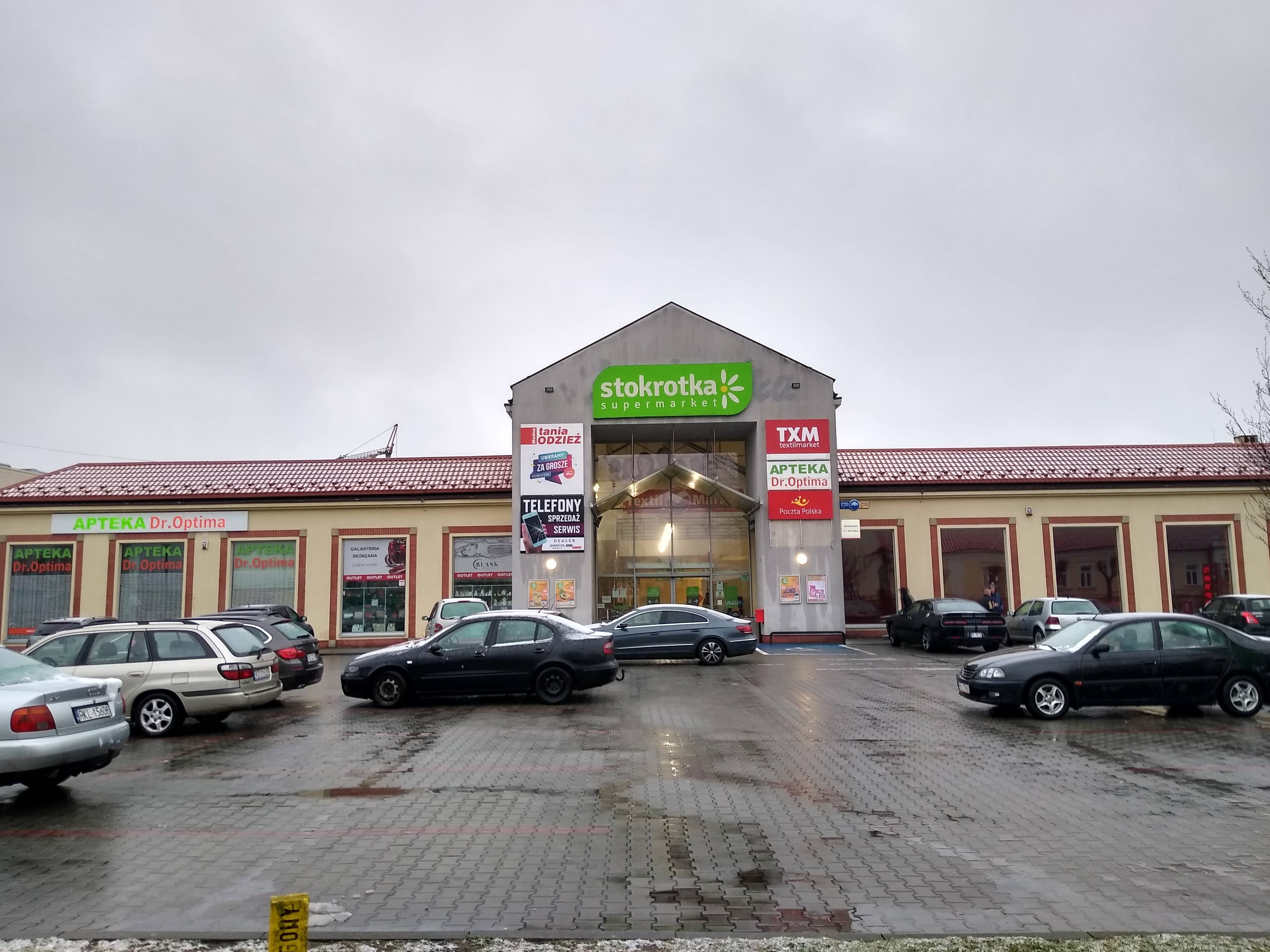
A Stokrotka store in Kolbuszowa

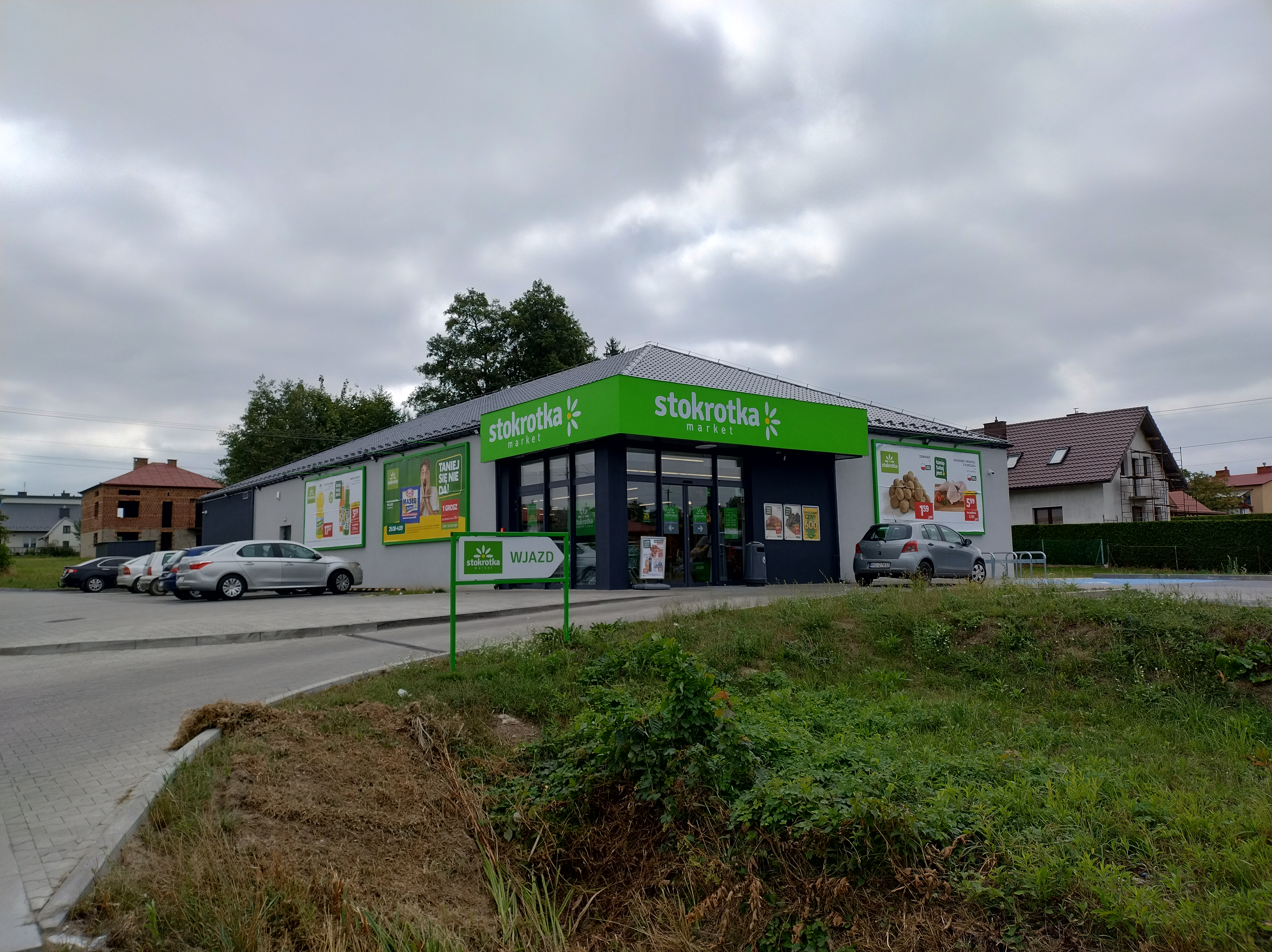
A Stokrotka store in Widełka

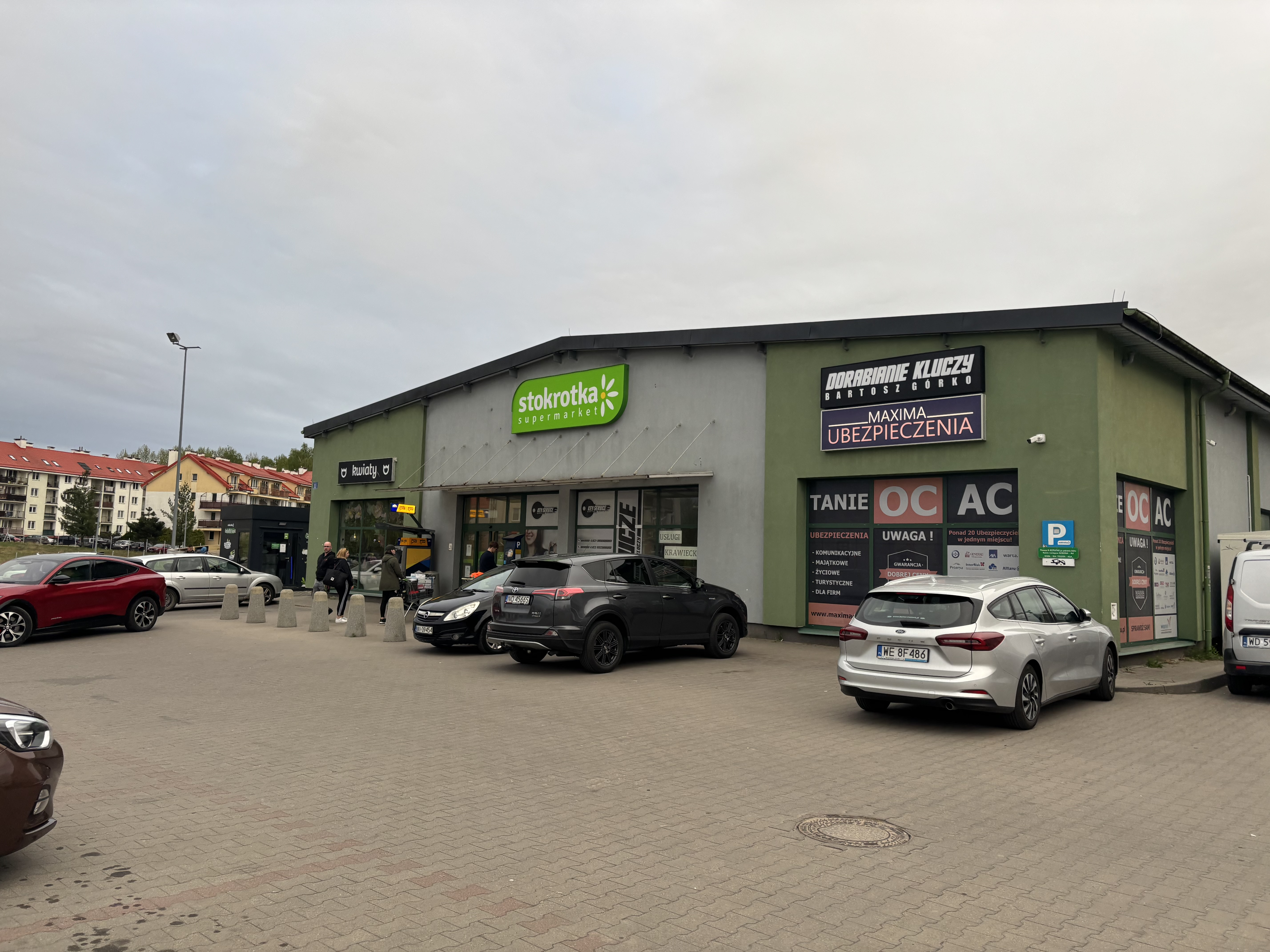
A Stokrotka store in Olsztyn

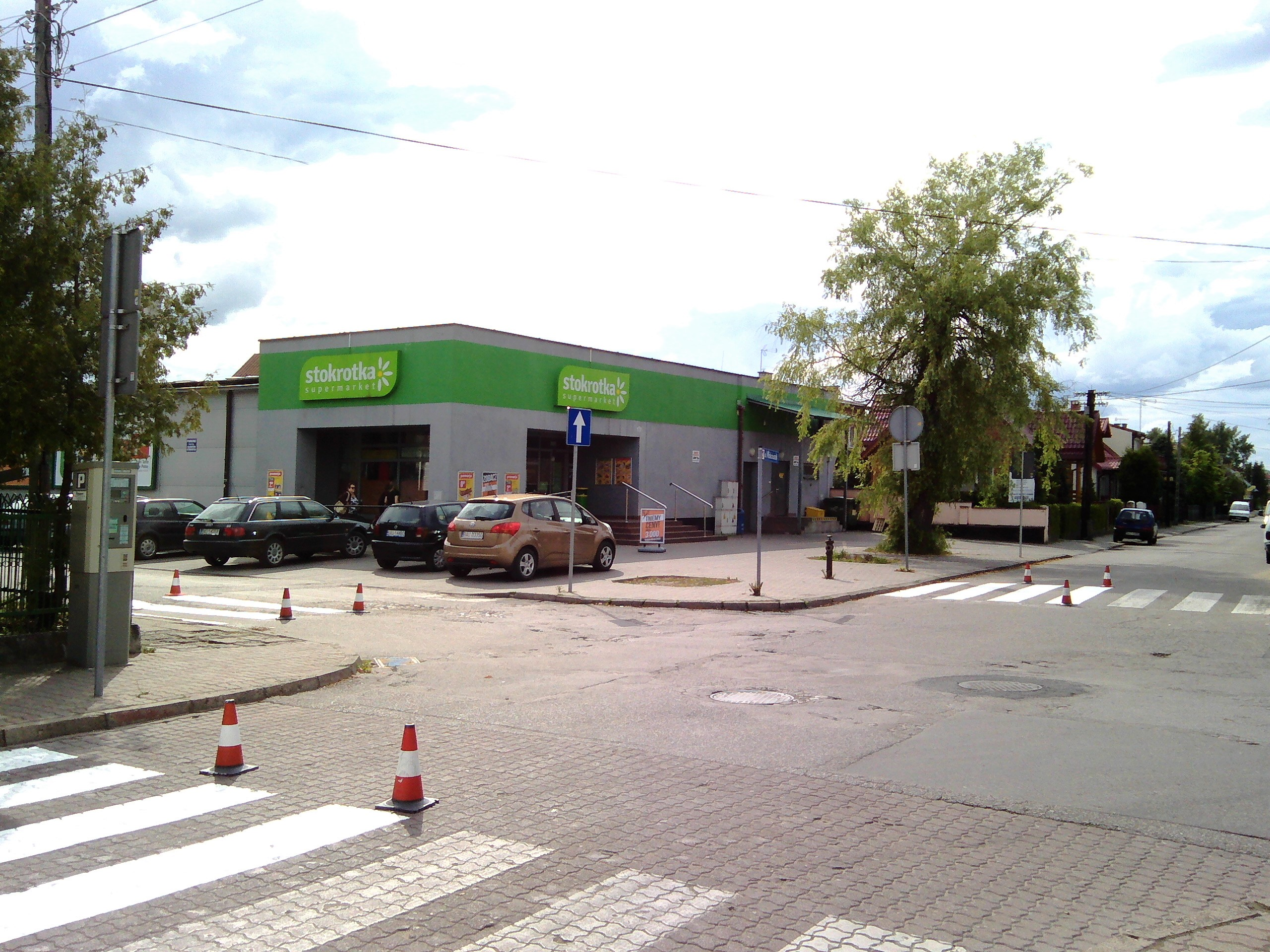
A Stokrotka store in Augustów

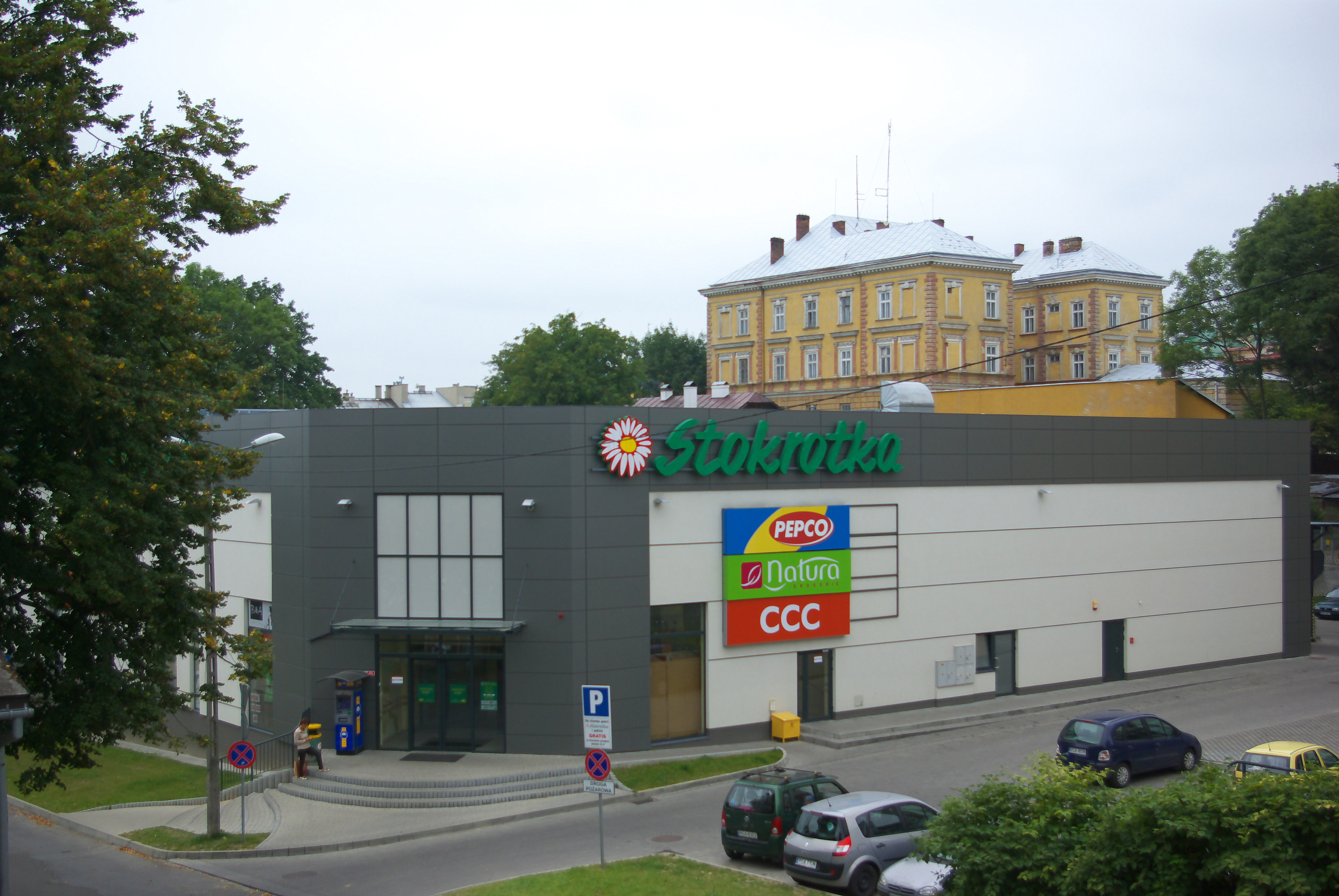
A Stokrotka store in Sanok

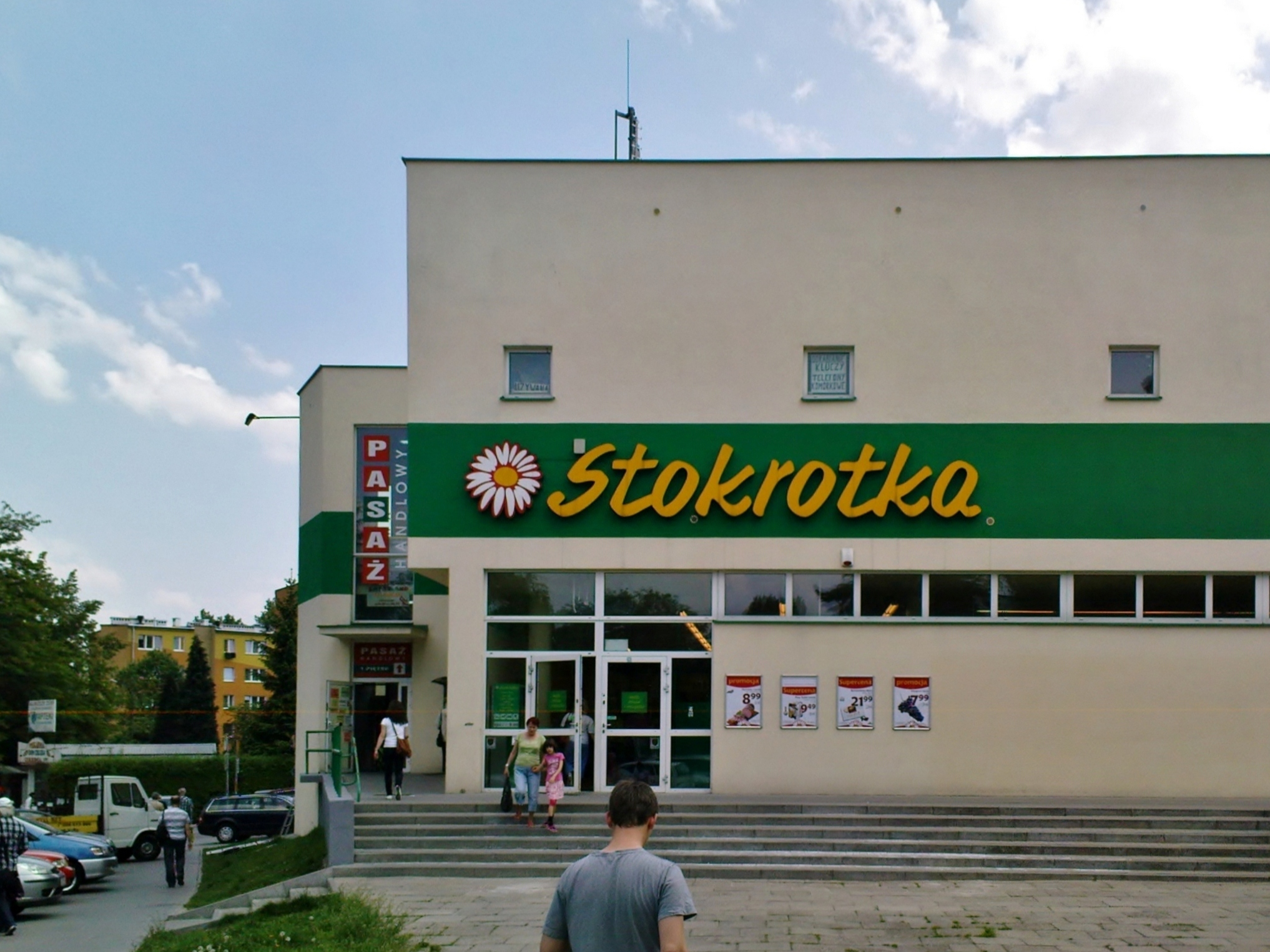
A Stokrotka store in Kraków
