= Vynoteka =

Lithuanian supermarket chain

Gelsva, UAB
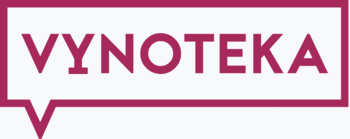
- Industry: Retail, Drink industry
- Founded: April 23, 1991
- Headquarters: Vilnius, Lithuania
- Area served: Lithuania, Latvia and Poland
- Key people: CEO Aurelija Gumbrevičienė
- Revenue: ▲€131.1 million (2023)
- Operating income: €3.5 million
- Net income: €2.85 million
- Total assets: €29.77 million
- Total equity: €17.40 million
- Number of employees: 628 (2024)
- Divisions: SIA „Gelsva“
- Website: www.gelsva.lt

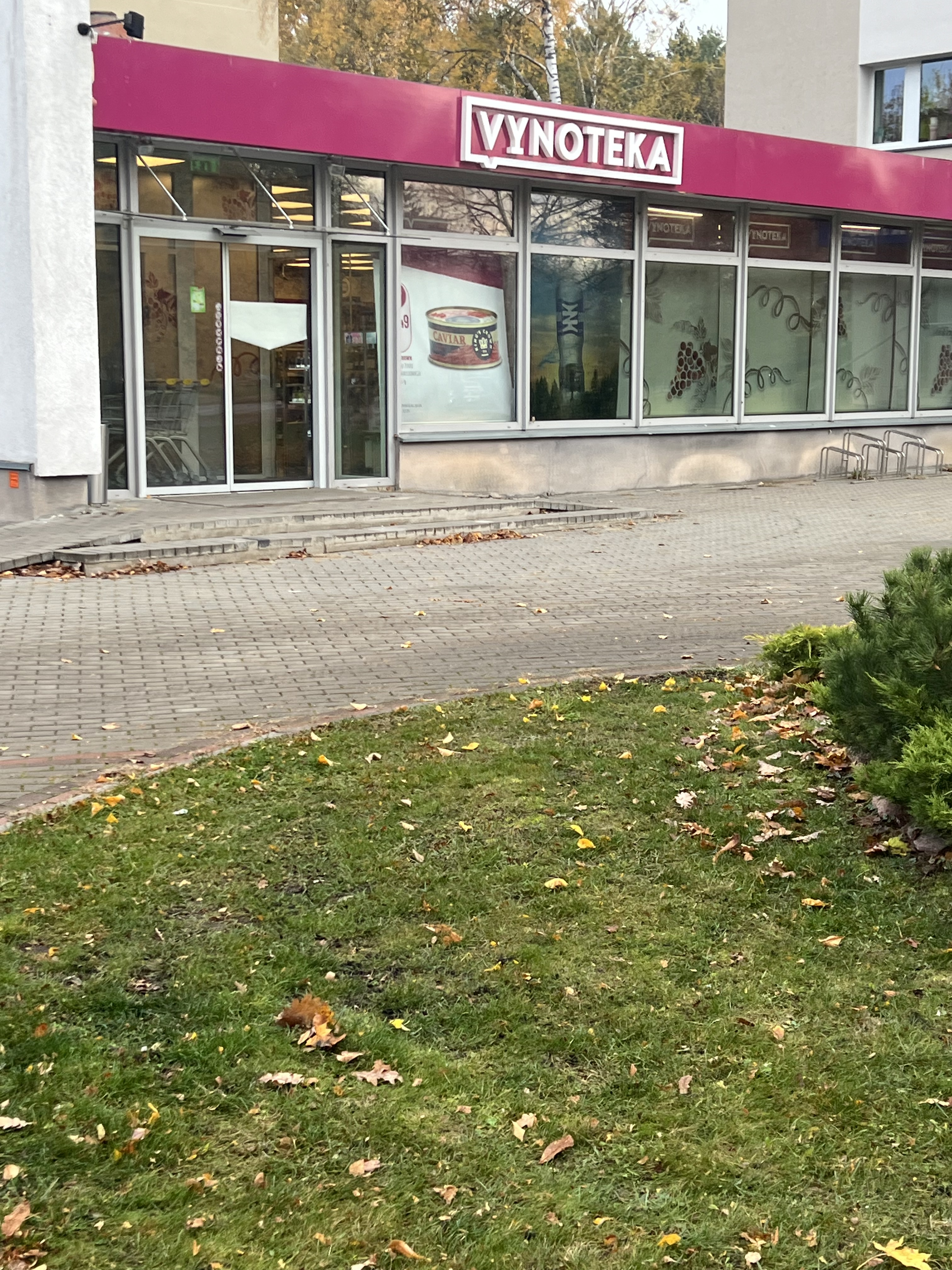
Vynoteka in Druskininkai

Gelsva, UAB is a vertically integrated drinks company in Lithuania. The company is popularly referred to as Vynoteka after their supermarket brand of liquor stores operated in Lithuania, Latvia and Poland spaning 91 stores. As of 2022, it is the 7th largest chain of retail stores in Lithuania.

The company also manufactures Žalia Giria branded bottled water, soft and alcoholic drinks.

== Vynoteka ==
Inside it stores the chain sells around 1,500 brands of wine and 200 various beer brands.

Largest Vynoteka store is located in Kaunas.

In 2022, due to sanctions on Russia Vynoteka stopped sales of imported Russian beverages.

== History ==
In 1991, Gelsva, UAB company was opened.

In 2001, the company started producing mineral water "Žalia Giria".

In 2005, the first Vynoteka shop was opened in Lithuania.

In 2010, the first Vynoteka shop was opened in Poland.

In 2012, the first Vynoteka shop was opened in Latvia.

In 2020, an online shop was launched.

== See also ==
- List of supermarket chains in Lithuania
