= Aibė =

Lithuanian supermarket chain

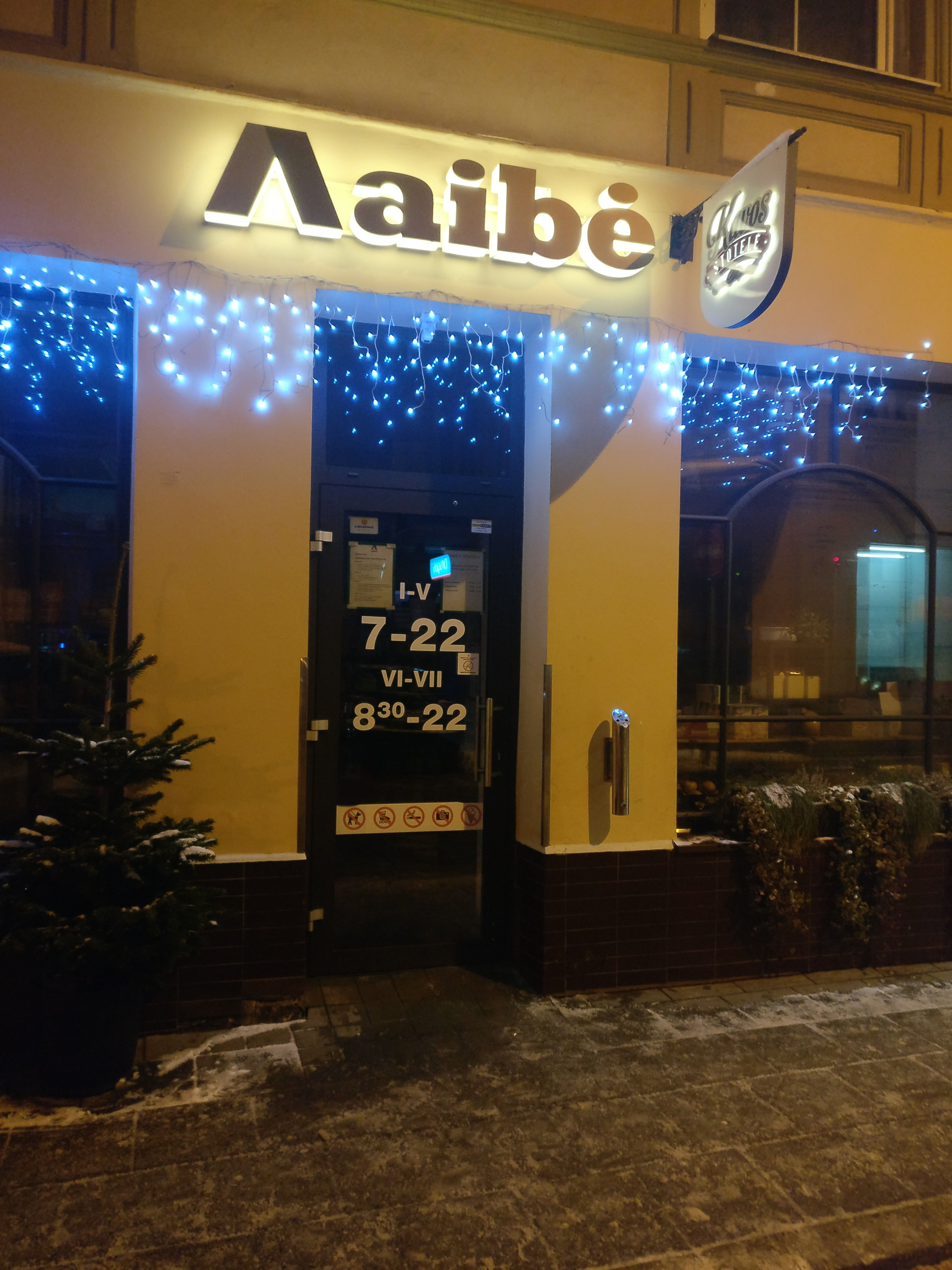
- Aibė shop in Lithuania (2018)
- Native name: Aibė
- Industry: Retail
- Founded: 1999
- Headquarters: Vilnius, Lithuania
- Area served: Lithuania, Latvia
- Key people: CEO Renatas Vaitkevičius
- Revenue: ▲€221.421 million (2022)
- Operating income: €8.057 million (2022)
- Net income: €6.294 million (2022)
- Total assets: €60.611 million (2022)
- Total equity: €54.235 million (2022)
- Parent: Aljansas AIBĖ, UAB
- Website: aibe.lt

Aibė is a supermarket chain in Lithuania. In 2022, it was the sixth largest chain of retail stores in Lithuania.

Aibė has been operating since 1999. Currently there are 1,400 stores in Lithuania and Latvia combined.

In 2023, Aibė was accused of selling Russian and Belarusian products in its stores.

In 2023, Aibė opened its first house building, home repairing and improvement store.

In May 2023, Aibė shop in Vilnius District Municipality was caught on fire.

== History ==
In 1999, the first supermarket was opened in Lithuania.

In 2011, the company changed its interior style.

In 2002, the company expanded to Latvia.

In 2022, the combined turnover of its Lithuanian and Latvian stores reached €700 million.

== See also ==
- List of supermarket chains in Lithuania
