= Maxima Group =

Lithuanian multinational grocery and general merchandise retailer

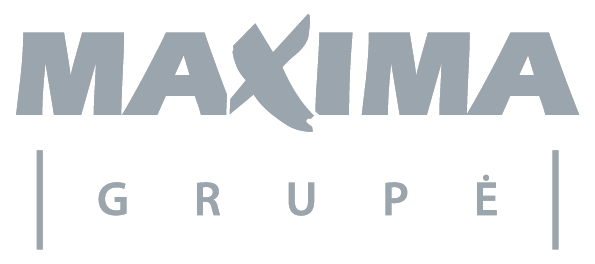
- Maxima Group logo

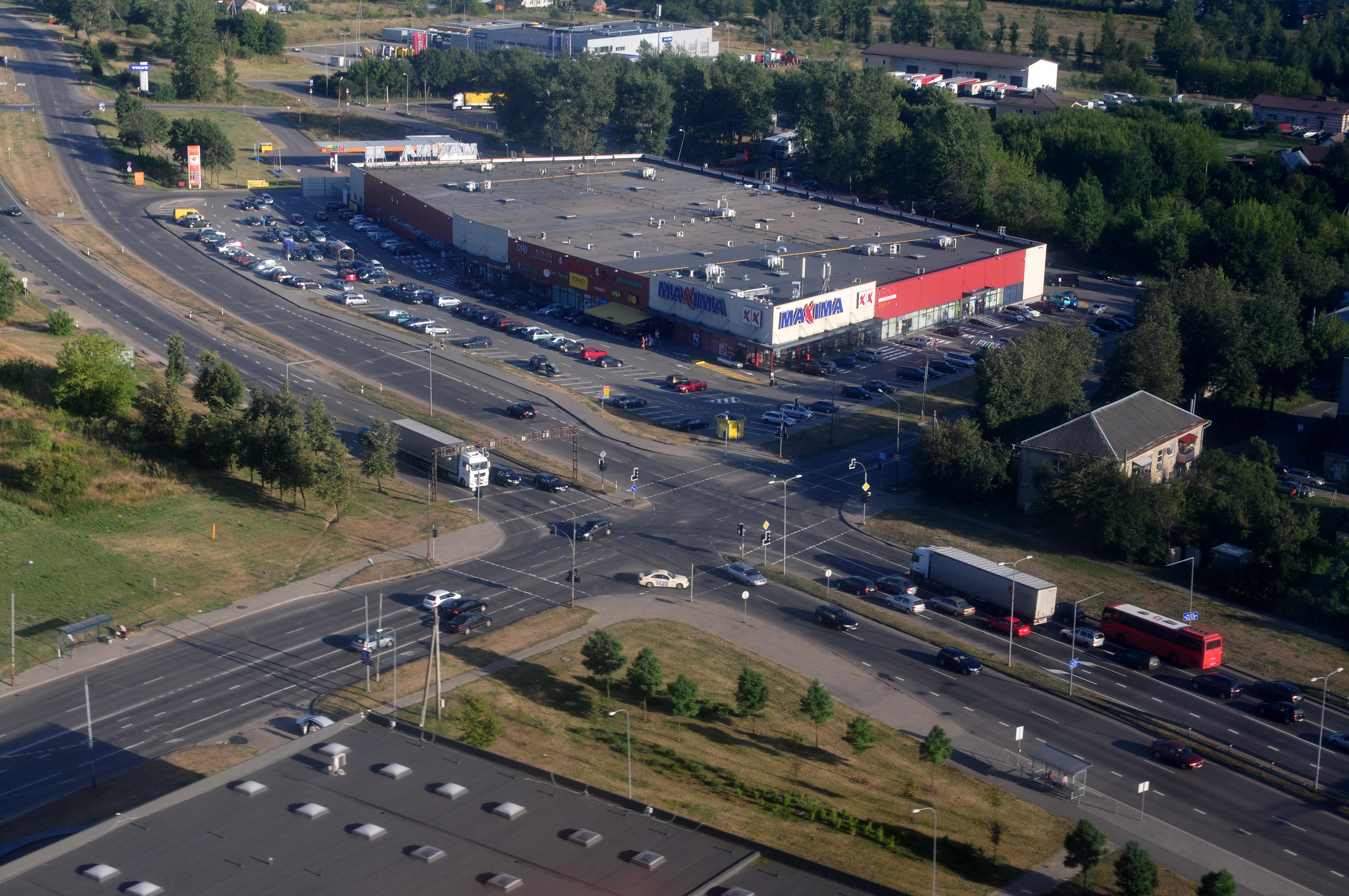
- Exterior of a Maxima store in Vilnius
- Type: Private
- Industry: Holding company, Retail, general merchandise
- Founded: 1992; 34 years ago in Vilnius
- Headquarters: Vilnius, Lithuania
- Area served: Baltics
- Key people: Jolanta Bivainytė, CEO
- Products: Groceries, consumer goods
- Revenue: ▲€6.35 billion (2025)
- Net income: 49,290,000 euro (2020)
- Total assets: 2,200,790,000 euro (2020)
- Number of employees: 21,595 (2025)
- Parent: Vilniaus Prekyba UAB
- Subsidiaries: UAB Maxima LT; Maxima Latvija SIA; Maxima Eesti OÜ; RADAS UAB; Franmax UAB
- Website: maximagrupe.eu/en

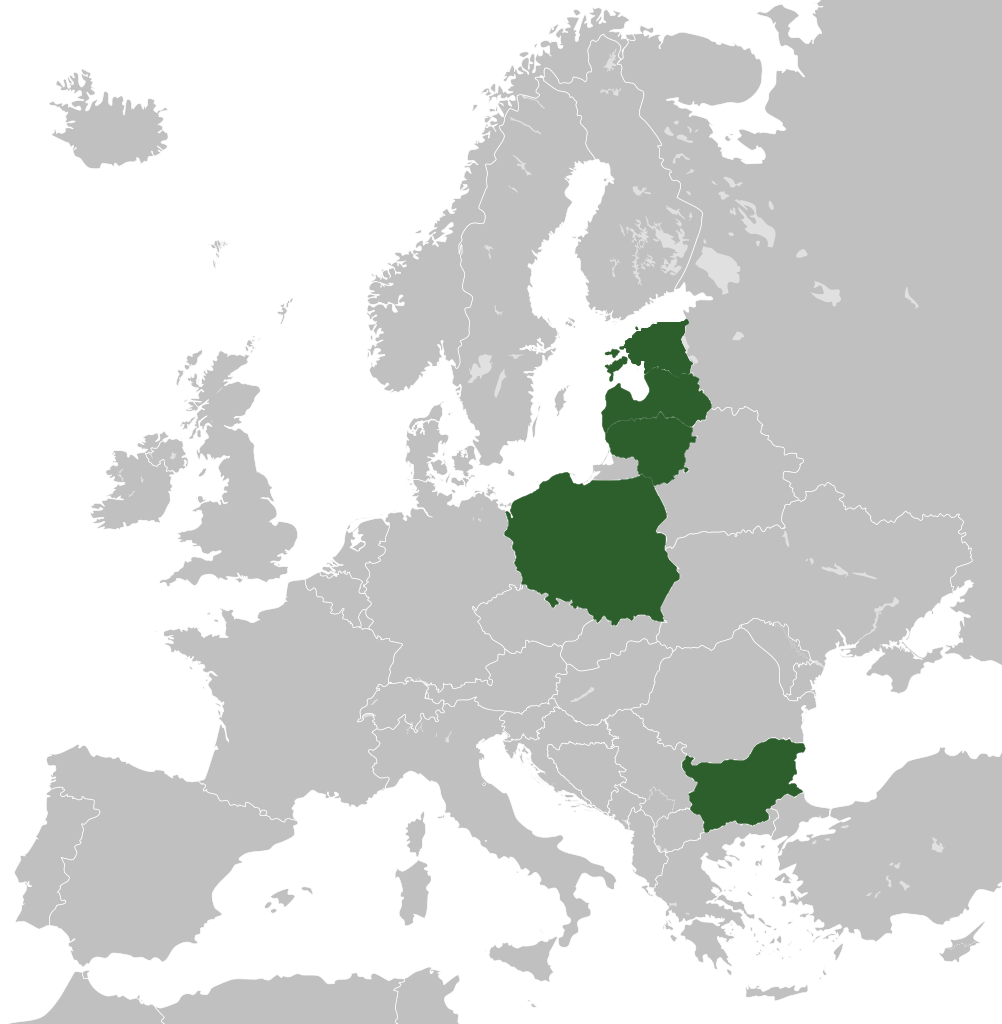
Maxima locations in Europe

MAXIMA GRUPĖ, UAB (Maxima Group) is the largest Lithuanian retail business operating in Lithuania, Latvia and Estonia. The Group operates approximately 500 "Maxima" stores across the Baltic states as well as e-commerce store "Barbora".

Until the end of 2025, the Group also owned T Market in Bulgaria and Stokrotka in Poland. Barbora discontinued its operations in Poland in 2024.

== History ==
Three stores with different names were opened in Vilnius in 1992. The first Maxima store was opened in 1998.

In 2000, the retail chain entered the Latvian and Estonian markets.

In 2007, the holding company MAXIMA GRUPĖ, UAB was established.

At the end of 2011, Maxima Group bought the Aldik supermarket chain in Poland with 24 stores.

Between 2012 and 2020, Maxima also operated a division in Spain, under the names SuperSol (supermarkets) and Cash Diplo (Cash & Carry). It mainly operated in Madrid and Andalusia. It was acquired in 2012 to the DinoSol group, and SuperSol was sold in 2020 to Carrefour, while Cash Diplo was subject to a corporate takeover in 2021.

On November 21, 2013, a collapse happened at a Maxima XX supermarket in Riga, which led to the Zolitude tragedy. 54 people lost their lives and dozens more were injured.

In 2017, the MAXIMA GRUPĖ acquired RADAS, the company managing the online grocery store "Barbora".

In 2018, MAXIMA GRUPĖ acquired "Emperia Holding", the company managing the "Stokrotka" retail chain in Poland, for EUR 276 million.

In 2019, "Aldik" and "Stokrotka" retail chains are merged and continue to operate under one name, "Stokrotka".

=== Maxima Group CEO's ===
- 2007-2008: Gintaras Marcinkevičius
- 2008–2014: Mindaugas Bagdonavičius
- 2014–2016: Neringa Janavičiūtė
- 2016–2017: Alvydas Šustikas
- 2017-2018: Robertas Čipkus
- 2018-2019: Dalius Misiūnas
- 2019-2020: Jolanta Bivainytė
- 2020-2022: Mantas Kuncaitis
- 2022-2025: Manfredas Dargužis
- 2025-now: Jolanta Bivainytė

== Statistics ==
At the end of 2025, the Group covered approximately 29.7% of the Lithuanian, 25.5% of the Latvian, 15.2% of the Estonian, 2.5% of the Polish, and 2.4% of the Bulgarian retail markets.

	Bulgaria	Estonia	Latvia	Lithuania	Poland	Total
Total number of stores (2025)	138	86	171	241	974	1,610
Number of employees (2025)		3,000	6,184	12,411		21,595
Profit (mil. €) (2023)	18.6	40.4	100.7	207.7	116.3	479.0
Revenue (bil. €) (2025)	0.302	0.601	1.136	2.329	1.971	6.339

=== Maxima LT ===
Maxima LT is the largest part of Maxima Group. Maxima stores in Lithuania hold 30% of the total retail market. In 2011, GILD Bankers announced that Maxima Group was the most valuable company. Maxima LT employs 12,704 people (as of December 2023), and operates 246 stores.

=== Aldik ===
Maxima Group operated in Poland under the name of Aldik, to 2018, when these stores started changing to Stokrotka after Maxima Group became main shareholder of Poland's EMPERIA HOLDING S.A. which operates the Stokrotka name.

=== SuperSol ===
The Spanish supermarket chain SuperSol was owned by Maxima between 2012 and 2020. The supermarket had a presence in the Madrid province (including Ávila, Guadalajara and Toledo in the metropolitan area) and Southern Spain (Andalusia, Extremadura, Ceuta and Melilla).

This Spanish arm also included Cash Diplo as a Cash & Carry division. Cash Diplo was subject to a corporate takeover in 2021.

== Scandals ==
On 21 November 2013, the roof of a Maxima supermarket in the Zolitūde neighbourhood of Riga, Latvia, collapsed during peak shopping hours, causing one of the deadliest disasters in the country’s modern history. The collapse resulted in the deaths of 54 people, including three rescue workers, and injured at least 41 others. The building, which had opened only a year earlier, was undergoing construction work on a planned rooftop garden at the time of the incident. Subsequent investigations identified serious design and construction deficiencies as contributing factors. In later legal proceedings, several individuals involved in the building’s design and construction were tried, though no representatives of the Maxima retail company were ultimately held criminally liable, a result that drew public criticism and debate.

== Gallery ==
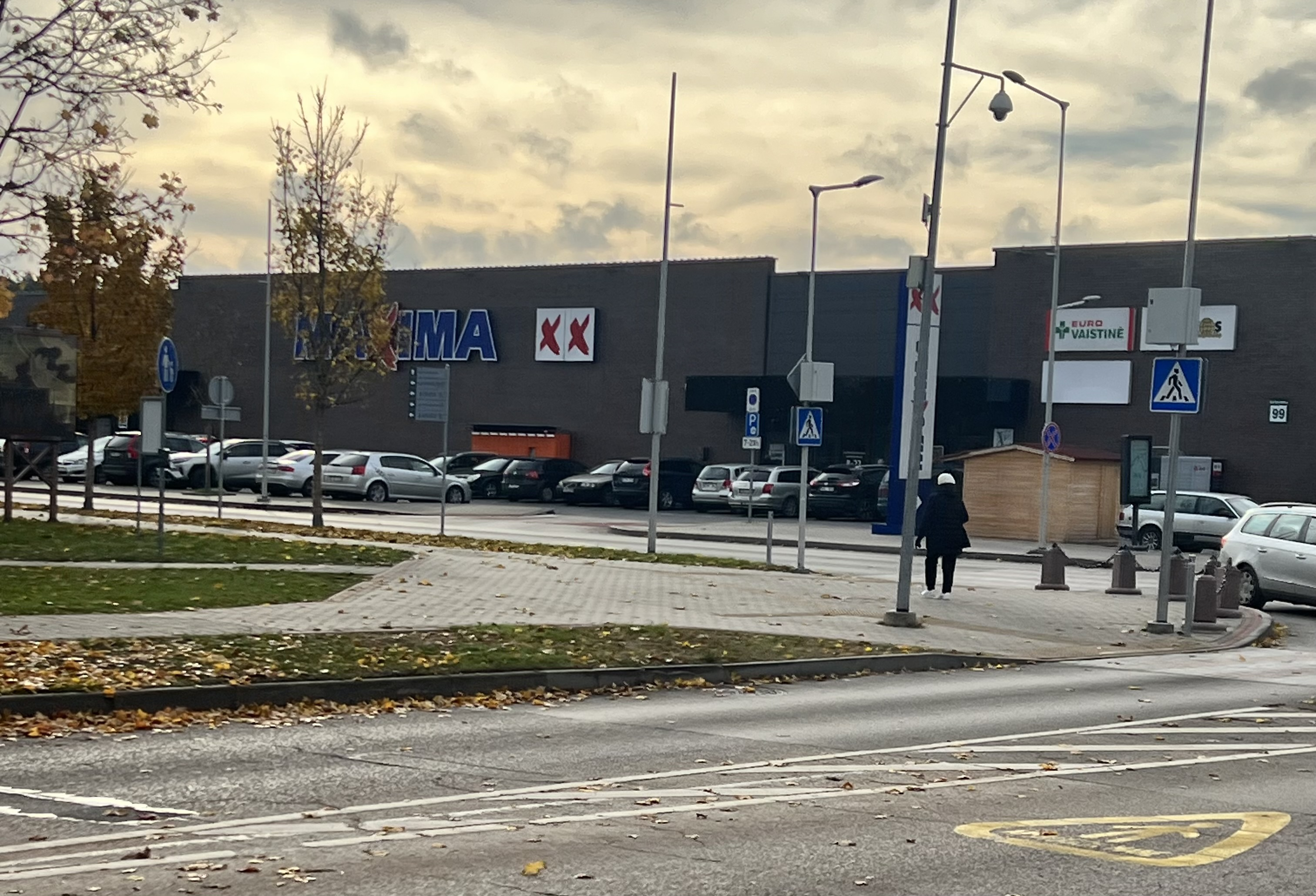
Maxima store in Druskininkai (XX size)

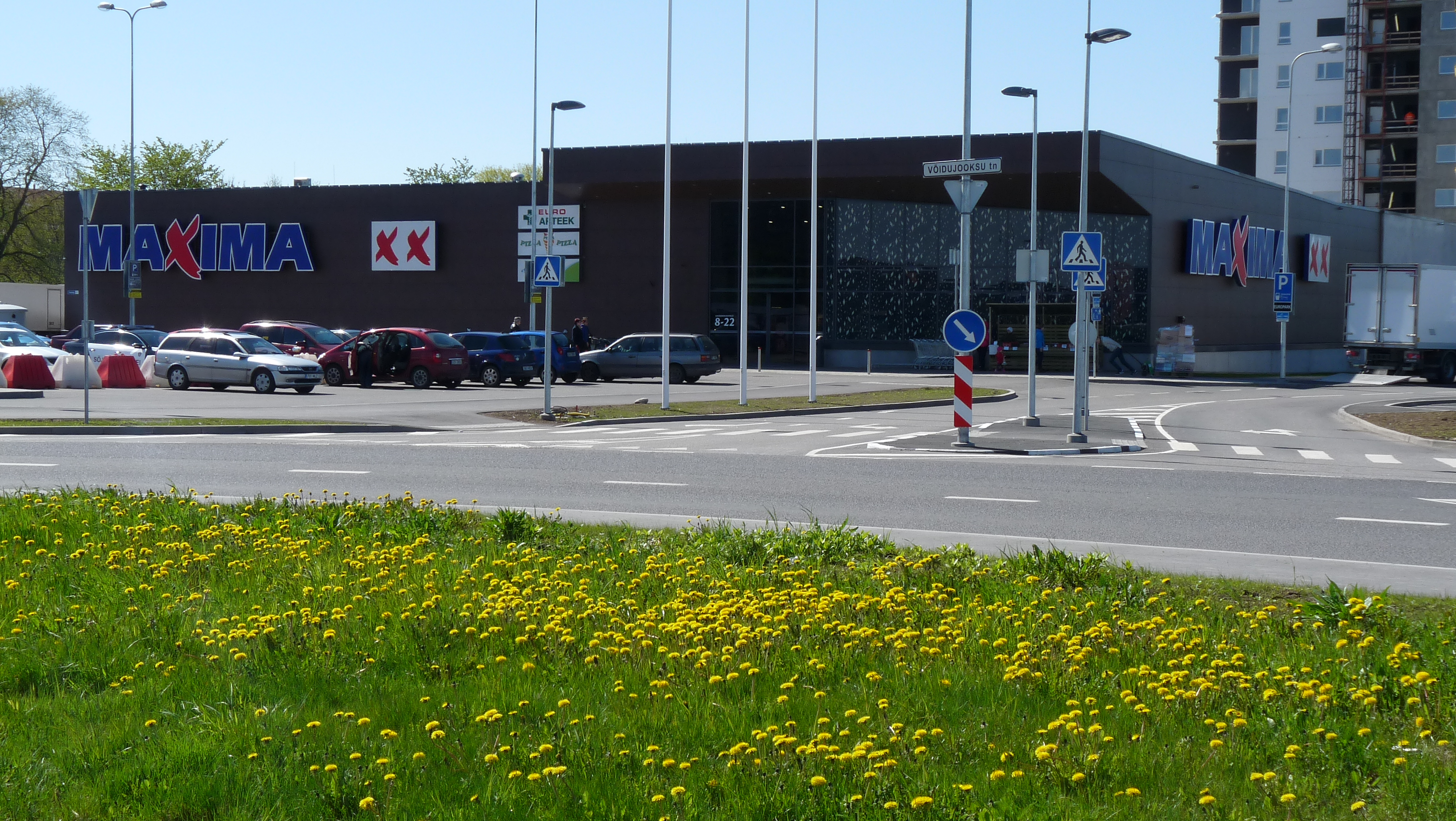
Maxima store in Tallinn (XX size)

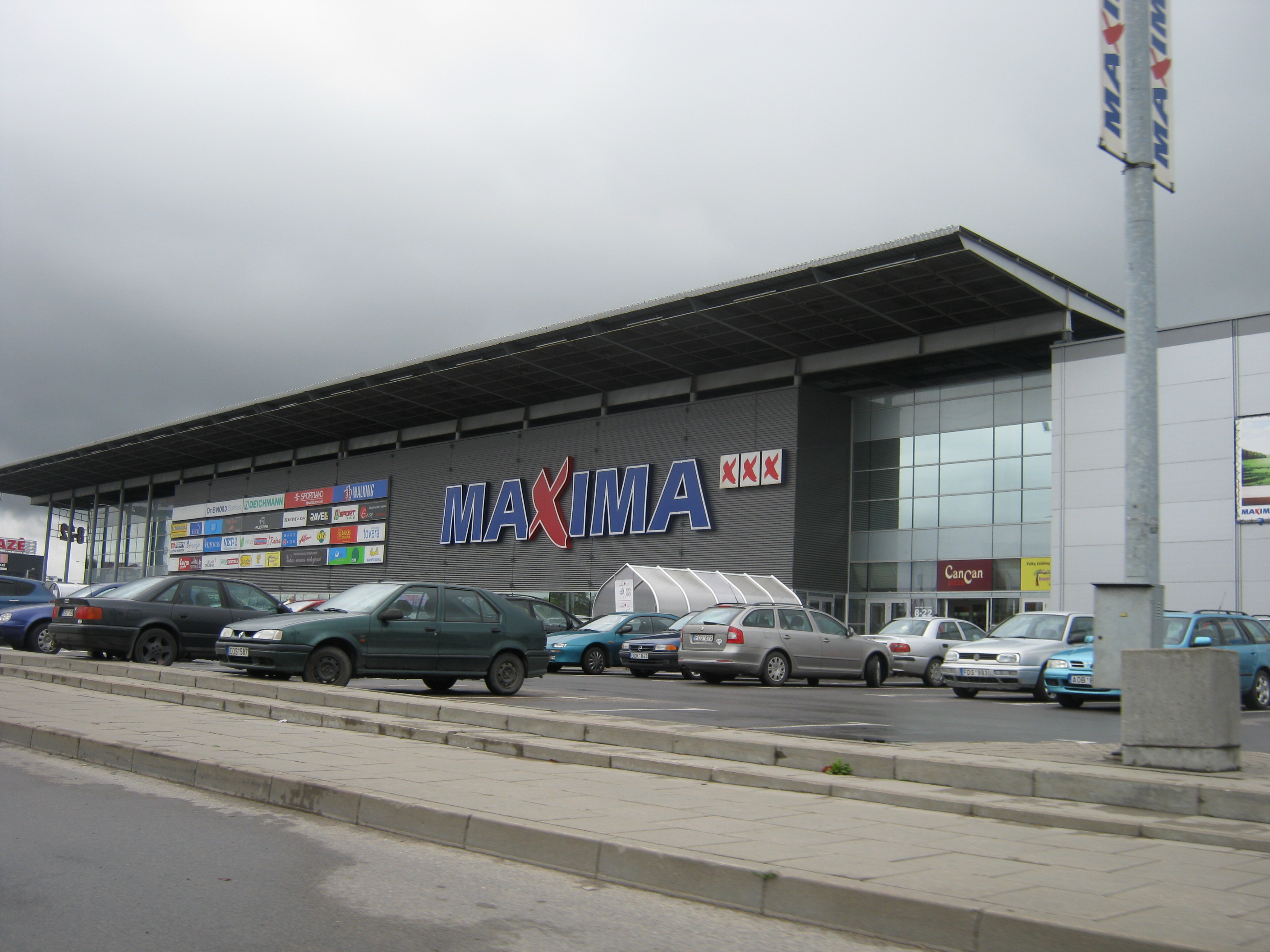
Maxima store in Kaunas (XXX size)

== See also ==
- List of supermarkets
- List of shopping malls in Lithuania
- List of supermarket chains in Lithuania
- Zolitūde shopping centre roof collapse
