= IKI Lietuva =

Lithuanian supermarket chain

IKI Lietuva, UAB

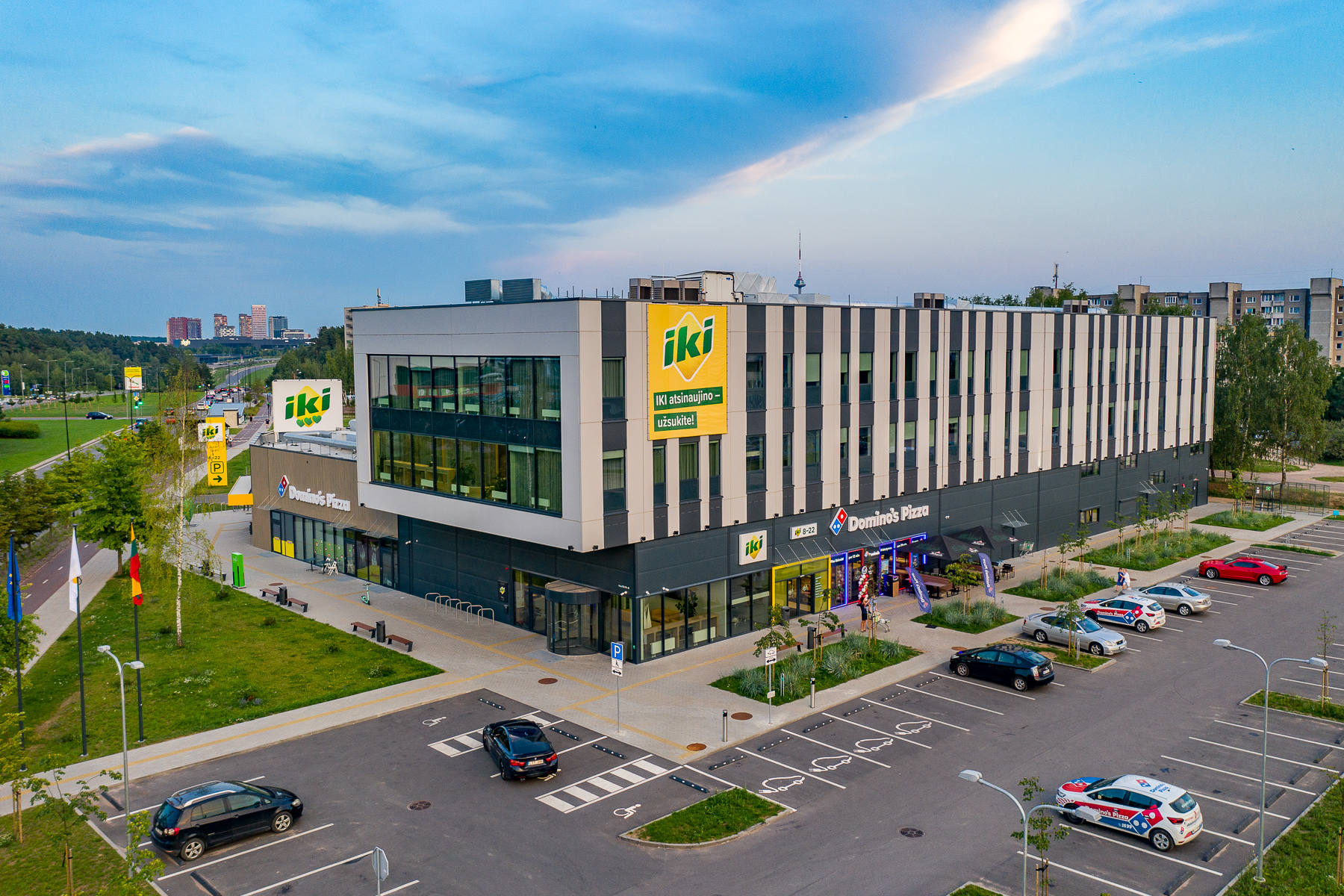
- Central bureau in Pilaitė, Vilnius
- Trade name: IKI
- Industry: Retail
- Founded: 1992
- Founder: George Ortiz, Nicolas Ortiz, Oliver Ortiz
- Headquarters: Pilaitės pr. 42, LT-06222 Vilnius, Lithuania
- Area served: Lithuania
- Key people: Nijolė Kvietkauskaitė (CEO)
- Products: Supermarket; Convenience shop
- Revenue: €935 million (2024) (US$1.01 billion)
- Net income: €16 million (2024) (US$17.32 million)
- Total assets: €105 million (2024) (US$113.64 million)
- Total equity: €157 million (2024) (US$169.91 million)
- Number of employees: 6 096 (2022)
- Parent: REWE Group
- Website: iki.lt

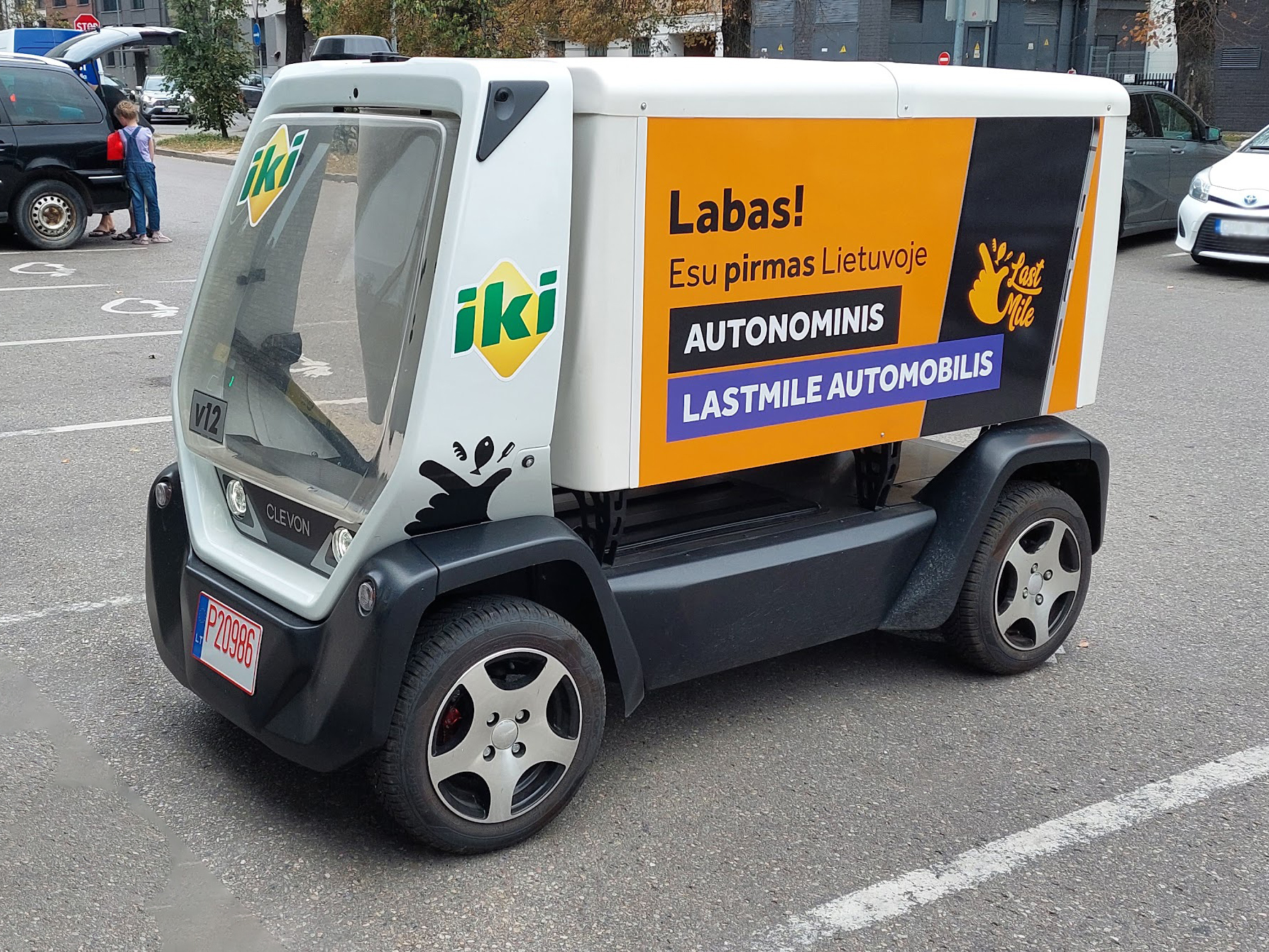
IKI LastMile autonomous car CLEVON (Vilnius, 2023)

IKI Lietuva, formerly known as Palink is the operator of the "IKI" supermarket chain and the "LastMile" delivery service in Lithuania.

== History ==
Palink was founded by Belgian brothers George, Oliver and Nicolas Ortiz. The first store was opened in 1992 in Vilnius, Lithuania.

In 2005, Palink opened its first store in Riga, Latvia.

In 2014, Palink sold all IKI stores in Latvia (51 stores) to local company Mego, stating that Palink is not interested in investing in Latvia anymore. IKI was 5th largest supermarket chain in Latvia.

The company currently operates over 240 "Iki", "Iki Cento" and "Iki Express" stores in more than 70 cities and is the second-largest retail grocer in Lithuania.

In 2016, the Iki Cento brand of stores was discontinued.

In mid-March 2018, Rimi Lietuva submitted nominations of potential buyers to the Competition Council. The council did not support them, on the grounds that these buyers "would not provide stable and at least as effective competition" as the current company provides until the transaction is implemented. In April, the Competition Council announced that the sale of Iki to Rimi was terminated.

In July 2018, the German company REWE increased its stake in Palink to 93.75% of the capital. The second owner was E. Leclerc group Unilec.

In 2021, Palink made acquisition of the "LastMile" delivery service.

Palink was renamed to IKI Lietuva on 2 September 2022.

== See also ==
- List of supermarket chains in Lithuania
