= List of Lithuanians by net worth =

The following list of Lithuanians by net worth is based on wealth and assets compiled and published by Alfa.lt and Top 500 as of November 2022. According to TOP magazine, Gediminas Žiemelis is the richest Lithuanian with EUR 2.45B in assets.

== Table ==
| Ranking | Name | Citizenship | Net Worth (€) | Sources of Wealth |
|---|---|---|---|---|
| 1 | Gediminas Žiemelis | Lithuania | 2.8 billion | Avia Solutions Group |
| 2 | Mindaugas Raila | Lithuania | 2.4 billion | Willgrow |
| 3 | Nerijus Numa | Lithuania | 2.3 billion | Vp Grupė |
| 4 | Tomas Okmanas | Lithuania | 1.2 billion | Tesonet |
| 4 | Eimantas Sabaliauskas | Lithuania | 1.2 billion | Tesonet |
| 6 | Darius Mockus | Lithuania | 1.02 billion | MG Baltic |
| 7 | Vladas Algirdas Bumelis | Lithuania | 720 mln. | Fermentas, Biotechpharmos |
| 8 | Artūras Rakauskas | Lithuania | 710 mln. | Kesko Senukai |
| 9 | Vitoldas Tomaševskis | Lithuania | 700 mln. | OpenLane Ltd. |
| 10 | Dainius Dundulis | Lithuania | 640 mln. | Norfos Mažmena |
| 11 | Darius Zubas | Lithuania | 550 mln. | Linas Agro Group, Mestilla |
| 12 | Arvydas Paukštys | Lithuania | 530 mln. | Teltonika IoT Group |
| 13 | Sigitas Paulauskas | Lithuania | 460 mln. | VMG Group |
| 14 | Žilvinas Marcinkevičius | Lithuania | 450 mln. | VP Group |
| 15 | Vaidas Barakauskas | Lithuania | 420 mln. | Indeco |
| 16 | Gintaras Staniulis | Lithuania | 340 mln. | Top Sport |
| 17 | Jonas Tučinskas | Lithuania | 340 mln. | Nemuno Banga, Dzūkijos Šilas |
| 18 | Arvydas Avulis | Lithuania | 330 mln. | Hanner |
| 19 | Vilhelmas Germanas | Lithuania | 300 mln. | iSun |
| 20 | Lyda Lubienė | Lithuania | 300 mln. | Achemos grupė |
| 21 | Augustinas Rakauskas | Lithuania | 300 mln. | Kesko Senukai |
| 22 | Stanislawas Michniewiczius | Lithuania | 280 mln. | Sanitex |
| 23 | Jonas Karklys | Lithuania | 270 mln. | Tesonet |
| 24 | Edvardas Liachovičius | Lithuania | 260 mln. | Willgrow |
| 25 | Mindaugas Marcinkevičius | Lithuania | 240 mln. | VP Group |
| 26 | Kęstutis Martinkėnas | Lithuania | 220 mln. | Modus Grupė |
| 27 | Audrius Menkevičius | Lithuania | 215 mln. | Komfovent |
| 28 | Giedrius Baciuška | Lithuania | 210 mln. | GBY |
| 29 | Ramūnas Karbauskis | Lithuania | 210 mln. | Agrokoncernas |
| 30 | Arūnas Martinkevičius | Lithuania | 210 mln. | SBA Koncernas |
| 31 | Ivanas Paleičikas | Lithuania | 210 mln. | Vaizga |
| 32 | Alvydas Banys | Lithuania | 200 mln. | Invaldos INVL |
| 33 | Petras Narbutas | Lithuania | 200 mln. | Narbutas Group |
| 34 | Mindaugas Veselis | Lithuania | 200 mln. | BTL Group |
| 35 | Andrius Zimnickas | Lithuania | 200 mln. | Juodeliai Group |
| 36 | Vladas Numavičius | Lithuania | 180 mln. | VP Group |
| 37 | Raimondas Tovilavičius | Lithuania | 180 mln. | Skubos |
| 38 | Zigmas Petrauskas | Lithuania | 165 mln. | Klaipėdos Terminalo Grupė |
| 39 | Visvaldas Matijošaitis | Lithuania | 160 mln. | Vičiūnai |
| 40 | Andrius Janukonis | Lithuania | 155 mln. | Icor |
| 41 | Rimas Varanauskas | Lithuania | 155 mln. | Freda |
| 42 | Alvydas Barsteiga | Lithuania | 150 mln. | Nemuno Vaistinė, CGP Management |
| 43 | Robertas Dargis | Lithuania | 150 mln. | Eika |
| 44 | Benas Gudelis | Lithuania | 150 mln. | Fragrances International, Lietuvos Rytas |
| 45 | Gintautas Jaugielavičius | Lithuania | 150 mln. | Icor |
| 46 | Vytautas Strioga | Lithuania | 150 mln. | E Energija |
| 47 | Vytas Volkevičius | Lithuania | 140 mln. | Hoptrans |
| 48 | Aidas Plaščinskas | Lithuania | 135 mln. | Finėjas Group |
| 48 | Audrius Zakas | Lithuania | 135 mln. | Finėjas Group |
| 50 | Liudas Skierus | Lithuania | 135 mln. | Vičiūnai, Plungės Kooperatinė Prekyba |
