= Basketball Holding Company =

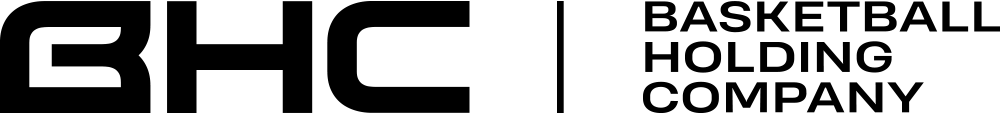
- Company type: Private
- Industry: Sports; Sports services
- Founded: 2022
- Founder: Gediminas Ziemelis
- Headquarters: Vilnius
- Key people: Gediminas Ziemelis; Tom Klein; Justas Pikelis; Jonas Valanciunas; Nikita Sergienko; Ramunas Audzevicius; Jonas Drasutis; Rimantas Kaukenas; Andrius Ziauberis; Rytis Davidovicius; Arif Almeri; Tomas Vaišvila
- Subsidiaries: BC Wolves Twinsbet; Sandstorm Shooters

Basketball Holding Company (BHC) is a sports and entertainment investment company, based in Vilnius. The company manages such clubs as BC Wolves Twinsbet and Sandstrom Shooters. BHC's sports leadership team includes Gediminas Ziemelis, Rimantas Kaukenas, Andrius Ziauberis, Rytis Davidovicius, Arif Almeri and Tomas Vaisvila.

== History ==
The company was founded by a group of investors led by Gediminas Ziemelis, including Thomas Klein, Justas Pikelis, Jonas Valanciunas, Nikita Sergienko, Ramunas Audzevicius, and Jonas Drasutis in 2022. In the same year, BHC also established BC Wolves and entered the team into the top tier of the Lithuanian Basketball League (LKL).

In August 2023, Lithuanian national team captain and NBA player Jonas Valančiūnas became an investor.

In October 2023, BC Wolves secured their first EuroCup victory by defeating Beşiktaş at the Avia Solutions Group Arena in Vilnius.

By November 2023, the organizational and administrative steps to establish a second team, BC Sandstorm Shooters, located in Dubai, UAE, had been finalized.

In April 2024, Twinsbet was announced as the main naming partner for BC Wolves Twinsbet and the renamed Twinsbet Arena, formerly known as the Avia Solutions Group Arena. Operated by the Nese company, Twinsbet appears on the BC Wolves jerseys and the team's home arena.

BHC's key commercial partners include Twinsbet, Boeing, ATLAS, KlasJet, Neo Denta, Avis, the Rimantas Kaukenas Foundation, Aves Aero, etc.

== Clubs & Assets ==
- BC Wolves Twinsbet
- Sandstorm Shooters
- Twinsbet Arena
