= City Service =

- Founded: 2007
- Headquarters: Lithuania
- Parent: UAB ICOR

City Service SE is the main subsidiary company of the Lithuanian group UAB ICOR. The company is active in the Baltic States, having approximately 4,800 employees (2019). Since 2007, City Service SE is listed at NASDAQ OMX Vilnius. In 2011, the company achieved a turnover of 157 million EUR (542.4 million litas).

The board is made up of Andrius Janukonis (chairman), Gintautas Jaugielavičius.
