= BC Wolves =

Basketball team in Vilnius, Lithuania

- Nickname: Vilkai
- Founded: 2022
- Dissolved: 2026
- History: BC Wolves; 2022–2025
- Arena: Twinsbet Arena
- Capacity: 10,800
- Location: Vilnius, Lithuania
- Team colors: Turquoise, black, white
- Ownership: Basketball Holding Company
- Website: www.bcwolves.com
Home	Away

BC Wolves, officially Wolves Twinsbet for sponsorship reasons, was a professional basketball club based in Vilnius, Lithuania. The team competed in the Lithuanian Basketball League (LKL), and played its home games at the 10,800-seat Twinsbet Arena. The Wolves declared bankruptcy in April 2026, after suspending operations in June 2025.

== History ==
The club was founded on 2 June 2022; its name referred to the mythical Iron Wolf in Vilnius' founding legend. Dzūki was dissolved, and the Wolves followed it for the 2022–23 LKL season.

The LKL expanded to 12 teams, and a second basketball club appeared in the capital. The Wolves said that its main objectives were strengthening Lithuanian basketball, attracting solid players, raising the level of LKL competition, and becoming an elite European basketball club. After two years of existence the Wolves reached Europe's second-tier tournament, the EuroCup.

=== 2022–23 season ===
On 5 July 2022, Rimas Kurtinaitis was announced as the club's head coach. The following day, Adas Juškevičius was the first player signed. The Wolves also signed Lithuanian men's national basketball team players Eigirdas Žukauskas and Kristupas Žemaitis, and LKL players such as Regimantas Miniotas, Vitalijus Kozys and Arnas Beručka. Former Rytas player and multiple LKL record-holder Mindaugas Lukauskis was also signed. Marcos Delia became the first foreign player to sign with the team, soon followed by Ahmad Caver. Juan Gomez de Liano was the first Filipino player signed by a European basketball club.

In their first LKL game, the Wolves defeated Nevėžis Kėdainiai on the road 81–76. The club participated in the 2022–23 FIBA Europe Cup qualifying round, its first European competition. The Wolves defeated the Greek Aris Thessaloniki team 88–77 in the first round, but was eliminated in the second round by Bulgarian champion Rilski Sportist 91–76. The club struggled in the LKL, but the signings of Jeffery Taylor and Eric Buckner were thought to help them rise in the standings. The Wolves began a rivalry with Rytas Vilnius and also had competitive matches with long-time LKL champion and EuroLeague participant Žalgiris Kaunas, defeating both teams in February and the beginning of March. The club defeated Eurocup participants Lietkabelis Panevėžys in the regular-season series, which helped them reach third place in the LKL standings. Ahmad Caver was named the LKL regular-season MVP. The late-season signings of Rashard Kelly and Jerai Grant aimed to strengthen the team before the playoffs.

In the King Mindaugas Cup, the Wolves finished second in the qualifying round to Neptūnas Klaipėda. They drew Žalgiris Kaunas for the quarterfinals, who defeated the Wolves at home 95–79 and Kaunas 91–72.

On 28 March 2023, the club fired head coach Kurtinaitis and assistant Aurimas Jasilionis after qualifying for the European North Basketball League (ENBL) final four. The Wolves hired Kęstutis Kemzūra as head coach and Marius Leonavičius and Nedas Pocevičius as assistants.

The club also participated in the 2022–23 European North Basketball League, which began in November 2022. The Wolves defeated Budivelnyk Kyiv in the quarterfinals, qualifying for the final four under Kurtinaitis. Under Kemzūra, the club defeated Wilki Morskie Szczecin 58–55 in the semifinals. In the finals, the Wolves lost to Stal Ostrów Wielkopolski 66–70.

In the LKL playoffs, the club faced CBet Jonava. Although the Wolves won only one regular-season match against CBet, the third-seeded club was heavily favored. CBet won 80–76 in the away series opener, and eliminated the Wolves in Jonava 80–75. Due to the reconstruction of its Avia Solutions Group Arena, the team played some home games in Alytus Arena.

=== 2023–24 season ===
Jeffery Taylor renewed his contract with the club until 2025 on 24 May 2023, with an option for an additional year, joining the remaining core of the team: Adas Juškevičius, Eigirdas Žukauskas, Regimantas Miniotas, Kristupas Žemaitis, Vitalijus Kozys, and Arnas Beručka. The Wolves retained many key players but lost LKL MVP Ahmad Caver, who left the team during the summer. The club signed Rasheed Sulaimon, who became the team leader during pre-season games, to replace Caver. The Wolves signed Tre'Shawn Thurman, Christian Mekowulu (to replace Dellia), and ended the summer by signing Artūrs Žagars and Vaidas Kariniauskas as point guards; Žagars and Kariniauskas had played well for Latvia and Lithuania, their respective national teams, in the 2023 Basketball World Cup. Kariniauskas had been signed by M Basket Mažeikiai, requiring the Wolves to buy him out as the season was about to begin. Đorđe Gagić was signed as the team's main center, but struggled to adjust and was released later in the season. On 17 August 2023, Jonas Valančiūnas joined the club's investors.

The Wolves made their debut in the 2023-2024 edition of the EuroCup. They began the season well overall, losing their first two EuroCup games before winning four of their next five games despite Žagars' serious injury. The club finished the first round with a 4–4 record, fighting for a place in the playoffs. Sulaimon led the team in scoring, with Thurman, Žemaitis, and Kariniauskas also playing well. The Wolves dominated the LKL, defeating BC Žalgiris and city rivals BC Rytas to lead after the first round with a 10–1 record; their lone loss was to fellow EuroCup participant 7-Bet Lietkabelis. The club was among the leaders in attendance in the EuroCup and the LKL.

By December, however, a 68–96 loss against BC Juventus in Utena was followed by a long losing streak in the LKL and the EuroCup; the addition of center Garrison Brooks and the return of Jeffrey Taylor (out for most of the season's first half with an injury) were insufficient to change the team's fortunes. Žalgiris defeated the Wolves to take first place in the LKL, and subsequent losses to Lietkabelis and Rytas dropped the club to fourth place. The Wolves lost seven of their next eight EuroCup games, with losses to Beşiktaş and the Ukrainian Prometey Slobozhanske costing costing them a playoff spot.

The club drew Žalgiris in the 2024 King Mindaugas Cup quarterfinals, losing the first game 95–76 and tying 82–82 in the second to be eliminated on aggregate.

On 21 January 2024, head coach Kemzūra was replaced by assistant coach Nedas Pacevičius; Marius Leonavičius and Mindaugas Brazys, who joined the Wolves from BC Neptūnas, were his assistants. The Wolves improved during the rest of the season, winning three consecutive EuroCup games for an 8–10 record and just missing the playoffs. With the managerial change and Žagars' return, the Wolves won the last eleven of their fourteen LKL games (including wins against Lietkabelis and Žalgiris at home). They finished the LKL regular season in third place with a 22–8 record, just behind Žalgiris and Rytas.

The Wolves won their first LKL playoff game in club history, defeating Neptūnas at home 91–84. Neptūnas won the next game in Klaipėda, 95–76, to set up a deciding match in Vilnius. Žemaitis led the Wolves to a 91–80 victory and their first playoff series. In the semifinals, the club faced city rivals Rytas. They began with a 96–85 victory, but Rytas won the next two games 113-75 and 86–78; both games had a number of incidents between the players, fans, and Rytas head coach Giedrius Žibėnas. The Wolves bounced back with a 97–86 victory to tie the series and set up a deciding game. After they led by double digits early in the first half, Rytas (led by Marcus Foster) won 92–87.

The club then faced Lietkabelis for the bronze medal as the heavy favorite, but Lietkabelis came from behind in Vilnius with an 86–84 victory. The Wolves won in Panevėžys, 81–73, before Lietkabelis won 91–84 in Vilnius. Lietkabelis won the deciding game in Panevėžys, 98–87. Gagić, who signed with Lietkabelis after leaving the Wolves, was the key factor for Lietkabelis, dominating the entire Wolves frontcourt.

=== 2024–25 season ===
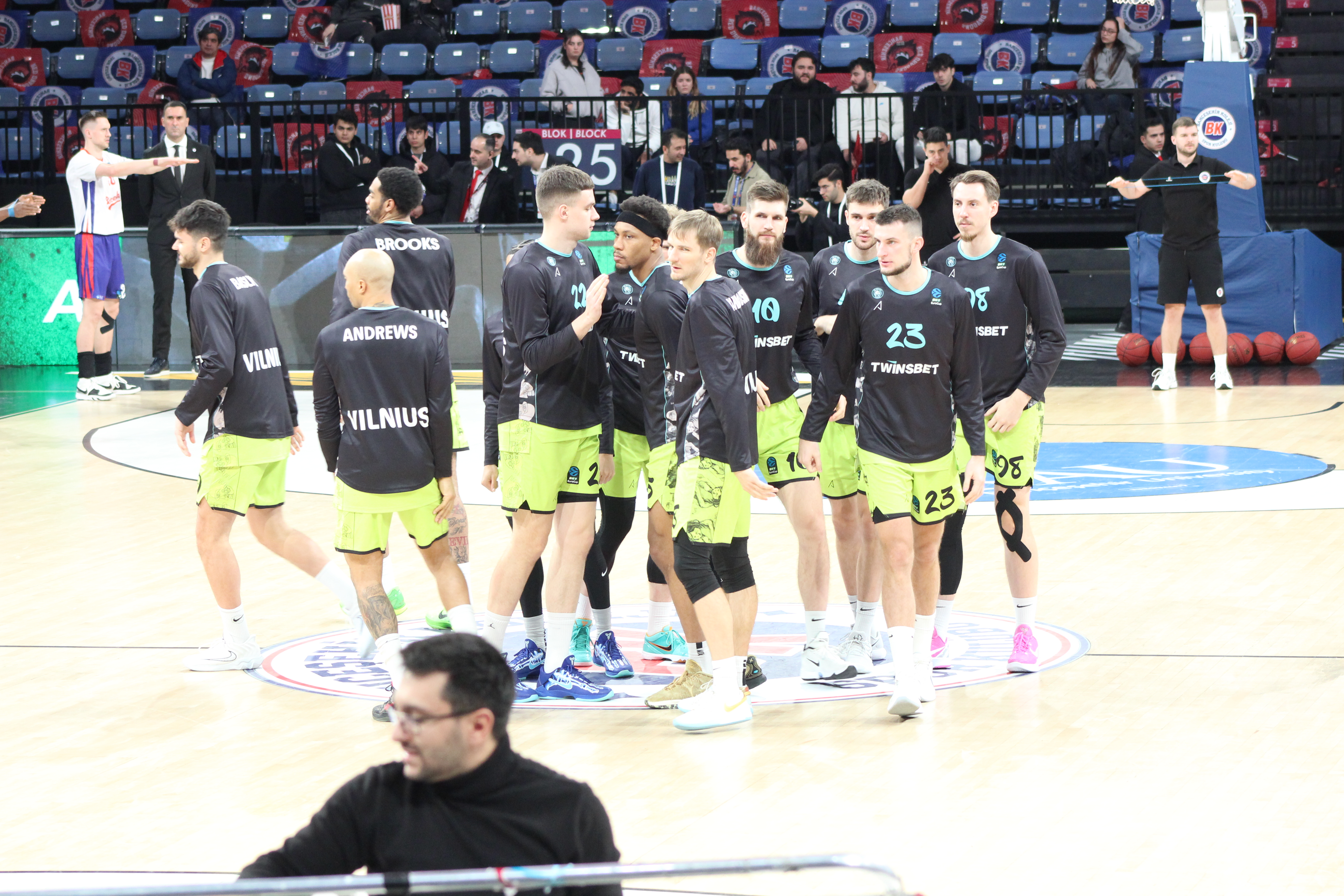
Wolves roster in December 2024

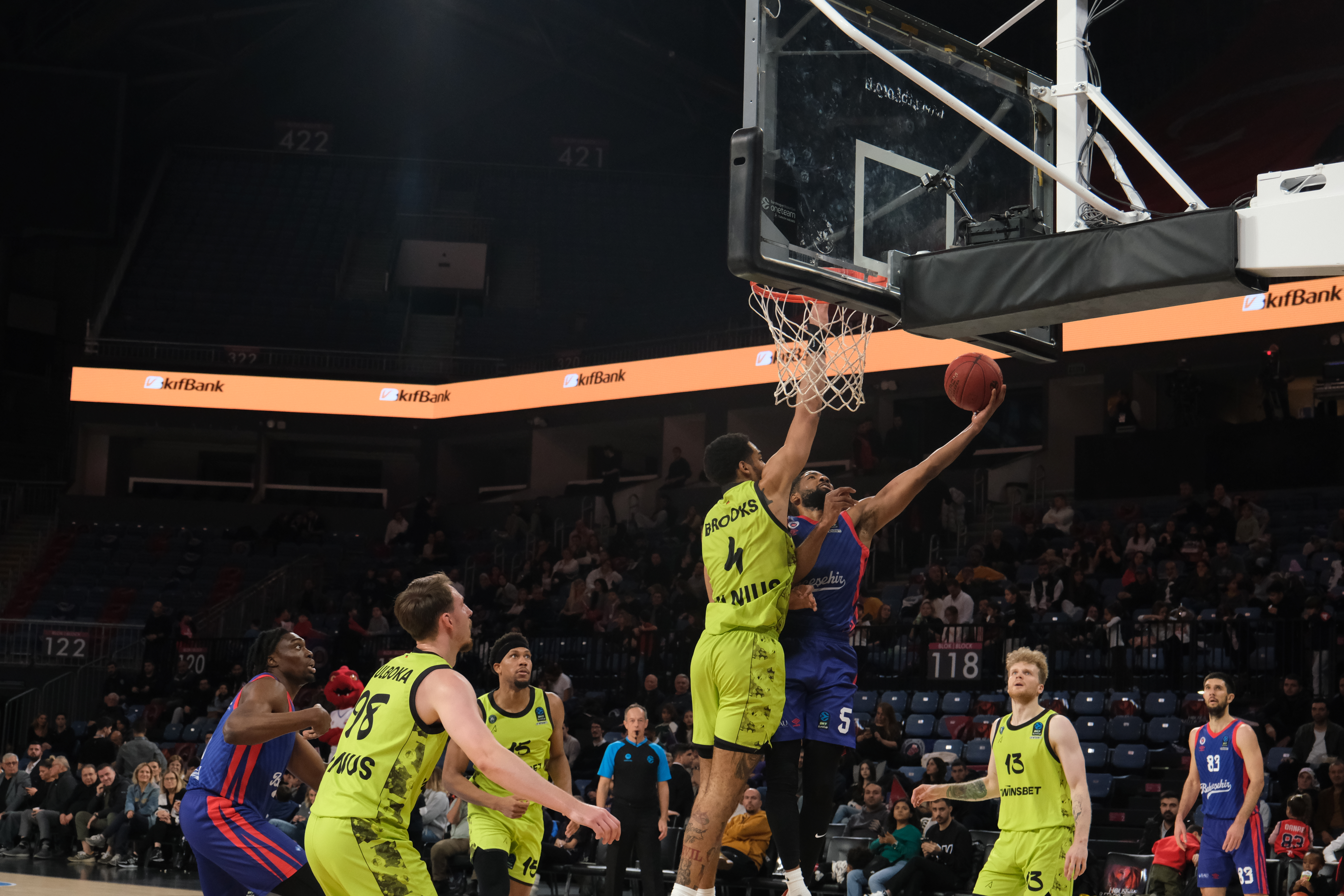
Bahçeşehir–Wolves game in 2024

Alessandro Magro of Germani Basket Brescia was signed as the Wolves' new head coach. Nedas Pocevičius returned to his assistant position with Marius Leonavičius and Mindaugas Brazys. Žukauskas, Juškevičius, Kozys, Beručka, Mekowulu, Žagars and team leader Sulaimon left. The Wolves signed former Joventut Badalona leader Andrew Andrews and Promitheas Patras star Anthony Cowan Jr., as well as Lithuanian players Arnoldas Kulboka, Matas Jogėla, and Marek Blaževič. Thurman, Brooks, Žemaitis, Kariniauskas, Taylor, and team captain Miniotas remained with the team, and the Wolves finished the off-season by signing Daniel Baslyk of BC Šiauliai and Justinas Marcinkevičius of BC Nevėžis. The club earned a wild card for the upcoming EuroCup season.

The Wolves began sluggishly, with an 0-3 EuroCup record and a 2-3 record in the LKL; in the LKL, they lost to BC Lietkabelis and BC Neptūnas. After a team meeting, the club began a five-game EuroCup win streak which included away wins against Juventut Badalona and Dreamland Gran Canaria (dispelling the notion that the Wolves could not win on the road). They defeated heavily-favored Hapoel Tel Aviv at home 104-100, the Turkish Beşiktaş team, Joventut Badalona (payback for the previous year's sweep), Gran Canaria (twice), the Italian Dolomiti Energia Trento and KK Budućnost, finishing the regular season with a 10-8 record. The victory against Budućnost helped the Wolves qualify for the EuroCup playoffs for the first time in club history. Cowan (EuroCup Weeks 4 and 11 MVP), Andrews, Blaževič, Žemaitis and Thurman played well, with Cowan becoming the team leader. Kulboka, who returned during the season after missing the previous season with Prometey Kamianske due to injury, became one of the club's best EuroCup players. In the EuroCup playoffs, despite home-court advantage, the Wolves were defeated 100-99 at home by U-BT Cluj-Napoca in double overtime.

The club hosted the 2025 King Mindaugas Cup at the Twinsbet Arena, defeating CBet Jonava 95-77 away and 85-72 at home and avenging their 2023 LKL quarterfinal loss. In the semifinals, the Wolves – favored with Žalgiris – faced BC Neptūnas (who had upset Wolves rival Rytas in the quarterfinals). The club led for most of the game before Neptūnas, cheered by their fans and Rytas fans, came back and won 87-83. Lietkabelis defeated the Wolves 100-91 for the bronze medal.

After their slow LKL start, the Wolves went on a nine-game winning streak which resulted in a home 100-82 victory against Žalgiris Kaunas and an away 82-71 win against BC Rytas. For most of the season, the club closely trailed Žalgiris and Rytas; however, particularly after their EuroCup elimination, the Wolves fell apart and won just nine of their remaining 22 games. This included losses to Žalgirs and Rytas, a sweep by Lietkabelis, and upset losses to Šiauliai and Nevėžis. The club fell to fifth-place before a victory against CBet moved them to fourth place and home-court advantage, with a 20-16 record. Cowan was named the season's LKL MVP.

The Wolves faced CBet Jonava in the playoffs, a rematch of the 2023 LKL playoffs (won by CBet) and the 2025 King Mindaugas Cup quarterfinals (won by the Wolves). Although the Wolves struggled against CBet during their first three seasons, the Wolves had won the season series and earned home-court advantage. In the LKL playoffs, history repeated as the Wolves lost a double-digit lead before CBet won 103-102 in Vilnius to take the series lead. In the rematch in Jonava, CBet lost a double-digit lead, before (led Brandon Childress) beating the Wolves 102-98 for the 2-0 series victory, ending the Wolves season on another whimper.

After another unsuccessful season and forecast changes to Lithuanian gambling laws, club founder Gediminas Žiemelis decided to withdraw his sponsorship. On 11 June 2025, the club decided not to submit documents required for EuroCup participation. The following day the club management asked the LKL to suspend its licence, intending to return to basketball after a two-year hiatus.

=== Bankruptcy ===
After the teams suspension was announced, news surged about unpaid wages during the last months of clubs operations. On March 30 2026, the club requested the LKL to extend the suspension of the licence, which was granted. On April 21 2026, the club has decleared bankruptcy.

== Home arenas ==
Twinsbet Arena in 2021

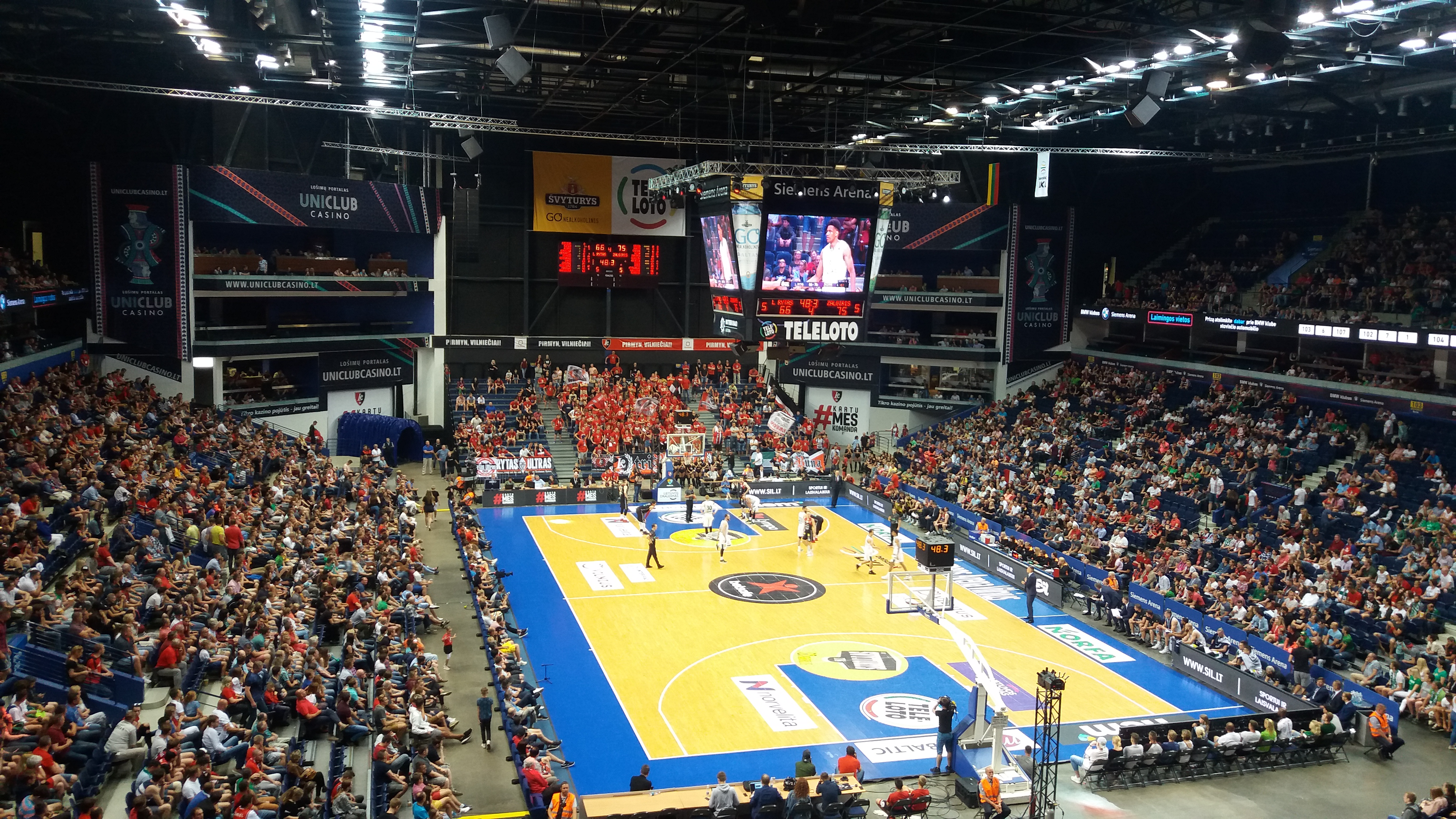
Arena interior during game four of the 2018 LKL Finals

The Wolves played their first-season home games at the 5,500-seat Alytus Arena, former home of Dzūkija Alytus. They played their home matches for the next two seasons at the renovated Twinsbet Arena in Vilnius, formerly known as ASG Arena and originally Siemens Arena. Built in 2004, it has a seating capacity of 10,000 for basketball events. The facility is also used by cross-town rival Rytas Vilnius for international games.

== Honours ==
- European North Basketball League: Runners–up (2022–23)

== Season results ==
Season	Tier	League	Pos.	Regional competitions	Pos.	KMT Cup	European competitions	
2022–23	1	LKL	5th	ENBL	2nd	Quarterfinals	FIBA Europe Cup	QR2
2023–24	1	LKL	4th			Quarterfinals	EuroCup	RS
2024–25	1	LKL	5th			Fourth place	EuroCup	EF

== Notable players ==
Note: Flags indicate national team eligibility at FIBA-sanctioned events. Players may hold other non-FIBA nationalities not displayed.

Criteria

To appear in this section a player must have either:

- Set a club record or won an individual award while at the club
- Played at least one official international match for their national team at any time
- Played at least one official NBA match at any time.

- (Lithuania) Mindaugas Lukauskis
- (Lithuania) Adas Juškevičius
- (Lithuania) Arnas Beručka
- (Lithuania) Eigirdas Žukauskas
- (Lithuania) Kristupas Žemaitis
- (Lithuania) Regimantas Miniotas
- (Lithuania) Vaidas Kariniauskas
- (Lithuania) Arnoldas Kulboka
- (Lithuania) Marek Blaževič
- (Lithuania) Matas Jogėla
- (Argentina) Marcos Delía
- (France) Hugo Invernizzi
- (Latvia) Artūrs Žagars
- (Nigeria) Christian Mekowulu
- (Philippines) Juan Gómez de Liaño
- (Serbia) Đorđe Gagić
- (Sweden) Jeffery Taylor
- (United States) Ahmad Caver
- (United States) Rasheed Sulaimon
- (United States) Garrison Brooks
- (United States) Tre'Shawn Thurman
- (United States) Andrew Andrews
- (United States) Anthony Cowan

== Head coaches ==
- (Lithuania) Rimas Kurtinaitis: 2022–2023
- (Lithuania) Kęstutis Kemzūra: 2023–2024
- (Lithuania) Nedas Pacevičius: 2024
- (Italy) Alessandro Magro: 2024–2025
