= Ignas =

- Gender: Male

Origin
- Origin: Ignatius
- Meaning: fiery one
- Region of origin: Lithuania

Ignas is a Lithuanian masculine given name. It may refer to:

- Ignas Šeinius (born 1889), Lithuanian writer
- Ignas Barkauskas (born 1988), Lithuanian diver
- Ignas Brazdeikis (born 1999), Lithuanian basketball player
- Ignas Budrys (1933–1999), Lithuanian painter
- Ignas Darkintis (born 1989), Lithuanian rugby union player
- Ignas Dedura (born 1978), Lithuanian football player
- Ignas Jonynas (1884–1954), Lithuanian diplomat and historian
- Ignas Malocha (born 1960), Tanzanian politician
- Ignas Navakauskas (born 1989), Lithuanian sprint canoeist
- Ignas Plūkas (born 1993), Lithuanian footballer
- Ignas Staškevičius (born 1970), Lithuanian businessman
