= Ignas Staškevičius =

Lithuanian business man and author (born 1970)

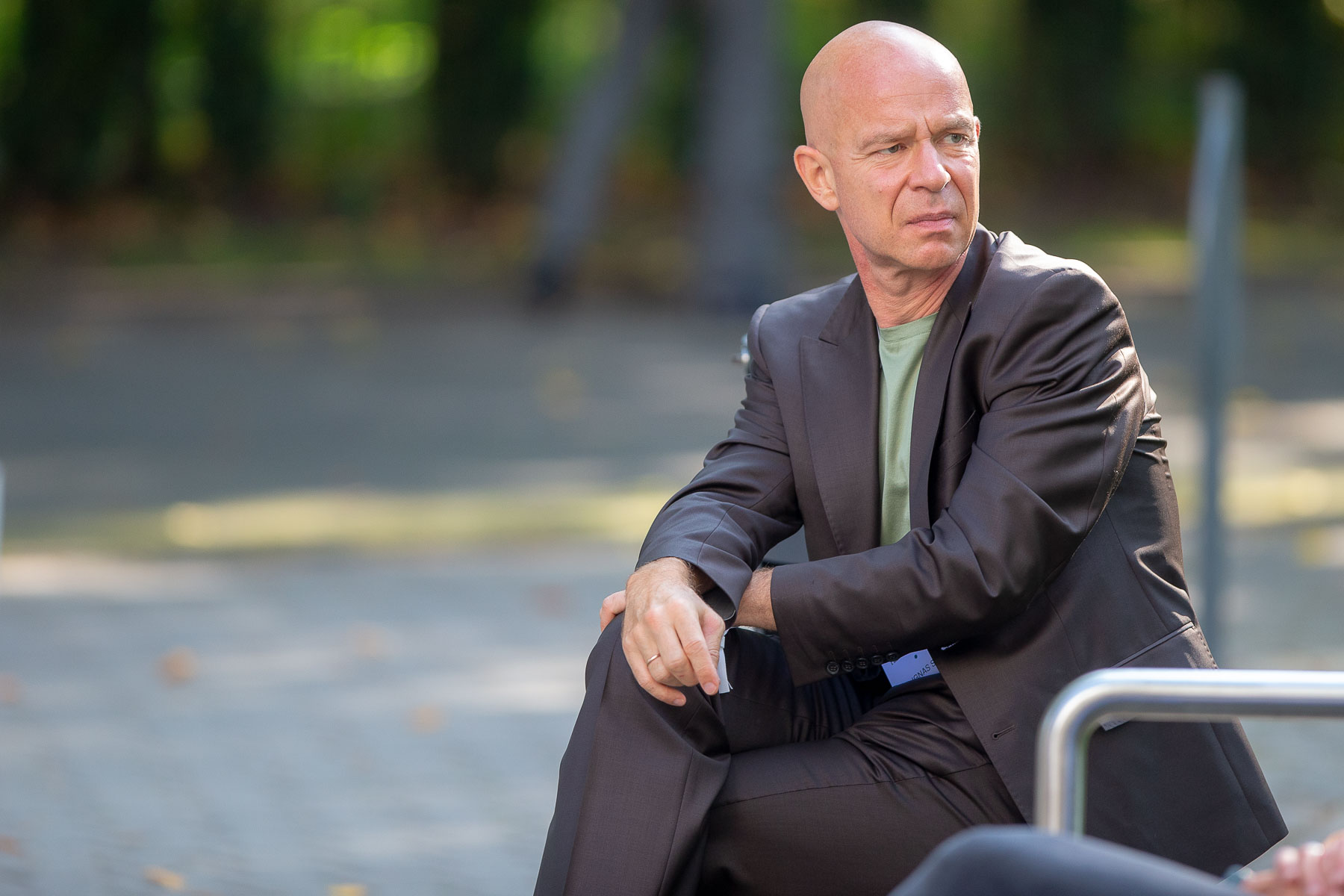
- Ignas Staškevičius in 2020
- Born: 7 May 1970 (age 56); Vilnius, Lithuania
- Education: Vilnius University
- Occupations: Businessman, Author

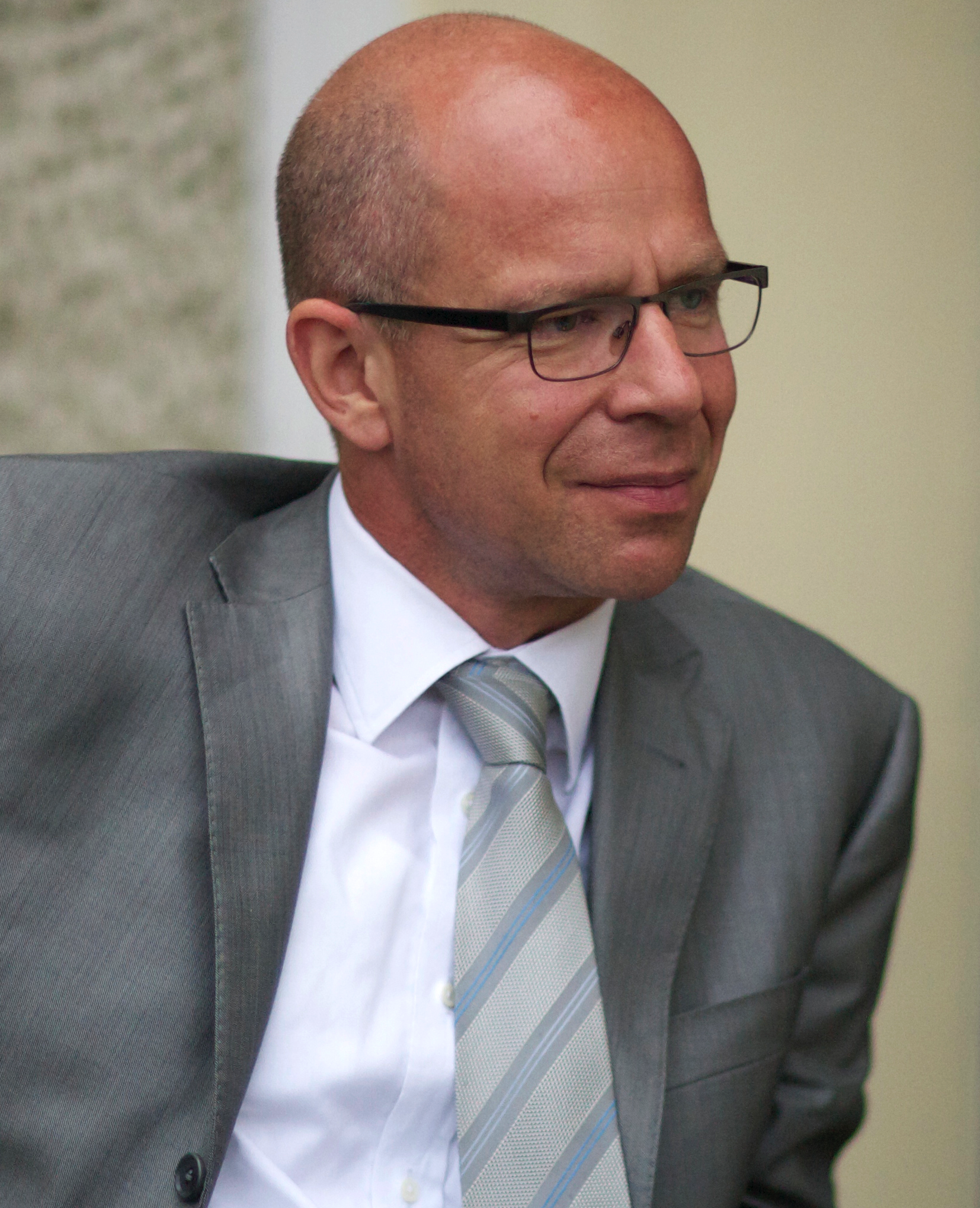
Ignas Staškevičius in 2015

Ignas Staškevičius is a Lithuanian businessman and author. From 2003 until 2005, he headed the retail company Maxima, a subsidiary to the VP Group. He founded the publishing house and bookstore Sofoklis in 2011 and has authored ten books.

== Biography ==
=== Early life ===
Ignas was born in Vilnius on 7 May 1970. His mother, Dalia Dilytė, is a writer and professor of Greek and Roman history, his father - a mathematician. Ignas developed an interest in basketball at a young age, competing in regional tournaments with his high school team. He graduated from the Vilniaus Baltupių School with an award for academic excellence in 1988. He went on to graduate from the Medical Department of Vilnius University and later studied law.

=== Business ===
Ignas started his business career by purchasing a barbershop with Nerijus Numavičius. He later affiliated with eight partners to found the private company VP Group. From 2003 until 2005, he served as the CEO of the retail chain Maxima run by the conglomerate. In 2005, he was appointed head manager of Euro-Vaistinė, a drugstore chain. Since 2008 he has been an adviser and board member in several firms.

=== Writing ===
Ignas's travel memoir, Kelias į bazę, was published in 2006. He continued to write about running and travel in 2011's Maratono laukas. In 2013, Ignas authored a satirical novel titled Domertas. Tapatybės kortelė, a collection of essays and short stories, was published in 2016. A collection of interviews in English translation, titled Sixteen Conversations, was released by Sofoklis in 2021 - the book includes interviews with A. B. Yehoshua, Vytautas Landsbergis, and Alan Lightman. Fifteen Conversations followed in 2023 - interviews with Marina Abramović, Jan Fabre, Omar Perez, Samanta Schweblin and others.

=== Other ===
In 2010, Ignas collaborated with the Latvian director Maris Martinsons, as a producer of the film Amaya. In 2019, he co-directed the documentary film "Trejetas".

He is credited as being one of the founders of the annual Vilnius Marathon. In 2013 the Lithuanian Sports University granted him an honorary degree in recognition of services rendered as president of the University's National Health Institute.
