= Žiemelis =

Žiemelis is a Lithuanian masculine name. Its feminine forms are Žiemelienė (married woman) and Žiemelytė (maiden name). Notable people with the surname include:

- Aleksandrs Žiemelis known as Sasha Siemel (1890–1970), Latvian adventurer and jaguar hunter
- Gediminas Žiemelis (born 1977), Lithuanian businessman
- Vidmantas Žiemelis (born 1950), Lithuanian politician
