= Vichy Water Park =

Water park in Lithuania

Vichy Vandens Parkas

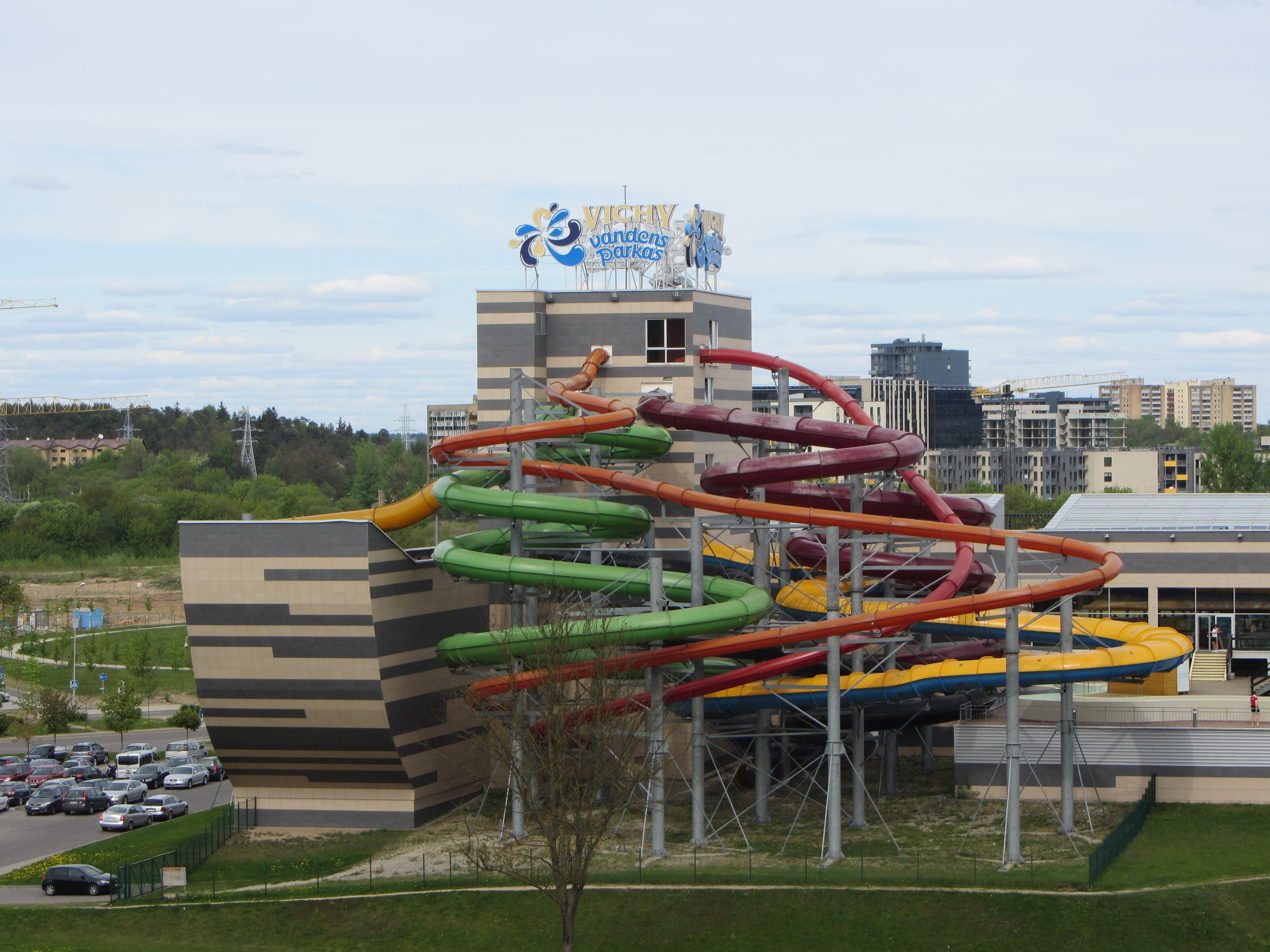
- Interactive map of Vichy Vandens Parkas
- Location: Vilnius, Lithuania
- Coordinates: 54°42′58″N 25°16′36″E
- Owner: ICOR Group
- Opened: 31 May 2007; 19 years ago
- Area: 13,400 square metres (144,000 ft^{2})
- Pools: 3 pools
- Water slides: 9 water slides
- Children's areas: A single children's area
- Website: vandensparkas.lt

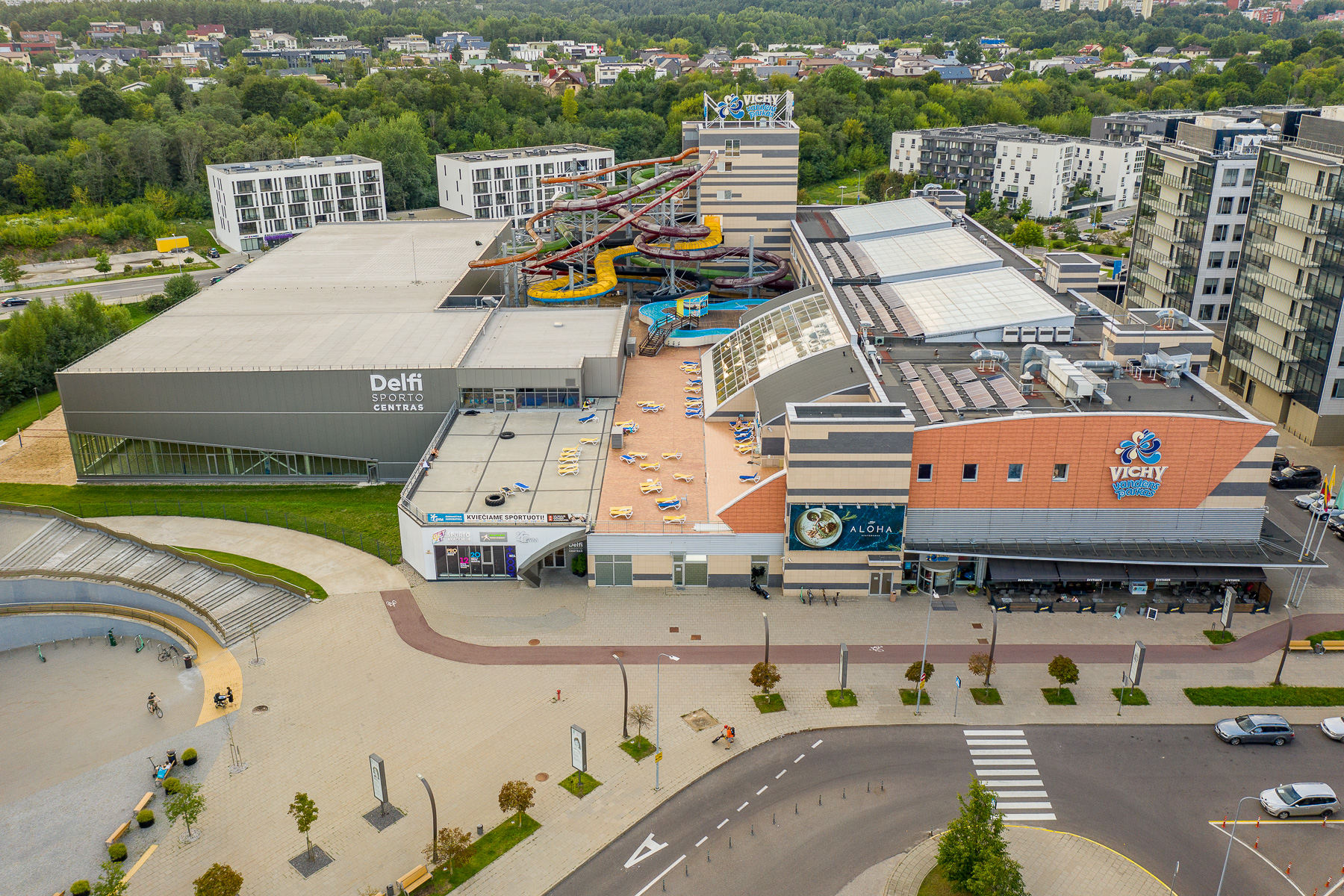
Vichy Water Park

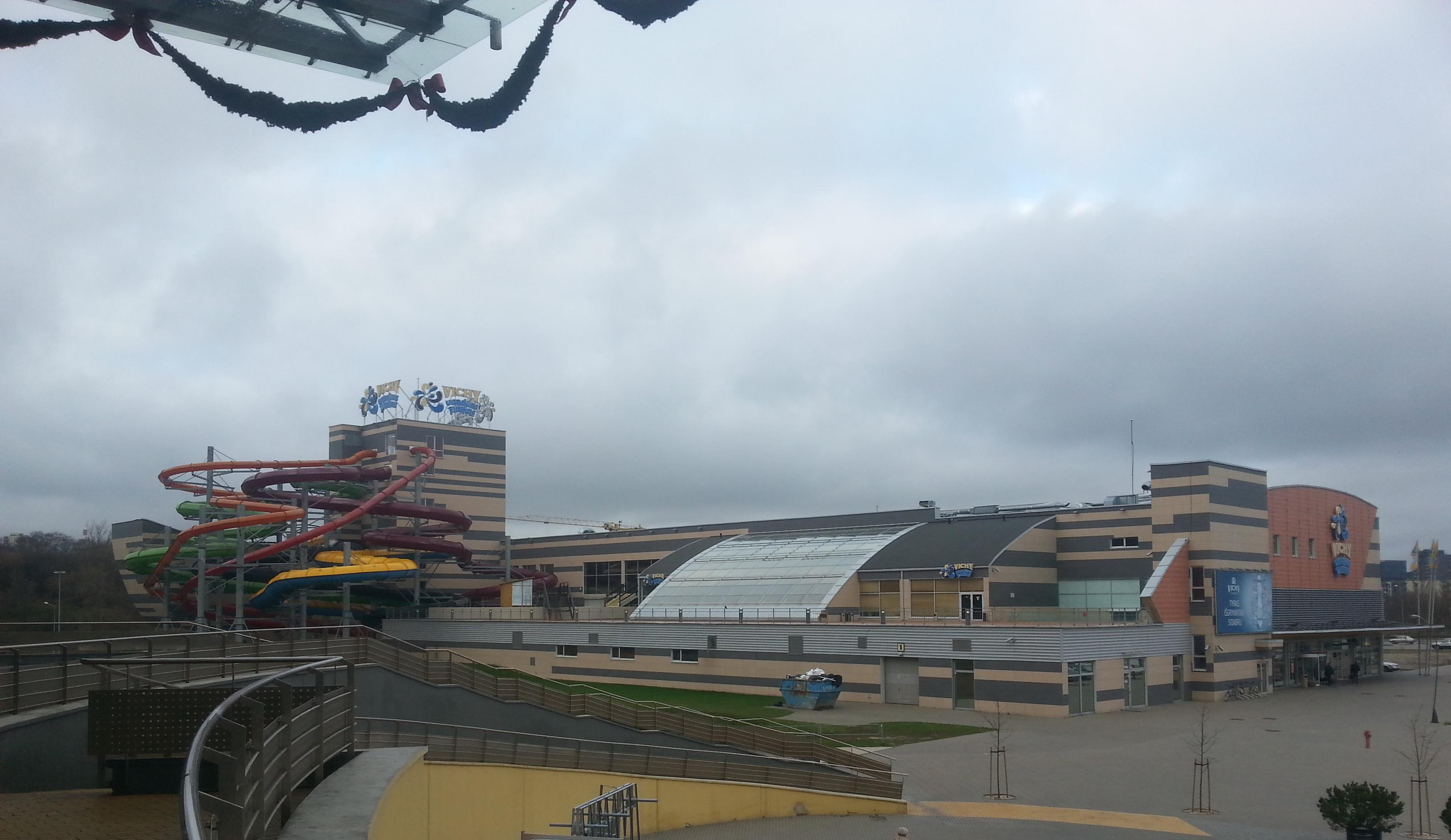

Vichy Water Park (Lithuanian: Vichy vandens parkas) is a Polynesian-themed water park located in the Ozas retail and entertainment district in Vilnius, Lithuania. The park opened 31 May 2007, and can accept 1,500 visitors at one time.

== History ==
The park was developed by the Rubicon Group (now ICOR) at a cost of 72 million litas (equivalent to about €20.85 million at the time). Construction of Vichy was overseen by the Lithuanian architects UAB Tiksli Forma with the waterslides designed and manufactured by Dutch company Van Egdom. Swiss company International Waterpark Management developed the conceptional design, and Spanish company Amusement Logic S.L. developed the park's Polynesian theme in consultation with the Polynesian Cultural Center in Hawaiʻi. To help evoke a tropical atmosphere, Vichy injects a fig oil-based scent throughout the park.

When constructed, Vichy was considered one of the largest and most advanced water parks in Europe. A visitor study of the park's first month found that 52 percent of park attendees came from Vilnius. It employs about 130 people.

In 2013, after an incident where a 9-year-old girl was pulled into a drainage pipe, the park was fined 22,500 litas (about €6,500) for safety violations. The company was previously fined 10,000 litas (about €2,900) for misleading pricing for an annual pass.

In Summer 2022, as part of the global energy crisis and the Russia–E.U. gas dispute, surging energy prices led Vichy Water Park to substantailly cut back its operations and to consider price increases in an attempt to offset rising electricity costs.

== Attractions ==
Vichy Water Park is built around nine waterslides with a total length, according to the park, "three-times the height of the Vilnius TV Tower". The longest is the 162-metre (177 yd) Pitkern's Cave. Three waterslides have grades as steep as 20%. In addition, there is a 280-square-metre (3,000 ft^{2}) wave pool and a 137-metre (150 yd) lazy river, along with Game Island (Žaidimų sala), a children's play area. The park also has a jacuzzi pool and three bathing areas with a "Turkish" bath, Russian steam bath, saunas, and spa services.

Vichy Water Park Waterslides
Name (en)	Name (lt)	Length (m)	Max. Grade	Min. Age	Notes
Fiji Squall	Fidžio viesulas	152	20%	11	Max. speed 60 km/h (37 mph)
Black Pearl	Juodasis perlas	103	13%	6	
Yell of the Māori	Maorių klyksmas	115		11	15-metre (49 ft) high boomerang
Moreja Volcano	Morėjos vulkanas	110	20%	11	Max. speed 60 km/h (37 mph)
Moskito	Moskito	31		6	For children (max. age 18)
Ohano River	Ohanos upė	111	13%	6	
Pitkern's Cave	Pitkerno urvas	162	13%	6	
Rapa Nui Chasm	Rapa Nui bedugnė	3.6	20%	14	Drops straight into a pool
Tonga Snake	Tongos gyvatė	159	13%	6	
