= Arena Vilnius =

Sports arena in Vilnius, Lithuania

- Arena Vilnius in 2021
- Interactive map of Arena Vilnius
- Former names: Siemens Arena (2004–2020); Avia Solutions Group Arena (2020–2024); Twinsbet Arena (2024-2026)
- Address: Ozo g. 14
- Location: Vilnius, Lithuania
- Coordinates: 54°42′58.8″N 25°16′47.8″E
- Owner: Avia Solutions Group >99% Vilnius City Municipality <1%
- Capacity: Basketball: 10,000; Concerts: 13,500; Ice hockey: 8,750

Construction
- Opened: 30 October 2004
- Cost: 25 million USD
- Architects: Jungtinės Architektų Dirbtuvės; Stadium Consultants International

Tenants
- Rytas Vilnius (2004–2022, 2023–present); Wolves Twinsbet (2023–2025)

Website
- arenavilnius.lt

Arena Vilnius, located in the southern part of Verkiai elderate of Vilnius, is the largest arena in Vilnius and second largest in Lithuania. It generally hosts basketball games as well as concerts. The arena opened on 30 October 2004.

Basketball club Rytas Vilnius has played most of their matches in this arena since 2004. BC Wolves have played all of their home matches in the arena starting from the 2023-24 season.

The arena has gone through several commercial name changes. Until 2020, it was called Siemens Arena, through a long-term title sponsorship deal with Siemens, before being changed to Avia Solutions Group Arena. On 9 April 2024, the name of the arena was changed to Twinsbet Arena. On 14 April 2026, the name of the arena was changed to Arena Vilnius due to a new prohibitions on gambling advertising.

== History ==
Arena is a popular Lithuanian sport, entertainment, and cultural object, which has earned the recognition of countries all over the world: in 2004, the arena was selected as the best sport building of the year in Lithuania. In the same year, it won the right to host the 2011 Men's European Basketball Championship.

In the end of 2007, the arbitrator of international product brands Superbrands awarded the then-called Siemens Arena as a brand growing popularity in Lithuania. The Superbrands award was given to 28 product brands, which differs by their influence to the market, values, ways to success and originality.

Twinsbet Arena was built in the Vilnius Entertainment Park territory and is the first object of this park, which is still under development. The other buildings for the Vilnius Entertainment Park next to the arena: an indoor water park, family entertainment center, an Event field and a natural park.

The venue hosted some matches of the 2021 FIFA Futsal World Cup.

In November 2020, Siemens Arena was renamed to Avia Solutions Group Arena.

On April 9, 2024, the arena changed its name again, this time being renamed to Twinsbet Arena.

In 2027, the venue will host the final phase of the FIBA Women's EuroBasket.

== Events ==
Twinsbet Arena is the first universal arena of international level in Lithuania. Here, the largest national entertainment, sports and business events take place: concerts of known and local sport stars, various international sports matches, performances, theatre performances, business seminars and assemblies.

Many world-famous music stars had performed here, including Metallica, Slipknot, Rammstein, Anastacia, Aerosmith, Phil Collins, Def Leppard, Patricia Kaas, Lana Del Rey, James Blunt, Hurts, t.A.T.u., Deep Purple, Sting, Chris Rea, Paco de Lucía, Toto Cutugno, Ozzy Osbourne, Simple Minds, Simply Red, Nazareth, Scorpions, Depeche Mode, Dream Theater, Enrique Iglesias, Linkin Park, Lenny Kravitz, Dima Bilan, Avril Lavigne, Snoop Dogg, Backstreet Boys, R.E.M. and Helena Paparizou, David Guetta ft. Kelly Rowland, Kylie Minogue, Ed Sheeran.

== Gallery ==
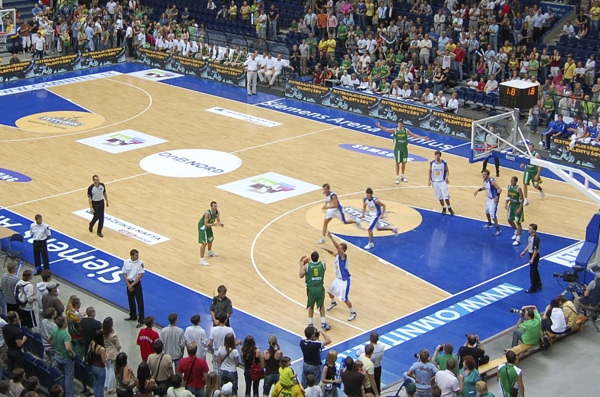
Lithuania vs Iceland basketball game at Siemens Arena (2008-07-15)

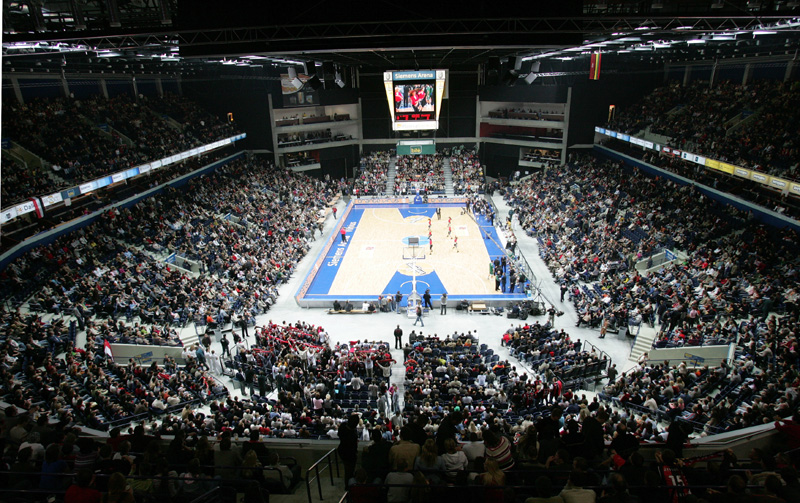
Basketball game

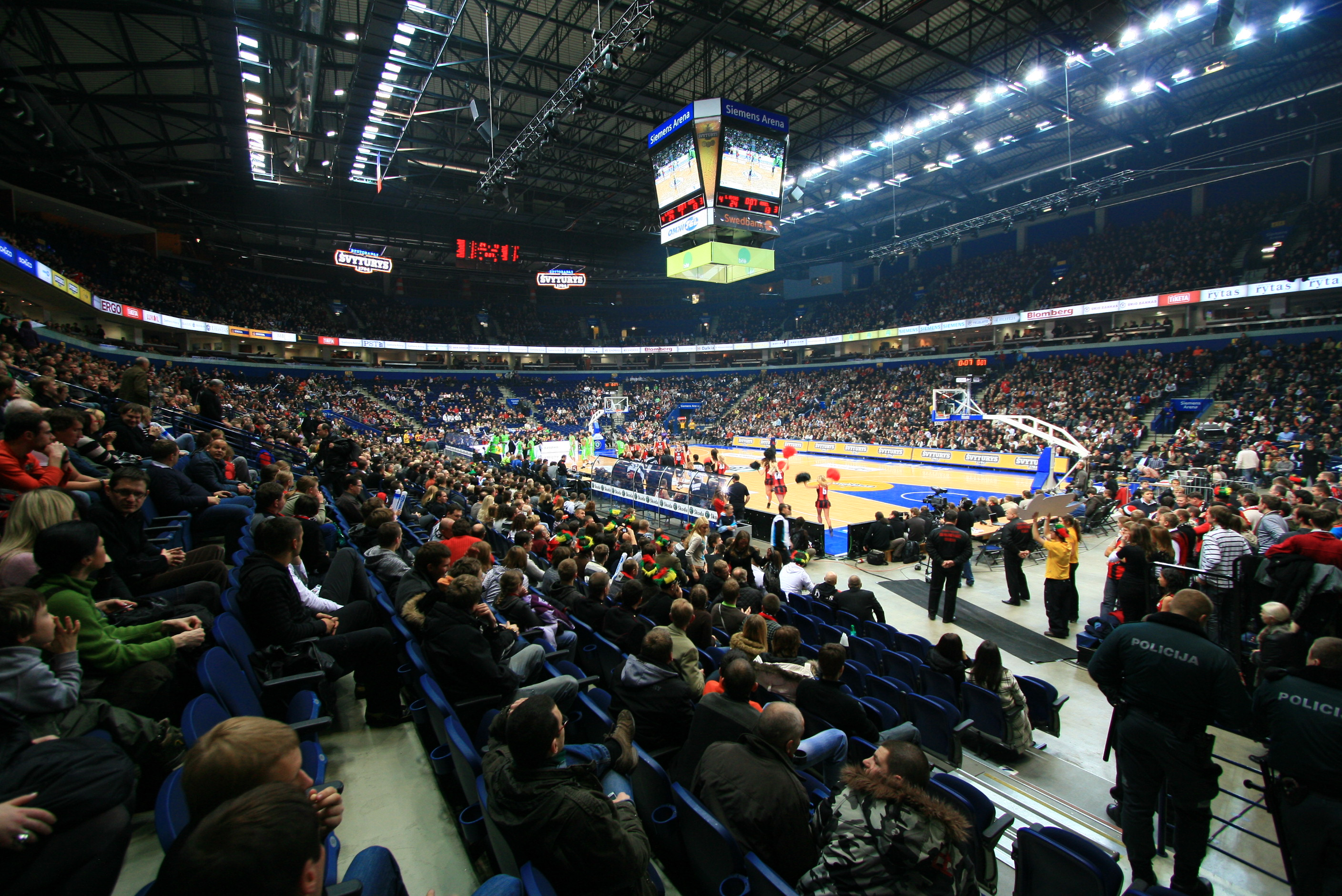
Basketball game

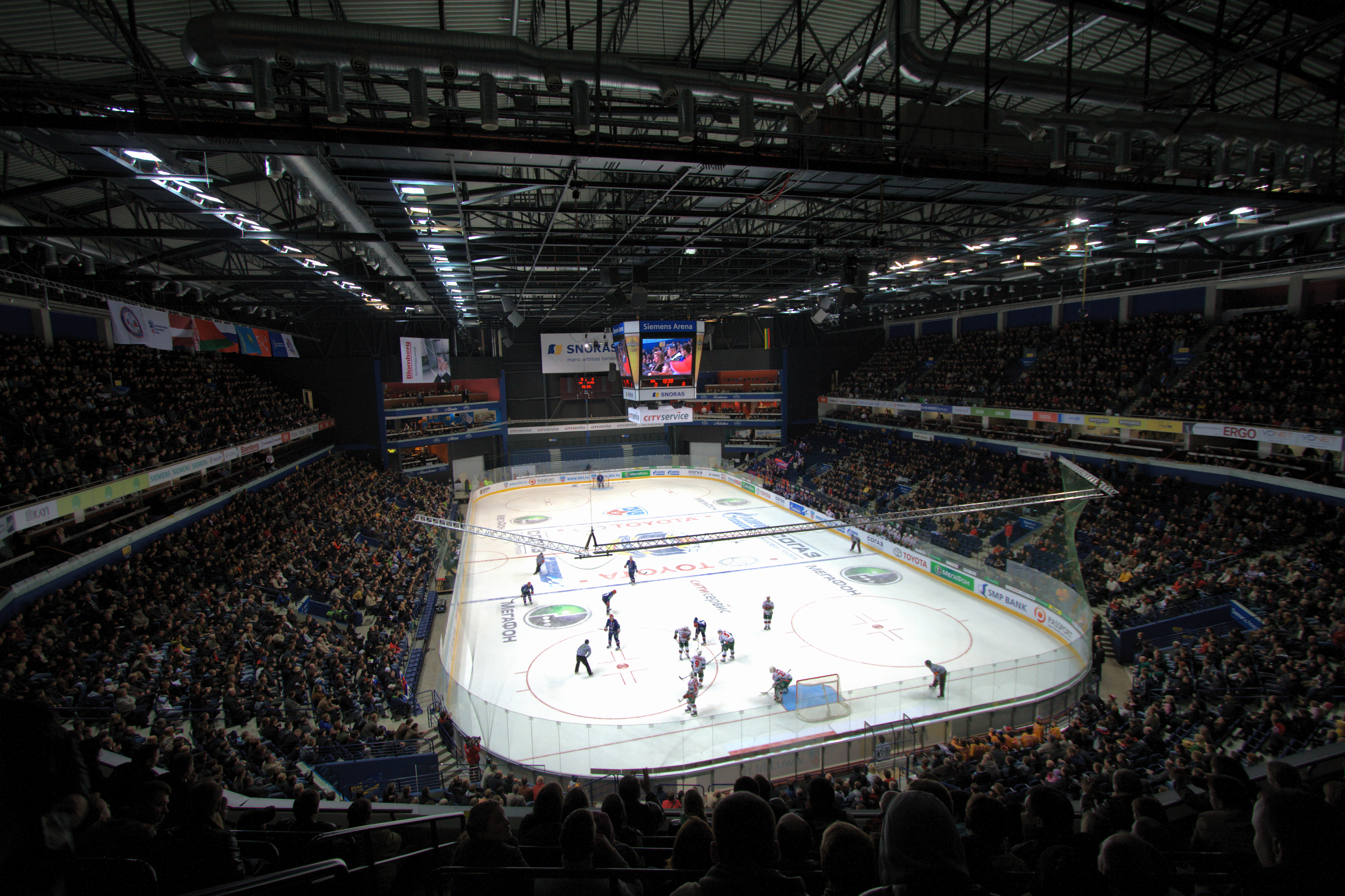
KHL ice hockey match SKA – Ak Bars

== See also ==
- Active Vilnius Arena
- List of indoor arenas in Lithuania

Preceded by Peace and Friendship Stadium; Piraeus	FIBA Women's EuroBasket; Final venue 2027	Succeeded by TBD; TBD
