= Andrius Janukonis =

Lithuanian business jurist and entrepreneur

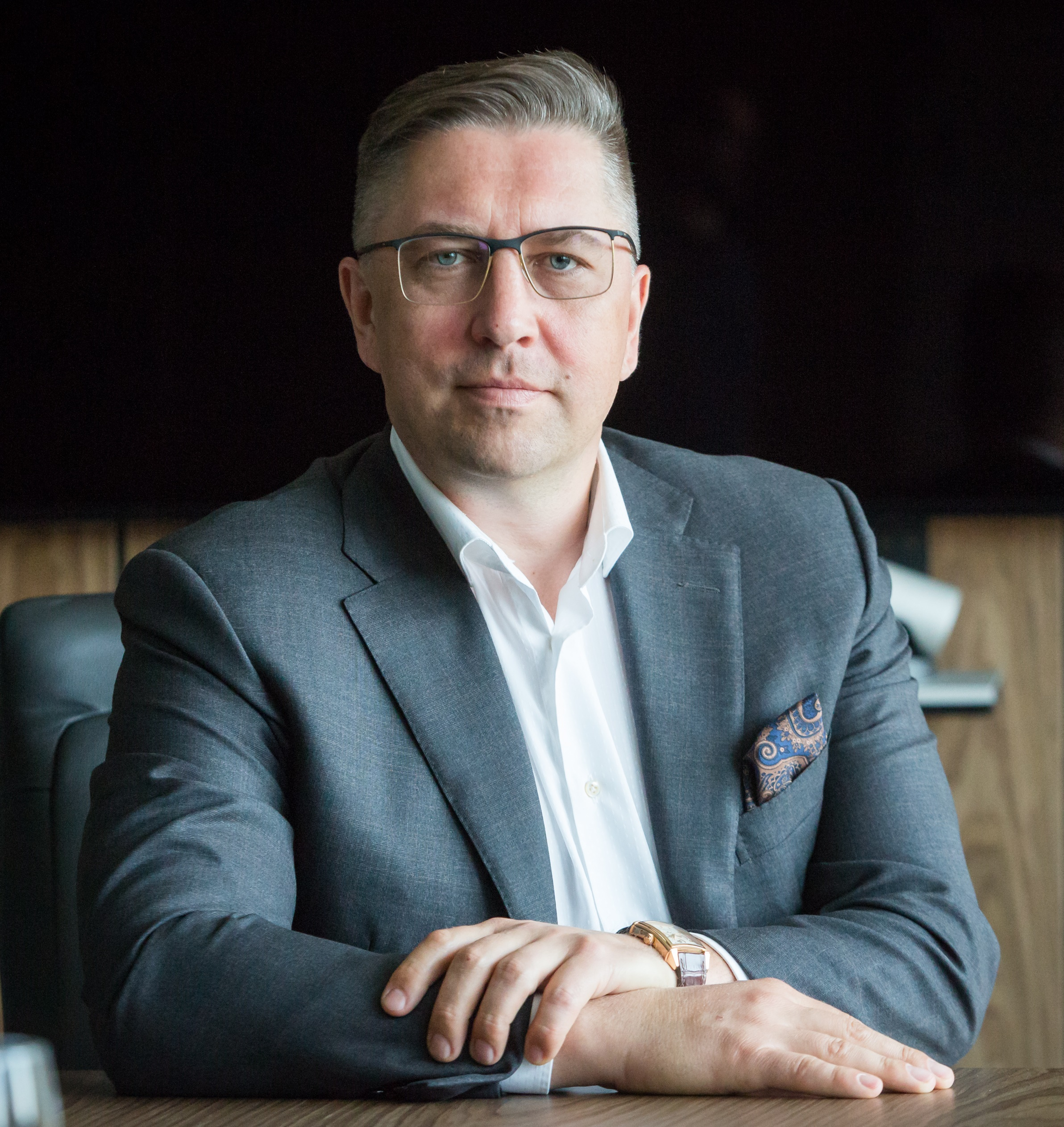
A. Janukonis

Andrius Janukonis (born 1971 in Jonava) is a Lithuanian business jurist and entrepreneur. He is Chairman of the Board of UAB ICOR and Supervisory Board Chairman of AB City Service.

== Biography ==
Andrius Janukonis graduated in 1988 from Jonava 3rd High School. He grew up in a family of engineers in Jonava. Janukonis competed in the Marine School in Leningrad, but was rejected because of myopia. Then he studied at Vilnius University. In 1993 Janukonis graduated from the Law Faculty. His first business experience was in the train from Vilnius-Kaunas, where he established a video parlor at the age of 17. At 18, Janukonis, together with his friends from university, co-founded the company Rubicon, the basis of today's UAB ICOR. He began intensive commercial activities, the business grew to become one of the leading enterprises of Lithuania with a turnover of 558 million EUR in 2018.

He is married. His wife is Živilė Janukonienė (born 1971 in Jonava), a sociologist; and has two children Ignas and Vitas.

== Literatur ==
- Riziką prisijaukinęs avantiūristas. Dienraštis Lietuvos rytas. Žurnalas „Stilius“. Priedas „Stiprioji lytis“, p. 27-30.
