= Kesko Senukai =

Lithuanian DIY- and home improvement store company

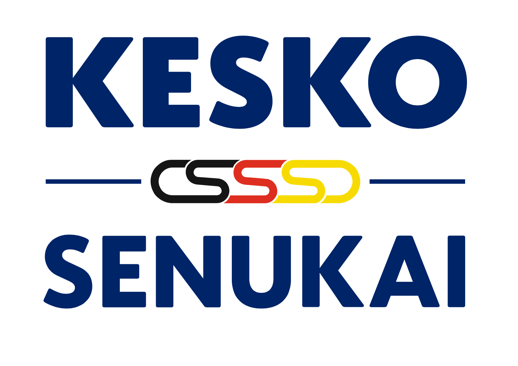

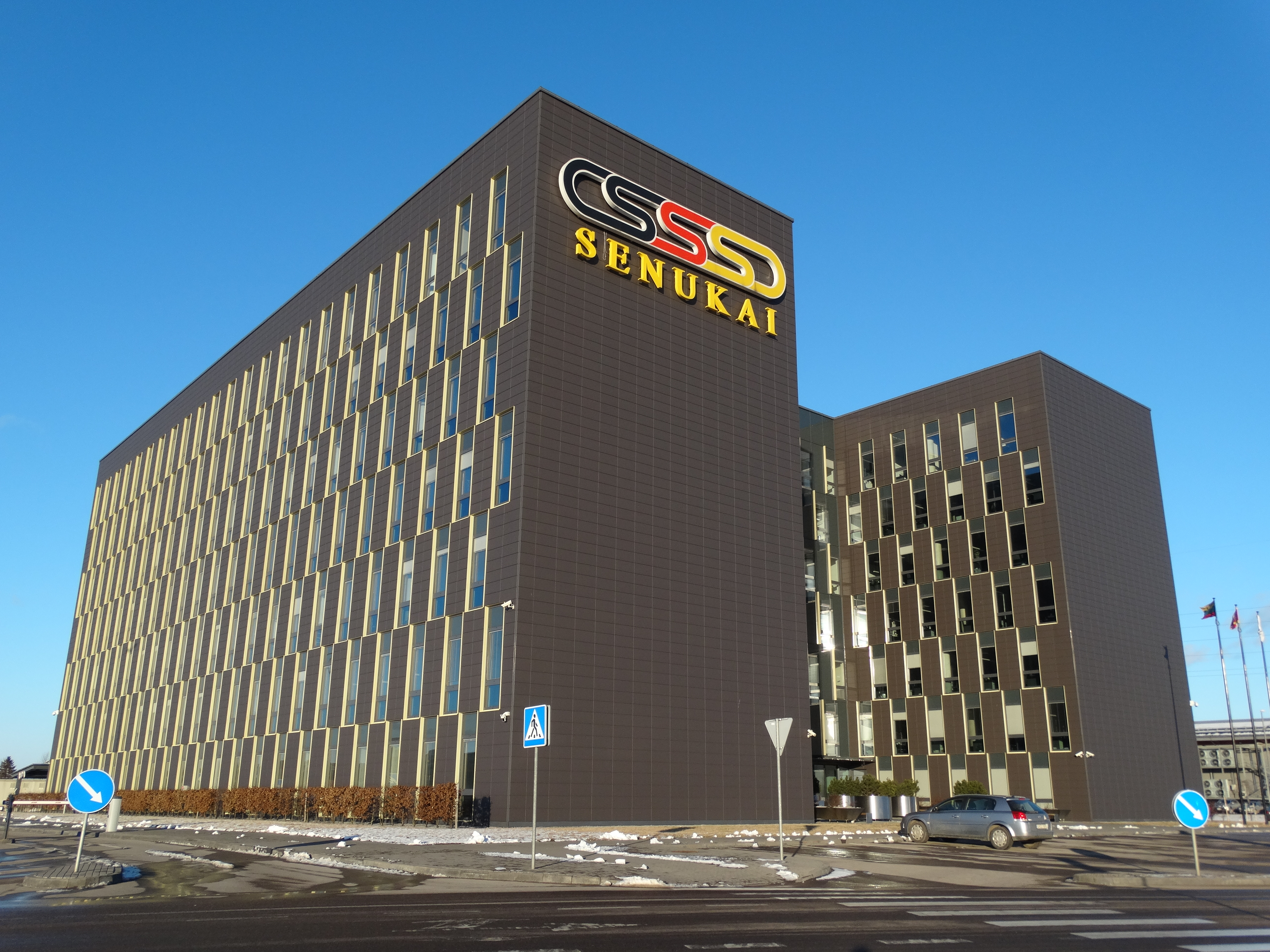
- Kesko Senukai headquarters in Kaunas, Lithuania
- Type: Company group
- Industry: DIY; building; retailing; wholesale trading; online trading; Real estate
- Founded: 1992
- Headquarters: Kaunas, Lithuania
- Number of locations: 128 stores (85 "Senukai" and "Statybu duona" stores in Lithuania, 8 "K-Rauta" and "KSenukai" stores in Latvia, 8 "K-Rauta" stores in Estonia, and 27 "OMA" stores in Belarus)
- Key people: Augustinas Rakauskas (founder); Arturas Rakauskas (president of JSC "Kesko Senukai Lithuania")
- Revenue: ▲€1.2 billion (2023)
- Operating income: ▼€50.8 million (2023)
- Net income: ▼€43.5 million (2023)
- Number of employees: 2967 (2022)
- Parent: Kesko
- Website: www.senukai.lt

Kesko Senukai is a group of companies which runs the largest retail chain of do-it-yourself (abbr. DIY), house building, home repairing and improvement stores in the Baltics. Kesko Senukai is one of the largest companies in Lithuania engaged in retailing, wholesaling, and online trade. It also offers building repair, interior design, electronics, gardening, leisure, real commercial asset management, energy, financial, tourism, and recreation services and goods.

== Management ==
Kesko Senukai is equally owned by Finnish trade group Kesko and Artūras Rakauskas. JSC "Kesko Senukai Lithuania" controlling stake is owned by Kesko (Rautakesko OY) since 2003. Both owners share a strategic partnership agreement. Trade network is owned and managed by Kesko Senukai.

In Latvia, Kesko Senukai runs through its company JSC "Kesko Senukai Latvia", in Estonia – over JSC "Kesko Senukai Estonia".

JSC "Kesko Senukai Lithuania" CEO is Arvydas Sapola since 2015.

Kesko Senukai is a centrally managed company, its board of directors and owned subsidiaries are located in Kaunas, Lithuania.

== Organizational structure ==
Kesko Senukai currently consists of 7 major business units: JSC “Kesko Senukai Lithuania”, JSC “Senukai”, JSC “Kesko Senukai Digital”, JSC “Kesko Senukai Latvia”, JSC “Kesko Senukai Estonia”, “Senukai” Association and “Senukai” Charity and Support Foundation. Kesko Senukai is a part of Scandinavian retailing conglomerate Kesko.

In 2003, Rakauskai family acquired controlling stake of "Baltic Shopping Centers" which is a real estate investment company. In 2005, Rakauskai became sole shareholder of CJSC "Baltic Shopping Centers". In 2015, company's total assets amounted to €200,000,000, and it owned real estate area amounted to 147,000 square meters (1,580,000 sq ft).

Kesko Senukai owns "Harmony Park" located in Prienai district (Lithuania), and radio station "Žiniu radijas" since 2010.

== History ==
- In 1992, Augustinas Rakauskas founded the "Senukai" company.
- In 1993, the first "Senukai" store was opened in Kaunas (Lithuania).
- In 1994, the company started wholesale trading.
- In 1995, the company expanded its services and manufacturing.
- In 1996, the company opened a shopping mall in Kaunas (Lithuania).
- In 1997, the first "Senukai" franchise store is opened in Prienai (Lithuania).
- In 1997, the company opened a wholesale trading terminal and started to develop its retail trade network in Lithuania.
- In 2001, the company opened "Senukai" store in Kaunas, at Draugystes street. It is the biggest "Senukai" store in Lithuania with an area over 26,000 square meters (280,000 sq ft).
- In 2001, Kesko Senukai created its new concept store "Statybu duona".
- In 2001, Kesko Senukai founded its charity fund.
- In 2001, the first "Senukai" store was opened in Vilnius, in Ukmerges street.
- In 2002, the first "Senukai" store was opened abroad, in Riga (Latvia).
- In 2003, the company signed a strategic partnership agreement with the Finnish company "Rautakesko OY".
- In 2004, the "Banginis" shopping mall was opened, in which "Senukai" stores occupy the largest area.
- In 2005, the largest shopping and leisure centre "Mega" was opened in Kaunas (Lithuania), in which the "Senukai" store occupies an area of 22,000 square meters (240,000 sq ft).
- In 2005, a "Senukai" store was opened in Utena city (Lithuania).
- In 2006–2007, new "Senukai" stores were opened in Panevezys, Kaisiadorys, Alytus and Elektrenai (Lithuania).
- In 2008, a "Senukai" logistics centre was opened. It is one of the biggest logistics centres in the Baltic countries.
- In 2008, "Banginis" shopping mall was opened in Klaipeda city (Lithuania). "Senukai" store occupies 18,000 square meters (190,000 sq ft) of the shopping mall.
- In 2009, the first online store was opened.
- In 2010, Kesko Senukai renewed their retail store in Telsiai city (Lithuania).
- In 2011, Kesko Senukai opened a second store in Panevezys city (Lithuania).
- In 2012, company renewed its "Sodo centrai" stores.
- In 2013, company opened a "Senukai" store in Druskininkai city (Lithuania), renewed "Namu technikos centrai" stores, and opened a store of house interior decorations "Namu stilius" in Vilnius city (Lithuania).
- In 2014, company opened its new administration building near shopping mall "Mega" in Kaunas, Lithuania.
- In 2014, the largest "Senukai" store was opened in Siauliai district, Lithuania.
- In 2015, a "Senukai" store was opened in Kaunas city.
- In 2015, specialized construction materials stores "Statybu duona" in Siauliai and Panevezys cities, were equipped with the ability to shop without leaving a car (drive-in stores).
- In 2015, an agreement on managing 16 "K-Rauta" stores in Latvia and Estonia was signed
- Kesko Senukai started to carry out all online retail trade activities in Lithuania, Latvia and Estonia through its newly established JSC "Kesko Senukai Digital".
- In 2016, JSC "Senuku prekybos centras" changed its name to JSC "Kesko Senukai Lithuania".

== Awards ==
In 2015, JSC "Kesko Senukai Lithuania" was recognized as the best and the biggest business in Lithuania at European Business Awards (abbr. EBA). In 2016, Kesko Senukai represented Lithuania in the EBA finals and competed for the title of the best European company.

In 2015, JSC "Kesko Senukai Lithuania" was one of the largest companies in Central and Eastern Europe (430th according to 2015 full-year income).

In 2016, Kesko Senukai online store was awarded as the best online store in Lithuania at "Login 2016" awards.

== Trade network ==
Kesko Senukai operates the largest network of house construction, home repairing and improvement shops in Baltic states Total sales area covers more than 250,000 square meters (2,700,000 sq ft). In 2017, there were 85 "Senukai" and "Statybu duona" stores and one online store operating in Lithuania. Every month "Senukai" stores attracts an estimated 1,000,000 shoppers in Lithuania.

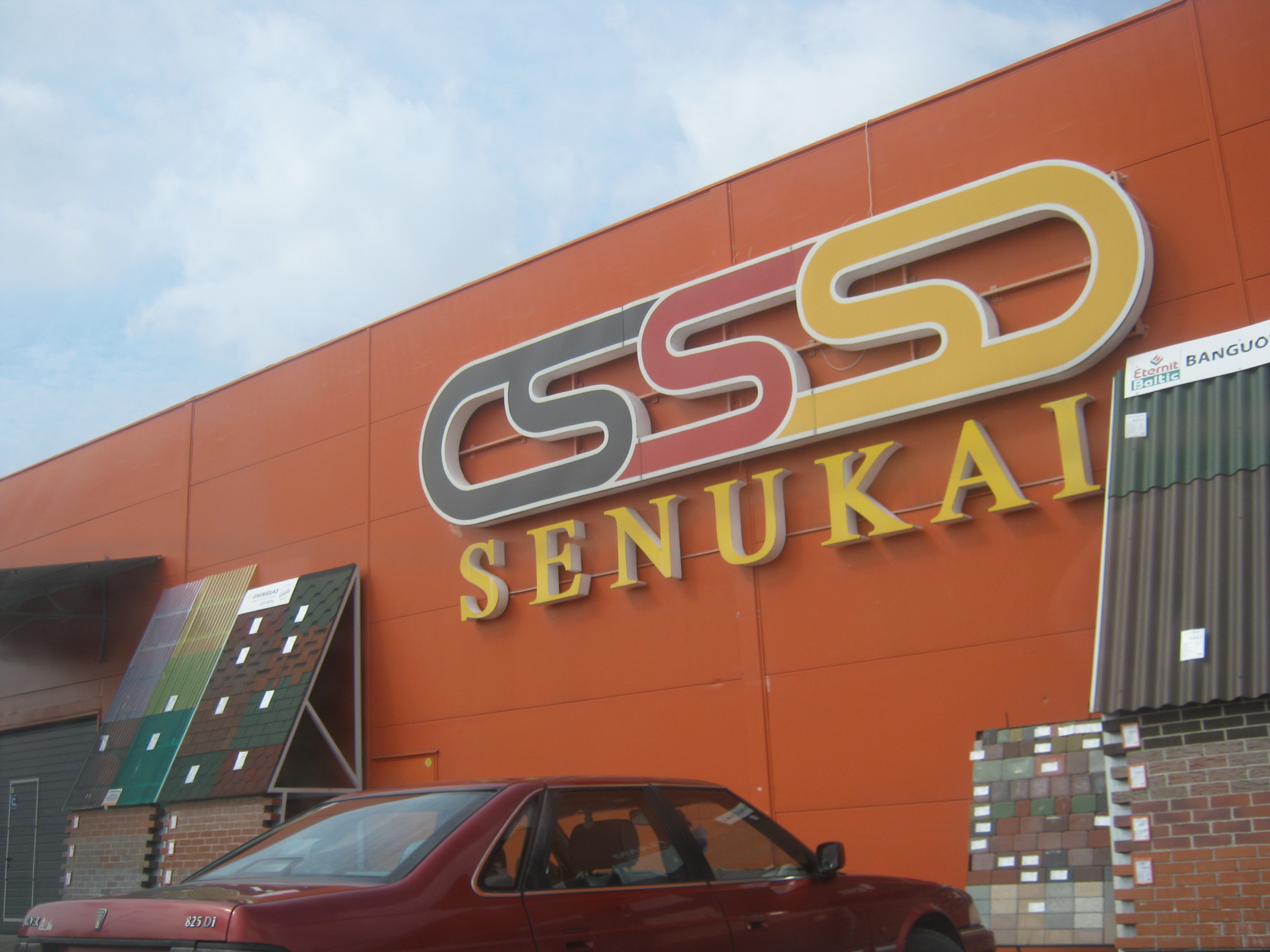
"Kesko Senukai" in Kaišiadorys

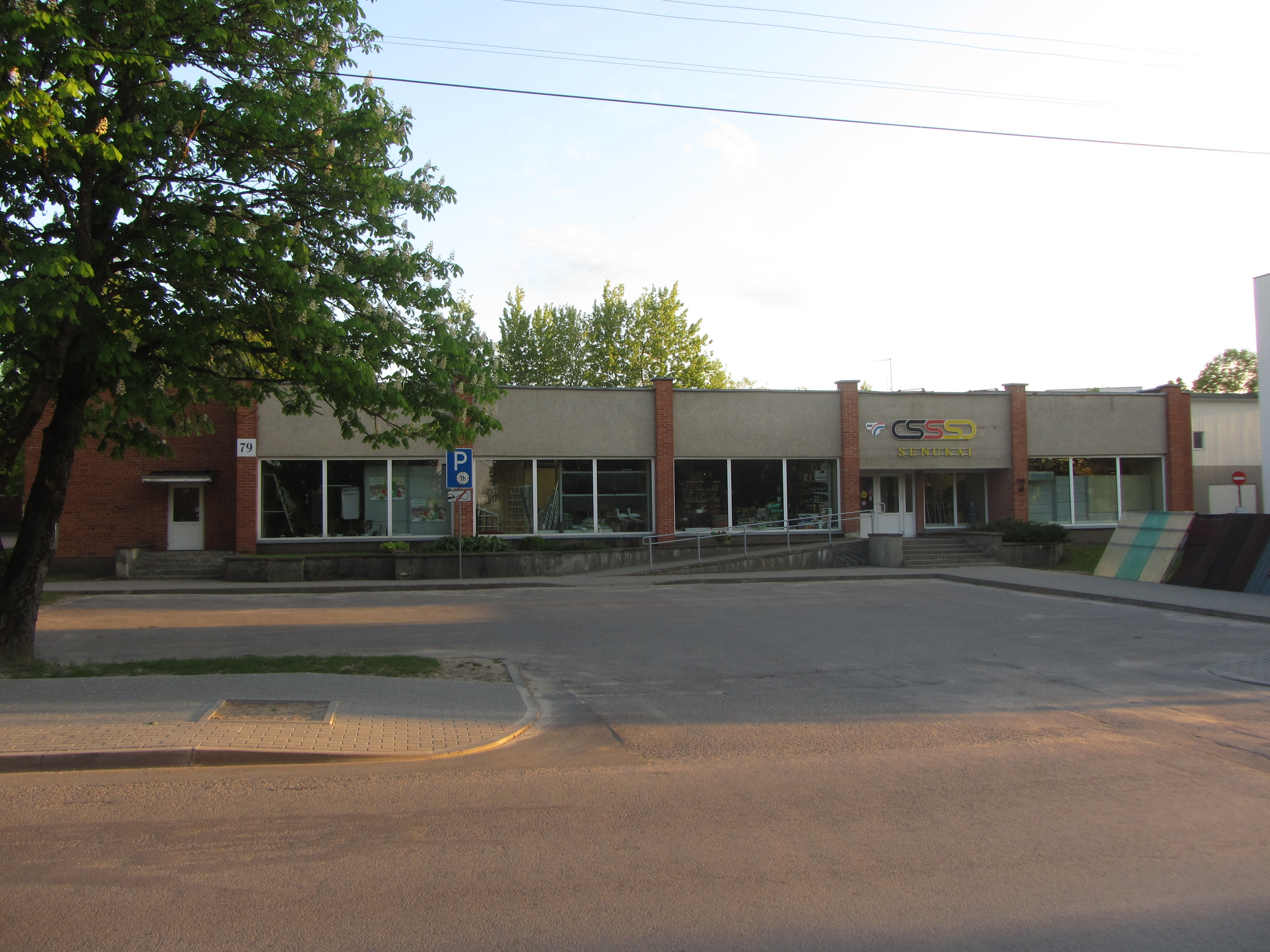
Store in Širvintos

In 2017, "Senukai" and "Statybu duona" shops operated in Vilnius (5), Kaunas (7), Klaipėda (2), Šiauliai (2), Panevėžys (2), Alytus (2), Marijampolė (2), Tauragė (2), Telšiai (2), Utena (1), Kybartai (2), Joniškis (2), Lazdijai (2), Raseiniai (2), Jonava (2), Gargždai (1), Palanga (1), Kaišiadorys (1), Kazlų Rūda (1), Radviliškis (2), Pasvalys (2), Elektrėnai (1), Šeduva (1), Kuršėnai (1), Pakruojis (1), Naujoji Akmenė (1), Varėna (2), Prienai (3), Plungė (2), Šakiai (2), Anykščiai (2), Skuodas (2), Trakai (1), Ukmergė (2), Šalčininkai (3), Nemenčinė (1), Ignalina (3), Kretinga (1), Mažeikiai (2), Kupiškis (1), Zarasai (1), Šilutė (2), Rietavas (1), Kelmė (2), Šilalė (2), Kalvarijos (1), Rokiškyje (1), Jurbarke (2), Širvintos (1), Kėdainiuose (2), Vilkaviškyje (2), Druskininkai (1), Biržai (1) and Pagėgiai (1).

Kesko Senukai operates 8 "KSenukai" stores in Latvia and 8 "K-Rauta" stores in Estonia. In 2016, Kesko Senukai opened its first new concept store "KSenukai" in Riga (Latvia).

Kesko Senukai operates the largest network of household building and repairing shops "OMA" in Belarus. In 2015, there were 14 "OMA" stores in Belarus,12 of them were brand shops and 2 operated as franchisees. In 2017, "OMA" stores number grew up to 27 in Belarus. "OMA" operates stores in the biggest cities of Belarus.

=== Online trade ===
In 2009, Kesko Senukai opened its first online store and in 2015 it was renewed. In 2016, management of online store was delegated to JSC "Kesko Senukai Digital", and new online stores were opened in Latvia and Estonia.

=== Wholesale trade ===
Kesko Senukai offers more than 42,000 DYI, building repair, interior design, electronics, gardening, and leisure goods for wholesale traders. In collaboration with 25,000 regular wholesale buyers in Lithuania and abroad, Kesko Senukai is importing and exporting goods to Europe and CIS countries on regular basis.

=== On-demand trade ===
Customers are able to order from catalogs in Kesko Senukai on-demand trade facilities. Kesko Senukai works with more than 300 suppliers who offer more than 230,000 items for sale. In the largest Vilnius, Kaunas and Klaipeda stores, customers are able to order services by interior designers and artisans, as well as curtain tailoring services, transportation of goods and other services.

=== Shop in the shop ===
Kesko Senukai created their specific trade concept called "Shop in the shop". These are specialized stores which one can find in a specific "Senukai" shop's sections, and offers specific items and services:

- "Namu technikos centras" (abbr. NTC) – a specialized home appliances and electronic goods trade centre. In the end of 2013, five biggest NTC centres had been upgraded and their products range was significantly expanded.
- "Sodo centras" – a specialized garden, vegetable garden and home environment products centre.
- "Svajonių šalis" – a specialized children's toys and games centre.
- "Namų stilius" – a specialized floor and wall finishes, plumbing, lighting products and their accessories centre.
- "Statybų duona" – specialized building materials stores for small wholesale and private customers in construction.

== Products ==
Kesko Senukai stores offer more than 155,000 products from over 400 worldwide known brands.

Kesko Senukai sells construction and insulation materials: internal and external finishing and repairing materials, plumbing supplies and plumbing equipment, walls, ceilings and floors, glues and paints, electrical goods, household appliances, household and farm goods, audio and video equipment, computer technology, tools for professionals and amateurs, heating and ventilation equipment, wood and metal products, furniture, garden tools, machinery and plants, sports and leisure goods, stationery supplies, car supplies, toys, commemorative goods, cookware, dishes, bedding, household chemicals and household goods, saunas and fireplaces, welding equipment, networks and industrial equipment, plant maintenance supplies, and animal goods.

== Services ==
Kesko Senukai provides home repairing and decoration, financial, home appliances, entertainment, transport and other services (in total more than 20 different services). Its "Harmony Park" provides tourism and recreation services.

== Logistics ==
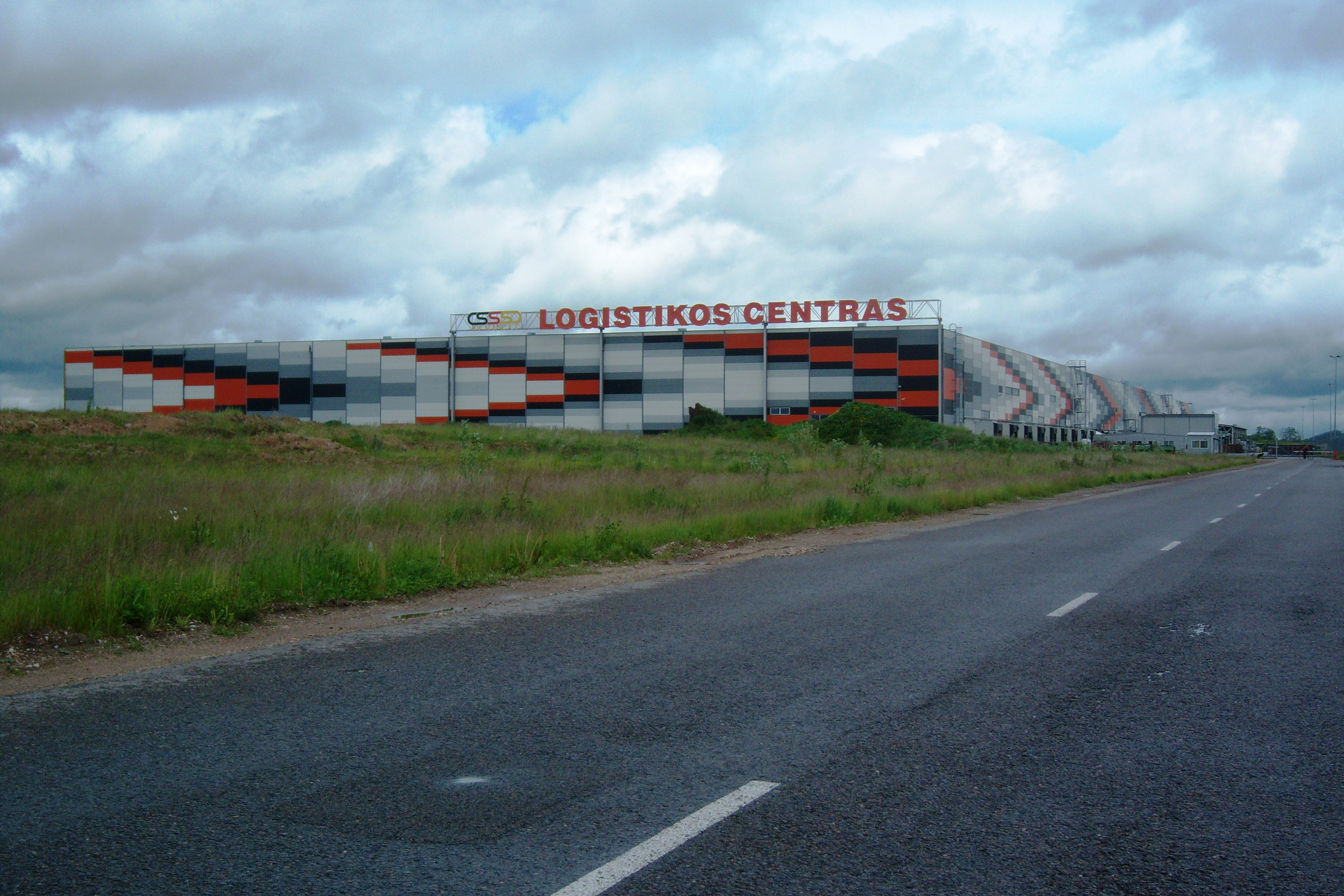
Kesko Senukai centre of logistics in Kaunas county (Lithuania)

Kesko Senukai has developed a logistics system with a storage area of about 100,000 square meters (1,100,000 sq ft).

Kesko Senukai logistics centre (JSC "Kesko Senukai Lithuania" Central Terminal), 60,000-square-meter (650,000 sq ft) logistics center, is located in Zemaitkiemis (district of Kaunas). It was built in 2008 and was controlled by JSC "Kesko Senukai Lithuania". In 2016, Kesko Senukai logistics centre was purchased by W.P. Carey Inc. Kesko Senukai has signed a 15-year lease contract with W.P. Carey Inc., and continues to use logistics service terminal.

== Development ==
JSC "Kesko Senukai Lithuania" cooperates with 1600 foreign and 600 Lithuanian suppliers. Four hundred foreign companies granted Kesko Senukai exclusive rights to distribute their products in Lithuania and Baltic countries region.

One of the biggest investment projects, currently implemented by CJSC "Baltic Shopping Centers", is development of shopping and leisure centre "Mega".

JSC "Kesko Senukai Lithuania" is one of the largest employers in Lithuania. In 2015, company took the 6th place in Lithuania according to number of people employed (3960).

== Marketing ==
Kesko Senukai increases sales and encourages purchases by various means such as customer loyalty programs, advertising publications and newsletters, sell-out campaigns.

=== Drive-in stores ===
Kesko Senukai offers for its "Statybu duona" customers a possibility to shop without leaving a car. Customers are able to drive into these stores, select and pay for goods without leaving their car (drive-in stores).

=== Credit card ===
In 2016, Kesko Senukai released their own credit card programme. Kesko Senukai credit card is connected with a customer loyalty programme and allows to buy in installments at Kesko Senukai stores.

== Charity ==
In 2001, "Senukai" Charity and Support Foundation was founded. Kesko Senukai sacrifices money for its employees families that are in trouble, people suffering from cancer, as well as for large families. Children's Houses and various community care organizations.

“Senukai" Charity and Support Foundation was of the biggest sponsor of the "Bedu turgus" supporting fund (2001–2015).

Kesko Senukai and its "Senukai" Charity and Support Foundation support the organizations of Caritas Lithuania, organization "Unicef Lithuania", the Community Care for Lithuanian people with intellectual disabilities "Viltis" (2008), Kaunas mentally retarded people care community "Kauno viltis", Kaunas County Public Library (2013), Justinas Marcinkevicius Public Library in Prienai city (Lithuania), Panevezys "Rozyno" community, Lithuanian students' competitions and events ("Ziemos improvizacijos"), Lithuanian Matesers campaigns ("And the little heart has big ideas") and their initiative "Maltieciu sriuba" (2012), book publishing ("Angelu kalba"), support and charity fund "Mamu unija" and charity fund "Alpha 1", Lithuanian Zoo, festival "Sielos 2011", Lithuania Dachshund lovers club, a clean environment campaign "Darom" and other projects and organizations."

Kesko Senukai has organized blood donation day in its administration office since 2015.
