= UAB ICOR =

ICOR (ex Rubicon group) is a Lithuanian group of more than 100 companies with 6,800 employees. The companies of the corporate group operate in more than 10 countries. Products and services of the companies are supplied to a market of over 60 countries.

Chairman of the Board of ICOR is Andrius Janukonis, Board Members are Gintautas Jaugielavičius and Linas Samuolis, CEO is Artūras Gudelis. Shareholders of the group are A. Janukonis, G. Jaugielavičius and L. Samuolis.

== History ==
The Rubicon group formed in 1990 as the freight forwarding consulting company Rubicon. The founders were former students of Vilnius University and the current Board members. They later became board members of the Rubicon Group of companies. Metal trading activities were expanded in Lithuania and then in Russia. In 2011, the group posted sales of 905 million litas (€262.1 million). In 2005 the company had a turnover of 311 million litas (approx. €90 million) and a profit of 24 million litas (€7 million).

In 2010, three group co-founders, shareholders, and board members (Rimantas Bukauskas, Arūnas Mačiuitis and Remigijus Lapinskas) sold their shares to the remaining four shareholders (Andrius Janukonis, Linas Samuolis, Gintautas Jaugielavičius, Darius Leščinskas) and bought 100% shares of Siemens Arena, the ticketing and ticket sales company Tiketa and the Panevėžio Arena, which managed the Cido Arena. Rubicon group became ICOR and then managed City Service, Ecoservice, Bionovus, the Realco group of companies and the Vichy Water Park. At the end of 2016, there were 6,999 employees. In 2017, a profit of 20.885 million euros was achieved.

Today the company successfully works in the public utilities, industry and energy, trade in petroleum products and real estate development fields. The turnover of the ICOR group in 2018 was €558 million. They also belonged to the largest basketball and concert venue in Vilnius Siemens Arena, Panevėžio Arena in Panavezhis and other objects.

== Structure ==
ICOR owns Axis Technologies (biofuel energy solutions); Veikmės statyba (construction); Realco (real estate projects); Oilead (international trade in petroleum products); Natural Fiber (factories for the processing of hemp stalks); Agrosfera (house of grain). ICOR owns the AXIOMA group of companies: Axioma Servisas (maintenance of equipment for industrial enterprises), Axioma Metering (production of ultrasonic heat and water meters) and Remeksi Keskus (services for the production of metal structures).
