= Vilniaus prekyba =

Lithuanian holding company

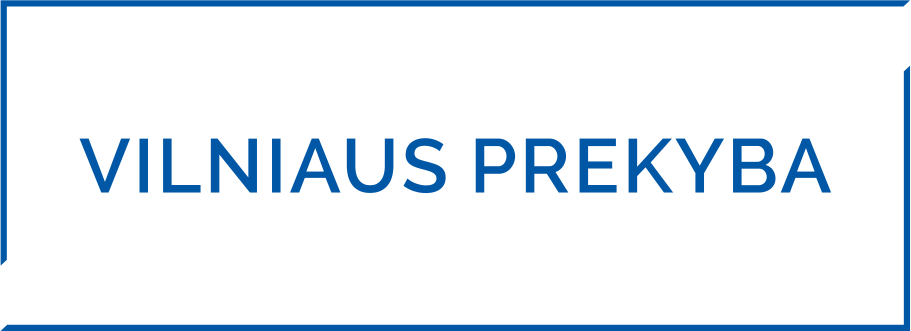

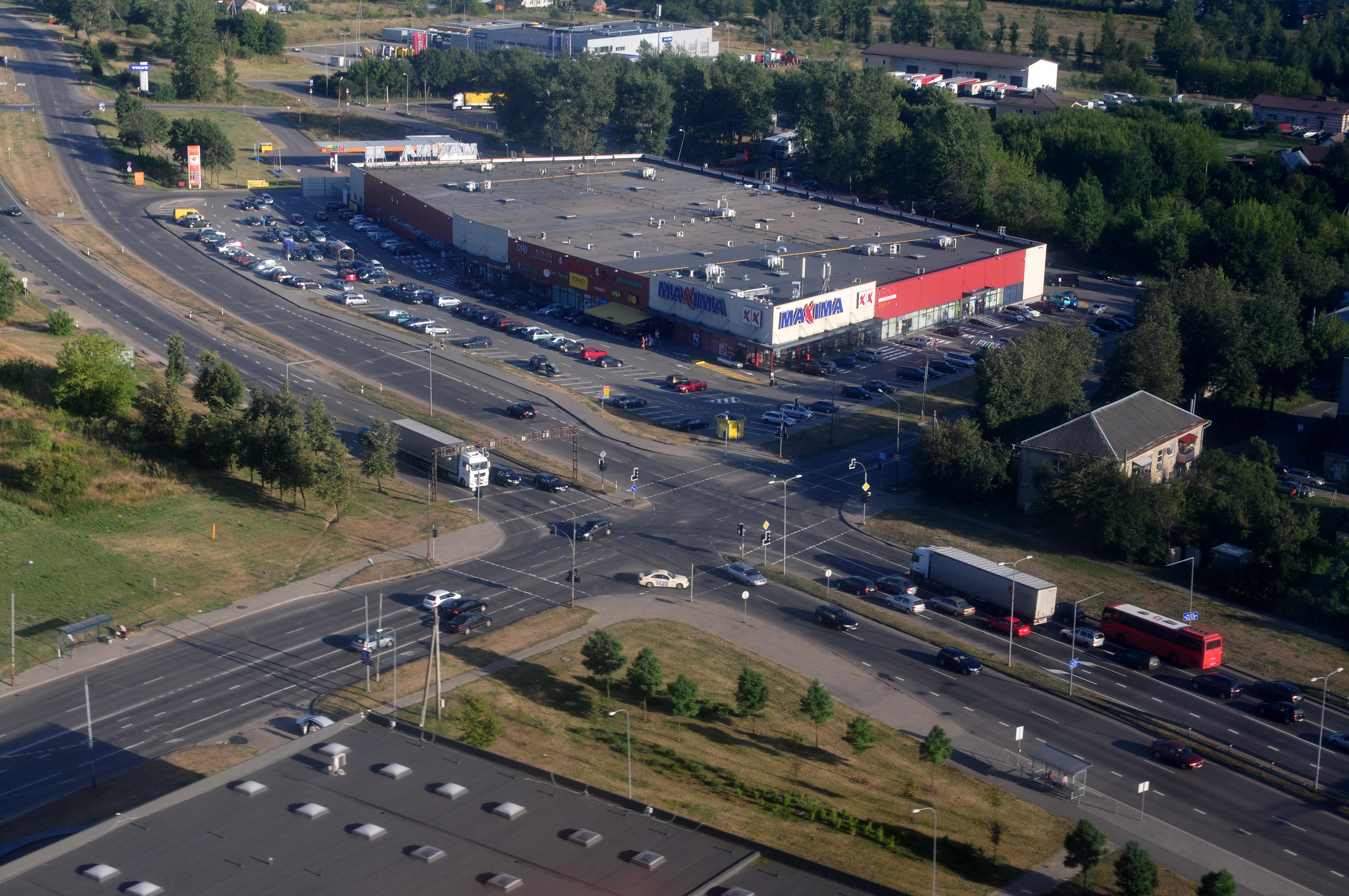
- Maxima store in Vilnius
- Trade name: VP
- Industry: Retail
- Founded: 1992
- Founder: Nerius Numa
- Headquarters: Vilnius, Lithuania
- Area served: Lithuania, Latvia, Estonia, Poland, Bulgaria, Sweden
- Key people: Paulius Mencas, CEO
- Revenue: ▲€8.5 billion (US$10.05 billion) (2025)
- Net income: ▲€190 million (US$224.71 million) (2025)
- Owner: Metodika group
- Number of employees: 43,882 (2025)
- Website: vilniausprekyba.lt

Vilniaus prekyba is the largest Lithuanian group of private companies operating since 1992, with 47,000 employees in six countries.

Vilniaus prekyba (VP Group) is the largest group of companies of the Metodika group. In 2025 the Metodika B.V. group of companies, which includes “Vilniaus prekyba”, was listed in Fortune’s ranking of the 500 largest companies in Europe.

Private Limited Liability Company Vilniaus Prekyba is an international, diversified investment management company that manages investments in retail and pharmacy chains, real estate development, and rental services in the Baltic states, Sweden, Poland, and Bulgaria through other subsidiaries. The company is also one of the two shareholders of the support fund Vilniaus prekybos paramos fondas "Dabar". Support Fund is engaged in public benefit support activities, the aim of which is to create long-term, sustainable change in the supported areas through its supported projects.

The main activity of the company is the management of investments in subsidiaries in order to reliably supervise the assets and ensure the long-term growth of their value. The company analyzes and controls the activities of the group companies, evaluates the strategic directions of the companies' activities, coordinates the activities of the companies, and represents the group companies.

== Major subsidiaries ==
- Maxima Grupė (formerly VP Market), which manages retail network operators in the Baltic States, Poland, and Bulgaria. Subsidiaries of Maxima Grupė, UAB: in Lithuania — Maxima LT, UAB and indirectly managed UAB "Barbora", in foreign countries — Stokrotka Sp. z o.o (Poland), Maxima Latvija SIA (Latvia), Maxima Eesti OÜ (Estonia), Maxima Bulgaria EOOD (Bulgaria). Maxima Grupė, UAB also owns a subsidiary Franmax, UAB, which provides IT services to retail chains managed by Maxima Grupė, UAB in Lithuania, Latvia, Estonia, and Bulgaria; and Maxima International Sourcing, UAB, which provides centralized supply, purchasing, and negotiation services to retail chains. Maxima (Baltics), Stokrotka (Poland), and T-Market (Bulgaria), develops private labels and engages in wholesale activities;
- Euroapotheca, UAB, an international group of companies in Northern Europe and Central and Eastern Europe, managing retail pharmacy chains and wholesale pharmaceutical companies in Lithuania — UAB Eurovaistinė, Sweden A poteksgruppen i Sverige AB, Latvia — Euroaptieka SIA, Estonia — Euroapteek OÜ and Poland — Euro-Apteka Sp z oo Euroapotheca also controls e-commerce trading company UAB Azeta, which operates in Lithuania, Latvia, Estonia and Poland through its subsidiaries;
- Akropolis Group, UAB — the leading shopping and entertainment centre development and management company in the Baltic countries. The company manages real estate project development, shopping and entertainment centers, and office buildings in Lithuania (Vilnius, Klaipeda, Siauliai — Akropolis) and Latvia (Riga — Akropole);
- Ermi Group, UAB, which operates store chains in Lithuania (Ermitažas, UAB) and Estonia (Bauhof Group AS) and engaged in e-commerce of construction and decor materials and household goods. In 2018, with the acquisition of Bauhof, the largest retail chain in Estonia, the group has become one of the largest DIY stores in the Baltics in terms of turnover;
- NDX NDX Group, which is an investment company operating in the commercial real estate sector in the Baltic region

== History ==
The beginning of the formation of the Vilnius prekyba Group was in 1992. The shareholders of the group companies were 9 Lithuanians, later named “VP devintukas”: brothers Nerijus Numa (group leader), Vladas Numavičius and Julius Numas, brothers Žilvinas, Mindaugas and Gintaras Marcinkevičius, Ignas Staškevičius, Renatas Vaitkevičius, Mindaugas Bagdonavičius.

The first founders of the group became acquainted while studying at the Faculty of Medicine at Vilnius University. Initially, the group was engaged in the sale of the real estate, actively involved in the privatization process by purchasing the privatization vouchers, later acquired an alcoholic beverage store (Urdžia). Eventually, the focus of the business was on food retail.

The first food retail stores of a unified standard were opened in 1994, and over time, the Maxima retail network has become the largest network in Lithuania and the Baltic States and also the best-known Lithuanian brand in the world. In parallel, the group developed other retail businesses. The first pharmacy network "Eurovaistinė" was opened in 1998, that was the first in Lithuania to offer self-service zones to customers. The DIY sector network Ermitažas opened in 2004. In 2016, Vilniaus Prekyba acquired Akropolis Group, a company that manages Akropolis shopping centers and other real estates. The first Akropolis opened its doors in Vilnius in 2002. In 2017, Maxima grupė bought online store Barbora. In 2018, UAB ERMI GROUP acquired Estonia's largest construction materials retail chain Bauhof, becoming one of the largest construction and home improvement stores in the Baltics by turnover.

In parallel with traditional retail trade, the Vilniaus Prekyba Group is developing e-commerce. Online gained new momentum and meaning in 2020, when, due to the global pandemic, many stores were closed or severely controlled, the increased demand for home delivery of food and other goods forced companies to make much faster progress than was planned over several years. The largest group online trading company Barbora expanded its range of services and greatly increased its home delivery capacity. The company was offering temporary job opportunities to people who were unable to do their normal jobs due to the pandemic. In 2021, Barbora and Azeta e-commerce stores launched in Poland. In Lithuania, the "Vilniaus prekyba" group was supplemented by a new company UAB "Trobos", which offered a new online marketplace in Lithuania, where you can buy goods from different stores with one purchase and receive them in one delivery at the exact time.

== Social responsibility ==
Vilniaus prekyba Group supports many non-governmental organizations and projects.

In 2019, Maxima Grupė, UAB, the largest company of Vilniaus Prekyba, became a member of the initiative of the United Nations Global Compact. In 2020, another step has been taken in this area — the Group has developed an internal corporate social responsibility reporting system and presented the first corporate social responsibility report.

== Shareholders ==
Shareholders of the company are three enterprises registered in the Republic of Lithuania:

- Metodika B.V.

Final beneficiaries of the company are as follows:

- Nerius Numa
- Ignas Staškevičius
