= Nerius Numa =

Lithuanian businessman (born 1967)

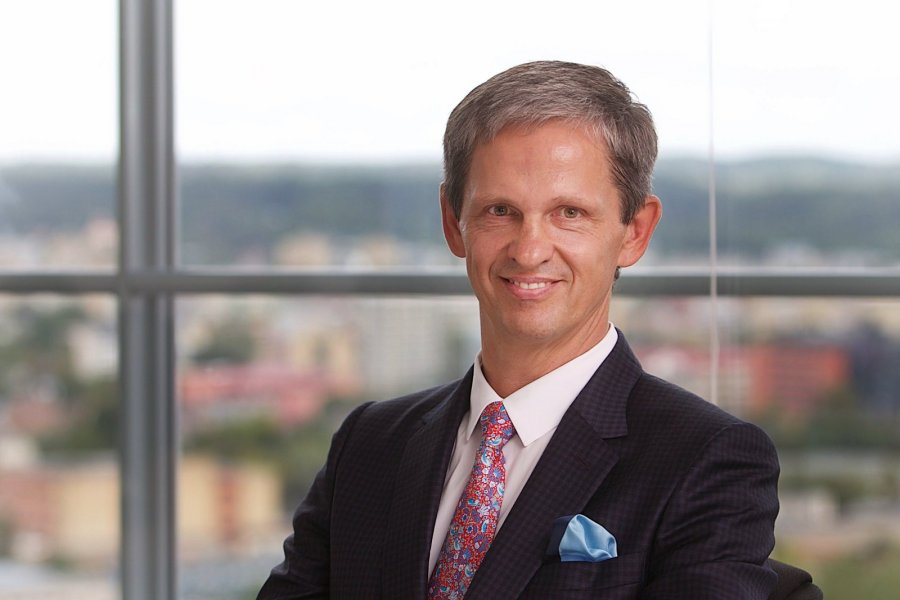
- Numa in 2016
- Born: 12 May 1967 (age 59); Šilalė, Lithuania
- Years active: 1990–present
- Spouses: Kaetana Numa (m. 2015) Lina Numavičienė (m. 1996; div. 2008)
- Children: 4

Nerius Numa (born Nerijus Numavičius; 12 May 1967) is a Lithuanian businessman. Nerijus Numa is a founder and ultimate beneficial owner (UBO) of private holding company Vilniaus prekyba and Metodika B.V..

Forbes magazine included Nerijus Numavičius in The World's Billionaires 2015 list and his net worth was valued above EUR 1 billion.

In 2016, Lithuania got its first university endowment fund and Nerijus Numavičius became a donor and a board member of Vilnius University Endowment in 2017.

== Early life ==
Numa was born on 12 May 1967, in Šilalė, the eldest of six children: three brothers and three sisters. Later the family moved to Šilagalys (near Panevėžys). He graduated from Panevėžio Žemynos progimnazija. In 2001, Numa earned a bachelor's degree in medical sciences from the Faculty of Medicine of Vilnius University, where he studied public health.

== Career ==
The first capital was gained by selling real estate in Lithuania. The received money was successfully invested in various company stocks. In 1992, together with friends and his two brothers, he established Urdzia, a small retail firm in Vilnius. In 1994, Vilniaus prekyba was established by 9 partners, merging 7 various and different size retail stores.

The extensive growth of the retail chain was funded by sale of various stocks that the group acquired during post-Soviet privatization campaigns. One of the transaction involved stock sale of four sugar refineries to Danisco (Danish sugar company). Other companies included Vilniaus paukštynas (poultry farm), Birštono mineraliniai vandenys (mineral water), Vilniaus mėsos kombinatas (meat packing), Vilniaus duona (bakery).

Four sugar refineries stock sale to Danisco was valued at USD 30 million and it created a good opportunities for retail business development. The first new type store of 3000 m^{2} was opened and Maxima Group brand was born in 1998.

According to a study carried out by the investment bank Prudentia and stock exchange Nasdaq Riga (Riga Stock Exchange), the value of Maxima Group was totaling 1.62 billion and increased by 26% in 2017 (YOY).

In 2025, the Metodika B.V. group of companies, was listed in Fortune’s ranking of the 500 largest companies in Europe.

== Awards ==
- Cross of Commander of the Order for Merits to Lithuania (2003)
- The Order of the White Star of Estonia (2004)
- Patron of the Vilnius City Municipality (2019)
