= Gediminas Žiemelis =

Lithuanian businessman

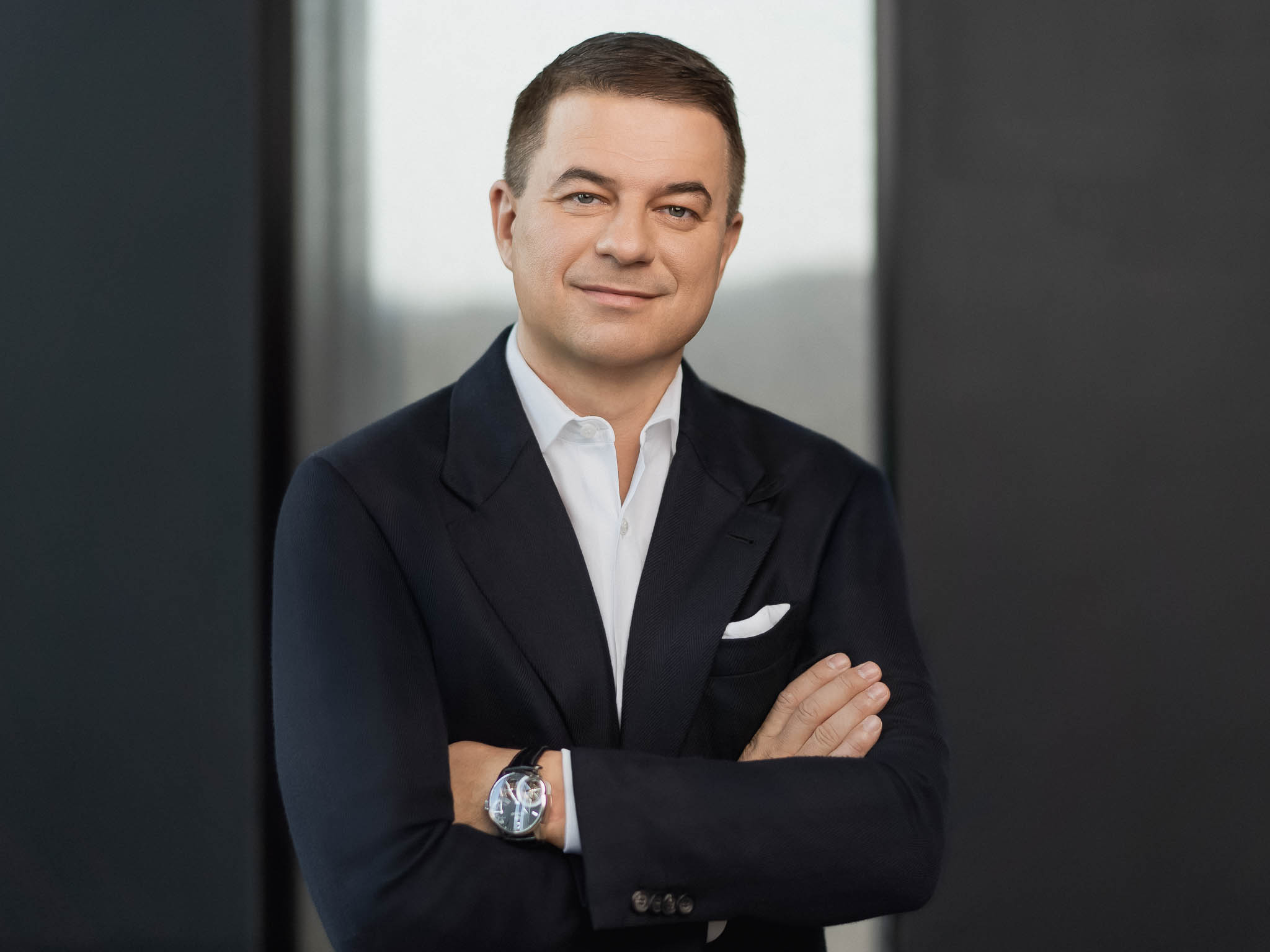
- Gediminas Žiemelis in 2026
- Born: April 4, 1977 (age 49); Vilnius, Lithuanian SSR
- Education: Mykolas Romeris University; Vilnius Gediminas Technical University
- Occupations: Businessman, business consultant
- Known for: Wealthiest person in Lithuania

Gediminas Žiemelis (born April 4, 1977) is a Lithuanian–Turkish businessman. He is currently the chairman of the board at Avia Solutions Group and former chairman of the board, founder and UBO at Vertas Management AB (former ZIA Valda). Since 2022 Gediminas Žiemelis has been listed as the richest Lithuanian. In 2024 his assets were estimated to be worth about 2.8 billion euros.

== Biography ==
Gediminas Žiemelis was born into poverty in Soviet-occupied Lithuania in 1977. In 1956, after Stalin died, the family returned from deportation in Siberia back to Lithuania while his mother was still a child. At the age of 19, in 1996, Žiemelis started his first company, a credit management and verification system, which he sold in 2004. Since then, he launched over 100 start-ups in different industries, managed four successful IPO/SPOs and raised over €1 billion in global capital and bond markets.

In 2023, Žiemelis ranked as one of Lithuania's most influential businessmen by Delfi.lt. He is regular columnist for AeroTime since 2019, where he writes about the aviation industry's trends. In 2016, he was recognized for his business skills with the European Business Award.

== Business ==
Most of Žiemelis' wealth is derived from his stake in the aviation industry. He has invested in multiple businesses across several different sectors and has taken five companies public. In 2010, as chairman of the board of aviation company Avia Solutions Group (ASG), he started the process of taking the company to an initial public offering (IPO). However, the IPO was postponed for one year due to what Žiemelis considered a low opening share price. In 2011, ASG became the first Lithuanian company to be listed on the Warsaw Stock Exchange. In 2013, also as chairman of the board of Avia AM Leasing (an aircraft leasing, acquisition and sales company), Žiemelis led the company to an IPO on the Warsaw Stock Exchange. In 2014, Žiemelis launched international duty-free operator Globus Distribution with partner ŽIA valda. In 2017 he established the pharmaceutical holding company Pharnasanta Group. As of 2024 he is no longer associated with the company.

== Awards ==
He was named twice as one of the most talented young leaders in the global aerospace industry under age 40 according to the Aviation Week. He was also acknowledged by the European Business Awards and received the national champion award in the entrepreneurship category for his approach to business development while leading Avia Solutions Group.

== Basketball ==
In 2022, Gediminas Žiemelis's "Basketball Holding Company" (BHC) bought the Vilnius-based Alytus "Dzūkija" basketball club, which was renamed the BC Wolves. In November 2023, Žiemelis founded, through BHC, the Dubai-based Sandstorm Shooters DMCC. In 2024, the BC Wolves re-branded to "Wolves Twinsbet" based in Vilnius. The BC Wolves competed in the Lithuanian Basketball League (LKL) and the European North Basketball League (ENBL) until June 2025, when the team suspended its operations for two seasons. The club played its home matches in Alytus Arena from 2022-2023, and then moved into the Avia Solutions Group Arena, later named the Twinsbet Arena, where it was based from 2023 until 2025.
